= 1990–91 UC Sampdoria season =

Sampdoria
1990–91 season
- Chairman: Paolo Mantovani
- Manager: Vujadin Boškov
- Stadium: Stadio Luigi Ferraris
- Serie A: 1st (in European Cup)
- European Cup Winners' Cup: Quarter-finals
- Coppa Italia: Runners-up
- European Super Cup: Runners-up
- Top goalscorer: League: Gianluca Vialli (19); All: Vialli (23)
Home colours	Away colours	Third colours

UC Sampdoria won their first ever Serie A title, thanks to a remarkable season for a team playing at its absolute peak. Gianluca Vialli was the league top scorer on 19 goals, and Roberto Mancini, Attilio Lombardo, goalkeeper Gianluca Pagliuca plus centre half Pietro Vierchowod were also instrumental in Sampdoria's success story.

== Squad ==
Note: Flags indicate national team as defined under FIFA eligibility rules; some limited exceptions apply. Players may hold more than one non-FIFA nationality.

Pos.	Nation	Player
GK	ITA	Gianluca Pagliuca
GK	ITA	Giulio Nuciari
DF	ITA	Moreno Mannini
DF	ITA	Pietro Vierchowod
DF	ITA	Luca Pellegrini
DF	ITA	Marco Lanna
DF	ITA	Giovanni Dall'Igna
MF	ITA	Ivano Bonetti
MF	ITA	Giuseppe Dossena

Pos.	Nation	Player
MF	BRA	Toninho Cerezo
MF	ITA	Attilio Lombardo
MF	ITA	Fausto Pari
MF	YUG	Srečko Katanec
MF	ITA	Giovanni Invernizzi
MF	URS	Alexei Mikhailichenko
FW	ITA	Gianluca Vialli
FW	ITA	Roberto Mancini
FW	ITA	Marco Branca
FW	ITA	Umberto Calcagno

=== Transfers ===
In
Pos.	Name	from	Type
MF	Alexei Mikhailichenko	Dynamo Kyiv	
MF	Ivano Bonetti	Bologna F.C.	
FW	Marco Branca	Udinese Calcio	
FW	Umberto Calcagno		
FW	Michele Mignani		

Out
Pos.	Name	To	Type
DF	Amedeo Carboni	A.S. Roma	
MF	Víctor Muñoz	Real Zaragoza	
MF	Roberto Breda	Salernitana	
MF	Fausto Salsano	A.S. Roma	

== Competitions ==
=== Serie A ===
==== League table ====
Pos	Team	Pld	W	D	L	GF	GA	GD	Pts	Qualification or relegation
1	Sampdoria (C)	34	20	11	3	57	24	+33	51	Qualification to European Cup
2	Milan (Note: In March 1991, UEFA banned Milan from participating in European competition for one season due to refusing to resume their 1990-91 European Cup quarterfinal match away versus Olympique Marseille. The ban went into effect for the 1991–92 UEFA Cup.)	34	18	10	6	46	19	+27	46	Banned from European competition
3	Internazionale	34	18	10	6	56	31	+25	46	Qualification to UEFA Cup
4	Genoa	34	14	12	8	51	36	+15	40	Qualification to UEFA Cup
5	Torino	34	12	14	8	40	29	+11	38	Qualification to UEFA Cup

Source: 1990–91 Serie A, RSSSF.com
Rules for classification: 1) Points; 2) Head-to-head points; 3) Head-to-head goal difference; 4) Goal difference; 5) Goals scored; 6) Draw.
(C) Champions

==== Results summary ====
Overall								Home						Away					
Pld	W	D	L	GF	GA	GD	Pts	W	D	L	GF	GA	GD	W	D	L	GF	GA	GD
34	20	11	3	57	24	+33	71	13	2	2	36	16	+20	7	9	1	21	8	+13

Source: Worldfootball

==== Results by round ====
Round	1	2	3	4	5	6	7	8	9	10	11	12	13	14	15	16	17	18	19	20	21	22	23	24	25	26	27	28	29	30	31	32	33	34	35
Ground	H	A	H	A	A	H	A	H	A	H	A	H	A	H	H	A	H	H	A	H	A	H	H	A	H	A	H	A	H	A	H	A	A	H	A
Result	W	D	W	D	D	W	W	W	W	L	D	-	D	W	L	L	D	W	W	W	W	W	W	D	W	W	W	D	D	W	W	W	D	W	D
Position	7	6	4	3	4	3	1	1	1	1	1	3	3	1	3	5	5	4	3	2	2	1	1	2	2	1	1	1	1	1	1	1	1	1	1

Source: Competitive matches
A = Away; H = Home; W = Win; D = Draw; L = Loss; = 1991–92 European Cup; = 1991–92 UEFA Cup

==== Matches ====
9 September 1990 1	Sampdoria	1–0	Cesena	Genoa
	Invernizzi 49'	Report		Stadium: Luigi Ferraris; Attendance: 22,000; Referee: Carlo Sguizzato

16 September 1990 2	Fiorentina	0–0	Sampdoria	Florence
		Report		Stadium: Artemio Franchi; Attendance: 32,836; Referee: Carlo Longhi

23 September 1990 3	Sampdoria	2–1	Bologna	Genoa
	Lombardo 49'; Mikhailichenko 86'	Report	Détári 89'	Stadium: Luigi Ferraris; Attendance: 30,000; Referee: Sergio Coppetelli

30 September 1990 4	Juventus	0–0	Sampdoria	Turin
		Report		Stadium: delle Alpi; Attendance: 47,116; Referee: Gianni Beschin

7 October 1990 5	Parma	0–0	Sampdoria	Parma
		Report		Stadium: Il Tardini; Attendance: 16,840; Referee: Loris Stafoggia

14 October 1990 6	Sampdoria	4–1	Atalanta	Genoa
	De Patre 26' (o.g.); Branca 45', 71'; Mancini 85' (pen.)	Report	Evair 43'	Stadium: Luigi Ferraris; Attendance: 27,000; Referee: Pierluigi Pairetto

21 October 1990 7	Milan	0–1	Sampdoria	Milan
		Report	Toninho Cerezo 68'	Stadium: San Siro; Attendance: 79,897; Referee: Angelo Amendolia

11 November 1990 8	Sampdoria	4–2	Pisa	Genoa
	Mikhailichenko 8'; Mancini 46'; Vialli 57'; Branca 74'	Report	Piovanelli 84', 89'	Stadium: Luigi Ferraris; Attendance: 28,000; Referee: Rosario Lo Bello

18 November 1990 9	Napoli	1–4	Sampdoria	Naples
	Incocciati 40'	Report	Vialli 41', 60'; Mancini 45', 90'	Stadium: San Paolo; Attendance: 57,013; Referee: Pierluigi Magni

25 November 1990 10	Sampdoria	1–2	Genoa	Genoa
	Vialli 49' (pen.)	Report	Eranio 27'; Branco 74'	Stadium: Luigi Ferraris; Attendance: 49,058; Referee: Carlo Longhi

2 December 1990 11	Cagliari	0–0	Sampdoria	Cagliari
		Report		Stadium: Sant'Elia; Attendance: 25,000; Referee: Sergio Coppetelli

9 December 1990 12	Sampdoria	suspd.	Roma	Genoa
		Report		Stadium: Luigi Ferraris; Referee: Arcangelo Pezzella
Note: Match suspended due to heavy rain.

16 December 1990 13	Bari	1–1	Sampdoria	Bari
	Răducioiu 28'	Report	Lombardo 8'	Stadium: San Nicola; Attendance: 36,462; Referee: Rosario Lo Bello

30 December 1990 14	Sampdoria	3–1	Internazionale	Genoa
	Vialli 1', 82' (pen.); Mancini 86'	Report	Berti 50'	Stadium: Luigi Ferraris; Attendance: 42,509; Referee: Loris Stafoggia

6 January 1991 15	Sampdoria	1–2	Torino	Genoa
	Vialli 89' (pen.)	Report	Bresciani 21' (pen.), 87'	Stadium: Luigi Ferraris; Attendance: 31,210; Referee: Piero Ceccarini

13 January 1991 16	Lecce	1–0	Sampdoria	Lecce
	Pasculli 66'	Report		Stadium: Via del Mare; Attendance: 16,063; Referee: Pietro D'Elia

20 January 1991 17	Sampdoria	1–1	Lazio	Genoa
	Vialli 51'	Report	Sosa 85'	Stadium: Luigi Ferraris; Attendance: 25,191; Referee: Gianni Beschin

23 January 1991 12	Sampdoria	2–1	Roma	Genoa
	Tempestilli 12' (o.g.); Vialli 55'	Report	Tempestilli 13'	Stadium: Luigi Ferraris; Attendance: 25,000; Referee: Arcangelo Pezzella

27 January 1991 18	Cesena	0–1	Sampdoria	Cesena
		Report	Branca 45'	Stadium: Dino Manuzzi; Attendance: 12.194; Referee: Pierluigi Pairetto

3 February 1991 19	Sampdoria	1–0	Fiorentina	Genoa
	Branca 87'	Report		Stadium: Luigi Ferraris; Attendance: 27,708; Referee: Werther Cornieti

10 February 1991 20	Bologna	0–3	Sampdoria	Bologna
		Report	Katanec 47'; Vialli 77'; Mikhailichenko 85'	Stadium: Renato Dall'Ara; Attendance: 19,000; Referee: Tullio Lanese

17 February 1991 21	Sampdoria	1–0	Juventus	Genoa
	Vialli 50' (pen.)	Report		Stadium: Luigi Ferraris; Attendance: 39,184; Referee: Angelo Amendolia

24 February 1991 22	Sampdoria	1–0	Parma	Genoa
	Mancini 90'	Report		Stadium: Luigi Ferraris; Attendance: 31,714; Referee: Pierluigi Magni

3 March 1991 23	Atalanta	1–1	Sampdoria	Bergamo
	Caniggia 78'	Report	Katanec 16'	Stadium: Comunale; Attendance: 19,030; Referee: Fabio Baldas

10 March 1991 24	Sampdoria	2–0	Milan	Genoa
	Vialli 52' (pen.); Mancini 70'	Report		Stadium: Luigi Ferraris; Attendance: 38,400; Referee: Pietro D'Elia

17 March 1991 25	Pisa	0–3	Sampdoria	Pisa
		Report	Mannini 65'; Vialli 77'; Mancini 79'	Stadium: Comunale; Attendance: 15,276; Referee: Gianni Beschin

24 March 1991 26	Sampdoria	4–1	Napoli	Genoa
	Toninho Cerezo 12'; Vialli 19', 64'; Lombardo 85'	Report	Maradona 74' (pen.)	Stadium: Luigi Ferraris; Attendance: 30,000; Referee: Alfredo Trentalange

30 March 1991 27	Genoa	0–0	Sampdoria	Genoa
		Report		Stadium: Luigi Ferraris; Attendance: 40,161; Referee: Tullio Lanese

7 April 1991 28	Sampdoria	2–2	Cagliari	Genoa
	Vialli 28'; Mancini 44'	Report	Fonseca 72', 88'	Stadium: Luigi Ferraris; Attendance: 32,274; Referee: Marcello Nicchi

14 April 1991 29	Roma	0–1	Sampdoria	Rome
		Report	Vierchowod 50'	Stadium: Olimpico; Attendance: 70 198; Referee: Angelo Amendolia

21 April 1991 30	Sampdoria	3–2	Bari	Genoa
	Vierchowod 41'; Mancini 45'; Vialli 75' (pen.)	Report	Loseto 63'; Cucchi 80'	Stadium: Luigi Ferraris; Attendance: 29,778; Referee: Luciano Luci

5 May 1991 31	Internazionale	0–2	Sampdoria	Milan
	Bergomi (red card) 45'; Matthäus (penalty missed) 65'	Report	Dossena 60'; Vialli 76'; Mancini (red card) 45'	Stadium: Giuseppe Meazza; Attendance: 78,912; Referee: Pietro D'Elia

12 May 1991 32	Torino	1–1	Sampdoria	Turin
	Bresciani 78' (pen.)	Report	Invernizzi 32'	Stadium: delle Alpi; Attendance: 41,224; Referee: Pietro D'Elia

19 May 1991 33	Sampdoria	3–0	Lecce	Genoa
	Toninho Cerezo 2'; Mannini 13'; Vialli 30'	Report		Stadium: Luigi Ferraris; Attendance: 48,487; Referee: Tullio Lanese

26 May 1991 34	Lazio	3–3	Sampdoria	Rome
	Marchegiani 1', 75'; Riedle 9'	Report	Vierchowod 22'; Mancini 38' (pen.), 49'	Stadium: Olimpico; Attendance: 34,426; Referee: Massimo Chiesa

=== Coppa Italia ===
==== Second round ====
5 September 1990 1	Sampdoria	1–1	Brescia	Genoa
	Dossena 48'		Ganz 45'	Stadium: Stadio Luigi Ferraris; Referee: Piero Ceccarini

12 September 1990 2	Brescia	0–4 (0–5 agg.)	Sampdoria	Brescia
			Dossena 21'; Mancini 63'; Invernizzi 75'; Lombardo 79'	Stadium: Stadio Mario Rigamonti; Referee: Marcello Nicchi

==== Round of 16 ====
14 November 1990 1	Sampdoria	1–1	Cremonese	Genoa
	Mancini 71'		Dezotti 2'	Stadium: Stadio Luigi Ferraris; Referee: Vincenzo Fucci

21 November 1990 2	Cremonese	2–3 (3–4 agg.)	Sampdoria	Cremona
	Pari 32' (o.g.); Garzilli 78'		Vialli 48' (pen.), 80' (pen.); Invernizzi 86'	Stadium: Stadio Giovanni Zini; Referee: Luciano Luci

==== Quarter-finals ====
6 February 1991 1	Torino	1–0	Sampdoria	Turin
	Lentini 1'			Stadium: Stadio delle Alpi; Attendance: 13,621; Referee: Sergio Coppetelli

20 February 1991 2	Sampdoria	1–0 (a.e.t.) (1–1 agg.) (3–2 p)	Torino	Genoa
	Bonetti 40'			Stadium: Stadio Luigi Ferraris; Attendance: 15,000; Referee: Rosario Lo Bello
	Penalties
	Vialli (penalty missed); Vierchowod (penalty missed); Cerezo (penalty scored); Mikhailichenko (penalty missed); Mancini (penalty scored); Lombardo (penalty scored)		(penalty missed) Cravero; (penalty scored) Policano; (penalty scored) Mussi; (penalty missed) Baggio; (penalty missed) Bresciani; (penalty missed) Lentini

==== Semi-finals ====
12 March 1991 1	Napoli	1–0	Sampdoria	Naples
	Maradona 22'			Stadium: Stadio San Paolo; Attendance: 35,000; Referee: Carlo Sguizzato

3 April 1991 2	Sampdoria	2–0 (2–1 agg.)	Napoli	Genoa
	Vialli 27' (pen.); Invernizzi 88'			Stadium: Stadio Luigi Ferraris; Attendance: 17,237; Referee: Pierluigi Magni

==== Final ====
30 May 1991 1	Roma	3–1	Sampdoria	Rome
20:30 CEST (UTC+01:00)	Pellegrini 12' (o.g.); Berthold 35'; Völler 40'		Katanec 29'	Stadium: Stadio Olimpico; Attendance: 55,063; Referee: Pierluigi Pairetto

9 June 1991 2	Sampdoria	1–1 (2–4 agg.)	Roma	Genoa
18:30 CEST (UTC+01:00)	Aldair 79' (o.g.)		Völler 56' (pen.)	Stadium: Stadio Luigi Ferraris; Attendance: 40,000; Referee: Arcangelo Pezzella

=== European Cup Winners' Cup ===
==== First round ====
19 September 1990 1	Kaiserslautern (West Germany)	1–0	(Italy) Sampdoria	Kaiserslautern, West Germany
	Kuntz 75'			Stadium: Fritz-Walter-Stadion; Attendance: 32,674; Referee: John Blankenstein (Netherlands)

7 October 1990 2	Sampdoria (Italy)	2–0 (2–1 agg.)	(West Germany) Kaiserslautern	Genoa, Italy
	Mancini 6' (pen.); Branca 75'			Stadium: Stadio Luigi Ferraris; Attendance: 29,994; Referee: Neil Midgley (England)

==== Second round ====
24 October 1990 1	Olympiacos (Greece)	0–1	(Italy) Sampdoria	Piraeus, Greece
			Katanec 53'	Stadium: Karaiskakis Stadium; Attendance: 14,289; Referee: George Courtney (England)

7 November 1990 2	Sampdoria (Italy)	3–1 (4–1 agg.)	(Greece) Olympiacos	Genoa, Italy
	Branca 17', 66'; Lombardo 29'		Drakopoulos 62'	Stadium: Stadio Luigi Ferraris; Attendance: 23,745; Referee: Emilio Soriano Aladrén (Spain)

==== Quarter-finals ====
6 March 1991 1	Legia Warsaw (Poland)	1–0	(Italy) Sampdoria	Warsaw, Poland
	Czykier 44'			Stadium: Polish Army Stadium; Attendance: 7.028; Referee: Serge Muhmenthaler (Switzerland)

20 March 1991 2	Sampdoria (Italy)	2–2 (2–3 agg.)	(Poland) Legia Warsaw	Genoa, Italy
	Mancini 67'; Vialli 88'		Kowalczyk 19', 54'	Stadium: Stadio Luigi Ferraris; Attendance: 25,860; Referee: Wieland Ziller (Germany)

=== European Super Cup ===
10 October 1990 1	Sampdoria (Italy)	1–1	(Italy) Milan	Genoa
20:30 CET (UTC+01:00)	Mikhailichenko 31'; Invernizzi (yellow card); Mancini (yellow card)		Evani 39'; Massaro (yellow card)	Stadium: Stadio Luigi Ferraris; Attendance: 19,724; Referee: José Rosa dos Santos (Portugal)

29 November 1990 2	Milan (Italy)	2–0 (3–1 agg.)	(Italy) Sampdoria	Bologna
20:30 CET (UTC+01:00)	Gullit 44'; Rijkaard 76'			Stadium: Stadio Renato Dall'Ara; Attendance: 20,924; Referee: Zoran Petrović (Yugoslavia)

== Statistics ==
=== Players statistics ===
No.	Pos	Nat	Player	Total		Serie A		Coppa		ECWC	
No.	Pos	Nat	Player	Apps	Goals	Apps	Goals	Apps	Goals	Apps	Goals
	GK	(Italy) ITA	Pagliuca	49	-37	33	-22	10	-10	6	-5
	DF	(Italy) ITA	Mannini	38	2	26	2	7	0	5	0
	DF	(Italy) ITA	Lanna	39	0	20+6	0	8	0	5	0
	DF	(Italy) ITA	Vierchowod	44	3	30	3	10	0	4	0
	DF	(Socialist Federal Republic of Yugoslavia) YUG	Katanec	37	4	26	2	6	1	5	1
	MF	(Italy) ITA	Lombardo	46	5	32	3	8	1	6	1
	MF	(Italy) ITA	Pari	49	0	32+1	0	10	0	6	0
	MF	(Italy) ITA	Invernizzi	44	5	17+14	2	9	3	4	0
	MF	(Italy) ITA	Dossena	47	3	34	1	7	2	6	0
	FW	(Italy) ITA	Mancini	45	16	29+1	12	10	2	5	2
	FW	(Italy) ITA	Vialli	36	23	26	19	7	3	3	1
	GK	(Italy) ITA	Nuciari	2	-2	2	-2	0	0	0	0
	MF	(Soviet Union) URS	Mikhailichenko	37	3	18+6	3	8	0	5	0
	MF	(Italy) ITA	Bonetti	36	1	15+10	0	9	1	2	0
	DF	(Italy) ITA	Pellegrini	19	0	15	0	2	0	2	0
	MF	(Brazil) BRA	Toninho Cerezo	21	3	11+1	3	4	0	5	0
	FW	(Italy) ITA	Branca	32	8	8+12	5	7	0	5	3
	FW	(Italy) ITA	Calcagno	6	0	1+1	0	4	0	0	0
	DF	(Italy) ITA	Dall'Igna	1	0	0	0	1	0	0	0
	DF	(Italy) ITA	Mignani	1	0	0+1	0	0	0	0	0

- Source: http://calcio-seriea.net/dettagli_giocatore/1990/2758/

== Sources ==
- RSSSF - Italy 1990/91
