= 1993–94 UC Sampdoria season =

Sampdoria
1993–94 season
- President: Enrico Mantovani
- Manager: Sven-Göran Eriksson
- Stadium: Stadio Luigi Ferraris
- Serie A: 3rd
- Coppa Italia: Winners (in UEFA Cup Winners' Cup)
- Top goalscorer: League: Ruud Gullit (15); All: Ruud Gullit (17)
- Highest home attendance: 39,735 vs Juventus (23 January 1994)
- Lowest home attendance: 25 122 vs Atalanta B.C. (20 February 1994)
- Average home league attendance: 30 158 (League)
Home colours	Away colours	Third colours

Unione Calcio Sampdoria bounced back from a disappointing season the year before, and scored the most goals of all teams on its way to third in Serie A. It also won Coppa Italia following a furious second-half offensive against Ancona, winning both the match and on aggregate with a commanding 6–1.

The influential players were Ruud Gullit and Roberto Mancini, combined with playmakers David Platt and Attilio Lombardo, with Sampdoria's strength lying in offense. The entire team was composed of internationally recognised players, though the defence lacked the efficiency of league champions A.C. Milan.

== Players ==
Note: Flags indicate national team as defined under FIFA eligibility rules; some limited exceptions apply. Players may hold more than one non-FIFA nationality.

Pos.	Nation	Player
GK	ITA	Gianluca Pagliuca
GK	ITA	Giulio Nuciari
GK	ITA	Matteo Sereni
DF	ITA	Giovanni Dall'Igna
DF	ITA	Moreno Mannini
DF	ITA	Marco Rossi
DF	ITA	Stefano Sacchetti
DF	ITA	Michele Serena
DF	ITA	Pietro Vierchowod
MF	SVN	Srečko Katanec
MF	ITA	Giovanni Invernizzi

Pos.	Nation	Player
MF	YUG	Vladimir Jugović
MF	ITA	Alberigo Evani
MF	ENG	David Platt
MF	ITA	Attilio Lombardo
MF	ITA	Fausto Salsano
FW	NED	Ruud Gullit
FW	ITA	Nicola Amoruso
FW	ITA	Claudio Bellucci
FW	ITA	Mauro Bertarelli
FW	ITA	Roberto Mancini

=== Transfers ===
In
Pos.	Name	from	Type
FW	Ruud Gullit	A.C. Milan	loan
MF	Alberigo Evani	A.C. Milan	-
MF	David Platt	Juventus	-
DF	Marco Rossi	Brescia Calcio	-
MF	Fausto Salsano	A.S. Roma	-
DF	Giovanni Dall'Igna	SPAL	-
FW	Nicola Amoruso		-

Out
Pos.	Name	To	Type
DF	Des Walker	Sheffield Wednesday	-
DF	Marco Lanna	A.S. Roma	-
MF	Ivano Bonetti	Bologna F.C.	-
MF	Nicola Zanini	A.C. Mantova	-
FW	Renato Buso	S.S.C. Napoli	-
MF	Eugenio Corini	S.S.C. Napoli	loan
FW	Enrico Chiesa	Modena F.C.	loan

== Competitions ==
=== Serie A ===
==== League table ====
Pos	Team	Pld	W	D	L	GF	GA	GD	Pts	Qualification or relegation
2	Juventus	34	17	13	4	58	25	+33	47	Qualification to UEFA Cup
3	Lazio	34	17	10	7	55	40	+15	44	Qualification to UEFA Cup
4	Sampdoria	34	18	8	8	64	39	+25	44	Qualification to Cup Winners' Cup
5	Parma	34	17	7	10	50	35	+15	41	Qualification to UEFA Cup
6	Napoli	34	12	12	10	41	35	+6	36	Qualification to UEFA Cup

Source: 1993–94 Serie A, RSSSF.com, Soccerway
Rules for classification: 1) Points; 2) Head-to-head points; 3) Head-to-head goal difference; 4) Goal difference; 5) Goals scored; 6) Draw. (Note: Head-to-head record is used only after all the matches between the teams in question have been played).

==== Results summary ====
Overall								Home						Away					
Pld	W	D	L	GF	GA	GD	Pts	W	D	L	GF	GA	GD	W	D	L	GF	GA	GD
34	18	8	8	64	39	+25	62	11	3	3	41	20	+21	7	5	5	23	19	+4

Source: Worldfootball

==== Results by round ====
Round	1	2	3	4	5	6	7	8	9	10	11	12	13	14	15	16	17	18	19	20	21	22	23	24	25	26	27	28	29	30	31	32	33	34
Ground	A	H	A	H	A	H	A	H	A	H	H	A	H	A	A	H	A	H	A	H	A	H	A	H	A	H	A	A	H	A	H	H	A	H
Result	W	W	L	W	W	D	W	L	W	W	L	W	W	D	L	W	D	W	L	D	W	W	L	W	W	W	L	D	W	D	D	W	D	L
Position	1	1	4	3	2	2	2	4	3	1	3	3	1	2	3	2	2	2	2	2	2	2	4	2	2	2	2	2	2	3	3	3	3	3

Source: Competitive matches
A = Away; H = Home; W = Win; D = Draw; L = Loss; = 1994–95 UEFA Champions League; = 1994–95 UEFA Cup; = Relegation to 1994–95 Serie B; c = 1994–95 UEFA Cup Winners' Cup

==== Matches ====
29 August 1993 1	Napoli	1–2	Sampdoria	Naples
	Bresciani 81'	Report	Platt 31'; Gullit 43'	Stadium: Stadio San Paolo; Referee: Pierluigi Pairetto

5 September 1993 2	Sampdoria	2–1	Piacenza	Genoa
	Jugovic 35'; R. Mancini 45' (pen.)	Report	Bucchioni 43' (o.g.)	Stadium: Stadio Luigi Ferraris; Referee: Roberto Bettin

8 September 1993 3	Juventus	3–1	Sampdoria	Turin
	Conte 28'; R. Baggio 47'; Möller 64'	Report	Gullit 27'	Stadium: Stadio Delle Alpi; Referee: Fabio Baldas

12 September 1993 4	Sampdoria	2–1	Lecce	Genoa
	Jugovic 42'; Platt 79'	Report	Gérson Caçapa 44'	Stadium: Stadio Luigi Ferraris; Referee: Libero Brignoccoli

19 September 1993 5	Udinese	0–2	Sampdoria	Udine
	Branca (yellow card) 34'; Desideri (yellow card) 85'	Report	Mannini (yellow card) 28'; Platt 54', (yellow card) 72'; Lombardo (yellow card) 60'; R. Mancini 74'; Jugović (yellow card) 74'	Stadium: Stadio Friuli; Attendance: 18,560; Referee: Luciano Luci

26 September 1993 6	Sampdoria	1–1	Parma	Genoa
	Lombardo 3'	Report	Sacchetti 29' (o.g.)	Stadium: Stadio Luigi Ferraris; Referee: Alfredo Trentalange

3 October 1993 7	Atalanta	1–4	Sampdoria	Bergamo
	Sauzée 65' (pen.)	Report	Gullit 19', 58'; R. Mancini 34'; Platt 64'	Stadium: Stadio Atleti Azzurri d'Italia; Referee: Piero Ceccarini

17 October 1993 8	Sampdoria	0–1	Roma	Genoa
		Report	Balbo 44'	Stadium: Stadio Luigi Ferraris; Referee: Pierluigi Collina

24 October 1993 9	Torino	2–3	Sampdoria	Turin
	Silenzi 40'; Poggi 90'	Report	Sacchetti 47'; Gullit 53'; Cois 64' (o.g.)	Stadium: Stadio Delle Alpi; Referee: Livio Bazzoli

31 October 1993 10	Sampdoria	3–2	Milan	Genoa
14:30 CEST (UTC+01:00)	Katanec 56'; R. Mancini 71' (pen.); Gullit 78'	Report	Albertini 11'; Laudrup 25'	Stadium: Stadio Luigi Ferraris; Attendance: 38,954; Referee: Marcello Nicchi

7 November 1993 11	Sampdoria	1–2	Cagliari	Genoa
	Bertarelli 3'; Vierchowod (red card) 70'; R. Mancini (penalty missed) 76'	Report	Allegri 68'; Matteoli 70' (pen.)	Stadium: Stadio Luigi Ferraris; Referee: Angelo Amendolia

21 November 1993 12	Foggia	1–2	Sampdoria	Foggia
	Roy 12'; Stroppa (penalty missed) 52'	Report	Gullit 24'; R. Mancini (penalty missed) 32'; Lombardo 77'	Stadium: Stadio Pino Zaccheria; Referee: Virginio Quartuccio

28 November 1993 13	Sampdoria	3–1	Cremonese	Genoa
	Platt 36'; Gullit 67', 89' (pen.)	Report	Dezotti 45'	Stadium: Stadio Luigi Ferraris; Referee: Giuseppe Rosica

5 December 1993 14	Genoa	1–1	Sampdoria	Genoa
	Routolo 1'	Report	Platt 43'; R. Mancini (red card) 63'	Stadium: Stadio Luigi Ferraris; Referee: Gianni Beschin

12 December 1993 15	Internazionale	3–0	Sampdoria	Milan
	Battistini 4'; Jugović 29' (o.g.); Bergkamp 56' (pen.)	Report		Stadium: San Siro; Referee: Alfredo Trentalange

19 December 1993 16	Sampdoria	1–0	Reggiana	Genoa
	Lombardo 55'	Report		Stadium: Stadio Luigi Ferraris; Referee: Livio Bazzoli

2 January 1994 17	Lazio	1–1	Sampdoria	Rome
	Signori 37' (pen.)	Report	Gullit 6'	Stadium: Stadio Olimpico; Attendance: 55,058; Referee: Marcello Nicchi

9 January 1994 18	Sampdoria	4–1	Napoli	Genoa
	Platt (penalty missed) 19'; Lombardo 34'; Gullit 52'; R. Mancini 85', 90'	Report	Fonseca (penalty missed) 43', 51'	Stadium: Stadio Luigi Ferraris; Referee: Fabio Baldas

16 January 1994 19	Piacenza	2–1	Sampdoria	Piacenza
	Piovani 31'; Ferrante 67'	Report	Lombardo 84' (pen.)	Stadium: Stadio Galleana; Referee: Roberto Bettin

23 January 1994 20	Sampdoria	1–1	Juventus	Genoa
	Lombardo 28' (pen.)	Report	Ravanelli 81'	Stadium: Stadio Luigi Ferraris; Attendance: 39,735; Referee: Piero Ceccarini

30 January 1994 21	Lecce	0–3	Sampdoria	Lecce
		Report	R. Mancini (penalty missed) 15', 90'; Vierchowod 53'; Lombardo (penalty missed) 55'; Ceramicola 86' (o.g.)	Stadium: Stadio Via del Mare; Referee: Salvatore Racalbuto

6 February 1994 22	Sampdoria	6–2	Udinese	Genoa
	Platt 9'; Jugović 20' (pen.), 30'; R. Mancini 51', 70' (pen.); Amoruso 60'	Report	Pizzi 52'; Desideri 58'	Stadium: Stadio Luigi Ferraris; Referee: Pasquale Rodomonti

13 February 1994 23	Parma	2–1	Sampdoria	Parma
	Minotti 78'; Zola 90'	Report	Jugović 28'	Stadium: Stadio Ennio Tardini; Referee: Pierluigi Collina

20 February 1994 24	Sampdoria	3–1	Atalanta	Genoa
	Gullit 30', 35'; Lombardo 53'	Report	Valentini 85'	Stadium: Stadio Luigi Ferraris; Attendance: 25,122; Referee: Loris Stafoggia

27 February 1994 25	Roma	0–1	Sampdoria	Rome
		Report	R. Mancini 25'	Stadium: Stadio Olimpico; Attendance: 44,539; Referee: Robert Anthony Boggi

6 March 1994 26	Sampdoria	1–0	Torino	Genoa
	Gullit 13'	Report		Stadium: Stadio Luigi Ferraris; Attendance: 28,336; Referee: Virginio Quartuccio

13 March 1994 27	Milan	1–0	Sampdoria	Milan
15:00 CEST (UTC+01:00)	Massaro 25'	Report	Sacchetti (red card) 90'	Stadium: San Siro; Attendance: 79,126; Referee: Loris Stafoggia

20 March 1994 28	Cagliari	0–0	Sampdoria	Cagliari
		Report		Stadium: Stadio Sant'Elia; Referee: Luciano Luci

27 March 1994 29	Sampdoria	6–0	Foggia	Genoa
	Nicoli 1' (o.g.); R. Mancini 8', 90'; Gullit 60'; Platt 81', 88'	Report		Stadium: Stadio Luigi Ferraris; Attendance: 27,000; Referee: Emilio Pellegrino

2 April 1994 30	Cremonese	0–0	Sampdoria	Cremona
		Report		Stadium: Stadio Giovanni Zini; Attendance: 9,882; Referee: Pasquale Rodomonti

10 April 1994 31	Sampdoria	1–1	Genoa	Genoa
	Jugović 15'	Report	Vink 14'	Stadium: Stadio Luigi Ferraris; Attendance: 45,000; Referee: Pierluigi Pairetto

17 April 1994 32	Sampdoria	3–1	Internazionale	Genoa
	Vierchowod 21'; Evani 70'; Amoruso 90'	Report	Battistini 25'	Stadium: Stadio Luigi Ferraris; Attendance: 27,393; Referee: Pierluigi Collina

24 April 1994 33	Reggiana	1–1	Sampdoria	Reggio Emilia
	Esposito 72'	Report	Amoruso 66'	Stadium: Stadio Mirabello; Attendance: 14,217; Referee: Robert Anthony Boggi

1 May 1994 34	Sampdoria	3–4	Lazio	Genoa
	Corino 23' (o.g.); Lombardo 54'; Bertarelli 68'	Report	Casiraghi 21'; Dall'Igna 59' (o.g.); Signori 64', 70'	Stadium: Stadio Luigi Ferraris; Attendance: 26,146; Referee: Fiorenzo Treossi

=== Coppa Italia ===
==== Second round ====
6 October 1993 First leg	Sampdoria	0–0	Pisa	Genoa
20:30 CEST (UTC+01:00)				Stadium: Stadio Luigi Ferraris; Attendance: 8,000; Referee: Loris Stafoggia

27 October 1993 Second leg	Pisa	0–0 (0–0 agg.) (1–3 p)	Sampdoria	Pisa
20:30 CEST (UTC+01:00)				Stadium: Stadio Arena Garibaldi; Attendance: 6,000; Referee: Pierluigi Pairetto
	Penalties
	Cristallini (penalty missed); Farris (penalty scored); Rotella (penalty missed); Bosco (penalty missed)		(penalty scored) Platt; (penalty scored) Vierchowod; (penalty scored) Evani; (penalty missed) Bellucci

==== Round of 16 ====
1 December 1993 First leg	Sampdoria	2–1	Roma	Genoa
18:00 CEST (UTC+01:00)	Lombardo 45'; Salsano 75'		Benedetti 3'	Stadium: Stadio Luigi Ferraris; Referee: Luciano Luci

16 December 1993 Second leg	Roma	2–1 (4–4 agg.) (6–7 p)	Sampdoria	Rome
	Cappioli 6', 51'		Platt 40' (pen.)	Stadium: Stadio Olimpico; Attendance: 16,500; Referee: Loris Stafoggia
	Penalties
	Comi (penalty missed); Cappioli (penalty scored); Carboni (penalty scored); Festa (penalty scored); Giannini (penalty scored); Bonacina (penalty scored); Benedetti (penalty scored); Garzya (penalty missed)		(penalty scored) Platt; (penalty missed) Gullit; (penalty scored) Evani; (penalty scored) Vierchowod; (penalty scored) Mancini; (penalty scored) Lombardo; (penalty scored) Amoruso; (penalty scored) Mannini

==== Quarter-finals ====
6 January 1994 First leg	Sampdoria	1–0	Internazionale	Genoa
	Lombardo 33'			Stadium: Stadio Luigi Ferraris; Attendance: 15,643; Referee: Pierluigi Pairetto

27 January 1994 Second leg	Internazionale	1–1 (1–2 agg.)	Sampdoria	Milan
	Jonk (yellow card) 31'; Fontolan 70'; Tramezzani (yellow card) 85'		Vierchowod (yellow card) 23'; Katanec (yellow card) 42'; Jugović (yellow card) 43'; Evani (yellow card) 74'; Gullit 89'	Stadium: San Siro; Attendance: 12,017; Referee: Pierluigi Collina

==== Semi-finals ====
8 February 1994 First leg	Sampdoria	2–1	Parma	Genoa
	Sacchetti (yellow card) 20'; Lombardo 55'; Platt 56', (yellow card) 59'		Ballotta (yellow card) 10'; Asprilla (yellow card) 21', (goal) 32'; Benarrivo (yellow card) 88'	Stadium: Stadio Luigi Ferraris; Attendance: 17,558; Referee: Livio Bazzoli

23 February 1994 Second leg	Parma	0–1 (1–3 agg.)	Sampdoria	Parma
	Benarrivo (yellow card) 56'		Gullit 21'; Mannini (yellow card) 31'; Vierchowod (yellow card) 44'	Stadium: Stadio Ennio Tardini; Attendance: 14,000; Referee: Gianni Beschin

==== Final ====
6 April 1994 First leg	Ancona	0–0	Sampdoria	Ancona
	Sogliano (yellow card) 23'; Centofanti (yellow card) 60'		Sacchetti (yellow card) 21'; Dall'Igna (yellow card) 67'	Stadium: Stadio del Conero; Attendance: 16,871; Referee: Alfredo Trentalange

20 April 1994 Second leg	Sampdoria	6–1 (6–1 agg.)	Ancona	Genoa
	Vecchiola 50' (o.g.); Lombardo 58', 75'; Vierchowod 65'; Bertarelli 80' (pen.); Evani 85' (pen.)		Fontana (yellow card) 36'; De Angelis (yellow card) 67'; Sogliano (yellow card) 67'; Lupo 72'	Stadium: Stadio Luigi Ferraris; Attendance: 39,000; Referee: Luciano Luci

== Statistics ==
=== Players statistics ===
No.	Pos	Nat	Player	Total		Serie A		Coppa	
No.	Pos	Nat	Player	Apps	Goals	Apps	Goals	Apps	Goals
	GK	(Italy) ITA	Gianluca Pagliuca	44	-45	34	-39	10	-6
	DF	(Italy) ITA	Moreno Mannini	36	0	30	0	6	0
	DF	(Italy) ITA	Pietro Vierchowod	40	3	32	2	8	1
	DF	(Italy) ITA	Stefano Sacchetti	37	1	27+3	1	7	0
	DF	(Italy) ITA	Michele Serena	41	0	26+5	0	10	0
	MF	(Italy) ITA	Attilio Lombardo	44	13	34	8	10	5
	MF	(England) ENG	David Platt	38	11	29	9	9	2
	MF	(Italy) ITA	Alberigo Evani	40	2	30+1	1	9	1
	MF	(Federal Republic of Yugoslavia) YUG	Vladimir Jugović	33	6	26+1	6	6	0
	FW	(Netherlands) NED	Ruud Gullit	41	17	30+1	15	10	2
	FW	(Italy) ITA	Roberto Mancini	36	12	30	12	6	0
	GK	(Italy) ITA	Giulio Nuciari	0	0	0	0	0	0
	DF	(Italy) ITA	Marco Rossi	22	0	14+2	0	6	0
	MF	(Italy) ITA	Giovanni Invernizzi	20	0	9+5	0	6	0
	FW	(Italy) ITA	Mauro Bertarelli	19	3	5+11	2	3	1
	MF	(Italy) ITA	Fausto Salsano	27	1	4+16	0	7	1
	DF	(Italy) ITA	Giovanni Dall'Igna	15	-1	4+7	-1	4	0
	MF	(Slovenia) SVN	Srečko Katanec	7	1	4	1	3	0
	FW	(Italy) ITA	Nicola Amoruso	10	3	3+5	3	2	0
	DF	(Italy) ITA	Roberto Bucchioni	5	0	1+3	0	1	0
	FW	(Italy) ITA	Claudio Bellucci	3	0	0+2	0	1	0
	GK	(Italy) ITA	Matteo Sereni	0	0	0	0	0	0

- Source: http://calcio-seriea.net/presenze/1993/1065/
