= 1989–90 UC Sampdoria season =

Sampdoria
1989–90 season
- Owner: Paolo Mantovani
- Chairman: Paolo Mantovani
- Manager: Vujadin Boškov
- Stadium: Luigi Ferraris
- Serie A: 5th
- Coppa Italia: Group stage
- Supercoppa Italiana: Runners-up
- Cup Winners' Cup: Winners
- Top goalscorer: Roberto Mancini (11)
| Home colours | Away colours | Third colours |

UC Sampdoria won their first ever European trophy, thanks to a Cup Winners' Cup final victory against Anderlecht, thanks to two extra time goals from star striker Gianluca Vialli.

== Squad ==
Note: Flags indicate national team as defined under FIFA eligibility rules; some limited exceptions apply. Players may hold more than one non-FIFA nationality.

| Pos. | Nation | Player |
|---|---|---|
| GK | ITA | Gianluca Pagliuca |
| GK | ITA | Giulio Nuciari |
| GK | ITA | Fabrizio Casazza |
| DF | ITA | Moreno Mannini |
| DF | ITA | Pietro Vierchowod |
| DF | ITA | Luca Pellegrini |
| DF | ITA | Amedeo Carboni |
| DF | ITA | Marco Lanna |
| DF | ITA | Giovanni Dall'Igna |
| MF | YUG | Srečko Katanec |
| MF | ITA | Fausto Pari |

| Pos. | Nation | Player |
|---|---|---|
| MF | ITA | Attilio Lombardo |
| MF | BRA | Toninho Cerezo |
| MF | ITA | Giuseppe Dossena |
| MF | ITA | Fausto Salsano |
| MF | ITA | Giovanni Invernizzi |
| MF | ESP | Víctor Muñoz |
| MF | ITA | Roberto Breda |
| MF | ITA | Alessandro Lupo |
| FW | ITA | Roberto Mancini |
| FW | ITA | Gianluca Vialli |
| FW | ITA | Enrico Chiesa |

=== Transfers ===
In
| Pos. | Name | from | Type |
|---|---|---|---|
| MF | Attilio Lombardo | US Cremonese | |
| MF | Srečko Katanec | VfB Stuttgart | |
| GK | Giulio Nuciari | AC Monza | |
| DF | Giovanni Dall'Igna | | |
| MF | Giovanni Invernizzi | Como | |

Out
| Pos. | Name | to | Type |
|---|---|---|---|
| DF | Stefano Pellegrini | AS Roma | |
| GK | Guido Bistazzoni | Padova | |
| MF | Fulvio Bonomi | US Cremonese | |

== Competitions ==
=== Supercoppa Italiana ===
| 29 November 1989 | Internazionale | 2–0 | Sampdoria | Milan |
| | Cucchi 37'; Serena 86' | | | Stadium: San Siro; Attendance: 7,221; Referee: Carlo Longhi |

=== Serie A ===
==== League table ====
| Pos | Team | Pld | W | D | L | GF | GA | GD | Pts | Qualification or relegation |
|---|---|---|---|---|---|---|---|---|---|---|
| 3 | Internazionale | 34 | 17 | 10 | 7 | 55 | 32 | +23 | 44 | Qualification to UEFA Cup |
| 4 | Juventus | 34 | 15 | 14 | 5 | 56 | 36 | +20 | 44 | Qualification to Cup Winners' Cup |
| 5 | Sampdoria (Note: Sampdoria qualified for the 1990–91 European Cup Winners' Cup as defending champions.) | 34 | 16 | 11 | 7 | 46 | 26 | +20 | 43 | Qualification to Cup Winners' Cup |
| 6 | Roma | 34 | 14 | 13 | 7 | 45 | 40 | +5 | 41 | Qualification to UEFA Cup |
| 7 | Atalanta | 34 | 12 | 11 | 11 | 36 | 43 | −7 | 35 | Qualification to UEFA Cup |

Source: 1989–90 Serie A, RSSSF.com
Rules for classification: 1) Points; 2) Head-to-head points; 3) Head-to-head goal difference; 4) Goal difference; 5) Goals scored; 6) Draw.

==== Results summary ====
| Overall | | | | | | | | Home | | | | | | Away | | | | | |
| Pld | W | D | L | GF | GA | GD | Pts | W | D | L | GF | GA | GD | W | D | L | GF | GA | GD |
|---|---|---|---|---|---|---|---|---|---|---|---|---|---|---|---|---|---|---|---|
| 34 | 16 | 11 | 7 | 46 | 26 | +20 | 59 | 11 | 6 | 0 | 26 | 6 | +20 | 5 | 5 | 7 | 20 | 20 | 0 |

Source: Worldfootball

==== Results by round ====
| Round | 1 | 2 | 3 | 4 | 5 | 6 | 7 | 8 | 9 | 10 | 11 | 12 | 13 | 14 | 15 | 16 | 17 | 18 | 19 | 20 | 21 | 22 | 23 | 24 | 25 | 26 | 27 | 28 | 29 | 30 | 31 | 32 | 33 | 34 |
|---|---|---|---|---|---|---|---|---|---|---|---|---|---|---|---|---|---|---|---|---|---|---|---|---|---|---|---|---|---|---|---|---|---|---|
| Ground | A | H | A | H | A | H | A | H | A | A | H | A | H | A | H | A | H | H | A | H | A | H | A | H | A | H | H | A | H | A | H | A | H | A |
| Result | W | D | L | W | D | W | W | W | L | L | W | D | W | D | D | W | D | W | W | W | L | W | D | D | L | W | D | D | W | L | W | L | D | W |
| Position | 1 | 2 | 7 | 5 | 6 | 5 | 3 | 2 | 2 | 5 | 3 | 3 | 2 | 2 | 3 | 2 | 3 | 3 | 3 | 2 | 4 | 3 | 3 | 3 | 5 | 4 | 3 | 4 | 3 | 4 | 4 | 5 | 5 | 5 |

Source: Competitive matches
A = Away; H = Home; W = Win; D = Draw; L = Loss; = 1990–91 European Cup; = 1990–91 UEFA Cup; = Relegation to 1990–91 Serie B

==== Matches ====
| 27 August 1989 1 | Lazio | 0–2 | Sampdoria | Rome |
| | | Report | Pellegrini 29'; Vialli 34' | Stadium: Stadio Olimpico; Referee: Luigi Agnolin |

| 3 September 1989 2 | Sampdoria | 0–0 | Bari | Genoa |
| | | Report | | Stadium: Stadio Luigi Ferraris; Referee: Virginio Quartuccio |

| 6 September 1989 3 | Ascoli | 2–1 | Sampdoria | Ascoli Piceno |
| | Cvetković 84', 87' | Report | Salsano 83' | Stadium: Stadio Cino e Lillo Del Duca; Referee: Pietro D'Elia |

| 10 September 1989 4 | Sampdoria | 2–0 | Internazionale | Genoa |
| | Vialli 33'; Cerezo 70' | Report | | Stadium: Stadio Luigi Ferraris; Referee: Luigi Agnolin |

| 17 September 1989 5 | Udinese | 3–3 | Sampdoria | Udine |
| | Sensini 26'; Gallego 28'; Balbo 36' | Report | Paganin 40' (o.g.); Vialli 69'; Katanec 85' | Stadium: Stadio Friuli; Referee: Pierluigi Pairetto |

| 24 September 1989 6 | Sampdoria | 1–0 | Atalanta | Genoa |
| | Katanec 39' | Report | | Stadium: Stadio Luigi Ferraris; Referee: Carlo Sguizzato |

| 1 October 1989 7 | Genoa | 1–2 | Sampdoria | Genoa |
| | Fontolan 19' | Report | Vialli 44'; Mancini 60' | Stadium: Stadio Luigi Ferraris; Referee: Pietro D'Elia |

| 8 October 1989 8 | Sampdoria | 1–0 | Hellas Verona | Genoa |
| | Vialli 16' | Report | | Stadium: Stadio Luigi Ferraris; Referee: Marcello Nicchi |

| 22 October 1989 9 | Fiorentina | 3–1 | Sampdoria | Florence |
| | Volpecina 24'; Battistini 34'; Baggio 53' | Report | Mancini 36' | Stadium: Stadio Artemio Franchi; Referee: Rosario Lo Bello |

| 29 October 1989 10 | Juventus | 1–0 | Sampdoria | Turin |
| | Aleinikov 34' | Report | | Stadium: Stadio Comunale; Referee: Carlo Longhi |

| 5 November 1989 11 | Sampdoria | 4–2 | Roma | Genoa |
| | Salsano 24'; Mancini 43'; Vialli 55' 86' | Report | Desideri 48'; Rizzitelli 73' | Stadium: Stadio Luigi Ferraris; Referee: Pierluigi Pairetto |

| 19 November 1989 12 | Napoli | 1–1 | Sampdoria | Naples |
| | Maradona 24' (pen.) | Report | Dossena 60' | Stadium: Stadio San Paolo; Referee: Luigi Agnolin |

| 26 November 1989 13 | Sampdoria | 3–0 | Bologna | Genoa |
| | Dossena 57'; Lombardo 66'; Vialli 71' | Report | | Stadium: Stadio Luigi Ferraris; Referee: Rosario Lo Bello |

| 3 December 1989 14 | Lecce | 0–0 | Sampdoria | Lecce |
| | | Report | | Stadium: Stadio Via del Mare; Referee: Tullio Lanese |

| 10 December 1989 15 | Sampdoria | 1–1 | Milan | Genoa |
| | Vierchowod 65' | Report | Ancelotti 70' | Stadium: Stadio Luigi Ferraris; Referee: Pietro D'Elia |

| 17 December 1989 16 | Cesena | 1–2 | Sampdoria | Cesena |
| | Zagati 74' | Report | Mancini 8'; Cerezo 50' | Stadium: Stadio Dino Manuzzi; Referee: Pierluigi Pairetto |

| 30 December 1989 17 | Sampdoria | 1–1 | Cremonese | Genoa |
| | Mancini 50' (pen.) | Report | Dezotti 49' | Stadium: Stadio Luigi Ferraris; Referee: Marcello Nicchi |

| 7 January 1990 18 | Sampdoria | 2–0 | Lazio | Genoa |
| | Mancini 82' 86' (pen.) | Report | | Stadium: Stadio Luigi Ferraris; Referee: Rosario Lo Bello |

| 14 January 1990 19 | Bari | 0–2 | Sampdoria | Bari |
| | | Report | Mancini 52' (pen.); Lombardo 79' | Stadium: Stadio della Vittoria; Referee: Sergio Coppetelli |

| 17 January 1990 20 | Sampdoria | 2–0 | Ascoli | Genoa |
| | Lombardo 54' 70' | Report | | Stadium: Stadio Luigi Ferraris; Referee: Virginio Quartuccio |

| 21 January 1990 21 | Internazionale | 2–0 | Sampdoria | Milan |
| | Matthäus 31', 41' | Report | | Stadium: San Siro; Referee: Pietro D'Elia |

| 28 January 1990 22 | Sampdoria | 3–1 | Udinese | Genoa |
| | Mancini 10', 26'; Lombardo 53' | Report | Branca 11' | Stadium: Stadio Luigi Ferraris; Referee: Carlo Sguizzato |

| 4 February 1990 23 | Atalanta | 2–2 | Sampdoria | Bergamo |
| | Madonna 16' (pen.); Porrini 31' | Report | Katanec 22', 76' | Stadium: Stadio Atleti Azzurri d'Italia; Referee: Luigi Agnolin |

| 11 February 1990 24 | Sampdoria | 0–0 | Genoa | Genoa |
| | | Report | | Stadium: Stadio Luigi Ferraris; Referee: Tullio Lanese |

| 18 February 1990 25 | Hellas Verona | 1–0 | Sampdoria | Verona |
| | Pellegrini 35' | Report | | Stadium: Stadio Marcantonio Bentegodi; Referee: Arcangelo Pezzella |

| 25 February 1990 26 | Sampdoria | 3–0 | Fiorentina | Genoa |
| | Vierchowod 41'; Lombardo 69'; Vialli 78' | Report | | Stadium: Stadio Luigi Ferraris; Referee: Paolo Fabricatore |

| 4 March 1990 27 | Sampdoria | 0–0 | Juventus | Genoa |
| | | Report | | Stadium: Stadio Luigi Ferraris; Referee: Luciano Luci |

| 11 March 1990 28 | Roma | 1–1 | Sampdoria | Rome |
| | Conti 34' | Report | Vierchowod 78' | Stadium: Stadio Olimpico; Referee: Loris Stafoggia |

| 18 March 1990 29 | Sampdoria | 2–1 | Napoli | Genoa |
| | Dossena 37'; Lombardo 67' | Report | Careca 50' | Stadium: Stadio Luigi Ferraris; Referee: Rosario Lo Bello |

| 25 March 1990 30 | Bologna | 1–0 | Sampdoria | Bologna |
| | Giordano 48' | Report | | Stadium: Stadio Renato Dall'Ara; Referee: Alfredo Trentalange |

| 8 April 1990 31 | Sampdoria | 1–0 | Lecce | Genoa |
| | Carboni 25' | Report | | Stadium: Stadio Luigi Ferraris; Referee: Pierluigi Magni |

| 13 April 1990 32 | Milan | 1–0 | Sampdoria | Milan |
| | Massaro 61' | Report | | Stadium: San Siro; Referee: Carlo Longhi |

| 22 April 1990 33 | Sampdoria | 0–0 | Cesena | Genoa |
| | | Report | | Stadium: Stadio Luigi Ferraris; Referee: Tullio Lanese |

| 29 April 1990 34 | Cremonese | 0–3 | Sampdoria | Cremona |
| | | Report | Vialli 12'; Katanec 23'; Mancini 35' | Stadium: Stadio Giovanni Zini; Referee: Giovanni Merlino |

==== Top Scorers ====
- (Italy) Roberto Mancini 11
- (Italy) Gianluca Vialli 10
- (Italy) Attilio Lombardo 6
- (Socialist Federal Republic of Yugoslavia) Srečko Katanec 4

=== Coppa Italia ===
==== First round ====
| 23 August 1989 | Prato | 0–2 | Sampdoria | Carrara |
| 20:45 CEST | | | Vialli 35'; Salsano 86' | Stadium: Stadio dei Marmi; Referee: Carlo Sguizzato |

==== Second round ====
| 30 August 1989 | Genoa | 0–1 | Sampdoria | Genoa |
| 16:00 CEST | | | Vialli 34' (pen.) | Stadium: Stadio Luigi Ferraris; Referee: Carlo Longhi |

==== Group stage (Group 4) ====
| Pos | Team | Pld | W | D | L | GF | GA | GD | Pts |
|---|---|---|---|---|---|---|---|---|---|
| 1 | Juventus | 2 | 2 | 0 | 0 | 3 | 1 | +2 | 4 |
| 2 | Sampdoria | 2 | 1 | 0 | 1 | 3 | 3 | 0 | 2 |
| 3 | Pescara | 2 | 0 | 0 | 2 | 1 | 3 | −2 | 0 |

| 3 January 1990 1 | Sampdoria | 2–1 | Pescara | Genoa |
| 14:30 CET | Mancini 20', 82' | | Edmar 58' | Stadium: Stadio Luigi Ferraris; Attendance: 8,490; Referee: Giancarlo Dal Forno |

| 24 January 1990 2 | Juventus | 2–1 | Sampdoria | Turin |
| 14:30 CET | Marocchi 6'; De Agostini 87' (pen.) | | Katanec 22' | Stadium: Stadio Comunale; Attendance: 9,825; Referee: Tullio Lanese |

=== European Cup Winners' Cup ===
==== First round ====
| 13 September 1989 First leg | Brann (Norway) | 0–2 | (Italy) Sampdoria | Bergen, Norway |
| | | Report | Vialli 40'; Mancini 55' | Stadium: Brann Stadion; Attendance: 16,789; Referee: Bill Crombie (Scotland) |

| 26 September 1989 Second leg | Sampdoria (Italy) | 1–0 (3–0 agg.) | (Norway) Brann | Genoa, Italy |
| | Katanec 75' | Report | | Stadium: Stadio Luigi Ferraris; Attendance: 9,460; Referee: Borislav Aleksandrov (Bulgaria) |

==== Second round ====
| 17 October 1989 First leg | Borussia Dortmund (West Germany) | 1–1 | (Italy) Sampdoria | Dortmund, West Germany |
| | Wegmann 64' | Report | Mancini 88' | Stadium: Westfalenstadion; Attendance: 45,560; Referee: Alexey Spirin (Soviet Union) |

| 1 November 1989 Second leg | Sampdoria (Italy) | 2–0 (3–1 agg.) | (West Germany) Borussia Dortmund | Genoa, Italy |
| | Vialli 74' (pen.), 88' | Report | | Stadium: Stadio Luigi Ferraris; Attendance: 32,683; Referee: Marcel Van Langenhove (Belgium) |

==== Quarter-finals ====
| 7 March 1990 First leg | Sampdoria (Italy) | 2–0 | (Switzerland) Grasshopper | Genoa, Italy |
| | Vierchowod 13'; Meier 84' (o.g.) | Report | | Stadium: Stadio Luigi Ferraris; Attendance: 31,323; Referee: Peter Mikkelsen (Denmark) |

| 22 March 1990 Second leg | Grasshopper (Switzerland) | 1–2 (1–4 agg.) | (Italy) Sampdoria | Zurich, Switzerland |
| | Wyss 67' | Report | Cerezo 43'; Lombardo 81' | Stadium: Hardturm; Attendance: 28,700; Referee: Zoran Petrović (Yugoslavia) |

==== Semi-finals ====
| 3 April 1990 First leg | Monaco (France) | 2–2 | (Italy) Sampdoria | Monaco |
| | Weah 44'; Díaz 81' | Report | Vialli 75' (pen.), 78' | Stadium: Stade Louis II; Attendance: 16,966; Referee: Siegfried Kirschen (East Germany) |

| 18 April 1990 Second leg | Sampdoria (Italy) | 2–0 (4–2 agg.) | (France) Monaco | Genoa, Italy |
| | Vierchowod 9'; Lombardo 12' | Report | | Stadium: Stadio Luigi Ferraris; Attendance: 35,577; Referee: José Rosa dos Santos (Portugal) |

==== Final ====
| 9 May 1990 | Sampdoria (Italy) | 2–0 (a.e.t.) | (Belgium) Anderlecht | Gothenburg, Sweden |
| 20:15 | Vialli 105', 107' | Report | | Stadium: Ullevi; Attendance: 20,103; Referee: Bruno Galler (Switzerland) |

== Statistics ==
=== Players statistics ===
| No. | Pos | Nat | Player | Total | | Serie A | | Coppa | | ECWC | |
| No. | Pos | Nat | Player | Apps | Goals | Apps | Goals | Apps | Goals | Apps | Goals |
|---|---|---|---|---|---|---|---|---|---|---|---|
| | GK | (Italy) ITA | Gianluca Pagliuca | 34 | -26 | 34 | -26 | | | | |
| | DF | (Italy) ITA | Moreno Mannini | 29 | 0 | 29 | 0 | | | | |
| | DF | (Italy) ITA | Pietro Vierchowod | 32 | 3 | 32 | 3 | | | | |
| | DF | (Italy) ITA | Luca Pellegrini | 18 | 1 | 18 | 1 | | | | |
| | DF | (Socialist Federal Republic of Yugoslavia) YUG | Srečko Katanec | 27 | 5 | 25+2 | 5 | | | | |
| | MF | (Italy) ITA | Attilio Lombardo | 34 | 7 | 27+7 | 7 | | | | |
| | MF | (Italy) ITA | Fausto Pari | 33 | 0 | 33 | 0 | | | | |
| | MF | (Brazil) BRA | Toninho Cerezo | 21 | 2 | 21 | 2 | | | | |
| | MF | (Italy) ITA | Giuseppe Dossena | 34 | 3 | 34 | 3 | | | | |
| | FW | (Italy) ITA | Roberto Mancini | 31 | 11 | 31 | 11 | | | | |
| | FW | (Italy) ITA | Gianluca Vialli | 22 | 10 | 20+2 | 10 | | | | |
| | GK | (Italy) ITA | Giulio Nuciari | 0 | 0 | 0 | 0 | | | | |
| | MF | (Italy) ITA | Fausto Salsano | 32 | 2 | 20+12 | 2 | | | | |
| | DF | (Italy) ITA | Amedeo Carboni | 29 | 1 | 18+11 | 1 | | | | |
| | MF | (Italy) ITA | Giovanni Invernizzi | 18 | 0 | 12+6 | 0 | | | | |
| | MF | (Spain) ESP | Víctor Muñoz | 17 | 0 | 10+7 | 0 | | | | |
| | DF | (Italy) ITA | Marco Lanna | 16 | 0 | 10+6 | 0 | | | | |
| | DF | (Italy) ITA | Giovanni Dall'Igna | 0 | 0 | 0 | 0 | | | | |
| | MF | (Italy) ITA | Roberto Breda | 0 | 0 | 0 | 0 | | | | |
| | MF | (Italy) ITA | Alessandro Lupo | 0 | 0 | 0 | 0 | | | | |
| | GK | (Italy) ITA | Fabrizio Casazza | | | | | | | | |

- Source: http://calcio-seriea.net/rose/1989/995/

== Sources ==
- RSSSF - Italy 1989/90
