= 1992–93 UC Sampdoria season =

Sampdoria
1992–93 season
- Chairman: Enrico Mantovani
- Manager: Sven-Göran Eriksson
- Stadium: Stadio Luigi Ferraris
- Serie A: 7th
- Coppa Italia: Second round
- Top goalscorer: Roberto Mancini (15)
Home colours	Away colours	Third colours

UC Sampdoria continued its decline and finished in seventh position in Serie A, once again missing out on international competitions. New coach Sven-Göran Eriksson came to a squad that had lost its main striker Gianluca Vialli, but despite his absence Sampdoria scored 50 goals in 34 matches, but the defence leaked in an uncharacteristic manner for Eriksson's teams.

== Squad ==
Note: Flags indicate national team as defined under FIFA eligibility rules; some limited exceptions apply. Players may hold more than one non-FIFA nationality.

Pos.	Nation	Player
GK	ITA	Gianluca Pagliuca
GK	ITA	Giulio Nuciari
DF	ITA	Moreno Mannini
DF	ITA	Stefano Sacchetti
DF	ITA	Pietro Vierchowod
DF	ITA	Marco Lanna
DF	ITA	Michele Serena
DF	ENG	Des Walker
DF	ITA	Roberto Bucchioni
DF	SVN	Srečko Katanec

Pos.	Nation	Player
MF	YUG	Vladimir Jugović
MF	ITA	Ivano Bonetti
MF	ITA	Nicola Zanini
MF	ITA	Eugenio Corini
MF	ITA	Attilio Lombardo
MF	ITA	Giovanni Invernizzi
FW	ITA	Enrico Chiesa
FW	ITA	Renato Buso
FW	ITA	Roberto Mancini
FW	ITA	Mauro Bertarelli

=== Transfers ===
In
Pos.	Name	from	Type
MF	Vladimir Jugovic	Crvena Zvezda	-
DF	Des Walker	Nottingham Forest	-
MF	Eugenio Corini	Juventus	
FW	Mauro Bertarelli	Juventus	-
DF	Michele Serena	Juventus	-
MF	Nicola Zanini	Juventus	-
DF	Stefano Sacchetti	Modena F.C.	-

Out
Pos.	Name	To	Type
FW	Gianluca Vialli	Juventus	-
MF	Toninho Cerezo	Sao Paulo FC	-
MF	Paulo Silas	SC Internacional	-
MF	Fausto Pari	S.S.C. Napoli	-
DF	Alessandro Orlando	Udinese Calcio	-
DF	Dario Bonetti	SPAL	-

== Competitions ==
=== Serie A ===
==== League table ====
Pos	Team	Pld	W	D	L	GF	GA	GD	Pts	Qualification or relegation
5	Lazio	34	13	12	9	65	51	+14	38	Qualification to UEFA Cup
6	Cagliari	34	14	9	11	45	33	+12	37	Qualification to UEFA Cup
7	Sampdoria	34	12	12	10	50	48	+2	36	
8	Atalanta	34	14	8	12	42	44	−2	36	
9	Torino	34	9	17	8	38	38	0	35	Qualification to Cup Winners' Cup

Source: 1992–93 Serie A, RSSSF.com
Rules for classification: 1) Points; 2) Head-to-head points; 3) Head-to-head goal difference; 4) Goal difference; 5) Goals scored; 6) Draw.(Note:

==== Results summary ====
Overall								Home						Away					
Pld	W	D	L	GF	GA	GD	Pts	W	D	L	GF	GA	GD	W	D	L	GF	GA	GD
34	12	12	10	50	48	+2	48	8	5	4	33	23	+10	4	7	6	17	25	−8

Source: Worldfootball

==== Results by round ====
Round	1	2	3	4	5	6	7	8	9	10	11	12	13	14	15	16	17	18	19	20	21	22	23	24	25	26	27	28	29	30	31	32	33	34	35
Ground	H	A	A	H	A	H	A	H	A	H	A	H	A	H	H	H	A	H	A	H	H	A	H	A	H	A	H	A	H	A	H	A	A	H	A
Result	D	W	W	P	D	W	L	W	D	W	L	L	D	L	D	D	D	W	L	W	W	L	L	W	W	D	L	D	W	W	D	L	D	D	L
Position	6	2	2	3	5	2	5	4	5	3	4	7	5	5	6	5	6	4	6	5	4	6	8	6	3	4	6	6	6	6	5	6	6	6	7

Source: Competitive matches
A = Away; H = Home; W = Win; D = Draw; L = Loss; = Leader, 1993–94 UEFA Champions League; = 1993–94 UEFA Cup; = 1993–94 Serie B

==== Matches ====
6 September 1992 1	Sampdoria	3–3	Lazio	Genoa
	Fuser 6' (o.g.); Jugović 33'; R. Mancini 53' (pen.)	Report	Signori 19', 22'; Buso 75' (o.g.)	Stadium: Stadio Luigi Ferraris; Referee: Arcangelo Pezzella

13 September 1992 2	Ancona	2–3	Sampdoria	Ancona
	Ermini 37'; Detari 44'	Report	Jugović 24'; Katanec (red card) 39'; R. Mancini 59'; Ruggeri 76' (o.g.)	Stadium: Stadio del Conero; Referee: Alfredo Trentalange

20 September 1992 3	Udinese	1–2	Sampdoria	Udine
	Balbo 58'	Report	Jugović 24'; R. Mancini (red card) 86'; Lombardo 87'	Stadium: Stadio Friuli; Referee: Walter Cinciripini

4 October 1992 5	Torino	2–2	Sampdoria	Turin
	Silenzi 34'; Carlos Aguilera 64'	Report	Annoni 13' (o.g.); Vierchowod 86'	Stadium: Stadio Olimpico; Referee: Angelo Amendolia

18 October 1992 6	Sampdoria	2–0	Cagliari	Genoa
	Corini 14', 68' (pen.); Invernizzi (red card) 84'	Report		Stadium: Stadio Luigi Ferraris; Referee: Robert Anthony Boggi

25 October 1992 7	Fiorentina	4–0	Sampdoria	Florence
	Baiano 1', 78' (pen.); Batistuta 68', 83'	Report		Stadium: Stadio Artemio Franchi; Referee: Maurizio Mughetti

1 November 1992 8	Sampdoria	4–1	Genoa	Genoa
	Fortunato 2' (o.g.); Lanna 38'; Jugović 86'; Bertarelli 90'	Report	Padovano 80'; Caricola (red card) 83'	Stadium: Stadio Luigi Ferraris; Referee: Marcello Nicchi

8 November 1992 9	Internazionale	0–0	Sampdoria	Milan
		Report		Stadium: San Siro; Referee: Carlo Sguizzato

22 November 1992 10	Sampdoria	3–1	Napoli	Genoa
	Ziliani 42' (o.g.); Jugović 60'; R. Mancini 78' (pen.)	Report	Mannini 89' (o.g.)	Stadium: Stadio Luigi Ferraris; Referee: Gianni Beschin

29 November 1992 11	Parma	1–0	Sampdoria	Parma
	Asprilla 51'	Report		Stadium: Stadio Ennio Tardini; Referee: Pierluigi Pairetto

6 December 1992 12	Sampdoria	2–3	Atalanta	Genoa
	R. Mancini 63'; Corini 70' (pen.)	Report	Ganz 28', 42'; Rambaudi 65'	Stadium: Stadio Luigi Ferraris; Referee: Stefano Braschi

13 December 1992 13	Pescara	2–2	Sampdoria	Pescara
	Massara 9'; Allegri 42' (pen.)	Report	Jugović 2'; R. Mancini 40' (pen.)	Stadium: Stadio Adriatico; Referee: Pierluigi Collina

23 December 1992 4	Sampdoria	1–2	Milan	Genoa
	Bonetti 45', (yellow card) 60'; Invernizzi (yellow card) 59'	Report	Simone 28'; Albertini (yellow card) 32'; Lentini (yellow card) 55'; Gullit 58'; Costacurta (yellow card) 73'	Stadium: Stadio Luigi Ferraris; Attendance: 39,350; Referee: Fabio Baldas
Note: The game, originally scheduled for 27 September 1992, was postponed due to rain.

3 January 1993 14	Sampdoria	3–3	Foggia	Genoa
	R. Mancini 22', 27', 46'	Report	Biagioni 3' (pen.); Bresciani 7'; Bianchini 80'	Stadium: Stadio Luigi Ferraris; Referee: Piero Ceccarini

10 January 1993 15	Sampdoria	1–1	Juventus	Genoa
	Lombardo 6'	Report	Möller 36'	Stadium: Stadio Luigi Ferraris; Referee: Carlo Sguizzato

17 January 1993 16	Roma	0–0	Sampdoria	Rome
		Report		Stadium: Stadio Olimpico; Referee: Angelo Amendolia

24 January 1993 17	Sampdoria	1–0	Brescia	Genoa
	Corini 45'; Lanna (red card) 47'	Report		Stadium: Stadio Luigi Ferraris; Referee: Paolo Fabricatore

31 January 1993 18	Lazio	2–1	Sampdoria	Rome
	Riedle 7'; Stroppa 86'	Report	Pagliuca (red card) 82'; R. Mancini 88'	Stadium: Stadio Olimpico; Referee: Roberto Bettin

7 February 1993 19	Sampdoria	3–1	Ancona	Genoa
	Jugović 10'; Chiesa 84'; R. Mancini 85'	Report	Vecchiola 9'	Stadium: Stadio Luigi Ferraris; Referee: Massimo Chiesa

14 February 1993 20	Sampdoria	2–0	Udinese	Genoa
	Buso 54'; Serena 80'	Report	Balbo (penalty missed) 25'	Stadium: Stadio Luigi Ferraris; Referee: Loris Stafoggia

28 February 1993 21	Milan	4–0	Sampdoria	Milan
	Lentini 7', 70'; Papin 27', 89'	Report		Stadium: San Siro; Attendance: 76,101; Referee: Piero Ceccarini

7 March 1993 22	Sampdoria	0–1	Torino	Genoa
		Report	Poggi 72'	Stadium: Stadio Luigi Ferraris; Referee: Pasquale Rodomonti

14 March 1993 23	Cagliari	0–2	Sampdoria	Cagliari
		Report	R. Mancini 24', 69'; Lanna (red card) 84'	Stadium: Stadio Sant'Elia; Referee: Marcello Cardona

21 March 1993 24	Sampdoria	2–0	Fiorentina	Genoa
	Baiano 44' (o.g.); Pioli 90+3' (o.g.)	Report	Luppi (red card) 90'	Stadium: Stadio Luigi Ferraris; Referee: Pierluigi Pairetto

28 March 1993 25	Genoa	0–0	Sampdoria	Genoa
		Report		Stadium: Stadio Luigi Ferraris; Referee: Fabio Baldas

4 April 1993 26	Sampdoria	1–3	Internazionale	Genoa
	Jugović 75'	Report	Schillaci 2', 21'; Berti 68'	Stadium: Stadio Luigi Ferraris; Referee: Maurizio Mughetti

10 April 1993 27	Napoli	1–1	Sampdoria	Naples
	Zola 13'	Report	Lombardo 27'; Vierchowod (red card) 79'	Stadium: Stadio San Paolo; Referee: Loris Stafoggia

17 April 1993 28	Sampdoria	2–1	Parma	Genoa
	R. Mancini 30' (pen.); Lombardo 52'	Report	Pizzi 87'	Stadium: Stadio Luigi Ferraris; Referee: Robert Anthony Boggi

25 April 1993 29	Atalanta	1–2	Sampdoria	Bergamo
	Rambaudi (red card) 49'; Minaudo 82'	Report	Lombardo 33'; Bertarelli 87'	Stadium: Stadio Atleti Azzurri d'Italia; Referee: Marcello Nicchi

9 May 1993 30	Sampdoria	1–1	Pescara	Genoa
	R. Mancini 9'	Report	Allegri 38'	Stadium: Stadio Luigi Ferraris; Referee: Cosimo Bolognino

16 May 1993 31	Foggia	1–0	Sampdoria	Foggia
	Kolyvanov 2'	Report		Stadium: Stadio Pino Zaccheria; Referee: Robert Anthony Boggi

23 May 1993 32	Juventus	1–1	Sampdoria	Turin
	Platt 47'	Report	Jugović 4'	Stadium: Stadio Olimpico; Referee: Arcangelo Pezzella

30 May 1993 33	Sampdoria	2–2	Roma	Genoa
	Lanna (red card) 38'; Invernizzi 43'; R. Mancini 89' (pen.)	Report	Carnevale 75'; Rizzitelli 77'	Stadium: Stadio Luigi Ferraris; Referee: Massimo Chiesa

6 June 1993 34	Brescia	3–1	Sampdoria	Brescia
	Negro 12'; Bonometti (red card) 33'; Domini 48'; Răducioiu 80' (pen.)	Report	Chiesa 35'	Stadium: Stadio Mario Rigamonti; Referee: Pierluigi Pairetto

=== Coppa Italia ===
==== Second round ====
26 August 1992 First leg	Sampdoria	2–1	Cesena	Genoa
	Lanna 51'; Jugović 73'		Pazzaglia 90'	Stadium: Stadio Luigi Ferraris; Referee: Paolo Fabricatore

2 September 1992 Second leg	Cesena	1–0 (2a–2 agg.)	Sampdoria	Cesena
	Leoni 73'			Stadium: Stadio Dino Manuzzi; Referee: Massimo Chiesa

== Statistics ==
=== Players statistics ===
No.	Pos	Nat	Player	Total		Serie A		Coppa	
No.	Pos	Nat	Player	Apps	Goals	Apps	Goals	Apps	Goals
	GK	(Italy) ITA	Pagliuca	29	-39	29	-39		
	DF	(Italy) ITA	Mannini	29	-1	27	-1	2	0
	DF	(Italy) ITA	Vierchowod	30	1	29	1	1	0
	DF	(England) ENG	Walker	32	0	27+3	0	2	0
	DF	(Italy) ITA	Lanna	33	2	31	1	2	1
	DF	(Italy) ITA	Serena	36	1	24+10	1	2	0
	MF	(Italy) ITA	Lombardo	36	6	34	6	2	0
	MF	(Italy) ITA	Corini	26	4	22+2	4	2	0
	MF	(Italy) ITA	Invernizzi	26	1	21+5	1		
	MF	(Federal Republic of Yugoslavia) YUG	Jugovic	35	10	33	9	2	1
	FW	(Italy) ITA	Mancini	32	15	30	15	2	0
	GK	(Italy) ITA	Nuciari	7	-10	5	-8	2	-2
	DF	(Italy) ITA	Sacchetti	22	0	20+1	0	1	0
	FW	(Italy) ITA	Chiesa	26	1	17+9	1		
	MF	(Italy) ITA	Bonetti	14	1	9+4	1	1	0
	FW	(Italy) ITA	Buso	17	1	6+9	1	2	0
	FW	(Italy) ITA	Bertarelli	28	2	4+22	2	2	0
	MF	(Slovenia) SVN	Katanec	4	0	4	0		
	DF	(Italy) ITA	Bucchioni	2	0	2	0		
	MF	(Italy) ITA	Zanini	1	0	0+1	0		
	DF	(Italy) ITA	Lamonica	0	0	0	0		
	GK	(Italy) ITA	Di Latte	0	0	0	0		

- Source: http://calcio-seriea.net/presenze/1992/1046/

== Sources ==
- RSSSF - Italy 1992/93
