= 1990 European Super Cup =

Sampdoria	Milan
(Italy)	(Italy)
1	3
- on aggregate

First leg
Sampdoria	Milan
1	1
- Date: 10 October 1990
- Venue: Stadio Luigi Ferraris, Genoa
- Referee: José Rosa dos Santos (Portugal)
- Attendance: 19,724

Second leg
Milan	Sampdoria
2	0
- Date: 29 November 1990
- Venue: Stadio Renato Dall'Ara, Bologna
- Referee: Zoran Petrović (Yugoslavia)
- Attendance: 20,942

The 1990 European Super Cup was played between 1989–90 European Cup winners Milan and 1989–90 European Cup Winners' Cup winners Sampdoria, with Milan winning 3–1 on aggregate.

Milan chose to play their home leg away from their home city due to the poor condition of the turf at the San Siro Stadium, which had hosted several matches at the recent 1990 FIFA World Cup.

== Match details ==
=== First leg ===
10 October 1990
20:30

Sampdoria (Italy)	1–1	(Italy) Milan
Mykhaylychenko 31'	Report	Evani 39'

Stadio Luigi Ferraris, Genoa
Attendance: 19,724
Referee: José Rosa dos Santos (Portugal)

Sampdoria	Milan

GK	1	(Italy) Gianluca Pagliuca
RB	2	(Italy) Moreno Mannini
LB	3	(Italy) Giovanni Invernizzi
CM	4	(Italy) Fausto Pari
CB	5	(Italy) Marco Lanna
CB	6	(Italy) Luca Pellegrini (c)
CM	7	(Soviet Union) Oleksiy Mykhaylychenko
RM	8	(Italy) Attilio Lombardo
CF	9	(Italy) Marco Branca
CF	10	(Italy) Roberto Mancini
LM	11	(Italy) Giuseppe Dossena
Substitutes:
GK	12	(Italy) Giulio Nuciari
DF	13	(Italy) Giovanni Dall'Igna
FW	14	(Italy) Umberto Calcagno
MF	15	(Brazil) Toninho Cerezo
Manager:
(Socialist Federal Republic of Yugoslavia) Vujadin Boškov

GK	1	(Italy) Andrea Pazzagli
RB	2	(Italy) Mauro Tassotti
LB	3	(Italy) Alessandro Costacurta
CM	4	(Italy) Gianluca Gaudenzi
CB	5	(Italy) Filippo Galli
CB	6	(Italy) Franco Baresi (c)
RM	7	(Italy) Roberto Donadoni
CM	8	(Italy) Carlo Ancelotti
CF	9	(Italy) Daniele Massaro
AM	10	(Netherlands) Ruud Gullit
LM	11	(Italy) Alberico Evani
Substitutes:
GK	12	(Italy) Sebastiano Rossi
DF	13	(Italy) Stefano Nava
MF	14	(Italy) Giovanni Stroppa
MF	15	(Netherlands) Frank Rijkaard
FW	16	(Italy) Massimo Agostini
Manager:
(Italy) Arrigo Sacchi

=== Second leg ===
29 November 1990
20:30

Milan (Italy)	2–0	(Italy) Sampdoria
Gullit 44'; Rijkaard 76'	Report

Stadio Renato Dall'Ara, Bologna
Attendance: 20,942
Referee: Zoran Petrović (Yugoslavia)

Milan	Sampdoria

GK	1	(Italy) Andrea Pazzagli
RB	2	(Italy) Mauro Tassotti
LB	3	(Italy) Paolo Maldini
CM	4	(Italy) Angelo Carbone
CB	5	(Italy) Alessandro Costacurta
CB	6	(Italy) Franco Baresi (c)
RM	7	(Italy) Carlo Ancelotti
CM	8	(Netherlands) Frank Rijkaard
CF	9	(Italy) Massimo Agostini
AM	10	(Netherlands) Ruud Gullit
LM	11	(Italy) Alberico Evani
Substitutes:
GK	12	(Italy) Sebastiano Rossi
DF	13	(Italy) Filippo Galli
MF	14	(Italy) Gianluca Gaudenzi
MF	15	(Italy) Giovanni Stroppa
MF	16	(Italy) Roberto Donadoni
Manager:
(Italy) Arrigo Sacchi

GK	1	(Italy) Gianluca Pagliuca
RB	2	(Italy) Marco Lanna
LB	3	(Italy) Ivano Bonetti
CM	4	(Italy) Fausto Pari
CB	5	(Italy) Pietro Vierchowod
CB	6	(Italy) Luca Pellegrini (c)
LM	7	(Soviet Union) Oleksiy Mykhaylychenko
CM	8	(Socialist Federal Republic of Yugoslavia) Srečko Katanec
CF	9	(Italy) Gianluca Vialli
CF	10	(Italy) Roberto Mancini
RM	11	(Italy) Attilio Lombardo
Substitutes:
GK	12	(Italy) Giulio Nuciari
MF	13	(Italy) Giuseppe Dossena
DF	14	(Italy) Giovanni Invernizzi
FW	15	(Italy) Umberto Calcagno
FW	16	(Italy) Marco Branca
Manager:
(Socialist Federal Republic of Yugoslavia) Vujadin Boškov

== See also ==
- AC Milan in international football
- Italian football clubs in international competitions
- UC Sampdoria in European football
- 1990–91 European Cup
- 1990–91 European Cup Winners' Cup
- 1990–91 AC Milan season
- 1990–91 UC Sampdoria season
