= Attilio Lombardo =

Italian footballer (born 1966)

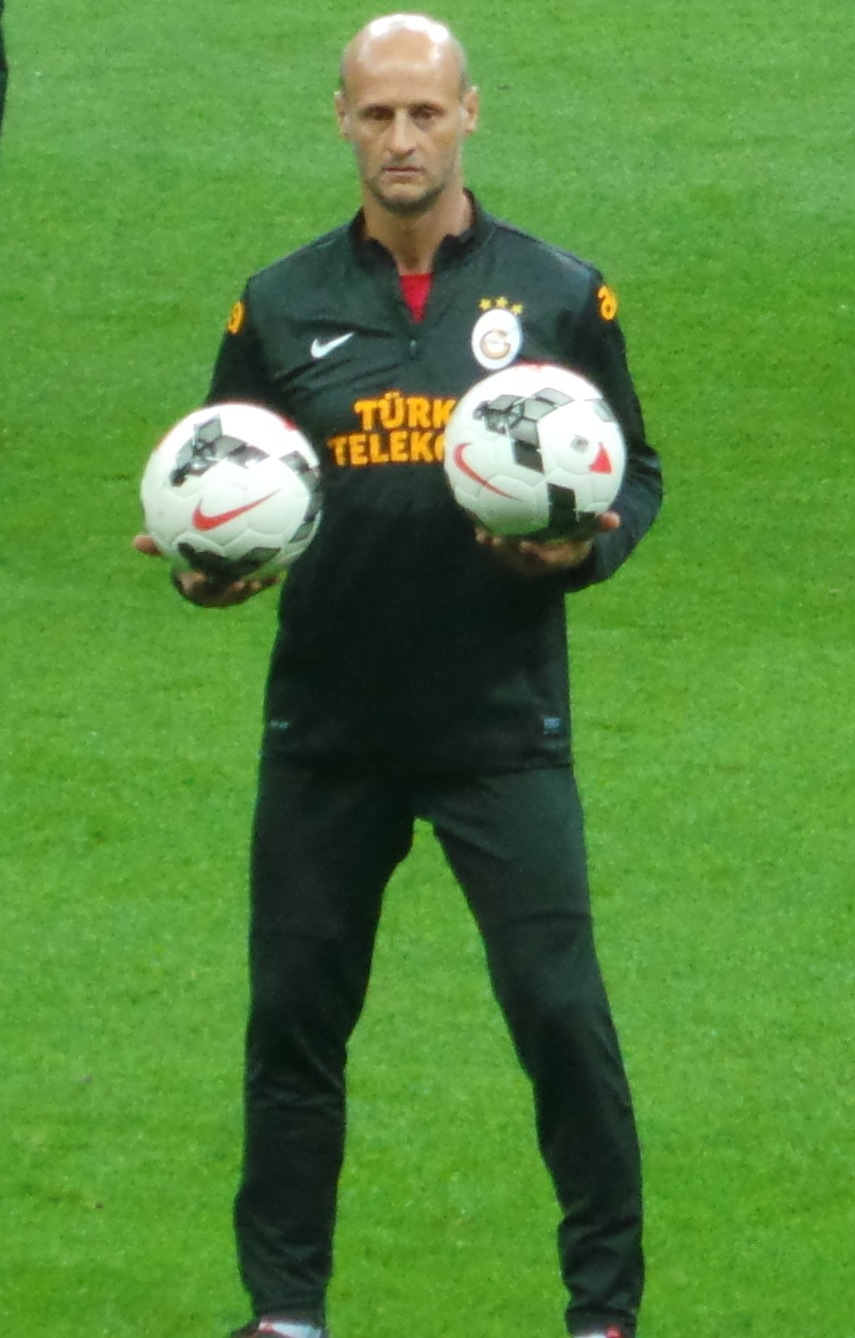
- Lombardo with Galatasaray in 2013

Personal information
- Full name: Attilio Lombardo
- Date of birth: 6 January 1966 (age 60)
- Place of birth: Santa Maria la Fossa, Italy
- Height: 1.75 m (5 ft 9 in)
- Positions: Right winger; right wing-back

Team information
- Current team: Sampdoria (caretaker/technical collaborator)

Youth career
- –1983: Pergocrema

Senior career*
Years	Team	Apps	(Gls)
1983–1985	Pergocrema	38	(9)
1985–1989	Cremonese	141	(17)
1989–1995	Sampdoria	201	(34)
1995–1997	Juventus	35	(2)
1997–1998	Crystal Palace	43	(8)
1999–2000	Lazio	33	(2)
2001–2002	Sampdoria	34	(1)
Total		525	(73)

International career
1990–1997	Italy	18	(3)

Managerial career
- 1998: Crystal Palace (caretaker)
- 2006–2007: Chiasso
- 2008: Castelnuovo
- 2008–2009: Legnano
- 2009: Spezia
- 2023: Italy U20
- 2026: Sampdoria (caretaker)
- * Club domestic league appearances and goals

Attilio Lombardo (Italian pronunciation: [atˈtiːljo lomˈbardo]; born 6 January 1966) is an Italian professional football manager and former player, currently working with Sampdoria as a technical collaborator.

Throughout his career he was usually deployed as a wide midfielder, or as an offensive right winger, although he also played as a fullback or wingback on occasion later in his career.

Lombardo played for several Italian clubs throughout his career, and is best known for his two spells with Sampdoria. He is one of the six players to have won the Serie A title with three different teams: Sampdoria, Juventus, and Lazio; the other five players to have managed the same feat are Giovanni Ferrari, Filippo Cavalli, Pietro Fanna, Sergio Gori, and Aldo Serena. Lombardo also had a spell in the Premier League with English side Crystal Palace. At international level, Lombardo represented the Italy national football team on 19 occasions, although he was never called up for a major tournament.

During his career, he was given the nicknames "Popeye", as he was thought to resemble the cartoon character's appearance due to his own bald head and strong physique, as well as "the Ostrich" (or "Struzzo", in Italian), because of his pace, stamina, and running style. He was also given the nickname "The Bald Eagle" during his time at Crystal Palace.

== Club career ==
=== Early career ===
Lombardo started his career at Pergocrema, having been promoted from the youth squad, in Italy's Serie C2, in 1983, only 16 years old, before moving up to the Serie B side Cremonese, in 1985, where he made a name for himself, as a more-than-capable right sided winger under the guidance of manager Tarcisio Burgnich.

=== Sampdoria ===
He was then sent to Serie A side Sampdoria for a total fee of 4 billion lira. Playing alongside talented players such as Gianluca Vialli, Roberto Mancini, Pietro Vierchowod, Gianluca Pagliuca, and Ruud Gullit, under manager Vujadin Boškov, Lombardo won several domestic and continental trophies with Sampdoria, such as Serie A, the Coppa Italia, the Italian Super Cup, and the Cup Winners' Cup. In the 1988–89 season, he picked up medals for the Coppa Italia in 1989, facing a rejuvenated Napoli side with legendary Argentine attacking midfielder Diego Maradona, only to defeat the Partenopei 4–0. In 1990, he lifted his side to victory in the Cup Winners' Cup, retaining impressive wins against Borussia Dortmund, Monaco and Anderlecht in the final.

The following season, Lombardo won the Supercoppa Italiana in 1991 against previous Serie A champions Roma, as well as the Serie A title. In fact, Lombardo also played for the Sampdoria side under Boškov that narrowly lost the 1992 European Cup final to Cruyff's Barcelona in extra time. He also enjoyed a successful season in 1993–94, where he scored 8 times in Serie A, and 5 in the Coppa Italia, enough to lead his team to a second Coppa Italia win in 1994, where he scored twice in the final.

=== Juventus ===
In 1995, Lombardo moved to defending Serie A champions Juventus under coach Marcello Lippi, joining former Sampdoria teammate Gianluca Vialli at the Turin-based club. Unfortunately, Lombardo suffered injuries during his two-year spell, but still picked up medals for Serie A, the UEFA Champions League, the Intercontinental Cup and the European Super Cup. In his first season with the Bianconeri, Lombardo scored only two league goals, playing sporadically in the first team and competing with players such as Antonio Conte and Didier Deschamps for a place in the lineup. Juventus, however, won the UEFA Champions League during the 1995–1996 season, regardless of having placed second in the domestic league, followed by the Intercontinental Cup. In Lombardo's second season with Juventus, he also won his second Serie A title and his first European Super Cup title, scoring a goal in the first leg against Paris Saint Germain, at the Parc des Princes. He also reached a second consecutive UEFA Champions League final with Juventus that season, only to lose out to Borussia Dortmund.

Nevertheless, he failed to score once in his second season; with only two goals in 35 appearances, and due to a string of poor performances, injuries, and inconsistency in Turin, he was released by the club, having been unable to return to the form he had experienced at Sampdoria during his time at Juventus. In total, he managed 51 appearances and four goals in all competitions during his time with Juventus.

=== Crystal Palace ===
In 1997, Lombardo was on the move again, joining newly-promoted Premiership club Crystal Palace. He instantly became the star player and scored on his debut at Everton. In early 1998, Mark Goldberg assumed control of the club, and manager Steve Coppell moved to the Director of Football post. Lombardo, along with Swedish international Tomas Brolin as an interpreter, was appointed as caretaker player-manager for the rest of the season.

Lombardo's season was curtailed by injury whilst with the Italy national squad in November (a recall came his way due to sparkling form with the Londoners). At the time of the injury, Palace were tenth in the table, but by the time he returned to the first team in April, they were bottom of the league. Palace were subsequently relegated to the First Division (now The Championship), despite Lombardo's return, which led to their only two home league wins of the season.

Lombardo decided to stay after Palace's relegation, as the club started poorly under the new manager Terry Venables. A severe financial crisis and a need to cut Palace's wage bill led Lombardo to leave in January 1999 to join Lazio under the management of Sven-Göran Eriksson. In 2005, Lombardo was voted into Palace's Centenary XI, despite having only made 49 appearances for the Eagles (far fewer than any of the other ten players, showing how highly Palace fans held The Bald Eagle).

=== Lazio, return to Sampdoria ===
At Lazio, he resumed his streak of domestic and European cup competition victories, gaining second medals for the Cup Winners Cup (1999), Serie A (2000), the Supercoppa Italiana (2000), the Coppa Italia (2000), and the European Super Cup (1999).

In January 2001, Lombardo left Lazio, to re-join Sampdoria, where he would finish his career and go into coaching at the youth level. Throughout his career, Lombardo was known for his resistance to injury, which enabled him to make 144 consecutive Serie A appearances.

== International career ==
During his career, Lombardo gained 18 caps for the Italy national side, between 1990 and 1997, scoring three goals, but injury and competition from other wide players, such as Donadoni, Di Livio, Pessotto and Moriero, meant he was rarely a regular member of the national side, and Italy never called him up for a major tournament.

== Style of play ==
Regarded during his career as one of Sampdoria's best-ever wingers, Lombardo was known for his pace, strength, stamina, and work-rate at both ends of the pitch, which allowed him to cover the right flank effectively. He was also noted for his professionalism and dedication, which contributed to a career with few serious injuries, and he was regarded as a consistent player and a key figure in the dressing room.

Although he was not particularly gifted with talent or technical ability, he nevertheless possessed good dribbling skills and control when running at speed, and he frequently utilised his acceleration, power and agility to beat opponents effectively in one-on-one situations. A tactically versatile and hard-working team player, he was also highly regarded for his creativity and accurate crossing ability as a winger, as well as his ability to start attacking plays and quick counter-attacks after his team won back the ball; furthermore, he was also known for his offensive contribution, composure, and eye for goal, although he also drew criticism at times for being wasteful in front of goal.

== Managerial career ==
Following his retirement from active football, he remained at Sampdoria until June 2006 as the youth team manager. In the next two years, however, the Primavera squad would achieve reasonable success in the Campionato Nazionale Primavera. In 2006, he was appointed manager of Swiss side Chiasso in the Swiss Challenge League. He resigned in May 2007, citing a lack of motivation. The team was relegated to the third tier of Swiss Football the following season.

In April 2008, he was appointed at the helm of Tuscan Serie C2 club Castelnuovo. He stayed at the club for the remainder of the season, leading the small Tuscan club to escape relegation through the playoffs. Lombardo then moved to Lega Pro Prima Divisione club Legnano for the entire 2008–09 season, and was unable to save his side from relegation to Lega Pro Seconda Divisione, the fourth level of Italian Football.

Lombardo was appointed in July 2009 as the new head coach of Spezia in the Lega Pro Seconda Divisione, but unexpectedly resigned in October, despite his team having attained third place in the league table. Eventually, at the end of the season, Spezia would automatically garner promotion to Serie C1 as runners-up to the title.

In July 2010, Lombardo joined the coaching staff at Manchester City, linking up again with compatriot Roberto Mancini. In 2012, following the departure of Andy Welsh, he was appointed manager of the club's reserve squad; however, after the sacking of Roberto Mancini on 13 May 2013, Lombardo resigned from his position at Manchester City on Wednesday 15 May.

On 30 September 2013, he rejoined Roberto Mancini at Galatasaray, working again as assistant coach. On 7 October 2014, Lombardo became the assistant coach of Schalke 04.

On 21 May 2016, Lombardo became the assistant coach at Torino for head coach Siniša Mihajlović. Mihajlović was sacked on 4 January 2018, along with Lombardo and the rest of his staff.

On 13 March 2019, Lombardo became the assistant coach for the Italy national team, alongside head coach Roberto Mancini.

In 2025, he returned to Sampdoria, joining the coaching staff led by Alberico Evani who guided the Blucerchiati in the final part of the 2024–25 Serie B season.

On 2 November 2025, he was rehired by Sampdoria as a technical collaborator under new head coach Angelo Gregucci. On 9 March 2026, following a 0–3 loss to Frosinone that led to the dismissal of Gregucci and his assistant Salvatore Foti, Lombardo was appointed temporarily in charge of the first team.

== Personal life ==
His son Mattia followed in his footsteps, being a product of Sampdoria's youth section.

== Career statistics ==
=== Club ===
Appearances and goals by club, season and competition
Club	Season	League			National cup		League cup		Continental		Other		Total	
Club	Season	Division	Apps	Goals	Apps	Goals	Apps	Goals	Apps	Goals	Apps	Goals	Apps	Goals
Pergocrema	1983–84	Serie C2	7	2	?	?	–		–		–		7	2
Pergocrema	1984–85	Serie C2	31	7	?	?	–		–		–		31	7
Pergocrema	Total		38	9	?	?	–		–		–		38	9
Cremonese	1985–86	Serie B	31	4	5	0	–		–		–		36	4
Cremonese	1986–87	Serie B	36	3	10	1	–		–		2 (Note: Appearances in Serie B – Promotion play-offs)	0	48	4
Cremonese	1987–88	Serie B	37	5	5	2	–		–		–		42	7
Cremonese	1988–89	Serie B	37	5	5	1	–		–		–		42	6
Cremonese	Total		141	17	25	4	–		–		2	0	168	21
Sampdoria	1989–90	Serie A	34	7	4	0	–		8 (Note: Appearance(s) in UEFA Cup Winners' Cup)	2	1 (Note: Appearance in Supercoppa Italiana)	0	47	9
Sampdoria	1990–91	Serie A	32	3	8	1	–		6	1	2 (Note: Appearances in UEFA Super Cup)	0	48	5
Sampdoria	1991–92	Serie A	34	4	6	0	–		10 (Note: Appearances in UEFA Champions League ("European Cup" until 1992))	4	1	0	51	8
Sampdoria	1992–93	Serie A	34	6	2	0	–		–		–		36	6
Sampdoria	1993–94	Serie A	34	8	10	5	–		–		–		44	13
Sampdoria	1994–95	Serie A	33	6	4	2	–		8	2	1	0	46	10
Sampdoria	Total		201	34	34	8	–		32	9	5	0	272	51
Juventus	1995–96	Serie A	13	2	0	0	–		4	0	–		17	2
Juventus	1996–97	Serie A	22	0	4	0	–		6	1	2	1	34	2
Juventus	Total		35	2	4	0	–		10	1	2	1	51	4
Crystal Palace	1997–98	Premier League	24	5	0	0	0	0	–		–		24	5
Crystal Palace	1998–99	Football League First Division	19	3	–		4	2	1 (Note: Appearances in UEFA Intertoto Cup)	0	–		24	5
Crystal Palace	Total		43	8	0	0	4	2	1	0	–		47	10
Lazio	1998–99	Serie A	14	1	1	1	–		5	0	–		19	2
Lazio	1999–2000	Serie A	10	1	6	0	–		5	0	1	0	22	1
Lazio	2000–01	Serie A	9	0	4	2	–		7	0	1	0	21	2
Lazio	Total		33	2	11	3	–		17	0	2	0	63	5
Sampdoria	2000–01	Serie B	17	1	–		–		–		–		17	1
Sampdoria	2001–02	Serie B	17	0	2	0	–		–		–		19	0
Sampdoria	Total		34	1	2	0	–		–		–		36	1
Career total			525	73	76	15	4	2	60	10	11	1	676	101

=== International ===
Appearances and goals by national team and year
National team	Year	Apps	Goals
Italy	1990	1	1
Italy	1991	4	0
Italy	1992	3	0
Italy	1993	1	0
Italy	1994	2	1
Italy	1995	4	1
Italy	1996	0	0
Italy	1997	3	0
Total		18	3

Scores and results list Italy's goal tally first, score column indicates score after each Lombardo goal.

List of international goals scored by Attilio Lombardo
No.	Date	Venue	Opponent	Score	Result	Competition
1	22 December 1990	Tsirio Stadium, Limassol, Cyprus	Cyprus	3–0	4–0	UEFA Euro 1992 qualifying
2	21 December 1994	Stadio Adriatico, Pescara, Italy	Turkey	2–0	3–1	Friendly
3	29 March 1995	Republican Stadium, Kyiv, Ukraine	Ukraine	1–0	2–0	UEFA Euro 1996 qualifying

== Honours ==
=== Player ===
Sampdoria

- Serie A: 1990–91
- Coppa Italia: 1993–94
- Supercoppa Italiana: 1991
- UEFA Cup Winners' Cup: 1989–90
- European Cup runner-up: 1991–92
- European Super Cup runner-up: 1990

Juventus

- Serie A: 1996–97
- Supercoppa Italiana: 1995
- UEFA Champions League: 1995–96
- UEFA Super Cup: 1996
- Intercontinental Cup: 1996

Lazio

- Serie A: 1999–2000
- Coppa Italia: 1999–2000
- Supercoppa Italiana: 2000
- UEFA Cup Winners' Cup: 1998–99
- UEFA Super Cup: 1999

Individual

- Coppa Italia top scorer: 1993–94 (5 goals)
