= Gianluca Gaudenzi =

Italian footballer and coach

Personal information
- Date of birth: 28 December 1965 (age 60)
- Place of birth: Riccione, Italy
- Height: 1.81 m (5 ft 11 in)
- Position: Midfielder

Senior career*
Years	Team	Apps	(Gls)
1982–1983	Rimini	26	(5)
1983–1984	Brescia	23	(3)
1984–1985	Ancona	18	(1)
1985–1986	Livorno	18	(1)
1986–1988	Pescara	50	(3)
1988–1989	Monza	28	(1)
1989–1990	Verona	29	(2)
1990–1991	A.C. Milan	12	(0)
1991–1993	Cagliari	30	(2)
1993–1995	Pescara	41	(2)
1995–1996	Lucchese	11	(0)
1996–1997	Modena	34	(1)
1998–1999	Cesena	17	(0)

Managerial career
- 2001–2002: Fano
- 2002–2005: Ivrea
- 2005–2007: Carpenedolo
- 2007–2008: Pro Vercelli
- 2008–2009: Pescara
- 2010–2011: Pro Patria
- 2011–2012: Fano
- * Club domestic league appearances and goals

Gianluca Gaudenzi (born 28 December 1965) is an Italian professional football coach and a former player, who played as a midfielder.

== Career ==
Gaudenzi was born in Riccione. After playing for plethora Italian clubs in the lower divisions, he made his Serie A debut with Verona in 1989, and later moved to A.C. Milan in 1990, where he won the UEFA Super Cup and the Intercontinental Cup during his only season with the club, under manager Arrigo Sacchi. He transferred to Serie A side Cagliari in 1991, where he remained until 1993. He subsequently played for several more Italian clubs in the lower divisions, until his retirement in 1999.

He began his coaching career with Serie D side Fano in 2001, but as of 2011, has remained inactive after being fired from Fano during the 2011–12 Lega Pro season.

== Honours ==
=== Player ===
AC Milan

- UEFA Super Cup winner: 1990.
- Intercontinental Cup winner: 1990.
