= Srečko Katanec =

Slovenian footballer and manager (born 1963)

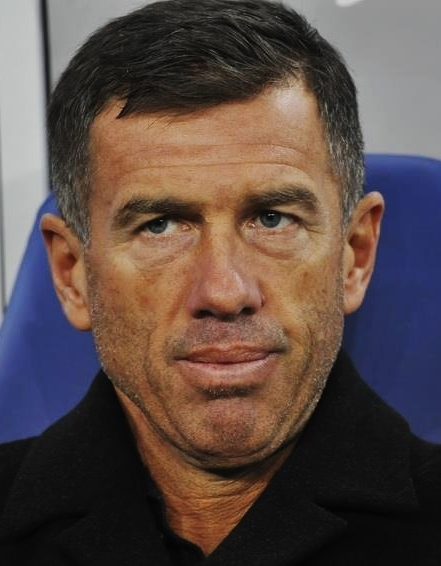
- Katanec in 2015

Personal information
- Date of birth: 16 July 1963 (age 63)
- Place of birth: Ljubljana, SR Slovenia, Yugoslavia
- Height: 1.90 m (6 ft 3 in)
- Positions: Defensive midfielder; centre-back

Youth career
- 1970–1981: Ljubljana

Senior career*
| Years | Team | Apps | (Gls) |
| 1981–1985 | Olimpija | 81 | (10) |
| 1985–1986 | Dinamo Zagreb | 21 | (3) |
| 1986–1988 | Partizan | 58 | (9) |
| 1988–1989 | VfB Stuttgart | 26 | (1) |
| 1989–1994 | Sampdoria | 87 | (12) |
| Total | | 273 | (35) |

International career
- Yugoslavia U21
| 1983–1990 | Yugoslavia | 31 | (5) |
| 1994 | Slovenia | 5 | (1) |

Managerial career
- 1997–1998: Gorica
- 1998–2002: Slovenia
- 2002–2003: Olympiacos
- 2006–2009: Macedonia
- 2009–2011: United Arab Emirates
- 2013–2017: Slovenia
- 2018–2021: Iraq
- 2021–2025: Uzbekistan
Medal record
Representing Yugoslavia
Men's football
Olympic Games
| Bronze medal – third place | 1984 Los Angeles | Team |
- * Club domestic league appearances and goals

Srečko Katanec (pronounced [ˈsretʃkɔ kaˈtanɛts]; born 16 July 1963) is a Slovenian retired football manager and player. At international level, he was capped for both the Yugoslavia and Slovenia national teams.

A former midfielder, who was also capable of playing as a defender, Katanec is regarded as one of the greatest Slovenian footballers of all time, having represented Yugoslavia at the 1984 and 1988 Summer Olympics, UEFA Euro 1984 and the 1990 FIFA World Cup. After Slovenia's independence, Katanec made five appearances for the newly formed Slovenia national team before retiring from professional football.

During his club career, Katanec won a Yugoslav League championship with FK Partizan and was a runner-up of the 1988–89 UEFA Cup with VfB Stuttgart. In his five-year spell with Sampdoria, he won the Serie A championship, the Coppa Italia and the European Cup Winners' Cup, as well as finishing as a runner-up in the 1992 European Cup final, losing to Barcelona.

As manager of Slovenia, Katanec led the country to its first major tournament in history after qualifying for the 2000 European Championship and the 2002 FIFA World Cup.

== Playing career ==
=== Club ===
Katanec began playing football at the age of seven with NK Ljubljana. In 1981, he joined Olimpija; in 1985, he joined Dinamo Zagreb; while the next year, he signed with Partizan and was a Yugoslav champion in 1987.

In 1988, Katanec joined VfB Stuttgart in the German Bundesliga. The club reached the 1989 UEFA Cup final, but lost to Diego Maradona's Napoli. Katanec played just one season for Stuttgart. In 1989, he signed for Italian Serie A side Sampdoria, where he won the European Cup Winners' Cup in his first season. In 1991, Sampdoria won the Scudetto as Serie A champions, while the next year, the club reached the 1992 European Cup final, losing to Barcelona. In 1994, he also won the Coppa Italia with Sampdoria under manager Sven-Göran Eriksson.

=== International ===
Katanec was a member of the Yugoslavia national team for the 1984 European Championship in France, but he has fonder memories of the 1984 Olympics in Los Angeles, where Yugoslavia team won a bronze medal. He was playing successfully in the qualifying round for 1990 FIFA World Cup in Italy so he became the third Slovenian to play at a World Cup, where he appeared in three of Yugoslavia's five matches. These would be his last three caps for Yugoslavia. Altogether, he appeared in 31 matches and scored 5 goals.

Katanec played five more matches (and scored a goal) for the independent Slovenia national team, but appeared in only one official match. That was a qualifying round for the 1996 European Championship, on 7 September 1994 in Maribor against Italy. Soon after, his contract with Sampdoria expired and he retired from professional football.

== Managerial career ==
Between 1996 and 1997, Katanec was an assistant manager of Drago Kostanjšek at the Slovenia under-21 team. In December 1997, he became a head coach of Gorica, signing a two-and-a-half-year contract. In July 1998, he was announced as the Slovenian national team manager.

With Slovenia, he qualified for the 2000 UEFA European Championship after eliminating Ukraine in the qualifying play-offs, which was the country's first-ever appearance at the major tournament. At the tournament, Slovenia earned draws against FR Yugoslavia and Norway, and lost to Spain. Slovenia also managed to qualify for the 2002 FIFA World Cup, where they lost all three matches against Spain, South Africa and Paraguay. After the first game, Katanec had a huge argument with the team's star player Zlatko Zahovič, who was sent home. He resigned immediately after the World Cup. On 2 November 2002, he became the new manager of Olympiacos. Under Katanec's command, Olympiacos played worse than expected, and on 7 February 2003 the club terminated his contract with immediate effect due to poor performances and a bad atmosphere in the team.

In 2004, Katanec was a candidate to become the national team manager of Croatia; however, Zlatko Kranjčar was chosen instead of him.

On 17 February 2006, Katanec was appointed as Macedonia's head coach for the UEFA Euro 2008 qualifiers. Following a mixed set of results in the qualifying campaign for the 2010 FIFA World Cup, including a 1–0 win against Scotland and a 4–0 loss to the Netherlands, Katanec resigned from the position on 6 April 2009. On 23 June 2009, he was presented as a new head coach of the United Arab Emirates national team. He was sacked on 6 September 2011 after two successive defeats in the third round of qualifiers for the 2014 FIFA World Cup.

On 31 December 2012, he accepted the offer from the Football Association of Slovenia to become the manager of Slovenia for the second time, and was officially appointed on 4 January 2013. He resigned in October 2017 after failing to qualify for the 2018 FIFA World Cup.

On 4 September 2018, Katanec was appointed as head coach of the Iraq on a three-year contract. His first major competition was the 2019 AFC Asian Cup, where he managed to achieve what he had failed with Slovenia and the United Arab Emirates, by reaching the knockout stages in a major tournament for the first time, as his Iraq reached the round of 16 before losing to the eventual champions Qatar 1–0. Under his management, Iraq also achieved a notable 2–1 win over neighbour Iran in the 2022 World Cup qualifiers, as well as guiding Iraq to the final of the WAFF Championship and to the third round of World Cup qualifiers, but due to conflict with the federation over unpaid salaries, Katanec departed as coach in July 2021.

On 27 August 2021, Katanec was appointed as head coach of Uzbekistan on a four-year contract. With Uzbekistan, he reached the quarter-finals of the 2023 AFC Asian Cup, where the team was eliminated on penalties by eventual champions Qatar. Katanec resigned as Uzbekistan head coach in January 2025 due to health problems, and announced his retirement from football.

== Personal life ==
Katanec was born in Ljubljana to Croat parents from Međimurje. He has two sons, Svit Oliver and Ian Oskar.

== Career statistics ==
=== Club ===
Appearances and goals by club, season and competition
| Club | Season | League | | | National cup | | Continental | | Other | | Total | |
| Club | Season | Division | Apps | Goals | Apps | Goals | Apps | Goals | Apps | Goals | Apps | Goals |
|---|---|---|---|---|---|---|---|---|---|---|---|---|
| Olimpija Ljubljana | 1980–81 | Yugoslav First League | 2 | 0 | | | | | | | 2 | 0 |
| Olimpija Ljubljana | 1981–82 | Yugoslav First League | 17 | 0 | | | | | | | 17 | 0 |
| Olimpija Ljubljana | 1982–83 | Yugoslav First League | 29 | 4 | | | | | | | 29 | 4 |
| Olimpija Ljubljana | 1983–84 | Yugoslav First League | 33 | 6 | | | | | | | 33 | 6 |
| Olimpija Ljubljana | Total | | 81 | 10 | | | | | | | 81 | 10 |
| Dinamo Zagreb | 1985–86 | Yugoslav First League | 21 | 3 | | | | | | | 21 | 3 |
| Partizan | 1986–87 | Yugoslav First League | 30 | 3 | 1 | 0 | 2 | 0 | — | | 33 | 3 |
| Partizan | 1987–88 | Yugoslav First League | 28 | 6 | 1 | 0 | 2 | 0 | — | | 31 | 6 |
| Partizan | Total | | 58 | 9 | 2 | 0 | 4 | 0 | — | | 64 | 9 |
| VfB Stuttgart | 1988–89 | Bundesliga | 26 | 1 | 4 | 2 | 11 | 0 | — | | 41 | 3 |
| Sampdoria | 1989–90 | Serie A | 27 | 5 | 3 | 1 | 8 | 1 | 1 | 0 | 39 | 7 |
| Sampdoria | 1990–91 | Serie A | 26 | 2 | 6 | 1 | 5 | 1 | 1 | 0 | 38 | 4 |
| Sampdoria | 1991–92 | Serie A | 26 | 4 | 4 | 0 | 10 | 1 | 1 | 0 | 41 | 5 |
| Sampdoria | 1992–93 | Serie A | 4 | 0 | 0 | 0 | — | | — | | 4 | 0 |
| Sampdoria | 1993–94 | Serie A | 4 | 1 | 3 | 0 | — | | — | | 7 | 1 |
| Sampdoria | Total | | 87 | 12 | 16 | 2 | 23 | 3 | 3 | 0 | 129 | 17 |
| Career total | | | 273 | 35 | 22 | 4 | 38 | 3 | 3 | 0 | 336 | 42 |

=== Managerial ===
As of match played 19 November 2024

Managerial record by team and tenure
| Team | From | To | Record | | | | | Ref. |
| Team | From | To | P | W | D | L | Win % | Ref. |
|---|---|---|---|---|---|---|---|---|
| Gorica | 18 December 1997 | 2 July 1998 | 18 | 12 | 1 | 5 | 66.7 | |
| Slovenia | 2 July 1998 | 18 June 2002 | 47 | 18 | 16 | 13 | 38.3 | |
| Olympiacos | 2 November 2002 | 7 February 2003 | 14 | 8 | 5 | 1 | 57.1 | |
| Macedonia | 17 February 2006 | 6 April 2009 | 27 | 9 | 7 | 11 | 33.3 | |
| United Arab Emirates | 23 June 2009 | 6 September 2011 | 28 | 11 | 8 | 9 | 39.3 | |
| Slovenia | 4 January 2013 | 24 December 2017 | 42 | 16 | 7 | 19 | 38.1 | |
| Iraq | 4 September 2018 | July 2021 | 38 | 20 | 13 | 5 | 52.6 | |
| Uzbekistan | 27 August 2021 | 22 January 2025 | 43 | 27 | 9 | 7 | 62.8 | |
| Total | | | 257 | 121 | 66 | 70 | 47.1 | — |

== Honours ==
Partizan

- Yugoslav First League: 1986–87

VfB Stuttgart

- UEFA Cup runner-up: 1988–89

Sampdoria

- Serie A: 1990–91
- Coppa Italia: 1993–94
- Supercoppa Italiana: 1991
- European Cup Winners' Cup: 1989–90
- European Cup runner-up: 1991–92
