= Umberto Calcagno =

Italian former professional footballer

Personal information
- Date of birth: 6 September 1970 (age 56)
- Place of birth: Chiavari, Italy
- Height: 1.77 m (5 ft 9 1/2 in)
- Position: Midfielder

Senior career*
Years	Team	Apps	(Gls)
1989–1990	Trani	26	(1)
1990–1991	Sampdoria	2	(0)
1991–1992	Baracca Lugo	22	(3)
1992–1994	Trani	51	(15)
1994–1995	Barletta	27	(4)
1995–1996	Castrovillari	32	(10)
1996–1997	Albanova	22	(0)
1997–1999	Guilianova	55	(6)
1999–2000	Rimini	32	(14)
2000–2001	Benevento	18	(0)
2001	Avellino	7	(0)
2001–2002	Martina	17	(3)
2002–2005	Gualdo	61	(0)
2005	Paganese	12	(3)
- * Club domestic league appearances and goals

Umberto Calcagno (born 6 September 1970 in Chiavari) is an Italian former professional footballer who played as a midfielder. He played in Serie A for Sampdoria.

== Honours ==
Sampdoria

- Serie A champion: 1990–91
