= Giuseppe Dossena =

Italian footballer and manager

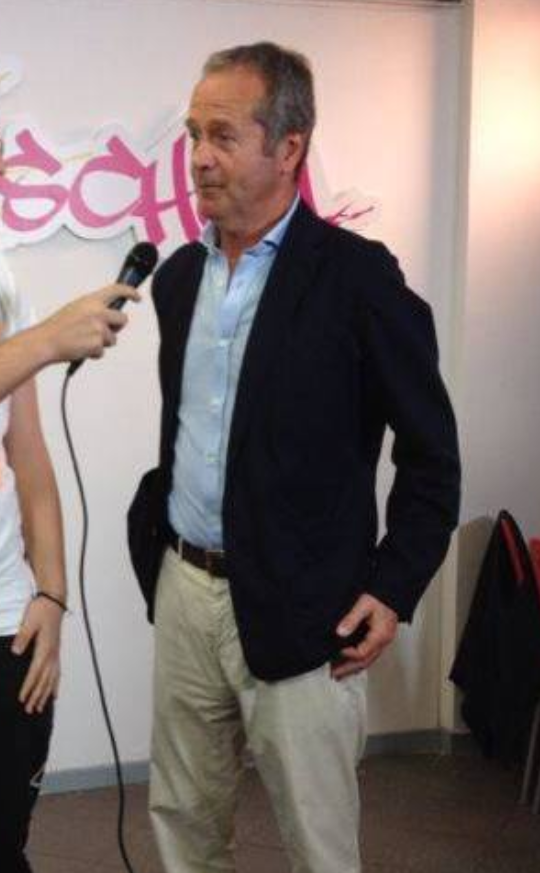

Personal information
- Date of birth: 2 May 1958 (age 68)
- Place of birth: Milan, Italy
- Height: 1.79 m (5 ft 10 1/2 in)
- Position: Midfielder

Youth career
- Alcione
- Torino

Senior career*
Years	Team	Apps	(Gls)
1976–1977	Torino	0	(0)
1977–1978	Pistoiese	28	(1)
1978–1979	Cesena	28	(0)
1979–1981	Bologna	57	(7)
1981–1987	Torino	187	(20)
1987–1988	Udinese	28	(6)
1988–1991	Sampdoria	102	(9)
1991–1992	Perugia	26	(3)
Total		456	(46)

International career^{‡}
1983–1984	Italy U21	4	(0)
1981–1987	Italy	38	(1)

Managerial career
- 1998: Triestina (assistant coach)
- 1998–1999: Ghana U20
- 1998–2000: Ghana
- 2000–2001: Ittihad Jeddah
- 2001–2002: Paraguay (assistant coach)
- 2002: Albania
- 2002–2003: Al-Ittihad
- 2003–2004: Lodigiani
- 2010–2012: Saint George FC
Medal record
Representing Italy
FIFA World Cup
Winner	1982 Spain
- * Club domestic league appearances and goals as of 29 June 2006 ‡ National team caps and goals as of 31 April 2015

Giuseppe Dossena (Italian pronunciation: [dʒuˈzɛppe dosˈseːna]; born 2 May 1958) is an Italian football manager and former football player, who played as a midfielder. He played for several Italian clubs throughout his career, in particular Torino and Sampdoria, where he won several titles. At international level, he represented the Italy national football team, and was a member of the Italian squad that won the 1982 FIFA World Cup.

== Club career ==
Dossena began his playing career for Torino in 1976, and moved to Pistoiese the following season. He subsequently played for Cesena and Bologna, before returning to Torino in 1981, where he remained until 1987; it was during this second spell with the club that he was a member of the Italy national team, even earning a call-up for the Italy squad at the 1982 FIFA World Cup. He then played for Udinese, Sampdoria and Perugia, where he retired in 1992. Dossena is mostly remembered for his time with Sampdoria, where he achieved notable domestic and international success, winning the 1988–89 Coppa Italia, the 1989–90 European Cup Winners' Cup, the 1990–91 Serie A title, and the 1991 Supercoppa Italiana, also losing out on the 1990 European Super Cup final to European Cup winners and Serie A rivals Milan.

== International career ==
With the Italy national side, Dossena received 38 caps between 1981 and 1987, scoring 1 goal. After making 4 appearances in Italy's 1982 FIFA World Cup qualifiers, he was selected as a member of Italy's 1982 FIFA World Cup winning squad, although he was an unused substitute throughout the tournament, despite being given the number 10 shirt.

== Style of play ==
Primarily a playmaker, Dossena was a hard-working, creative team player, renowned for his stamina, vision, technique, and passing ability in midfield, although he was also known for his ability to make attacking runs and strike from distance.

== Managerial career ==
Later, he started a managing career at international level, coaching Ghana for two years (1998–2000), and then being assistant of Cesare Maldini in Paraguay's appearance at the 2002 FIFA World Cup. Between 2000 and 2001, he coached Ittihad Jeddah of Saudi Arabia. He later worked as an analyst for Italian public broadcasting company RAI.

In July 2002, Dossena was appointed the new manager of Albania national team, becoming the first foreigner manager of the team since Hungarian Miklós Vadas in 1953. His spell at The Red and Blacks lasted for only three months, during which he led the national team in only two matches: the first was a 1–1 draw against Switzerland and the second was the 4–1 loss to Russia. He also won an unofficial friendly match against Kosovo 1–0 in September. In November 2002, he asked for his resign via a letter directed to Albanian Football Association, citing the pressure from the local media as the main reason of his decision.

On 30 August 2010 it was revealed that Dossena had agreed a two-year contract with Ethiopian champions Saint George FC. He later worked as a sporting director. Now, he is an adviser for the Italy national football team.

== Career statistics ==
=== International ===
Appearances and goals by national team and year
National team	Year	Apps	Goals
Italy	1981	6	1
Italy	1982	5	0
Italy	1983	6	0
Italy	1984	9	0
Italy	1985	3	0
Italy	1986	3	0
Italy	1987	6	0
Total		38	1

== Honours ==
=== Club ===
Sampdoria

- Serie A: 1990–91
- Coppa Italia: 1988–89
- Supercoppa Italiana: 1991
- European Cup Winners' Cup: 1989–90

=== International ===
Italy

- FIFA World Cup: 1982
