= Mauro Bertarelli =

Italian footballer (born 1970)

Personal information
- Date of birth: 15 September 1970 (age 56)
- Place of birth: Arezzo
- Height: 1.76 m (5 ft 9 in)
- Position: Forward

Senior career*
Years	Team	Apps	(Gls)
1987–1988	Jesina		
1988–1992	Ancona		
1989–1990	→ Rimini (loan)		
1992–1996	Sampdoria		
1996–1997	Empoli		
1997–2002	Ravenna		

International career
- Italy under-21
- Italy under-23
- * Club domestic league appearances and goals

Mauro Bertarelli (born 15 September 1970) is a retired Italian football striker. He represented Italy's U-21 and U-23 sides at the 1992 UEFA European Under-21 Championship and the 1993 Mediterranean Games.
