= Stefano Sacchetti =

Italian footballer

Personal information
- Date of birth: 10 August 1972 (age 54)
- Place of birth: Modena, Italy
- Height: 1.80 m (5 ft 11 in)
- Position: Defender

Senior career*
Years	Team	Apps	(Gls)
1991–1992	Modena		
1992–1997	Sampdoria	102	(1)
1997–2002	Piacenza	72	(0)
2002–2005	Sampdoria	32	(1)
2005–2009	Mantova		
2009–2011	Virtus Castelfranco		
- * Club domestic league appearances and goals

Stefano Sacchetti (born 10 August 1972) is a retired Italian football defender.
