= Giovanni Invernizzi (footballer, born 1963) =

Italian footballer

Personal information
- Date of birth: 22 August 1963 (age 63)
- Place of birth: Como, Italy
- Height: 1.75 m (5 ft 9 in)
- Position: Midfielder

Team information
- Current team: Sampdoria (head of youth development)

Youth career
- –1981: Como

Senior career*
Years	Team	Apps	(Gls)
1981–1989	Como	107	(3)
1982–1984	→ Reggina (loan)	47	(0)
1989–1997	Sampdoria	182	(3)
Total		336	(6)

Managerial career
- 1997–2001: Sampdoria U17
- 2003–2005: Sampdoria U19
- 2005–2009: Bogliasco (head of youth development)
- 2009–2012: Bogliasco
- 2012–2017: Sampdoria (head of youth development)
- 2015: Sampdoria U19
- 2018–2020: Sampdoria (head of youth development)
- 2020–2021: Spezia (head of youth development)
- 2021–: Sampdoria (head of youth development)
- * Club domestic league appearances and goals

Giovanni Invernizzi (born 22 August 1963) is an Italian professional football coach and former player who played as a midfielder, currently head of youth development at Serie B club Sampdoria.

He made nearly 300 appearances in Serie A in the 1980s and 1990s.

He was manager of Sampdoria's youth teams and of Bogliasco.

== Honours ==
=== Player ===
Reggina

- Serie C2 – Group D: 1983–84

Sampdoria

- Serie A: 1990–91
- Coppa Italia: 1993–94
- Supercoppa Italiana: 1991
- European Cup runner-up: 1991–92
- European Super Cup runner-up: 1990
- European Cup Winners' Cup: 1989–90

=== Coach ===
Bogliasco

- Eccellenza Liguria: 2010–11
- Coppa Italia Liguria: 2010–11
