= Giovanni Dall'Igna =

Italian footballer

Personal information
- Date of birth: 16 August 1972 (age 54)
- Place of birth: Malo, Italy
- Height: 1.82 m (5 ft 11 1/2 in)
- Position: Defender

Senior career*
Years	Team	Apps	(Gls)
1989–1991	Sampdoria	0	(0)
1991–1992	Baracca Lugo	27	(0)
1992–1993	SPAL	20	(1)
1993–1994	Sampdoria	11	(0)
1994–1997	Cremonese	79	(1)
1997–1998	Bologna	3	(0)
1998–2001	Ravenna	88	(0)
2001–2003	Spezia	39	(0)
2003–2006	Cremonese	76	(0)
2006	Varese	3	(0)
2006–2007	Tritium	22	(0)
2007–2008	Castellana		
- * Club domestic league appearances and goals

Giovanni Dall'Igna (born 16 August 1972 in Malo) is a retired Italian professional footballer who played as a defender.

== Honours ==
Sampdoria

- Serie A champion: 1990–91.
- Coppa Italia winner: 1993–94.
