= Marco Lanna =

Italian footballer (born 1968)

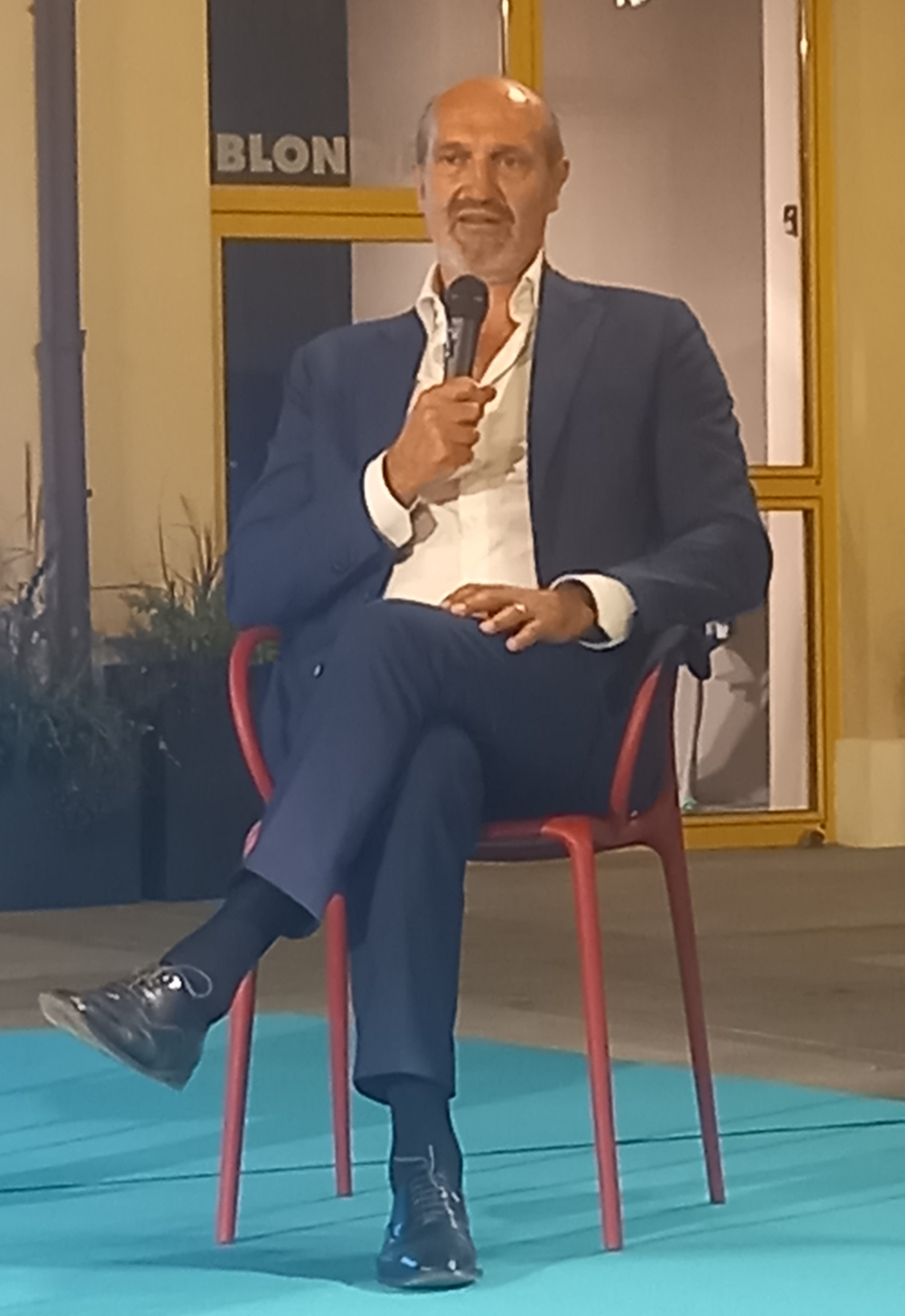
- Lanna in 2023.

Personal information
- Date of birth: 13 July 1968 (age 58)
- Place of birth: Genoa, Italy
- Position: Defender

Senior career*
Years	Team	Apps	(Gls)
1987–1993	Sampdoria	124	(2)
1993–1997	Roma	113	(2)
1997–1999	Salamanca	60	(2)
1999–2001	Real Zaragoza	27	(2)
2001–2002	Sampdoria	9	(0)
Total		333	(8)

International career
1989	Italy B	1	(0)
1992–1993	Italy	2	(0)
- * Club domestic league appearances and goals

Marco Lanna (Italian pronunciation: [ˈmarko ˈlanna]; born 13 July 1968) is an Italian former professional footballer who played at both club and international levels as a defender.

== Playing career ==
Born in Genoa, Lanna began his career with Sampdoria, moving to Roma with a four-year agreement for 800 million lire per year. He left the club at the end of his contract and joined Spanish club Salamanca as free agent, and, after two further years, he moved to Real Zaragoza.

He earned two caps for Italy between 1992 and 1993, including in one FIFA World Cup qualifier.

== Later career ==
In August 2011 Lanna was appointed director of football of Piacenza. He left the club in January 2012.

On 27 December 2021, he was named new chairman of Sampdoria following the resignation of Massimo Ferrero. He resigned on 3 February 2024.
