= Gianluca Pagliuca =

Italian footballer

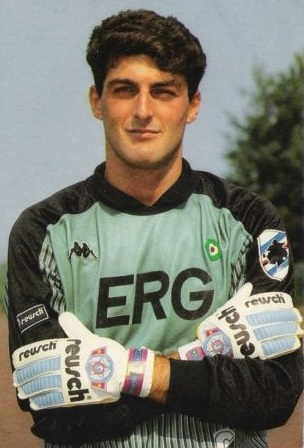
- Pagliuca with Sampdoria in 1989

Personal information
- Full name: Gianluca Pagliuca
- Date of birth: 18 December 1966 (age 59)
- Place of birth: Bologna, Italy
- Height: 1.90 m (6 ft 3 in)
- Position: Goalkeeper

Youth career
- 1984–1986: Bologna

Senior career*
Years	Team	Apps	(Gls)
1987–1994	Sampdoria	198	(0)
1994–1999	Inter Milan	165	(0)
1999–2006	Bologna	248	(0)
2006–2007	Ascoli	23	(0)
Total		634	(0)

International career
1989	Italy U21	1	(0)
1996	Italy Olympic (O.P.)	3	(0)
1990–1998	Italy	39	(0)
Medal record
Men's Football
Representing Italy
FIFA World Cup
Runner-up	1994 USA
Third place	1990 Italy
- * Club domestic league appearances and goals

Gianluca Pagliuca Cavaliere OMRI (Italian pronunciation: [dʒanˈluːka paʎˈʎuːka]; born 18 December 1966) is an Italian football coach and former professional goalkeeper.

He is regarded by pundits as one of the greatest goalkeepers of his generation, and one of Italy's best keepers ever. Throughout his career, he played for Sampdoria, Inter, Bologna, and Ascoli in Italy, winning several domestic and international trophies. At international level, he represented Italy at three FIFA World Cups (1990, 1994, and 1998), most notably reaching the 1994 World Cup final as Italy's starting goalkeeper.

He is the player with the fifth most appearances (592), and the second best penalty-stopper (24 saves) in Serie A behind Samir Handanović, although other specialists such as Júlio César and Handanović have a higher success rate.

== Club career ==
Pagliuca was born in Bologna. In his club career, he played for Sampdoria (1987–94), Internazionale (1994–99), Bologna (1999–2006), and Ascoli (2006–07). His most notable successes with Sampdoria include one Cup Winners' Cup and one Scudetto; he also reached a UEFA Champions League final, losing 1–0 to Barcelona in 1992, at Wembley, in spite of his impressive performance.

In 1994, he moved from Sampdoria to Internazionale from a then world record fee for a goalkeeper of £7 million. With the nerazzurri he reached two consecutive UEFA Cup finals, losing the first one against Schalke 04 in 1997 and winning the second one in 1998, when he captained the side to a 3–0 win over Lazio. Pagliuca left Inter in 1999, moving to his home town club, Bologna, after the former Juventus boss Marcello Lippi took charge of Inter and signed Angelo Peruzzi from his former club.

After Bologna were relegated to Serie B in 2004–05, despite Pagliuca's outstanding season, he stayed with the club for one more year; then he returned to Serie A, accepting a contract with Ascoli for one year starting in summer of 2006. On 17 September 2006, Pagliuca set the record for most Serie A appearances for a goalkeeper, overtaking Dino Zoff, as he started against Messina. He retired at the end of the season.

== International career ==
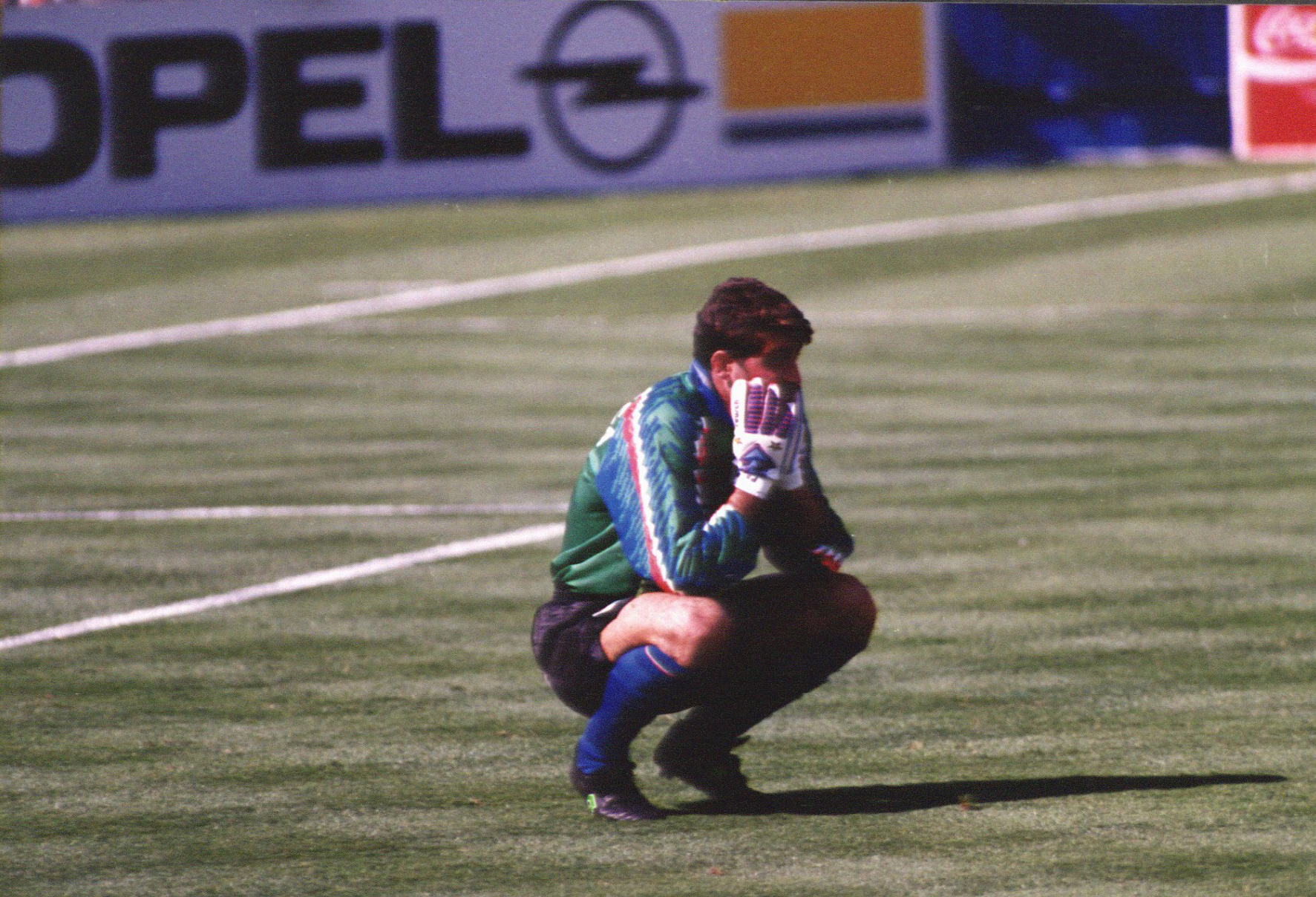
Pagliuca contemplates a red card against Norway at the 1994 World Cup

After taking part in the 1990 World Cup without playing a minute, Pagliuca overtook Walter Zenga, Stefano Tacconi and Luca Marchegiani, becoming first choice goalkeeper for Italy at the 1994 World Cup under Arrigo Sacchi. He received the dubious honour of being the first goalkeeper to be sent off in a World Cup match, when he was dismissed for handling outside his area against Norway. However, he returned after suspension to feature from the quarter-finals onwards with his team losing the final to Brazil in a penalty shootout. Despite the loss, Pagliuca became the first ever goalkeeper to save a penalty from a shootout in a World Cup final, denying Márcio Santos his shot.

In 1995, Pagliuca's international career was halted by the emergence of Juventus goalkeeper Angelo Peruzzi, his perceived career rival, and it would be two years before he returned to the Italy senior squad, although he took part at the Olympics with the under-21 side as an overage player in 1996. Under Cesare Maldini, Pagliuca would have taken part in the 1998 World Cup only as a back-up, but he earned the starting spot because of a last-minute injury to Peruzzi. He made one of the saves of the tournament, again against Norway, when he shot out a hand to prevent Tore André Flo's point-blank header from netting. However, Italy lost against host country France in the quarter-final after the penalty shootout, even though Pagliuca blocked Bixente Lizarazu's shot.

After the tournament, the emergence of fellow keepers Francesco Toldo and Gianluigi Buffon (who were, themselves, Pagliuca's deputies in the 1998 World Cup), along with Peruzzi's recovery from his injury, put an end to Pagliuca's international career on 39 caps.

== Post-retirement career ==
Pagliuca went into coaching upon retirement. He re-joined his hometown club Bologna as a youth coach in 2014, and was appointed goalkeeping coach of the club's primavera (under 19) team in 2016, a role he continues to occupy. He also provides regular interviews and commentary to the Italian and international sporting media.

== Style of play ==
An agile, consistent and athletic goalkeeper, Pagliuca was renowned for his quick reactions, diving saves, and penalty-stopping abilities, as well as his control of the ball, accurate distribution, and deep goal kicks with his left foot. In addition to being skilled acrobatics-wise, he also possessed a good positional sense. Although he was capable of coming off the line to handle crosses, he performed better between the posts. Nicknamed The Wall, due to his goalkeeping abilities and consistency, he also distinguished himself by his strong temper, which occasionally had a negative impact on his performances, when he let his emotions get the better of him.

Under coaches Sven-Göran Eriksson and Arrigo Sacchi, who relied on high defensive lines, Pagliuca used to play as a sweeper-keeper. Known for his dedication, physical conditioning, and work-rate, Pagliuca also stood out for his ability to avoid injury and longevity throughout his career.

== Personal life ==
Pagliuca was born in Bologna, Emilia-Romagna and supports local side Bologna FC 1909, to which he also made 248 appearances at between 1999 and 2006. Furthermore, Pagliuca has also spoken of his support for Premier League club Aston Villa F.C.

His son Mattia Pagliuca is also a professional footballer. He made his Serie A debut in December 2020 for Bologna FC 1909 as a winger.

== Career statistics ==
=== Club ===
Appearances and goals by club, season and competition
Club	Season	League			Coppa Italia		Europe		Other		Total	
Club	Season	Division	Apps	Goals	Apps	Goals	Apps	Goals	Apps	Goals	Apps	Goals
Sampdoria	1986–87	Serie A	0	0	—		—		—		0	0
Sampdoria	1987–88	Serie A	2	0	5	0	—		—		7	0
Sampdoria	1988–89	Serie A	33	0	12	0	5	0	—		50	0
Sampdoria	1989–90	Serie A	34	0	5	0	7	0	—		46	0
Sampdoria	1990–91	Serie A	32	0	10	0	8	0	—		50	0
Sampdoria	1991–92	Serie A	34	0	9	0	11	0	—		54	0
Sampdoria	1992–93	Serie A	29	0	—		—		—		29	0
Sampdoria	1993–94	Serie A	34	0	10	0	—		—		44	0
Sampdoria	Total		198	0	51	0	31	0	0	0	280	0
Inter Milan	1994–95	Serie A	34	0	7	0	2	0	—		43	0
Inter Milan	1995–96	Serie A	34	0	6	0	2	0	—		42	0
Inter Milan	1996–97	Serie A	34	0	7	0	12	0	—		53	0
Inter Milan	1997–98	Serie A	34	0	4	0	11	0	—		49	0
Inter Milan	1998–99	Serie A	29	0	6	0	10	0	2 (Note: Two appearances in UEFA Cup qualification)	0	47	0
Inter Milan	Total		165	0	30	0	37	0	2	0	234	0
Bologna	1999–00	Serie A	32	0	3	0	6	0	—		41	0
Bologna	2000–01	Serie A	34	0	2	0	—		—		36	0
Bologna	2001–02	Serie A	34	0	—		—		—		34	0
Bologna	2002–03	Serie A	34	0	—		4	0	—		38	0
Bologna	2003–04	Serie A	34	0	—		—		—		34	0
Bologna	2004–05	Serie A	38	0	—		—		2 (Note: Two appearances in relegation play-offs to Serie B)	0	40	0
Bologna	2005–06	Serie B	42	0	2	0	—		—		44	0
Bologna	Total		248	0	7	0	10	0	2	0	267	0
Ascoli	2006–07	Serie A	23	0	2	0	—		—		25	0
Career total			634	0	90	0	78	0	4	0	806	0

=== International ===
Appearances and goals by national team and year
National team	Year	Apps	Goals
Italy	1991	3	0
Italy	1992	3	0
Italy	1993	8	0
Italy	1994	13	0
Italy	1995	3	0
Italy	1996	0	0
Italy	1997	3	0
Italy	1998	6	0
Total		39	0

== Honours ==
Sampdoria

- Serie A: 1990–91
- Coppa Italia: 1987–88, 1988–89, 1993–94
- Supercoppa Italiana: 1991
- UEFA Cup Winners' Cup: 1989–90; runner-up: 1988-89
- European Cup runner-up: 1991–92

Inter

- UEFA Cup: 1997–98; runner-up: 1996-97

Italy

- FIFA World Cup runner-up: 1994 third place: 1990
- Scania 100 Tournament: 1991

Individual

- Pirata d'Oro (Internazionale Player Of The Year): 1995
- Guerin d'Oro: 1996–97, 2004–05
- Inter Milan Hall of Fame: 2021

Orders

- 5th Class / Knight: Cavaliere Ordine al Merito della Repubblica Italiana: 1991
