= 1990–91 Serie A =

89th season of top-tier Italian football

Serie A
- Season: 1990–91
- Dates: 9 September 1990 – 26 May 1991
- Champions: Sampdoria; 1st title
- Relegated: Lecce; Pisa; Cesena; Bologna
- European Cup: Sampdoria
- Cup Winners' Cup: Roma
- UEFA Cup: Internazionale; Genoa; Torino; Parma
- Matches: 306
- Goals: 702 (2.29 per match)
- Top goalscorer: Gianluca Vialli (19 goals)
- Longest winning run: 20 matches Sampdoria
- Longest unbeaten run: 18 matches Sampdoria
- Longest winless run: 4 matches Bologna
- Longest losing run: 20 matches Pisa

Serie A 1990-91 team distribution

The 1990-91 season saw Sampdoria win the Serie A title for the first time in their history, finishing five points ahead of second placed Milan. Third placed Internazionale were victorious in the UEFA Cup, with ninth-placed Roma compensating for their sub-standard league season with glory in the Coppa Italia, while Juventus's seventh-placed finish meant that they would be without European action for the first season in three decades. Lecce, Pisa, Cesena and Bologna were all relegated.

A notable record was set on 9 December 1990 in a Serie A fixture, when Bologna player Giuseppe Lorenzo was sent off after just 10 seconds for striking an opponent in the match against Parma. This was reportedly the fastest sending off in senior football worldwide at the time.

This is the most recent Serie A season to date in which a team won their first Italian title.

== Personnel and sponsoring ==
Team	Head coach	Kit manufacturer	Shirt sponsor
Atalanta	(Italy) Bruno Giorgi	Ennerre	Tamoil
Bari	(Italy) Gaetano Salvemini	Adidas	Sud Factoring
Bologna	(Italy) Luigi Radice	Uhlsport	Mercatone Uno
Cagliari	(Italy) Claudio Ranieri	Umbro	Formaggi Ovini Sardi
Cesena	(Italy) Alberto Batistoni	Adidas	Amadori
Fiorentina	(Brazil) Sebastião Lazaroni	ABM	La Nazione
Genoa	(Italy) Osvaldo Bagnoli	Erreà	Mita
Internazionale	(Italy) Giovanni Trapattoni	Uhlsport	Misura
Juventus	(Italy) Luigi Maifredi	Kappa	UPIM
Lazio	(Italy) Dino Zoff	Umbro	Cassa di Risparmio di Roma
Lecce	(Poland) Zbigniew Boniek	Adidas	Dreher
Milan	(Italy) Arrigo Sacchi	Adidas	Mediolanum
Napoli	(Italy) Alberto Bigon	Ennerre	Mars
Parma	(Italy) Nevio Scala	Umbro	Parmalat
Pisa	(Romania) Mircea Lucescu	Gems	Giocheria
Roma	(Italy) Ottavio Bianchi	Ennerre	Barilla
Sampdoria	(Socialist Federal Republic of Yugoslavia) Vujadin Boškov	Asics	Erg
Torino	(Italy) Emiliano Mondonico	ABM	Indesit

== Final classification ==
Pos	Team	Pld	W	D	L	GF	GA	GD	Pts	Qualification or relegation
1	Sampdoria (C)	34	20	11	3	57	24	+33	51	Qualification to European Cup
2	Milan (Note: In March 1991, UEFA banned Milan from participating in European competition for one season due to refusing to resume their 1990-91 European Cup quarterfinal match away versus Olympique Marseille. The ban went into effect for the 1991–92 UEFA Cup.)	34	18	10	6	46	19	+27	46	Banned from European competition
3	Internazionale	34	18	10	6	56	31	+25	46	Qualification to UEFA Cup
4	Genoa	34	14	12	8	51	36	+15	40	Qualification to UEFA Cup
5	Torino	34	12	14	8	40	29	+11	38	Qualification to UEFA Cup
6	Parma (Note: Parma qualified for the 1991–92 UEFA Cup as a substitute for the banned Milan.)	34	13	12	9	35	31	+4	38	Qualification to UEFA Cup
7	Juventus	34	13	11	10	45	32	+13	37	
8	Napoli	34	11	15	8	37	37	0	37	
9	Roma	34	11	14	9	43	37	+6	36	Qualification to Cup Winners' Cup
10	Atalanta	34	11	13	10	38	37	+1	35	
11	Lazio	34	8	19	7	33	36	−3	35	
12	Fiorentina	34	8	15	11	40	34	+6	31	
13	Bari	34	9	11	14	41	47	−6	29	
14	Cagliari	34	6	17	11	29	44	−15	29	
15	Lecce (R)	34	6	13	15	20	47	−27	25	Relegation to Serie B
16	Pisa (R)	34	8	6	20	34	60	−26	22	Relegation to Serie B
17	Cesena (R)	34	5	9	20	28	58	−30	19	Relegation to Serie B
18	Bologna (R)	34	4	10	20	29	63	−34	18	Relegation to Serie B

Source: 1990–91 Serie A, RSSSF.com
Rules for classification: 1) Points; 2) Head-to-head points; 3) Head-to-head goal difference; 4) Goal difference; 5) Goals scored; 6) Draw.
(C) Champions; (R) Relegated

== Results ==
Home \ Away	ATA	BAR	BOL	CAG	CES	FIO	GEN	INT	JUV	LAZ	LEC	MIL	NAP	PAR	PIS	ROM	SAM	TOR
Atalanta	—	2–0	4–0	2–1	3–0	2–1	0–0	1–1	0–0	4–1 (Note: The match was played at Stadio Renato Dall'Ara.)	2–1	0–2	0–0	0–0	1–0	2–2	1–1	0–1
Bari	4–1	—	4–0	4–1	1–0	0–0	4–0	1–1	2–0	0–0	1–1	2–1	0–0	2–2	2–0	0–1	1–1	2–1
Bologna	1–1	3–0	—	1–2	0–1	1–1	0–3	0–0	0–1	1–2	1–1	1–1	1–0	1–3	0–1	2–3	0–3	1–0
Cagliari	1–1	1–1	0–0	—	0–0	1–1	1–0	0–3	0–0	0–1	2–0	1–1	1–1	2–1	2–1	0–0	0–0	1–2
Cesena	0–1	4–2	3–2	3–0	—	0–4	1–1	1–5	1–1	1–1	3–1	0–1	0–0	0–1	1–1	1–1	0–1	2–2
Fiorentina	3–1	1–1	1–0	4–1	2–0	—	2–2	0–0	1–0	1–1	0–0	0–0	0–0	2–3	4–0	1–1	0–0	0–0
Genoa	2–0	3–1	0–0	2–2	4–1	3–2	—	3–0	2–0	3–1	0–0	1–1	1–1	2–1	4–2	3–0	0–0	0–0
Internazionale	3–1	5–1	1–0	1–1	2–0	1–1	2–1	—	2–0	2–0	5–0	0–1	2–1	2–1	6–3	2–1	0–2	1–0
Juventus	1–1	3–1	1–1	2–2	3–0	2–1	0–1	4–2	—	0–0	0–0	0–3	1–0	5–0	4–2	5–0	0–0	1–2
Lazio	2–2	1–1	3–1	1–1	1–1	2–1	1–1	0–0	1–0	—	2–0	1–1	0–2	0–0	0–0	1–1	3–3	2–1
Lecce	0–0	1–1	1–3	2–0	2–0	2–0	0–3	0–2	0–1	1–0	—	0–3	0–0	1–0	1–1	1–1	1–0	1–1
Milan	0–1	2–0	6–0	2–0	2–0	2–1	1–0	0–1	2–0	3–1	1–0	—	4–1	0–0	1–0	1–1	0–1	1–0
Napoli	2–0	1–0	3–2	1–2	1–0	1–0	1–0	1–1	1–1	2–1	2–2	1–1	—	4–2	2–1	1–1	1–4	2–1
Parma	1–0	1–0	1–1	2–0	2–0	1–0	2–1	0–0	1–2	0–0	0–0	2–0	1–0	—	2–3	2–1	0–0	0–0
Pisa	0–2	1–0	2–2	1–0	3–2	0–4	0–0	0–1	1–5	0–1	4–0	0–1	1–1	0–2	—	0–1	0–3	2–0
Roma	2–1	1–0	4–1	0–0	4–1	4–0	3–1	1–1	0–1	1–1	3–0	0–0	1–1	1–1	0–2	—	0–1	2–0
Sampdoria	4–1	3–2	2–1	2–2	1–0	1–0	1–2	3–1	1–0	1–1	3–0	2–0	4–1	1–0	4–2	2–1	—	1–2
Torino	0–0	4–0	4–1	1–1	2–1	1–1	5–2	2–0	1–1	0–0	2–0	1–1	1–1	0–0	1–0	1–0	1–1	—

Legend: Blue = home team win; Yellow = draw; Red = away team win.

== Top goalscorers ==
Rank	Player	Club	Goals
1	(Italy) Gianluca Vialli	Sampdoria	19
2	(Germany) Lothar Matthäus	Internazionale	16
3	(Uruguay) Carlos Aguilera	Genoa	15
3	(Czechoslovakia) Tomáš Skuhravý	Genoa	15
5	(Italy) Roberto Baggio	Juventus	14
5	(Germany) Jürgen Klinsmann	Internazionale	14
7	(Italy) Giorgio Bresciani	Torino	13
7	(Italy) Massimo Ciocci	Cesena	13
7	(Italy) Alessandro Melli	Parma	13
7	(Brazil) João Paulo	Bari	13

== Season tickets ==
The season ticket sales as they were before the beginning of the season:

Source: Statistiche Spettatori Serie A 1990-1991

Rank	Club	Tickets
1	Milan	69,322
2	Napoli	41,676
3	Inter	33,138
4	Juventus	25,973
5	Roma	22.848
6	Torino	22.072
7	Sampdoria	20.474
8	Lazio	15.816
9	Fiorentina	15.061
10	Genoa	14.500
11	Parma	13.444
12	Bari	13,186
13	Cagliari	12.861
14	Bologna	10.066
15	Atalanta	8.290
16	Pisa	6.586
17	Cesena	4.818
18	Lecce	2.881

== Attendances ==
No.	Club	Average
1	Milan	77,488
2	Internazionale	54,946
3	Napoli	52,657
4	Roma	43,570
5	Juventus	43,114
6	Lazio	36,371
7	Torino	33,990
8	Bari	32,130
9	Sampdoria	31,338
10	Genoa	31,202
11	Fiorentina	30,733
12	Cagliari	26,933
13	Bologna	21,590
14	Atalanta	18,829
15	Lecce	18,239
16	Parma	18,005
17	Cesena	13,828
18	Pisa	13,607

== Sources ==
- Almanacco Illustrato del Calcio - La Storia 1898-2004, Panini Edizioni, Modena, September 2005
