= 1994–95 SSC Napoli season =

Napoli
1994-95 season
- Owner: Ellenio Gallo (46,5%); Ettore Setten (46,5%)
- President: Ellenio Gallo
- Manager: Vincenzo Guerini (until 17 October 1994); Vujadin Boškov
- Stadium: San Paolo
- Serie A: 7th
- Coppa Italia: Quarter-finals
- UEFA Cup: Last 16
- Top goalscorer: League: Massimo Agostini (9); All: Massimo Agostini (13)
Home colours	Away colours	Third colours

SSC Napoli performed about the same as it had in the 1993-94 season, finishing seventh in the championship, but having a better domestic cup run. Napoli also reached the Last 16 of the UEFA Cup, where it lost to Eintracht Frankfurt. The squad had been depleted due to losses of several offensive key players in the seasons before, so seventh in the domestic league would normally have been regarded as a positive result, but it was only after Vujadin Boškov had been appointed to lead the team in place of Vincenzo Guerini that Napoli could stay well clear of the relegation zone. Brazilian signing André Cruz was crucial to the defense, and also showed unusual offensive skills for a central defender, scoring several goals. Fabio Cannavaro also had a spectacular season, which ended with Parma buying the defender.

== Squad ==
Note: Flags indicate national team as defined under FIFA eligibility rules; some limited exceptions apply. Players may hold more than one non-FIFA nationality.

Pos.	Nation	Player
GK	ITA	Giuseppe Taglialatela
GK	ITA	Raffaele Di Fusco
GK	AUS	Eduardo Scalzi
DF	BRA	André Cruz
DF	ITA	Salvatore Matrecano
DF	ITA	Fabio Cannavaro
DF	ITA	Massimo Tarantino
DF	ITA	Luca Luzardi
DF	ITA	Gabriele Grossi
DF	ITA	Alessandro Sbrizzo
DF	ITA	Ciro Caruso
DF	ITA	Raffaele Longo
MF	ITA	Fausto Pari

Pos.	Nation	Player
MF	ITA	Roberto Policano
MF	ITA	Fabio Pecchia
MF	ITA	Renato Buso
MF	ITA	Gaetano De Rosa
MF	FRA	Alain Boghossian
MF	ITA	Roberto Bordin
MF	ITA	Luca Altomare
MF	ITA	Eugenio Corini
FW	ITA	Carmelo Imbriani
FW	ITA	Massimo Agostini
FW	COL	Freddy Rincón
FW	ITA	Benito Carbone
FW	ITA	Franco Lerda

=== Transfers ===
In
Pos.	Name	from	Type
FW	Benito Carbone	Torino	
MF	Freddy Rincon	Palmeiras	loan
DF	André Cruz	Standard Liège	
MF	Alain Boghossian	Olympique Marseille	
FW	Massimo Agostini	AC Ancona	
DF	Salvatore Matrecano	Parma FC	
FW	Franco Lerda	Brescia Calcio	
DF	Luca Luzardi	SS Lazio	
DF	Gabriele Grossi	AS Bari	
MF	Luca Altomare	Lucchese	loan ended
MF	Eugenio Corini	Sampdoria	loan

Out
Pos.	Name	To	Type
DF	Ciro Ferrara	Juventus	
FW	Daniel Fonseca	AS Roma	
MF	Jonas Thern	AS Roma	
FW	Paolo Di Canio	AC Milan	
DF	Giovanni Bia	Inter Milan	
DF	Giancarlo Corradini		retired
DF	Giovanni Francini	Brescia Calcio	
DF	Enzo Gambaro	AC Milan	loan ended
DF	Sebastiano Nela	-	retired
FW	Giorgio Bresciani	AC Reggiana	
GK	Angelo Pagotto	Pistoiese	

== Competitions ==
=== Serie A ===
==== League table ====
Pos	Team	Pld	W	D	L	GF	GA	GD	Pts	Qualification or relegation
5	Roma	34	16	11	7	46	25	+21	59	Qualification to UEFA Cup
6	Internazionale	34	14	10	10	39	34	+5	52	Qualification to UEFA Cup
7	Napoli	34	13	12	9	40	45	−5	51	
8	Sampdoria	34	13	11	10	51	37	+14	50	
9	Cagliari	34	13	10	11	40	39	+1	49	

Source: Serie A, RSSSF.com, Soccerway
Rules for classification: 1) Points; 2) Head-to-head points; 3) Head-to-head goal difference; 4) Goal difference; 5) Goals scored; 6) Draw. (Note: Head-to-head record is used only after all the matches between the teams in question have been played).

==== Results by round ====
Round	1	2	3	4	5	6	7	8	9	10	11	12	13	14	15	16	17	18	19	20	21	22	23	24	25	26	27	28	29	30	31	32	33	34
Ground	H	A	H	A	H	A	H	A	H	A	H	A	H	H	A	H	A	A	H	A	H	A	H	A	H	A	H	A	H	A	A	H	A	H
Result	W	L	L	D	D	L	W	D	D	L	D	D	W	D	D	D	L	W	W	L	W	L	W	D	W	D	L	W	D	L	W	W	W	W
Position	7	9	10	13	13	15	13	13	13	14	13	12	12	12	13	13	13	13	11	13	12	12	10	11	11	11	11	11	11	12	10	10	8	7

Source: Competitive matches
A = Away; H = Home; W = Win; D = Draw; L = Loss; = Leader, 1995–96 UEFA Champions League Group stage; = 1995–96 UEFA Cup First round; = 1995–96 Serie B

==== Matches ====
4 September 1994 1	Napoli	1–0	Reggiana	Naples
	Carbone 89'			Stadium: San Paolo

11 September 1994 2	Cremonese	2–0	Napoli
	Florijančič 42', 89'

18 September 1994 3	Napoli	0–2	Juventus	Naples
			Ravanelli 32'; Del Piero 72'	Stadium: San Paolo

25 September 1994 4	Genoa	3–3	Napoli
	Nappi 8'; Bortolazzi 43'; Cannavaro 59' (o.g.)		Buso 22'; Policano 31'; André Cruz 83'

2 October 1994 5	Napoli	3–3	Padova	Naples
	Rincón 52', 84' (pen.); Agostini 55'		Longhi 66' (pen.); Maniero 85', 86'	Stadium: San Paolo

16 October 1994 6	Lazio	5–1	Napoli
	Bokšić 3'; Winter 20', 42'; Casiraghi 36'; Negro 38'		Pecchia 33'

23 October 1994 7	Napoli	3–0	Bari	Naples
	Agostini 43', 75'; Carbone 90' (pen.)			Stadium: San Paolo

30 October 1994 8	Sampdoria	0–0	Napoli

6 November 1994 9	Roma	1–1	Napoli
	Moriero 38'		Boghossian 70'

20 November 1994 10	Napoli	2–5	Fiorentina	Naples
	Agostini 56', 59'		André Cruz 15' (o.g.); Cannavaro 73' (o.g.); Cois 81'; Batistuta 84', 90' (pen.)	Stadium: San Paolo

27 November 1994 11	Foggia	1–1	Napoli
	Mandelli 31'		Bianchini 58' (o.g.)

4 December 1994 12	Napoli	1–1	Torino	Naples
	Carbone 51'		Angloma 43'	Stadium: San Paolo

11 December 1994 13	Inter	0–2	Napoli
			Jonk 29' (o.g.); André Cruz 67'

18 December 1994 14	Napoli	1–1	Brescia	Naples
	André Cruz 78'		Corini 22'	Stadium: San Paolo

8 January 1995 15	Milan	1–1	Napoli
	Simone 73'		Cannavaro 87'

15 January 1995 16	Napoli	1–1	Cagliari	Naples
	André Cruz 23'		Muzzi 32'	Stadium: San Paolo

22 January 1995 17	Parma	2–0	Napoli
	Asprilla 4'; Zola 50' (pen.)

29 January 1995 18	Reggiana	1–2	Napoli
	Zanutta 90'		Rincón 38'; André Cruz 74'

12 February 1995 19	Napoli	1–0	Cremonese	Naples
	Rincón 57'			Stadium: San Paolo

19 February 1995 20	Juventus	1–0	Napoli
	Ravanelli 78'

26 February 1995 21	Napoli	1–0	Genoa	Naples
	Rincón 36'			Stadium: San Paolo

5 March 1995 22	Padova	2–0	Napoli
	Franceschetti 62'; Longhi 66' (pen.)

12 March 1995 23	Napoli	3–2	Lazio	Naples
	Rincón 49', 56'; Buso 87'		Casiraghi 20', 40'	Stadium: San Paolo

19 March 1995 24	Bari	1–1	Napoli
	Tovalieri 5'		Fontana 27'

2 April 1995 25	Napoli	2–0	Sampdoria	Naples
	Carbone 32'; Agostini 43'			Stadium: San Paolo

9 April 1995 26	Napoli	0–0	Roma	Naples
				Stadium: San Paolo

15 April 1995 27	Fiorentina	4–0	Napoli
	Sottil 17'; Márcio Santos 47'; Batistuta 55'; Cois 82'

23 April 1995 28	Napoli	2–1	Foggia	Naples
	André Cruz 23'; De Vincenzo 73' (o.g.)		Biagioni 42'	Stadium: San Paolo

30 April 1995 29	Torino	1–1	Napoli
	Rizzitelli 90'		Buso 31'

7 May 1995 30	Napoli	1–3	Internazionale	Naples
	André Cruz 34'		Orlandini 11'; Berti 65'; Bergkamp 84'	Stadium: San Paolo

14 May 1995 31	Brescia	1–2	Napoli
	Galli 82'		Imbriani 39'; Agostini 49'

18 May 1995 32	Napoli	1–0	Milan	Naples
	Agostini 45'			Stadium: San Paolo

28 May 1995 33	Cagliari	0–1	Napoli
			Pecchia 16'

4 June 1995 34	Napoli	1–0	Parma	Naples
	Agostini 24' (pen.)			Stadium: San Paolo

=== Coppa Italia ===
==== Second round ====
31 August 1994 First leg	Napoli	3–2	Fidelis Andria	Naples
	Pari 32'; Giampietro 52' (o.g.); Pecchia 63'		80', 84' (pen.) Cappellacci	Stadium: San Paolo; Referee: Cardona

21 September 1994 Second leg	Fidelis Andria	1–1	Napoli	Prato
	Massara 4' (pen.)		80' (pen.) B. Carbone	Stadium: Stadio Degli Ulivi; Referee: Braschi

==== Round of 16 ====
11 October 1994 First leg	Napoli	3–0	Cremonese	Napoli
	B. Carbone 18', 63' (pen.); Agostini 44'			Stadium: Stadio San Paolo; Referee: Treossi

26 October 1994 Second leg	Cremonese	0–1	Napoli	Cremona
			88' Agostini	Stadium: Giovanni Zini; Referee: Cinciripini

==== Quarter-finals ====
29 November 1994 First leg	Lazio	1–0	Napoli	Rome
	Winter 29'			Stadium: Olimpico; Referee: Nicchi

14 December 1994 Second leg	Napoli	1–2 (1–3 agg.)	Lazio	Naples
	Lerda 42'		50' Negro; 89' Signori	Stadium: San Paolo; Referee: Stafoggia

=== UEFA Cup ===
==== First round ====
13 September 1994	Napoli	2–0	(Latvia) Skonto Riga	Naples
	B. Carbone 30' (pen.), 49'	Report		Stadium: San Paolo; Referee: (Portugal) Mendes

27 September 1994	Skonto Riga (Latvia)	0–1	(Italy) Napoli	Riga
		Report	31' Buso	Stadium: Daugava Stadium; Referee: (Sweden) Nilsson

==== Second round ====
18 October 1994	Boavista (Portugal)	1–1	Napoli	Porto
	Sánchez 26'	Report	58' B. Carbone	Stadium: Estádio do Bessa; Referee: (Germany) Weber

1 November 1994	Napoli (Italy)	2–1	(Portugal) Boavista	Naples
	Agostini 19', 35'	Report	76' Luciano	Stadium: Stadio San Paolo; Referee: (Czech Republic) Meier

==== Round of 16 ====
24 November 1994	Eintracht Frankfurt (Germany)	1–0	(Italy) Napoli	Frankfurt
	Buso 55' (o.g.)	Report		Stadium: Waldstadion; Referee: (Hungary) Puhl

7 December 1994	Napoli (Italy)	0–1	(Germany) Eintracht Frankfurt	Naples
		Report	54' Falkenmayer	Stadium: San Paolo; Referee: (Netherlands) van der Ende

== Statistics ==
=== Players statistics ===
No.	Pos	Nat	Player	Total		Serie A		Coppa		UEFA	
No.	Pos	Nat	Player	Apps	Goals	Apps	Goals	Apps	Goals	Apps	Goals
	GK	(Italy) ITA	Giuseppe Taglialatela	43	-49	33	-43	4	-2	6	-4
	DF	(Brazil) BRA	André Cruz	39	7	30	7	5	0	4	0
	DF	(Italy) ITA	Fabio Cannavaro	36	1	28+1	1	4	0	3	0
	DF	(Italy) ITA	Massimo Tarantino	36	0	26+1	0	3	0	6	0
	MF	(Italy) ITA	Benito Carbone	40	10	27+2	4	6	3	5	3
	MF	(Italy) ITA	Fausto Pari	43	1	31+1	0	5	1	6	0
	MF	(Italy) ITA	Roberto Bordin	37	0	29+1	0	3	0	4	0
	MF	(Italy) ITA	Fabio Pecchia	42	3	32	2	5	1	5	0
	FW	(Italy) ITA	Renato Buso	43	4	30+2	3	5	0	6	1
	FW	(Italy) ITA	Massimo Agostini	43	13	31+1	9	5	2	6	2
	FW	(Colombia) COL	Freddy Rincón	38	7	27+1	7	5	0	5	0
	GK	(Italy) ITA	Raffaele Di Fusco	5	-6	1+1	-2	3	-4	0	0
	DF	(Italy) ITA	Salvatore Matrecano	22	0	13+3	0	3	0	3	0
	MF	(France) FRA	Alain Boghossian	16	1	9	1	3	0	4	0
	DF	(Italy) ITA	Gabriele Grossi	17	0	8+1	0	4	0	4	0
	MF	(Italy) ITA	Roberto Policano	26	1	6+12	1	4	0	4	0
	FW	(Italy) ITA	Franco Lerda	14	1	4+8	0	2	1		
	FW	(Italy) ITA	Carmelo Imbriani	6	1	4+2	1				
	DF	(Italy) ITA	Luca Luzardi	11	0	4+1	0	2	0	4	0
	DF	(Italy) ITA	Alessandro Sbrizzo	1	0	1	0				
	MF	(Italy) ITA	Luca Altomare	9	0	0+5	0	4	0		
	MF	(Italy) ITA	Eugenio Corini	8	0	0+3	0	3	0	2	0
	DF	(Italy) ITA	Raffaele Longo	2	0	0+2	0				
	GK	(Australia) AUS	Eduardo Scalzi	0	0	0	0				
	GK	(Italy) ITA	Infanti	0	0	0	0				
	DF	(Italy) ITA	Ciro Caruso								
	DF	(Italy) ITA	D'Angelo	0	0	0	0				
	MF	(Italy) ITA	Gaetano De Rosa								

- Source: http://calcio-seriea.net/presenze/1994/1078/

== Sources ==
- RSSSF - Italy 1994/95
