= 1995–96 SSC Napoli season =

Napoli
1995–96 season
- Owner: Corrado Ferlaino
- President: Vincenzo Schiano di Colella
- Head coach: Vujadin Boškov
- Stadium: San Paolo
- Serie A: 12th
- Coppa Italia: Last 32
- Top goalscorer: League: Arturo Di Napoli (5); All: Arturo Di Napoli (5)
Home colours	Away colours	Third colours

In the 1995-96 SSC Napoli season, the club finished in the lower midfield of the table, once again missing out on the international competitions. Goalscoring was at a premium, but the tight defence led by Latin Americans Roberto Ayala and André Cruz, ensured that Napoli did not go close to relegation. Goalkeeper Giuseppe Taglialatela also strengthened his reputation with a solid season.

== Squad ==
Note: Flags indicate national team as defined under FIFA eligibility rules; some limited exceptions apply. Players may hold more than one non-FIFA nationality.

No.	Pos.	Nation	Player
1	GK	ITA	Giuseppe Taglialatela
2	DF	ARG	Roberto Ayala
3	DF	ITA	Massimo Tarantino
4	MF	ITA	Roberto Bordin
5	DF	BRA	André Cruz
6	DF	ITA	Salvatore Matrecano
7	MF	ITA	Renato Buso
8	MF	FRA	Alain Boghossian
9	FW	ITA	Massimo Agostini
10	FW	ITA	Fausto Pizzi
11	MF	ITA	Fabio Pecchia
12	GK	ITA	Raffaele Di Fusco
13	DF	ITA	Alessandro Sbrizzo

No.	Pos.	Nation	Player
14	MF	ITA	Fausto Pari
15	DF	ITA	Francesco Baldini
16	DF	ITA	Francesco Colonnese
18	MF	ITA	Raffaele Longo
19	FW	ITA	Carmelo Imbriani
20	FW	ITA	Arturo Di Napoli
21	MF	ITA	Roberto Policano
22	GK	ITA	Federico Infanti
24	MF	ITA	Luca Altomare
25	DF	ITA	Mirko Taccola
26	DF	ITA	Ciro Caruso

=== Transfers ===
In
Pos.	Name	from	Type
DF	Roberto Ayala	River Plate	€3.20 million
FW	Arturo Di Napoli	Gualdo	
DF	Francesco Baldini	Lucchese	
FW	Fausto Pizzi	Udinese Calcio	

Out
Pos.	Name	To	Type
DF	Fabio Cannavaro	Parma FC	€6.70 million
MF	Freddy Rincon	Palmeiras	loan ended
MF	Benito Carbone	Inter Milan	
MF	Eugenio Corini	Sampdoria	loan ended
MF	Gaetano De Rosa	Savoia	
FW	Franco Lerda	Brescia Calcio	

==== Winter ====
In
Pos.	Name	from	Type
DF	Francesco Colonnese	AS Roma	loan

Out
Pos.	Name	To	Type
DF	Salvatore Matrecano	Udinese	

== Competitions ==
=== Serie A ===
==== League table ====
Pos	Team	Pld	W	D	L	GF	GA	GD	Pts
10	Cagliari	34	11	8	15	34	47	−13	41 (Note: CAG 7pts. UDI 6pts. NAP 4pts.)
11	Udinese	34	11	8	15	41	49	−8	41
12	Napoli	34	10	11	13	28	41	−13	41
13	Atalanta	34	11	6	17	38	50	−12	39
14	Piacenza	34	9	10	15	31	48	−17	37

Source: 1995–96 Serie A, RSSSF.com, Soccerway
Rules for classification: 1) Points; 2) Head-to-head points; 3) Head-to-head goal difference; 4) Goal difference; 5) Goals scored; 6) Draw. (Note: Head-to-head record is used only after all the matches between the teams in question have been played).

==== Results by round ====
Round	1	2	3	4	5	6	7	8	9	10	11	12	13	14	15	16	17	18	19	20	21	22	23	24	25	26	27	28	29	30	31	32	33	34
Ground	H	A	H	A	H	A	H	A	H	A	H	A	H	H	A	H	A	A	H	A	H	A	H	A	H	A	H	A	H	A	A	H	A	H
Result	D	W	W	W	D	L	W	D	D	D	L	D	D	L	D	W	L	W	L	W	L	L	L	D	D	W	L	D	L	L	L	W	L	W
Position	7	4	3	2	2	5	2	4	4	5	7	7	7	10	10	7	10	6	7	6	7	9	11	11	11	12	13	13	10	12	13	11	11	12

Source: Competitive matches
A = Away; H = Home; W = Win; D = Draw; L = Loss; = Leader, 1996–97 UEFA Champions League Group stage; = 1996–97 UEFA Cup First round; = 1996-97 Serie B

==== Matches ====
27 August 1995 1	Bari	1–1	Napoli	Bari
	Protti 3'		86' (pen.) André Cruz	Stadium: San Nicola; Attendance: 34 746; Referee: Gianni Beschin

10 September 1995 2	Napoli	2–0	Padova	Naples
	Pecchia 7'; Agostini 70'			Stadium: San Paolo

17 September 1995 3	Atalanta	1–3	Napoli
	Vieri 4'		Buso 31'; Imbriani 63'; Agostini 74'

24 September 1995 4	Napoli	2–1	Inter Milan	Naples
	Imbriani 33'; Buso 66'		Fontolan 46'	Stadium: San Paolo

1 October 1995 5	Juventus	1–1	Napoli
	Vialli 55'		52' Pecchia

15 October 1995 6	Napoli	0–2	Fiorentina	Naples
			Tarantino 78' (o.g.); Orlando 86'	Stadium: San Paolo

22 October 1995 7	Piacenza	0–1	Napoli
			Taibi 69' (o.g.)

29 October 1995 8	Napoli	0–0	Cremonese	Naples
				Stadium: San Paolo

5 November 1995 9	Torino	0–0	Napoli

19 November 1995 10	Napoli	1–1	Vicenza	Naples
	Agostini 45'		Otero 9'	Stadium: San Paolo

26 November 1995 11	Cagliari	2–0	Napoli
	Firicano 21, 90'

3 December 1995 12	Napoli	1–1	Parma	Naples
	Pizzi 38'		Zola 52' (pen.)	Stadium: San Paolo

10 December 1995 13	Milan	0–0	Napoli

17 December 1995 14	Napoli	0–2	Roma	Naples
			Thern 13'; Delvecchio 70'	Stadium: San Paolo

23 December 1995 15	Sampdoria	2–2	Napoli
	André Cruz 45' (o.g.); Chiesa 48'		Di Napoli 54'; Buso 75'

7 January 1996 16	Napoli	1–0	Lazio	Naples
	Di Napoli 25'			Stadium: San Paolo

14 January 1996 17	Udinese	3–2	Napoli	Naples
	Bertotto 11'; Poggi 53'; Bia 60'		Agostini 13'; Pecchia 56'	Stadium: San Paolo

21 January 1996 18	Napoli	1–0	Bari	Naples
	Di Napoli 7'			Stadium: San Paolo

28 January 1996 19	Padova	4–2	Napoli
	Vlaović 6, 67'; Amoruso 49'; Fiore 85'		Pizzi 54'; Di Napoli 87'

4 February 1996 20	Napoli	2–0	Atalanta	Naples
	Boghossian 14'; A. Paganin 85' (o.g.)			Stadium: San Paolo

11 February 1996 21	Inter Milan	4–0	Napoli
	Ganz 32' 57' (pen.); Branca 67, 80'

18 February 1996 22	Napoli	0–1	Juventus	Naples
			Ravanelli 81'	Stadium: San Paolo

25 February 1996 23	Fiorentina	3–0	Napoli
	Batistuta 36, 76'; Baiano 79'

3 March 1996 24	Napoli	0–0	Piacenza	Naples
				Stadium: San Paolo

10 March 1996 25	Cremonese	1–1	Napoli
	Tentoni 22'		Buso 5'

24 March 1996 26	Napoli	1–0	Torino	Naples
	Boghossian 30'			Stadium: San Paolo

31 March 1996 27	Vicenza	3–0	Napoli
	Di Carlo 13'; Murgita 21'; Ambrosetti 35'

6 April 1996 28	Napoli	0–0	Cagliari	Naples
				Stadium: San Paolo

10 April 1996 29	Parma	1–0	Napoli
	Apolloni 13'

14 April 1996 30	Napoli	0–1	Milan	Naples
			Panucci 13'	Stadium: San Paolo

20 April 1996 31	Roma	4–1	Napoli
	Delvecchio 43, 81, 85'; André Cruz 50' (o.g.)		Pecchia 72'

28 April 1996 32	Napoli	1–0	Sampdoria	Naples
	Di Napoli 86' (pen.)			Stadium: San Paolo

5 May 1996 33	Lazio	1–0	Napoli
	Di Matteo 19'

12 May 1996 34	Napoli	2–1	Udinese	Naples
	Pizzi 41' (pen.); Policano 71'		Pecchia 28' (o.g.)	Stadium: San Paolo

=== Coppa Italia ===
==== Second round ====
31 August 1995	US Lecce	1–0	Napoli	Lecce
	Palmieri 69'			Stadium: Via del Mare; Referee: Emilio Pellegrino

== Statistics ==
=== Players statistics ===
No.	Pos	Nat	Player	Total		Serie A		Coppa	
No.	Pos	Nat	Player	Apps	Goals	Apps	Goals	Apps	Goals
1	GK	(Italy) ITA	Giuseppe Taglialatela	35	-42	34	-41	1	-1
15	DF	(Italy) ITA	Francesco Baldini	27	0	20+7	0		
2	DF	(Argentina) ARG	Roberto Ayala	30	0	28+1	0	1	0
5	DF	(Brazil) BRA	André Cruz	30	1	29	1	1	0
3	DF	(Italy) ITA	Massimo Tarantino	27	0	26	0	1	0
10	MF	(Italy) ITA	Fausto Pizzi	33	3	32	3	1	0
4	MF	(Italy) ITA	Roberto Bordin	30	0	29	0	1	0
14	MF	(Italy) ITA	Fausto Pari	32	0	31	0	1	0
11	MF	(Italy) ITA	Fabio Pecchia	29	4	27+1	4	1	0
7	FW	(Italy) ITA	Renato Buso	32	4	32	4		
9	FW	(Italy) ITA	Massimo Agostini	31	4	30	4	1	0
12	GK	(Italy) ITA	Raffaele Di Fusco	0	0	0	0	0	0
19	FW	(Italy) ITA	Carmelo Imbriani	26	2	17+8	2	1	0
8	MF	(France) FRA	Alain Boghossian	24	2	15+8	2	1	0
20	FW	(Italy) ITA	Arturo Di Napoli	28	5	8+19	5	1	0
16	DF	(Italy) ITA	Francesco Colonnese	16	0	7+9	0		
18	MF	(Italy) ITA	Raffaele Longo	12	0	4+8	0		
25	DF	(Italy) ITA	Mirko Taccola	5	0	3+2	0		
21	MF	(Italy) ITA	Roberto Policano	17	1	2+15	1		
24	MF	(Italy) ITA	Luca Altomare	2	0	0+2	0		
6	DF	(Italy) ITA	Salvatore Matrecano	1	0	0+1	0		
26	DF	(Italy) ITA	Ciro Caruso	1	0	0+1	0		
13	DF	(Italy) ITA	Alessandro Sbrizzo	0	0	0	0		
22	GK	(Italy) ITA	Federico Infanti	0	0	0	0		

- Source: http://calcio-seriea.net/rose/1995/1091/

== Sources ==
- RSSSF - Italy 1995/96
