= 1993–94 SSC Napoli season =

Napoli
1993–94 season
- Owner: Corrado Ferlaino
- President: Ellenio Gallo
- Manager: Marcello Lippi
- Stadium: San Paolo
- Serie A: 6th (in 1994–95 UEFA Cup)
- Coppa Italia: Second round
- Top goalscorer: League: Daniel Fonseca (15); All: Daniel Fonseca (15)
Home colours	Away colours	Third colours

During the 1993–94 season, SSC Napoli competed in Serie A and Coppa Italia.

== Summary ==
In summer the club owner Corrado Ferlaino announced Ellenio Gallo as its new president, promoted Ottavio Bianchi as club manager and appointed Marcello Lippi as its new Head coach. SSC Napoli once again struggled to reach the levels it had achieved previously, but still finished sixth in Serie A, which ended up with coach Marcello Lippi joining Juventus and manager Ottavio Bianchi appointed as new coach by Inter Milan. Financial woes caused Napoli to sell its two prominent foreign players, Jonas Thern and Daniel Fonseca to Roma following the season's end.Skipper Ciro Ferrara also left, in his case for Juventus.

== Squad ==
Note: Flags indicate national team as defined under FIFA eligibility rules; some limited exceptions apply. Players may hold more than one non-FIFA nationality.

Pos.	Nation	Player
GK	ITA	Giuseppe Taglialatela
GK	ITA	Raffaele Di Fusco
GK	ITA	Angelo Pagotto
DF	ITA	Ciro Ferrara
DF	ITA	Giovanni Francini
DF	ITA	Fabio Cannavaro
DF	ITA	Giancarlo Corradini
DF	ITA	Massimo Tarantino
DF	ITA	Carlo Cornacchia
DF	ITA	Sebastiano Nela
DF	ITA	Ciro Caruso
DF	ITA	Alessandro Sbrizzo
DF	ITA	Giovanni Bia
DF	ITA	Enzo Gambaro

Pos.	Nation	Player
MF	SWE	Jonas Thern
MF	ITA	Fausto Pari
MF	ITA	Roberto Policano
MF	ITA	Fabio Pecchia
MF	ITA	Renato Buso
MF	ITA	Eugenio Corini
MF	ITA	Mario Caruso
MF	ITA	Roberto Bordin
MF	ITA	Luca Altomare
MF	ITA	Carmelo Imbriani
FW	ITA	Paolo Di Canio
FW	URU	Daniel Fonseca
FW	ITA	Giorgio Bresciani

=== Transfers ===
In
Pos.	Name	from	Type
FW	Paolo Di Canio	Juventus FC	
MF	Fabio Pecchia	US Avellino	
DF	Giovanni Bia	Cosenza Calcio	
DF	Enzo Gambaro	AC Milan	loan
MF	Renato Buso	Sampdoria	
MF	Eugenio Corini	Sampdoria	loan
MF	Roberto Bordin	Atalanta BC	
MF	Mario Caruso	Modena	
DF	Laurent Blanc	Nîmes Olympique	loan ended

Out
Pos.	Name	To	Type
FW	Gianfranco Zola	Parma FC	
MF	Massimo Crippa	Parma FC	
FW	Careca	Kashiwa Reysol	
MF	Angelo Carbone	AC Milan	
MF	Massimo Mauro		retired
GK	Giovanni Galli	Torino	
DF	Paolo Ziliani	Brescia Calcio	loan ended
DF	Laurent Blanc	AS Saint-Étienne	

==== Winter ====
In
Pos.	Name	from	Type
FW	Carmelo Imbriani		

Out
Pos.	Name	To	Type
MF	Luca Altomare	Lucchesse	

== Competitions ==
=== Serie A ===
==== League table ====
Pos	Team	Pld	W	D	L	GF	GA	GD	Pts	Qualification or relegation
4	Sampdoria	34	18	8	8	64	39	+25	44	Qualification to Cup Winners' Cup
5	Parma	34	17	7	10	50	35	+15	41	Qualification to UEFA Cup
6	Napoli	34	12	12	10	41	35	+6	36	Qualification to UEFA Cup
7	Roma	34	10	15	9	35	30	+5	35	
8	Torino	34	11	12	11	39	37	+2	34	

Source: 1993–94 Serie A, RSSSF.com, Soccerway
Rules for classification: 1) Points; 2) Head-to-head points; 3) Head-to-head goal difference; 4) Goal difference; 5) Goals scored; 6) Draw. (Note: Head-to-head record is used only after all the matches between the teams in question have been played).

==== Results by round ====
Round	1	2	3	4	5	6	7	8	9	10	11	12	13	14	15	16	17	18	19	20	21	22	23	24	25	26	27	28	29	30	31	32	33	34
Ground	H	A	H	A	A	H	H	A	H	A	H	A	A	A	H	A	H	A	H	A	H	H	A	A	H	A	H	A	H	A	H	A	H	A
Result	L	L	D	W	D	W	D	W	W	D	L	L	W	L	W	W	D	L	W	D	D	D	L	D	L	W	D	L	W	L	D	D	W	W
Position	11	15	14	11	12	8	8	7	6	6	8	10	8	10	8	7	7	8	7	7	7	7	7	7	8	7	7	7	6	7	7	7	6	6

Source: Competitive matches
A = Away; H = Home; W = Win; D = Draw; L = Loss; = Leader, 1994–95 UEFA Champions League; = 1994–95 UEFA Cup; = 1994–95 Serie B; c = As Sampdoria clinched the Coppa and qualified to the UEFA Cup Winners' Cup, therefore, the 6th spot qualified to the 1994–95 UEFA Cup.

==== Matches ====
29 August 1993 1	Napoli	1–2	Sampdoria	Naples
	Bresciani 81'	Report	Platt 31'; Gullit 43'	Stadium: San Paolo

5 September 1993 2	Cremonese	2–0	Napoli	Cremona
	Tentoni 38, 78'	Report

8 September 1993 3	Napoli	0–0	Torino	Naples
		Report		Stadium: San Paolo

12 September 1993 4	Roma	2–3	Napoli	Rome
	Rizzitelli 45'; Bonacina 54'	Report	Buso 25'; Di Canio 51'; Ferrara 67'	Stadium: Olimpico

19 September 1993 5	Genoa	0–0	Napoli	Genoa
		Report

26 September 1993 6	Napoli	2–1	Udinese	Naples
	Altomare 12'; Bia 68'	Report	Branca 40'	Stadium: San Paolo

3 October 1993 7	Napoli	0–0	Inter	Naples
		Report		Stadium: San Paolo

17 October 1993 8	Cagliari	1–2	Napoli	Cagliari
	Cappioli 37'	Report	Fonseca 25, 28'

24 October 1993 9	Napoli	3–1	Lecce	Naples
	Fonseca 27'; Policano 76'; Pecchia 82'	Report	Padalino 32'	Stadium: San Paolo

31 October 1993 10	Piacenza	1–1	Napoli	Piacenza
	Papais 28'	Report	Bia 18'

7 November 1993 11	Napoli	1–2	Lazio	Naples
	Fonseca 70'	Report	Favalli 68'; Signori 82' (pen.)	Stadium: San Paolo

21 November 1993 12	Milan	2–1	Napoli	Milan
	Panucci 61'; Albertini 90'	Report	Pecchia 45'

28 November 1993 13	Napoli	5–0	Reggiana	Naples
	Fonseca 3, 20, 83'; Di Canio 85'; Buso 90'	Report		Stadium: San Paolo

5 December 1993 14	Juventus	1–0	Napoli	Turin
	Ferrara 28' (o.g.)	Report		Stadium: delle Alpi

12 December 1993 15	Napoli	4–0	Atalanta	Naples
	Valentini 52' (o.g.); Policano 60, 75'; Pecchia 67'	Report		Stadium: San Paolo

19 December 1993 16	Parma	1–3	Napoli	Parma
	Brolin 33' (pen.)	Report	Gambaro 3'; Fonseca 60'; Thern 82'	Stadium: Ennio Tardini

2 January 1994 17	Napoli	1–1	Foggia	Naples
	Bia 50'	Report	Roy 25'	Stadium: San Paolo

9 January 1994 18	Sampdoria	4–1	Napoli	Genoa
	Lombardo 34'; Gullit 52'; Mancini 85, 90'	Report	Fonseca 51'	Stadium: Luigi Ferraris

16 January 1994 19	Napoli	2–1	Cremonese	Naples
	Fonseca 4' 12' (pen.)	Report	Gualco 80'	Stadium: San Paolo

23 January 1994 20	Torino	1–1	Napoli	Turin
	Carbone 51'	Report	Fonseca 70' (pen.)	Stadium: delle Alpi

30 January 1994 21	Napoli	1–1	Roma	Naples
	Fonseca 90' (pen.)	Report	Balbo 58'	Stadium: San Paolo

6 February 1994 22	Napoli	1–1	Genoa	Naples
	Di Canio 72' (pen.)	Report	van 't Schip 45'	Stadium: San Paolo

13 February 1994 23	Udinese	3–1	Napoli	Udine
	Branca 64, 85'; Calori 66'	Report	Pecchia 63'	Stadium: Friuli

20 February 1994 24	Inter	0–0	Napoli	Milan
		Report		Stadium: Giuseppe Meazza

27 February 1994 25	Napoli	1–2	Cagliari	Naples
	Fonseca 58' (pen.)	Report	L. Oliveira 15, 81'	Stadium: San Paolo

6 March 1994 26	Lecce	0–1	Napoli	Lecce
		Report	Fonseca 51'	Stadium: Via del Mare

13 March 1994 27	Napoli	0–0	Piacenza	Naples
		Report		Stadium: San Paolo

20 March 1994 28	Lazio	3–0	Napoli	Rome
	Di Mauro 29'; Signori 53'; Bia 54' (o.g.)	Report		Stadium: Olimpico

27 March 1994 29	Napoli	1–0	Milan	Naples
	Di Canio 79'	Report		Stadium: San Paolo

2 April 1994 30	Reggiana	1–0	Napoli	Reggio Emilia
	Padovano 69' (pen.)	Report

9 April 1994 31	Napoli	0–0	Juventus	Naples
		Report		Stadium: San Paolo

17 April 1994 32	Atalanta	1–1	Napoli	Bergamo
	Morfeo 8'	Report	Buso 15'

23 April 1994 33	Napoli	2–0	Parma	Naples
	Buso 20'; Ferrara 45'	Report		Stadium: San Paolo

1 May 1994 34	Foggia	0–1	Napoli	Foggia
		Report	Di Canio 61'	Stadium: Stadio Pino Zaccheria

=== Coppa Italia ===
Second round

6 October 1993	Napoli	0–0	Ancona	Naples
				Stadium: Stadio San Paolo; Referee: Dinelli

27 October 1993	Ancona	3–2 (3–2 agg.)	Napoli	Ancona
	Gadda 12'; Agostini 21', 61'		71' Caruso; 86' (o.g.) Mazzarano	Stadium: Stadio Del Conero; Referee: Nicchi

== Other tournaments ==
=== Carlos Menem Trophy ===
10 May 1994 Semifinals	Independiente (Argentina)	3–2	Napoli	Buenos Aires, Argentina
	Gareca 9'; Vidal 36'; Cagna 78' (pen.)	Report	Bresciani 5'; Bia (red card) 71'; Di Canio 75'	Stadium: José Amalfitani Stadium; Referee: Ángel Sánchez (Argentina)

12 May 1994 Third place match	River Plate (Argentina)	4–0	Napoli	Mar del Plata, Argentina
	Facundo Villalba 7', 27', 90'; Gamboa (red card) 58'; Cedrés 77'	Report	Di Canio (red card) 38'; Ferrara (red card) 46'	Stadium: Estadio José María Minella; Referee: Horacio Elizondo (Argentina)

== Statistics ==
=== Players statistics ===
No.	Pos	Nat	Player	Total		1993-94 Serie A		1993-94 Coppa Italia	
No.	Pos	Nat	Player	Apps	Goals	Apps	Goals	Apps	Goals
	GK	(Italy) ITA	Taglialatela	29	-27	29	-27		
	DF	(Italy) ITA	Ciro Ferrara	28	2	28	2		
	DF	(Italy) ITA	Fabio Cannavaro	29	0	27	0	2	0
	DF	(Italy) ITA	Giovanni Bia	30	3	28	3	2	0
	DF	(Italy) ITA	Enzo Gambaro	35	1	33	1	2	0
	MF	(Italy) ITA	Fabio Pecchia	34	4	31+2	4	1	0
	MF	(Sweden) SWE	Jonas Thern	21	1	20+1	1		
	MF	(Italy) ITA	Roberto Bordin	33	0	32	0	1	0
	MF	(Italy) ITA	Renato Buso	33	4	22+9	4	2	0
	FW	(Italy) ITA	Paolo Di Canio	27	5	26	5	1	0
	FW	(Uruguay) URU	Daniel Fonseca	29	15	27	15	2	0
	GK	(Italy) ITA	Raffaele Di Fusco	9	-11	5+2	-8	2	-3
	DF	(Italy) ITA	Giovanni Francini	22	0	20+1	0	1	0
	DF	(Italy) ITA	Giancarlo Corradini	23	0	12+10	0	1	0
	MF	(Italy) ITA	Eugenio Corini	14	0	12+2	0		
	MF	(Italy) ITA	Roberto Policano	21	3	8+11	3	2	0
	DF	(Italy) ITA	Sebastiano Nela	13	0	6+5	0	2	0
	FW	(Italy) ITA	Giorgio Bresciani	12	1	4+7	1	1	0
	MF	(Italy) ITA	Fausto Pari	5	0	3+2	0		
	MF	(Italy) ITA	Luca Altomare	6	1	1+3	1	2	0
	MF	(Italy) ITA	Mario Caruso	6	1	0+4	0	2	1
	DF	(Italy) ITA	Massimo Tarantino	2	0	0+2	0		
	DF	(Italy) ITA	Alessandro Sbrizzo	1	0	0+1	0		
	FW	(Italy) ITA	Carmelo Imbriani	1	0	0+1	0		
	GK	(Italy) ITA	Angelo Pagotto	0	0	0	0	0	0
	DF	(Italy) ITA	Ciro Caruso	0	0	0	0		
	DF	(Italy) ITA	Carlo Cornacchia						

- Source: http://calcio-seriea.net/allenatori_squadra/1993/1064/

== Sources ==
- RSSSF - Italy 1993/94
