= 1992–93 SSC Napoli season =

Napoli
1992-93 season
- Owner: Corrado Ferlaino
- President: Corrado Ferlaino
- Head coach: Claudio Ranieri (until 9 November 1992); Ottavio Bianchi
- Serie A: 11th
- Coppa Italia: Quarter-finals
- UEFA Cup: Second round
- Top goalscorer: League: Daniel Fonseca (16); All: Fonseca (24)
Home colours	Away colours	Third colours

SSC Napoli got extremely close to a shock relegation to Serie B, and only held on to its top-flight status by two points. This was just three years since the club led by playmaker and legend Diego Maradona won the domestic league title. It actually spent Christmas of 1992 in the relegation zone, and climbed out of it thanks to a strong January '93 run. The reason Napoli survived was the above-average offensive skills. Gianfranco Zola, Daniel Fonseca and Careca was a trio capable of leading any teams' attack, and the club looked set to suffer when Zola (Parma) and Careca (Japan) departed at the end of the season. Fonseca's season is mostly remembered for an extremely unusual five goals in one match, as Napoli beat Valencia 5-1 away from home in the UEFA Cup. Then it lost to Paris SG in the next round, rendering it was out of Europe.

== Squad ==
Note: Flags indicate national team as defined under FIFA eligibility rules; some limited exceptions apply. Players may hold more than one non-FIFA nationality.

Pos.	Nation	Player
GK	ITA	Giovanni Galli
GK	ITA	Gian Marco Sansonetti
DF	ITA	Ciro Ferrara
DF	ITA	Giovanni Francini
DF	ITA	Fabio Cannavaro
DF	ITA	Giancarlo Corradini
DF	ITA	Massimo Tarantino
DF	ITA	Carlo Cornacchia
DF	ITA	Sebastiano Nela
DF	ITA	Paolo Ziliani
MF	SWE	Jonas Thern

Pos.	Nation	Player
MF	ITA	Fausto Pari
MF	ITA	Roberto Policano
MF	ITA	Massimo Mauro
MF	ITA	Massimo Crippa
MF	ITA	Luca Altomare
MF	ITA	Gaetano De Rosa
MF	ITA	Angelo Carbone
FW	ITA	Gianfranco Zola
FW	URU	Daniel Fonseca
FW	BRA	Careca
FW	ITA	Cristian Baglieri
FW	ITA	Giorgio Bresciani

=== Transfers ===
In
Pos.	Name	from	Type
FW	Daniel Fonseca	Cagliari Calcio	
MF	Jonas Thern	Benfica	
DF	Paolo Ziliani	Brescia Calcio	loan
MF	Fausto Pari	Sampdoria	
MF	Roberto Policano	Torino	
MF	Luca Altomare	AC Reggiana	
MF	Angelo Carbone	AS Bari	
FW	Marco Ferrante	Pisa	loan ended
DF	Carlo Cornacchia	Atalanta BC	

Out
Pos.	Name	To	Type
FW	Diego Maradona	Sevilla FC	U$7,50 million
DF	Laurent Blanc	Nîmes Olympique	loan
MF	Alemão	Atalanta BC	
FW	Michele Padovano	Genoa CFC	
FW	Andrea Silenzi	Torino	
MF	Fernando De Napoli	AC Milan	
MF	Stefano De Agostini	Atalanta BC	

==== Winter ====
In
Pos.	Name	from	Type
DF	Sebastiano Nela	A.S. Roma	
FW	Giorgio Bresciani	Cagliari Calcio	

Out
Pos.	Name	To	Type
FW	Marco Ferrante	Parma F.C.	

== Competitions ==
=== Serie A ===
==== League table ====
Pos	Team	Pld	W	D	L	GF	GA	GD	Pts	Qualification or relegation
9	Torino	34	9	17	8	38	38	0	35	Qualification to Cup Winners' Cup
10	Roma	34	8	17	9	42	39	+3	33	
11	Napoli	34	10	12	12	49	50	−1	32	
12	Foggia	34	10	12	12	39	55	−16	32	
13	Genoa	34	7	17	10	41	55	−14	31	

Source: 1992–93 Serie A, RSSSF.com
Rules for classification: 1) Points; 2) Head-to-head points; 3) Head-to-head goal difference; 4) Goal difference; 5) Goals scored; 6) Draw.(Note:

==== Results by round ====
Round	1	2	3	4	5	6	7	8	9	10	11	12	13	14	15	16	17	18	19	20	21	22	23	24	25	26	27	28	29	30	31	32	33	34
Ground	A	H	A	H	H	A	H	A	H	A	H	A	H	A	H	A	H	H	A	H	A	A	H	A	H	A	H	A	H	A	H	A	H	A
Result	D	W	L	D	L	L	W	L	L	L	W	L	L	W	W	W	D	L	W	D	D	L	W	D	W	D	D	D	W	D	L	D	L	D
Position	6	2	8	7	10	14	10	13	14	16	16	16	16	16	15	12	12	15	11	11	11	12	11	11	11	11	11	11	10	10	10	10	12	11

Source: Competitive matches
A = Away; H = Home; W = Win; D = Draw; L = Loss; = 1992–93 European Cup; = 1992–93 UEFA Cup; = 1992–93 Serie B

==== Matches ====
6 September 1992 1	Napoli	0–0	Brescia	Naples
		Report		Stadium: San Paolo

13 September 1992 2	Foggia	2–4	Napoli	Foggia
	P. Bresciani 17, 44'	Report	Fonseca 11, 89'; Zola 25'; Careca 59'

20 September 1992 3	Napoli	1–2	Inter Milan	Naples
	Fonseca 84'	Report	Sammer 54'; Schillaci 57'	Stadium: San Paolo

27 September 1992 4	Ancona	1–1	Napoli	Ancona
	Détári 60'	Report	Fonseca 5'

4 October 1992 5	Napoli	2–3	Juventus	Naples
	Fonseca 84'; Zola 86'	Report	R. Baggio 5'; Möller 57'; Vialli 80'	Stadium: San Paolo

18 October 1992 6	Udinese	2–0	Napoli	Udine
	Branca 11'; Dell'Anno 49'	Report

25 October 1992 7	Napoli	2–1	Roma	Naples
	Fonseca 45'; Careca 46'	Report	Benedetti 57'	Stadium: San Paolo

1 November 1992 8	Atalanta	3–2	Napoli	Bergamo
	Perrone 21'; Ganz 52, 75'	Report	Fonseca 7'; Ferrara 90'

8 November 1992 9	Napoli	1–5	Milan	Naples
	Zola 83'	Report	van Basten 6, 26, 68, 74'; Eranio 60'	Stadium: San Paolo

22 November 1992 10	Sampdoria	3–1	Napoli	Genoa
	Ziliani 42' (o.g.); Jugović 59'; Mancini 77'	Report	Mannini 87' (o.g.)

29 November 1992 11	Napoli	4–1	Fiorentina	Naples
	Policano 19'; Zola 43, 67'; Careca 90'	Report	Di Mauro 14'	Stadium: San Paolo

6 December 1992 12	Cagliari	1–0	Napoli	Cagliari
	Francescoli 64'	Report	(red card) 55' Fonseca; (red card) 59' Careca

13 December 1992 13	Genoa	2–1	Napoli	Genoa
	Skuhravý 30, 79'	Report	Fonseca 47'

3 January 1993 14	Napoli	2–0	Pescara	Naples
	Fonseca 16, 67'	Report		Stadium: San Paolo

10 January 1993 15	Torino	0–1	Napoli	Turin
		Report	Policano 13'	Stadium: delle Alpi

17 January 1993 16	Napoli	3–1	Lazio	Naples
	Crippa 29'; Fonseca 59'; Careca 70'	Report	Signori 78'	Stadium: San Paolo

24 January 1993 17	Parma	1–1	Napoli	Parma
	Asprilla 51'	Report	Fonseca 69'	Stadium: Ennio Tardini

31 January 1993 18	Brescia	2–1	Napoli	Brescia
	Schenardi 55'; Răducioiu 69'	Report	Zola 75'	Stadium: Mario Rigamonti

7 February 1993 19	Napoli	2–0	Foggia	Naples
	Zola 20'; Careca 29'	Report		Stadium: San Paolo

14 February 1993 20	Inter Milan	0–0	Napoli	Milan
		Report		Stadium: Giuseppe Meazza

28 February 1993 21	Napoli	0–0	Ancona	Naples
		Report		Stadium: San Paolo

7 March 1993 22	Juventus	4–3	Napoli	Turin
	Di Canio 9'; Platt 16'; Ravanelli 72'; Möller 87'	Report	Zola 51'; Ferrara 71'; Ferrara (red card) 74'; 77' Careca; Fonseca 80' (pen.)	Stadium: delle Alpi

14 March 1993 23	Napoli	3–0	Udinese	Naples
	Ferrara 45'; Policano 53'; Fonseca 71'	Report		Stadium: San Paolo

21 March 1993 24	Roma	1–1	Napoli	Rome
	Häßler 58'	Report	Fonseca 74'	Stadium: Olimpico

28 March 1993 25	Napoli	1–0	Atalanta	Naples
	Policano 20'	Report		Stadium: San Paolo

4 April 1993 26	Milan	2–2	Napoli	Milan
	Lentini 62, 66'	Report	Careca 15'; Policano 37'	Stadium: San Siro

10 April 1993 27	Napoli	1–1	Sampdoria	Naples
	Zola 13'	Report	Lombardo 26'	Stadium: San Paolo

18 April 1993 28	Fiorentina	1–1	Napoli	Florence
	Batistuta 86'	Report	Fonseca 25'	Stadium: Artemio Franchi

25 April 1993 29	Napoli	1–0	Cagliari	Naples
	Zola 88'	Report		Stadium: San Paolo

8 May 1993 30	Napoli	2–2	Genoa	Naples
	Careca 11'; Ferrara 38'	Report	Caricola 41'; Padovano 55'	Stadium: San Paolo

16 May 1993 31	Pescara	3–0	Napoli	Pescara
	Palladini 52'; Borgonovo 74, 88'	Report		Stadium: Adriatico

23 May 1993 32	Napoli	1–1	Torino	Naples
	Policano 60'	Report	Poggi 81'	Stadium: San Paolo

30 May 1993 33	Lazio	4–3	Napoli	Rome
	Riedle 1, 4'; Signori 42' (pen.); Winter 50'	Report	Zola 10' 61' (pen.); Francini 47'	Stadium: Olimpico

6 June 1993 34	Napoli	1–1	Parma	Naples
	Policano 22'	Report	Pizzi 87'	Stadium: San Paolo

=== Coppa Italia ===
Second round

26 August 1992	Napoli	3–0	Modena	Naples

2 September 1992	Modena	0–3	Napoli	Modena

Eightfinals

7 October 1992	Napoli	2–1	Hellas Verona	Naples
				Stadium: San Paolo

28 October 1992	Hellas Verona	1–5	Napoli	Verona
				Stadium: Marcantonio Bentegodi

==== Quarter-finals ====
27 January 1993	Napoli	0–0	Roma	Naples
				Stadium: Stadio San Paolo; Referee: Luciano Luci

9 February 1993	Roma	2–0 (2–0 agg.)	Napoli	Rome
	Carnevale 10'; Häßler 71' (pen.)			Stadium: Olimpico; Referee: Pierluigi Collina

=== UEFA Cup ===
==== First round ====
16 September 1992	Valencia (Spain)	1–5	(Italy) Napoli	Valencia
	Roberto 54'	Report	Fonseca 20'; Fonseca 60'; Fonseca 63'; Fonseca 87'; Fonseca 89'	Stadium: Luis Casanova Stadium; Attendance: 30,000; Referee: (Austria) Hubert Forstinger

30 September 1992	Napoli (Italy)	1–0	(Spain) Valencia	Naples
	Fonseca 7'	Report		Stadium: San Paolo; Attendance: 25,000; Referee: (Sweden) Bo Karlsson

==== Second round ====
21 October 1992	Napoli (Italy)	0–2	(France) Paris Saint-Germain	Naples
20:30		Report	Weah 16', 35'	Stadium: San Paolo; Attendance: 35,378; Referee: (Germany) Karl-Josef Assenmacher

4 November 1992	Paris Saint-Germain (France)	0–0 (2–0 agg.)	(Italy) Napoli	Paris
		Report		Stadium: Parc des Princes

== Statistics ==
=== Players statistics ===
No.	Pos	Nat	Player	Total		Serie A		Coppa		UEFA	
No.	Pos	Nat	Player	Apps	Goals	Apps	Goals	Apps	Goals	Apps	Goals
	GK	(Italy) ITA	Giovanni Galli	42	-55	32	-49	6	-3	4	-3
	DF	(Italy) ITA	Sebastiano Nela	25	0	23	0	2	0		
	DF	(Italy) ITA	Ciro Ferrara	39	4	31	4	5	0	3	0
	DF	(Italy) ITA	Giancarlo Corradini	38	0	26+5	0	3	0	4	0
	DF	(Italy) ITA	Giovanni Francini	35	2	24+1	1	6	1	4	0
	MF	(Italy) ITA	Massimo Crippa	38	1	25+4	1	5	0	4	0
	MF	(Sweden) SWE	Jonas Thern	34	0	27	0	3	0	4	0
	MF	(Italy) ITA	Roberto Policano	38	10	27+3	7	6	3	2	0
	FW	(Uruguay) URU	Daniel Fonseca	40	24	30+1	16	5	2	4	6
	FW	(Brazil) BRA	Careca	31	10	23+1	7	3	3	4	0
	FW	(Italy) ITA	Gianfranco Zola	43	14	33	12	6	2	4	0
	GK	(Italy) ITA	Gian Marco Sansonetti	2	-1	2	-1	0	0	0	0
	MF	(Italy) ITA	Angelo Carbone	34	0	21+6	0	4	0	3	0
	DF	(Italy) ITA	Massimo Tarantino	36	0	18+12	0	3	0	3	0
	MF	(Italy) ITA	Fausto Pari	20	0	10+3	0	3	0	4	0
	MF	(Italy) ITA	Luca Altomare	17	0	10+4	0	3	0		
	FW	(Italy) ITA	Giorgio Bresciani	12	0	3+8	0	1	0		
	MF	(Italy) ITA	Massimo Mauro	16	0	3+7	0	3	0	3	0
	FW	(Italy) ITA	Marco Ferrante	7	2	2+2	0	3	2		
	DF	(Italy) ITA	Fabio Cannavaro	3	0	2	0	1	0		
	DF	(Italy) ITA	Paolo Ziliani	2	0	1+1	0				
	FW	(Italy) ITA	Cristian Baglieri	2	0	1	0	1	0		
	DF	(Italy) ITA	Carlo Cornacchia	6	0	0+3	0	2	0	1	0
	MF	(Italy) ITA	Gaetano De Rosa	3	0	0+3	0				
	GK	(Italy) ITA	Angelo Pagotto	0	0	0	0				
	GK	(Italy) ITA	Giuseppe Taglialatela	0	0	0	0				
	FW	(Italy) ITA	Carli	0	0	0	0				

- Source: http://calcio-seriea.net/allenatori_squadra/1992/1042/

== Sources ==
- RSSSF - Italy 1992/93
