= Jean Mbida =

Cameroonian footballer

Personal information
- Full name: Jean Bindzi Ebila Mbida
- Date of birth: 9 April 1990 (age 36)
- Place of birth: Yaoundé, Cameroon
- Height: 1.76 m (5 ft 9 in)
- Position: Left-back

Team information
- Current team: Albignasego

Youth career
- 2005–2008: Vicenza
- 2008–2010: Inter Milan

Senior career*
Years	Team	Apps	(Gls)
2009–2010	Inter Milan	0	(0)
2009–2010	→ Como (loan)	7	(0)
2010–2012	Vicenza	0	(0)
2010–2011	→ Savona (loan)	25	(0)
2012–2014	Catania	0	(0)
2012–2013	→ Gorica (loan)	19	(1)
2014	Thermal Abano		
2014	Terracina	11	(0)
2014–2015	Gallipoli	25	(0)
2015–2016	Taranto	16	(0)
2016	Nardò	15	(0)
2016–2020	FBC Gravina	95	(7)
2020–2021	Campodarsego	5	(0)
2021–	Albignasego	43	(2)
- * Club domestic league appearances and goals as of 17:41, 13 November 2023 (UTC)

Jean Bindzi Ebila Mbida (born 9 April 1990) is a Cameroonian footballer who plays as a left-back for Albignasego.

== Career ==
Mbida began his career in 2005 in the Allievi regionali of Noventa padovana Calcio and signed after three years in 2008 for Inter Milan in a 5-year contract. Nicolas Giani also joined opposite direction that season; Giani valued €1,000, thus 50% rights worth €500, and Mbida's half valued €60,000. In July 2009 was loaned to Como Calcio but the loan was cancelled in January 2010.

In June 2010, he was bought back by Vicenza, made Inter register a loss of €71,000 (contract residual value €72,000 (€120,000 times three years/five years) minus €1,000) but also register a financial income of €59,500 (rounded to €60,000, book value of another half minus market value €500), which it only made a net loss of €11,500 to Inter.

In August 2010 he left for Savona.

On 1 July 2011, Mbida returned to Vicenza and awarded no.36 shirt. However, he did not play any game and hospitalized on 5 November 2011 due to high fever.

Mbida became a free agent on 1 July 2012 and did not train with Vicenza in pre-season. In late July 2012 Mbida was signed by Serie A club Calcio Catania, rejoining Alberto Frison, and the contract was documented by Lega Serie A on 2 August 2012.
