= Erik Panizzi =

Italian footballer (born 1994)

Personal information
- Date of birth: 15 February 1994 (age 32)
- Place of birth: Guastalla, Italy
- Height: 1.76 m (5 ft 9 in)
- Position: Defender

Team information
- Current team: Correggese

Youth career
- Reggiana

Senior career*
Years	Team	Apps	(Gls)
2011–2018	Reggiana	78	(1)
2013–2014	→ SPAL (loan)	1	(0)
2014	→ Vicenza (loan)	0	(0)
2014–2015	→ Pro Patria (loan)	10	(0)
2018–2019	Alessandria	24	(1)
2019–2020	Siena	16	(0)
2020–2025	Mantova	103	(1)
2025–	Correggese	17	(0)
- * Club domestic league appearances and goals as of 22 February 2026

Erik Panizzi (born 15 February 1994) is an Italian footballer who plays as a defender for Serie D club Correggese.

== Club career ==
=== Reggiana ===
Born in Guastalla, in the Province of Reggio Emilia, Panizzi started his career at Reggio Emilia for Reggiana. Panizzi made his debut during the 2011–12 Lega Pro Prima Divisione season. Panizzi signed a 3-year contract in January 2013.

=== SPAL ===
On 26 August 2013 Panizzi was sold to L.P. 2nd Division club SPAL in a co-ownership deal. On 9 January 2014 Nicolas Giani moved to SPAL, with Panizzi moved to L.P. Prime Division club Vicenza in a temporary deal. On 20 June 2014 Reggiana bought back Panizzi.

=== Pro Patria ===
On 31 July 2014 Panizzi was sold to fellow Lega Pro club Pro Patria in a definitive deal. However, on 2 February Reggiana bought back Panizzi, who remained in Busto Arsizio for Pro Patria for the rest of the 2014–15 Lega Pro season.

=== Siena ===
On 30 August 2019, he joined Siena on a one-year contract.

=== Mantova ===
On 14 August 2020 he moved to Mantova. He contributed to Mantova's promotion to Serie B for the 2024–25 season and made his second-tier debut for the club in August 2024.

On 25 August 2025, Panizzi's contract with Mantova was terminated by mutual consent.

== International career ==
=== Representative teams ===
Panizzi was a member of Italy Lega Pro representative teams for the 2012–13 Under 20 Regional Competition (appearing twice against Slovenia) and in the 2013–15 International Challenge Trophy (against Ukraine). Panizzi also played in the representative team's match against Oman in February 2013.
