= Nicolas Giani =

Italian footballer (1986–2026)

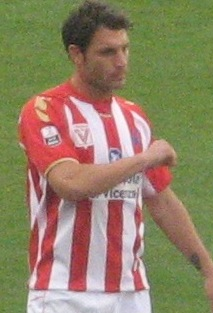
- Giani in 2012

Personal information
- Full name: Nicolas Devis Giani
- Date of birth: 13 March 1986
- Place of birth: Como, Italy
- Date of death: 2 February 2026 (aged 39)
- Place of death: Desenzano del Garda, Italy
- Height: 1.81 m (5 ft 11 in)
- Position: Centre-back

Youth career
- 2004–2005: Inter Milan

Senior career*
Years	Team	Apps	(Gls)
2005–2008	Inter Milan	0	(0)
2005–2006	→ Cremonese (loan)	1	(0)
2006–2008	→ Pro Patria (loan)	61	(2)
2008–2014	Vicenza	101	(1)
2013	→ Perugia (loan)	6	(0)
2014–2017	SPAL	93	(8)
2017–2019	Spezia	45	(0)
2019–2021	FeralpiSalò	63	(3)
2021–2022	Desenzano Calvina	34	(2)

International career
2004	Italy U18	2	(0)
2005	Italy U19	5	(0)
- * Club domestic league appearances and goals

Nicolas Devis Giani (13 March 1986 – 2 February 2026) was an Italian professional footballer who played as a centre-back.

== Career ==
Giani started his career at Inter Milan. In August 2005, he was loaned to Serie B Cremonese, but later returned to Inter and played in the 2006 Torneo di Viareggio. He then played two Serie C1 seasons for Pro Patria. In July 2008, he joined Vicenza in a joint-ownership deal and Jean Mbida joined opposite direction. Giani was valued at €1,000, thus half of the rights were worth €500; Mbida was valued at €120,000, and the half was worth €60,000. Giani's co-ownership deal was renewed in June 2009, 2010 and 2011. In June 2012, Inter gave up the remaining 50% registration rights.

On 23 January 2013, Giani was signed by Perugia in a temporary deal.

On 9 January 2014, Giani was signed by SPAL, with Erik Panizzi moving in the opposite direction.

On 30 January 2019, he signed a 2.5-year contract with Serie C club FeralpiSalò.

On 9 August 2021, he joined Serie D club Desenzano Calvina.

== Death ==
Giani died on 2 February 2026, at the age of 39.

== Honours ==
SPAL

- Serie B: 2016–17
- Lega Pro: 2015–16
