= Damiano Longhi =

Italian footballer and manager (born 1966)

Personal information
- Date of birth: 27 September 1966 (age 60)
- Place of birth: Faenza, Italy
- Height: 1.70 m (5 ft 7 in)
- Position: Midfielder

Senior career*
Years	Team	Apps	(Gls)
1982–1987	Modena	77	(4)
1987–1996	Padova	264	(25)
1989–1990	→ Pescara (loan)	36	(0)
1996	Hércules CF	13	(0)
1997	Reggiana	13	(0)
1997–1998	Castel di Sangro	28	(9)
1998–2001	Treviso	26	(2)
2001–2002	Fiorenzuola	2	(0)

Managerial career
- 2007: Albignasego
- 2010–2011: Campodarsego
- 2012–2013: Campodarsego
- 2014–2015: Atletico San Paolo Padova
- * Club domestic league appearances and goals

Damiano Longhi (born 27 September 1966) is an Italian football manager and former player, who played as a midfielder.

== Career ==
He played for Modena, Padova, Pescara (on loan from Padova), Hércules CF, Reggiana, Castel di Sangro, Treviso and Fiorenzuola.
