= Roberto Ayala =

Argentine footballer (born 1973)

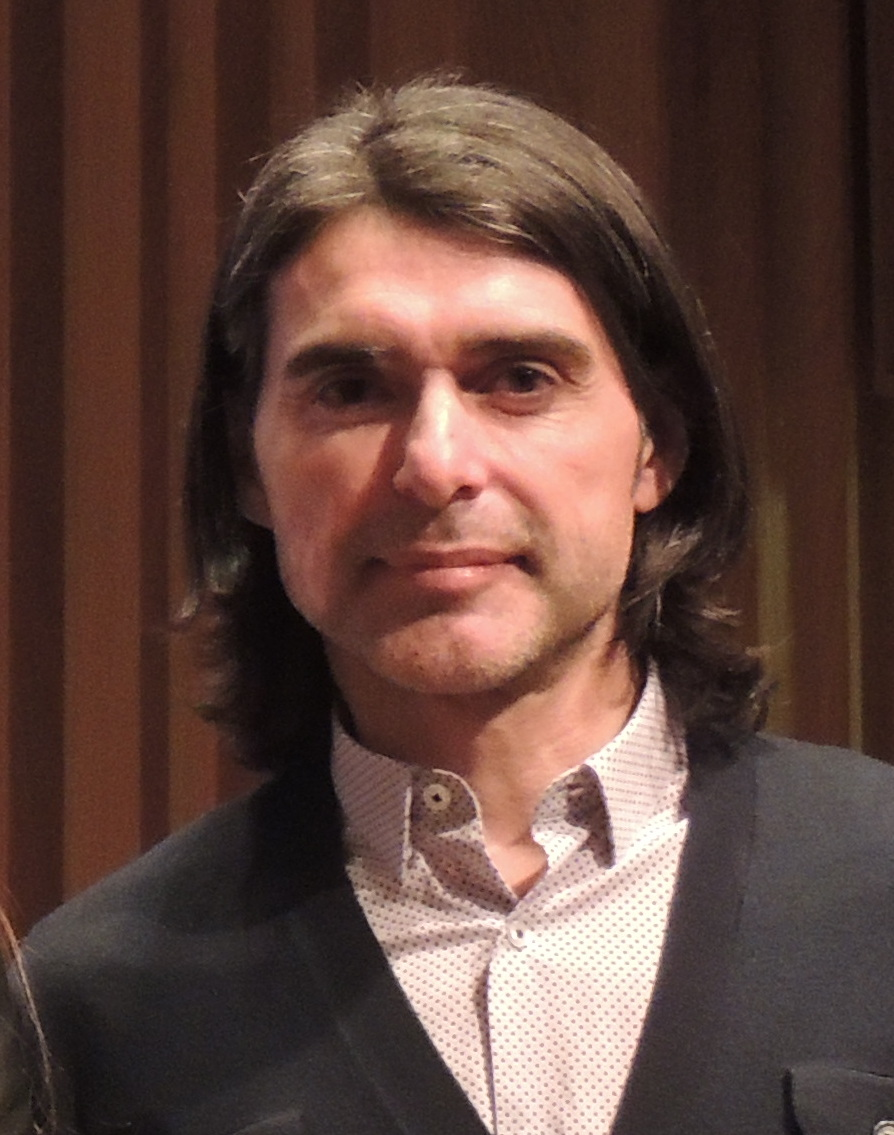
- Ayala in 2018

Personal information
- Full name: Roberto Fabián Ayala
- Date of birth: 14 April 1973 (age 53)
- Place of birth: Paraná, Argentina
- Height: 1.77 m (5 ft 10 in)
- Position: Centre-back

Team information
- Current team: Argentina (field assistant)

Youth career
- Ferro Carril Oeste

Senior career*
Years	Team	Apps	(Gls)
1991–1993	Ferro Carril Oeste	73	(1)
1993–1995	River Plate	41	(0)
1995–1998	Napoli	87	(1)
1998–2000	Milan	24	(0)
2000–2007	Valencia	187	(9)
2007–2010	Real Zaragoza	74	(4)
2010–2011	Racing Club	15	(0)
Total		501	(15)

International career
1996	Argentina U23	6	(0)
2004	Argentina Olympic (O.P.)	6	(0)
1994–2007	Argentina	116	(7)

Managerial career
- 2019–: Argentina (assistant)
Medal record
Men's Football
Representing Argentina (as player)
Olympic Games
Gold medal – first place	2004 Athens	Team
Silver medal – second place	1996 Atlanta	Team
Pan American Games
Gold medal – first place	1995 Mar del Plata	Team
Representing Argentina (as assistant manager)
FIFA World Cup
Winner	2022 Qatar
Copa América
Winner	2021 Brazil
Winner	2024 United States
Third place	2019 Brazil
CONMEBOL–UEFA Cup of Champions
Winner	2022 England
- * Club domestic league appearances and goals

Roberto Fabián Ayala ([roˈβeɾto faˈβjan aˈʝala]; born 14 April 1973), nicknamed El Ratón ("The Mouse"), is an Argentine former footballer who played as a centre-back for the Argentina national football team, as well as Valencia and Real Zaragoza in Spain, Milan and Napoli in Italy, and Ferro Carril, River Plate and Racing Club in his native Argentina.

Regarded as one of the best defenders of his generation, he stood out for his leadership and ability in the air throughout his career in spite of his small stature as a centre back. Ayala captained Argentina in a record 63 matches. He played in three FIFA World Cups and made a total of 115 international appearances.

== Club career ==
=== Early career in Argentina ===
Ayala began his career in his native Argentina, playing for Ferro Carril Oeste. After three seasons, he moved to River Plate where his good form attracted the attention of clubs in Europe.

=== Move to Europe ===
==== Parma, Napoli and Milan ====
Italian side Parma brought the Argentine defender to Europe. However, the club, having already used their quota of three non-EU players, loaned him to Napoli, who purchased 50% of his rights on a co-ownership deal. Ayala was bought by Milan at the end of the 1997–98 season and played there for two seasons until Valencia purchased him for £6.25 million.

==== Valencia ====
After signing with Valencia in the summer of 2000, Ayala made 275 appearances during a seven-year spell at the club. On 24 September 2000, Ayala made his debut for Valencia in a 3–0 La Liga win over Numancia. He soon established himself as a first choice central defender for Los Che and started alongside compatriot Mauricio Pellegrino in the 2001 UEFA Champions League final, where Valencia lost 5–4 to Bayern Munich after a penalty shootout. He was later named best defender for the 2000–01 tournament. The following season, Ayala was part of the Valencia team that won the 2001–02 La Liga title. He scored the opening goal of a 2–0 defeat of Málaga which secured the championship on 5 May 2002. In 2003–04, Valencia again won the La Liga title and beat Marseille 2–0 in Gothenburg to win the UEFA Cup. During the 2004–05 season, injuries kept Ayala from much of the La Liga campaign as well as the UEFA Super Cup victory over Porto. During his time with Valencia, he was widely regarded as one of the finest central defenders in the world and is considered to be one of the club's all-time legends.

==== Villarreal and Real Zaragoza ====
In August 2006, Ayala was not offered a new contract by sporting director Amedeo Carboni. On 7 February 2007, he announced he would join regional rivals Villarreal at the end of the season, however before having played for Villarreal, he joined Real Zaragoza on a three-year deal on 14 July 2007. The buy-out clause in his contract with Villarreal was €6 million (£4.8 million) which was paid in full by Real Zaragoza.

On 3 May 2008, Ayala scored his first goal for Real Zaragoza in the 94th minute against Deportivo de La Coruña to lead Zaragoza to a 1–0 victory. Zaragoza, however, were relegated to the Segunda División. On 22 November 2008, Ayala scored his second goal for Zaragoza, in the 73rd of a 3–0 win over Eibar. On 29 February 2009, he scored his third goal coming in the 54th minute against Real Murcia as Zaragoza won the match 4–1.

In January 2010, Ayala's contract with Zaragoza was terminated by mutual consent.

=== Racing Avellaneda ===
On 2 February 2010, Argentine side Racing Club signed Ayala on a free transfer.

== International career ==
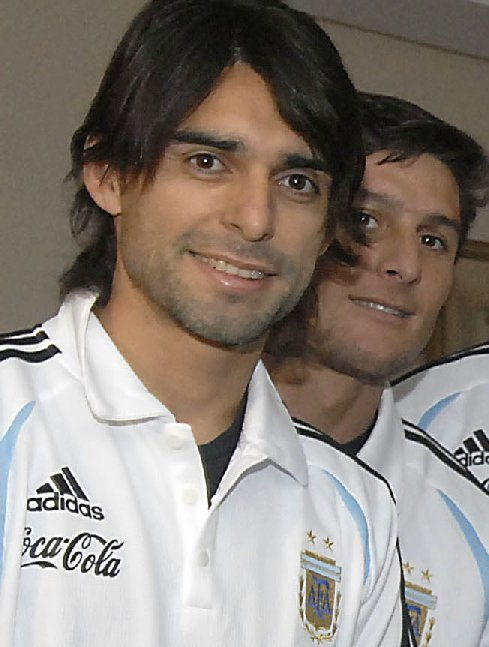
Ayala with Argentina in 2007

Ayala made his debut for Argentina on 16 November 1994 against Chile under coach Daniel Passarella.

Ayala played for Argentina U23 at the 1996 Summer Olympics, winning the silver medal. He played for Argentina in the 1998 FIFA World Cup and was a non-playing squad member in the 2002 competition due to a last-minute injury moments before their first match against Nigeria. He was selected as one of the three overage players then Argentina U23 won the gold medal at the 2004 Summer Olympics. Ayala played an integral part in the Argentine squad for the 2006 World Cup in Germany. He played brilliantly throughout the tournament and was picked as a member of the All Star Team. In the quarter-final against Germany, he scored a header that gave Argentina the 1–0 lead, although his side lost the penalty shootout after a 1–1 draw, with Ayala's spot kick being saved by Jens Lehmann.

On 30 May 2006, In a friendly match against Angola, Ayala earned his 100th cap for Argentina.

One of the best defenders in Argentina's history, on 7 February 2007 Ayala became the most capped player of the national team (most as captain), beating his friend Diego Simeone, in a friendly victory 1–0 against France played in the Stade de France in Paris.

On 5 June 2007, in a friendly against Algeria, Ayala captained Argentina for a record 58th international, having equalled Diego Maradona's mark of 57 in the 1–1 draw against Switzerland in Basel on 2 June.

On 17 July 2007, two days after playing in the 2007 Copa América final, which ended in a 3–0 defeat to Brazil, and during which he scored an own goal, Ayala announced his retirement from international football. Ayala stated, "it has nothing to do with what happened in the final of the Copa América." Javier Zanetti took over from him as captain.

== After retiring ==
=== Racing Club ===
On 30 December, Ayala retired from professional football. On 21 December 2011, Ayala was hired as a football coordinator at Racing Club. In September 2013, a new management arrived, and Ayala was released on 19 September 2013.

=== Valencia CF ===
In December 2013, Ayala was hired as a technical director / sport director for Valencia, where he was going to be the responsible for the whole South American area. The role also involved him scouting in that area to find young talents. He left the club in the middle of 2015.

=== Argentina ===
In January 2019, Ayala joined the technical staff of the Argentina national team as a field assistant of manager Lionel Scaloni.

=== 2026 FIFA World Cup incident ===
Following the 2026 World Cup final, Ayala approached Spain player, Dani Olmo, and made physical contact with him. FIFA announced an investigation into his conduct during the post-match incidents.

Ayala acknowledged pushing Olmo, saying: "We have to put an end to this matter and leave it at that. That is why I say I take responsibility, because it was just a push, no more. It was not a punch as they claim. It was just a push, no more, and the matter ended there." He described the incident as a "reaction to something he said," said that he would "apologize to him personally" and added that "This has happened thousands of times."

Olmo said Ayala was lying in justifying the punch as a reaction and that he did not need his apology.

On 29 July, FIFA opened proceedings, and on 21 August, the FIFA Disciplinary Committee found Ayala had breached article 14 paragraph 1(i) of the FIFA Disciplinary Code by committing one count of assault and imposed a three-match suspension and a fine of USD 30,000.

== Style of play ==
Regarded as an accomplished defender, Ayala was mainly known for his ability in the air and tackling. A complete defender, he was also noted for his speed, ability on the ball, and passing accuracy as a centre-back.

Ayala was an Argentine team official at the 2026 FIFA World Cup.

== Personal life ==
Ayala is married to Veronica, and has four children: Francisco, Sofía, Pilar and Martina.

== Career statistics ==
=== Club ===
Appearances and goals by club, season and competition
Club	Season	League			Cup		Continental		Other		Total	
Club	Season	Division	Apps	Goals	Apps	Goals	Apps	Goals	Apps	Goals	Apps	Goals
Ferro Carril Oeste	1991–92	Primera División	19	0	—		—		—		19	0
Ferro Carril Oeste	1992–93	Primera División	36	1	—		—		—		36	0
Ferro Carril Oeste	1993–94	Primera División	18	1	—		—		3 (Note: Appearances in the Copa Centenario de la AFA.)	0	21	1
Ferro Carril Oeste	Total		73	1	0	0	0	0	3	0	76	1
River Plate	1993–94	Primera División	16	0	—		—		—		16	0
River Plate	1994–95	Primera División	25	0	—		12	1	—		37	1
River Plate	Total		41	0	0	0	12	1	0	0	53	1
Napoli	1995–96	Serie A	29	0	1	0	—		—		30	1
Napoli	1996–97	Serie A	30	1	6	0	—		—		36	1
Napoli	1997–98	Serie A	28	0	2	0	—		—		30	0
Napoli	Total		87	1	9	0	0	0	0	0	96	1
Milan	1998–99	Serie A	11	0	2	0	—		—		13	0
Milan	1999–2000	Serie A	13	0	3	0	6	0	—		22	0
Milan	Total		24	0	5	0	6	0	0	0	35	0
Valencia	2000–01	La Liga	28	1	2	0	9	2	—		39	3
Valencia	2001–02	La Liga	29	2	1	0	7	0	—		37	2
Valencia	2002–03	La Liga	31	1	—		12	0	2 (Note: Appearances in the Supercopa de España.)	0	45	1
Valencia	2003–04	La Liga	30	1	5	0	10	0	—		45	1
Valencia	2004–05	La Liga	17	0	—		—		—		17	0
Valencia	2005–06	La Liga	23	2	—		6 (Note: Appearances in the Intertoto Cup.)	0	—		29	2
Valencia	2006–07	La Liga	29	2	4	0	8	1	—		41	3
Valencia	Total		187	9	14	0	52	3	2	0	253	12
Villarreal	2006–07	La Liga	0	0	0	0	–		–		0	
Zaragoza	2007–08	La Liga	33	1	4	0	2	0	—		39	1
Zaragoza	2008–09	Segunda División	28	3	—		—		—		28	3
Zaragoza	2009–10	La Liga	13	0	1	0	—		—		14	0
Zaragoza	Total		74	4	5	0	2	0	0	0	81	4
Racing	2009–10	Primera División	15	0	—		—		—		15	0
Career total			501	15	34	0	72	4	5	0	609	19

=== International ===
Appearances and goals by national team and year
National team	Year	Apps	Goals
Argentina	1994	3	0
Argentina	1995	14	0
Argentina	1996	6	0
Argentina	1997	7	0
Argentina	1998	13	1
Argentina	1999	12	1
Argentina	2000	11	1
Argentina	2001	8	0
Argentina	2002	1	0
Argentina	2003	6	0
Argentina	2004	10	1
Argentina	2005	8	2
Argentina	2006	7	1
Argentina	2007	9	0
Argentina	Total	115	7

Scores and results list Argentina's goal tally first, score column indicates score after each Ayala goal.

List of international goals scored by Roberto Ayala
No.	Date	Venue	Opponent	Score	Result	Competition
1	19 February 1998	Mendoza, Argentina	Romanian League		2–1	Unofficial Friendly
2	7 September 1999	Porto Alegre, Brazil	Brazil		2–4	Friendly
3	26 April 2000	Maracaibo, Venezuela	Venezuela	1–0	4–0	World Cup 2002 Qualifying
4	13 July 2004	Piura, Peru	Uruguay	3–2	4–2	2004 Copa América
5	12 November 2005	Geneva, Switzerland	England		2–3	Friendly
6	16 November 2005	Doha, Qatar	Qatar		3–0	Friendly
7	30 June 2006	Berlin, Germany	Germany	1–0	1–1 (2–4 PS)	2006 FIFA World Cup

== Honours ==
=== Player ===
River Plate

- Argentine Primera División: 1994 Apertura

Napoli

- Coppa Italia runner-up: 1996–97

Milan

- Serie A: 1998–99

Valencia

- La Liga: 2001–02, 2003–04
- UEFA Cup: 2003–04
- UEFA Super Cup: 2004
- UEFA Champions League runner-up: 2000–01
- UEFA Intertoto Cup runner-up: 2005

Argentina

- Olympic Gold Medal: 2004
- Olympic Silver Medal: 1996
- Pan American Games: 1995
- Copa América runner-up: 2004, 2007
- FIFA Confederations Cup runner-up: 1995

Individual

- South American Team of the Year: 1994
- UEFA Club Best Defender of the Year: 2000–01
- ESM Team of the Year: 2003–04
- Copa América Team of the Tournament: 2004
- FIFA World Cup All-Star Team: 2006
- IFFHS Argentina All Times Dream Team (Team B): 2021

=== Managerial ===
Argentina (as assistant manager)

- FIFA World Cup: 2022
- Copa América: 2021, 2024; third place: 2019
- CONMEBOL–UEFA Cup of Champions: 2022

== See also ==
- List of men's footballers with 100 or more international caps
