= ASD Albignasego Calcio =

Italian football club

- Full name: Associazione Sportiva Dilettantistica Albignasego Calcio
- Nickname: Tori (The Bulls)
- Founded: 1959; 67 years ago 2010 (refounded)
- Ground: Stadio Massimo Montagna
- Capacity: 3,000
- Manager: Cristiano Cecconello
- Coach: Antonio Paganin
- League: Eccellenza Veneto
- 2023–24: Eccellenza Veneto, Group A, 10th of 16
- Website: www.albignasegocalcio.it/societa/
Home colours	Away colours

Associazione Sportiva Dilettantistica Albignasego Calcio, commonly known as Albignasego and formerly Uniniversitaria Albignasego (pronounced [albiɲˈɲaːzeɡo]), is an Italian football club based in Albignasego, Veneto, who compete in Eccellenza, the fifth tier of the Italian football league system.

== History ==
Founded by a group of friends in 1959 under the name Albinasego Calcio, the club spent over 40 years competing in the lower tiers of Italian football before earning its first-ever promotion to Serie D in 2008.

The logo used for the rebirth of Albignasego and until 2013.

In 2010, it merged with San Paolo Calcio, forming a new club called Universitaria Albignasego. However, in 2013, the club returned to its original name.
