= Paolo Ziliani =

Italian footballer

Personal information
- Date of birth: 10 June 1971 (age 55)
- Place of birth: Romanshorn, Switzerland
- Height: 1.73 m (5 ft 8 in)
- Position: Defender

Senior career*
Years	Team	Apps	(Gls)
1989–1990	Brescia		
1990–1991	Carpi		
1991–1994	Brescia		
1992–1993	→ Napoli (loan)		
1994–1997	Cosenza		
1995–1996	→ Reggiana (loan)		
1997–1999	Reggina		
1999–2000	Treviso		
2000	Crotone		
2001–2002	Arezzo		
2003	Chieti		
2004	Cosenza		
2004	Chieti		
- * Club domestic league appearances and goals

Paolo Ziliani (born 10 June 1971) is a retired Italian football defender.
