= Carmelo Imbriani =

Italian footballer and coach (1976-2013)

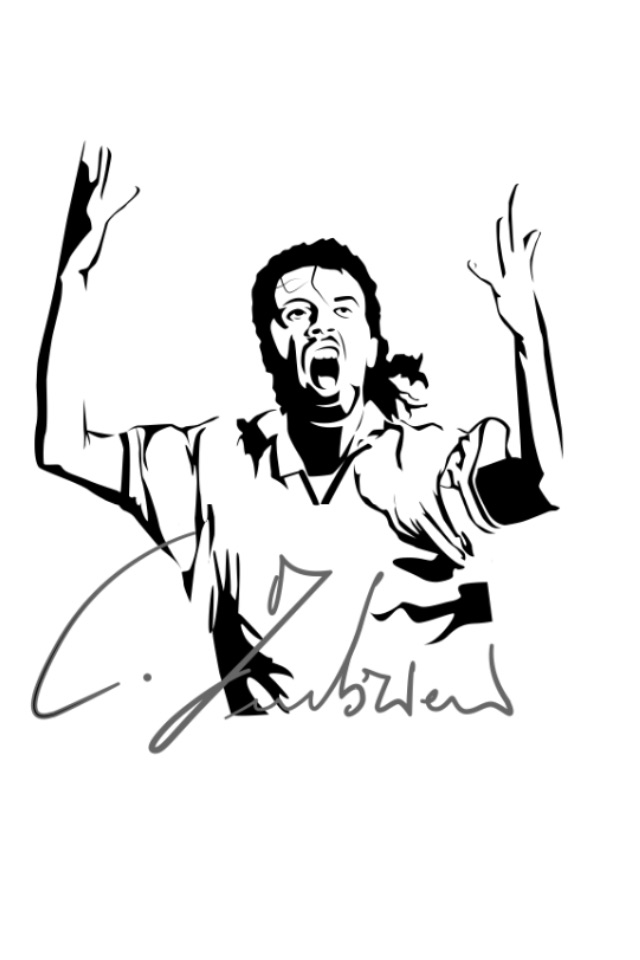
- An illustration of Imbrani

Personal information
- Full name: Carmelo Imbriani
- Date of birth: 10 February 1976
- Place of birth: Benevento, Italy
- Date of death: 15 February 2013 (aged 37)
- Place of death: Perugia, Italy
- Height: 1.78 m (5 ft 10 in)
- Position: Midfielder

Youth career
- 1991–1995: Napoli

Senior career*
Years	Team	Apps	(Gls)
1994–1999	Napoli	33	(3)
1996–1997	→ Pistoiese (loan)	24	(1)
1997–1998	→ Casarano (loan)	32	(2)
1999	Genoa	12	(0)
1999–2002	Cosenza	46	(2)
2002–2005	Benevento	43	(2)
2004	→ Foggia (loan)	12	(0)
2005–2006	Catanzaro	11	(0)
2006–2009	Benevento	91	(5)
Total		304	(15)

Managerial career
- 2009–2011: Benevento (Youth Team Coach)
- 2011–2012: Benevento
- * Club domestic league appearances and goals

Carmelo Imbriani (10 February 1976 – 15 February 2013) was an Italian footballer and former coach of Benevento in Lega Pro Prima Divisione.

== Biography ==
=== Playing career ===
==== Napoli and loans ====
Born in Benevento, Campania, 50 km northeast of Naples, Imbriani started his career at S.S.C. Napoli. He played his first Serie A match on 27 February 1994, substituted Renato Buso in the 79th minutes. The match Napoli lost to Cagliari 1–2. In 1995–96 season, he started to play regularly for Napoli, scored 2 goals in 25 league appearances.

He then spent 2 seasons loaned to Serie C1 sides Pistoiese and Casarano, before returned to Napoli in 1998, after Napoli relegated from Serie A in May. He played his last match for Napoli on 5 December 1998, along with Francesco Turrini replaced Massimiliano Esposito and Gennaro Scarlato in the 55th minutes, which also his first league match of the season. That match Napoli 0–0 draw with Torino. In January 1999, he left for another Serie B side Genoa.

==== Cosenza ====
In 1999–2000 season, he left for Serie B struggler Cosenza. He failed to play as a regular and only played 46 league matches in 3 seasons.

==== Benevento ====
In 2002–03 season Imbriani returned to hometown club Benevento and played 22 Serie C1 matches in the first season. He did not play any matches in 2003–04 season, and in January 2004 left for Foggia, also at Serie C1. In 2004–05 season, Imbriani returned to Benevento and made another 21 league appearances. In 2005, Benevento went bankrupt and a new team was re-founded in Serie C2, but Imbriani left for Serie B struggler Catanzaro on free transfer. But in January 2006, he returned to Benevento and played as a regular starter in the 2006-07 & 2007–08 season.

=== Coaching career ===
==== Benevento ====
In September 2009, he was appointed as the coach of Benevento's Allievi Regionali U16 Youth Team.

From 29 November 2011 to 15 October 2012 he was the coach of Benevento in Lega Pro Prima Divisione in place of the sacked Giovanni Simonelli.

== Illness and death ==
In August 2012, while still in charge of Benevento, Imbriani was discovered several lymphomas spread all over his body. Due to his condition, he was unable to fulfil his role in his final period at the club, and head coaching duties were effectively handled by his assistant Jorge Martínez, who resigned later in October; Imbriani successively tended his resignation immediately after Martínez left his role at the club.

Imbriani was hospitalized in Perugia due to his condition, receiving public solidarity from the whole Italian football world in his personal battle for life.

Imbriani died of leukemia in Perugia on 15 February 2013 at the age of 37.
