= Carlo Cornacchia =

Italian footballer (born 1965)

Personal information
- Date of birth: 4 May 1965 (age 61)
- Place of birth: Altamura, Italy
- Position: Defender

Youth career
- Torino

Senior career*
Years	Team	Apps	(Gls)
1985–1986	Puteolana	18	(2)
1986–1987	Prato	29	(1)
1987–1989	Reggiana	62	(4)
1989–1991	Cagliari	52	(6)
1991–1992	Atalanta	21	(3)
1992–1994	Napoli	3	(0)
1994–1996	Ancona	39	(1)
1996–1997	Rimini	7	(1)

Managerial career
- Colorado Rush (youth)
- 2017–2018: Nantes (technical coach)
- 2018–2019: Fulham (technical coach)
- 2019: Roma (technical coach)
- 2019–2021: Sampdoria (technical coach)
- 2021–2022: Watford (technical coach)
- 2022–2023: SPAL (assistant)
- * Club domestic league appearances and goals

Carlo Cornacchia (born 4 May 1965) is an Italian football manager.

== Career ==
=== Playing career ===
In 1985, Cornacchia signed for Italian third division side Puteolana, where he made 18 league appearances and scored 2 goals. In 1989, he signed for Cagliari in the Italian second division, helping them earn promotion to the Italian Serie A.

In 1991, Cornacchia signed for Italian Serie A club Atalanta. On 12 April 1992, he scored a 14-minute hat-trick during a 4-4 draw with Foggia, the fastest hat-trick in history for a defender. In 1994, he signed for Ancona in the Italian second division. In 1996, Cornacchia signed for Italian third division team Rimini.

=== Managerial career ===
He started his managerial career as youth manager of Colorado Rush in the American lower leagues. In 2017, Cornacchia was appointed technical coach of French Ligue 1 outfit Nantes. In 2018, he was appointed technical coach of Fulham in England.

In 2019, he was appointed technical coach of Italian side Roma. In 2021, Cornacchia was appointed technical coach of Watford in England.

In October 2022, he joined Serie B club SPAL to serve as Daniele De Rossi's assistant coach. He was relieved from his post, together with De Rossi and his entire staff, on 14 February 2023.
