= André Cruz =

Brazilian footballer (born 1968)

Personal information
- Full name: André Alves da Cruz
- Date of birth: 20 September 1968 (age 58)
- Place of birth: Piracicaba, Brazil
- Height: 1.82 m (6 ft 0 in)
- Position: Defender

Senior career*
Years	Team	Apps	(Gls)
1986–1989	Ponte Preta	14	(0)
1989–1990	Flamengo	26	(5)
1990–1994	Standard Liège	107	(18)
1994–1997	Napoli	83	(13)
1997–1999	AC Milan	13	(1)
1999	Standard Liège	10	(1)
1999	Torino	13	(1)
1999–2002	Sporting CP	78	(9)
2002–2003	Goiás	16	(1)
2003–2004	Internacional	10	(1)
2004	Goiás	2	(0)
Total		372	(50)

International career
1985	Brazil U17	6	(1)
1987	Brazil U20	4	(2)
1988–1998	Brazil	31	(1)
Medal record
Men's football
Representing Brazil
Olympic Games
Silver medal – second place	1988 Seoul	Team competition
Pan American Games
Gold medal – first place	1987 Indianapolis	Team competition
- * Club domestic league appearances and goals

André Alves da Cruz (born 20 September 1968) is a Brazilian former professional footballer who played as a central defender. He played for several clubs in Brazil and Europe, and also represented the Brazil national team, taking part in the 1989 and 1995 Copa América tournaments, and the 1998 FIFA World Cup, as well as the 1987 Pan American Games and the 1988 Summer Olympics.

== Club career ==
Cruz began his playing career with Brazilian clubs Ponte Preta and Flamengo, before moving to play football in Europe. He initially joined Belgian club Standard Liège, but later also played in Italy, where he represented Napoli, AC Milan, and Torino. He subsequently joined Portuguese side Sporting CP, before moving back to Brazil, where he played with Goiás and Internacional before ending his career.

== International career ==
André Cruz made 47 appearances (12 in non-official matches) with the Brazil national team between 1988 and 1998. With the Brazil under-20 side, he won a gold medal at the 1987 Pan American Games in Indianapolis, and a silver medal at the 1988 Summer Olympics in Seoul; he was a member of the Brazil senior team that won the 1989 Copa América the following year. He was included in the Brazilian team that won the 1995 Umbro Cup and which finished runners-up in the 1995 Copa América; he was later also a member of the Brazilian squad that finished runners-up in the 1998 FIFA World Cup.

== Honours ==
Flamengo

- Copa do Brasil: 1990

Internacional

- Campeonato Gaúcho: 2003

Standard Liège

- Belgian Cup: 1992–93

AC Milan

- Serie A: 1998–99

Sporting

- SuperLiga: 1999–2000, 2001–02
- Supertaça Cândido de Oliveira: 2000
- Taça de Portugal: 2001–02

Brazil

- Pan American Games Gold Medal: 1987
- Summer Olympic Silver Medal: 1988
- Copa América: 1989; runner-up 1995
- Umbro Cup: 1995
- FIFA World Cup runner-up: 1998

Individual

- DH The Best Standard Liège Team Ever: 2020
