= Alessandro Sbrizzo =

Italian footballer (born 1975)

Personal information
- Date of birth: 11 April 1975 (age 51)
- Place of birth: Naples, Italy
- Position: Defender

Senior career*
Years	Team	Apps	(Gls)
1999–2000	Napoli	13	(0)
1996–1997	→ Reggina (loan)	15	(0)
1997–1998	→ Padova (loan)	1	(0)
2000–2001	Savoia	7	(0)
2001–2005	Delfino Pescara	91	(6)
- * Club domestic league appearances and goals

Alessandro Sbrizzo (born 11 April 1975) is an Italian retired footballer.

== Career ==
After not getting paid by U.S. Savoia 1908, receiving offers from Serie C clubs with unsatisfactory financial conditions, and being disillusioned with the controversies and violence surrounding football, Sbrizzo retired aged 30. In addition, his career was hampered by injuries and he desired to become a coach.

While vacationing as a player, Sbrizzo travelled to the United States and decided to buy a house there. Eventually, he became a coach at the A.C. Milan academy in Miami before returning to Italy.
