= Angelo Pagotto =

Italian footballer (born 1973)

Personal information
- Date of birth: 21 November 1973 (age 52)
- Place of birth: Verbania, Piedmont, Italy
- Height: 6 ft 0 in (1.83 m)
- Position: Goalkeeper

Team information
- Current team: Avellino (goalkeeping coach)

Youth career
- 1992–1994: Napoli

Senior career*
Years	Team	Apps	(Gls)
1994–1995	Pistoiese	34	(0)
1995–1996	Sampdoria	24	(0)
1996–1997	Milan	8	(0)
1997–1998	Perugia	30	(0)
1998	Empoli	4	(0)
1998	Reggiana	12	(0)
1998–2000	Perugia	8	(0)
2001–2003	Triestina	52	(0)
2003–2005	Arezzo	82	(0)
2005–2006	Torino	0	(0)
2006–2007	Grosseto	8	(0)
2007	→ Crotone (loan)	5	(0)
Total		267	(0)

International career
1991–1992	Italy U18	3	(0)
1994–1996	Italy U21	10	(0)
Medal record
Men's football
Representing Italy
UEFA European Under-21 Championship
Winner	1994 France
Winner	1996 Spain
- * Club domestic league appearances and goals

Angelo Pagotto (born 21 November 1973) is an Italian former footballer who played as a goalkeeper.

== Career ==
=== Club ===
He reached the peak of his career in the 1996–97 season when he joined Serie A team A.C. Milan after spells with Sampdoria and Pistoiese. Giorgio Morini originally planned to use Pagotto as his first choice goalkeeper, but by the end of the season he was only second-choice behind Sebastiano Rossi. He spent just one season at Milan, making eight league appearances in the process, before moving on to fellow Serie A side Perugia.

Following a short stay at the Stadio Renato Curi, Pagotto had spells at Empoli and Reggiana in Serie B before returning to Perugia for another season. After his second run at the Umbrian outfit, he dropped down two divisions to play for the Serie C1/A side Triestina and was instrumental in their successful 2001–02 season that saw them finish runners-up and earn promotion to the Serie B.

He spent another season at Triestina, helping them finish 5th in their first season in Serie B since the 1990–91 season before dropping back down a division with Arezzo. Arezzo conceded just 27 times in 34 games in the 2003–04 season (with Pagotto playing on 30 occasions in the league) as they marched to the title, something Pagotto just missed out on two seasons earlier with Triestina. He remained their first choice goalkeeper in Serie B as Amaranto survived relegation.

Since leaving the Stadio Città di Arezzo in 2005, Pagotto has had spells with Torino and Grosseto, before ending his career at Crotone.

=== International ===
Pagotto was the first-choice goalkeeper for the Italy national U21 side between 1994 and 1996. He is a two-time winner of the UEFA European Under-21 Championship, both times under the guidance of then manager Cesare Maldini. He notched a total of ten caps for the Azzurrini. However, he was never capped with the Italy national team.

He was also part of the squad that competed at the 1996 Atlanta Olympics alongside Gianluigi Buffon, Fabio Cannavaro, Alessandro Nesta, Gianluca Pagliuca and Christian Panucci.

== Drug scandal ==
On 28 April 2007, just before a game in the Serie B between Pagotto's Crotone and Spezia, Pagotto tested positive for cocaine. He pleaded guilty at a hearing on 30 July and was banned from professional football for life. He appealed and, on 14 September, his sentence was reduced to eight years. The ban expired in 2015, when he was 41.

== Coaching career ==
In March 2019, Pagotto officially made his football comeback, accepting to join Lucchese as a goalkeeping coach. Later in 2019 he left Lucchese to sign for Avellino as a goalkeeping coach.
