= Ciro Caruso =

Italian footballer

Personal information
- Date of birth: 14 August 1973 (age 53)
- Place of birth: Naples, Italy
- Height: 1.83 m (6 ft 0 in)
- Position: Defender

Youth career
- 1990–1993: Napoli

Senior career*
Years	Team	Apps	(Gls)
1993–1996	Napoli	1	(0)
1994–1995	→ Ischia (loan)	14	(0)
1996–1997	Carpi	14	(3)
1997–1998	Reggiana	21	(1)
1998–2000	Pescara	8	(0)
2000–2002	Napoli	13	(0)
2001	→ Benevento (loan)	8	(2)
2002–2003	Carrarese	22	(0)
2003	Palmese	1	(0)
2004	Siracusa	16	(1)
2004–2005	Internapoli		
Total		118	(7)
- * Club domestic league appearances and goals

Ciro Caruso (born 14 August 1973), is an Italian former professional footballer who played as a defender.

== Career ==
Born in Naples, Caruso began his career and had the greatest number of seasons playing for SSC Napoli. He also had notable spells in Reggiana, Pescara and Carrarese.

== Post career ==
After retiring as a player, Caruso became a FIFA agent.
