= Raffaele Di Fusco =

Italian footballer and coach

Raffaele DiFusco
Personal information
- Date of birth: 6 October 1961 (age 65)
- Place of birth: Riardo, Italy
- Height: 1.80 m (5 ft 11 in)
- Position: Goalkeeper

Team information
- Current team: Aurora Pro Patria 1919 (Goalkeeper coach)

Senior career*
Years	Team	Apps	(Gls)
1980–1983	Vicenza	26	(0)
1983–1990	Napoli	17	(0)
1985–1986	→ Catanzaro (loan)	26	(0)
1991–1993	Torino	3	(0)
1993–1998	Napoli	17	(0)
Total		89	(0)

Managerial career
- 1998–2000: Napoli (youth)
- 2000–2001: Napoli (GK coach)
- 2001–2002: Viribus Unitis
- 2002–2003: Cavese
- 2004–2005: Siena (GK coach)
- 2006–2007: Messina (GK coach)
- 2008–: Aurora Pro Patria 1919 (GK coach)
- * Club domestic league appearances and goals

Raffaele Di Fusco (born 6 October 1961 in Riardo) is an Italian former professional football coach and a former player who played as a goalkeeper. In 2008 he became goalkeeping coach with Aurora Pro Patria 1919.

== Honours ==
Napoli

- Serie A: 1986–87, 1989–90.
- Coppa Italia: 1986–87.
- UEFA Cup: 1988–89.

Torino

- Coppa Italia: 1992–93.
