= Roberto Bordin =

Italian footballer and manager

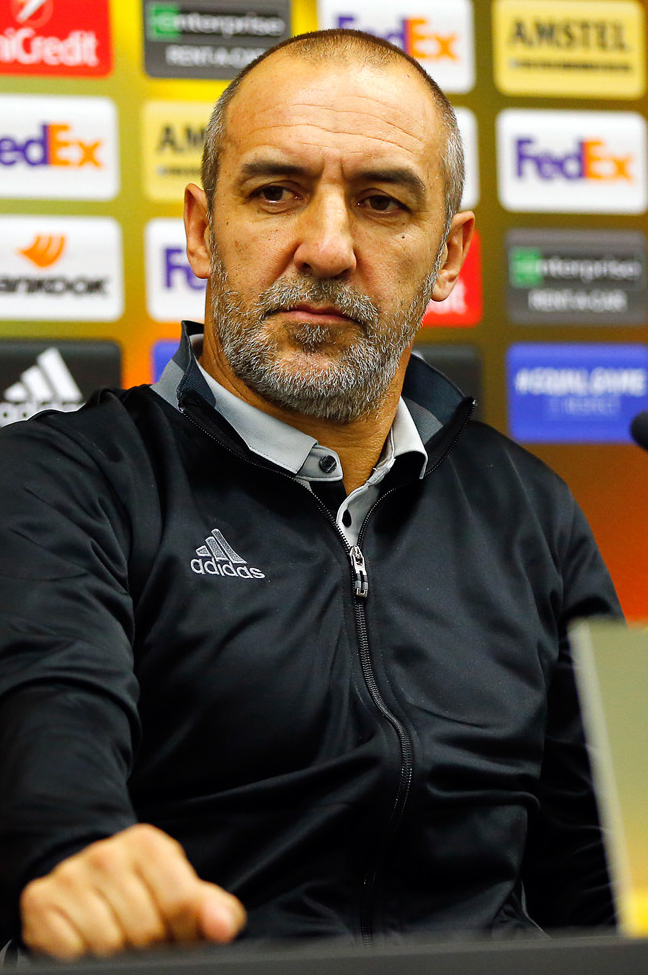
- Bordin in 2017

Personal information
- Date of birth: 10 January 1965 (age 61)
- Place of birth: Zawiya, Libya
- Height: 1.72 m (5 ft 8 in)
- Position: Midfielder

Youth career
- Sanremese

Senior career*
| Years | Team | Apps | (Gls) |
| 1982–1984 | Sanremese | 42 | (3) |
| 1984–1985 | Taranto | 33 | (1) |
| 1985–1986 | Parma | 29 | (1) |
| 1986–1989 | Cesena | 91 | (9) |
| 1989–1993 | Atalanta | 122 | (5) |
| 1993–1997 | Napoli | 108 | (0) |
| 1997–1998 | Piacenza | 21 | (0) |
| 1998–1999 | Triestina | 32 | (1) |
| 1999–2002 | Spezia | 94 | (9) |
| 2002–2003 | Vicenza | 31 | (0) |
| 2003–2005 | Spezia | 63 | (5) |
| Total | | 666 | (34) |

Managerial career
- 2016: Triestina
- 2016–2018: Sheriff Tiraspol
- 2018–2020: Neftçi Baku
- 2021: Moldova
- 2023: Sheriff Tiraspol
- 2024: Triestina
- 2024: Elbasani
- 2025: Caldiero Terme
- 2025: Tirana
- * Club domestic league appearances and goals

Roberto Bordin (born 10 January 1965) is a retired Italian footballer, who played as a midfielder.

== Career ==
On 8 June 2018, Bordin was announced as Neftchi Baku's new manager on a two-year contract. On 18 January 2020, the club announced the end of the contract.

On 12 February 2021, he was announced as the new manager of the Moldova national football team. He oversaw Moldova during 2022 World Cup qualification, in which Moldova suffered its worst defeat ever, a 0-8 loss to Denmark. Bordin left the position after his contract expired on 30 November 2021.

On 9 January 2023, Sheriff Tiraspol announced the return of Bordin. Following Sheriff's 6-0 defeat to Slavia Prague in the UEFA Europa League, Bordin was fired as the club's head coach.

On 5 February 2024, Bordin returned to work at Triestina, agreeing to guide the Serie C club until 30 June 2024 with an automatic extension in case of promotion to Serie B. After a lacklustre end of season, Triestina announced they would not extend Bordin's short-term contract with the club.

On 11 July 2024, Bordin signed with AF Elbasani in his first experience in Albanian football.

On 20 January 2025, Bordin returned to manage in Italy as the new head coach of Serie C relegation battlers Caldiero Terme. His stint at Caldiero lasted only one month, as he was dismissed on 20 February 2025.

== Managerial statistics ==
As of 5 October 2023

Managerial record by team and tenure
| Team | From | To | Record | | | | |
| Team | From | To | P | W | D | L | Win % |
|---|---|---|---|---|---|---|---|
| Triestina | 8 March 2016 | 30 June 2016 | 8 | 1 | 5 | 2 | 12.5 |
| Sheriff Tiraspol | 5 October 2016 | 24 April 2018 | 62 | 40 | 14 | 8 | 64.5 |
| Neftçi | 8 June 2018 | 18 January 2020 | 54 | 30 | 13 | 11 | 55.6 |
| Moldova | 12 February 2021 | 30 November 2021 | 12 | 1 | 1 | 10 | 8.3 |
| Sheriff Tiraspol | 9 January 2023 | 6 October 2023 | 36 | 22 | 6 | 8 | 61.1 |
| Triestina | 5 February 2024 | 30 June 2024 | 17 | 5 | 5 | 7 | 29.4 |
| Elbasani | 9 July 2024 | 5 December 2024 | 18 | 6 | 9 | 3 | 33.3 |
| Total | | | 207 | 105 | 53 | 49 | 50.7 |

=== Manager ===
Sheriff Tiraspol

- Moldovan National Division (3): 2016–17, 2017, 2022–23
- Moldovan Cup (2): 2016-17, 2022-23
- Moldovan Super Cup (1) : 2017

=== Individual ===
==== Manager ====
- Divizia Națională Coach of the year: 2017
