= Gaetano De Rosa =

Italian retired football defender

Personal information
- Full name: Gaetano De Rosa
- Date of birth: 10 May 1973 (age 53)
- Place of birth: Düsseldorf, West Germany
- Position: Defender

Youth career
- 1991–1993: Napoli

Senior career*
Years	Team	Apps	(Gls)
1992–1995	Napoli	3	(0)
1993–1994	→ Palermo (loan)	28	(2)
1995	Pistoiese	1	(0)
1995–1997	Savoia	53	(1)
1997–2004	Bari	212	(12)
2004–2006	Reggina	67	(6)
2006–2008	Genoa	50	(8)
- * Club domestic league appearances and goals

Gaetano De Rosa (born 10 May 1973 in Düsseldorf, West Germany) is an Italian retired football defender.

== History ==
Although born in Germany, De Rosa is entirely of Italian background with family from the Alps and Naples. Indeed, it was with the local side Napoli that he first broke through into the youth side, before making it professionally with the club in the early 1990s. He is best known for his long-standing period with Bari in the Serie A, where he established himself as a mainstay for the galletti. In 2004, he left Bari to join Reggina, where he spent a total of two seasons. In 2006, he signed for Serie B's Genoa, helping his side to win promotion to the top flight. After spending another season with Genoa, he was released in July 2008, and confirmed his retirement from active football later on September.
