= Massimo Agostini =

Italian footballer (born 1964)

Personal information
- Date of birth: 20 January 1964 (age 62)
- Place of birth: Rimini, Italy
- Position: Striker

Senior career*
Years	Team	Apps	(Gls)
1982–1986	Cesena	78	(19)
1986–1988	A.S. Roma	40	(6)
1988–1990	Cesena	59	(22)
1990–1991	A.C. Milan	12	(2)
1991–1992	Parma	30	(4)
1992–1994	Ancona	67	(30)
1994–1996	Napoli	62	(13)
1996–1999	Cesena	78	(26)
1999	Ravenna	10	(0)
1999–2000	Spezia	31	(4)
2001–2002	Tivoli	8	(2)
2002–2003	Forlì	22	(3)
2003–2004	Cesenatico		
2005–2008	Murata		
Total		497	(131)

Managerial career
- 2004–2007: Italy (Beach soccer)
- 2008–2010: Murata
- 2009–2010: San Marino U-21
- 2010–2011: Cesena (Primavera)
- 2012–2013: Riviera di Romagna
- 2017: Italy (Beach soccer)
- * Club domestic league appearances and goals

Massimo Agostini (born 20 January 1964) is an Italian football manager and former player.

== Playing career ==
Agostini was born in Rimini. A striker, he started his professional playing career with Cesena in 1982. In 1986, he signed for A.S. Roma, scoring a total of six goals in forty appearances throughout two seasons. He then returned to Cesena before joining A.C. Milan in 1990, where he was rarely featured in the starting lineup and played only 12 matches, scoring two goals, as Milan won the European Super Cup and the Intercontinental Cup in 1990. He then played for Parma, Ancona (two seasons, the first in Serie A and the second in Serie B). With Parma, he won the 1991–92 Coppa Italia, and with Ancona, he was the top scorer during the 1993–94 Serie B, scoring 18 goals. He then moved to Napoli for two seasons, scoring 13 goals, before returning to Cesena in 1996. In 1999, he finally left Cesena, joining Ravenna, and spent successive seasons with minor league teams such as Spezia, Tivoli, Forlì and Cesenatico.

In 2005, at the age of 42, he accepted a move to Sammarinese Football Championship team Murata, winning two consecutive Sanmarinese titles and being part of the squad that featured in the first qualifying round of the 2007–08 UEFA Champions League.

In addition to his role with Murata, Agostini also played beach soccer, being part of the Italian national team, and serving also as their head coach from October 2004 to May 2007.

== Coaching career ==
In November 2007 Agostini was promoted to player-coach of Murata, replacing Gianluigi Pasquali and leading his club to a double in his first season as manager, winning both the national championship title and domestic cup of San Marino.

In February 2009 Agostini was named new head coach of the San Marino U-21 national team, whilst continuing his duties as head coach of Murata.

== Honours ==
A.C. Milan

- European Super Cup: 1990
- Intercontinental Cup: 1990

Parma

- Coppa Italia: 1991–92

Murata

- Campionato Sammarinese di Calcio: 2005–06, 2006–07
- Coppa Titano: 2006–07
- Trofeo Federale: 2006

Individual

- Serie B top scorer: 1993–94
