= Massimo Tarantino =

Italian footballer (born 1971)

Personal information
- Date of birth: 20 May 1971 (age 55)
- Place of birth: Palermo, Italy
- Height: 1.82 m (5 ft 11 1/2 in)
- Position: Defender

Senior career*
Years	Team	Apps	(Gls)
1986–1989	Catania	33	(1)
1989–1996	Napoli	100	(0)
1989–1990	→ Monza (loan)	12	(0)
1990–1991	→ Barletta (loan)	34	(0)
1996–1997	Inter Milan	0	(0)
1997–2002	Bologna	89	(0)
2002–2004	Como	34	(2)
2004–2005	Triestina	24	(0)
2005–2006	Pavia	17	(0)
- * Club domestic league appearances and goals

Massimo Tarantino (born 20 May 1971 in Palermo) is a retired Italian professional football player and the current youth academy director of Inter Milan.

== Coaching and management ==
Tarantino passed the sporting director exam in 2007 and then joined A.C. Pavia 1911 S.S.D. On 27 May 2010, he became the head of the Bologna F.C. 1909 youth department. From July 2013 to September 2019, he was part of the youth staff at A.S. Roma alongside Bruno Conti. In August 2021, he joined S.P.A.L. as technical director.

== 2022 supermarket stabbing ==
In October 2022, Tarantino made international news after being named as one of two people who immobilised a man who had stabbed six people, including fellow footballer Pablo Marí, in a Milan supermarket, killing one person. Tarantino and one other person disarmed and held the attacker until police arrived.

== Honours ==
Napoli

- Serie A champion: 1989–90 (loaned out after playing 1 league game)

Bologna

- UEFA Intertoto Cup winner: 1998
