= Renato Buso =

Italian footballer and coach

Personal information
- Date of birth: 19 December 1969 (age 56)
- Place of birth: Treviso, Italy
- Height: 1.82 m (6 ft 0 in)
- Position: Midfielder

Senior career*
Years	Team	Apps	(Gls)
1984–1985	Montebelluna	0	(0)
1985–1989	Juventus	55	(10)
1989–1991	Fiorentina	49	(9)
1991–1993	Sampdoria	34	(4)
1993–1996	Napoli	95	(11)
1996–1997	Lazio	16	(1)
1997–2000	Piacenza	61	(4)
2000–2001	Cagliari	32	(4)
2001–2003	Spezia	39	(1)
Total		381	(44)

Managerial career
- 2004–2005: Spezia (asst)
- 2006–2007: Sarzanese
- 2007–2008: Spezia (youth)
- 2008–2011: Fiorentina (youth)
- 2011–2013: Gavorrano
- 2013–2014: Chievo (asst)
- 2018–2019: Sangiovannese
- * Club domestic league appearances and goals

Renato Buso (born 19 December 1969) is an Italian professional football coach and a former player who was deployed as a forward or as a midfielder.

== Club career ==
Born in Treviso, Buso initially began his career playing as a striker or as a centre-forward with Juventus in Serie A in 1985, at the age of 16, immediately winning the 1985–86 Serie A title and the 1985 Intercontinental Cup, although he was mainly a reserve player at the club, behind forwards Aldo Serena, Ian Rush, and Alessandro Altobelli. He later moved to Fiorentina in 1989, where he was deployed alongside Roberto Baggio and Oscar Dertycia as a winger, or as a supporting striker. During his time at the club, he played and scored in the 1990 UEFA Cup Final against his former team, although Fiorentina would lose the tournament. He subsequently moved to Sampdoria in 1991, where he won the 1991 Supercoppa Italiana. He began to be deployed as a midfielder as his career progressed, and he later also played for Napoli (1993–1996), Lazio (1996–97), Piacenza (1997–2000), Cagliari (2000–01), ending his career with La Spezia in Serie C1 (2001–04).

== International career ==
Buso also represented Italy at youth level at the 1992 Summer Olympics, and at the 1992 UEFA European Under-21 Championship under Cesare Maldini, where he helped Italy to win the tournament, finishing as the top goalscorer, with 3 goals over the semi-final against Denmark, and the final against Sweden. In total, he made 5 appearances for Italy's Olympic Squad, and 25 appearances for the Under-21 side, scoring 9 goals.

== Coaching career ==
On 17 November 2011, he became the new coach of Gavorrano in place of the sacked Guido Pagliuca. He was dismissed in April 2013, with Gavorrano in deep relegation zone under risk of leaving professional football, and replaced by Corrado Orrico.

== Honours ==
Juventus

- Serie A: 1985–86

Sampdoria

- Supercoppa Italiana: 1991

Italy U21

- UEFA European Under-21 Football Championship: 1992

Individual

- UEFA European Under-21 Football Championship top scorer: 1992
- UEFA European Under-21 Football Championship Golden Player: 1992
