= Roberto Policano =

Italian footballer

Personal information
- Full name: Roberto Policano
- Date of birth: 19 February 1964 (age 62)
- Place of birth: Rome, Italy
- Height: 1.84 m (6 ft 0 in)
- Positions: Midfielder; defender

Senior career*
Years	Team	Apps	(Gls)
1981–1983	Latina	47	(6)
1983–1987	Genoa	118	(9)
1987–1989	Roma	35	(5)
1989–1992	Torino	80	(18)
1992–1997	Napoli	92	(12)
1997	Casarano	4	(0)
1998	Terracina		
1998–1999	Latina		
1999	Sliema Wanderers	0	(0)
1999–2000	Baracca Lugo		
- * Club domestic league appearances and goals

Roberto Policano (born 19 February 1964 in Rome) is an Italian former professional footballer who played as a midfielder or as a defender for several Italian clubs.

== Honours ==
=== Club ===
Torino

- Serie B (1): 1989–90
- Mitropa Cup (1): 1991

=== Individual ===
- Torino FC Hall of Fame: 2019
