= Luca Altomare =

Italian footballer and coach

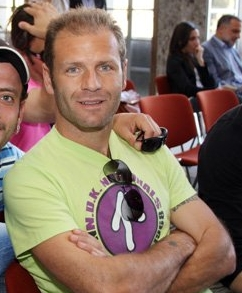

Personal information
- Date of birth: 14 January 1972 (age 54)
- Place of birth: Cosenza, Italy
- Height: 1.78 m (5 ft 10 in)
- Position: Midfielder

Youth career
- –1989: Cosenza

Senior career*
Years	Team	Apps	(Gls)
1989–1991	Napoli	14	(0)
1991–1992	Reggiana	10	(0)
1992–1994	Napoli	18	(1)
1994	Lucchese	17	(2)
1994–1999	Napoli	77	(3)
1999–2002	Cosenza	75	(0)
2002–2003	SPAL	26	(0)
2003–2004	Cosenza	17	(0)
2004–2005	Vigor Lamezia	27	(0)
2005–2007	Rende	25	(0)
2007–2008	Fortitudo Cosenza	16	(0)
Total		322	(6)

International career
1992–1993	Italy U21	4	(0)

Managerial career
- 2009–2011: Cosenza (assistant)
- 2011–2012: Cosenza (youth)
- 2012–2013: Ternana (assistant)
- 2014–2015: Comprensorio Montalto
- 2016: Avellino (assistant)
- * Club domestic league appearances and goals

Luca Altomare (born 14 January 1972) is an Italian football coach and retired midfielder.

== Career ==
While playing for Napoli, Altomare was given the number 10 jersey and the captain's armband for a friendly against Internazionale.

Despite getting called up to the Italy squad for the 1996 UEFA European Under-21 Championship, Altomare decided not to go because he was getting married.
