= 1994 Coppa Italia final =

46th Coppa Italia final
- Event: 1993–94 Coppa Italia
Ancona	Sampdoria
1	6

First leg
Ancona	Sampdoria
0	0
- Date: 6 April 1994
- Venue: Stadio del Conero, Ancona
- Referee: Alfredo Trentalange
- Attendance: 16,871

Second leg
Sampdoria	Ancona
6	1
- Date: 20 April 1994
- Venue: Stadio Luigi Ferraris, Genoa
- Referee: Luciano Luci
- Attendance: 39,000

The 1994 Coppa Italia final decided the winner of the 1993–94 Coppa Italia. It was held on 6 and 20 April 1994 between Sampdoria and Ancona.

Sampdoria won 6–1 on aggregate.

== First leg ==
6 April 1994
21:00

Ancona	0–0	Sampdoria

Stadio del Conero, Ancona
Attendance: 16,871
Referee: Alfredo Trentalange

Ancona	Sampdoria

GK	1	(Italy) Andrea Armellini
RB	2	(Italy) Sean Sogliano (c)	(yellow card) 23'
CB	5	(Italy) Salvatore Mazzarano
CB	6	(Czech Republic) Miloš Glonek
LB	3	(Italy) Felice Centofanti	(yellow card) 60'
MF	7	(Italy) Fabio Lupo
MF	4	(Italy) Marco Pecoraro Scanio
MF	8	(Italy) Andrea Bruniera		(substituted off) 49'
MF	9	(Italy) Gianluca De Angelis
CF	10	(Italy) Massimo Agostini
CF	11	(Italy) Sebastiano Vecchiola
Substitutes:
FW		(Italy) Nicola Caccia		(substituted in) 49'
Manager:
(Italy) Vincenzo Guerini

GK	1	(Italy) Gianluca Pagliuca
RB	2	(Italy) Giovanni Dall'Igna	(yellow card) 67'
CB	5	(Italy) Pietro Vierchowod
CB	6	(Italy) Stefano Sacchetti	(yellow card) 21'
LB	3	(Italy) Michele Serena
RM	7	(Italy) Attilio Lombardo
CM	9	(England) David Platt
CM	11	(Italy) Alberico Evani
LM	8	(Federal Republic of Yugoslavia) Vladimir Jugović		(substituted off) 70'
CF	4	(Netherlands) Ruud Gullit
CF	10	(Italy) Roberto Mancini (c)
Substitutes:
MF		(Italy) Giovanni Invernizzi		(substituted in) 70'
Manager:
(Sweden) Sven-Göran Eriksson

== Second leg ==
20 April 1994
21:00

Sampdoria	6–1	Ancona
Vecchiola 50' (o.g.); Lombardo 50' 75'; Vierchowod 65'; Bertarelli 80' (pen.); Evani 85' (pen.)		Lupo 72'

Stadio Luigi Ferraris, Genoa
Attendance: 39,000
Referee: Luciano Luci

Sampdoria	Ancona

GK	1	(Italy) Gianluca Pagliuca
RB	2	(Italy) Giovanni Invernizzi
CB	5	(Italy) Pietro Vierchowod (c)
CB	6	(Italy) Stefano Sacchetti	(substituted off) 87'
LB	3	(Italy) Michele Serena
RM	7	(Italy) Attilio Lombardo
CM	9	(England) David Platt
CM	11	(Italy) Alberico Evani
LM	8	(Federal Republic of Yugoslavia) Vladimir Jugović
CF	4	(Netherlands) Ruud Gullit
CF	10	(Italy) Mauro Bertarelli	(substituted off) 87'
Substitutes:
MF		(Italy) Fausto Salsano	(substituted in) 87'
DF		(Italy) Moreno Mannini	(substituted in) 87'
Manager:
(Sweden) Sven-Göran Eriksson

GK	1	(Italy) Alessandro Nista
RB	2	(Italy) Stefano Fontana	(yellow card) 36'
CB	5	(Italy) Salvatore Mazzarano
CB	6	(Czech Republic) Miloš Glonek
LB	3	(Italy) Sean Sogliano	(c) (yellow card) 67'
RM	7	(Italy) Fabio Lupo
CM	4	(Italy) Marco Pecoraro Scanio
CM	8	(Italy) Massimo Gadda		(substituted off) 59'
LM	10	(Italy) Gianluca De Angelis	(yellow card) 67'	(substituted off) 68'
CF	9	(Italy) Massimo Agostini
CF	11	(Italy) Sebastiano Vecchiola
Substitutes:
FW		(Italy) Nicola Caccia		(substituted in) 59'
DF		(Italy) Andrea Bruniera		(substituted in) 68'
Manager:
(Italy) Vincenzo Guerini

== See also ==
- 1993–94 UC Sampdoria season
