= 1994–95 Anglo-Italian Cup =

Coppa Anglo-Italiana 1994–95

Tournament details
- Host country: England; Italy
- Dates: 24 August 1994–19 March 1995
- Teams: 16

Final positions
- Champions: Notts County (1st title)
- Runners-up: Ascoli

Tournament statistics
- Matches played: 37
- Goals scored: 98 (2.65 per match)
- Top scorers: (Italy) Nicola Caccia; (5 goals)

The 1994–95 Anglo-Italian Cup (Italian: Coppa Anglo-Italiana 1994–95) was the third staging of the 1992–96 iteration of the Anglo-Italian Cup, an association football competition contested by teams from the Football League First Division and Serie B, then respectively the second tiers of the English football league system and the Italian football league system. Sixteen teams participated, with eight entering from each league.

Clubs were invited to compete based on their final league position in the previous season, though not all of the eligible English clubs entered. The tournament began with an international stage which saw teams playing matches against those from the opposite league. Two teams from each country then advanced to the semi-finals, which were one all-English and one all-Italian tie, ensuring a final between an English team and an Italian team at Wembley Stadium. Ascoli and Notts County reached the final, respectively beating Ancona and Stoke City in the semi-finals, and Notts County won the tournament by winning the final 2–1. Nicola Caccia of Ancona was the competition's top scorer with five goals.

This was the only staging of the tournament in the 1990s to be won by an English side. The competition was criticised by some as a low-interest distraction, and several contentious incidents contributed to its reputation for violence, notably a match between Sheffield United and Udinese which saw a 15-man brawl and the dismissal of four players. Despite its reputation, the tournament proved a season highlight for the finalists, both of whom experienced otherwise poor campaigns culminating in relegation to their respective third tiers.

== Participants and format ==
The Anglo-Italian Cup had been staged intermittently since 1970, and was revived in 1992, in England serving as a replacement for the Full Members' Cup. This iteration of the tournament was contested by teams from the Football League First Division, then the second tier of the English football league system, and Serie B, the second tier of the Italian football league system. In earlier seasons, First Division clubs had participated in a qualifying stage to determine which teams played in the international stage, but this was dispensed with in the 1994–95 season, and invitations instead given to the three teams relegated from the previous season's Premier League and the five highest-placed non-promoted teams from the previous season's First Division. Serie B clubs were selected on a similar basis. Of the eligible English clubs, Millwall and Oldham Athletic declined their invitations, with Middlesbrough and Stoke City taking their places. The participating clubs and their 1993–94 league positions were as follows:

English teams

- Derby County, 6th in the First Division
- Middlesbrough, 9th in the First Division
- Notts County, 7th in the First Division
- Sheffield United, 20th in the Premier League
- Stoke City, 10th in the First Division
- Swindon Town, 22nd in the Premier League
- Tranmere Rovers, 5th in the First Division
- Wolverhampton Wanderers, 8th in the First Division

Italian teams

- Ancona, 8th in Serie B
- Ascoli, 7th in Serie B
- Atalanta, 17th in Serie A
- Cesena, 5th in Serie B
- Lecce, 18th in Serie A
- Piacenza, 15th in Serie A
- Udinese, 16th in Serie A
- Venezia, 6th in Serie B

At the international stage, the sixteen teams were divided into two groups of eight, each featuring four teams from each country. Clubs played four matches against the teams in their group from the opposite league, two at home and two away. At the end of the international stage, the highest-placed team from each country in each group would advance to a two-legged semi-final, where they would play the other semi-finalist from their own league. A single-match final between the two winners would then follow at Wembley Stadium. During the international stage, English referees were appointed to officiate matches in Italy, while Italian referees oversaw games in England. The groups for the international stage were as follows:

Group A	Group B
Ascoli; Atalanta; Lecce; Notts County; Swindon Town; Tranmere Rovers; Venezia; Wolverhampton Wanderers	Ancona; Cesena; Derby County; Middlesbrough; Piacenza; Sheffield United; Stoke City; Udinese

== International stage ==
=== Group A ===
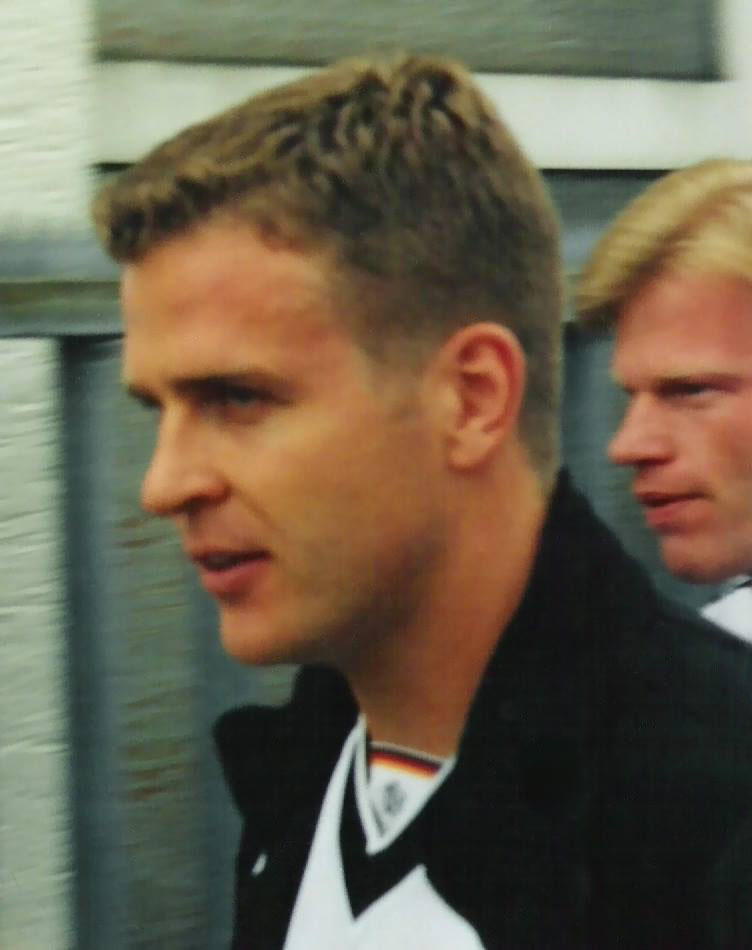
Oliver Bierhoff (pictured c. 1999) scored four goals in the group stage.

Group A began on 24 August 1994 with two matches in Italy and two in England. Notts County made a 1–1 draw at Ascoli, with Paul Devlin scoring a last minute equaliser for the away team after Giuseppe Incocciati had put Ascoli ahead. Meanwhile, about 30 supporters of Wolverhampton Wanderers saw their side win 1–0 at Lecce, with David Kelly scoring on the break late in the match. In England, Giampaolo Saurini's powerful 63rd-minute strike, followed shortly afterwards by a headed goal from Daniele Fortunato, gave Atalanta a 2–0 win over Swindon Town. At Prenton Park, goals from John Aldridge and Chris Malkin gave Tranmere Rovers a 2–0 lead over Venezia, but the latter scored twice themselves, the second coming three minutes from the end, and the match finished 2–2.

In the second round of games, played on 6 September, Tranmere were forced to field several youth players after injuries and international call-ups among their senior side, and they were defeated 2–0 at Atalanta. Devlin was dismissed from his team's home match with Lecce for a second bookable offence, but Phil Turner's 55th-minute goal was nevertheless sufficient to secure a 1–0 win for Notts County. The match between Wolves and Ascoli also saw a red card, with Paolo Benetti of Ascoli dismissed after reacting angrily to a foul by Robbie Dennison on Marco Bizzarri, the Ascoli goalkeeper. Despite playing the final ten minutes with ten men, Ascoli won 1–0. Meanwhile, Swindon were beaten 1–0 at Venezia, leaving Notts County as the leading English team in the group, a point ahead of Wolves. Atalanta led among the Italian teams, with two wins from two.

A third round of games was played on 4 and 5 October, with Tranmere losing 1–0 at home to Ascoli through a Oliver Bierhoff penalty, a result that effectively ended Tranmere's chances of progressing to the semi-final. Atalanta led 1–0 at half-time in their home game with Notts County through Leonardo Rodríguez, but the Italian team were reduced to ten men with 30 minutes to play when Paolo Montero was sent off for a second yellow card, and a Tony Agana equaliser saw the game finish 1–1. Swindon gained their first win in the competition, with Andy Mutch scoring twice in his team's 3–1 win over Lecce, while Wolves were beaten 2–1 at Venezia despite having taken a 1–0 28th-minute lead. The results left Notts County needing a point in their final game to reach the English semi-final, while Ascoli, Atalanta and Venezia were level among the Italian teams, each with two wins and a draw.

The final round of Group A fixtures look place on 15 November. Fabio Pascucci was dismissed for Ascoli after a foul on Scott in his team's home match with Swindon, but Bierhoff scored a hat-trick, and the Italian side won 3–1. Elsewhere in Italy, Orazio Russo scored twice for his team in their 3–0 over Tranmere, helping Lecce to their first win of the competition, and leaving Tranmere without a victory. Notts County led Venezia 2–1, before the latter were awarded a penalty, Dean Yates was sent off for the former for a disputed handball, and Marco Barollo equalised with the resultant kick. Notts County regained the lead through Shaun Murphy, but Barollo scored again, and the match finished 3–3. At Molineux, Atalanta took at early lead against Wolves through Valter Bonacina, but the home team levelled via Lee Mills before half-time, and the match finished 1–1. The results meant Ascoli progressed as the highest-ranking Italian team, and Notts County as the leading English team.

Group A
Pos	Team	Pld	W	D	L	GF	GA	GD	Pts	Qualification
1	Ascoli	4	3	1	0	6	2	+4	10	Advanced to knockout stage
2	Atalanta	4	2	2	0	6	2	+4	8	
3	Venezia	4	2	2	0	8	6	+2	8	
4	Notts County	4	1	3	0	6	5	+1	6	Advanced to knockout stage
5	Wolverhampton Wanderers	4	1	1	2	3	4	−1	4	
6	Swindon Town	4	1	0	3	4	7	−3	3	
7	Lecce	4	1	0	3	4	5	−1	3	
8	Tranmere Rovers	4	0	1	3	2	8	−6	1	

24 August 1994

Ascoli	1–1	Notts County
Incocciati 21'		Devlin 90'

Stadio Cino e Lillo Del Duca, Ascoli Piceno
Attendance: 7,000
24 August 1994

Lecce	0–1	Wolverhampton Wanderers
		Kelly 80'

Stadio Via del mare, Lecce
Attendance: 1,795
24 August 1994

Swindon Town	0–2	Atalanta
		Saurini 63'; Fortunato 66'

County Ground, Swindon
Attendance: 5,167
24 August 1994

Tranmere Rovers	2–2	Venezia
Aldridge 30'; Malkin 45'		Cerbone 66' (pen.); Bonaldi 87'

Prenton Park, Birkenhead
Attendance: 3,012

6 September 1994

Atalanta	2–0	Tranmere Rovers
Montero 20'; Saurini 41'

Stadio Comunale, Bergamo
Attendance: 4,000
6 September 1994

Notts County	1–0	Lecce
Turner 55'

Meadow Lane, Nottingham
Attendance: 2,495
6 September 1994

Venezia	1–0	Swindon Town
Mariani 34'

Stadio Pier Luigi Penzo, Venice
Attendance: 1,325
6 September 1994

Wolverhampton Wanderers	0–1	Ascoli
		Marcato 57'

Molineux Stadium, Wolverhampton
Attendance: 9,599

4 October 1994

Tranmere Rovers	0–1	Ascoli
		Bierhoff 14' (pen.)

Prenton Park, Birkenhead
Attendance: 4,546
5 October 1994

Atalanta	1–1	Notts County
Rodríguez 33'		Agana 70'

Stadio Comunale, Bergamo
Attendance: 5,000
5 October 1994

Swindon Town	3–1	Lecce
Mutch 32', 88'; Scott 44'		Ayew 78'

County Ground, Swindon
Attendance: 2,375
5 October 1994

Venezia	2–1	Wolverhampton Wanderers
Rankine 37' (o.g.); Vieri 58' (pen.)		Venus 28'

Stadio Pier Luigi Penzo, Venice
Attendance: 750

15 November 1994

Ascoli	3–1	Swindon Town
Bierhoff 14', 65', 80'		Hamon 50'

Stadio Cino e Lillo Del Duca, Ascoli Piceno
Attendance: 3,000
15 November 1994

Lecce	3–0	Tranmere Rovers
Russo 47', 52'; Notaristefano 85'

Stadio Via del mare, Lecce
Attendance: 286
15 November 1994

Notts County	3–3	Venezia
Devlin 14'; Marsden 58'; Murphy 77'		Ambrosetti 59'; Barollo 64' (pen.), 83'

Meadow Lane, Nottingham
Attendance: 2,861
15 November 1994

Wolverhampton Wanderers	1–1	Atalanta
Mills 38'		Bonacina 7'

Molineux Stadium, Wolverhampton
Attendance: 7,285

Source for dates, scores, score times and scorers:
Source for attendance:

=== Group B ===
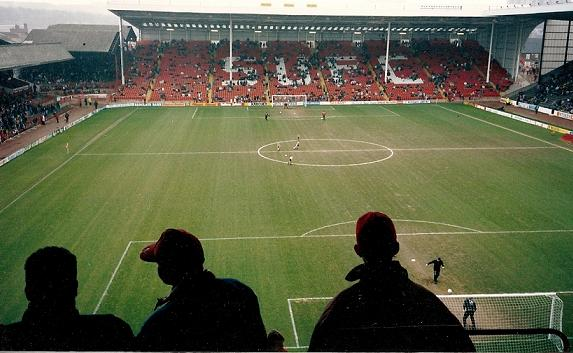
Bramall Lane (pictured in 1992) was the scene of a 15-man brawl during the group stage.

Like Group A, the first round of Group B fixtures look place on 24 August. Derby led 1–0 at Ancona through a Mark Pembridge header, but two defensive lapses in the final ten minutes of the first-half allowed Nicola Caccia to score twice, and Ancona won 2–1. Stoke won 2–0 at Cesena through a John Clark free kick and a late Martin Carruthers strike, while Middlesbrough made a 0–0 draw with Piacenza. Paul Wilkinson was sent off in the 84th minute of the latter for kicking an opponent. At Bramall Lane, the match between Sheffield United and Udinese "degenerated into gruesome farce", with a 15-man brawl and the dismissal of four players (three Sheffield United and one Udinese) and the Sheffield United manager Dave Bassett. The match was close to abandonment, but was seen through to completion and won 2–1 by Udinese.

Three games took place in Group B during September, two of which took place in England. Derby were leading 5–0 at half-time against Cesena, and they eventually won 6–1. Paul Kitson scored four goals during the match, with Steve Hodge scoring Derby's other two. At the Victoria Ground, Caccia scored his third goal of the tournament to give Ancona a 1–0 half-time lead, but Stoke were level through Wayne Biggins shortly into the second half, and the match finished 1–1. Following the experience of their match with Udinese, Sheffield United prevented most their senior team from travelling to Italy, and a radically different line-up made a 2–2 draw at Piacenza. A match between Udinese and Middlesbrough had to be postponed due to the former having to rearrange an abandoned Coppa Italia tie with Fiorentina. Ancona and Stoke respectively ended the round as their country's leading team in the group, both with one win and a draw.

Five Group B matches were played in October, four of which took place on 4 October. The Bolivia international Jaime Moreno scored his first goal for Middlesbrough, a 56th-minute left-footed volley in a 1–1 home draw with Cesena. Piacenza took a 1–0 lead in their home game with Derby via a Antonio De Vitis penalty, before Paul Williams levelled for Derby with a 77th-minute volley. Derby then had the opportunity to take the lead when they were awarded a penalty and Francesco Turrini was dismissed for violent conduct, but Pembridge saw his kick saved, and the match finished 1–1. With Bassett absent, a young Sheffield United side made a 3–3 draw with Ancona, while Stoke scored three goals in six second-half minutes in a 3–1 win at Udinese. Middlesbrough also travelled to Udinese for their rearranged match in October, a 0–0 draw that saw three red cards (two for Udinese, one for Middlesbrough) for poor tackles.

The final round of matches in Group B was played in November. Middlesbrough fielded "a side close to junior level" for their match at Ancona, and were beaten 3–1, with Caccia scoring twice for the home side. Their win meant Ancona progressed as the leading Italian team. Once again fielding an inexperienced team, including one non-contract and two transfer-listed players, Sheffield United won 4–1 at Cesena, while Derby were 3–1 winners at home to Udinese. Derby's win meant Stoke City would need at least a point to progress as the leading English team, and John Butler had them ahead early in their home match with Piacenza. Martin Caruthers scored two goals, one shortly before and one shortly after half-time, and Nigel Gleghorn added a fourth, Stoke advancing with a 4–0 win.

Group B
Pos	Team	Pld	W	D	L	GF	GA	GD	Pts	Qualification
1	Stoke City	4	3	1	0	10	2	+8	10	Advanced to knockout stage
2	Ancona	4	2	2	0	9	6	+3	8	Advanced to knockout stage
3	Derby County	4	2	1	1	11	5	+6	7	
4	Sheffield United	4	1	2	1	10	8	+2	5	
5	Udinese	4	1	1	2	4	7	−3	4	
6	Middlesbrough	4	0	3	1	2	4	−2	3	
7	Piacenza	4	0	3	1	3	7	−4	3	
8	Cesena	4	0	1	3	3	13	−10	1	

24 August 1994

Ancona	2–1	Derby County
Caccia 35', 44'		Pembridge 8'

Stadio del Conero, Ancona
Attendance: 748
24 August 1994

Cesena	0–2	Stoke City
		Clark 38'; Carruthers 78'

Stadio Dino Manuzzi, Cesena
Attendance: 1,065
24 August 1994

Middlesbrough	0–0	Piacenza

Ayresome Park, Middlesbrough
Attendance: 5,348
24 August 1994

Sheffield United	1–2	Udinese
Littlejohn 35'		Marino 17'; Scarchilli 56'

Bramall Lane, Sheffield
Attendance: 7,497

6 September 1994

Derby County	6–1	Cesena
Kitson 16', 29', 31', 73'; Hodge 8', 38'		Ambrosini 79'

Baseball Ground, Derby
Attendance: 2,010
6 September 1994

Piacenza	2–2	Sheffield United
Brioschi 18'; Suppa 53'		Carr 6'; Gannon 57'

Stadio Leonardo Garilli, Piacenza
Attendance: 4,744
6 September 1994

Stoke City	1–1	Ancona
Biggins 50'		Caccia 43'

Victoria Ground, Stoke-on-Trent
Attendance: 3,330

5 October 1994

Middlesbrough	1–1	Cesena
Moreno 56'		Hübner 64'

Ayresome Park, Middlesbrough
Attendance: 3,273
5 October 1994

Piacenza	1–1	Derby County
De Vitis 65' (pen.)		Williams 77'

Stadio Leonardo Garilli, Piacenza
Attendance: 1,710
5 October 1994

Sheffield United	3–3	Ancona
Ward 66'; Battersby 24'; A. Scott 81'		Baglieri 29'; Catanese 48'; De Angelis 70'

Bramall Lane, Sheffield
Attendance: 1,827
5 October 1994

Udinese	1–3	Stoke City
Pizzi 29'		Downing 69'; Biggins 74'; Butler 74'

Stadio Friuli, Udine
Attendance: 1,306
18 October 1994

Udinese	0–0	Middlesbrough

Stadio Friuli, Udine
Attendance: 300

15 November 1994

Cesena	1–4	Sheffield United
Bombardini 30'		A. Scott 35', 52'; Reed 60'; Hawthorne 86'

Stadio Dino Manuzzi, Cesena
Attendance: 3,200
15 November 1994

Derby County	3–1	Udinese
Johnson 19', 72'; Stallard 20'		Bertotto 50'

Baseball Ground, Derby
Attendance: 1,562
15 November 1994

Stoke City	4–0	Piacenza
Butler 12'; Carruthers 37', 50'; Gleghorn 85'

Victoria Ground, Stoke-on-Trent
Attendance: 7,240
15 November 1994

Ancona	3–1	Middlesbrough
Caccia 65', 89'; Artistico 81'		Morris 10'

Stadio del Conero, Ancona
Attendance: 1,500

Source for dates, scores, score times and scorers:.
Source for attendance:

== Knockout stage ==
=== Semi-finals ===
The Italian semi-final was played in December between Ancona and Ascoli. The first leg was played at Ascoli's Stadio Cino e Lillo Del Duca, and was won 1–0 by Ancona via a 33rd-minute goal from the defender Carlo Cornacchia. In the second leg, a 70th minute goal from Giuseppe Incocciati gave Ascoli a 1–0 lead that forced extra time, and Incocciati scored a second in the 101st minute. Felice Centofanti pulled a goal back for Ancona in the final seconds, but the final whistle went shortly afterwards, and Ascoli advanced to the final via the away goals rule.

The English semi-final between Notts County and Stoke City followed in January. The first leg at Notts County's Meadow Lane ground ended 0–0, with the home side having only one shot on target, and Stoke failing to test the Notts goalkeeper. The second leg also finished 0–0 after extra time, and a penalty shoot-out was therefore required to decide the winner. The goalkeeper Jason Kearton made two saves for Notts County, and his side won the shoot-out 3–2 to qualify for a second successive Anglo-Italian Cup final.

Italian semi-final

8 December 1994

Ascoli	0–1	Ancona
		Cornacchia 33'

Stadio Cino e Lillo Del Duca, Ascoli Piceno
Attendance: 3,705

8 December 1994

Ancona	1–2 (a.e.t.)	Ascoli
Centofanti 120'		Incocciati 70', 101'

Stadio del Conero, Ancona
Attendance: 4,311

2–2 on aggregate; Ascoli won on away goals.

English semi-final

24 January 1995

Notts County	0–0	Stoke City

Meadow Lane, Nottingham
Attendance: 5,135

31 January 1995

Stoke City	0–0 (a.e.t.)	Notts County
Penalties
	2–3

Victoria Ground, Stoke-on-Trent
Attendance: 10,781

0–0 on aggregate; Notts County won 3–2 on penalties.

Source for dates, scores, score times and scorers:.
Source for attendance:

=== Final ===
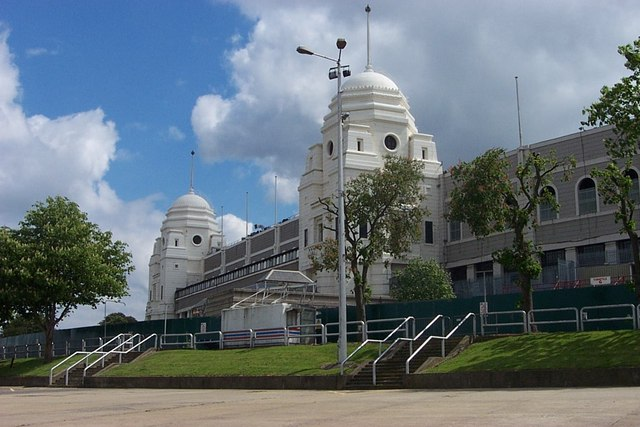
The original Wembley Stadium (pictured in 2002) hosted the final.

The final was played at Wembley Stadium on 19 March. The match was attended by 11,704 spectators, mostly Notts County supporters, but including over 1,000 supporters of Ascoli, and was refereed by Charles Agius of Malta. Notts County took the lead after 14 minutes, when a long throw-in from Andy Legg deceived the Ascoli goalkeeper Marco Bizzarri and went straight over him into the net. Television replays showed that Legg's throw-in did not make any contact before it crossed the line, but a goal was credited to Tony Agana, who was adjudged to have got a touch, though David Stapleton of the Nottingham Evening Post thought it a Bizzarri own goal. Ascoli made the score 1–1 in the 33rd minute through Walter Mirabelli, who took advantage of a mix-up in the Notts County defence to equalise from close range, but Notts County retook the lead shortly before half-time through a Devon White header. There was no further scoring in the second half, Legg seeing a goal from a powerful free-kick disallowed, and the English side won the match 2–1.

19 March 1995

Notts County (England)	2–1	(Italy) Ascoli
Agana 13'; White 45'	Report	Mirabelli 33'

Wembley Stadium, London
Attendance: 11,704
Referee: C. Agius (Malta)

Notts County
GK	1	(England) Steve Cherry	(substituted off) 74'
DF	2	(England) Chris Short
DF	6	(Jamaica) Michael Johnson	(substituted off) 74'
DF	5	(Australia) Shaun Murphy
DF	3	(England) Gary Mills
MF	4	(England) Phil Turner
FW	7	(Scotland) Paul Devlin
MF	10	(England) Michael Simpson
MF	11	(Wales) Andy Legg
FW	8	(England) Devon White
FW	9	(England) Tony Agana	(substituted off) 87'
Substitutes:
GK		(England) Paul Reece	(substituted on) 74'
DF		(Nigeria) Michael Emenalo	(substituted on) 74'
DF		(England) Tommy Gallagher	(substituted on) 87'
Manager:
(England) Howard Kendall

Ascoli
GK	1	(Italy) Marco Bizzarri
DF	6	(Italy) Francesco Zanoncelli
DF	5	(Italy) Carlo Pascucci
DF	2	(Italy) Paolo Benetti
MF	7	(Italy) Jonatan Binotto	(substituted off) 77'
MF	10	(Italy) Massimiliano Favo
DF	4	(Italy) Luca Marcato
MF	8	(Italy) Giovanni Bosi
DF	3	(Italy) Carmelo Mancuso	(substituted off) 62'
FW	9	(Germany) Oliver Bierhoff
FW	11	(Italy) Walter Mirabelli
Substitutes:
MF		(Italy) Manuel Milana	(substituted on) 62'
MF		(Italy) Michele Menolascina	(substituted on) 77'
Manager:
(Italy) Alberto Bigon

== Statistics ==
=== Goalscorers ===
A total of 98 goals were scored during the tournament. Excluding one own goal, there were 71 different goalscorers. The top scorer was Nicola Caccia of Ancona, who found the net five times during the competition.

5 goals

- Nicola Caccia ( Ancona)

4 goals

- Oliver Bierhoff ( Ascoli)
- Paul Kitson ( Derby County)

3 goals

- Martin Carruthers ( Stoke City)
- Giuseppe Incocciati ( Ascoli)
- Andy Scott ( Sheffield United)

2 goals

- Tony Agana ( Notts County)
- Marco Barollo ( Venezia)
- Wayne Biggins ( Stoke City)
- John Butler ( Middlesbrough)
- Paul Devlin ( Notts County)
- Steve Hodge ( Derby County)
- Tommy Johnson ( Derby County)
- Andy Mutch ( Swindon Town)
- Orazio Russo ( Lecce)
- Giampaolo Saurini ( Atalanta)

1 goal

- John Aldridge ( Tranmere Rovers)
- Massimo Ambrosini ( Cesena)
- Gabriele Ambrosetti ( Venezia)
- Edoardo Artistico ( Ancona)
- Kwame Ayew ( Lecce)
- Christian Baglieri ( Ancona)
- Tony Battersby ( Sheffield United)
- Valerio Bertotto ( Udinese)
- Davide Bombardini ( Cesena)
- Valter Bonacina ( Atalanta)
- Enio Bonaldi ( Venezia)
- Massimo Brioschi ( Piacenza)
- Franz Carr ( Sheffield United)
- Tarcisio Catanese ( Ancona)
- Felice Centofanti ( Ancona)
- Rafaele Cerbone ( Venezia)
- John Clark ( Stoke City)
- Carlo Cornacchia ( Ancona)
- Gianluca De Angelis ( Ancona)
- Antonio De Vitis ( Piacenza)
- Keith Downing ( Middlesbrough)
- Daniele Fortunato ( Atalanta)
- John Gannon ( Sheffield United)
- Nigel Gleghorn ( Stoke City)
- Chris Hamon ( Swindon Town)
- Mark Hawthorne ( Sheffield United)
- Dario Hübner ( Cesena)
- David Kelly ( Wolverhampton Wanderers)
- Adrian Littlejohn ( Sheffield United)
- Chris Malkin ( Tranmere Rovers)
- Luca Marcato ( Ascoli)
- Pietro Mariani ( Venezia)
- Francesco Marino ( Udinese)
- Lee Mills ( Wolverhampton Wanderers)
- Valter Mirabelli ( Ascoli)
- Chris Marsden ( Notts County)
- Paolo Montero ( Atalanta)
- Jaime Moreno ( Middlesbrough)
- Chris Morris ( Middlesbrough)
- Shaun Murphy ( Notts County)
- Egidio Notaristefano ( Lecce)
- Fausto Pizzi ( Udinese)
- Mark Pembridge ( Derby County)
- John Reed ( Sheffield United)
- Leonardo Rodríguez ( Ancona)
- Alessio Scarchilli ( Udinese)
- Keith Scott ( Swindon Town)
- Mark Stallard ( Derby County)
- Pasquale Suppa ( Piacenza)
- Phil Turner ( Notts County)
- Mark Venus ( Wolverhampton Wanderers)
- Christian Vieri ( Venezia)
- Mitch Ward ( Sheffield United)
- Devon White ( Notts County)
- Paul Williams ( Derby County)

1 own goal

- Mark Rankine (against Venezia)

== Reception and aftermath ==
The Anglo-Italian Cup struggled to generate interest, and there was criticism for the standard of the refereeing, low attendances, and the perceived distraction it caused to the league season. Some clubs used the event as an opportunity to field fringe players. The competition had also developed a reputation for violence, "more like the Aggro-Italian Cup" as one newspaper put it, and there were several contentious incidents during the 1994–95 edition. Glyn Hodges, who was one of the three Sheffield United players dismissed in their opening game with Udinese, later recalled that the experience caused Dave Bassett, his team's manager, to abandon any interest in progressing. There was speculation in the press about whether the tournament would continue, but it did for one more season, being cancelled in 1996 when the two leagues were unable to agree on scheduling.

Notts County were ultimately the only English side to win the competition in the 1990s. It was Notts County's first triumph in a cup competition since winning the 1894 FA Cup final 101 years earlier, and proved a high point in a mostly poor season for the club which saw three managerial changes, an unsettled playing side, and culminated in relegation to the Football League Second Division, something which prevented them from defending their title the following season. Ascoli were also relegated following the 1994–95 season, dropping to Serie C, and their semi-final victory over Ancona is regarded as one of their best results in a difficult period for the club. The opportunity to play at the original Wembley Stadium is also considered a highlight in Ascoli's history.
