= 1993–94 Piacenza Calcio season =

Piacenza
1993–94 season
- Manager: Luigi Cagni
- Serie A: 15th
- Coppa Italia: Quarter-finals
- Top goalscorer: Gianpietro Piovani (6)

Piacenza Calcio did not manage to renew their stay in Serie A, in the club's debut season at the top level of Italian football. The performance from the team was not too poor however, considering it was only a point from the 14th place that would have kept Piacenza up.

== Squad ==
=== Goalkeepers ===
- (Italy) Massimo Taibi
- (Italy) Rino Gandini

=== Defenders ===
- (Italy) Cleto Polonia
- (Italy) Stefano Maccoppi
- (Italy) Settimio Lucci
- (Italy) Antonio Carannante
- (Italy) Massimo Brioschi
- (Italy) Roberto Chiti
- (Italy) Andrea Di Cintio

=== Midfielders ===
- (Italy) Luigi Erbaggio
- (Italy) Francesco Turrini
- (Italy) Pasquale Suppa
- (Italy) Giorgio Papais
- (Italy) Daniele Moretti
- (Italy) Agostino Iacobelli
- (Italy) Giuseppe Ferazzoli
- (Italy) Gianpietro Piovani

=== Attackers ===
- (Italy) Marco Ferrante
- (Italy) Antonio De Vitis
- (Italy) Simone Inzaghi

== Competitions ==
=== Serie A ===
==== League table ====
Pos	Team	Pld	W	D	L	GF	GA	GD	Pts	Qualification or relegation
13	Internazionale (Note: Internazionale qualified to 1994–95 UEFA Cup as defending champions.)	34	11	9	14	46	45	+1	31	Qualification to UEFA Cup
14	Reggiana	34	10	11	13	29	37	−8	31	
15	Piacenza (R)	34	8	14	12	32	43	−11	30	Relegation to Serie B
16	Udinese (R)	34	7	14	13	35	48	−13	28	Relegation to Serie B
17	Atalanta (R)	34	5	11	18	35	65	−30	21	Relegation to Serie B

Source: 1993–94 Serie A, RSSSF.com, Soccerway
Rules for classification: 1) Points; 2) Head-to-head points; 3) Head-to-head goal difference; 4) Goal difference; 5) Goals scored; 6) Draw. (Note: Head-to-head record is used only after all the matches between the teams in question have been played).
(R) Relegated

==== Matches ====
29 August 1993 1	Piacenza	0–3	Torino	Piacenza
		Report	Carbone 25'; Silenzi 64'; Poggi 87'	Stadium: Galleana

5 September 1993 2	Sampdoria	2–1	Piacenza	Genoa
	Jugović 35'; Mancini 45' (pen.)	Report	Bucchioni 42' (o.g.)	Stadium: Stadio Luigi Ferraris

8 September 1993 3	Piacenza	0–0	Milan	Piacenza
		Report		Stadium: Galleana

12 September 1993 4	Reggiana	1–1	Piacenza	Reggio Emilia
	Morello 46'	Report	Carannante 27'	Stadium: Mirabello

19 September 1993 5	Piacenza	2–1	Lecce	Piacenza
	Ceramicola 58' (o.g.); Turrini 88'	Report	Baldieri 46'	Stadium: Galleana

26 September 1993 6	Inter	2–0	Piacenza	Milan
	Bergkamp 16' (pen.); Sosa 83'	Report		Stadium: Giuseppe Meazza

3 October 1993 7	Piacenza	1–1	Cagliari	Piacenza
	Piovani 58'	Report	Luís Oliveira 74'	Stadium: Galleana

17 October 1993 8	Lazio	1–0	Piacenza	Rome
	Signori 90' (pen.)	Report		Stadium: Olimpico

24 October 1993 9	Genoa	0–1	Piacenza	Genoa
		Report	Turrini 60'	Stadium: Luigi Ferraris

31 October 1993 10	Piacenza	1–1	Napoli	Piacenza
	Papais 28'	Report	Bia 18'	Stadium: Galleana

7 November 1993 11	Atalanta	0–0	Piacenza	Bergamo
		Report		Stadium: Comunale

21 November 1993 12	Piacenza	0–0	Udinese	Piacenza
		Report		Stadium: Galleana

28 November 1993 13	Piacenza	5–4	Foggia	Piacenza
	Piovani 1'; Ferrante 18'; Ferazzoli 32'; Turrini 71', 84'	Report	Roy 15', 68'; Stroppa 43' (pen.); Cappioli 72'	Stadium: Galleana

5 December 1993 14	Cremonese	4–0	Piacenza	Cremona
	Tentoni 18', 54'; Dezotti 44' (pen.); Florijančič 81'	Report		Stadium: Giovanni Zini

12 December 1993 15	Piacenza	1–0	Roma	Piacenza
	Piovani 59'	Report		Stadium: Galleana

19 December 1993 16	Juventus	2–0	Piacenza	Turin
	Conte 61'; Ravanelli 87'	Report		Stadium: delle Alpi

2 January 1994 17	Piacenza	1–1	Parma	Piacenza
	Ferrante 21'	Report	Balleri 39'	Stadium: Galleana

9 January 1994 18	Torino	1–0	Piacenza	Turin
	Chiti 49' (o.g.)	Report		Stadium: delle Alpi

16 January 1994 19	Piacenza	2–1	Sampdoria	Piacenza
	Piovani 31'; Ferrante 67'	Report	Lombardo 84' (pen.)	Stadium: Galleana

23 January 1994 20	Milan	2–0	Piacenza	Milan
	Massaro 72'; Papin 76'	Report		Stadium: San Siro

30 January 1994 21	Piacenza	3–2	Reggiana	Piacenza
	Iacobelli 47'; De Agostini 62' (o.g.); Moretti 90'	Report	Papais 8' (o.g.); Morello 73'	Stadium: Galleana

6 February 1994 22	Lecce	1–1	Piacenza	Lecce
	Russo 51'	Report	Brioschi 79'	Stadium: Via del Mare

13 February 1994 23	Piacenza	2–1	Inter	Piacenza
	Orlando 13' (o.g.); Turrini 52'	Report	Battistini 47'	Stadium: Galleana

20 February 1994 24	Cagliari	2–0	Piacenza	Cagliari
	Luís Oliveira 60'; Napoli 74'	Report		Stadium: Sant'Elia

27 February 1994 25	Piacenza	1–2	Lazio	Piacenza
	Piovani 59'	Report	Negro 60'; Di Matteo 72'	Stadium: Galleana

6 March 1994 26	Piacenza	1–1	Genoa	Piacenza
	Papais 31' (pen.)	Report	Skuhravý 8'	Stadium: Galleana

13 March 1994 27	Napoli	0–0	Piacenza	Naples
		Report		Stadium: San Paolo

20 March 1994 28	Piacenza	4–0	Atalanta	Piacenza
	Moretti 41'; Papais 44' (pen.); Piovani 47'; Iacobelli 83'	Report		Stadium: Galleana

25 March 1994 29	Udinese	2–2	Piacenza	Udine
	Helveg 4'; Calori 81'	Report	Papais 42' (pen.); Ferrante 54'	Stadium: Friuli

2 April 1994 30	Foggia	1–0	Piacenza	Foggia
	Stroppa 18'	Report		Stadium: Pino Zaccharia

9 April 1994 31	Piacenza	1–1	Cremonese	Piacenza
	De Vitis 40'	Report	Gualco 76'	Stadium: Galleana

17 April 1994 32	Roma	3–1	Piacenza	Rome
	Rizzitelli 22'; Carannante 26' (o.g.); Carboni 39'	Report	Iacobelli 45'	Stadium: Olimpico

24 April 1994 33	Piacenza	0–0	Juventus	Piacenza
		Report		Stadium: Galleana

29 April 1994 34	Parma	0–0	Piacenza	Parma
		Report		Stadium: Ennio Tardini

==== Top scorers ====
- (Italy) Gianpietro Piovani 6
- (Italy) Francesco Turrini 5
- (Italy) Giorgio Papais 4 (3)
- (Italy) Marco Ferrante 4
- (Italy) Agostino Iacobelli 3

=== Coppa Italia ===
Second round

6 October 1993	Piacenza	3–1	Perugia	Piacenza
	Ferrante; Piovani; Dondoni o.g.'		Cornacchini	Stadium: Galleana

27 October 1993	Perugia	1–0	Piacenza	Perugia
	Cornacchini

Eightfinals

10 November 1993	Milan	1–1	Piacenza	Milan
	Orlando 25'		Maccoppi 84'	Stadium: San Siro; Referee: Roberto Bettin

15 December 1993	Piacenza	1–0	Milan	Galleana, Piacenza
	Piovani 90'			Referee: Pierluigi Collina

Quarterfinals

6 January 1994	Piacenza	2–2	Torino	Piacenza
	Ferazzoli; Piovani		Annoni; Venturin	Stadium: Galleana

27 January 1994	Torino	2–1	Piacenza	Turin
	Sinigaglia; Venturin		Piovani	Stadium: delle Alpi

== Sources ==
- RSSSF – Italy 1993/94
