= 1995–96 Piacenza Calcio season =

Piacenza
1995–96 season
- Manager: Luigi Cagni
- Serie A: 14th
- Coppa Italia: Second Round
- Top goalscorer: Nicola Caccia (14)

Piacenza Calcio managed to secure a penultimate-round survival in their second attempt to establish themselves in Serie A. Much thanks to the presence of 14-times goal scorer Nicola Caccia and creative midfielder Gianpietro Piovani, plus a tight defensive line, Piacenza had five points in hand to the relegated Bari.

== Squad ==
=== Goalkeepers ===
- (Italy) Massimo Taibi
- (Italy) Luigi Simoni

=== Defenders ===
- (Italy) Cleto Polonia
- (Italy) Settimio Lucci
- (Italy) Stefano Maccoppi
- (Italy) Stefano Rossini
- (Italy) Mirko Conte
- (Italy) Roberto Lorenzini
- (Italy) Massimo Brioschi
- (Italy) Simone Corradi
- (Italy) Cristian Trapella

=== Midfielders ===
- (Italy) Eusebio Di Francesco
- (Italy) Eugenio Corini
- (Italy) Angelo Carbone
- (Italy) Francesco Turrini
- (Italy) Daniele Moretti
- (Italy) Gianpietro Piovani

=== Attackers ===
- (Italy) Nicola Caccia
- (Italy) Massimiliano Cappellini
- (Italy) Gabriele Ballotta

== Serie A ==
Pos	Team	Pld	W	D	L	GF	GA	GD	Pts	Qualification or relegation
12	Napoli	34	10	11	13	28	41	−13	41	
13	Atalanta	34	11	6	17	38	50	−12	39	
14	Piacenza	34	9	10	15	31	48	−17	37	
15	Bari (R)	34	8	8	18	49	71	−22	32	Relegation to Serie B
16	Torino (R)	34	6	11	17	28	46	−18	29	Relegation to Serie B

Source: 1995–96 Serie A, RSSSF.com, Soccerway
Rules for classification: 1) Points; 2) Head-to-head points; 3) Head-to-head goal difference; 4) Goal difference; 5) Goals scored; 6) Draw. (Note: Head-to-head record is used only after all the matches between the teams in question have been played).
(R) Relegated

=== Matches ===
1	Lazio	4–1	Piacenza
	Signori 32'; Esposito 48, 73'; Casiraghi 78' (pen.)		Caccia 81' (pen.)

2	Piacenza	0–4	Juventus
			Vialli 45, 86'; Torricelli 60'; Ravanelli 74'

3	Inter	0–0	Piacenza

4	Piacenza	3–2	Bari
	Caccia 43, 48'; Piovani 51'		Protti 84'; Pedone 90'

5	Atalanta	2–0	Piacenza
	Piovani 5' (o.g.); Rossini 50' (o.g.)

6	Piacenza	3–2	Sampdoria
	Corini 13'; Piovani 18'; Caccia 20'		Maniero 47'; Mancini 90'

7	Piacenza	0–1	Napoli
			Taibi 69' (o.g.)

8	Parma	3–2	Piacenza
	Zola 23, 61'; F. Inzaghi 90'		A. Carbone 53'; Caccia 82' (pen.)

9	Vicenza	1–1	Piacenza
	Maini 88'		Piovani 57'

10	Piacenza	1–0	Roma
	Di Francesco 18'

11	Milan	3–0	Piacenza
	Savićević 7'; Panucci 25'; Maldini 77'

12	Piacenza	1–1	Cagliari
	Caccia 54'		Luís Oliveira 57'

13	Torino	4–2	Piacenza
	Rizzitelli 32' (pen.), 45'; Abedi Pele 79'; Bernardini 85'		Caccia 60, 89'

14	Piacenza	2–1	Cremonese
	Caccia 19'; Piovani 45'		Tentoni 88'

15	Padova	1–1	Piacenza
	Gabrieli 30'		Piovani 65'

16	Piacenza	0–2	Udinese
			Bierhoff 13'; Matrecano 87'

17	Fiorentina	2–1	Piacenza
	Robbiati 28'; Baiano 38'		Turrini 35'

18	Piacenza	2–1	Lazio
	Piovani 67'; Caccia 79'		Bokšić 49'

19	Juventus	2–0	Piacenza
	Conte 34'; Ferrara 61'

20	Piacenza	1–0	Inter
	Carbone 90'

21	Bari	0–0	Piacenza

22	Piacenza	2–2	Atalanta
	Caccia 30'; Piovani 61'		Vieri 17'; Pisani 67'

23	Sampdoria	3–0	Piacenza
	Mihajlović 27'; Chiesa 49'; Mancini 65'

24	Napoli	0–0	Piacenza

25	Piacenza	2–1	Parma
	Caccia 2', 45' (pen.)		Arioli 71'

26	Piacenza	0–1	Vicenza
			M. Rossi 29'

27	Roma	2–1	Piacenza
	Delvecchio 16'; Cappioli 24'		Cappellini 51'

28	Piacenza	0–2	Milan
			Desailly 51'; Simone 66'

29	Cagliari	0–0	Piacenza

30	Piacenza	1–0	Torino
	Piovani 1'

31	Cremonese	0–0	Piacenza

32	Piacenza	4–0	Padova
	Caccia 6'; Cappellini 22'; Di Francesco 46'; Moretti 48'

33	Udinese	0–0	Piacenza

34	Piacenza	0–1	Fiorentina
			Corini 21' (o.g.)

=== Top scorers ===
- (Italy) Nicola Caccia 14
- (Italy) Gianpietro Piovani 8
- (Italy) Eusebio Di Francesco 2
- (Italy) Angelo Carbone 2
- (Italy) Massimiliano Cappellini 2

== Sources ==
- RSSSF - Italy 1995/96
