= Middlesbrough F.C. in European football =

English club in European football

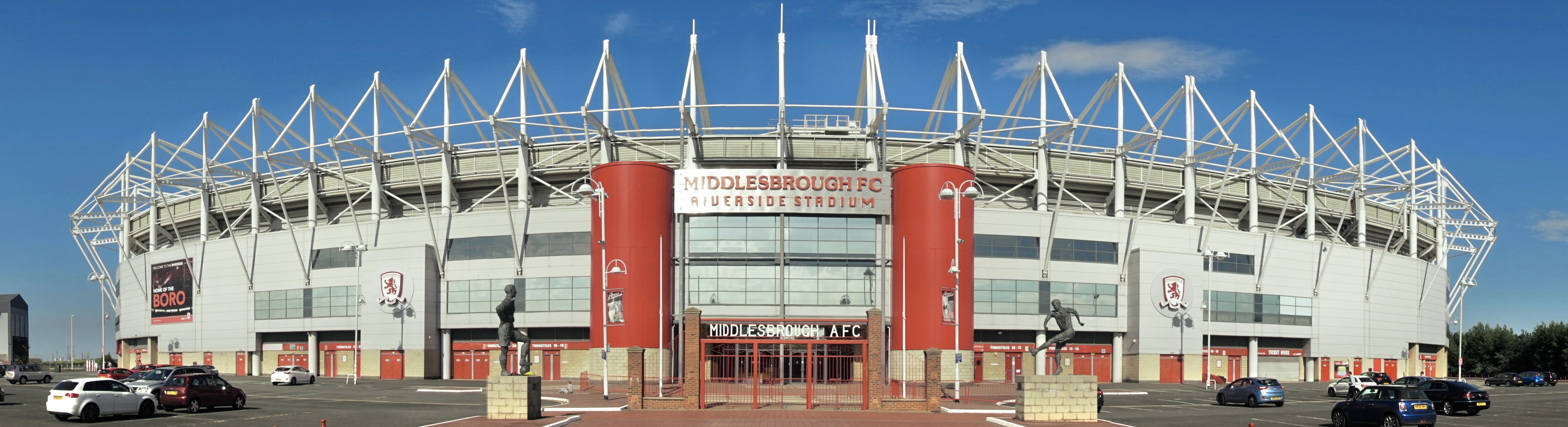
- The Riverside Stadium, current home of Middlesbrough F.C.
- Club: Middlesbrough
- Seasons played: 2
- First entry: 2004–05 UEFA Cup
- Latest entry: 2005–06 UEFA Cup

Middlesbrough Football Club is an English football club based in Middlesbrough, North Yorkshire. The club was founded in 1876 and made their European debut in 1970 as a participant in the 1970 Anglo-Italian Cup. In 2004 they qualified for their first major European competition the 2004–05 UEFA Cup. In 2006 they reached the final of the 2005–06 UEFA Cup.

== History ==
=== 2004–05 UEFA Cup ===
Middlesbrough qualified for the first round of the 2004–05 UEFA Cup after winning the 2003–04 Football League Cup. Their first match was at home to Baník Ostrava, winning 3–0 after one goal from Jimmy Floyd Hasselbaink, and two goals from Mark Viduka. The away leg ended in a 1–1 draw after a late goal from James Morrison. For the group stage Middlesbrough were drawn in group E with Egaleo, Lazio, Villarreal and Partizan. Middlesbrough made a good start to the group with a 1–0 win over Egaleo, followed by a 2–0 win over Lazio. Their away match against Villarreal was less successful, ending in a 2–0 defeat. For the final game however Middlesbrough beat Partizan 3–0, finishing first in group E.

For the round of 32 Middlesbrough were drawn against Grazer AK. During the first leg Middlesbrough were only able to achieve a 2–2 draw, with Grazer twice coming back from being a goal down. The second leg went better, though Middlesbrough were initially 1–0 down after a goal from Mario Bazina. A goal from James Morrison levelled the score before half-time, followed by the winning goal from Hasselbaink during the second half, allowing Middlesbrough to advance 4–3 on aggregate. For the round of 16 Middlesbrough were drawn against Sporting CP. The first leg was one of mixed feelings for the home side as Middlesbrough ended up 3–0 down. But two late goals from Joseph-Désiré Job and Chris Riggott restored some hope. Middlesbrough were unable to score in their away leg, and were eliminated 4–2 on aggregate after a late goal from Pedro Barbosa.

=== 2005–06 UEFA Cup ===
Middlesbrough finished the 2004–05 Premier League in 7th place and subsequently qualified for the first round of the 2005–06 UEFA Cup. They were drawn against Skoda Xanthi, winning the first leg 2–0 after goals from George Boateng and Mark Viduka. This was followed by a 0–0 draw during the second leg. For the group stage Middlesbrough were drawn in group D along with AZ, Litex Lovech, Dnipro Dnipropetrovsk and Grasshopper. The group stage went well with a 1–0 win against Grasshopper, followed by a 3–0 win over Dnipro Dnipropetrovsk. Away to AZ, Middlesbrough only managed a 0–0 draw, but finished the group stage with a 2–0 win over Litex Lovech.

For the round of 32 Middlesbrough were drawn against VfB Stuttgart, and scored two away goals during the first leg. Despite a 1–0 defeat at home during the second leg after an early goal from Christian Tiffert, Middlesbrough advanced on away goals. For the round of 16 Middlesbrough came up against A.S. Roma, winning the first leg 1–0 after a penalty from Yakubu. During the second leg Middlesbrough again took the lead after a goal from Hasselbaink, though Roma were able to equalize after a goal from Mancini. Roma then took the lead after being awarded a penalty, scored by Mancini. The final score was 2–1, though Middlesbrough again advanced on away goals. Middlesbrough meet FC Basel in the Quarter Finals, losing the first leg 2–0 after goals from Matías Delgado and Philipp Degen. During the second leg Middlesbrough initially went 1–0 behind, before making a memorable comeback. Mark Viduka scored before half-time to level the score, before scoring again in the second half. Hasselbaink scored a third goal for the home side, before Maccarone scored the winning goal in the last minute, allowing Middlesbrough to advance 4–3 on aggregate. In the Semi-finals Middlesbrough faced FC Steaua București, again losing the first leg, this time 1–0 after a goal from Nicolae Dică. During the second leg Middlesbrough again went behind after another goal from Dică and a further goal from Dorin Goian, though Maccarone was able to find the net before half-time. During the second half Middlesbrough would complete another unpredictable comeback, with Viduka and Riggott both scoring, followed by the winning goal from Maccarone.

Middlesbrough were unable to score during the final, going behind in the first-half after a goal from Luís Fabiano. Despite making several changes during the second half, the match ended in a 4–0 defeat for Middlesbrough.

== UEFA competitions ==
Note: Results are given with Middlesbrough score listed first.

Season	Competition	Round	Country	Club	Home Leg	Away Leg	Aggregate
2004-05	UEFA Cup	First Round	(Czech Republic)	Baník Ostrava	3–0	1–1	4–1
2004-05	UEFA Cup	Group Stage	(Greece)	Egaleo	N/A	1–0	1st
2004-05	UEFA Cup	Group Stage	(Italy)	Lazio	2–0	N/A	1st
2004-05	UEFA Cup	Group Stage	(Spain)	Villarreal	N/A	0–2	1st
2004-05	UEFA Cup	Group Stage	(Serbia and Montenegro)	Partizan	3–0	N/A	1st
2004-05	UEFA Cup	Round of 32	(Austria)	Grazer AK	2–1	2–2	4–3
2004-05	UEFA Cup	Round of 16	(Portugal)	Sporting CP	2–3	0–1	2-4
2005-06	UEFA Cup	First Round	(Greece)	Skoda Xanthi	2–0	0–0	2–0
2005-06	UEFA Cup	Group Stage	(Switzerland)	Grasshoppers Zürich	N/A	1–0	1st
2005-06	UEFA Cup	Group Stage	(Ukraine)	Dnipro Dnipropetrovsk	3–0	N/A	1st
2005-06	UEFA Cup	Group Stage	(Netherlands)	AZ	N/A	0–0	1st
2005-06	UEFA Cup	Group Stage	(Bulgaria)	Litex Lovech	2–0	N/A	1st
2005-06	UEFA Cup	Round of 32	(Germany)	Stuttgart	0–1	2–1	2–2(a)
2005-06	UEFA Cup	Round of 16	(Italy)	Roma	1–0	1–2	2–2(a)
2005-06	UEFA Cup	Quarter-finals	(Switzerland)	Basel	4–1	0–2	4–3
2005-06	UEFA Cup	Semi-finals	(Romania)	Steaua Bucharest	4–2	0–1	4–3
2005-06	UEFA Cup	Final	(Spain)	Sevilla	0–4		

== Non-UEFA competitions ==
Note: Results are given with Middlesbrough score listed first.

Season	Competition	Round	Country	Club	Home Leg	Away Leg	Aggregate
1970	Anglo-Italian Cup	Group 2	(Italy)	Roma	1–0	N/A	2nd
1970	Anglo-Italian Cup	Group 2	(Italy)	Vicenza	2–0	N/A	2nd
1970	Anglo-Italian Cup	Group 2	(Italy)	Roma	N/A	1–1	2nd
1970	Anglo-Italian Cup	Group 2	(Italy)	Vicenza	N/A	2–2	2nd
1975-76	Anglo-Scottish Cup	Group 1	(England)	Sunderland	3–2	N/A	1st
1975-76	Anglo-Scottish Cup	Group 1	(England)	Carlisle	4–1	N/A	1st
1975-76	Anglo-Scottish Cup	Group 1	(England)	Newcastle	N/A	2–2	1st
1975-76	Anglo-Scottish Cup	Quarter-finals	(Scotland)	Aberdeen	2–0	5–2	7–2
1975-76	Anglo-Scottish Cup	Semi-finals	(England)	Mansfield Town	3–0	2–0	5–0
1975-76	Anglo-Scottish Cup	Final	(England)	Fulham	1–0	0–0	1–0
1993-94	Anglo-Italian Cup	Preliminary round	(England)	Grimsby Town	N/A	1–2	1st
1993-94	Anglo-Italian Cup	Preliminary round	(England)	Barnsley	3–0	N/A	1st
1993-94	Anglo-Italian Cup	Group A	(Italy)	Pisa	N/A	1–3	7th
1993-94	Anglo-Italian Cup	Group A	(Italy)	Ancona	0–0	N/A	7th
1993-94	Anglo-Italian Cup	Group A	(Italy)	Ascoli	N/A	0–3	7th
1993-94	Anglo-Italian Cup	Group A	(Italy)	Brescia	N/A	0–1	7th
1994-95	Anglo-Italian Cup	Group B	(Italy)	Piacenza	0–0	N/A	6th
1994-95	Anglo-Italian Cup	Group B	(Italy)	Cesena	1–1	N/A	6th
1994-95	Anglo-Italian Cup	Group B	(Italy)	Udinese	N/A	0–0	6th
1994-95	Anglo-Italian Cup	Group B	(Italy)	Ancona	N/A	1–3	6th

== Overall record ==
=== By competition ===
Information correct as of 15 February 2016.

Competition	Seasons	Pld	W	D	L	GF	GA	GD
UEFA Cup	2	25	13	4	8	36	24	+12
Anglo-Italian Cup	3	14	3	6	5	13	16	–3
Anglo-Scottish Cup	1	9	7	2	0	22	7	+15
Total	6	48	23	12	13	71	47	+24

=== By country ===
==== UEFA competitions ====
Country	Pld	W	D	L	GF	GA	GD	Win%
Austria	2	1	1	0	4	3	+1	50.00
Bulgaria	1	1	0	0	2	0	+2	100.00
Czech Republic	2	1	1	0	4	1	+3	50.00
Germany	2	1	0	1	2	2	+0	50.00
Greece	3	2	1	0	3	0	+3	66.67
Italy	3	2	0	1	4	2	+2	66.67
Netherlands	1	0	1	0	0	0	+0	0.00
Portugal	2	0	0	2	2	4	−2	0.00
Romania	2	1	0	1	4	3	+1	50.00
Serbia	1	1	0	0	3	0	+3	100.00
Spain	2	0	0	2	0	6	−6	0.00
Switzerland	3	2	0	1	5	3	+2	66.67
Ukraine	1	1	0	0	3	0	+3	100.00

==== Non-UEFA competitions ====
Country	Pld	W	D	L	GF	GA	GD	Win%
England	9	6	2	1	19	7	+12	66.67
Italy	12	2	6	4	9	14	−5	16.67
Scotland	2	2	0	0	7	2	+5	100.00

== Goalscorers ==
Information correct as of 15 February 2016.

Ranking	Name	Years	UC	Total
1	(Australia) Mark Viduka	2004–2007	8	8
2	(Netherlands) Jimmy Floyd Hasselbaink	2004–2006	7	7
3	(Italy) Massimo Maccarone	2002–2007	5	5
4	(Netherlands) Boudewijn Zenden	2003–2005	3	3
4	(England) James Morrison	2004–2007	3	3
5	(England) Chris Riggott	2003–2010	2	2
5	(Cameroon) Joseph-Désiré Job	2000–2006	2	2
5	(Nigeria) Yakubu	2005–2007	2	2
6	(Netherlands) George Boateng	2002–2008	1	1
6	(England) Stewart Downing	2001–2009, 2015–2019	1	1
6	(England) Stuart Parnaby	2000–2007	1	1
6	(Slovakia) Szilárd Németh	2001–2006	1	1
