= Arioli =

Arioli is a surname. Notable people with the surname include:

- Giovanni Arioli (born 1976), Italian footballer
- Susie Arioli (born 1963), Canadian jazz singer

== See also ==
- Ariotti
