= 2012–13 US Ancona 1905 season =

U.S. Ancona 1905
2012–13 season
- Chairman: Gilberto Mancini
- Head Coach: Massimiliano Favo
- Stadium: Stadio del Conero, Ancona, Italy
- Serie D/F: 7th (after 34th round)
- Coppa Italia Serie D: 3rd round
- Top goalscorer: (Italy) Davide Borrelli (7)
| Home colours | Away colours |

== Players ==
Note: Flags indicate national team as defined under FIFA eligibility rules; some limited exceptions apply. Players may hold more than one non-FIFA nationality.

| No. | Pos. | Nation | Player |
|---|---|---|---|
| — | GK | (Italy) ITA | Luca Masserano (on loan from Junior Biellese) |
| — | GK | (Italy) ITA | Marco D'Arsiè |
| — | GK | (Italy) ITA | Aladin Ajoub |
| — | DF | (Italy) ITA | Nicolò Amoruso (on loan from Inter Milan) |
| — | DF | (Italy) ITA | Simone Eramo (on loan from Arezzo) |
| — | DF | (Italy) ITA | Federico Del Grosso (on loan from Giulianova) |
| — | DF | (Italy) ITA | Michele Mengarelli |
| — | DF | (Italy) ITA | Aurelio Barilaro (on loan from F.C. Guardavalle A.S.D.) |
| — | DF | (Italy) ITA | Luca Ciaramitaro |
| — | DF | (Italy) ITA | Andrea Gagliardini |
| — | DF | (Italy) ITA | Rinaldo Lispi (on loan from Viterbese) |
| — | DF | (Italy) ITA | Claudio Labriola (on loan from Avellino) |
| — | MF | (Italy) ITA | Cristian Alberto Bianchi (on loan from Sampdoria) |

| No. | Pos. | Nation | Player |
|---|---|---|---|
| — | MF | (Nigeria) NGA | Andrea Cossu |
| — | MF | (Italy) ITA | Andrea Bricca |
| — | MF | (Italy) ITA | Daniele Gramacci |
| — | MF | (Germany) GER | Francesco Streccioni |
| — | MF | (Italy) ITA | Davide Borrelli (on loan from Teramo) |
| — | MF | (Italy) ITA | Paolo Ruffini |
| — | MF | (Italy) ITA | Luca Bellucci (on loan from Teramo) |
| — | MF | (Italy) ITA | Luigi Artiaco (on loan from Isernia) |
| — | MF | (Italy) ITA | Giuseppe Ingari |
| — | FW | (Italy) ITA | Luca Sparvoli (on loan from Miglianico) |
| — | FW | (Italy) ITA | Paolo Martino (on loan from Carpi) |
| — | FW | (Italy) ITA | Luigi Palumbo (on loan from Isernia) |
| — | FW | (Italy) ITA | Giovanni Cavallaro |

== Staff ==
Head coach

- (Italy) Massimiliano Favo

Assistant coach

- (Italy) Marco Lelli

Goalkeeper coach

- (Italy) Maurizio Carbonari

== Matches ==
=== Serie D – Girone F ===
| 2 September 2012 1 | Maceratese | 0–2 | Ancona | Macerata |
| | | Report | Ruffini 19'; Borrelli 25' | Stadium: Stadio Helvia Recina; Referee: Daniele Alfare' (Mestre) |

| 8 September 2012 2 | Ancona | 1–1 | Jesina | Ancona |
| | Borrelli 33' | Report | Sebastianelli 70' | Stadium: Stadio del Conero; Referee: Massimo Alessandro Molinaroli (Verona) |

| 16 September 2012 3 | Ancona | 2–0 | Celano | Ancona |
| | Ambrosini 47'; Sparvoli 52' | Report | | Stadium: Stadio del Conero; Referee: Alessandro Pietropaolo(Modena) |

| 23 September 2012 4 | Vis Pesaro | 0–0 | Ancona | Pesaro |
| | | Report | | Stadium: Stadio Tonino Benelli; Referee: Rinaldi (Tivoli) |

| 30 September 2012 5 | Ancona | 4–3 | Termoli | Ancona |
| | Ruffini 27' (pen.), 44' (pen.), 64' (pen.); Olcese 38' | Report | Del Grosso 7' (o.g.); Bartolini 17'; Miani 91' | Stadium: Stadio del Conero; Referee: Luca Detta (Mantova) |

| 7 October 2012 6 | Civitanovese | 0–0 | Ancona | Civitanova Marche |
| | | Report | | Stadium: Stadio Polisportivo; Referee: Luca Bianchini (Cesena) |

| 14 October 2012 7 | Ancona | 5–0 | Fidene | Ancona |
| | Ambrosini 24' (pen.), 30'; Sparvoli 42'; Labriola 81'; Alvino 91' | Report | | Stadium: Stadio del Conero; Referee: Alex Panarese (Lecce) |

| 21 October 2012 8 | Marino | 1–1 | Ancona | Marino |
| | Olcese 81' (pen.) | Report | Pirro 89' | Stadium: Comunale Domenico Fiore; Referee: Massimiliano Pancaldo Trifirò (Barcellona Pozzo di Gotto) |

| 28 October 2012 9 | Ancona | 1–1 | Recanatese | Ancona |
| | Alvino 41' | Report | Iacoponi 52' (pen.) | Stadium: Stadio del Conero; Referee: Antonio Pirone (Ercolano) |

| 4 November 2012 10 | Sambenedettese | 2–2 | Ancona | Gualdo Tadino |
| | Napolano 12', 37' | Report | Ruffini 26'; Olcese 58' (pen.) | Stadium: Stadio Carlo Angelo Luzi; Referee: Giuseppe Scarica (Castellammare di Stabia) |

| 11 November 2012 11 | Ancona | 2–3 | Amiternina | Ancona |
| | Traini 37'; Lispi 53' | Report | Pedalino 14', 36'; Lenart 87' | Stadium: Stadio del Conero; Referee: Diego Provesi(Treviglio) |

| 18 November 2012 12 | Isernia | 1–2 | Ancona | Isernia |
| | Traini 11'; Martino 69' | Report | Palumbo 64' | Stadium: Stadio Mario Lancelotta; Referee: Carina Susana Vitulano (Livorno) |

| 25 November 2012 13 | Ancona | 1–0 | R.C. Angolana | Ancona |
| | Borrelli 62' | Report | | Stadium: Stadio del Conero; Referee: Massimiliano Ortuso (Ciampino) |

| 1 December 2012 14 | San Nicolò | 0–1 | Ancona | Teramo |
| | | Report | Gialloreto 59' (o.g.) | Stadium: Stadio di Teramo; Referee: Tommaso Diomaiuta (Albano Laziale) |

| 9 December 2012 15 | Ancona | 2–4 | San Cesareo | Ancona |
| | Ambrosini 11' (pen.); Gramacci 22' | Report | Tajarol 28', 63', 72', 77' | Stadium: Stadio del Conero; Referee: Gianni Bichisecchi (Livorno) |

| 16 December 2012 16 | Olympia Agnonese | 2–2 | Ancona | Agnone |
| | Ricamato 20'; Pifano 48' | Report | Borrelli 58'; Ruffini 63' | Stadium: Stadio Comunale Civitelle; Referee: Daniele Gozzi (Siena) |

| 22 December 2012 17 | Ancona | 2–1 | Astrea | Ancona |
| | Borrelli 16'; Artiaco 86' | Report | Mania 90+1' | Stadium: Stadio del Conero; Referee: Simone Serani (Monza) |

| 6 January 2013 18 | Ancona | 4–1 | Maceratese | Ancona |
| | Eramo 14'; Labriola 25'; Artiaco 39'; Bellucci 82' | Report | Orta 12' | Stadium: Stadio del Conero; Referee: Giuseppe Strippoli (Bari) |

| 13 January 2013 19 | Jesina | 2–1 | Ancona | Jesi |
| | Stefanelli 17'; Gabrielloni 68' | Report | Borrelli 48' | Stadium: Stadio Comunale Carotti; Referee: D'apice (Arezzo) |

| 27 January 2013 20 | Ancona | 1–0 | Vis Pesaro | Ancona |
| | Borrelli 18' | Report | | Stadium: Stadio del Conero; Referee: Antonio Giua(Pisa) |

| 30 January 2013 21 | Celano | 0–0 | Ancona | Celano |
| | | Report | | Stadium: Stadio Fabio Piccone; Referee: Fabio Fracassi (Campobasso) |

| 3 February 2013 22 | Termoli | 1–3 | Ancona | Termoli |
| | Spagna 15' | Report | Eramo 2'; Bricca 51'; Martino 61' | Stadium: Stadio Gino Cannarsa; Referee: Boggi (Salerno) |

| 17 February 2013 23 | Ancona | 1–2 | Civitanovese | Ancona |
| | Ruffini 29' | Report | Galli 26', 45+2' | Stadium: Stadio del Conero; Referee: Giampaolo Mantelli (Brescia) |

| 24 February 2013 24 | Fidene | 1–0 | Ancona | Rome |
| | Selva 37' | Report | | Stadium: Salaria Sport Village; Referee: Davide Oggioni (Monza) |

| 3 March 2013 25 | Ancona | 2–0 | Marino | Ancona |
| | Esposito 4' (o.g.); Cavallaro 27' | Report | | Stadium: Stadio del Conero; Referee: Andrea Zingrillo (Seregno) |

| 10 March 2013 26 | Recanatese | 2–0 | Ancona | Recanati |
| | Cavaliere 36'; A. Rossi 89' | Report | | Stadium: Stadio Nicola Tubaldi; Referee: Federico Dionisi (L'Aquila) |

| 17 March 2013 27 | Ancona | 1–1 | Sambenedettese | Ancona |
| | Cavallaro 18' (pen.) | Report | Ianni 36' | Stadium: Stadio del Conero; Referee: Luca Candeo (Este) |

| 24 March 2013 28 | Amiternina | 1–1 | Ancona | Scoppito |
| | Pedalino 78' | Report | Cavallaro 86' (pen.) | Stadium: Stadio Comunale; Referee: Giuseppe De Luca (Ercolano) |

| 28 March 2013 29 | Ancona | 1–1 | Isernia | Ancona |
| | Artiaco 31' | Report | Iaboni 34' (pen.) | Stadium: Stadio del Conero; Referee: Domenico Palermo (Bari) |

| 7 April 2013 30 | R.C. Angolana | 1–4 | Ancona | Città Sant'Angelo |
| | De Matteis 15' | Report | Artiaco 52', 65'; Cavallaro 62', 73' | Stadium: Stadio Comunale; Referee: Pierluigi Mazzei (Brindisi) |

| 14 April 2013 31 | Ancona | 1–0 | San Nicolò | Ancona |
| | Artiaco 42' | Report | | Stadium: Stadio del Conero; Referee: Giuseppe Perrotti (Campobasso) |

| 21 April 2013 32 | San Cesareo | 1–2 | Ancona | San Cesareo |
| | Cavallaro 60'; Artiaco 90+4' | Report | Mancini 60' (pen.) | Stadium: Stadio Comunale; Referee: Pierantonio Perotti (Legnano) |

| 28 April 2013 33 | Ancona | 3–4 | Olympia Agnonese | Ancona |
| | Palumbo 10'; Lispi 12'; Ingari 73' | Report | Ricamato 1'; Leonetti 11'; Pizzutelli 70'; Sivilla 79' | Stadium: Stadio del Conero; Referee: Massimo Alessandro Molinaroli (Verona) |

| 5 May 2013 34 | Astrea | 3–0 | Ancona | Rome |
| | Lispi 30' (o.g.); Sorrentino 43'; Giuntoli 67' | Report | | Stadium: Stadio Casal del Marmo; Referee: Manuel Giuliani (Teramo) |

=== Coppa Italia Serie D ===
| 26 August 2012 1st | Ancona | 0–0 (pen. 3-2) | Recanatese | Ancona |
| | | Report | | Stadium: Stadio del Conero; Referee: Gabriele Agostini (Bologna) |

| 26 September 2012 2nd | Ancona | 3–1 | Vis Pesaro | Ancona |
| | Ambrosini 22', 23'; Traini 39' | Report | Vicini 70' | Stadium: Stadio del Conero; Referee: Matteo Proietti (Terni) |

| 17 October 2012 3rd | Sambenedettese | 3–3 (pen. 4-3) | Ancona | San Benedetto del Tronto |
| | Napolano 50'; Pazzi 63' (pen.), 73' | Report | Borrelli 34'; Traini 47'; Ruffini 58' | Stadium: Stadio Riviera delle Palme; Referee: Alessio Chiavaroli (Pescara) |

== Championship statistics ==
=== Results by round ===
| Round | 1 | 2 | 3 | 4 | 5 | 6 | 7 | 8 | 9 | 10 | 11 | 12 | 13 | 14 | 15 | 16 | 17 | 18 | 19 | 20 | 21 | 22 | 23 | 24 | 25 | 26 | 27 | 28 | 29 | 30 | 31 | 32 | 33 | 34 |
|---|---|---|---|---|---|---|---|---|---|---|---|---|---|---|---|---|---|---|---|---|---|---|---|---|---|---|---|---|---|---|---|---|---|---|
| Ground | A | H | H | A | H | A | H | A | H | A | H | A | H | A | H | A | H | H | A | H | A | A | H | A | H | A | H | A | H | A | H | A | H | A |
| Result | W | D | W | D | W | D | W | D | D | D | L | W | W | W | L | D | W | W | L | W | D | W | L | L | W | L | D | D | D | W | W | W | L | L |

Updated to match(es) played on 5 May 2013. Source:
A = Away; H = Home; W = Win; D = Draw; L = Loss

=== Results summary ===
| Overall | | | | | | | | Home | | | | | | Away | | | | | |
| Pld | W | D | L | GF | GA | GD | Pts | W | D | L | GF | GA | GD | W | D | L | GF | GA | GD |
|---|---|---|---|---|---|---|---|---|---|---|---|---|---|---|---|---|---|---|---|
| 33 | 15 | 11 | 7 | 55 | 39 | +16 | 56 | 9 | 4 | 4 | 34 | 22 | +12 | 6 | 7 | 3 | 21 | 17 | +4 |

Last updated: May 2013.
