= 1993–94 Coppa Italia =

Tournament details
- Country: Italy
- Dates: 22 Aug 1993 – 20 Apr 1994
- Teams: 48

Final positions
- Champions: Sampdoria (4th title)
- Runners-up: Ancona

Tournament statistics
- Matches played: 78
- Goals scored: 180 (2.31 per match)
- Top goal scorer: Attilio Lombardo (5 goals)

The 1993–94 Coppa Italia, the 47th Coppa Italia was an Italian Football Federation domestic cup competition won by Sampdoria, who defeated Ancona Calcio in the final 6–1 on aggregate.

== First round ==
Home team	Result	Away team
Vicenza (2)	1–0	Modena (2)
Perugia (3)	2–1	Genoa (1)
SPAL (3)	1–2 (aet)	Cosenza (2)
Acireale (2)	0–1	Ascoli (2)
Giarre (3)	0–2 (aet)	Ancona (2)
Avellino (3)	1–0	Bari (2)
Fiorentina (2)	2–0	Empoli (3)
Monza (2)	1–2 (aet)	Venezia (2)
Palermo (2)	2–1	Hellas Verona (2)
Como (3)	1–2	Brescia (2)
Ravenna (2)	0–1	Cesena (2)
Triestina (3)	2–1 (aet)	Pescara (2)
Bologna (3)	1–2	Padova (2)
Fidelis Andria (2)	0–2	Pisa (2)
Salernitana (3)	1–2	Udinese (1)
Leffe (3)	2–3	Lucchese (2)

== Second round ==
Team 1	Agg.	Team 2	1st leg	2nd leg
Milan (1)	4–1	Vicenza (2)	3–0	1–1
Piacenza (1)	3–2	Perugia (3)	3–1	0–1
Cosenza (2)	2–6	Atalanta (1)	0–2	2–4
Ascoli (2)	1–3	Torino (1)	1–3	0–0
Napoli (1)	2–3	Ancona (2)	0–0	2–3
Lazio (1)	0–2	Avellino (3)	0–2	0–0
Fiorentina (2)	3–0	Reggiana (1)	3–0	0–0
Juventus (1)	4–5	Venezia (2)	1–1	3–4
Parma (1)	4–0	Palermo (2)	2–0	2–0
Brescia (2)	4–2	Cremonese (1)	2–2	2–0
Cagliari (1)	1–2	Cesena (2)	1–1	0–1
Foggia (1)	6–2	Triestina (3)	2–2	4–0
Padova (2)	1–2	Roma (1)	1–1	0–1
Sampdoria (1)	0–0 (p: 3–1)	Pisa (2)	0–0	0–0
Udinese (1)	4–3	Lecce (2)	2–0	2–3
Lucchese (2)	2–3	Internazionale (1)	2–0	0–2

p=after penalty shoot–out

== Round of 16 ==
Team 1	Agg.	Team 2	1st leg	2nd leg
Milan (1)	1–2	Piacenza (1)	1–1	0–1
Atalanta (1)	0–3	Torino (1)	0–3	0–0
Ancona (2)	3–2	Avellino (3)	1–0	2–2
Fiorentina (2)	1–2	Venezia (2)	1–2	0–0
Parma (1)	4–3	Brescia (2)	1–1	3–2
Cesena (2)	1–2	Foggia (1)	1–0	0–2 (aet)
Sampdoria (1)	3–3 (p: 7–6)	Roma (1)	2–1	1–2
Udinese (1)	1–2	Internazionale (1)	0–0	1–2

p=after penalty shoot–out

== Quarter–finals ==
Team 1	Agg.	Team 2	1st leg	2nd leg
Piacenza (1)	3–4	Torino (1)	2–2	1–2
Venezia (2)	0–2	Ancona (2)	0–0	0–2
Foggia (1)	1–9	Parma (1)	0–3	1–6
Sampdoria (1)	2–1	Internazionale (1)	1–0	1–1

== Semi–finals ==
Team 1	Agg.	Team 2	1st leg	2nd leg
Ancona (2)	1–0	Torino (1)	1–0	0–0
Sampdoria (1)	3–1	Parma (1)	2–1	0–0

== Final ==
=== First leg ===
6 April 1994
21:00

Ancona	0–0	Sampdoria

Stadio del Conero, Ancona
Attendance: 16,871
Referee: Alfredo Trentalange

=== Second leg ===
20 April 1994
21:00

Sampdoria	6–1	Ancona
Vecchiola 50' (o.g.); Lombardo 50' 75'; Vierchowod 65'; Bertarelli 80' (pen.); Evani 85' (pen.)		Lupo 72'

Stadio Luigi Ferraris, Genoa
Attendance: 39,000
Referee: Luciano Luci

Sampdoria won 6–1 on aggregate.

== Top goalscorers ==
Rank	Player	Club	Goals
1	(Italy) Attilio Lombardo	Sampdoria	5
2	(Sweden) Tomas Brolin	Parma	4
2	(Colombia) Faustino Asprilla	Parma	4
2	(Italy) Gianpietro Piovani	Piacenza	4
2	(Italy) Massimo Agostini	Anconitana	4
2	(Italy) Salvatore Campilongo	Venezia	4
7	(Italy) Gianfranco Zola	Parma	3
7	(Italy) Alessandro Melli	Parma	3
7	(Argentina) Gabriel Batistuta	Fiorentina	3
7	(Italy) Giovanni Stroppa	Foggia	3
7	(Italy) Sebastiano Vecchiola	Anconitana	3
7	(Italy) Raffaele Cerbone	Venezia	3
7	(Italy) Dario Hübner	Cesena	3
