= Gianluca De Angelis =

Gianluca De Angelis may refer to:

- Gianluca De Angelis (footballer born 1967) Italian footballer active 1985–2005, Serie B, C1, C2 players
- Gianluca De Angelis (footballer born 1981) Italian footballer active since 2000, Serie C1 and C2 players
