= Vincenzo Guerini =

Vincenzo Guerini is the name of

- Vincenzo Guerini (athlete) (born 1950), Italian sprinter
- Vincenzo Guerini (footballer) (born 1953), Italian football player and manager
