= Andrea Armellini =

Italian footballer (born 1970)

Personal information
- Date of birth: 2 July 1970 (age 56)
- Place of birth: Porto Sant'Elpidio
- Position: Goalkeeper

Senior career*
Years	Team	Apps	(Gls)
1989–1991	Civitanovese		
1991–1992	Fano		
1992–1993	Civitanovese		
1993–1994	Ancona		
1994–1995	Siena		
1996–1998	Benevento		
1998–1999	Cesena		
2000–2001	Modena		
2001–2003	Avellino		
2003–2004	Giulianova		
2004–2005	Juve Stabia		
2006–2007	Real Marcianise		
- * Club domestic league appearances and goals

Andrea Armellini (born 2 July 1970) is a retired Italian football goalkeeper.

In the first leg of the 1994 Coppa Italia Final, Armellini kept a clean sheet for Ancona.
