= History of Piacenza Calcio 1919 =

The history of Piacenza Foot-Ball Club S.p.A. (usually denominated as Piacenza Calcio) has covered 93 years of the football from the club based in Piacenza, Emilia-Romagna. It was an Italian association football club founded in 1919. In 2012 the club was declared bankrupt and the team was disbanded. A successor, Piacenza Calcio 1919, former known as Lupa Piacenza and A.C.D. LibertaSpes, had licensed to the brand of the club since 2012.

The club won the Anglo-Italian Cup in 1986. The highest they have ever finished in their home league is 12th in Serie A, which they have achieved twice in 1997/1998 and 2001/2002. They spent much of their history in the lower divisions, suffering relegation in four of their first six Serie B seasons. They first reaching Serie A in the early nineties, and have been relegated to Lega Pro Prima Divisione.

Piacenza has been known in the past for its strong reluctance to use foreign players, using a team made up exclusively of Italians for most of its Serie A seasons.

== From 1919 to 2012 ==
=== Foundation ===
From the late 19th century football had begun gain popularity in Piacenza and was introduced into the college system along with cycling, gymnastics, archery and other sports. The spark that helped ignite football in the city was a student tournament in 1908. The football competition was played out between teams from various cities, and the team from Collegio Morigi from Piacenza were the victors.

The early football played in the city was limited to "friendlies" until Piacenza Calcio was founded in 1919 with the first club president as Giovanni Dosi. Dosi was an ambitious manager, taking control of every social, technical and administrative aspect of the club, with the sole focus at bringing the club into the national championship under the FIGC. In their first season, the club played 12 games. Their opponents included; Parma, Reggiana, Spal, and prominent local side Bologna. The season was a great start for Piacenza, who only lost one game (1–0 to Bologna) gaining promotion to Prima Categoria. The first championship winning squad included the players Fontana, Armani, Meani, Sala I, Marelli, Paleari, Cella, Galimberti, Bossola, Giiumanini, Boselli, Ronchetti, Ventura, Sala II, Raina, Ziliani I, Ziliani II, Avogadri, Sala III and Antonini.

After spending much of the club's early life in the regional leagues, they entered into Serie C for the 1935–36 season, coming close to gaining promotion into Serie B during 1938 but lost out to Fanfulla.

=== Post-World War ===
After World War II, Piacenza competed in Serie B for the first time, competing there for two seasons before falling back down to Serie C in 1948. During 1952 for the second time the club was close to promotion but lost out again, this time to Cagliari.

The club were punished for illicit sportsmanship in 1956 and were relegated to Serie D. This proved to be quite a heavy blow for the club as they would continue to yo-yo between Serie C and D until 1964. Piacenza finally returned to Serie B in 1969, under coach Tino Molina and president Vincenzo Romagnoli.

=== 1970s and 1980s ===
Piacenza's history until recent times was mostly undistinguished, with brief spells in Serie B in the 1940s and further spells in 1969–70, 1975–76 and 1987–88 to 1988–89.

=== Between Serie A and Serie B ===
Promotion in 1991 saw a rise in the side's fortunes under coach Gigi Cagni with the club promoted to Serie A for the first time in 1993.

The 1993 side contained players such as midfielder Daniele Moretti, winger Francesco Turrini and forward Giampietro Piovani. They spent 1993–94 holding their own in mid-table and were on the fringes of a place in the UEFA Cup, but were unfortunate to be relegated on the final day. The club wisely chose to retain Cagni and most of his squad, and they would achieve promotion as Serie B champions in 1995.

The following five years saw the club win many supporters with its all-Italian lineup and successful battles against relegation. In 1997 the club acquired legendary hard man defender Pietro Vierchowod. Despite his advancing years, Vierchowod proved an outstanding purchase, more than holding his own in defence and even scoring decisive goals in the relegation battle. Relegation in 2000 was followed by an instant return to Serie A for two years with outstanding form shown by players like midfielder Enzo Maresca.

The club has since remained in Serie B without threatening to mount a promotion challenge. On the final day of the 2006–07 Serie B season, the team needed a victory to force a Serie B promotion playoff, but were held to a draw, and thus the top 3 gained automatic promotion.

The club profited in the player sale by selling Daniele Cacia (50% €4.5 million), Hugo Campagnaro in summer 2007, and again in summer 2008 from Houssine Kharja and re-selling Cacia (€0.2 million net)

=== 2010-11: Relegation to Prima Divisione ===
However following a poor 2010-11 Serie B season, Piacenza found themselves in a relegation playoff against Albinoleffe which they lost due to Albinoleffe's higher league position. The club also had to finance the club with financial trick, which Matteo Colombi and Andrea Lussardi were sold to Internazionale but in swap deal, the time gap between receiving (booking) profit and amortize transfer fee made 2009–10 accounts was boosted for €3 million and the bought back action made true amortization cost in 2010–11 season was unchanged, however in 2011–12 accounts the club had to book around €750,000 (€3M divided by 4-year contract )amortization cost on Colombi and Lussardi.

=== 2012: Final bankruptcy after relegation ===
On 22 March 2012 Piacenza Calcio in strong financial difficulty was declared bankrupt by the court of Piacenza. In this season it was ranked 15th and relegated from Lega Pro Prima Divisione to Lega Pro Seconda Divisione after play-out. On 19 June 2012 the club was finally declared bankrupt and the team was disbanded.

=== Colors and badge ===
The team's colors were red and white, prompting one of the team's nicknames, the Biancorossi. They are also known as the Papaveri (Poppies), and the Lupi (Wolves).

=== Stadium ===
It played at the Stadio Leonardo Garilli, in Piacenza, which has a capacity of 21,668.

=== Notable former managers ===
See Category:Piacenza Calcio 1919 managers.

=== Honours ===
Anglo-Italian Cup

- Winners: 1986

Serie B

- Champions: 1994/95
- Runners-up: 2000/01
- Promoted: 1992/93

Serie C

- Champions: 1986/87, 1990/91
- Runners-up: 1936/37, 1937/38 (*)

Seconda Divisione

- Promoted: 1927/28
- Group runners-up: 1922/23, 1924/25

Emilian Championship:

- Champions: 1919/20

(*) Finished equal first position but lost play-off game to A.C. Fanfulla 1874

== The football in Piacenza now ==
=== Piacenza Calcio 1919 ===
In summer 2012 the brand of the failed Piacenza was given for four years by the association Salva Piace to Lupa Piacenza, formerly LibertaSpes. Its project was preferred to that of the other team of the same city, Atletico BP Pro Piacenza.

In the summer of 2013 it was renamed Piacenza Calcio 1919.
