= Salvatore Mazzarano =

Italian footballer (1965–2024)

Personal information
- Date of birth: 4 July 1965
- Place of birth: Massafra, Taranto, Italy
- Date of death: 11 January 2024 (aged 58)
- Place of death: Massafra, Taranto, Italy
- Height: 1.83 m (6 ft 0 in)
- Position: Centre-back

Senior career*
Years	Team	Apps	(Gls)
1984–1986	Massafra		
1986–1990	Fasano		
1990–1901	Casarano		
1991–1994	Ancona		
1994–1995	Taranto		
1995–1996	Castrovillari		
- * Club domestic league appearances and goals

Salvatore Mazzarano (4 July 1965 – 11 January 2024) was an Italian professional footballer who played as a centre-back. He most notably played for Ancona, winning promotion from the 1991–92 Serie B, contesting the 1992–93 Serie A and the 1994 Coppa Italia final which Ancona lost.
