= Andrea Bruniera =

Italian footballer (born 1964)

Personal information
- Date of birth: 10 February 1964 (age 62)
- Place of birth: Treviso, Italy
- Position: Midfielder

Senior career*
Years	Team	Apps	(Gls)
1981–1982	Montebelluna		
1982–1984	Atalanta		
1984–1987	Civitanovese		
1987–1989	Ancona		
1989–1990	Udinese		
1990–1994	Ancona		
1995	Fano		
1995–1996	S.P.A.L.		
1996–1997	Trapani		
1997–1999	Fermana		

Managerial career
- 2001–2003: Real Vallesina
- 2003–2004: Fermana
- 2004: Gualdo
- 2005–2006: Chiaravalle
- 2018–2019: Virtus Bergamo
- 2023: Fermana
- * Club domestic league appearances and goals

Andrea Bruniera (born 10 February 1964) is an Italian football coach and retired player.

== Playing career ==
A midfielder, he started his career in 1981 with Serie C2 Montebelluna. In 1987, he joined Ancona, with whom he played for seven seasons, apart from a single one on loan to Serie A club Udinese; at Ancona, he was one of the protagonists of the club's rise to Serie A. He successively played for several minor teams before retiring in January 1999 after a season and a half spent with Fermana.

== Coaching career ==
In 2001, Bruniera took on his first coaching role as head coach of Promozione amateurs Real Vallesina, with whom he won promotion to Eccellenza. In 2003, he returned to Fermana as a head coach, guiding them to safety in the Serie C1 league. In 2004, Bruniera had a brief experience in charge of Serie C2 club Gualdo.

In 2006, after a brief experience in charge of Eccellenza amateurs Chiaravalle, Bruniera moved to Verona as a youth coach and successively as an assistant coach at AlbinoLeffe, first to Elio Gustinetti and then Armando Madonna. He successively followed Madonna on his next coaching endeavours at Piacenza, Livorno and Portogruaro.

After more assistant coaching experiences at Virtus Lanciano and Pescara (alongside Marco Baroni) and Virtus Bergamo (back with Armando Madonna), he was promoted head coach of the latter club in 2018.

In 2019, Bruniera returned to Fermana, first as a youth coach and then as an assistant. In January 2022, he joined SPAL as an assistant to Roberto Venturato.

In July 2023, he returned to Fermana as a head coach of the Serie C club. His Fermana comeback was however short-lived, as he was dismissed on 11 October 2023 due to negative results.
