= Edoardo Artistico =

Italian footballer (born 1969)

Personal information
- Date of birth: 16 June 1969 (age 57)
- Place of birth: Rome, Italy
- Height: 1.80 m (5 ft 11 in)
- Position: Forward

Youth career
- Maestrelli
- Lazio

Senior career*
Years	Team	Apps	(Gls)
1986–1987	Cynthia	10	(4)
1987–1992	Vicenza	68	(21)
1987–1988	→ Roma (loan)	0	(0)
1988–1989	→ Frosinone (loan)	30	(9)
1989–1990	→ Perugia (loan)	33	(6)
1992–1994	Monza	67	(12)
1994	Pescara	9	(2)
1994–1996	Ancona	56	(26)
1996	Perugia	3	(1)
1996–1998	Salernitana	53	(18)
1998–2001	Torino	47	(16)
2001–2003	Crotone	41	(21)
2003	→ Napoli (loan)	4	(1)
2003–2005	Pistoiese	42	(17)
2005	Verona	9	(1)
2005–2006	Latina	6	(0)

International career
1990	Umbria	1	(1)
- * Club domestic league appearances and goals

Edoardo Artistico (born 16 June 1969), is an Italian former professional footballer who played as a forward.

== Club career ==
Born in Trastevere, Rome, Artistico passed through the youth categories of Mastrelli di Portonaccio and Lazio. As a professional he first played in 1986 for Cynthia. The following year he was acquired by L.R. Vicenza, where he was loaned to Roma, Frosinone and Perugia in the following seasons.

In 1992, Artistico played for the first time in Serie B for Monza. He remained playing for second-level clubs in the following seasons, for Pescara and Ancona. In 1996, he had another spell at Perugia (in Serie A), where he made three appearances and scored one goal. In 1996 he arrived at U.S. Salernitana, and in the following season Artistico was part of the Serie B champion squad in 1997–98, a feat he would repeat in 2000–01 with Torino F.C.

He also played for Crotone, with short loan spells at Napoli, Pistoiese and Hellas Verona. His career ended in 2006, he ended, after playing in only six matches with Serie C2 club Latina.

== International career ==
On 28 May 1990, Artistico played for Umbria (a selection of players from Perugia, Ternana and Gubbio) in a friendly match against the Brazil national team, in preparation for the 1990 FIFA World Cup. The match was won by the Umbria team, with Artistico scoring the winning goal from a free kick.

== Style of play ==
A centre forward with physical strength, Artistico stood out mainly for his headers.

== Personal life ==
Edoardo Artistico is the brother of footballer Mario Artistico.

== Honours ==
Salernitana

- Serie B: 1997–98

Torino

- Serie B: 2000–01
