= Emiliano Olcese =

Argentinian footballer (born 1983)

Personal information
- Full name: Emiliano Olcese
- Date of birth: 14 May 1983 (age 43)
- Place of birth: Buenos Aires, Argentina
- Position: Forward

Team information
- Current team: SP La Fiorita
- Number: 9

Senior career*
Years	Team	Apps	(Gls)
-2003	Argentinos Juniors		
2003	Livingston	0	(0)
2004–2005	Matera		
2005–2007	Club Atlético Sarmiento		
2007	Gelbison Cilento Vallo della Lucania		
2007–2010	Casertana		
2010–2011	Rimini		
2011–2012	ASD Polisportiva Sarnese Calcio	26	(15)
2012	AC Ancona	12	(3)
2012–2013	SSD Città di Teramo	18	(1)
2013–2014	ASD Battipagliese	27	(15)
2014–2015	Fidelis Andria 2018	29	(13)
2015–2017	San Marino Calcio	64	(33)
2017	SP La Fiorita	0	(0)
2017–2018	Vis Pesaro dal 1898	33	(21)
2018	SP La Fiorita	0	(0)
2018–2019	Vis Pesaro dal 1898	34	(5)
2019	SSD Casarano Calcio	15	(2)
2019–2020	Taranto FC 1927	10	(0)
2020–2021	AS Pineto Calcio	12	(1)
2021	SSD San Nicolò Notaresco	19	(3)
2021–2023	AC Libertas	59	(28)
2023-	SP La Fiorita	77	(36)
- * Club domestic league appearances and goals as of 25 June 2026

Emiliano Olcese (born 14 May 1983) is an Argentinian professional footballer who played as a forward for SP La Fiorita.

== Club career ==
Olcese started his career at Argentinos Juniors.

In 2003, Olcese signed for Scottish side Livingston. He left the club after less than one season without making a single first team appearance.

Since leaving Livi, the journeyman striker has played for various clubs in Argentina, Italy and San Marino.
