= Sebastiano Vecchiola =

Italian footballer

Personal information
- Date of birth: 23 May 1970 (age 56)
- Place of birth: San Benedetto del Tronto
- Height: 1.81 m (5 ft 11 in)
- Position: Midfielder

Senior career*
Years	Team	Apps	(Gls)
1988–1990	Sambenedettese		
1990–1994	Ancona		
1994–1995	Atalanta		
1995–1996	Venezia		
1996	Pescara		
1997	Reggiana		
1998	Ravenna		
1998	Genoa		
1999	Napoli		
1999–2001	Ravenna		
2001–2003	Mestre		
2003–2004	Maceratese		
2004–2005	Ancona		
- * Club domestic league appearances and goals

Sebastiano Vecchiola (born 23 May 1970) is a retired Italian football midfielder.
