= Miloš Glonek =

Slovak footballer (born 1968)

Personal information
- Date of birth: 26 September 1968 (age 58)
- Place of birth: Zlaté Moravce, Czechoslovakia
- Height: 1.84 m (6 ft 0 in)
- Position: Defender

Youth career
- 1982–1984: Zlaté Moravce
- 1984–1986: Spartak Trnava

Senior career*
Years	Team	Apps	(Gls)
1986–1992	Slovan Bratislava	92	(4)
1992–1994	Ancona	54	(0)
1994–1997	Caen	46	(1)
1997–1998	Slovan Bratislava	25	(0)
1998–2001	Caen	94	(0)

International career
1991–1993	Czechoslovakia	13	(0)
1994–1996	Slovakia	12	(0)

Managerial career
- 2009: Slovakia U21
- * Club domestic league appearances and goals

Miloš Glonek (born 26 September 1968) is a former professional footballer who played as a defender. He played for Czechoslovakia and Slovakia at international level, earning 13 and 12 caps respectively. Upon ending his playing career, Glonek became a lawyer.
