= Vincenzo Guerini (footballer) =

Italian footballer and manager

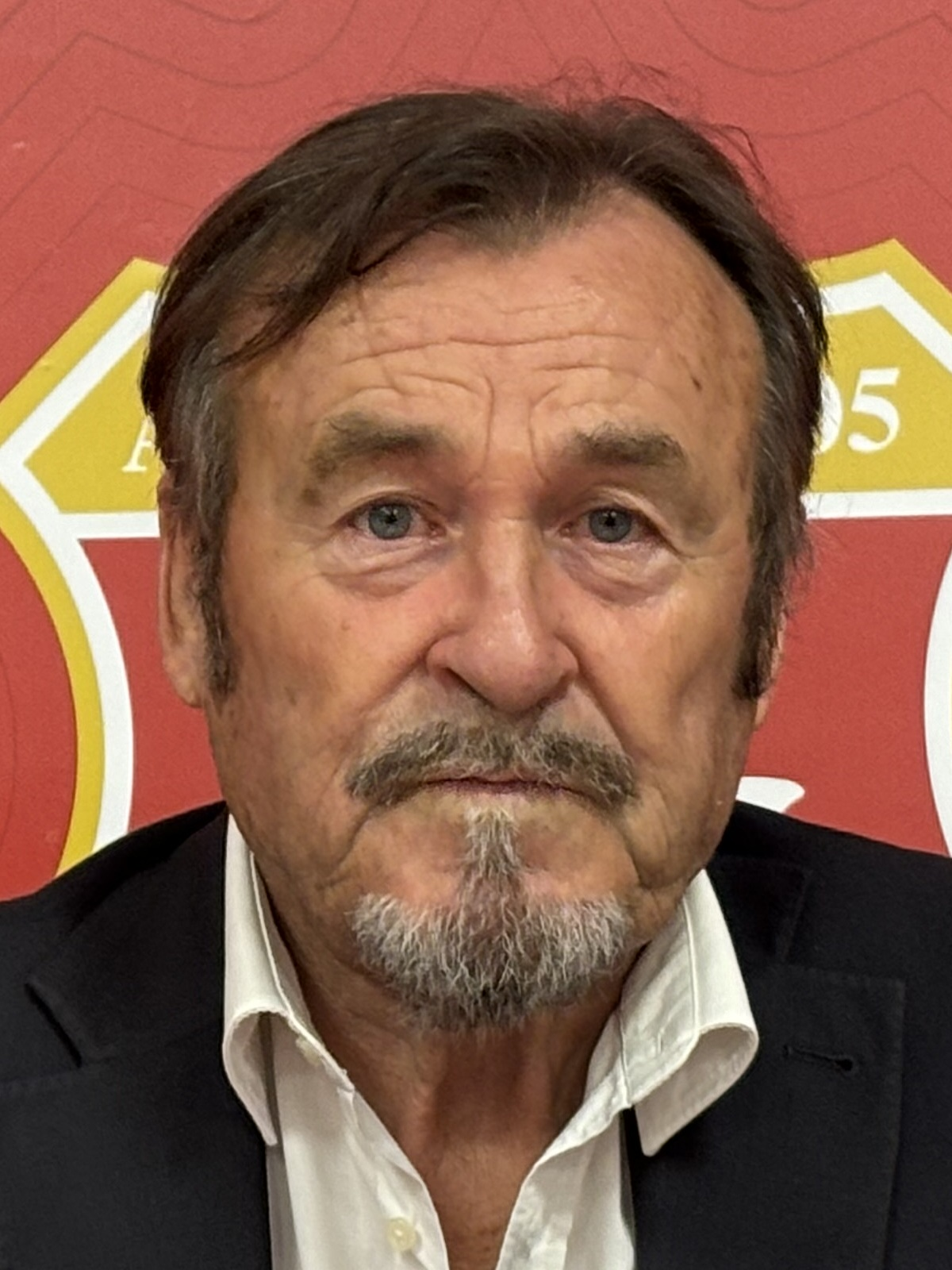
- Guerini in 2024

Personal information
- Date of birth: 30 October 1953 (age 72)
- Place of birth: Sarezzo, Italy
- Position: Attacking midfielder

Team information
- Current team: Catania (technical area chief)

Youth career
- Coffea Virle
- 1970–1971: Brescia

Senior career*
Years	Team	Apps	(Gls)
1971–1973	Brescia	34	(6)
1973–1976	Fiorentina	53	(1)

International career
1974	Italy	1	(0)

Managerial career
- 1983–1985: Fiorentina
- 1985–1986: Pisa
- 1986–1987: Bologna
- 1987–1988: Catanzaro
- 1988–1989: Brescia
- 1989–1994: Ancona
- 1994: Napoli
- 1994–1996: SPAL
- 1996–1997: Reggina
- 1997–1998: Piacenza
- 1998–2000: Ternana
- 2000: Catania
- 2001–2002: Siena
- 2002–2003: Panachaiki
- 2003: Catania
- 2005–2006: Catanzaro
- 2012: Fiorentina (caretaker)
- * Club domestic league appearances and goals

Vincenzo Guerini (Italian pronunciation: [vinˈtʃɛntso ɡweˈriːni]; born 30 October 1953) is an Italian football manager and former player who played as a midfielder, currently in charge as the technical area chief of Catania.

== Playing career ==
=== Club ===
Guerini's playing career started at Brescia, playing as a regular in the Serie B division. In 1973, he was signed by Serie A club Fiorentina, where he emerged as a young but promising attacking midfielder and won the 1975 Coppa Italia thanks to a goal of his in the final against Milan. His career was however cut short in 1976 after suffering a severe car accident that almost left him impaired.

=== International ===
Despite his short playing career, Guerini also had the chance to play as a full international in 1974, when he was lined up by the coaching duo Fulvio Bernardini-Enzo Bearzot for a game against Bulgaria.

== Managerial career ==
=== Early years ===
Despite being only aged 22, Guerini immediately entered into a non-playing career and became youth coach at his last club Fiorentina, also winning a Campionato Nazionale Primavera title in 1983. On that same year, Serie B club Empoli offered him their head coaching position, the first in Guerini's career. In 1985, he was then hired by another Tuscan club, Pisa, thus having the chance to make his coaching debut in the Serie A league; despite winning a Mitropa Cup on that same year, Guerini however failed to save the team from relegation. His following experience, at Serie B's Bologna, then ended with a dismissal before the end of the season. He then served as head coach of Catanzaro, narrowly missing a top flight promotion, and successively Brescia.

=== Ancona and later career ===
In 1989 Guerini was appointed head coach of another Serie B club, Ancona. In what proved to be his most successful stint as a manager, Guerini led Ancona to a historical first promotion ever in the Serie A league (a stint that lasted only one season), then ending as 1993–94 Coppa Italia runners-up in his final season at the club. He was then hired by Napoli, but dismissed after only eight games (including a UEFA Cup elimination at the hands of Boavista).

After that, Guerini had two short-lived coaching experiences in the minor leagues that turned out not to be particularly successful (SPAL, Reggina) until 1997, when he was hired by Piacenza and saved the then-Serie A club from relegation in what is his most successful placement in the top flight to date. Guerini then had a handful of unsuccessful experiences, all them as a replacement coach or with him not completing the season (Ternana, Catania, Siena, Greek side Panachaiki, Catania again, and a second stint at Catanzaro).

In 2011, he was hired by former club Fiorentina as "club manager". On 2 May 2012, he was then appointed caretaker coach after the club decided to remove Delio Rossi from his managerial duties following a physical confrontation with the Serbian player Adem Ljajić during the home league game against the Novara. In his first game in charge, he led Fiorentina to a 1–0 win at Lecce that mathematically guaranteed the club a place in the 2012–13 Serie A. He successively moved back to his previous role as club manager, which he held until 2016.

In August 2020 he was named new technical area chief of Catania, following a club takeover.

== Honours ==
=== As player ===
Fiorentina

- Coppa Italia: 1974–75

=== As coach ===
Fiorentina

- Campionato Nazionale Primavera: 1983
- Torneo di Viareggio: 1982

Pisa

- Mitropa Cup: 1986
