= Ariotti =

Ariotti is an Italian surname. Notable people with this surname include:

- Alison Ariotti (née Fletcher, born 1980), Australian journalist and news presenter
- Eliseo Antonio Ariotti (born 1948), Italian diplomatic of the Holy See and former Apostolic Nuncio to Paraguay
- Philippe Ariotti (born 1941), French actor and musician
