= US Ancona 1905 =

Defunct Italian football club

Ancona
- Full name: Unione Sportiva Ancona 1905 S.r.l.
- Nicknames: I Dorici (The Dorians); I Biancorossi (The Red and Whites)
- Founded: 1948; 78 years ago 2010; 16 years ago (refounded)
- Dissolved: 2017; 9 years ago
- Ground: Stadio del Conero, Ancona, Italy
- Capacity: 23,967
- 2016–17: Serie C/B, 20th (relegated)
- Website: www.ancona1905.it
Home colours	Away colours

Unione Sportiva Ancona 1905, commonly referred to as Ancona, was an Italian football club based in Ancona, Marche.

The club changed its name to U.S. Ancona 1905 from S.S. Piano San Lazzaro in 2010, due to the bankruptcy of the main football team of the city, A.C. Ancona. However, after a relegation in 2017, U.S. Ancona 1905 withdrew from the football pyramid.

== History ==
The club was founded in 1948 as Società Sportiva Piano San Lazzaro and after its 2nd place in 2009–10 Eccellenza Marche it was renamed in 2010, after another failure of the main football club of the city, A.C. Ancona, changing its denomination to Unione Sportiva Ancona 1905, maintaining the same league.
US Ancona 1905 then became the new Ancona and the main football club of the city, but it is not its legitimate heir, having not yet acquired its brand and its sports title.

=== 2010–11 season ===
The club in the season 2010–11 obtains a prestigious "triplete":

- winning the 2010–11 Coppa Italia Dilettanti, obtaining so too the direct promotion to 2011–12 Serie D, beating in the final 3–1 the team of Eccellenza Lazio group B, Marino,
- after having previously won the "Regional Coppa Italia Marche" and
- winning also the league of Eccellenza Marche allowing the promotion of the aforementioned Latium team Marino, finalist of 2010–11 Coppa Italia Dilettanti.

=== 2011–12 season ===
The club in the season 2011–12 plays in Serie D group F with the objective of obtaining an immediate promotion to Lega Pro Seconda Divisione. On 29 November 2011, after the incredible remount suffered with Riccione who drew 2–2 to sawing 2 goals in the final minutes the coach Massimiliano Favo was sacked and substituted by Marco Osio, until 3 February 2012 when he rescinds the contract by mutual agreement with the company. The new coach of the team becomes Sauro Trillini. The team was ranked 3rd qualifying so for the Promotion playoffs, but it was eliminated from Sambenedettese in the second round.

=== 2012–13 season ===
In the 2012-13 season, the club played to the third round of the 2012–13 Coppa Italia Serie D where they lost to S.S. Sambenedettese Calcio on penalties 4-3 after drawing the game at 3-3. In the Serie D group F, the club was placed seven in the group.

=== Promoted to professionalism and disestablishment ===
In the 2013–14 season, Ancona won the Serie D title and thus ensured promotion to the 2014–15 Lega Pro, and back into professionalism. However, after finished as the 20th of the Group B of 2016–17 Lega Pro season, the club did not join the 2017–18 Serie D.

== Legacy ==
Phoenix club of the city, "U.S. Anconitana A.S.D." was formed in Prima Categoria in 2017.

Another phoenix club, but for Piano San Lazzaro, as of 2017–18 season played in Terza Categoria. It was refounded in 2016.

== Colors and badge ==
The team's color are white and red-yellow.

== Stadium ==
Ancona 1905 play their home matches at the 25,000 capacity, Stadio del Conero, located in the city of Ancona.

== Honours ==
- Eccellenza Marche:
  - Winner (1): 2010–11
- Coppa Italia Dilettanti:
  - Champion (1): 2010–11
