= Stadio Leonardo Garilli =

Multi-use stadium in Piacenza, Italy

Coordinates: 45°1′47″N 9°41′23″E

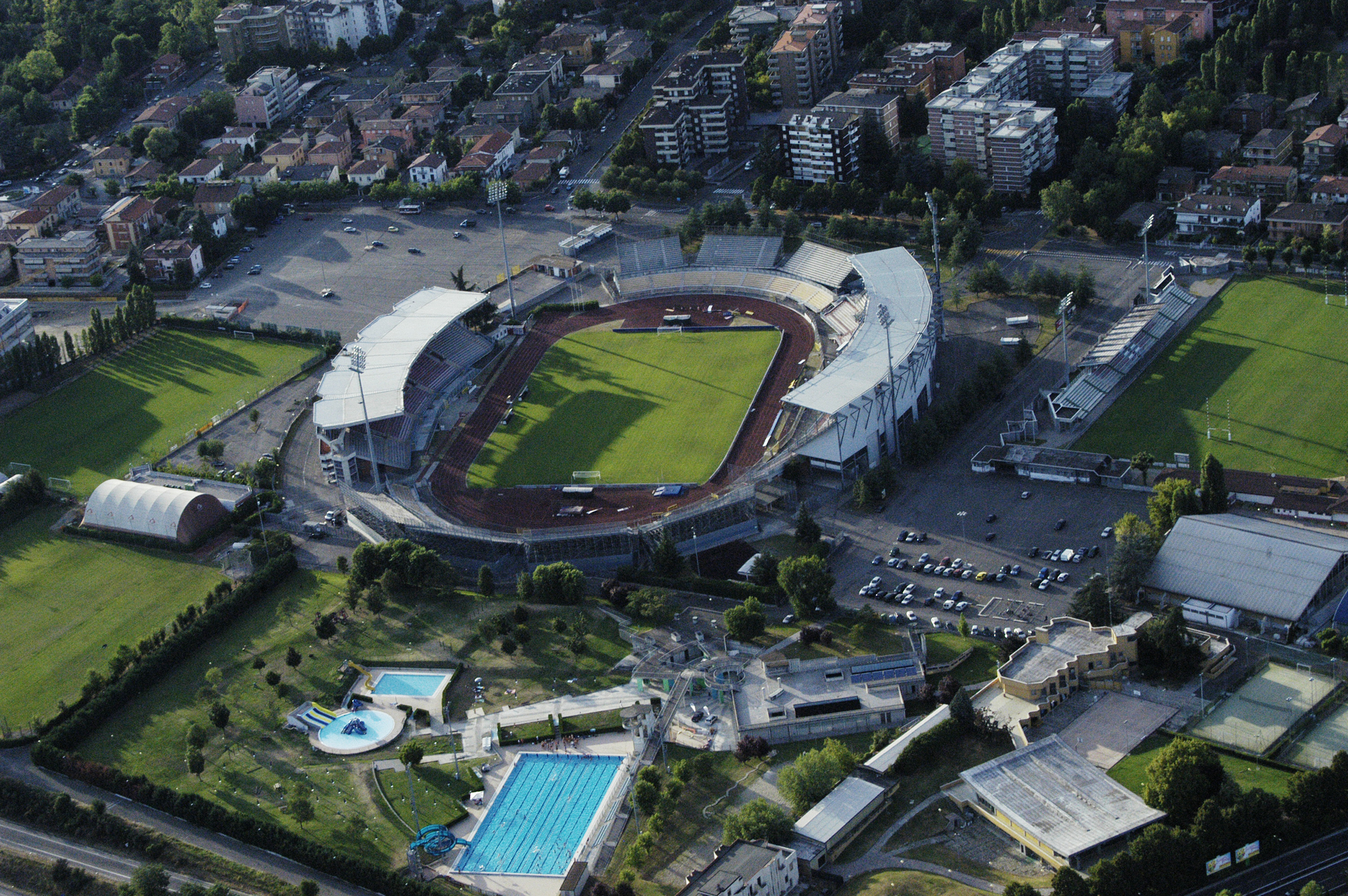
- Interactive map of Stadio Leonardo Garilli
- Former names: Stadio Galleana (1969–97)
- Location: Via Egidio Gorra, 25; 29122 Piacenza (PC), Italy
- Owner: Municipality of Piacenza
- Capacity: 21,668
- Surface: Grass; 105x65m

Construction
- Groundbreaking: 1969
- Opened: 1969
- Renovated: 1993

Tenants
- Piacenza; Pro Piacenza

The Stadio Leonardo Garilli is a multi-use stadium in Piacenza, Italy. It is currently used mostly for football matches and the home of Piacenza Calcio 1919 and from 2014 also those of Pro Piacenza 1919. The stadium was built in 1969 and was renovated in 1993 passing from 12,000 to the current 21,668 when the former Piacenza were promoted.

The Stadium used to be called 'Galleana' after the area of the city in which it is situated but currently named after Leonardo Garilli (died on 30 December 1996), to whom the city and fans are highly grateful because of his dedication and competence showed when he was the president of the former Piacenza.
