= Gianluca De Angelis (footballer, born 1967) =

Italian footballer and coach

Personal information
- Date of birth: 7 September 1967 (age 59)
- Place of birth: Pedaso, Italy
- Height: 1.80 m (5 ft 11 in)
- Position: Midfielder

Senior career*
Years	Team	Apps	(Gls)
1985–1987	Comunanza		
1987–1989	Civitanovese	64	(7)
1989–1995	Ancona	128	(11)
1992–1993	→ Barletta (loan)	21	(3)
1995–1996	Verona	25	(1)
1996–1997	Foggia	30	(2)
1997–1998	Ischia	28	(2)
1998–1999	Alzano Virescit	27	(3)
1999–2000	Modena	7	(0)
2000–2001	Vis Pesaro	39	(3)
2001–2003	Teramo	49	(11)
2003–2005	Frosinone	47	(2)
Total		465	(45)

Managerial career
- 2009–2011: Frosinone (youth)
- 2012–2013: Fermana
- 2014–: Fano
- * Club domestic league appearances and goals

Gianluca De Angelis (born 7 September 1967) is a former Italian footballer and currently head coach of Fano.

De Angelis had played 183 games in Italian Serie B; 155 games in Serie C1 and 127 games in Serie C2.

== Playing career ==
Born in Pedaso, in the Province of Fermo, Marche, De Angelis started his career at an amateur club in Comunanza, in the Province of Ascoli Piceno, Marche. He was signed by Serie C2 club Civitanovese in 1987, located in Province of Macerata, Marche. In 1989, he was signed by Ancona Calcio, located in Ancona, the capital of Marche region. He made his Serie B debut for the club. The club finished as the third of 1991–92 Serie B, thus promoted to Serie A. In November 1992 De Angelis was loaned to Barletta of Serie C1, after no appearances in 1992–93 Serie A. Ancona relegated back to Serie B in 1993, which De Angelis continued to play for the Marche club until 1995.

In October 1995 De Angelis was signed by Serie B club Hellas Verona F.C. The club promoted as the runner-up of 1995–96 Serie B. De Angelis left a Serie A club in September 1996 for second division club Foggia.

At age 30 he returned to the third division for Ischia. In 1998, he was signed by Alzano Virescit. The club won Group A of 1998–99 Serie C1. However, he left the club again after no appearance in 1999–2000 Serie B. He was signed by Serie C1 club Modena F.C. in October 1999. in March 2000 he moved, this time back to the fourth division for Vis Pesaro (from 1978 to 2014 Serie C2 was the fourth division). The Marche club won the promotion playoffs of 1999–2000 Serie C2. He spent a season with the club in Serie C1 before left again in September 2001. With Teramo, his 11th club of his career, he won promotion again as Group B champions of 2001–02 Serie C2. In 2003 the club avoided relegation, however De Angelis also left the club again. In 2003, he was signed by another fourth division club Frosinone, and again won promotion as Group C champions of 2003–04 Serie C2. He retired in 2005 after playing his last Serie C1 season.

== Coaching career ==
From 2009 to 2011 De Angelis was the coach of "Primavera" team (the reserve team) of Frosinone. He acquired license as youth team coach in 2005; in the next year he obtained UEFA A Licence, made him eligible to coach Serie C1 clubs or below or as vice-coach in Serie A and B.

De Angelis had coached amateur club Fermana to win Coppa Italia Dilettanti, thus winning the promotion to Serie D. However the Marche club also bankrupted at the end of season. (Montegranaro moved to Fermo to continues the football history of the town in 2013.) In February 2014 De Angelis was appointed as the head coach of Serie D club Fano.

== Honours ==
As players

- Serie C1: 1999 (Alzano Virescit)
- Serie C2: 2002 (Teramo), 2004 (Frosinone)

As coach

- Coppa Italia Dilettanti: 2013 (Fermana)
