= Orazio Russo =

Italian footballer (1973–2026)

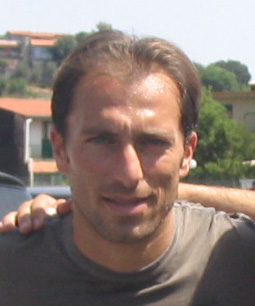

Personal information
- Date of birth: 6 October 1973
- Place of birth: Misterbianco, Sicily, Italy
- Date of death: 14 February 2026 (aged 52)
- Place of death: Catania, Sicily, Italy
- Height: 1.78 m (5 ft 10 in)
- Position: Forward

Youth career
- 1986–1990: S.S. Battiati
- 1990–1992: Catania

Senior career*
Years	Team	Apps	(Gls)
1991–1993	Catania	30	(2)
1993–1996	Lecce	79	(10)
1996–1997	Catania	30	(3)
1997–1998	SPAL	23	(1)
1998–1999	Savoia	26	(4)
1999–2004	Acireale	158	(30)
2004–2006	Catania	58	(7)
2006–2008	Padova	49	(4)
2008	Perugia	4	(0)
2009–2010	Gela	12	(1)
2010	Catania	1	(0)

Managerial career
- 2010–2015: Catania (assistant)
- 2017: Catania (assistant)
- 2017–: Catania (youth)
- 2019: Catania (caretaker)
- * Club domestic league appearances and goals

Orazio Russo (6 October 1973 – 14 February 2026) was an Italian professional football player and coach. He spent most of his career playing for Sicilian club Catania.

== Club career ==
=== Early career ===
Russo was born in Misterbianco, near Catania, where he grew up. His first team was S.S. Battiati, which plays in Sant'Agata li Battiati. His trainer, Enzo Fazio, trusted him, and when he was 15 years old, he became the leader of the senior team. At the age of 18, he was bought by Calcio Catania. He played in the youth team until 1992, when then-coach Giuseppe Caramanno called him up to the Serie C1 team.

=== Catania ===
After his move to Calcio Catania, he played five matches during his first Serie C1 season. In the 1992–93 season, he played 25 matches, scoring 2 goals.

=== Lecce ===
In July 1993, Russo was sold by Calcio Catania to U.S. Lecce. He played his first match in Serie A against A.C. Milan: 1–0, on 29 August 1993. Nedo Sonetti, his coach, chose him for the starting lineup, and Russo did not disappoint his coach; however, by the end of the season, Lecce was relegated. During the following summer, Orazio Russo made a tournée in the United States with Inter Milan, playing just friendlies. He came back to Lecce after this short experience. Lecce was relegated again in 1995, but in 1996 they won Serie C1. During his three-season stay at US Lecce, Russo managed 79 appearances, scoring 3 goals.

=== Return to Catania ===
In 1996, Russo returned to Calcio Catania, in Serie C2. However, the season ended with the team losing in the promotion play-off against F.C. Turris. This loss caused the team to remain in the Italian fourth tier for one more season. During his second spell with Catania, Russo appeared in 30 official league matches, scoring 3 goals.

=== SPAL - FC Savoia ===
Orazio Russo then joined SPAL in 1997, and in his lone season with the club, he scored just 1 goal in 23 matches. In 1998, he moved to Football Club Savoia 1908. He would go on to score 4 goals in 26 official league matches for the club in his single season. He won two championships; however, his trainers did not choose him for the starting lineup.

=== Acireale ===
In 1999, Russo moved back to Sicily with S.S.D. Acireale Calcio 1946. He became a key player for the Serie C club, in which he would remain a starter during the majority of his stay. Russo would remain at the club for 5 total seasons, the longest stay at a single club in his career. He appeared for the club in nearly 200 total matches in all competitions, scoring 38 goals (30 of which were in the league). His president, Antonino Pulvirenti, became his close friend, and both worked to bring this team to Serie B after they started from Serie C2 in 1999. In 2000, they lost the promotion play-off against L'Aquila Calcio. In 2001 and 2002, the team risked relegation; however, in 2003, Acireale won the championship. The following season, Acireale was relegated from Serie B after losing the relegation play-off against Viterbese.

=== Third spell with Catania ===
In 2004, Pulvirenti bought Calcio Catania, in a plan to bring the Serie C1 club to Serie A. In summer 2004, Orazio Russo, along with several other players of S.S.D. Acireale Calcio 1946 were purchased by Calcio Catania. The first year in Serie B was difficult for the team, which was trained by Maurizio Costantini and eventually replaced by Nedo Sonetti, yet Russo had a fairly strong season. After finishing runner-up in the 2005–06 Serie B season, Calcio Catania was promoted to the Serie A in May 2006. In his third spell with the Eastern Sicilian giants, Russo managed 58 appearances with 4 goals, two of which helped his team win promotion; however, he left Catania in August 2006 to play for Calcio Padova.

=== Padova ===
Russo joined Serie C1 side Calcio Padova in August 2006. He would remain with the club for two seasons, making 49 appearances and scoring 4 goals. The club was neither promoted nor relegated during his time with the team.

=== Perugia ===
On 27 August 2008, Russo transferred to fellow Serie C1 side (now known as the Lega Pro Prima Divisione). He would only make 4 appearances in his first four months with the club, scoring no goals, and hence, Russo terminated his contract mutually on 26 November 2008.

=== Gela ===
After his mutual contract rescission with Perugia Calcio, Russo signed for Lega Pro Seconda Divisione club Gela Calcio, where he would play from January 2009 until February 2010. Russo appeared just 12 times during this spell, partly due to injury, and scored just one goal.

=== Fourth spell with Catania ===
On 1 February 2010, Orazio Russo returned to the first professional club of his career, Calcio Catania. It was his fourth spell with the Sicilian giants. He was the second purchase of the winter transfer market for the club and its president Antonino Pulvirenti.

He made his first and only appearance with Catania in the final game of the season against Genoa C.F.C., which also marked his first Serie A appearance with his hometown team and his last game as a professional footballer, as he had announced his retirement at the end of the campaign.

== International career ==
Russo represented his country for the Italy U-21 in Serie C, coached by Roberto Boninsegna. He also played some matches with the Italian military national team.

== Coaching career ==
After retirement, Russo agreed to stay as part of the Catania coaching staff. From then on, he took on several roles at the club, both as first-team assistant and youth coach. On 21 October 2019, he was appointed caretaker manager of the main squad after the dismissal of Andrea Camplone. His caretaking spell ended on 22 October 2019 with the hiring of Cristiano Lucarelli.

== Death ==
Russo died from leukaemia in Catania, on 14 February 2026, at the age of 52.
