= Giovanni Arioli =

Italian footballer and coach

Personal information
- Date of birth: 23 April 1976 (age 50)
- Place of birth: Mantua, Italy
- Height: 1.77 m (5 ft 9 1/2 in)
- Position: Midfielder

Youth career
- Parma

Senior career*
| Years | Team | Apps | (Gls) |
| 1996 | Parma | 1 | (1) |
| 1996–1997 | Carpi | 2 | (0) |
| 1997–1998 | Lodigiani | 31 | (0) |
| 1998–2000 | Saronno | 37 | (1) |
| 2000–2004 | Pro Patria | 81 | (4) |
| 2004–2005 | Mantova | 28 | (3) |
| 2005–2006 | Pro Vercelli | 18 | (2) |
| 2006–2008 | Legnano | 44 | (5) |
| 2008 | Lumezzane | 12 | (0) |
| 2008–2009 | Ivrea | 14 | (0) |
| 2009–2010 | Legnano | 11 | (2) |
| 2010 | Pro Vercelli | 13 | (1) |
| 2010 | Caratese | 11 | (0) |
| 2010–2012 | Castiglione | 47 | (6) |
| 2012–2014 | Castellana | 75 | (11) |
| 2014–2016 | Olginatese | 53 | (6) |
| 2016–2017 | Darfo Boario | 12 | (1) |
| 2017 | AC Vigasio | 15 | (0) |

Managerial career
- 2017–2018: Olginatese
- 2019: Villafranca
- 2020: Villafranca
- * Club domestic league appearances and goals

Giovanni Arioli (born 23 April 1976) is an Italian football coach and a former player who played as a midfielder.

== Playing career ==
After playing in Parma youth teams, he made his debut in Serie A on 10 March 1996 against Piacenza and scored one goal. After that, he played in many teams in Serie C1 and Serie C2.

In January 2010, he left for Pro Belvedere Vercelli and made his league debut on 13 January 2010 against Crociati Noceto.

== Coaching career ==
On 25 May 2019, he was hired by Serie D club Villafranca. He was sacked in November 2019. He was re-appointed in the same position in February 2020. In the summer 2020, he was replaced by Paolo Corghi.
