= Fabio Lupo =

Italian footballer

Personal information
- Date of birth: 11 October 1964 (age 62)
- Place of birth: Pescara, Italy
- Height: 1.80 m (5 ft 11 in)
- Position: Midfielder

Team information
- Current team: SPAL (sporting director)

Senior career*
Years	Team	Apps	(Gls)
1980–1984	Francavilla	37	(4)
1982–1983	→ Cesena (loan)	0	(0)
1984–1987	Campobasso	108	(3)
1987–1991	Bari	81	(3)
1991–1994	Ancona	71	(11)
1994–1995	Avellino	20	(1)
1995–1996	Teramo	4	(0)
- * Club domestic league appearances and goals

Fabio Lupo (born 11 October 1964) is an Italian football director and former midfielder.

He is currently working with Excluded club SPAL as their sporting director.

== Playing career ==
Lupo's playing career started at Francavilla. In 1984 he joined Campobasso, with whom he made his Serie B debut. He successively moved to Bari, where he won promotion to Serie A and later made his top flight debut.

In 1991, Lupo joined Ancona, being part of the squad that won a historical first ever promotion to Serie A in the club's history.

== Managerial career ==
After retirement, Lupo took on a career as a football director. His main roles were at Torino from 2007 to 2009, Palermo from 2017 to 2018, Venezia from 2019 to 2020. He was successively hired by SPAL in 2022.
