= Antonio De Vitis =

Italian footballer (born 1964)

Personal information
- Date of birth: 16 May 1964 (age 62)
- Place of birth: Lecce, Italy
- Position: Forward

Team information
- Current team: Piacenza (technical director)

Senior career*
Years	Team	Apps	(Gls)
1982–1983	Napoli	1	(0)
1983–1984	Campania	27	(7)
1984–1985	Palermo	24	(8)
1985–1986	Salernitana	25	(16)
1986–1988	Taranto	71	(28)
1988–1991	Udinese	74	(20)
1991–1995	Piacenza	120	(49)
1995–1999	Hellas Verona	107	(38)
- * Club domestic league appearances and goals

Antonio "Totò" De Vitis (born 16 May 1964) is a retired Italian footballer who played as a striker.

== Playing career ==
A prolific striker, De Vitis started his career with Napoli, making his Serie A debut with the Campanian club in a home game against Genoa. He successively started a career in the minor leagues of Italian football; in 1988, after winning promotion to the top flight with Udinese, he returned to play at Serie A level.

In 1991, De Vitis signed for newly-promoted Serie B club Piacenza, becoming a star player for the Biancorossi and a major factor in the club's promotion to Serie A in 1993 and the following campaigns in the Italian top flight. He left Piacenza in 1995 to sign for Hellas Verona, playing for the Gialloblu until 1999.

== Post-playing career ==
On 1 November 2023, De Vitis returned to Piacenza as the club's new technical director, working alongside sporting director Alessio Sestu.

== Personal life ==
He is the father of professional footballer Alessandro De Vitis.
