= Nicola Caccia =

Italian footballer

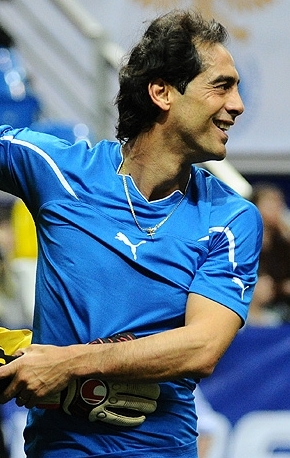
- Caccia in 2011

Personal information
- Date of birth: 10 April 1970 (age 56)
- Place of birth: Castello di Cisterna, Italy
- Height: 1.83 m (6 ft 0 in)
- Position: Forward

Team information
- Current team: FC Séville (technical collaborator)

Senior career*
| Years | Team | Apps | (Gls) |
| 1987–1991 | Empoli | 73 | (11) |
| 1991 | Bari | 7 | (0) |
| 1991–1992 | Modena | 24 | (3) |
| 1992–1995 | Ancona | 93 | (24) |
| 1995–1996 | Piacenza | 33 | (14) |
| 1996–1997 | Napoli | 33 | (7) |
| 1997–2000 | Atalanta | 101 | (40) |
| 2000–2003 | Piacenza | 71 | (25) |
| 2003 | Como | 16 | (5) |
| 2002–2005 | Genoa | 73 | (13) |
| Total | | 523 | (142) |

Managerial career
- 2006: Biellese
- 2007: Biellese
- 2007: Sangiovannese
- * Club domestic league appearances and goals

Nicola Caccia (born 10 April 1970) is an Italian former professional footballer who played as a forward.

== Playing career ==
Caccia made his breakthrough with the Tuscan club Empoli, where he made his first team debut at the age of 17. Following brief stints with Bari and Modena, Caccia rose to prominence with Ancona, which resulted in a transfer to Piacenza in Serie A in the summer of 1995.

Caccia scored 14 goals in Serie A for Piacenza, and was one of the main surprises in the 1995–96 Serie A season. Napoli was a bigger club than Piacenza, and had suffered from a lack of goals scored ever since Daniel Fonseca left a couple of years earlier. Caccia was Napoli's main signing in the summer of 1996, but despite being club topscorer, failed to impress with merely seven goals. Instead, Atalanta bought Caccia as replacement for Filippo Inzaghi. In three seasons with the Bergamo club, Caccia scored 40 goals, albeit the final two seasons were spent in Serie B, since Atalanta were relegated in 1998.

Caccia then moved back to Piacenza, where he had a pretty good goals per game ratio, but also were tested positive for doping, leading to a six-month suspension. Caccia was not fired by Piacenza and played there until 2003, before joining Como, before finishing his career at Genoa.

== Coaching career ==
In July 2006 Caccia took charge of Serie C2 club Biellese; after being sacked in September 2006 and reappointed back in January 2007, he however failed to save his team from relegation.

In July 2007 he was named new head coach of Serie C1 club Sangiovannese, but dismissed in October due to poor results.

In July 2011 he accepted an offer to work as assistant coach of Livorno under Walter Novellino and successively Nicola Madonna. In July 2012 he was called by Vincenzo Montella to work alongside him as new technical collaborator of Fiorentina.

In 2014, he obtained a UEFA Pro Licence.
