= Francesco Turrini =

Italian footballer and coach

Personal information
- Date of birth: 18 October 1965 (age 61)
- Place of birth: Foligno, Italy
- Position: Midfielder

Team information
- Current team: Fiorenzuola (youth coach)

Senior career*
| Years | Team | Apps | (Gls) |
| 1983–1987 | Sambenedettese | 58 | (7) |
| 1987–1989 | Parma | 53 | (4) |
| 1989–1990 | Como | 30 | (0) |
| 1990–1992 | Taranto | 54 | (6) |
| 1992–1996 | Piacenza | 133 | (13) |
| 1996–2000 | Napoli | 109 | (18) |
| 2000–2001 | Ancona | 8 | (2) |

Managerial career
- 2005–2006: Piacenza U15
- 2006: Palazzolo
- 2007–2008: Crociati Noceto
- 2012–2015: Parma (youth)
- 2015–2020: Sassuolo (youth)
- 2021–2023: Fiorenzuola (youth)
- 2023: Fiorenzuola
- 2023–: Fiorenzuola (youth)
- * Club domestic league appearances and goals as of 10 October 2012

Francesco Turrini (born 18 October 1965 in Foligno) is an Italian footballer who played as a right winger. He is the Under-19 youth coach of Fiorenzuola.

== Playing career ==
After a career entirely in Serie B with Sambenedettese, Parma, Como and Taranto before moving to Piacenza in 1992. He enjoyed two promotions to Serie A and earned a reputation as a skillful winger with an eye for goal.

He moved to Napoli in 1996 and would be seen as one of the better performers in a particularly bleak period for the club. He finished his career with Ancona.

== Coaching career ==
After youth and senior roles at smaller clubs, Turrini joined the technical staff of Parma's two most senior youth sides. He successively served as youth coach for Sassuolo before joining Fiorenzuola as the club's new Under-19 coach in 2021.

On 17 October 2023, Turrini was promoted head coach of Fiorenzuola, taking charge of the first team in the Serie C league. On 31 December 2023, Fiorenzuola announced to have moved Turrini back to his previous role in charge of the Under-19 team.
