= Stadio del Conero =

Football stadium

Coordinates: 43.564°N 13.526°E

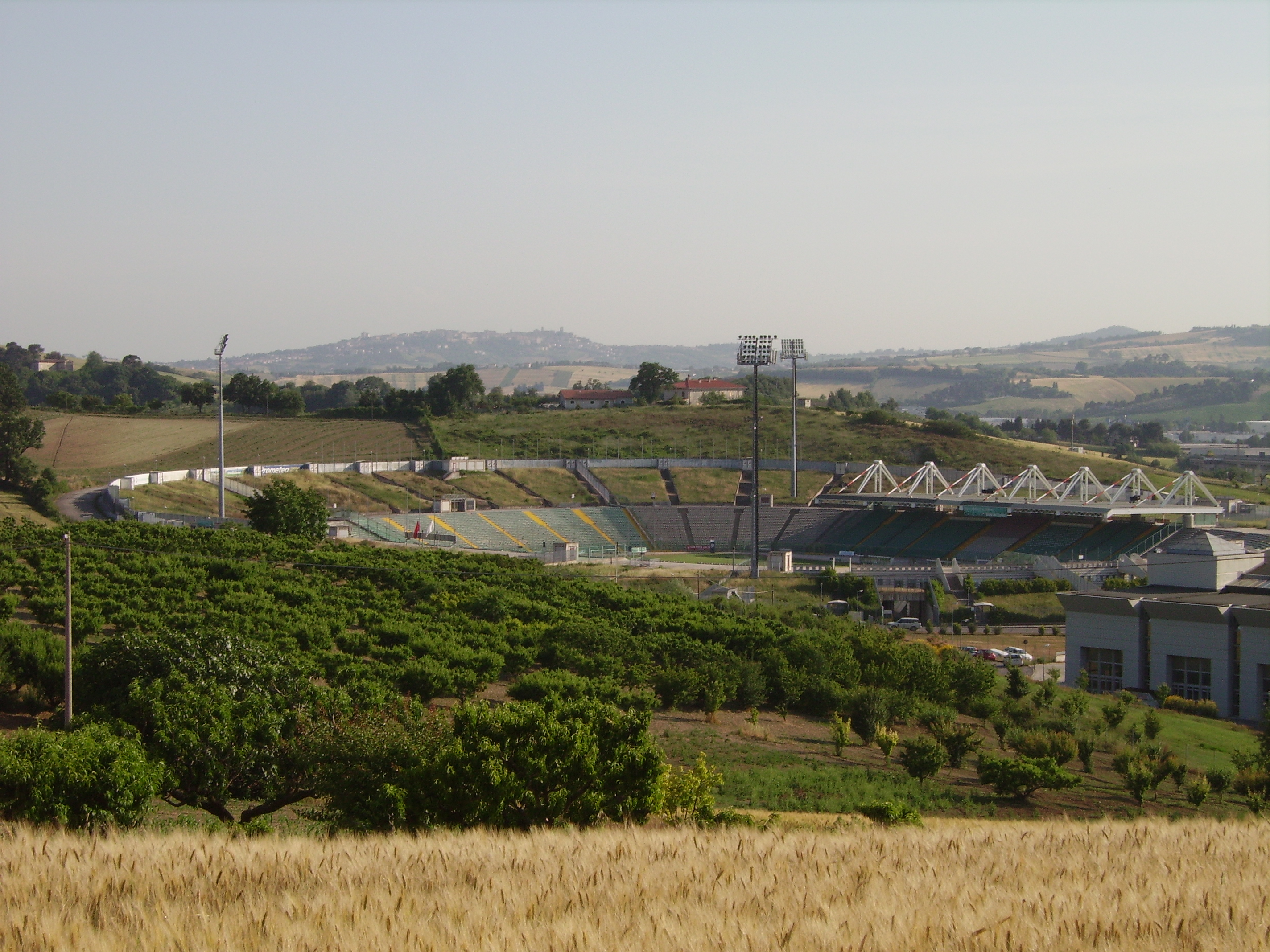
- Interactive map of Stadio del Conero
- Location: Ancona, Italy
- Owner: Municipality of Ancona
- Capacity: 23,967
- Surface: Grass; 105x68m

Construction
- Groundbreaking: 1992
- Opened: 6 December 1992

Tenant
A.C. Ancona	(1992–2010)
U.S. Ancona 1905	(2010–2017)
SSC Ancona ASD	(2017–)
Italy national football team	(selected matches)

Stadio del Conero was the home field of the Italian football club A.C. Ancona until 2010 when the club declared bankruptcy and was subsequently excluded by every league.

Currently it is the home of SSC Ancona ASD.

It is an all seater built in 1992 with a capacity of 23,967.

== International matches ==
Three international matches of the Italy national football team have taken place at the stadium:

Date	Match	Score	Stage	Attendance
31 March 1999	Italy – Belarus	1–1	European Championship Qualifying match	20,735
11 October 2000	Italy – Georgia	2–0	World Cup Qualifying match	18,593
16 November 2003	Italy – Romania	1–0	Friendly match	11,700
