= AC Ancona =

Defunct Italian football club

Ancona
- Full name: Associazione Calcio Ancona S.p.A.
- Nicknames: I Dorici (The Dorians); I Biancorossi (The Red and Whites)
- Founded: 1905; 121 years ago (Ancona Calcio); 2004; 22 years ago (AC Ancona)
- Dissolved: 2010; 16 years ago
- Ground: Stadio del Conero
- Capacity: 23,967

Associazione Calcio Ancona, commonly referred to as Ancona, was an Italian football club based in Ancona, Marche. It was founded in 2004 as the phoenix club of defunct 1905 club Unione Sportiva Anconitana, which changed its name to Ancona Calcio in 1982. It used clause in the Article 52 of N.O.I.F. with its last denomination. In 2010 it went bankrupt. Another club of the city, U.S. Ancona 1905 claimed as the phoenix club. However, the club also folded in 2017, with a second phoenix club, A.C. Anconitana, was founded in the Eccellenza. They merged with S.S. Matelica Calcio 1921 to found SSC Ancona ASD.

The nicknames of the team were i Dorici (The Dorians) and i Biancorossi (The Red and Whites).

== History ==
=== From U.S. Anconitana to Ancona Calcio ===
Ancona had spells in Serie B before World War II and shortly after, but would not return to that level until 1988. Under coach Vincenzo Guerini, the club's rise was meteoric: 5th place in 1990 and promotion was achieved two years later. Although they would finish 17th and were relegated after just one year, the club nonetheless played in some memorable high-scoring games including a 3–0 home win over Inter. Midfielder Lajos Detari, winger Fabio Lupo and striker Massimo Agostini ensured Ancona had a respectable Goals For tally but conceded goals at an alarming rate.

The following year, Ancona reached a Coppa Italia final but were heavily beaten by Sampdoria. Near misses in the promotion race was followed by relegation in 1996 and again in 1998. After returning to Serie B in 2000, Ancona would achieve another promotion in 2003.

Its second Serie A season would be one of the worst of any Serie A club, with a record-equalling 28-game winless streak from the start. They finished the season with a pitiful 13 points. This was followed by bankruptcy and condemnation to Serie C2.

=== AC Ancona ===
Ancona finished 5th in 2005–2006 season and lost promotion play-off against Sassuolo by finishing best place but promoted after expulsions of Gela and Sassari Torres due to financial troubles. They finished 16th in Serie C1/B and played relegation play-off against Teramo in 2006–2007 season. Ancona won 4–2 by aggregate and remained in Serie C1.

In October 2007 it was reported that Centro Sportivo Italiano (CSI), run by the Vatican's Conference of Bishops, had purchased an 80% share in the club. The report read:

"It is a way to moralise football, to bring some ethics to a sector that is going through a deep crisis of values," said Ancona Archbishop Edoardo Menichelli, who recently played a benefit game against an Italy national team of singers.

CSI president Edio Costantini said the centre wanted "to invest in the true meaning of sport. We want football to be again a means of education and not tied to strictly monetary values".

"We will show that, for boys, football is not just an illusion or a bad example."

According to Catholic World News on 9 October 2007, the Vatican was distancing itself from the move, claiming the CSI was a group of 'lay Catholics' and the Vatican had 'nothing to do' with the project. Yet in a Reuters report on 11 October 2007, both the Vatican Secretary of State and the Pope endorsed the move, quoted as saying respectively:

Vatican Secretary of State Cardinal Tarcisio Bertone praised the project in a statement read at its presentation, saying it was designed to 'bring out the human and spiritual values in sport'.

Pope Benedict XVI also encouraged the team after receiving a shirt with his name and the number 16 on from them at a general audience in St Peter's Square

The club has had several Papal connections. The 'Project Soccer' initiative was blessed by Pope Benedict XVI with a letter sent by Cardinal Tarcisio Bertone to the Centro Sportivo Italiano. The 'Del Conero' stadium was visited by Pope John Paul II twice.

The club has been promoted back to Serie B after winning promotion playoff after defeating Perugia by finished best place and Taranto by 2–1 aggregate in 2007–2008 season. Ancona finished 19th at Serie B at next season and faced with Rimini at play-outs. Ancona won them with a 2–1 aggregate and remained in it.

==== The liquidation ====
Ancona played the 2009–10 season in Serie B, finishing 17th despite 2 points deduction due to financial irregularities in the season and avoiding relegation, but eventually filed for bankruptcy and was unable to join any of the lower divisions. The club, however, managed to submit application for a place in Terza Categoria, the lowest level of the Italian football league system. Their application was accepted on 13 September 2010, as they were granted a playing ground by the city administration. However, they were still lacking players and a manager and were subsequently forced to forfeit the first four games of the season. According to FIGC regulations, this led to the club's removal from the league and they underwent liquidation.

== Notable former players ==
This list of former players includes those who received international caps while playing for the team, made significant contributions to the team in terms of appearances or goals while playing for the team, or who made significant contributions to the sport either before they played for the team, or after they left. It is clearly not yet complete and all inclusive, and additions and refinements will continue to be made over time.

- (Argentina) Sergio Zárate
- (Australia) Nick Rizzo
- (Australia) Max Vieri
- (Brazil) Jardel
- (Croatia) Igor Budan
- (Croatia) Tomislav Erceg
- (Croatia) Milan Rapaić
- (Denmark) Mads Jørgensen
- (Gabon) Catilina Aubameyang
- (Hungary) Lajos Détári
- (Hungary) Gyula Zsengellér
- (Italy) Dino Baggio
- (Italy) Nicola Caccia
- (Italy) Beniamino Di Giacomo
- (Italy) Francesco Flachi
- (Italy) Maurizio Ganz
- (Italy) Dario Hübner
- (Italy) Carlo Mattrel
- (Italy) Alessandro Melli
- (Italy) Anselmo Robbiati
- (Italy) Luigi Sartor
- (Italy) Salvatore Sirigu
- (North Macedonia) Goran Pandev
- (Poland) Marek Koźmiński
- (Brazil) Guilherme Siqueira
- (Senegal) Mohamed Sarr
- (Slovakia) Miloš Glonek
- (Sweden) Daniel Andersson
- (Uruguay) Juan Surraco

== Former managers ==
See Category:AC Ancona managers.

== Supporters and rivalries ==
The main rivals of Ancona was Ascoli.

== Phoenix clubs ==
Two illegitimate phoenix clubs had formed in Ancona:

- U.S. Ancona 1905, existed between 2010 and 2017
- SSC Ancona ASD, exists since 2021 (formerly A.C. Anconitana between 2017 and 2021)
