= 1992 FC Dynamo Kyiv season =

Dynamo Kyiv
1992 season
- President: Viktor Bezverkhyi
- Manager: Anatoliy Puzach
- Stadium: Republic Stadium; Dynamo Stadium
- Vyshcha Liha: 1992 Vyshcha Liha
- Ukrainian Cup: Second preliminary round (1/16)
- Soviet Cup: Quarterfinals (1/4)
- European Cup: Group stage
| Home colours | Away colours |

The 1992 season was the first season in the top Ukrainian football league for Dynamo Kyiv. Dynamo competed in Vyshcha Liha, and Ukrainian Cup.

== Players ==
=== Squad information ===
| Squad no. | Name | Nationality | Position | Date of birth (age) | Signed from | Signed in |
Goalkeepers
| 11 | Ihor Kutepov | (Ukraine) | GK | 17 December 1965 (aged 26) | Metalist Kharkiv | 1991 |
| 14 | Valdemaras Martinkėnas | (Lithuania) | GK | 10 March 1965 (aged 27) | Žalgiris Vilnius | 1991 |
Defenders
| 1 | Andrey Aleksanenkov | (Russia) | DF | 27 March 1969 (aged 23) | Dynamo Moscow | 1990 |
| 2 | Andriy Annenkov | (Ukraine) | DF | 21 January 1969 (aged 23) | Iskra Smolensk | 1990 |
| 3 | Anatoliy Bezsmertnyi | (Ukraine) | DF | 21 January 1969 (aged 23) | Pryladyst Mukacheve | 1991 |
| 8 | Serhiy Zayets | (Ukraine) | DF | 18 August 1969 (aged 22) | RVUFK Kyiv | 1986 |
| 13 | Oleh Luzhnyi | (Ukraine) | DF | 5 August 1968 (aged 23) | SKA Karpaty Lviv | 1989 |
| 18 | Yervand Sukiasyan | (Armenia) | DF | 20 January 1967 (aged 25) | Ararat Yerevan | 1992 |
| 19 | Akhrik Tsveiba | (Ukraine) | DF | 10 September 1966 (aged 25) | Dinamo Tbilisi | 1990 |
| 21 | Serhiy Shmatovalenko | (Ukraine) | DF | 20 January 1967 (aged 25) | CSKA Moscow | 1987 |
Midfielders
| 4 | Stepan Betsa | (Ukraine) | MF | 29 June 1970 (aged 21) | Metalurh Zaporizhia | 1990 |
| 5 | Oleh Volotek | (Ukraine) | MF | 15 August 1967 (aged 24) | Zorya Luhansk | 1992 |
| 9 | Gintaras Kvitkauskas | (Lithuania) | MF | 3 January 1967 (aged 25) | Pakhtakor Tashkent | 1992 |
| 10 | Serhiy Kovalets | (Ukraine) | MF | 5 September 1968 (aged 23) | Podillia Khmelnytskyi | 1990 |
| 16 | Yuriy Moroz | (Ukraine) | MF | 8 September 1970 (aged 21) | SKA Kiev | 1987 |
| 20 | Volodymyr Sharan | (Ukraine) | MF | 18 September 1971 (aged 20) | Karpaty Lviv | 1991 |
| 22 | Pavlo Yakovenko (c) | (Ukraine) | MF | 19 December 1964 (aged 27) | Metalist Kharkiv | 1982 |
Forwards
| 6 | Yuriy Hrytsyna | (Ukraine) | FW | 15 June 1971 (aged 21) | Zorya Luhansk | 1990 |
| 7 | Valery Yesipov | (Russia) | FW | 4 October 1971 (aged 20) | Fakel Voronezh | 1992 |
| 12 | Viktor Leonenko | (Ukraine) | FW | 5 October 1969 (aged 22) | Dynamo Moscow | 1992 |
| 15 | Oleh Matveyev | (Ukraine) | FW | 18 August 1970 (aged 21) | Rostselmash Rostov-na-Donu | 1989 |
| 17 | Oleg Salenko | (Ukraine) | FW | 25 October 1969 (aged 22) | Zenit Leningrad | 1989 |

== Transfers ==
=== In ===
| Date | Pos. | Player | Moving from | Fee | Source |
|---|---|---|---|---|---|
| | DF | Yervand Sukiasyan | Ararat Yerevan | | |
| | MF | Oleh Volotyok | Zorya Luhansk | | |
| | MF | Gintaras Kvitkauskas | Pakhtakor Tashkent | | |
| | FW | Valery Yesipov | Fakel Voronezh | | |
| | FW | Viktor Leonenko | Dynamo Moscow | | |

=== Out ===
| Date | Pos. | Player | Moving to | Fee | Source |
|---|---|---|---|---|---|
| | FW | Valery Yesipov | Rotor Volgograd | | |
| | FW | Oleg Salenko | CD Logroñés | | |
| | FW | Oleh Matveev | Shakhtar Donetsk | | |
| | MF | Pavlo Yakovenko | Sochaux-Montbéliard | | |

== Competitions ==
=== Overall ===
| Competition | First match | Last match | Starting round | Final position | Record | | | | | | | |
| Competition | First match | Last match | Starting round | Final position | Pld | W | D | L | GF | GA | GD | Win % |
|---|---|---|---|---|---|---|---|---|---|---|---|---|
| Vyshcha Liha | 7 March 1992 | 21 June 1992 | Matchday 1 | 2nd | 19 | 13 | 4 | 2 | 31 | 14 | +17 | 68.42 |
| Cup | 28 February 1992 | 3 May 1992 | Round of 16 (1/8) | Quarterfinals (1/4) | 4 | 1 | 2 | 1 | 4 | 4 | +0 | 25.00 |
| Soviet Cup | 4 September 1991 | 22 November 1991 | Round of 32 (1/16) | withdrawal | 3 | 3 | 0 | 0 | 10 | 1 | +9 | 100.00 |
| European Cup | 18 September 1991 | 15 April 1992 | First round (1/16) | Group stage (4th in Gr.B) | 10 | 5 | 1 | 4 | 9 | 13 | −4 | 50.00 |
| Total | | | | | 36 | 22 | 7 | 7 | 54 | 32 | +22 | 61.11 |

Source: Competitions

=== Premier League ===
==== League table ====
| Pos | Team | Pld | W | D | L | GF | GA | GD | Pts | Qualification or relegation |
|---|---|---|---|---|---|---|---|---|---|---|
| 1 | Dynamo Kyiv | 18 | 13 | 4 | 1 | 31 | 13 | +18 | 30 | Qualification to Final playoff |
| 2 | Dnipro Dnipropetrovsk (O) | 18 | 10 | 3 | 5 | 26 | 15 | +11 | 23 | Qualification to Third place playoff |
| 3 | Metalist Kharkiv (Note: Participant of the 1992 Ukrainian Cup Final) | 18 | 8 | 5 | 5 | 21 | 16 | +5 | 21 | |
| 4 | Nyva Ternopil | 18 | 8 | 5 | 5 | 16 | 12 | +4 | 21 | |
| 5 | Volyn Lutsk | 18 | 8 | 2 | 8 | 24 | 21 | +3 | 18 | |

Rules for classification: 1st points; 2nd wins; 3rd goal difference
(O) Play-off winners

==== Results summary ====
| Overall | | | | | | | | Home | | | | | | Away | | | | | |
| Pld | W | D | L | GF | GA | GD | Pts | W | D | L | GF | GA | GD | W | D | L | GF | GA | GD |
|---|---|---|---|---|---|---|---|---|---|---|---|---|---|---|---|---|---|---|---|
| 18 | 13 | 4 | 1 | 31 | 13 | +18 | 43 | 8 | 1 | 0 | 17 | 6 | +11 | 5 | 3 | 1 | 14 | 7 | +7 |

Source: 1992 Dynamo season

==== Results by round ====
| Round | 1 | 2 | 3 | 4 | 5 | 6 | 7 | 8 | 9 | 10 | 11 | 12 | 13 | 14 | 15 | 16 | 17 | 18 | 19 | 20 |
|---|---|---|---|---|---|---|---|---|---|---|---|---|---|---|---|---|---|---|---|---|
| Ground | H | H | | A | A | A | H | H | A | A | H | H | A | A | H | H | H | | A | A |
| Result | W | W | | W | D | D | D | W | W | W | W | W | W | D | W | W | W | | L | W |
| Position | 2 | 2 | 3 | 1 | 2 | 2 | 2 | 1 | 1 | 1 | 1 | 1 | 1 | 1 | 1 | 1 | 1 | 1 | 1 | 1 |

Source: 1992 Dynamo season
A = Away; H = Home; W = Win; D = Draw; L = Loss

==== Matches ====
| 7 March 1992 1 | Dynamo Kyiv | 2–1 | Metalist Kharkiv | Kyiv |
| ?:? EET (UTC+02:00) | Hrytsyna 3'; Sukiasyan 24' | Report | Pryzetko 55' | Stadium: Republican Stadium; Attendance: 1,500; Referee: Yaroslav Hrysyo |

| 10 March 1992 2 | Dynamo Kyiv | 1–0 | Naftovyk Okhtyrka | Kyiv |
| ?:? EET (UTC+02:00) | Salenko 50'; Yakovenko (yellow card) 64' | Report | Zadorozhnyi (penalty missed) 52' | Stadium: Republican Stadium; Attendance: 1,900; Referee: Valeriy Lysenko |

| 23 March 1992 4 | SKA Odesa | 1–3 | Dynamo Kyiv | Odesa |
| ?:? EET (UTC+02:00) | Tutychenko 85' | Report | Hrytsyna 15'; Salenko 30' (pen.), 67' | Stadium: SKA Stadium; Attendance: 6,000; Referee: Leonid Bavykin |

| 27 March 1992 5 | Prykarpattia Ivano-Frankivsk | 0–0 | Dynamo Kyiv | Ivano-Frankivsk |
| ?:? EET (UTC+02:00) | | Report | | Stadium: Elektron Stadium; Attendance: 15,000; Referee: Yaroslav Hrysyo |

| 23 April 1992 6 (postponed) | Bukovyna Chernivtsi | 0–0 | Dynamo Kyiv | Chernivtsi |
| ?:? EET (UTC+02:00) | | Report | Luzhnyi (yellow card) 30' | Stadium: Bukovyna Stadium; Attendance: 14,000; Referee: Valeriy Avdysh |

| 5 April 1992 7 | Dynamo Kyiv | 2–2 | Dnipro Dnipropetrovsk | Kyiv |
| ?:? EET (UTC+02:00) | Luzhnyi 52'; Hrytsyna 64' | Report | Konovalov 15'; Moskvyn 56'; Mamchur (yellow card) 58' | Stadium: Republican Stadium; Attendance: 4,000; Referee: Leonid Bavykin |

| 8 April 1992 8 | Dynamo Kyiv | 2–1 | Zorya-MALS Luhansk | Kyiv |
| ?:? EET (UTC+02:00) | Sharan 19'; Hrytsyna 62' | Report | Martynenko (yellow card) 52'; Sevidov (penalty missed) 70'; Huseinov 88' | Stadium: Republican Stadium; Attendance: 5,000; Referee: Volodymyr Tukhovskyi |

| 3 June 1992 9 (postponed) | Volyn Lutsk | 2–3 | Dynamo Kyiv | Lutsk |
| ?:? EET (UTC+02:00) | Topchiev 72', 82' | Report | Betsa 15'; Kovalets 44'; Luzhnyi 53'; Sharan (yellow card) 85' | Stadium: Avanhard Stadium; Attendance: 20,000; Referee: Mykhailo Sydor |

| 20 April 1992 10 | Nyva Ternopil | 0–2 | Dynamo Kyiv | Ternopil |
| ?:? EET (UTC+02:00) | Tsiselskyi (yellow card) 45'; Buts 70' (own) | Report | Salenko (yellow card) 65'; Volotyok 85' | Stadium: Central Stadium; Attendance: 20,000; Referee: Volodymyr Pianykh |

| 26 April 1992 11 | Dynamo Kyiv | 2–0 | Volyn Lutsk | Kyiv |
| ?:? EET (UTC+02:00) | Zayets 16'; Salenko 23' (pen.) | Report | Antonyuk (yellow card) 76' | Stadium: Republican Stadium; Attendance: 1,900; Referee: Yevhen Kanana |

| 14 May 1992 12 (postponed) | Dynamo Kyiv | 1–0 | Nyva Ternopil | Kyiv |
| ?:? EET (UTC+02:00) | Sukiasyan 30'; Leonenko (penalty missed) 68' | Report | Buts (yellow card) 81' | Stadium: Dynamo Stadium; Attendance: 280; Referee: Leonid Bavykin |

| 7 May 1992 13 | Dnipro Dnipropetrovsk | 0–1 | Dynamo Kyiv | Dnipropetrovsk |
| ?:? EEST (UTC+03:00) | Tyshchenko (yellow card) 24'; Maksymov (yellow card) 29'; Mamchur (yellow card) 37'; Horilyi (yellow card) 60' | Report | Volotyok (yellow card) 33', (goal) 52' | Stadium: Meteor Stadium; Attendance: 6,000; Referee: Volodymyr Tukhovskyi |

| 10 May 1992 14 | Zorya-MALS Luhansk | 1–1 | Dynamo Kyiv | Luhansk |
| ?:? EEST (UTC+03:00) | Sevidov 18'; Zuyenko (yellow card) 65' | Report | Yakovenko (yellow card) 35'; Leonenko 37', (yellow card) 65'; Luzhnyi (yellow card) 51' | Stadium: Avanhard Stadium; Attendance: 17,200; Referee: Volodomyr Pianykh |

| 18 May 1992 15 | Dynamo Kyiv | 2–0 | Prykarpattia Ivano-Frankivsk | Kyiv |
| ?:? EEST (UTC+03:00) | Salenko 55'; Bezsmertnyi (yellow card) 65'; Leonenko 84' | Report | Khomyn (yellow card) 75' | Stadium: Republican Stadium; Attendance: 1,700; Referee: Valeriy Avdysh |

| 22 May 1992 16 | Dynamo Kyiv | 1–0 | Bukovyna Chernivtsi | Kyiv |
| ?:? EEST (UTC+03:00) | Leonenko 53' | Report | | Stadium: Republican Stadium; Attendance: 3,500; Referee: Kostiantyn Panchyk |

| 6 June 1992 17 | Dynamo Kyiv | 4–2 | SC Odesa | Kyiv |
| ?:? EEST (UTC+03:00) | Sharan 30'; Salenko 46'; Yakovenko 60'; Matveev 67' | Report | Yeremeev 80'; Parakhnevych 85' | Stadium: Dynamo Stadium; Attendance: 2,500; Referee: Volodymyr Pianykh |

| 14 June 1992 19 | Metalist Kharkiv | 2–1 | Dynamo Kyiv | Kharkiv |
| ?:? EEST (UTC+03:00) | Pryzetko 42'; Khomukha 78' (pen.) | Report | Salenko 26' (pen.) | Stadium: Metalist Stadium; Attendance: 4,000; Referee: Valeriy Avdysh |

| 17 June 1992 20 | Naftovyk Okhtyrka | 1–3 | Dynamo Kyiv | Okhtyrka |
| ?:? EEST (UTC+03:00) | Yermak (yellow card) 63'; Hrachov 74' | Report | Hrytsyna 11', 22', 70' | Stadium: Naftovyk Stadium; Attendance: 3,500; Referee: Leonid Bavykin |

| 21 June 1992 Final | Tavriya Simferopol | 1–0 | Dynamo Kyiv | Lviv |
| ?:? EEST (UTC+03:00) | Vyšniauskas (yellow card) 64'; Shevchenko 75' | Report | | Stadium: Ukraina Stadium; Attendance: 36,000; Referee: Volodymyr Pianykh |

=== Ukrainian Cup ===
| 28 February 1992 Round of 16 (1/8) | Dynamo Kyiv | 1–1 | Skala Stryi | Kyiv |
| ?:? EET (UTC+02:00) | Tsveiba 37' | Report | Kardash 83' | Stadium: Republican Stadium; Attendance: 1,300; Referee: Valeriy Avdysh |

| 14 March 1992 Round of 16 (1/8) | Skala Stryi | 1–2 (a.e.t.) | Dynamo Kyiv | Stryi |
| ?:? EET (UTC+02:00) | Sydorenko 43' | Report | Annenkov 52'; Salenko 100' | Stadium: Sokil Stadium; Attendance: 17,000; Referee: Valeriy Avdysh |

| 11 April 1992 Quarterfinals (1/4) | Torpedo Zaporizhia | 1–0 | Dynamo Kyiv | Zaporizhia |
| ?:? EET (UTC+02:00) | Volkov 43' | Report | | Stadium: AvtoZAZ Stadium; Attendance: 8,000; Referee: Leonid Bavykin |

| 3 May 1992 Quarterfinals (1/4) | Dynamo Kyiv | 1–1 | Torpedo Zaporizhia | Kyiv |
| ?:? EET (UTC+02:00) | Yesipov 15' | Report | Zayets 59' | Stadium: Dynamo Stadium; Attendance: 1,487; Referee: Yaroslav Hrysyo |

=== Soviet Cup ===
At least three Ukrainian clubs qualified for the rounds that were conducted following the official dissolution of the Soviet Union. All of them withdrew the competition, including FC Dynamo Kyiv.

| 4 September 1991 Round of 32 (1/16) | Naftovyk Okhtyrka | 1–4 | Dynamo Kyiv | Okhtyrka |
| 18:30 | Tymchenko 64' | Report | Sharan 23'; Salenko 33', 69' (pen.); Moroz 54' | Stadium: Naftovyk Stadium; Attendance: 9,000; Referee: V. Modin |

| 15 November 1991 Round of 32 (1/16) | Dynamo Kyiv | 4–0 | Naftovyk Okhtyrka | Kyiv |
| ?:? | Salenko 21' (pen.); Moroz 60', 82'; Hrytsyna 69' | Report | | Stadium: Dynamo Stadium; Attendance: 300; Referee: Aleksandr Borisov |

| 22 November 1991 Round of 16 (1/8) | Dynamo Kyiv | 2–0 | Dynamo Minsk | Kyiv |
| ?:? | Sharan 15'; Salenko 51' | Report | | Stadium: Republican Stadium; Attendance: 3,000; Referee: Ivan Timoshenko |

| 26 November 1991 Round of 16 (1/8) | Dynamo Minsk | cancelled | Dynamo Kyiv |
| N/A | | Report |

=== European Cup ===
FC Dynamo Kyiv initially represented the Soviet Union (ephemeral CIS), later its records were adopted by Russia as the Soviet's only successor.

| 18 September 1991 First round (1/16) | HJK Helsinki | 0–1 | Dynamo Kyiv | Helsinki |
| ?:? | Jaakonsaari (yellow card) 41'; Litmanen (yellow card) 89' | Report | Kovalets 32'; Derkach (yellow card) 70' | Stadium: Helsinki Olympic Stadium |

| 2 October 1991 First round (1/16) | Dynamo Kyiv | 3–0 | HJK Helsinki | Kyiv |
| ?:? | Kovalets 28'; Moroz 48'; Hrytsyna 72' | Report | Heinola (yellow card) 44' | Stadium: Dynamo Stadium |

| 23 October 1991 Second round (1/8) | Dynamo Kyiv | 1–1 | Brøndby IF | Kyiv |
| ?:? | Shmatovalenko (yellow card) 67'; Sharan (yellow card) 69'; Salenko 77' (pen.) | Report | Nielsen 12'; Krogh (yellow card) 76' | Stadium: Dynamo Stadium |

| 6 November 1991 Second round (1/8) | Brøndby IF | 0–1 | Dynamo Kyiv | Brøndby |
| ?:? | | Report | Yakovenko 6', (red card) 44'; Kovalets (yellow card) 37'; Salenko (yellow card) 71'; Moroz (yellow card) 83'; Kutepov (yellow card) 85' | Stadium: Brøndby Stadium |

==== Group stage ====
| Pos | Team | Pld | W | D | L | GF | GA | GD | Pts | Qualification | BAR | SPP | BEN | DKV |
|---|---|---|---|---|---|---|---|---|---|---|---|---|---|---|
| 1 | (Spain) Barcelona | 6 | 4 | 1 | 1 | 10 | 4 | +6 | 9 | Advance to final | — | 3–2 | 2–1 | 3–0 |
| 2 | (Czechoslovakia) Sparta Prague | 6 | 2 | 2 | 2 | 7 | 7 | 0 | 6 | | 1–0 | — | 1–1 | 2–1 |
| 3 | (Portugal) Benfica | 6 | 1 | 3 | 2 | 8 | 5 | +3 | 5 | | 0–0 | 1–1 | — | 5–0 |
| 4 | (Commonwealth of Independent States) Dynamo Kyiv | 6 | 2 | 0 | 4 | 3 | 12 | −9 | 4 | | 0–2 | 1–0 | 1–0 | — |

Source: UEFA

| 27 November 1991 1 (Group B) | Dynamo Kyiv | 1–0 | Benfica | Kyiv |
| 19:00 | Aleksanenkov (yellow card) 25'; Salenko 31' | Report | Madeira (yellow card) 3'; Schwarz (yellow card) 22' | Stadium: Republican Stadium; Attendance: 80,000; Referee: Keith Hackett |

| 11 December 1991 2 (Group B) | Sparta Prague | 2–1 | Dynamo Kyiv | Prague |
| 18:00 | Němeček 13'; Vrabec 22'; Lavička (yellow card) 73' | Report | Aleksanenkov (yellow card) 10'; Tsveiba (yellow card) 25'; Sharan 55' | Stadium: Letná Stadium; Attendance: 14,639; Referee: Rosario Lo Bello |

| 4 March 1992 3 (Group B) | Dynamo Kyiv | 0–2 | Barcelona | Kyiv |
| 20:00 | Bezsmertnyi (yellow card) 59' | Report | Stoichkov 33'; Salinas 66' | Stadium: Dynamo Stadium; Attendance: 48,500; Referee: Guy Goethals |

| 18 March 1992 4 (Group B) | Barcelona | 3–0 | Dynamo Kyiv | Barcelona |
| 20:45 | Stoichkov (yellow card) 42', (goal) 60', 81'; Salinas 88' | Report | Zayets (yellow card) 14'; Moroz (red card) 58' | Stadium: Camp Nou; Attendance: 53,000; Referee: Karl-Josef Assenmacher |

| 1 April 1992 5 (Group B) | Benfica | 5–0 | Dynamo Kyiv | Lisbon |
| 21:00 | Thern (yellow card) 32'; Brito 25', 62'; Isaías 71'; Yuran 83', 87' | Report | Bezsmertnyi (yellow card) 51'; Annenkov (yellow card) 53'; Zayets (yellow card) 55' | Stadium: Estádio da Luz; Attendance: 78,000; Referee: Mario van der Ende |

| 15 April 1992 6 (Group B) | Dynamo Kyiv | 1–0 | Sparta Praha | Kyiv |
| 21:00 | Sharan (yellow card) 59'; Salenko 84' | Report | Siegl (yellow card) 89'; Novotný (red card) 90' | Stadium: Dynamo Stadium; Attendance: 5,000; Referee: Brian McGinlay |
