= 1991–92 European Cup first round =

Football competition

The 1991–92 European Cup first round was the first stage of the 1991–92 European Cup competition, and featured 32 teams entering the competition. It began on 17 September with the first legs and ended on 2 October 1991 with the second legs. The 16 winners advanced to the second round.

Times are CET/CEST, (Note: CEST (UTC+2) for dates up to 28 September 1991 (first legs), and CET (UTC+1) for dates thereafter (second legs).) as listed by UEFA.

== Teams ==
All 32 teams qualified for the European Cup entered in the first round.

Key to colours
Winners of first round advanced to second round

First round participants

Team	Coeff.
(Socialist Federal Republic of Yugoslavia) Red Star Belgrade	1.586
(France) Marseille	1.800
(Sweden) IFK Göteborg	1.636
(Italy) Sampdoria	1.625
(Portugal) Benfica	1.518
(Spain) Barcelona	1.447
(Belgium) Anderlecht	1.424
(Soviet Union) Dynamo Kyiv	1.363

Team	Coeff.
(Denmark) Brøndby	1.250
(Scotland) Rangers	1.227
(Netherlands) PSV Eindhoven	1.173
Austria Wien	1.000
(Germany) 1. FC Kaiserslautern	1.000
(Hungary) Kispest Honvéd	1.000
(Romania) Universitatea Craiova	1.000
(Greece) Panathinaikos	0.850

Team	Coeff.
(Czechoslovakia) Sparta Prague	0.785
(Cyprus) Apollon Limassol	0.750
(Turkey) Beşiktaş	0.750
(Norway) Rosenborg	0.750
(Albania) Flamurtari	0.666
(Switzerland) Grasshopper	0.666
(Finland) HJK	0.666
(Malta) Hamrun Spartans	0.333

Team	Coeff.
(Iceland) Fram	0.250
Union Luxembourg	0.125
(England) Arsenal	0.000
(Republic of Ireland) Dundalk	0.000
(Bulgaria) Etar Veliko Tarnovo	0.000
(Germany) Hansa Rostock	0.000
(Northern Ireland) Portadown	0.000
(Poland) Zagłębie Lubin	0.000

Notes

1. ^{TH} Title holders

== Format ==
Each tie was played over two legs, with each team playing one leg at home. The team that scored more goals on aggregate over the two legs advanced to the next round. If the aggregate score was level, the away goals rule was applied, i.e. the team that scored more goals away from home over the two legs advanced. If away goals were also equal, then extra time was played. The away goals rule would be again applied after extra time, i.e. if there were goals scored during extra time and the aggregate score was still level, the visiting team advanced by virtue of more away goals scored. If no goals were scored during extra time, the tie was decided by penalty shoot-out.

== Seeding ==
The draw for the first round was held on 11 July 1991 in Geneva, Switzerland. The 32 teams were divided into a seeded and unseeded pot, each containing 16 teams, for the draw.

Seeded		Unseeded	
(Socialist Federal Republic of Yugoslavia) Red Star Belgrade; (France) Marseille; (Sweden) IFK Göteborg; (Italy) Sampdoria; (Portugal) Benfica; (Spain) Barcelona; (Belgium) Anderlecht; (Soviet Union) Dynamo Kyiv	(Denmark) Brøndby; (Scotland) Rangers; (Netherlands) PSV Eindhoven; Austria Wien; (Germany) 1. FC Kaiserslautern; (Hungary) Kispest Honvéd; (Romania) Universitatea Craiova; (Greece) Panathinaikos	(Czechoslovakia) Sparta Prague; (Cyprus) Apollon Limassol; (Turkey) Beşiktaş; (Norway) Rosenborg; (Albania) Flamurtari; (Switzerland) Grasshopper; (Finland) HJK; (Malta) Hamrun Spartans	(Iceland) Fram; Union Luxembourg; (England) Arsenal; (Republic of Ireland) Dundalk; (Bulgaria) Etar Veliko Tarnovo; (Germany) Hansa Rostock; (Northern Ireland) Portadown; (Poland) Zagłębie Lubin

Notes

1. ^{‡} Winners of the preliminary round, whose identity was not known at the time of draw.

== Summary ==
The first legs were played on 17 and 18 September, and the second legs on 2 October 1991.

Team 1	Agg.	Team 2	1st leg	2nd leg
Barcelona (Spain)	3–1	(Germany) Hansa Rostock	3–0	0–1
1. FC Kaiserslautern (Germany)	3–1	(Bulgaria) Etar Veliko Tarnovo	2–0	1–1
Union Luxembourg	0–10	(France) Marseille	0–5	0–5
Sparta Prague (Czechoslovakia)	2–2 (a)	(Scotland) Rangers	1–0	1–2 (a.e.t.)
Hamrun Spartans (Malta)	0–10	(Portugal) Benfica	0–6	0–4
Arsenal (England)	6–2	Austria Wien	6–1	0–1
HJK (Finland)	0–4	(Soviet Union) Dynamo Kyiv	0–1	0–3
Brøndby (Denmark)	4–2	(Poland) Zagłębie Lubin	3–0	1–2
Fram (Iceland)	2–2 (a)	(Greece) Panathinaikos	2–2	0–0
IFK Göteborg (Sweden)	1–1 (a)	(Albania) Flamurtari	0–0	1–1
Beşiktaş (Turkey)	2–3	(Netherlands) PSV Eindhoven	1–1	1–2
Anderlecht (Belgium)	4–1	(Switzerland) Grasshopper	1–1	3–0
Red Star Belgrade (Socialist Federal Republic of Yugoslavia)	8–0	(Northern Ireland) Portadown	4–0	4–0
Universitatea Craiova (Romania)	2–3	(Cyprus) Apollon Limassol	2–0	0–3
Kispest Honvéd (Hungary)	3–1	(Republic of Ireland) Dundalk	1–1	2–0
Sampdoria (Italy)	7–1	(Norway) Rosenborg	5–0	2–1

== Matches ==
18 September 1991
20:45

Barcelona (Spain)	3–0	(Germany) Hansa Rostock
Laudrup 25', 46'; Dowe 76' (o.g.)	Report

Estadi del Futbol Club Barcelona, Barcelona
Attendance: 78,000
Referee: Alphonse Constantin (Belgium)
2 October 1991
20:25

Hansa Rostock (Germany)	1–0	(Spain) Barcelona
Spies 64'	Report

Ostseestadion, Rostock
Attendance: 8,500
Referee: Pierluigi Pairetto (Italy)

Barcelona won 3–1 on aggregate.

17 September 1991
20:15

1. FC Kaiserslautern (Germany)	2–0	(Bulgaria) Etar Veliko Tarnovo
Funkel 38' (pen.), 74'	Report

Fritz-Walter-Stadion, Kaiserslautern
Attendance: 24,698
Referee: Fortunato Azevedo (Portugal)
2 October 1991
14:30

Etar Veliko Tarnovo (Bulgaria)	1–1	(Germany) 1. FC Kaiserslautern
Chervenkov 43'	Report	Degen 89'

Stadion Ivaylo, Veliko Tarnovo
Attendance: 6,492
Referee: Vadim Zhuk (Soviet Union)

1. FC Kaiserslautern won 3–1 on aggregate.

18 September 1991
20:30

Union Luxembourg	0–5	(France) Marseille
	Report	Papin 11', 32', 85' (pen.); Xuereb 15'; Sauzée 45'

Stade Josy Barthel, Luxembourg City
Attendance: 7,618
Referee: Michael Caulfield (Republic of Ireland)
2 October 1991
19:00

Marseille (France)	5–0	Union Luxembourg
Papin 15', 47'; Angloma 56'; Eyraud 60'; Xuereb 75'	Report

Stade Vélodrome, Marseille
Attendance: 15,500
Referee: Loizos Loizou (Cyprus)

Marseille won 10–0 on aggregate.

18 September 1991
17:00

Sparta Prague (Czechoslovakia)	1–0	(Scotland) Rangers
Němec 20'	Report

Stadion Letná, Prague
Attendance: 11,053
Referee: Hubert Forstinger (Austria)
2 October 1991
20:30

Rangers (Scotland)	2–1 (a.e.t.)	(Czechoslovakia) Sparta Prague
McCall 47', 93'	Report	Nisbet 98' (o.g.)

Ibrox Park, Glasgow
Attendance: 34,260
Referee: Mario van der Ende (Netherlands)

2–2 on aggregate; Sparta Prague won on away goals.

18 September 1991
16:45

Hamrun Spartans (Malta)	0–6	(Portugal) Benfica
	Report	Pacheco 30'; Yuran 32', 35', 50', 83'; Águas 75'

National Stadium, Ta' Qali
Attendance: 2,956
Referee: Alfred Wieser (Austria)
2 October 1991
22:00

Benfica (Portugal)	4–0	(Malta) Hamrun Spartans
Isaías 52'; César Brito 70'; Yuran 73'; Madeira 75'	Report

Estádio da Luz, Lisbon
Attendance: 12,500
Referee: Ernest Kesseler (Luxembourg)

Benfica won 10–0 on aggregate.

18 September 1991
21:05

Arsenal (England)	6–1	Austria Wien
Linighan 38'; Smith 50', 52', 65', 66'; Limpar 79'	Report	Ogris 56'

Arsenal Stadium, London
Attendance: 24,124
Referee: Rune Larsson (Sweden)
2 October 1991
19:30

Austria Wien	1–0	(England) Arsenal
Stöger 77' (pen.)	Report

Praterstadion, Vienna
Attendance: 11,000
Referee: Aleksey Spirin (Soviet Union)

Arsenal won 6–2 on aggregate.

18 September 1991
19:00

HJK (Finland)	0–1	(Soviet Union) Dynamo Kyiv
	Report	Kovalets 12'

Helsinki Olympic Stadium, Helsinki
Attendance: 3,032
Referee: Marek Kowalczyk (Poland)
2 October 1991
18:00

Dynamo Kyiv (Soviet Union)	3–0	(Finland) HJK
Kovalets 28'; Y. Moroz 48'; Hritsyna 72'	Report

Republican Stadium, Kyiv
Attendance: 4,300
Referee: Erman Toroğlu (Turkey)

Dynamo Kyiv won 4–0 on aggregate.

18 September 1991
19:00

Brøndby (Denmark)	3–0	(Poland) Zagłębie Lubin
Christofte 53' (pen.); Ekelund 58'; Okechukwu 73'	Report

Brøndby Stadion, Brøndbyvester
Attendance: 7,752
Referee: Wieland Ziller (Germany)
2 October 1991
13:00

Zagłębie Lubin (Poland)	2–1	(Denmark) Brøndby
Czachowski 60'; Grech 72'	Report	Vilfort 28'

Stadion Zagłębia Lubin, Lubin
Attendance: 3,423
Referee: Anders Frisk (Sweden)

Brøndby won 4–2 on aggregate.

18 September 1991
19:30

Fram (Iceland)	2–2	(Greece) Panathinaikos
Ragnarsson 58'; Arnþórsson 63'	Report	Christodoulou 37', 72'

Laugardalsvöllur, Reykjavík
Attendance: 561
Referee: Alan Snoddy (Northern Ireland)
2 October 1991
19:00

Panathinaikos (Greece)	0–0	(Iceland) Fram
	Report

O.A.K.A., Athens
Attendance: 45,765
Referee: Astrit Canaj (Albania)

2–2 on aggregate; Panathinaikos won on away goals.

18 September 1991
19:00

IFK Göteborg (Sweden)	0–0	(Albania) Flamurtari
	Report

Ullevi, Gothenburg
Attendance: 4,252
Referee: Bragi Bergmann (Iceland)
2 October 1991
14:30

Flamurtari (Albania)	1–1	(Sweden) IFK Göteborg
Vik. Daullja 26'	Report	Ekström 68'

Stadiumi Flamurtari, Vlorë
Attendance: 7,000
Referee: Angelo Amendolia (Italy)

1–1 on aggregate; IFK Göteborg won on away goals.

18 September 1991
17:30

Beşiktaş (Turkey)	1–1	(Netherlands) PSV Eindhoven
Özdilek 80' (pen.)	Report	Ellerman 27'

İnönü Stadium, Istanbul
Attendance: 24,967
Referee: Rosario Lo Bello (Italy)
2 October 1991
20:00

PSV Eindhoven (Netherlands)	2–1	(Turkey) Beşiktaş
Vanenburg 24'; Kalusha 58'	Report	Tekin 5'

Philips Stadion, Eindhoven
Attendance: 23,000
Referee: Wolf-Günter Wiesel (Germany)

PSV Eindhoven won 3–2 on aggregate.

18 September 1991
20:00

Anderlecht (Belgium)	1–1	(Switzerland) Grasshopper
Degryse 43'	Report	Nemtsoudis 66'

Constant Vanden Stock Stadium, Brussels
Attendance: 9,000
Referee: Jan Damgaard (Denmark)
2 October 1991
20:15

Grasshopper (Switzerland)	0–3	(Belgium) Anderlecht
	Report	Nilis 8', 24', 82'

Stadion Wankdorf, Bern
Attendance: 10,800
Referee: Neil Midgley (England)

Anderlecht won 4–1 on aggregate.

17 September 1991
20:00

Red Star Belgrade (Socialist Federal Republic of Yugoslavia)	4–0	(Northern Ireland) Portadown
Tanjga 15'; Stošić 37'; Mihajlović 77', 85'	Report

Felső Tisza-parti Stadion, Szeged, Hungary (Note: Match was played in Hungary since UEFA suspended Yugoslav teams from playing their home matches in Yugoslavia due to the deteriorating security situation in the country caused by the ethnic incidents that eventually turned into the Yugoslav Wars.)
Attendance: 3,000
Referee: Hasan Ceylan (Turkey)
2 October 1991
20:30

Portadown (Northern Ireland)	0–4	(Socialist Federal Republic of Yugoslavia) Red Star Belgrade
	Report	Ratković 19', 59'; Pančev 38'; Radinović 87'

Shamrock Park, Portadown
Attendance: 1,758
Referee: Tore Hollung (Norway)

Red Star Belgrade won 8–0 on aggregate.

18 September 1991
16:00

Universitatea Craiova (Romania)	2–0	(Cyprus) Apollon Limassol
Popescu 22' (pen.); Agalliu 68'	Report

Stadionul Central, Craiova
Attendance: 5,262
Referee: Viktor Filippov (Soviet Union)
2 October 1991
14:00

Apollon Limassol (Cyprus)	3–0	(Romania) Universitatea Craiova
Ptak 10' (pen.); Beširević 56', 79'	Report

Tsirio Stadium, Limassol
Attendance: 2,698
Referee: Dimitar Momirov (Bulgaria)

Apollon Limassol won 3–2 on aggregate.

18 September 1991
19:00

Kispest Honvéd (Hungary)	1–1	(Republic of Ireland) Dundalk
Negrău 83'	Report	McEvoy 30'

Bozsik József Stadion, Budapest
Attendance: 2,745
Referee: Zdravko Đokić (Yugoslavia)
2 October 1991
20:30

Dundalk (Republic of Ireland)	0–2	(Hungary) Kispest Honvéd
	Report	Pisont 24', 29'

Oriel Park, Dundalk
Attendance: 4,736
Referee: Roger Philippi (Luxembourg)

Kispest Honvéd won 3–1 on aggregate.

18 September 1991
20:30

Sampdoria (Italy)	5–0	(Norway) Rosenborg
Lombardo 12', 83'; Dossena 27', 57'; Silas 77'	Report

Stadio Luigi Ferraris, Genoa
Attendance: 23,120
Referee: Jim McCluskey (Scotland)
2 October 1991
19:00

Rosenborg (Norway)	1–2	(Italy) Sampdoria
Strand 83'	Report	Vialli 84'; Mancini 89' (pen.)

Lerkendal Stadion, Trondheim
Attendance: 6,705
Referee: Sándor Varga (Hungary)

Sampdoria won 7–1 on aggregate.
