= 1991–92 European Cup second round =

International football competition second round

The 1991–92 European Cup second round was the second stage of the 1991–92 European Cup competition, and featured the 16 teams that advanced from the first round. It began on 23 October with the first legs and ended on 6 November 1991 with the second legs. The eight winners advanced to the group stage.

Times are CET (UTC+1), as listed by UEFA.

== Teams ==
The 16 winners of the first round advanced to the second round.

Key to colours
Winners of second round advanced to group stage

Second round participants
Team	Coeff.
(Socialist Federal Republic of Yugoslavia) Red Star Belgrade	1.586
(France) Marseille	1.800
(Sweden) IFK Göteborg	1.636
(Italy) Sampdoria	1.625
(Portugal) Benfica	1.518
(Spain) Barcelona	1.447
(Belgium) Anderlecht	1.424
(Soviet Union) Dynamo Kyiv	1.363
(Denmark) Brøndby	1.250
(Netherlands) PSV Eindhoven	1.173
(Germany) 1. FC Kaiserslautern	1.000
(Hungary) Kispest Honvéd	1.000
(Greece) Panathinaikos	0.850
(Czechoslovakia) Sparta Prague	0.785
(Cyprus) Apollon Limassol	0.750
(England) Arsenal	0.000

Notes

1. ^{TH} Title holders

== Format ==
Each tie was played over two legs, with each team playing one leg at home. The team that scored more goals on aggregate over the two legs advanced to the next round. If the aggregate score was level, the away goals rule was applied, i.e. the team that scored more goals away from home over the two legs advanced. If away goals were also equal, then extra time was played. The away goals rule would be again applied after extra time, i.e. if there were goals scored during extra time and the aggregate score was still level, the visiting team advanced by virtue of more away goals scored. If no goals were scored during extra time, the tie was decided by penalty shoot-out.

== Seeding ==
The draw for the second round was held on 4 October 1991 in Geneva, Switzerland. The sixteen teams were divided into a seeded and unseeded pot, each containing eight teams, for the draw.

Seeded	Unseeded
(Socialist Federal Republic of Yugoslavia) Red Star Belgrade; (France) Marseille; (Sweden) IFK Göteborg; (Italy) Sampdoria; (Portugal) Benfica; (Spain) Barcelona; (Belgium) Anderlecht; (Soviet Union) Dynamo Kyiv	(Denmark) Brøndby; (Netherlands) PSV Eindhoven; (Germany) 1. FC Kaiserslautern; (Hungary) Kispest Honvéd; (Greece) Panathinaikos; (Czechoslovakia) Sparta Prague; (Cyprus) Apollon Limassol; (England) Arsenal

== Summary ==
The first legs were played on 23 October, and the second legs on 6 November 1991.

Team 1	Agg.	Team 2	1st leg	2nd leg
Barcelona (Spain)	3–3 (a)	(Germany) 1. FC Kaiserslautern	2–0	1–3
Marseille (France)	4–4 (a)	(Czechoslovakia) Sparta Prague	3–2	1–2
Benfica (Portugal)	4–2	(England) Arsenal	1–1	3–1 (a.e.t.)
Dynamo Kyiv (Soviet Union)	2–1	(Denmark) Brøndby	1–1	1–0
Panathinaikos (Greece)	4–2	(Sweden) IFK Göteborg	2–0	2–2
PSV Eindhoven (Netherlands)	0–2	(Belgium) Anderlecht	0–0	0–2
Red Star Belgrade (Socialist Federal Republic of Yugoslavia)	5–1	(Cyprus) Apollon Limassol	3–1	2–0
Kispest Honvéd (Hungary)	3–4	(Italy) Sampdoria	2–1	1–3

== Matches ==
23 October 1991
20:45

Barcelona (Spain)	2–0	(Germany) 1. FC Kaiserslautern
Begiristain 43', 52'	Report

Estadi del Futbol Club Barcelona, Barcelona
Attendance: 65,000
Referee: Gérard Biguet (France)
6 November 1991
20:00

1. FC Kaiserslautern (Germany)	3–1	(Spain) Barcelona
Hotić 35', 49'; Goldbæk 76'	Report	Bakero 90'

Fritz-Walter-Stadion, Kaiserslautern
Attendance: 30,200
Referee: Erik Fredriksson (Sweden)

3–3 on aggregate; Barcelona won on away goals.

23 October 1991
20:30

Marseille (France)	3–2	(Czechoslovakia) Sparta Prague
Waddle 33'; Papin 56', 59'	Report	Vrabec 63' (pen.); Kukleta 78' (pen.)

Stade Vélodrome, Marseille
Attendance: 31,750
Referee: Gerhard Kapl (Austria)
6 November 1991
18:00

Sparta Prague (Czechoslovakia)	2–1	(France) Marseille
Frýdek 38'; Siegl 69'	Report	Pele 86'

Stadion Letná, Prague
Attendance: 10,016
Referee: Allan Gunn (England)

4–4 on aggregate; Sparta Prague won on away goals.

23 October 1991
22:00

Benfica (Portugal)	1–1	(England) Arsenal
Isaías 15'	Report	Campbell 17'

Estádio da Luz, Lisbon
Attendance: 40,000
Referee: Tullio Lanese (Italy)
6 November 1991
21:05

Arsenal (England)	1–3 (a.e.t.)	(Portugal) Benfica
Pates 20'	Report	Isaías 36', 107'; Kulkov 100'

Arsenal Stadium, London
Attendance: 35,815
Referee: Aron Schmidhuber (Germany)

Benfica won 4–2 on aggregate.

23 October 1991
18:00

Dynamo Kyiv (Soviet Union)	1–1	(Denmark) Brøndby
Salenko 77' (pen.)	Report	C. Nielsen 12'

Republican Stadium, Kyiv
Attendance: 29,184
Referee: John Blankenstein (Netherlands)
6 November 1991
19:00

Brøndby (Denmark)	0–1	(Soviet Union) Dynamo Kyiv
	Report	Yakovenko 7'

Brøndby Stadion, Brøndbyvester
Attendance: 13,712
Referee: Leslie Irvine (Northern Ireland)

Dynamo Kyiv won 2–1 on aggregate.

23 October 1991
18:30

Panathinaikos (Greece)	2–0	(Sweden) IFK Göteborg
Saravakos 27'; Marangos 49'	Report

O.A.K.A., Athens
Attendance: 55,454
Referee: Neil Midgley (England)
6 November 1991
19:00

IFK Göteborg (Sweden)	2–2	(Greece) Panathinaikos
Svensson 23'; Ekström 38'	Report	Saravakos 60', 83' (pen.)

Ullevi, Gothenburg
Attendance: 10,684
Referee: Ryszard Wójcik (Poland)

Panathinaikos won 4–2 on aggregate.

23 October 1991
20:00

PSV Eindhoven (Netherlands)	0–0	(Belgium) Anderlecht
	Report

Philips Stadion, Eindhoven
Attendance: 24,500
Referee: Hubert Forstinger (Austria)
6 November 1991
20:00

Anderlecht (Belgium)	2–0	(Netherlands) PSV Eindhoven
Degryse 11'; Boffin 87'	Report

Constant Vanden Stock Stadium, Brussels
Attendance: 26,000
Referee: Bruno Galler (Switzerland)

Anderlecht won 2–0 on aggregate.

23 October 1991
18:00

Red Star Belgrade (Socialist Federal Republic of Yugoslavia)	3–1	(Cyprus) Apollon Limassol
Pančev 15'; Lukić 71'; Savićević 83' (pen.)	Report	Ptak 41'

Felső Tisza-parti Stadion, Szeged, Hungary (Note: Match was played in Hungary since UEFA suspended Yugoslav teams from playing their home matches in Yugoslavia due to the deteriorating security situation in the country caused by the ethnic incidents that eventually turned into the Yugoslav Wars.)
Attendance: 800
Referee: Vadim Zhuk (Soviet Union)
6 November 1991
18:05

Apollon Limassol (Cyprus)	0–2	(Socialist Federal Republic of Yugoslavia) Red Star Belgrade
	Report	Savićević 47'; Lukić 75' (pen.)

Tsirio Stadium, Limassol
Attendance: 3,180
Referee: Heinz Holzmann (Austria)

Red Star Belgrade won 5–1 on aggregate.

23 October 1991
20:00

Kispest Honvéd (Hungary)	2–1	(Italy) Sampdoria
Pisont 54'; Cservenkai 72'	Report	Toninho Cerezo 58'

Bozsik József Stadion, Budapest
Attendance: 6,362
Referee: Jaap Uilenberg (Netherlands)
6 November 1991
20:30

Sampdoria (Italy)	3–1	(Hungary) Kispest Honvéd
Lombardo 9'; Vialli 26', 46'	Report	Pari 65' (o.g.)

Stadio Luigi Ferraris, Genoa
Attendance: 26,537
Referee: Rune Larsson (Sweden)

Sampdoria won 4–3 on aggregate.
