= 1991–92 UC Sampdoria season =

Sampdoria
1991–92 season
- Chairman: Enrico Mantovani
- Manager: Vujadin Boškov
- Stadium: Stadio Luigi Ferraris
- Serie A: 7th
- European Cup: Runners-up
- Coppa Italia: Semi-finals
- Top goalscorer: League: Gianluca Vialli (11); All: Gianluca Vialli (20)
Home colours	Away colours	Third colours

The 1991–92 season saw Sampdoria compete in this season's editions of the Serie A, Coppa Italia, and European Cup. The club reached the 1992 European Cup final only to suffer a 1–0 loss in extra time to Barcelona.

In the league, Sampdoria finished tied for sixth with Parma. Due to Sampdoria's failure to secure European football, championship-winning coach Vujadin Boškov left his job.

== Squad ==
Note: Flags indicate national team as defined under FIFA eligibility rules; some limited exceptions apply. Players may hold more than one non-FIFA nationality.

Pos.	Nation	Player
GK	ITA	Gianluca Pagliuca
GK	ITA	Giulio Nuciari
DF	ITA	Dario Bonetti
DF	ITA	Marco Lanna
DF	ITA	Pietro Vierchowod
DF	ITA	Moreno Mannini
DF	ITA	Alessandro Orlando
DF	ITA	Michele Zanutta
MF	ITA	Ivano Bonetti

Pos.	Nation	Player
MF	BRA	Toninho Cerezo
MF	ITA	Giovanni Invernizzi
MF	SLO	Srečko Katanec
MF	ITA	Attilio Lombardo
MF	ITA	Fausto Pari
MF	BRA	Paulo Silas
FW	ITA	Renato Buso
FW	ITA	Roberto Mancini
FW	ITA	Gianluca Vialli

=== Transfers ===
In
Pos.	Name	from	Type
MF	Paulo Silas	AC Cesena	
DF	Alessandro Orlando	Udinese Calcio	
DF	Dario Bonetti	Juventus	
FW	Renato Buso	Fiorentina	

Out
Pos.	Name	To	Type
DF	Luca Pellegrini	Hellas Verona	
DF	Michele Mignani	SPAL	
MF	Alexei Mikhailichenko	Glasgow Rangers	
FW	Marco Branca	Fiorentina	

==== Winter ====
Out
Pos.	Name	To	Type
MF	Giuseppe Dossena	Perugia Calcio	

== Competitions ==
=== Supercoppa Italiana ===
24 August 1991	Sampdoria	1–0	Roma	Genoa
20:30	Mancini 75'			Stadium: Stadio Luigi Ferraris; Attendance: 21,120; Referee: Tullio Lanesi

=== Serie A ===
==== League table ====
Pos	Team	Pld	W	D	L	GF	GA	GD	Pts	Qualification or relegation
4	Napoli	34	15	12	7	56	40	+16	42	Qualification to UEFA Cup
5	Roma	34	13	14	7	37	31	+6	40	Qualification to UEFA Cup
6	Sampdoria	34	11	16	7	38	31	+7	38	
7	Parma	34	11	16	7	32	28	+4	38	Qualification to Cup Winners' Cup
8	Internazionale	34	10	17	7	28	28	0	37	

Source: 1991–92 Serie A, RSSSF.com
Rules for classification: 1) Points; 2) Head-to-head points; 3) Head-to-head goal difference; 4) Goal difference; 5) Goals scored; 6) Draw.

==== Results summary ====
Overall								Home						Away					
Pld	W	D	L	GF	GA	GD	Pts	W	D	L	GF	GA	GD	W	D	L	GF	GA	GD
34	11	16	7	38	31	+7	49	7	8	2	25	13	+12	4	8	5	13	18	−5

Source: Worldfootball

==== Results by round ====
Round	1	2	3	4	5	6	7	8	9	10	11	12	13	14	15	16	17	18	19	20	21	22	23	24	25	26	27	28	29	30	31	32	33	34
Ground	A	H	A	H	H	A	H	A	A	H	A	H	A	H	A	H	A	H	A	H	A	A	H	A	H	H	A	H	A	H	A	H	A	H
Result	L	W	D	W	W	L	L	D	L	L	L	D	D	W	W	W	W	D	D	D	D	W	W	D	D	D	L	D	D	D	D	W	W	D
Position	13	7	9	4	2	8	11	11	13	13	13	14	13	13	12	12	8	8	8	9	8	7	6	6	6	5	7	7	7	6	8	6	6	6

Source: http://calcio-seriea.net/allenatori_squadra/1991/1021/
A = Away; H = Home; W = Win; D = Draw; L = Loss; = 1992–93 European Cup; = 1992–93 UEFA Cup

==== Matches ====
1 September 1991 1	Cagliari	3–2	Sampdoria	Cagliari
	Francescoli 14' (pen.), 50'; Herrera 67'	Report	Silas 11'; Mancini 15'	Stadium: Stadio Sant'Elia; Attendance: 22,538; Referee: Gianni Beschin

8 September 1991 2	Sampdoria	2–0	Hellas Verona	Genoa
	Cerezo 11'; Vialli 66'	Report		Stadium: Stadio Luigi Ferraris; Attendance: 28,900; Referee: Alfredo Trentalange

15 September 1991 3	Bari	1–1	Sampdoria	Bari
	Platt 76'	Report	Vialli 7'	Stadium: Stadio San Nicola; Attendance: 40,000; Referee: Carlo Sguizzato

22 September 1991 4	Sampdoria	4–0	Internazionale	Genoa
	Mancini 34'; Lombardo 57', 85'; Vialli 65'	Report		Stadium: Stadio Luigi Ferraris; Attendance: 37,540; Referee: Angelo Amendolia

29 September 1991 5	Sampdoria	4–0	Ascoli	Genoa
	Lombardo 12'; Vialli 30' (pen.), 40'; Mancini 32'	Report		Stadium: Stadio Luigi Ferraris; Attendance: 27,093; Referee: Robert Boggi

6 October 1991 6	Parma	2–1	Sampdoria	Parma
	Minotti 13'; Grün 59'	Report	Vialli 57' (pen.)	Stadium: Stadio Ennio Tardini; Attendance: 23,195; Referee: Tullio Lanese

20 October 1991 7	Sampdoria	0–2	Atalanta	Genoa
		Report	Bianchezi 52'; Caniggia 67'	Stadium: Stadio Luigi Ferraris; Attendance: 38,700; Referee: Vincenzo Fucci

27 October 1991 8	Genoa	0–0	Sampdoria	Genoa
		Report		Stadium: Stadio Luigi Ferraris; Attendance: 39,799; Referee: Pietro D'Elia

3 November 1991 9	Napoli	2–1	Sampdoria	Naples
	Gianfranco Zola 3'; Careca 38' (pen.)	Report	Laurent Blanc 40' (o.g.)	Stadium: Stadio San Paolo; Attendance: 55,000; Referee: Luciano Luci

17 November 1991 10	Sampdoria	0–2	Milan	Genoa
		Report	Gullit 65', 70'	Stadium: Stadio Luigi Ferraris; Attendance: 37,877; Referee: Tullio Lanese

24 November 1991 11	Roma	2–0	Sampdoria	Rome
	Rizzitelli 47'; Giannini 77'	Report		Stadium: Stadio Olimpico; Attendance: 50,670; Referee: Arcangelo Pezzella

1 December 1991 12	Sampdoria	0–0	Torino	Genoa
		Report		Stadium: Stadio Luigi Ferraris; Attendance: 29,274; Referee: Paolo Fabricatore

8 December 1991 13	Foggia	0–0	Sampdoria	Foggia
		Report		Stadium: Stadio Pino Zaccheria; Attendance: 20,300; Referee: Walter Cinciripini

15 December 1991 14	Sampdoria	1–0	Juventus	Genoa
	Katanec 23'	Report		Stadium: Stadio Luigi Ferraris; Attendance: 37,808; Referee: Loris Stafoggia

5 January 1992 15	Fiorentina	1–2	Sampdoria	Florence
	Pari 77' (o.g.)	Report	Vierchowod 39'; Vialli 71'	Stadium: Artemio Franchi Stadium; Attendance: 31,563; Referee: Mauro Felicani

12 January 1992 16	Sampdoria	1–0	Lazio	Genoa
	Vialli 6'	Report		Stadium: Stadio Luigi Ferraris; Attendance: 29,823; Referee: Fabio Baldas

19 January 1992 17	Cremonese	0–1	Sampdoria	Cremona
		Report	Lombardo 7'	Stadium: Giovanni Zini; Attendance: 9,216; Referee: Arcangelo Pezzella

26 January 1992 18	Sampdoria	1–1	Cagliari	Genoa
	Katanec 55'	Report	Napoli 22'	Stadium: Stadio Luigi Ferraris; Attendance: 29,319; Referee: Marcello Nicchi

2 February 1992 19	Hellas Verona	0–0	Sampdoria	Verona
		Report		Stadium: Stadio Marcantonio Bentegodi; Attendance: 23,000; Referee: Angelo Amendolia

9 February 1992 20	Sampdoria	1–1	Bari	Genoa
	Mancini 21' (pen.)	Report	Soda 4'	Stadium: Stadio Luigi Ferraris; Attendance: 27,000; Referee: Virginio Quartuccio

16 February 1992 21	Internazionale	0–0	Sampdoria	Milan
		Report		Stadium: San Siro; Attendance: 34,673; Referee: Alfredo Trentalange

23 February 1992 22	Ascoli	0–1	Sampdoria	Ascoli
		Report	Silas 45'	Stadium: Cino e Lillo Del Duca; Attendance: 9,175; Referee: Giovanni Merlino

1 March 1992 23	Sampdoria	2–0	Parma	Genoa
	Orlando 67'; Mancini 90'	Report		Stadium: Stadio Luigi Ferraris; Attendance: 30,752; Referee: Pierluigi Collina

8 March 1992 24	Atalanta	0–0	Sampdoria	Bergamo
		Report		Stadium: Atleti Azzurri d'Italia; Attendance: 22,400; Referee: Paolo Fabricatore

15 March 1992 25	Sampdoria	2–2	Genoa	Genoa
	Katanec 15'; Mancini 41'	Report	Signorini 3'; Bortolazzi 18'	Stadium: Stadio Luigi Ferraris; Attendance: 38,000; Referee: Alfredo Trentalange

29 March 1992 26	Sampdoria	1–1	Napoli	Genoa
	Lanna 59'	Report	Padovano 47'	Stadium: Stadio Luigi Ferraris; Attendance: 30,000; Referee: Mauro Felicani

5 April 1992 27	Milan	5–1	Sampdoria	Milan
	Rijkaard 34'; Evani 54' van Basten 62'; Massaro 82'; Albertini 86'	Report	Vialli 84'	Stadium: San Siro; Attendance: 73,965; Referee: Maurizio Mughetti

12 April 1992 28	Sampdoria	1–1	Roma	Genoa
	Silas 90'	Report	Giannini 89'	Stadium: Stadio Luigi Ferraris; Attendance: 27,121; Referee: Piero Ceccarini

18 April 1992 29	Torino	1–1	Sampdoria	Turin
	Casagrande 17'	Report	Katanec 39'	Stadium: Stadio delle Alpi; Attendance: 38,830; Referee: Pietro D'Elia

26 April 1992 30	Sampdoria	1–1	Foggia	Genoa
	Vialli 69'	Report	Rambaudi 23'	Stadium: Stadio Luigi Ferraris; Attendance: 28,130; Referee: Livio Bazzoli

3 May 1992 31	Juventus	0–0	Sampdoria	Turin
		Report		Stadium: Stadio delle Alpi; Attendance: 44,131; Referee: Walter Cinciripini

10 May 1992 32	Sampdoria	2–0	Fiorentina	Genoa
	Buso 41'; Pari 58'	Report		Stadium: Stadio Luigi Ferraris; Attendance: 27,896; Referee: Carlo Sguizzato

17 May 1992 33	Lazio	1–2	Sampdoria	Rome
	Doll 13'	Report	Buso 32', 76'	Stadium: Stadio Olimpico; Attendance: 30,000; Referee: Luciano Luci

24 May 1992 34	Sampdoria	2–2	Cremonese	Genoa
	Vialli 51'; Pari 72' (pen.)	Report	Gualco 24'; Marcolin 73' (pen.)	Stadium: Stadio Luigi Ferraris; Attendance: 28,500; Referee: Roberto Bettin

=== Coppa Italia ===
==== Second round ====
28 August 1991 First leg	Sampdoria	3–1	Modena	Genoa
	Buso 35'; Mancini 52' (pen.), 66'		Dionigi 48'	Stadium: Stadio Luigi Ferraris; Referee: Walter Cinciripini

4 September 1991 Second leg	Modena	0–3 (1–6 agg.)	Sampdoria	Modena
			Silas 34'; Pari 43', 53'	Stadium: Stadio Alberto Braglia; Referee: Pierluigi Pairetto

==== Round of 16 ====
30 October 1991 First leg	Sampdoria	1–1	Bari	Genoa
	Vialli 65' (pen.)		Platt 45'	Stadium: Stadio Luigi Ferraris; Referee: Piero Ceccarini

4 December 1991 Second leg	Bari	2–2 (3–3a agg.)	Sampdoria	Bari
	Platt 62' (pen.); Soda 102'		Vialli 80' (pen.); Cerezo 118'	Stadium: Stadio San Nicola; Referee: Fabio Baldas

==== Quarter-finals ====
12 February 1992 First leg	Sampdoria	1–0	Roma	Genoa
	Vialli 89'			Stadium: Stadio Luigi Ferraris; Referee: Carlo Sguizzato

26 February 1992 Second leg	Roma	1–1 (1–2 agg.)	Sampdoria	Rome
	Carnevale 23'		Vierchowod 74'	Stadium: Stadio Olimpico; Referee: Pierluigi Pairetto

==== Semi-finals ====
21 March 1992 First leg	Parma	1–0	Sampdoria	Parma
	Brolin 50'			Stadium: Stadio Ennio Tardini; Referee: Gianni Beschin

30 April 1992 Second leg	Sampdoria	2–2 (a.e.t.) (2–3 agg.)	Parma	Genoa
	Pari 77'; Vierchowod 120'		Melli 97', 103'	Stadium: Stadio Luigi Ferraris; Referee: Angelo Amendolia

=== European Cup ===
==== First round ====
18 September 1991 First leg	Sampdoria (Italy)	5–0	(Norway) Rosenborg	Genoa, Italy
20:30	Lombardo 11', 84'; Dossena 26', 57'; Silas 76'	Report		Stadium: Stadio Luigi Ferraris; Attendance: 23,120; Referee: Jim McCluskey (Scotland)

2 October 1991 Second leg	Rosenborg (Norway)	1–2 (1–7 agg.)	(Italy) Sampdoria	Trondheim, Norway
19:00	Strand 83'	Report	Vialli 85'; Mancini 90' (pen.)	Stadium: Lerkendal Stadion; Attendance: 6,705; Referee: Sándor Varga (Hungary)

==== Second round ====
23 October 1991 First leg	Budapest Honvéd (Hungary)	2–1	(Italy) Sampdoria	Budapest, Hungary
20:00	Pisont 52'; Cservenkai 72'	Report	Cerezo 56'	Stadium: Bozsik Stadion; Attendance: 6,362; Referee: Jaap Uilenberg (Netherlands)

6 November 1991 Second leg	Sampdoria (Italy)	3–1 (4–3 agg.)	(Hungary) Budapest Honvéd	Genoa, Italy
20:30	Lombardo 10'; Vialli 27', 46'	Report	Pari 65' (o.g.)	Stadium: Stadio Luigi Ferraris; Attendance: 26,537; Referee: Rune Larsson (Sweden)

==== Group stage ====
Pos	Team	Pld	W	D	L	GF	GA	GD	Pts	Qualification	SAM	RSB	AND	PAN
1	(Italy) Sampdoria	6	3	2	1	10	5	+5	8	Advance to final	—	2–0	2–0	1–1
2	(Socialist Federal Republic of Yugoslavia) Red Star Belgrade	6	3	0	3	9	10	−1	6		1–3	—	3–2	1–0
3	(Belgium) Anderlecht	6	2	2	2	8	9	−1	6		3–2	3–2	—	0–0
4	(Greece) Panathinaikos	6	0	4	2	1	4	−3	4		0–0	0–2	0–0	—

Source: UEFA

27 November 1991 1	Sampdoria (Italy)	2–0	(Socialist Federal Republic of Yugoslavia) Red Star Belgrade	Genoa, Italy
20:30	Nedeljković 7' (o.g.); Vialli 74'	Report		Stadium: Stadio Luigi Ferraris; Attendance: 29,981; Referee: Gérard Biguet (France)

11 December 1991 2	Panathinaikos (Greece)	0–0	(Italy) Sampdoria	Athens, Greece
20:00		Report		Stadium: Olympic Stadium; Attendance: 53,841; Referee: Hubert Forstinger (Austria)

4 March 1992 3	Anderlecht (Belgium)	3–2	(Italy) Sampdoria	Brussels, Belgium
	Degryse 53'; Nilis 66', 88'	Report	Vialli 26', 63'	Stadium: Constant Vanden Stock Stadium; Attendance: 24,000; Referee: Aron Schmidhuber (Germany)

18 March 1992 4	Sampdoria (Italy)	2–0	(Belgium) Anderlecht	Genoa, Italy
20:30	Lombardo 33'; Mancini 35'	Report		Stadium: Stadio Luigi Ferraris; Attendance: 33,874; Referee: Peter Mikkelsen (Denmark)

1 April 1992 5	Red Star Belgrade (Socialist Federal Republic of Yugoslavia)	1–3	(Italy) Sampdoria	Sofia, Bulgaria
20:15	Mihajlović 19'	Report	Katanec 34'; Vasilijević 41' (o.g.); Mancini 76'	Stadium: Balgarska Armiya Stadium; Attendance: 35,000; Referee: dos Santos (Portugal)

15 April 1992 6	Sampdoria (Italy)	1–1	(Greece) Panathinaikos	Genoa, Italy
20:15	Mancini 36'	Report	Marangos 27'	Stadium: Stadio Luigi Ferraris; Attendance: 39,000; Referee: Kurt Röthlisberger (Switzerland)

==== Final ====
20 May 1992	Sampdoria (Italy)	0–1	(Spain) Barcelona	London, London
19:15	Mannini (yellow card) 39'; Vierchowod (yellow card) 66'; Mancini (yellow card) 118'	Report	Bakero (yellow card) 75'; Koeman 112'	Stadium: Wembley Stadium; Attendance: 70,827; Referee: Aron Schmidhuber (Germany)

== Statistics ==
=== Players statistics ===
No.	Pos	Nat	Player	Total		Serie A		European Cup		Coppa Italia	
No.	Pos	Nat	Player	Apps	Goals	Apps	Goals	Apps	Goals	Apps	Goals
	GK	(Italy) ITA	Pagliuca	45	-41	34	-31	11	-10		
	DF	(Italy) ITA	Mannini	38	0	27+1	0	10	0		
	DF	(Italy) ITA	Lanna	42	1	30+1	1	9+2	0		
	DF	(Italy) ITA	Vierchowod	40	1	31	1	9	0		
	DF	(Slovenia) SLO	Katanec	36	5	26	4	10	1		
	MF	(Italy) ITA	Lombardo	44	8	33+1	4	9+1	4		
	MF	(Italy) ITA	Pari	43	2	32	2	11	0		
	MF	(Brazil) BRA	Toninho Cerezo	37	2	23+4	1	10	1		
	MF	(Italy) ITA	I. Bonetti	29	0	23	0	6	0		
	FW	(Italy) ITA	Vialli	42	17	30+1	11	10+1	6		
	FW	(Italy) ITA	Mancini	38	10	27+2	6	9	4		
	GK	(Italy) ITA	Nuciari	0	0	0	0				
	MF	(Brazil) BRA	Paulo Silas	35	4	16+15	3	4	1		
	MF	(Italy) ITA	Invernizzi	34	0	12+14	0	1+7	0		
	DF	(Italy) ITA	Bonetti	17	0	10+4	0	3	0		
	DF	(Italy) ITA	Orlando	19	1	10+4	1	5	0		
	FW	(Italy) ITA	Buso	26	3	9+10	3	3+4	0		
	MF	(Italy) ITA	Dossena	7	2	1+5	0	1	2		
	DF	(Italy) ITA	Zanutta	0	0	0	0				

== Sources ==
- RSSSF - Italy 1991/92
