= 1991–92 European Cup group stage =

International football competition group stage

Location of teams of the 1991–92 European Cup group stage.
Blue: Group A; Red: Group B.

The 1991–92 European Cup group stage began on 27 November 1991 and ended on 15 April 1992. A total of eight teams competed in the group stage to decide the two finalists of the 1991–92 European Cup. This was the first use of a group stage in the history of the competition, where this phase in the next two editions became known as the UEFA Champions League before ultimately becoming the name for the entire tournament.

== Format ==
In each group, teams played against each other home-and-away in a double round-robin format. The winner of each group then faced each other in the final.

== Teams and draw ==
The eight winners of the second round advanced to the group stage. The draw for the group stage was held on 8 November 1991 in Geneva, Switzerland. The eight teams were drawn into two groups of four. The draw was open, with no seedings or pots used.

Key to colours
Group winners advanced to final

Group stage participants
Team	Notes	Coeff.
(Socialist Federal Republic of Yugoslavia) Red Star Belgrade		1.586
(Italy) Sampdoria		1.625
(Portugal) Benfica		1.518
(Spain) Barcelona		1.447
(Belgium) Anderlecht		1.424
(Soviet Union) Dynamo Kyiv		1.363
(Greece) Panathinaikos		0.850
(Czechoslovakia) Sparta Prague		0.785

Notes

1. ^{TH} European Cup title holders

== Groups ==
Times are CET/CEST, (Note: CET (UTC+1) for dates up to 18 March 1992 (matchdays 1–4), and CEST (UTC+2) for dates thereafter (matchdays 5–6).) as listed by UEFA.

=== Group A ===
Pos	Team	Pld	W	D	L	GF	GA	GD	Pts	Qualification	SAM	RSB	AND	PAN
1	(Italy) Sampdoria	6	3	2	1	10	5	+5	8	Advance to final	—	2–0	2–0	1–1
2	(Socialist Federal Republic of Yugoslavia) Red Star Belgrade	6	3	0	3	9	10	−1	6		1–3	—	3–2	1–0
3	(Belgium) Anderlecht	6	2	2	2	8	9	−1	6		3–2	3–2	—	0–0
4	(Greece) Panathinaikos	6	0	4	2	1	4	−3	4		0–0	0–2	0–0	—

Source: UEFA
27 November 1991
20:15

Anderlecht (Belgium)	0–0	(Greece) Panathinaikos
	Report

Constant Vanden Stock Stadium, Brussels
Attendance: 16,500
Referee: Brian McGinlay (Scotland)
27 November 1991
20:30

Sampdoria (Italy)	2–0	(Socialist Federal Republic of Yugoslavia) Red Star Belgrade
Nedeljković 7' (o.g.); Vialli 73'	Report

Stadio Luigi Ferraris, Genoa
Attendance: 29,981
Referee: Gérard Biguet (France)

11 December 1991
19:00

Panathinaikos (Greece)	0–0	(Italy) Sampdoria
	Report

O.A.K.A., Athens
Attendance: 53,841
Referee: Hubert Forstinger (Austria)
12 December 1991
20:15

Red Star Belgrade (Socialist Federal Republic of Yugoslavia)	3–2	(Belgium) Anderlecht
Ratković 19'; Ivić 68'; Pančev 87'	Report	Lamptey 33'; Nilis 60'

Bozsik József Stadion, Budapest, Hungary (Note: Match was played in Hungary since UEFA suspended Yugoslav teams from playing their home matches in Yugoslavia due to the deteriorating security situation in the country caused by the ethnic incidents that eventually turned into the Yugoslav Wars.)
Attendance: 2,000
Referee: Leif Sundell (Sweden)

4 March 1992
19:00

Panathinaikos (Greece)	0–2	(Socialist Federal Republic of Yugoslavia) Red Star Belgrade
	Report	Pančev 70', 86'

O.A.K.A., Athens
Attendance: 55,311
Referee: Alexey Spirin (CIS)
4 March 1992
20:15

Anderlecht (Belgium)	3–2	(Italy) Sampdoria
Degryse 54'; Nilis 69', 90'	Report	Vialli 27', 63'

Constant Vanden Stock Stadium, Brussels
Attendance: 24,000
Referee: Aron Schmidhuber (Germany)

18 March 1992
20:15

Red Star Belgrade (Socialist Federal Republic of Yugoslavia)	1–0	(Greece) Panathinaikos
Mihajlović 53' (pen.)	Report

Stadion Balgarska Armia, Sofia, Bulgaria (Note: Match was played in Bulgaria since UEFA suspended Yugoslav teams from playing their home matches in Yugoslavia due to the deteriorating security situation in the country caused by the ethnic incidents that eventually turned into the Yugoslav Wars.)
Attendance: 23,000
Referee: Emilio Soriano Aladrén (Spain)
18 March 1992
20:30

Sampdoria (Italy)	2–0	(Belgium) Anderlecht
Lombardo 35'; Mancini 37'	Report

Stadio Luigi Ferraris, Genoa
Attendance: 33,874
Referee: Peter Mikkelsen (Denmark)

1 April 1992
19:30

Panathinaikos (Greece)	0–0	(Belgium) Anderlecht
	Report

O.A.K.A., Athens
Attendance: 40,000
Referee: Joe Worrall (England)
1 April 1992
20:15

Red Star Belgrade (Socialist Federal Republic of Yugoslavia)	1–3	(Italy) Sampdoria
Mihajlović 19'	Report	Katanec 34'; Vasilijević 41' (o.g.); Mancini 76'

Stadion Balgarska Armia, Sofia, Bulgaria
Attendance: 35,000
Referee: José Rosa dos Santos (Portugal)

15 April 1992
20:15

Anderlecht (Belgium)	3–2	(Socialist Federal Republic of Yugoslavia) Red Star Belgrade
Oliveira 3'; Bosman 44'; Degryse 82'	Report	Pančev 7'; Čula 80'

Constant Vanden Stock Stadium, Brussels
Attendance: 8,000
Referee: Joël Quiniou (France)
15 April 1992
20:15

Sampdoria (Italy)	1–1	(Greece) Panathinaikos
Mancini 36'	Report	Marangos 27'

Stadio Luigi Ferraris, Genoa
Attendance: 39,000
Referee: Kurt Röthlisberger (Switzerland)

=== Group B ===
Pos	Team	Pld	W	D	L	GF	GA	GD	Pts	Qualification	BAR	SPP	BEN	DKV
1	(Spain) Barcelona	6	4	1	1	10	4	+6	9	Advance to final	—	3–2	2–1	3–0
2	(Czechoslovakia) Sparta Prague	6	2	2	2	7	7	0	6		1–0	—	1–1	2–1
3	(Portugal) Benfica	6	1	3	2	8	5	+3	5		0–0	1–1	—	5–0
4	(Commonwealth of Independent States) Dynamo Kyiv	6	2	0	4	3	12	−9	4		0–2	1–0	1–0	—

Source: UEFA
27 November 1991
18:00

Dynamo Kyiv (Soviet Union)	1–0	(Portugal) Benfica
Salenko 30'	Report

Republican Stadium, Kyiv
Attendance: 41,500
Referee: Keith Hackett (England)
27 November 1991
20:45

Barcelona (Spain)	3–2	(Czechoslovakia) Sparta Prague
Amor 15'; Laudrup 33'; Bakero 61'	Report	Vrabec 18'; Němeček 64'

Estadi del Futbol Club Barcelona, Barcelona
Attendance: 82,000
Referee: Kim Milton Nielsen (Denmark)

11 December 1991
18:00

Sparta Prague (Czechoslovakia)	2–1	(Soviet Union) Dynamo Kyiv
Němeček 13'; Vrabec 22'	Report	Sharan 55'

Stadion Letná, Prague
Attendance: 14,639
Referee: Rosario Lo Bello (Italy)
11 December 1991
22:00

Benfica (Portugal)	0–0	(Spain) Barcelona
	Report

Estádio da Luz, Lisbon
Attendance: 65,000
Referee: Bruno Galler (Switzerland)

4 March 1992
19:00

Dynamo Kyiv (Commonwealth of Independent States)	0–2	(Spain) Barcelona
	Report	Stoichkov 32'; Salinas 68'

Republican Stadium, Kyiv
Attendance: 48,500
Referee: Guy Goethals (Belgium)
4 March 1992
22:00

Benfica (Portugal)	1–1	(Czechoslovakia) Sparta Prague
Pacheco 53' (pen.)	Report	Novotný 32'

Estádio da Luz, Lisbon
Attendance: 50,000
Referee: Howard King (Wales)

18 March 1992
18:00

Sparta Prague (Czechoslovakia)	1–1	(Portugal) Benfica
Chovanec 45'	Report	Vítor Paneira 30'

Stadion Letná, Prague
Attendance: 28,000
Referee: Gérard Biguet (France)
18 March 1992
20:45

Barcelona (Spain)	3–0	(Commonwealth of Independent States) Dynamo Kyiv
Stoichkov 59', 83'; Salinas 87'	Report

Estadi del Futbol Club Barcelona, Barcelona
Attendance: 70,000
Referee: Karl-Josef Assenmacher (Germany)

1 April 1992
18:00

Sparta Prague (Czechoslovakia)	1–0	(Spain) Barcelona
Siegl 66'	Report

Stadion Letná, Prague
Attendance: 27,374
Referee: Bo Karlsson (Sweden)
1 April 1992
22:00

Benfica (Portugal)	5–0	(Commonwealth of Independent States) Dynamo Kyiv
César Brito 25', 62'; Isaías 71'; Yuran 83', 87'	Report

Estádio da Luz, Lisbon
Attendance: 10,000
Referee: Mario van der Ende (Netherlands)

15 April 1992
20:00

Dynamo Kyiv (Commonwealth of Independent States)	1–0	(Czechoslovakia) Sparta Prague
Salenko 83'	Report

Republican Stadium, Kyiv
Attendance: 5,000
Referee: Brian McGinlay (Scotland)
15 April 1992
20:00

Barcelona (Spain)	2–1	(Portugal) Benfica
Stoichkov 12'; Bakero 24'	Report	César Brito 28'

Estadi del Futbol Club Barcelona, Barcelona
Attendance: 115,000
Referee: Hubert Forstinger (Austria)
