= 1991–92 Arsenal F.C. season =

English football club season

Arsenal
1991–92 season
- Chairman: Peter Hill-Wood
- Manager: George Graham
- Stadium: Highbury
- First Division: 4th
- FA Cup: Third round
- League Cup: Third round
- Charity Shield: Winners (Shared)
- European Cup: Second round
- Top goalscorer: League: Ian Wright (24); All: Ian Wright (26)
- Highest home attendance: 41,703 vs. Manchester United (1 February 1992)
- Lowest home attendance: 22,096 vs. Oldham Athletic (10 March 1992)
- Average home league attendance: 30,611
Home colours	Away colours

The 1991–92 season was the 96th season of competitive football played by Arsenal Football Club. The club, managed by George Graham, entered the season as Football League First Division champions, with only one defeat in the previous campaign. In spite of scoring the most goals in the division, Arsenal ended the season in fourth position, ten points behind league champions Leeds United. The club exited the FA Cup after defeat by Fourth Division opponents Wrexham and fell at the same stage of the Football League Cup to fellow First Division club Coventry City. Arsenal represented England in the European Cup; the club was the first to do so since the ban on English teams from playing in European club competitions. Their time in the competition was brief however as Portuguese team Benfica eliminated them in the second round.

Arsenal signed striker Ian Wright for a club record fee of £2.5 million in September 1991. Defender Pål Lydersen and midfielder Jimmy Carter later joined the club. Stuart Young moved to Hull City, whereas Michael Thomas joined Liverpool. This season saw the first appearance of the now-iconic 'bruised banana' away kit.

After undertaking a series of friendlies, Arsenal played Tottenham Hotspur in the Charity Shield and drew 0–0 to share the honour. Defeats by Everton and Aston Villa set the tone for the league season as the team were left with much to do; a poor run of form during the Christmas and New Year period effectively ruled the team out of retaining the championship. Arsenal finished the season strongly however – unbeaten in 16 matches, to end the campaign in fourth place. Wright was Arsenal's top goalscorer with 26 goals.

== Background ==
Arsenal's failure to retain the league championship in the 1989–90 season prompted manager George Graham to make changes to improve his side; he signed goalkeeper David Seaman and Swedish winger Anders Limpar in the close season. Arsenal made a good start to the league campaign, but had two points deducted in October 1990, after ten of their players were involved in a brawl with Manchester United players, in a match at Old Trafford. In December, captain Tony Adams was sentenced to four months' imprisonment for drink driving. Despite these setbacks, Arsenal lost only one league match all season (away to Chelsea) and finished on 83 points, seven ahead of runners-up Liverpool. They also reached the FA Cup semi-finals, where they faced Tottenham Hotspur. Midfielder Paul Gascoigne scored from a free kick after just five minutes and Tottenham went on to win 3–1, ending hopes of a second Double. Nevertheless, the impressive league form prompted Manchester United manager Alex Ferguson to comment that Arsenal had the platform to "do really well next season", particularly in Europe.

It was the last season that Arsenal played in front of their famous North Bank terrace, which was being demolished over the summer of 1992 to make way for a new all-seater stand which was scheduled for completion during 1993, by which time Highbury was set to have an all-seater capacity of just under 40,000. These changes were necessary due to the Taylor Report, which required all clubs in the highest two divisions of English football to have an all-seater stadium by August 1994.

=== Transfers ===
Striker Ian Wright moved from Crystal Palace to Arsenal a month into the season; at £2.5 million he became the club's most expensive signing yet. Palace chairman Ron Noades revealed the club had offered the player a new deal, but "Ian was hankering for a move. He wanted to play in Europe and Arsenal was the club he wanted to join." Arsenal paid £500,000 each for midfielder Jimmy Carter and Pål Lydersen, a Norwegian defender. Graham and Lydersen were in attendance for Norway's international match against the Soviet Union in September 1991; he later agreed personal terms to join Arsenal. In December 1991, Michael Thomas left Arsenal and moved to Liverpool, the club he famously scored against to win the league title for Arsenal in 1989.

In

Position	Player	Transferred from	Fee	Date	Ref
FW	Ian Wright	Crystal Palace	£2,500,000	24 September 1991	
MF	Jimmy Carter	Liverpool	£500,000	8 October 1991	
DF	Pål Lydersen	I.K. Start	£500,000	20 November 1991	

Out

Position	Player	Transferred to	Fee	Date	Ref
MF	Kwame Ampadu	West Bromwich Albion	£500,000	June 1991	
FW	Stuart Young	Hull City	Free	11 July 1991	
MF	Michael Thomas	Liverpool	£1,500,000	13 December 1991	

Loan out

Position	Player	Club	Date	Return	Ref
GK	Alan Miller	West Bromwich Albion	15 August 1991	18 December 1991	
GK	Alan Miller	Birmingham City	19 December 1991	31 May 1992	
DF	Steve Morrow	Watford	14 August 1991	29 October 1991	
DF	Steve Morrow	Reading	30 October 1991	3 March 1992	
DF	Steve Morrow	Barnet	4 March 1992	31 May 1992	
FW	Andrew Cole	Fulham	5 September 1991	11 March 1992	
FW	Andrew Cole	Bristol City	12 March 1992	One month	

== Pre-season and friendlies ==
In preparation for the forthcoming season, Arsenal played a series of friendlies. The tour of Sweden was a success, with three wins in the space of a week. Arsenal then travelled back to England and beat Plymouth Argyle, before hosting Celtic, Panathinaikos and Sampdoria at Highbury. Arsenal ended their pre-season with a 3–1 victory against Watford, who staged their centenary match. Three further friendlies were played in 1992, one of which was a testimonial for Barry Fry, the manager of Barnet.

Date	Opponents	Venue	Result	Score	Scorers	Attendance
17 July 1991	Team Malarvik	A	W	4–1	Campbell, Smith, (2) Groves	3,217
20 July 1991	Trollhättan	A	W	1–0	Hillier	3,504
22 July 1991	IFK Eskilstuna	A	W	6–1	Dixon (pen.), Hillier, Campbell, Davis, Smith, Limpar	6,015
26 July 1991	Plymouth Argyle	A	W	2–0	Campbell, Smith	7,719
30 July 1991	Celtic	H	D	2–2	Dixon, Smith	28,639
3 August 1991	Panathinaikos	H	W	1–0	Rocastle	19,883
4 August 1991	Sampdoria	H	D	1–1	Merson	18,267
7 August 1991	Watford	A	W	3–1	Dixon, Campbell, o.g.	10,019
29 February 1992	Barnet	A	W	6–0	Parlour, Wright, Campbell (2), Limpar, Smith	4,484
5 March 1992	Shelbourne	A	D	1–1	Smith	8,500
5 May 1992	APOEL	A	D	1–1	Smith	?

Colour key: Green = Arsenal win; Yellow = draw; Red = opponents win. Arsenal score ordered first. Source:

== FA Charity Shield ==
As league champions, Arsenal contested the 1991 FA Charity Shield against local rivals Tottenham Hotspur, who had beaten Nottingham Forest to win the 1991 FA Cup Final. Anders Limpar was absent for Arsenal, as he had sustained a knee injury while on duty for Sweden. David O'Leary started in place of the injured Steve Bould and midfielder David Hillier was picked ahead of Michael Thomas in midfield. In spite of dominating territorial advantage, Arsenal were held to a 0–0 draw, meaning each team held the trophy for six months. Graham commentated that Arsenal played below their usual standard and accepted that his team needed to work on their finishing, in order to make use of their possession.

10 August 1991 Final	Arsenal	0–0	Tottenham Hotspur	Millennium Stadium, London
14:00 BST				Attendance: 67,337; Referee: Terry Holbrook

== Football League First Division ==
A total of 22 teams competed in the First Division in the 1991–92 season. Each team played 42 matches; two against every other team and one match at each club's stadium. Three points were awarded for each win, one point per draw, and none for defeats. This was Arsenal's final season in the Football League; in 1992 they and 21 other clubs joined the newly formed Premier League, which became the top division of English football from the 1992–93 season onwards.

=== August–October ===
Arsenal started their defence of the league championship at home to Queens Park Rangers on 17 August 1991. It was the visitors who had led the match right from the 15th minute, but for Arsenal midfielder Paul Merson to earn his side a point after equalising well into stoppage time. The draw according to The Independent showcased the need for reinforcements: "... not just to improve the squad, but also to cause a buzz in the dressing room". Arsenal were beaten 3–1 by Everton at Goodison Park three days after and lost to Aston Villa by the same scoreline. Graham dismissed any talk of crisis, saying "I have been in football too long to think it is going to be nice and comfortable every season" and felt the performance at Villa showed signs of improvement compared to the earlier league fixtures. A 2–0 win at home to Luton Town was followed by victory against Manchester City, where Alan Smith and Limpar scored a goal apiece.

September began with a trip to Elland Road to face Leeds United. Arsenal's two-goal lead was overturned by the opposition, who secured a draw after Lee Chapman equalised in injury time. Had this been the winning goal, "it would have been a gross injustice for Arsenal" opined John Roberts of The Independent. Lee Dixon scored an "amazing" own goal against Coventry City on 7 September 1991, which set Arsenal on their way to their third defeat of the season. The team responded by defeating Crystal Palace 4–1; Kevin Campbell scored his first two goals of the league season. Arsenal scored four first half goals against Sheffield United on 21 September 1991 – the game ended 5–2, which moved them into seventh position – three places up from the previous weekend. By the time Campbell scored Arsenal's fourth "... the North Bank was entitled to sound the ironic chant, 'Boring, boring, Arsenal'," said reporter Jasper Rees. Wright scored three league goals for Arsenal on his league debut, away to Southampton.

Arsenal defeated Chelsea at home in the first weekend of October. The team found themselves two goals down after 20 minutes, but a converted Dixon penalty and goals from Wright and Campbell turned the score around in their favour. Arsenal came away from Old Trafford with a point against league leaders Manchester United on 19 October 1991. After a midweek European football match, Arsenal beat Notts County by two goals, a result which moved them fourth in the table.

=== November–February ===
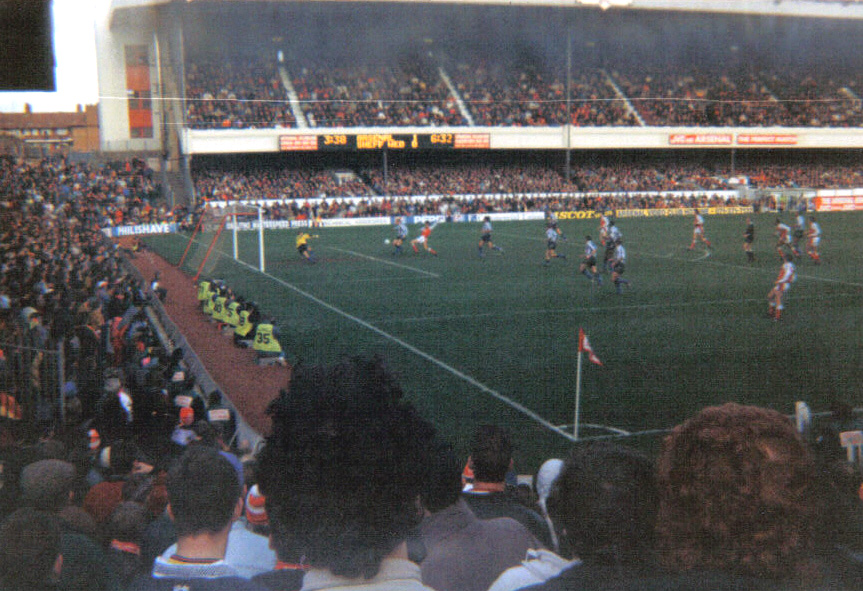
Arsenal in action against Sheffield Wednesday at Highbury, February 1992

The visit of West Ham United to Highbury produced a 1–0 defeat for Arsenal; the winning goal scored by Mike Small came in the 76th minute. Arsenal's conserved performance was attributed to their upcoming European Cup match, something Graham categorically denied: "I'm not even thinking about next Wednesday." Arsenal drew away to Oldham Athletic and then Sheffield Wednesday, extending a winless run of five games in all competitions. The team beat Tottenham on 1 December 1991 to go fourth in the league table, 10 points behind the leaders. Arsenal's aspiration to defend the league title suffered to Nottingham Forest; though the team scored twice in the second half they were unable to overturn the home side's three-goal lead and collected no points. David Hillier opined that his team "should have done better in the first half – that's when we really lost it." Wright scored all of Arsenal's four goals against Everton, but scored none in the team's Boxing Day defeat by Luton Town. Graham called it Arsenal's worst performance of the season and was critical of his players' attitude. Although the team's concentration and effort improved according to Peter Ball of The Times in their next game – away to Manchester City, Arsenal lost for the second consecutive league match. They ended the calendar year in seventh position, 16 points behind the leaders Manchester United.

January saw Arsenal's title challenge falter; the team went on a four-match winless run. At home, they only merited draws to Wimbledon, Aston Villa and QPR – the latter two were scoreless. Arsenal were beaten 2–0 by Liverpool on 29 January 1992; journalist Derek Hodgson said this was in spite of playing "crisper" and more confident football. A draw against Manchester United on 1 February 1992 came before a win away to Notts County. A crowd of 22,352 witnessed Arsenal draw once more at home, this time against Norwich City. Rockets were launched on the pitch during the match by Arsenal supporters, in protest of the club's bond scheme. Arsenal recorded their biggest win of the season, scoring seven past Sheffield Wednesday, on 15 February 1992. Campbell, who began the match as a substitute, came on and scored two goals; six of Arsenal's goals came in the second half. Arsenal ended February with a 1–1 draw away to Tottenham. After 30 games, the team were in sixth position, 18 points behind Manchester United in first.

=== March–May ===
After a fortnight of inactivity in all competitions Arsenal faced Oldham Athletic at Highbury. The team won 2–1 on a day where O'Leary registered his 700th league appearance. Wright scored both of Arsenal's goals against West Ham on 14 March 1992, which inflicted a fifth consecutive league defeat on his opponents. Merson's late equaliser against Leeds United the following week earned Arsenal a point. Against Wimbledon Ray Parlour scored inside the first minute, which set Arsenal on to a 3–1 victory. The third win in four league matches moved Arsenal to fifth position and left journalist Ball to opine: "How the champions must be regretting earlier inconsistency." March ended with a "highly entertaining game" so said match reporter Dennis Signy between Arsenal and Nottingham Forest at Highbury. Arsenal took the lead after five minutes when Dixon converted a penalty kick – it was awarded after Ian Woan was adjudged to have fouled Limpar in the 18-yard box. Forest equalised in the 41st minute, and made it 2–1 moments before the interval. They extend their lead through Roy Keane in the 71st minute, but Arsenal scored twice in the final five minutes to draw.

A 1–0 victory against Coventry City meant Arsenal were five points behind Sheffield Wednesday, who lay in third spot. Arsenal continued their strong finish to the season by scoring seven goals in the space of three days – three away to Norwich City and four at home to Crystal Palace. The team, without the suspended Wright for the trip to Sheffield United came away from Bramall Lane with a point. Arsenal beat Liverpool 4–0 on 21 April 1992, which marked the opposition's biggest defeat in nine years. A draw at Chelsea ended Arsenal's chances of finishing in a UEFA Cup place. Arsenal ended the league campaign with a 5–1 win against Southampton at home. Wright overtook Tottenham striker Gary Lineker as the league's top goalscorer by scoring three on the day which took his total to 29 (24 of those scored for Arsenal) – one more than Lineker.

=== Results ===
Date	Opponents	Venue	Result	Score	Scorers	Attendance	Ref
17 August 1991	Queens Park Rangers	H	D	1–1	Merson 90'	38,099	
20 August 1991	Everton	A	L	1–3	Winterburn 87'	31,200	
24 August 1991	Aston Villa	A	L	1–3	Smith 45'	29,684	
27 August 1991	Luton Town	H	W	2–0	Merson 18', Smith 50'	25,898	
31 August 1991	Manchester City	H	W	2–1	Smith 46', Limpar 77'	35,009	
3 September 1991	Leeds United	A	D	2–2	Smith 20', 48'	29,396	
7 September 1991	Coventry City	H	L	1–2	Adams 88'	28,142	
14 September 1991	Crystal Palace	A	W	4–1	Campbell 16', 81', Smith 55', Thomas 57'	24,228	
21 September 1991	Sheffield United	H	W	5–2	Smith 12', Dixon 16' (pen.), Rocastle 25', Campbell 34', Groves 67'	30,244	
28 September 1991	Southampton	A	W	4–0	Rocastle 39', Wright 48', 53', 75'	18,050	
5 October 1991	Chelsea	H	W	3–2	Dixon 30' (pen.), Wright 47', Campbell 70'	42,074	
19 October 1991	Manchester United	A	D	1–1	Rocastle 39'	46,594	
26 October 1991	Notts County	H	W	2–0	Smith 69', Wright 75'	30,011	
2 November 1991	West Ham United	H	L	0–1		33,539	
16 November 1991	Oldham Athletic	A	D	1–1	Wright 86'	15,681	
23 November 1991	Sheffield Wednesday	A	D	1–1	Bould 64'	32,174	
1 December 1991	Tottenham Hotspur	H	W	2–0	Wright 68', Campbell 77'	38,892	
8 December 1991	Nottingham Forest	A	L	2–3	Merson 75', Smith 78'	22,095	
21 December 1991	Everton	H	W	4–2	Wright 4', 13', 26', 70'	29,684	
26 December 1991	Luton Town	A	L	0–1		12,665	
28 December 1991	Manchester City	A	L	0–1		32,325	
1 January 1992	Wimbledon	H	D	1–1	Merson 46'	26,339	
11 January 1992	Aston Villa	H	D	0–0		31,413	
18 January 1992	Queens Park Rangers	A	D	0–0		20,497	
29 January 1992	Liverpool	A	L	0–2		33,753	
1 February 1992	Manchester United	H	D	1–1	Rocastle 44'	41,703	
8 February 1992	Notts County	A	W	1–0	Smith 19'	11,221	
11 February 1992	Norwich City	H	D	1–1	Merson 63'	22,352	
15 February 1992	Sheffield Wednesday	H	W	7–1	Smith 13', Campbell 71', 81, Limpar 73', 89', Merson 83', Wright 85'	26,805	
22 February 1992	Tottenham Hotspur	A	D	1–1	Wright 89'	33,124	
10 March 1992	Oldham Athletic	H	W	2–1	Wright 35', Merson 59'	22,096	
14 March 1992	West Ham United	A	W	2–0	Wright 13', 51'	22,640	
22 March 1992	Leeds United	H	D	1–1	Merson 80'	27,844	
28 March 1992	Wimbledon	A	W	3–1	Parlour 1', Wright 7', Campbell 64'	11,299	
31 March 1992	Nottingham Forest	H	D	3–3	Dixon 5' (pen.), Merson 85', Adams 89'	27,036	
4 April 1992	Coventry City	A	W	1–0	Campbell 28'	14,133	
8 April 1992	Norwich City	A	W	3–1	Wright 33' (pen.), 82', Campbell 46'	22,352	
11 April 1992	Crystal Palace	H	W	4–1	Merson 9', 12', 64', Campbell 16'	36,016	
18 April 1992	Sheffield United	A	D	1–1	Campbell 58'	25,034	
20 April 1992	Liverpool	H	W	4–0	Hillier 6', Wright 16', 47', Limpar 40'	38,517	
25 April 1992	Chelsea	A	D	1–1	Dixon 88'	26,003	
2 May 1992	Southampton	H	W	5–1	Campbell 66', Wright 70' (pen.), 89', 90', Smith 83'	37,702	

Colour key: Green = Arsenal win; Yellow = draw; Red = opponents win. Arsenal score ordered first.

=== Classification ===
Pos	Team	Pld	W	D	L	GF	GA	GD	Pts	Qualification or relegation
2	Manchester United	42	21	15	6	63	33	+30	78	Qualification for the UEFA Cup first round and qualification for the FA Premier League (Note: Manchester United also won the League Cup – that UEFA Cup qualifying place was passed down to the third-placed League team.)
3	Sheffield Wednesday	42	21	12	9	62	49	+13	75	Qualification for the UEFA Cup first round and qualification for the FA Premier League
4	Arsenal	42	19	15	8	81	46	+35	72	Qualification for the FA Premier League
5	Manchester City	42	20	10	12	61	48	+13	70	Qualification for the FA Premier League
6	Liverpool	42	16	16	10	47	40	+7	64	Qualification for the European Cup Winners' Cup first round and qualification for the FA Premier League

Source: World Football
Rules for classification: 1) Points; 2) Goal difference; 3) Goals scored

==== Results summary ====
Overall								Home						Away					
Pld	W	D	L	GF	GA	GD	Pts	W	D	L	GF	GA	GD	W	D	L	GF	GA	GD
42	19	15	8	81	46	+35	72	12	7	2	51	22	+29	7	8	6	30	24	+6

==== League position ====
Round	1	2	3	4	5	6	7	8	9	10	11	12	13	14	15	16	17	18	19	20	21	22	23	24	25	26	27	28	29	30	31	32	33	34	35	36	37	38	39	40	41	42
Result	D	L	L	W	W	D	L	W	W	W	W	D	W	L	D	D	W	L	W	L	L	D	D	D	L	D	W	D	W	D	W	W	D	W	D	W	W	W	D	W	D	W
Position	11	17	21	13	12	9	15	10	7	3	3	4	4	5	6	6	4	6	6	7	7	7	7	7	7	8	6	6	6	6	6	6	6	5	5	4	4	4	4	4	4	4

W = Win; D = Draw; L = Loss

== FA Cup ==
Arsenal entered the FA Cup in the third round (last 64), in which they were drawn to face Wrexham of the Football League Fourth Division away from home. Smith's goal had given Arsenal the lead just before half time, but Wrexham equalised through a Mickey Thomas free kick with eight minutes of the match remaining. Steve Watkin scored the winning goal two minutes after, once Adams failed to clear the ball in the penalty box. The cup exit did not prompt Graham to criticise his players; he bluntly said: "I thought they played very well. We just didn't finish them off."

The result was described by BBC Sport in 2011 as "one of the greatest FA Cup giant-killings of all time".

Round	Date	Opponents	Venue	Result	Score	Scorers	Attendance	Ref
Third round	4 January 1992	Wrexham	A	L	1–2	Smith 45'	13,343	

Colour key: Green = Arsenal win; Yellow = draw; Red = opponents win. Arsenal score ordered first.

== Football League Cup ==
Arsenal entered the Football League Cup in the second round, where they were drawn against Leicester City in a two-legged tie. The first match ended 1–1; Wright scored 44 minutes into his debut. Wright and Merson each scored for Arsenal in the second leg which ensured progress into the third round. It was there the team exited the competition following a 1–0 defeat, away to Coventry City.

Round	Date	Opponents	Venue	Result	Score	Scorers	Attendance	Ref
Second round first leg	25 September 1991	Leicester City	A	D	1–1	Wright 44'	20,679	
Second round second leg	8 October 1991	Leicester City	H	W	2–0	Wright 54', Merson 75'	28,580	
Third round	30 October 1991	Coventry City	A	L	0–1		15,337	

Colour key: Green = Arsenal win; Yellow = draw; Red = opponents win. Arsenal score ordered first.

== European Cup ==
As league champions, Arsenal participated in the European Cup, where they were drawn to face Austria Wien in the first round. This marked the first time that England was represented in Europe's premier competition since the Heysel disaster in 1985. In the first leg, Arsenal were awarded a penalty after 24 minutes, which Dixon missed. Linighan opened the scoring seven minutes before the interval, when goalkeeper Iliya Valov failed to deal with a cross. Smith then scored four goals for the team in the space of 16 minutes – "The England striker responded resoundingly to Graham Taylor's criticism of his ineffective performance against Germany a week earlier," said The Guardian correspondent David Lacey. Andreas Ogris reduced Arsenal's lead, before Limpar added a sixth, taking the ball on unchallenged and shooting from a narrow angle. Arsenal lost the second leg 1–0 at the Franz Horr Stadium on 2 October 1991, but progressed as they won 6–2 on aggregate.

In spite of earning a draw against Benfica away from home the following round, first leg, Arsenal were eliminated from the tournament, in extra time at home on 6 November 1991. Graham offered no complaints in witnessing his side going out, by saying: "Benfica played very well once we went 1–0 up. Their attack was superb. We could have done with more anticipation in the box."

Round	Date	Opponents	Venue	Result	Score	Scorers	Attendance	Referee	Reference
First round first leg	18 September 1991	Austria Wien	H	W	6–1	Linighan 38', Smith 50', 52', 65', 66', Limpar 79'	24,124	Aleksey Spirin (Russia)	
First round second leg	2 October 1991	Austria Wien	A	L	0–1		11,000	Aleksey Spirin (Russia)	
Second round first leg	23 October 1991	Benfica	A	D	1–1	Campbell 18'	80,000	Tullio Lanese (Italy)	
Second round second leg	6 November 1991	Benfica	H	L	1–3	Pates 20'	35,815	Aron Schmidhuber (Germany)	

Colour key: Green = Arsenal win; Yellow = draw; Red = opponents win. Arsenal score ordered first.

== Squad statistics ==
Arsenal used a total of 24 players during the 1991–92 season and there were 16 different goalscorers. There were also two squad members who did not make a first-team appearance in the campaign. Merson featured in 50 matches – the most of any Arsenal outfield player in the campaign. Seaman started in all 42 league matches. The team scored a total of 92 goals in all competitions. The top goalscorer was Wright, with 26 goals – 24 of which were scored in the league.

Key

No. = Squad number

Pos = Playing position

Nat. = Nationality

Apps = Appearances

GK = Goalkeeper

DF = Defender

MF = Midfielder

FW = Forward

Numbers in parentheses denote appearances as substitute. Players with name struck through and marked † left the club during the playing season.

Pos.	Nat.	Name	League		FA Cup		League Cup		Europe		Charity Shield		Total	
Pos.	Nat.	Name	Apps	Goals	Apps	Goals	Apps	Goals	Apps	Goals	Apps	Goals	Apps	Goals
GK	(England)	David Seaman	42	0	1	0	3	0	4	0	1	0	51	0
DF	(England)	Nigel Winterburn	41	1	1	0	2	0	4	0	1	0	49	1
DF	(England)	Lee Dixon	38	4	1	0	3	0	4	0	1	0	47	4
DF	(England)	Tony Adams	35	2	1	0	3	0	4	0	1	0	44	2
DF	(England)	Steve Bould	24 (1)	1	0	0	0	0	(1)	0	1	0	25 (2)	1
DF	(England)	Andy Linighan	15 (2)	0	0	0	1 (1)	0	2	1	0	0	18 (3)	1
DF	(Republic of Ireland)	David O'Leary	11 (14)	0	1	0	(1)	0	1	0	1	0	13 (15)	0
DF	(England)	Colin Pates	9 (2)	0	0	0	2	0	2	1	0	0	13 (2)	1
DF	(Norway)	Pål Lydersen	5 (2)	0	0	0	0	0	0	0	0	0	5 (2)	0
DF	(Northern Ireland)	Steve Morrow	(2)	0	0	0	0	0	0	0	0	0	(2)	0
MF	(England)	David Rocastle	36 (3)	4	1	0	3	0	4	0	1	0	45 (3)	4
MF	(England)	David Hillier	27	1	1	0	0	0	0	0	1	0	29	1
MF	(Sweden)	Anders Limpar	23 (6)	4	0	0	1	0	3	1	0	0	27 (6)	5
MF	(England)	Paul Davis	12	4	0	0	2	0	3	0	1	0	18	0
MF	(England)	Michael Thomas †	6 (4)	1	0	0	2	0	1 (1)	0	(1)	0	9 (6)	1
MF	(England)	Perry Groves	5 (8)	1	(1)	0	1 (2)	0	(4)	0	0	0	6 (15)	1
MF	(England)	Jimmy Carter	5 (1)	0	1	0	0	0	0	0	0	0	6 (1)	0
MF	(England)	Ray Parlour	2 (4)	1	0	0	0	0	0	0	0	0	2 (4)	1
MF	(England)	Neil Heaney	(1)	0	0	0	0	0	0	0	0	0	(1)	0
FW	(England)	Paul Merson	41 (1)	12	1	0	3	1	4	0	1	0	49 (1)	13
FW	(England)	Alan Smith	33 (6)	12	1	1	2	0	4	4	1	0	41 (6)	17
FW	(England)	Ian Wright	30	24	0	0	3	2	0	0	0	0	33	26
FW	(England)	Kevin Campbell	22 (9)	13	1	0	2	0	4	1	1	0	29 (9)	14
FW	(England)	Andy Cole	0	0	0	0	0	0	0	0	(1)	0	(1)	0

== See also ==
- 1991–92 in English football
- List of Arsenal F.C. seasons
