= Colin Pates =

English footballer (born 1961)

Personal information
- Full name: Colin George Pates
- Date of birth: 10 August 1961 (age 65)
- Place of birth: Wimbledon, London, England
- Height: 5 ft 11 in (1.80 m)
- Position: Defender

Youth career
- Chelsea

Senior career*
Years	Team	Apps	(Gls)
1979–1988	Chelsea	281	(10)
1988–1990	Charlton Athletic	38	(0)
1990–1993	Arsenal	21	(0)
1990–1991	→ Brighton & Hove Albion (loan)	17	(0)
1993–1995	Brighton & Hove Albion	50	(0)
1995–1996	Crawley Town		
1997	Romford	4	(0)
Total		410	(11)

International career
1979–1980	England Youth	11	(0)

Managerial career
- 1995–1996: Crawley Town
- 1998–1999: Wingate & Finchley
- * Club domestic league appearances and goals

Colin George Pates (born 10 August 1961) is an English former professional footballer who made more than 400 appearances in the Football League. He played for various clubs, mainly in London, in a defensive role.

== Career ==
Pates was born in Wimbledon, London. He began his career with Chelsea, making his debut as an 18-year-old in a 7–3 victory against Orient in 1979. He remained with Chelsea through the turbulent early 1980s and as club captain led the side to promotion in 1983–84. He was sold to Charlton Athletic in October 1988 for £400,000 having made 346 appearances for the Blues.

15 months later Pates joined Arsenal for £500,000 in January 1990. His debut for Arsenal came at Hillsborough against Sheffield Wednesday 17 February 1990. Arsenal, already having Steve Bould, Tony Adams, David O'Leary and Andy Linighan dominating the centre half positions, Pates was reduced to playing in only 12 full League games in his stay at Highbury of over two and a half years.

He was part of the Arsenal side that won the First Division in 1991 but only played in one match, which was not enough games to earn a winner's medal. He came in as a substitute for Linighan after 63 minutes against Crystal Palace at Highbury 23 February 1991. Pates was loaned out to Brighton & Hove Albion when the club had an injury crisis, for the rest of the 1990-91 season, playing a valuable role and helped them reach the Second Division play-offs.

Pates became an important figure for Arsenal in the 1991-92 season, when he stepped in to cover for injuries to Adams and Bould. His only goal for the Gunners came when he scored the goal that put Arsenal in front against Benfica in the European Cup second round tie at Highbury 6 November 1991. Arsenal had granted Pates a Free transfer in August 1993 and a move to Brighton & Hove Albion became permanent.

After a knee injury forced his retirement from the top-level game, he moved into coaching. He was appointed player-manager of Crawley Town, leaving in 1996, and then had a brief stint playing for Romford. He gained coaching qualifications while managing Wingate & Finchley, and since 2001 has coached football at Whitgift School in South Croydon.

== Honours ==
Chelsea

- Full Members' Cup: 1985–86
