= Oleh Volotek =

Ukrainian footballer

Personal information
- Full name: Oleh Viktorovych Volotek
- Date of birth: 15 August 1967 (age 59)
- Place of birth: Novocherkassk, Russian SFSR
- Height: 1.74 m (5 ft 9 in)
- Position: Midfielder

Youth career
- ShISP Voroshilovgrad

Senior career*
| Years | Team | Apps | (Gls) |
| 1984–1986 | FC Zarya Voroshilovgrad | 57 | (2) |
| 1987 | SKA Kyiv | 41 | (7) |
| 1989–1991 | FC Zorya Luhansk | 119 | (23) |
| 1992–1997 | FC Dynamo Kyiv | 13 | (2) |
| 1993 | → FC Asmaral Moscow (loan) | 24 | (2) |
| 1994 | → FC Dynamo-2 Kyiv | 15 | (0) |
| 1994 | → FC Kryvbas Kryvyi Rih (loan) | 1 | (0) |
| 1995 | → SK Mykolaiv (loan) | 2 | (0) |
| 1995 | → FC Azovets Mariupol (loan) | 2 | (0) |
| 1996–1997 | → FC Fakel Varva (loan) | 14 | (3) |
| 1997 | → FC Kryvbas Kryvyi Rih (loan) | 1 | (0) |
| 1997 | SV Babelsberg 03 | | |
| 1998 | FC Metallurg Krasnoyarsk | 22 | (4) |
| 1999–2000 | FC Torpedo Zaporizhia | 15 | (0) |
| 2000 | → FC Stal Alchevsk (loan) | 5 | (0) |
| 2000 | FC Fakel Varva | 0 | (0) |
| 2001 | FC Zakarpattia Uzhhorod | 15 | (0) |
| 2001 | → FC Zakarpattia-2 Uzhhorod | 3 | (0) |
| 2002 | TP-47 | 13 | (2) |
- * Club domestic league appearances and goals

Oleh Viktorovych Volotek (Ukrainian: Олег Вікторович Волотек; Russian: Олег Викторович Волотёк; born 15 August 1967) is a Ukrainian former professional footballer.

== Club career ==
He made his professional debut in the Soviet First League in 1984 for FC Zarya Voroshilovgrad. He played 3 games in the 1991–92 European Cup for FC Dynamo Kyiv.

== Honours ==
- Ukrainian Premier League champion: 1993.
- Ukrainian Premier League runner-up: 1992.
