= Zaya Avdysh =

Ukrainian footballer and coach

Personal information
- Full name: Zaya Zedovych Avdysh
- Date of birth: 25 August 1945
- Place of birth: Kyiv, Ukrainian SSR
- Date of death: 21 May 2015 (aged 69)
- Place of death: Zhytomyr, Ukraine
- Position: Defender

Senior career*
Years	Team	Apps	(Gls)
1965	FC Polissya Zhytomyr		
1967	FC Pakhtakor Kurgan-Tube		
1971	FC Sakhalin Yuzhno-Sakhalinsk		
1971	FC Vulkan Petropavlovsk-Kamchatskiy		
1972	FC Dynamo Makhachkala		
1972	FC Vostok Ust-Kamenogorsk		

Managerial career
- 1977: FC Turbina Naberezhnye Chelny
- 1989: FC Polissya Zhytomyr
- 1991–1992: FC Polissya Zhytomyr
- 1992–1993: FC Temp Shepetivka
- 1995: Khimik Zhytomyr
- 1998–2000: FC Polissya Zhytomyr
- 2001–2003: FC Polissya Zhytomyr
- 2004: FC Polissya Zhytomyr
- * Club domestic league appearances and goals

Zaya Avdysh (Ukrainian: Зая Зедович Авдиш) was a Soviet football player and Ukrainian football coach and the president of FC Polissya Zhytomyr in 1999–2004.

Zaya was a brother of another football player and later a football referee Valeriy Avdysh.
