= Antti Heinola =

Finnish footballer (born 1973)

Personal information
- Full name: Antti Heinola
- Date of birth: 20 March 1973 (age 53)
- Place of birth: Helsinki, Finland
- Height: 1.80 m (5 ft 11 in)
- Position: Right back

Senior career*
Years	Team	Apps	(Gls)
1991–1996	HJK	111	(6)
1996–1997	Emmen	19	(0)
1997–1998	Heracles Almelo	31	(3)
1998–2001	QPR	33	(0)
2001–2003	HJK	65	(1)

International career
1994–2001	Finland	12	(0)
- * Club domestic league appearances and goals

Antti Heinola (born 20 March 1973) is a Finnish former footballer.

== Club career ==
Heinola began his professional career with HJK Helsinki and returned to the club to finish his career. He signed for QPR in 1998 for £100,000, and made his debut vs Nottingham Forest on 2 January 1998, in the 0–1 home defeat.

== Career statistics ==
As of 1 September 2024.

Appearances and goals by club, season and competition
Club	Season	League			Cup (Note: Includes Suomen Cup and FA Cup)		League cup (Note: Includes EFL League Cup)		Europe		Total	
Club	Season	Division	Apps	Goals	Apps	Goals	Apps	Goals	Apps	Goals	Apps	Goals
HJK	1991	Veikkausliiga	18	0	–		–		1 (Note: Appearance(s) in European Cup)	0	19	0
HJK	1992	Veikkausliiga	20	0	–		–		–		20	0
HJK	1993	Veikkausliiga	22	2	–		–		4 (Note: Appearances in UEFA Champions League)	1	26	3
HJK	1994	Veikkausliiga	23	3	–		–		4 (Note: Appearances in UEFA Cup Winners' Cup)	1	27	4
HJK	1995	Veikkausliiga	24	1	–		–		4 (Note: Appearances in UEFA Intertoto Cup)	1	28	2
HJK	1996	Veikkausliiga	4	0	–		–		2 (Note: Appearances in UEFA Cup)	0	6	0
HJK	Total		111	6	0	0	0	0	15	3	126	9
Emmen	1995–96	Eerste Divisie	10	0	–		–		–		10	0
Emmen	1996–97	Eerste Divisie	9	0	–		–		–		9	0
Emmen	Total		19	0	0	0	0	0	0	0	19	0
Heracles Almelo	1996–97	Eerste Divisie	13	0	–		–		–		13	0
Heracles Almelo	1997–98	Eerste Divisie	18	3	–		–		–		18	3
Heracles Almelo	Total		31	3	0	0	0	0	0	0	31	3
Queen's Park Rangers	1997–98	First Division	10	0	0	0	0	0	–		10	0
Queen's Park Rangers	1998–99	First Division	23	0	1	0	0	0	–		24	0
Queen's Park Rangers	1999–00	First Division	0	0	–		–		–		0	0
Queen's Park Rangers	2000–01	First Division	1	0	0	0	1	0	–		2	0
Queen's Park Rangers	Total		34	0	1	0	1	0	0	0	36	0
HJK	2001	Veikkausliiga	18	0	–		–		4	0	22	0
HJK	2002	Veikkausliiga	18	0	–		–		–		18	0
HJK	2003	Veikkausliiga	25	1	1	0	–		4	0	30	1
HJK	Total		61	1	1	0	0	0	8	0	70	1
Career total			256	10	2	0	1	0	23	3	282	13
