= Valeriy Avdysh =

Ukrainian footballer and referee

Personal information
- Full name: Valeriy Zedovych Avdysh
- Date of birth: 11 November 1950 (age 75)
- Place of birth: Zhytomyr, Soviet Union
- Position: Defender

Senior career*
Years	Team	Apps	(Gls)
1970	FC Avtomobilist Zhytomyr		
1970	FC Horyn Rivne		
1971	FC Vulkan Petropavlovsk-Kamchatsky		(1)
1975	FC Avtomobilist Zhytomyr		
1976–1977	FC Spartak Ivano-Frankivsk	75	(1)
1978–1980	SC Tavriya Simferopol	65	(0)
1981–1982	FC Prykarpattia Ivano-Frankivsk	78	(2)
- * Club domestic league appearances and goals

Refereeing career
Domestic
Years	League	Role
1989–1991	Soviet Top League	Referee, linesman
1999–present	Ukrainian Premier League	Referee

International
Years	League	Role
1996-?	FIFA listed	Linesman

Valeriy Avdysh (11 November 1950) is an Assyrian Ukrainian football referee and former footballer who played for SC Tavriya Simferopol. After retiring as a player, Avdysh became a football referee.

Avdysh was a linesman at the exhibition game between Russia and Poland that took place on 2 June 1996 in Moscow, Russia.

Valeriy Avdysh is a younger brother of the late Ukrainian football manager Zaya Avdysh.
