= Petro Buts =

Ukrainian footballer

Personal information
- Full name: Petro Mykolayovych Buts
- Date of birth: 2 June 1966 (age 60)
- Place of birth: Kryvyi Rih, Ukrainian SSR
- Height: 1.76 m (5 ft 9 in)
- Position: Defender

Team information
- Current team: FC Peremoha Dnipro (assistant coach)

Youth career
- FC Kryvbas Kryvyi Rih

Senior career*
Years	Team	Apps	(Gls)
1982–1985	FC Kryvbas Kryvyi Rih	94	(0)
1985–1991	FC Dnipro Dnipropetrovsk	4	(0)
1991	FC Tiligul Tiraspol	20	(0)
1992	FC Nyva Ternopil	14	(0)
1992	FC Kryvbas Kryvyi Rih	9	(0)
1993–1994	SC Mykolaiv	41	(0)
1995	FC Tiligul Tiraspol	3	(0)
1995	FC Khimik Zhytomyr	6	(0)
1996	FC Amkar Perm	11	(0)
1996	FC Druzhba Mahdalynivka		
1998	FC Druzhba Mahdalynivka		
1998	FC Tomiris Shymkent	7	(0)
1999	FC Kairat	24	(0)
2000–2001	FC Aktobe-Lento	6	(0)

Managerial career
- 2018–: FC Peremoha Dnipro (assistant)
- * Club domestic league appearances and goals

Petro Mykolayovych Buts (Ukrainian: Петро Миколайович Буц; born 2 June 1966) is a Ukrainian professional football coach and a former player. He works as an assistant coach with FC Peremoha Dnipro.

== Honours ==
- Soviet Top League champion: 1988.
- Soviet Top League runner-up: 1989.
- Soviet Cup winner: 1989.
- USSR Federation Cup winner: 1989.
- USSR Federation Cup finalist: 1990.
