= Gintaras Kvitkauskas =

Lithuanian footballer

Personal information
- Date of birth: 3 January 1967 (age 59)
- Place of birth: Varėna, Lithuanian SSR, Soviet Union
- Height: 1.76 m (5 ft 9 in)
- Position: Midfielder

Senior career*
Years	Team	Apps	(Gls)
1985–1990	Žalgiris Vilnius	43	(12)
1991	Pakhtakor Tashkent	15	(3)
1992	Dynamo Kyiv	6	(0)
1992	→ Dynamo-2 Kyiv	8	(0)
1993	Veres Rivne	5	(0)
1994–1995	Panerys Vilnius		

International career
1992	Lithuania	5	(0)
- * Club domestic league appearances and goals

Gintaras Kvitkauskas (born 3 January 1967) is a retired Lithuanian international footballer who played as a midfielder.

Kvitkauskas played in the Soviet Top League with FK Žalgiris Vilnius and FC Pakhtakor Tashkent. He was the third Lithuanian to sign for FC Dynamo Kyiv, appearing in six Ukrainian Premier League matches and European matches against Barcelona FC and SL Benfica.
