= Lesław Grech =

Polish footballer

Personal information
- Date of birth: 17 March 1972 (age 54)
- Place of birth: Lubin, Poland
- Height: 1.80 m (5 ft 11 in)
- Position: Midfielder

Senior career*
Years	Team	Apps	(Gls)
1988–1990	Stal Chocianów		
1990–1992	Zagłębie Lubin	30	(3)
1993–1997	Śląsk Wrocław		
1997–1998	Lechia Zielona Góra		
1998–1999	Chrobry Głogów		
1999–2002	Górnik Polkowice		
2003	BKS Bolesławiec		
2005	Zamet Przemków		
2006–2007	Płomień Radwanice		
- * Club domestic league appearances and goals

Lesław Grech (born 17 March 1972) is a Polish former professional footballer who played as a midfielder.

== Honours ==
Zagłębie Lubin

- Ekstraklasa: 1990–91
