= Dmytro Tutychenko =

Ukrainian footballer

Personal information
- Full name: Dmytro Pavlovych Tutychenko
- Date of birth: 5 March 1970 (age 56)
- Place of birth: Izmail, Soviet Union (now Ukraine)
- Height: 1.76 m (5 ft 9 1/2 in)
- Positions: Forward; midfielder

Senior career*
Years	Team	Apps	(Gls)
1988–1990	Sogdiana Jizzakh	96	(1)
1991–1993	SC Odesa	72	(11)
1993–1995	FC Nyva Ternopil	74	(2)
1996–1997	FC Uralan Elista	66	(6)
1998	FC Dnipro Dnipropetrovsk	25	(0)
1999–2000	FC Uralan Elista	35	(2)
2000	FC Metallurg Lipetsk	14	(0)
- * Club domestic league appearances and goals

Dmytro Pavlovych Tutychenko (Ukrainian: Дмитро Павлович Тутиченко; born 5 March 1970) is a former Ukrainian football player.
