= Petr Vrabec =

Czech football manager and former player (born 1962)

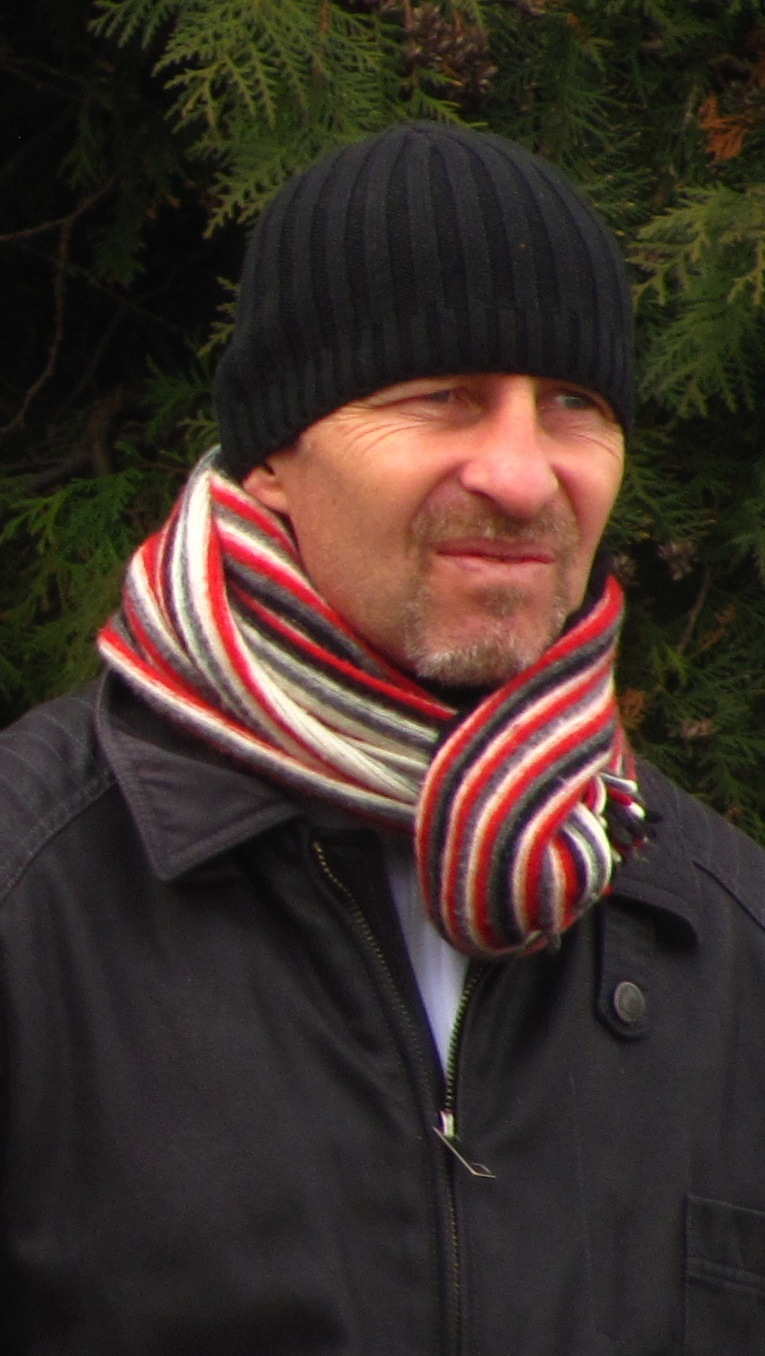

Personal information
- Date of birth: 5 June 1962 (age 64)
- Place of birth: Czechoslovakia
- Position: Defender

Senior career*
Years	Team	Apps	(Gls)
1985–1993	Sparta Prague	168	(21)
1993–1994	Stuttgarter Kickers	31	(2)
1994–1995	Viktoria Žižkov	19	(2)
1996–2000	Chmel Blšany	85	(16)

International career
1993	Representation of Czechs and Slovaks (RCS)	3	(1)
1992	Czechoslovakia B	1	(0)

Managerial career
- 2012: Čáslav
- 2012–2014: Mladá Boleslav (junior team)
- * Club domestic league appearances and goals

Petr Vrabec (born 5 June 1962) is a Czech football manager and former player. He won six Czechoslovak First League titles with Sparta Prague at club level. Vrabec also represented Czechoslovakia, playing three times and scoring once in 1993.

== Playing career ==
=== Club career ===
As a player, Vrabec won six league titles in eight seasons with Sparta Prague, racking up 168 appearances and 21 goals between 1985 and 1993. During the 1991–92 European Cup he scored three goals for the club, including one at the Nou Camp stadium against FC Barcelona. In 1993, he went to Germany to play for Stuttgarter Kickers before returning to his homeland with Viktoria Žižkov in the 1994–95 season. Vrabec played in European competitions with Žižkov, scoring in the 4–3 aggregate win in the qualifying round of the 1994–95 UEFA Cup Winners' Cup against IFK Norrköping. He spent his later career with Chmel Blšany, where he suffered a broken leg, which limited him in his final season with the club. In 2000, he stopped playing in order to become youth coach at Blšany.

=== International career ===
Vrabec played for Czechoslovakia B in 1992, making a single appearance. The following year he made three appearances for Czechoslovakia, scoring one goal in the process. His only international goal came in a 5–2 win for Czechoslovakia against Romania in qualification for the 1994 World Cup.

== Managerial career ==
Vrabec became assistant manager under Karel Jarolím at Gambrinus Liga side 1. FC Synot in 2003 in a sixteen-month spell which ended in December 2004. In April 2005 Vrabec took up a position as Jarolím's assistant again, this time with Slavia Prague.

Vrabec was named manager of Czech 2. Liga side Čáslav in the summer of 2012, but left his position after just seven games, with the club having won just one and drawn two in this time.

== Honours ==
Sparta Prague

- Czechoslovak First League (6): 1986–87, 1987–88, 1988–89, 1989–90, 1990–91, 1992–93
