= Eugeniusz Ptak =

Polish footballer

Personal information
- Date of birth: 1 October 1960 (age 66)
- Place of birth: Marchwacz, Poland
- Height: 1.84 m (6 ft 0 in)
- Position: Forward

Youth career
- 1977–1978: Włókniarz Kalisz

Senior career*
Years	Team	Apps	(Gls)
1978–1980	Włókniarz Kalisz		
1980–1982	Lechia Piechowice		
1982	Śląsk Wrocław	8	(1)
1984	Zagłębie Wałbrzych		
1985–1989	Zagłębie Lubin		
1989–1992	Apollon Limassol		
1992–1993	Nea Salamis Famagusta	24	(8)
1993	Zagłębie Lubin	6	(3)
1994–1995	VfB Oldenburg	40	(4)
1995–1998	Miedź Legnica		
1998–2005	FC Rastatt 04		

International career
1986	Poland U21	1	(1)
- * Club domestic league appearances and goals

Eugeniusz Ptak (born 1 October 1960) is a Polish former professional footballer who played as a forward.

== Honours ==
Zagłębie Lubin

- II liga, group I: 1984–85, 1988–89

Apollon Limassol

- Cypriot First Division: 1990–91
- Cypriot Cup: 1991–92
