= Isaías (footballer, born 1963) =

Brazilian footballer

Personal information
- Full name: Isaías Marques Soares
- Date of birth: 17 November 1963 (age 62)
- Place of birth: Linhares, Brazil
- Height: 1.80 m (5 ft 11 in)
- Position: Forward

Youth career
- Fluminense

Senior career*
Years	Team	Apps	(Gls)
1983	Fluminense		
1984–1986	Friburguense		
1987	Cabofriense	10	(1)
1987–1988	Rio Ave	30	(5)
1988–1990	Boavista	67	(22)
1990–1995	Benfica	125	(52)
1995–1997	Coventry City	12	(2)
1997–1999	Campomaiorense	57	(18)
2000–2001	Cabofriense		
Total		301	(100)
- * Club domestic league appearances and goals

Isaías Marques Soares (born 17 November 1963), known simply as Isaías, is a Brazilian former professional footballer who played as a forward.

He notably played in the Primeira Liga where he made a total of 279 matches and 97 goals during ten seasons, mainly with Benfica where he spent five of those years, winning three major titles. He also played in the Premier League for Coventry City where he was the first Brazilian to play in the league. He also played for Fluminense, Friburguense, Rio Ave, Boavista and Campomaiorense.

== Football career ==
Born in Linhares, Espírito Santo, Isaías started his career with Fluminense, where he had an unassuming spell. He then represented Friburguense and Cabofriense, and moved to Portugal in 1987, gradually moving up the ranks: first with Rio Ave then Boavista, arriving at Benfica in 1990.

With Benfica, he quickly became a fan favourite at the Estádio da Luz, being also referred to as a "force of nature" due to his powerful build, stamina and combativeness – he also scored regularly in big games, being the owner of a powerful long-range shot. Arguably his greatest moment with the Lisbon side came on 6 November 1991, in the last round prior to the group stage of the season's European Cup: against Arsenal, at Highbury Park, he assisted once and netted twice in a 3–1 win (4–2 aggregate success). Sporting coach Bobby Robson found him to be the most impressive player in the Portuguese league.

However, Isaías would be left out of the Benfica squad in 1995 by coach Artur Jorge, who was proceeding to a team reshuffle that would result in the darkest period in the club's history – at that time, the veteran was still one of the squad's most influential players and top scorers.

Subsequently, Isaías moved to England with Coventry City for £500.000, signing a two-year contract and becoming the first Brazilian to ever play in the Premier League. He featured in just 14 competitive matches for the Sky Blues over a period of two seasons, due to differences with manager Gordon Strachan and his refusal to cancel his contract after no compensation would be paid. Isaías scored twice during his time for Coventry in games against Chelsea and Middlesbrough.

In 1997, aged nearly 34, Isaías returned to Portugal with Campomaiorense, reaching the final of the Taça de Portugal in 1999. He retired in his country at almost 40 with Cabofriense, then appeared in a few games with the Portuguese beach soccer team courtesy of his previously obtained citizenship.

== Honours ==
Benfica

- Primeira Liga: 1990–91, 1993–94
- Taça de Portugal: 1992–93

Campomaiorense

- Taça de Portugal runner-up: 1998–99
