= Hubert Forstinger =

Austrian football referee (born 1946)

- Born: 2 September 1946 (age 80)

Domestic
Years	League	Role
1985-1994	Bundesliga	Referee

International
Years	League	Role
1987-1995	FIFA-listed	Referee

Hubert Forstinger (born 2 September 1946) is a retired Austrian football referee. He refereed one match in the 1992 UEFA European Football Championship in Sweden that was between France and Denmark.

Forstinger served as a referee during the 1989 FIFA World Youth Championship in Saudi Arabia as well as 1990 and 1994 World Cup qualifiers. He is known to have officiated FIFA matches during the period from 1987 to 1992.
