= 1991–92 European Cup =

European football tournament

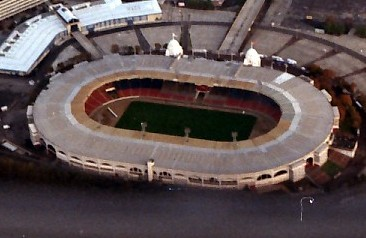
- Wembley Stadium in London hosted the final.

Tournament details
- Dates: 17 September 1991 – 20 May 1992
- Teams: 32

Final positions
- Champions: (Spain) Barcelona (1st title)
- Runners-up: (Italy) Sampdoria

Tournament statistics
- Matches played: 73
- Goals scored: 192 (2.63 per match)
- Attendance: 1,725,387 (23,635 per match)
- Top scorer(s): Sergei Yuran (Benfica); Jean-Pierre Papin (Marseille); 7 goals each

The 1991–92 European Cup was the 37th season of the European Cup football club tournament. It was the first European Cup to have a group stage, from which the winning clubs progressed to the final. 1991–92 was the tournament's last edition before it was re-branded as the UEFA Champions League.

The group stage involved the eight winning clubs from round 2. The clubs were split into two groups of four, playing each other home and away, and the winning club from each group met in the 1992 European Cup Final.

The competition was won for the first time by Barcelona after extra time in the final against Sampdoria, the first victory in the tournament by a team from Spain since 1966. This would mark the first of a total of five European Cup trophies for Barcelona. The winning goal was scored by Ronald Koeman with a free kick.

The defending champions, Red Star Belgrade, did not have an opportunity to play at their own ground because of the Yugoslav Wars, thereby reducing their chances of defending their title. Red Star were eliminated in the group stage by Sampdoria. It was also the final season in which the clubs from that country were able to participate in the primary European football competition since the summer of 1991 Slovenia and Croatia announced their independence. In addition, it was the last time an East German team competed in the European Cup, Hansa Rostock.

English clubs returned to the European Cup, after their five-year ban from European competitions following the Heysel Stadium disaster in 1985. The 1990 Football League champions Liverpool had been unable to participate in the 1990–91 European Cup because they had been banned for an additional sixth year. Arsenal represented England in 1991–92, and reached the second round.

== Teams ==
A total of 32 teams participated in the competition, all entering into the first round. Teams are ordered below by the 1990 UEFA association coefficients.

Qualified teams for 1991–92 European Cup
(Socialist Federal Republic of Yugoslavia) Red Star Belgrade (1st)^{TH}	(Germany) 1. FC Kaiserslautern (1st)	(Italy) Sampdoria (1st)	(Spain) Barcelona (1st)
(Belgium) Anderlecht (1st)	(Portugal) Benfica (1st)	(France) Marseille (1st)	(Soviet Union) Dynamo Kyiv (1st)
(Netherlands) PSV Eindhoven (1st)	(Romania) Universitatea Craiova (1st)	(Scotland) Rangers (1st)	(Sweden) IFK Göteborg (1st)
Austria Wien (1st)	(Germany) Hansa Rostock (1st)	(Switzerland) Grasshopper (1st)	(Czechoslovakia) Sparta Prague (1st)
(Finland) HJK (1st)	(Denmark) Brøndby (1st)	(Bulgaria) Etar Veliko Tarnovo (1st)	(Greece) Panathinaikos (1st)
(Hungary) Kispest Honvéd (1st)	(Poland) Zagłębie Lubin (1st)	(Turkey) Beşiktaş (1st)	(Albania) Flamurtari (1st)
(Norway) Rosenborg (1st)	(Cyprus) Apollon Limassol (1st)	(Northern Ireland) Portadown (1st)	(Iceland) Fram (1st)
(Malta) Hamrun Spartans (1st)	Union Luxembourg (1st)	(Republic of Ireland) Dundalk (1st)	(England) Arsenal (1st)

Associations without a participating team
- Faroe Islands
- Liechtenstein
- San Marino
- Wales

Notes

1. Soviet Union (URS): All matches of Dynamo Kyiv, representing the Football Federation of the Soviet Union as champions of the 1990 Soviet Top League, after the dissolution of the Soviet Union on 26 December show the flag of the Commonwealth of Independent States (CIS).
2. Germany (GER): The original slot allocation of the former West/East Germany still applied. 1. FC Kaiserslautern qualified as champions of the 1990–91 Bundesliga, while Hansa Rostock qualified as champions of the 1990–91 NOFV-Oberliga. Due to the reunification of Germany in October 1990, all flags show Germany instead of East/West Germany. However, Hansa Rostock matches and records were still counted for East Germany, and not for Germany, under UEFA regulations.

== Round and draw dates ==
All draws for the competition were held in Geneva, Switzerland.

Schedule for 1991–92 European Cup
Phase	Round	Draw date	First leg	Second leg
First round		11 July 1991	17–18 September 1991	2 October 1991
Second round		4 October 1991	23 October 1991	6 November 1991
Group stage	Matchday 1	8 November 1991	27 November 1991	
Group stage	Matchday 2	8 November 1991	11–12 December 1991	
Group stage	Matchday 3	8 November 1991	4 March 1992	
Group stage	Matchday 4	8 November 1991	18 March 1992	
Group stage	Matchday 5	8 November 1991	1 April 1992	
Group stage	Matchday 6	8 November 1991	15 April 1992	
Final		8 November 1991	20 May 1992 at Wembley Stadium, London	

== First round ==
The first legs were played on 17 and 18 September, and the second legs on 2 October 1991.

Team 1	Agg.	Team 2	1st leg	2nd leg
Barcelona (Spain)	3–1	(Germany) Hansa Rostock	3–0	0–1
1. FC Kaiserslautern (Germany)	3–1	(Bulgaria) Etar Veliko Tarnovo	2–0	1–1
Union Luxembourg	0–10	(France) Marseille	0–5	0–5
Sparta Prague (Czechoslovakia)	2–2 (a)	(Scotland) Rangers	1–0	1–2 (a.e.t.)
Hamrun Spartans (Malta)	0–10	(Portugal) Benfica	0–6	0–4
Arsenal (England)	6–2	Austria Wien	6–1	0–1
HJK (Finland)	0–4	(Soviet Union) Dynamo Kyiv	0–1	0–3
Brøndby (Denmark)	4–2	(Poland) Zagłębie Lubin	3–0	1–2
Fram (Iceland)	2–2 (a)	(Greece) Panathinaikos	2–2	0–0
IFK Göteborg (Sweden)	1–1 (a)	(Albania) Flamurtari	0–0	1–1
Beşiktaş (Turkey)	2–3	(Netherlands) PSV Eindhoven	1–1	1–2
Anderlecht (Belgium)	4–1	(Switzerland) Grasshopper	1–1	3–0
Red Star Belgrade (Socialist Federal Republic of Yugoslavia)	8–0	(Northern Ireland) Portadown	4–0	4–0
Universitatea Craiova (Romania)	2–3	(Cyprus) Apollon Limassol	2–0	0–3
Kispest Honvéd (Hungary)	3–1	(Republic of Ireland) Dundalk	1–1	2–0
Sampdoria (Italy)	7–1	(Norway) Rosenborg	5–0	2–1

== Second round ==
The first legs were played on 23 October, and the second legs on 6 November 1991.

Team 1	Agg.	Team 2	1st leg	2nd leg
Barcelona (Spain)	3–3 (a)	(Germany) 1. FC Kaiserslautern	2–0	1–3
Marseille (France)	4–4 (a)	(Czechoslovakia) Sparta Prague	3–2	1–2
Benfica (Portugal)	4–2	(England) Arsenal	1–1	3–1 (a.e.t.)
Dynamo Kyiv (Soviet Union)	2–1	(Denmark) Brøndby	1–1	1–0
Panathinaikos (Greece)	4–2	(Sweden) IFK Göteborg	2–0	2–2
PSV Eindhoven (Netherlands)	0–2	(Belgium) Anderlecht	0–0	0–2
Red Star Belgrade (Socialist Federal Republic of Yugoslavia)	5–1	(Cyprus) Apollon Limassol	3–1	2–0
Kispest Honvéd (Hungary)	3–4	(Italy) Sampdoria	2–1	1–3

== Group stage ==
Location of teams of the 1991–92 European Cup group stage.
Blue: Group A; Red: Group B.

=== Group A ===
Pos	Team	Pld	W	D	L	GF	GA	GD	Pts	Qualification	SAM	RSB	AND	PAN
1	(Italy) Sampdoria	6	3	2	1	10	5	+5	8	Advance to final	—	2–0	2–0	1–1
2	(Socialist Federal Republic of Yugoslavia) Red Star Belgrade	6	3	0	3	9	10	−1	6		1–3	—	3–2	1–0
3	(Belgium) Anderlecht	6	2	2	2	8	9	−1	6		3–2	3–2	—	0–0
4	(Greece) Panathinaikos	6	0	4	2	1	4	−3	4		0–0	0–2	0–0	—

Source: UEFA

=== Group B ===
Pos	Team	Pld	W	D	L	GF	GA	GD	Pts	Qualification	BAR	SPP	BEN	DKV
1	(Spain) Barcelona	6	4	1	1	10	4	+6	9	Advance to final	—	3–2	2–1	3–0
2	(Czechoslovakia) Sparta Prague	6	2	2	2	7	7	0	6		1–0	—	1–1	2–1
3	(Portugal) Benfica	6	1	3	2	8	5	+3	5		0–0	1–1	—	5–0
4	(Commonwealth of Independent States) Dynamo Kyiv	6	2	0	4	3	12	−9	4		0–2	1–0	1–0	—

Source: UEFA

== Final ==
The final was played on 20 May 1992 at Wembley Stadium in London, England.

20 May 1992
19:15 UTC+1

Barcelona (Spain)	1–0 (a.e.t.)	(Italy) Sampdoria
Koeman 112'	Report

Wembley Stadium, London
Attendance: 70,827
Referee: Aron Schmidhuber (Germany)

== Top scorers ==
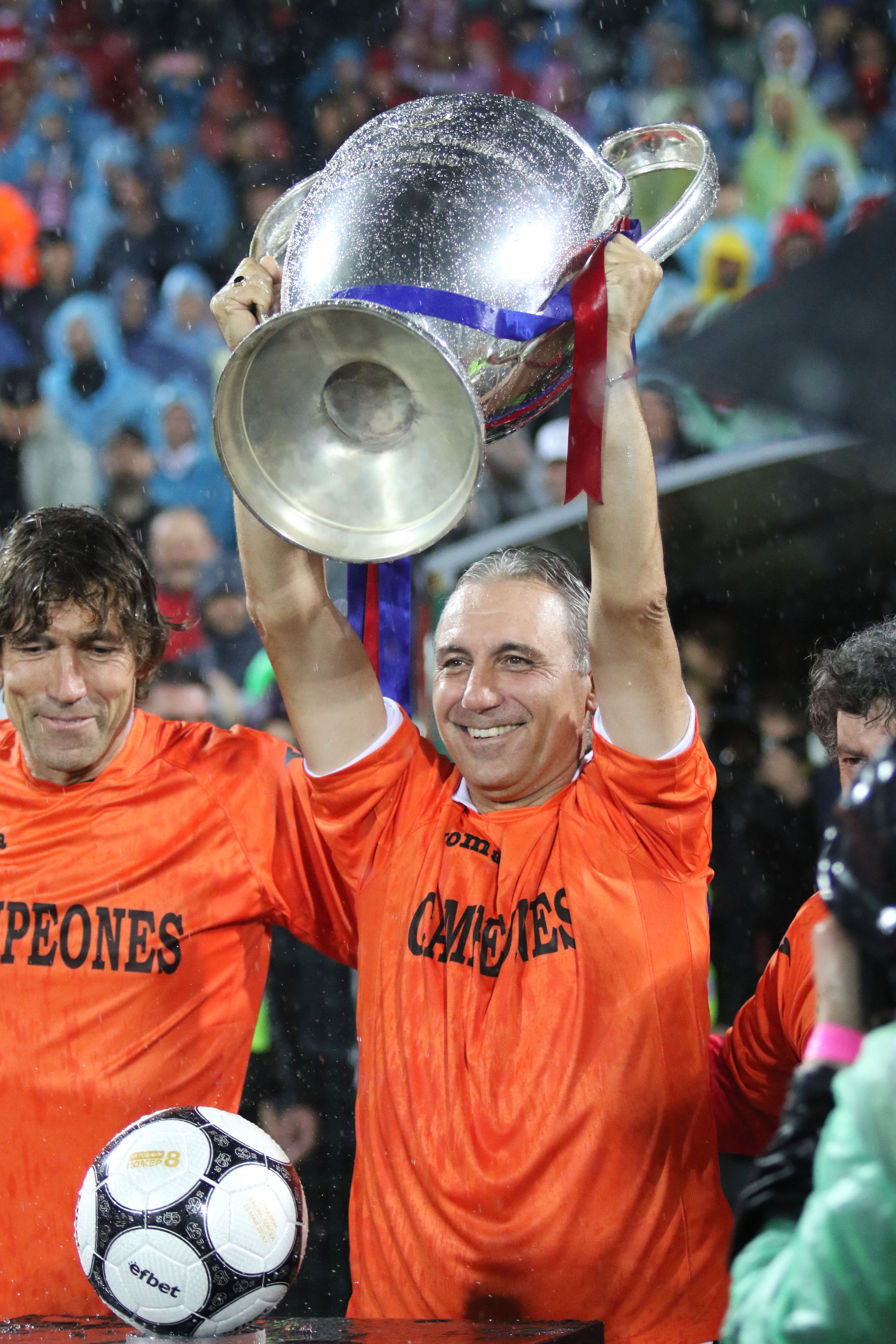
Hristo Stoichkov was part of the Barcelona team that won the competition.

The top scorers from the 1991–92 European Cup are as follows:

Rank	Name	Team	Goals
1	(Commonwealth of Independent States) Sergei Yuran	(Portugal) Benfica	7
1	(France) Jean-Pierre Papin	(France) Marseille	7
3	(Belgium) Luc Nilis	(Belgium) Anderlecht	6
3	(Socialist Federal Republic of Yugoslavia) Darko Pančev	(Socialist Federal Republic of Yugoslavia) Red Star Belgrade	6
3	(Italy) Gianluca Vialli	(Italy) Sampdoria	6
6	(Brazil) Isaías	(Portugal) Benfica	5
7	(Bulgaria) Hristo Stoichkov	(Spain) Barcelona	4
7	(Portugal) César Brito	(Portugal) Benfica	4
7	(Belgium) Marc Degryse	(Belgium) Anderlecht	4
7	(Italy) Attilio Lombardo	(Italy) Sampdoria	4
7	(Italy) Roberto Mancini	(Italy) Sampdoria	4
7	(Socialist Federal Republic of Yugoslavia) Siniša Mihajlović	(Socialist Federal Republic of Yugoslavia) Red Star Belgrade	4
7	(England) Alan Smith	(England) Arsenal	4

== See also ==
- 1991–92 European Cup Winners' Cup
- 1991–92 UEFA Cup
