= 1988–89 Inter Milan season =

Inter Milan
1988–89 season
- President: Ernesto Pellegrini
- Manager: Giovanni Trapattoni
- Stadium: Giuseppe Meazza
- Serie A: 1st (In 1989-90 European Cup)
- Coppa Italia: Group stage
- UEFA Cup: Round of 16
- Top goalscorer: League: Aldo Serena (22); All: Serena (28)
- Average home league attendance: 56,455
Home colours	Away colours

The 1988–89 Inter Milan season was the club's 80th in existence and 73th consecutive season in Serie A, the top flight of Italian football, which they won with 58 points from 34 matches, making Inter Italian champions for the 13th time in the club's history. The club also competed in the 1988–89 Coppa Italia – which they were eliminated from in the group stage – and the 1988–89 UEFA Cup, which they were eliminated from at the round of 16 stage.

== Season ==
After another disappointing season, Inter retained Giovanni Trapattoni and signed German footballers Brehme, a fullback, and Lothar Matthäus, a box-to-box midfielder, to strengthen the club.

Inter targeted Rabah Madjer to be their first choice at centre-forward, however, issues arose during Madjer's physical assessment so the team opted instead to acquire Ramón Díaz. The new attacking partnership of Díaz and Aldo Serena proved to be consistent goal scorers for Inter.

Alessandro Altobelli would depart the team, although Inter's performance was not critically impacted.

On the pitch, Inter was eliminated early from the Coppa Italia, while, in Europe, they were knocked out of the UEFA Cup by Bayern Munich.

Conversely, Inter dominated play in the domestic league, with Inter able to stay unbeaten for almost half of the season. Fiorentina were the first to beat Inter, on matchday 17. Following the defeat, a positive streak made the gap over rivals so large that Inter could celebrate the Scudetto on 28 May, after beating Napoli 2–1. During the last month, with five games to spare, the side had collected 26 wins, six draws and two losses: the final amount was 58 points, a still-unbeaten record for Serie A with 18 teams and two points for a win.

== Squad ==
Note: Flags indicate national team as defined under FIFA eligibility rules; some limited exceptions apply. Players may hold more than one non-FIFA nationality.

Pos.	Nation	Player
GK	ITA	Walter Zenga
GK	ITA	Astutillo Malgioglio
DF	ITA	Giuseppe Bergomi
DF	ITA	Giuseppe Baresi
DF	FRG	Andreas Brehme
DF	ITA	Riccardo Ferri
DF	ITA	Andrea Mandorlini
DF	ITA	Corrado Verdelli
DF	ITA	Romano Galvani
MF	ITA	Salvatore Nobile

Pos.	Nation	Player
MF	FRG	Lothar Matthäus
MF	ITA	Alessandro Bianchi
MF	ITA	Nicola Berti
MF	ITA	Gianfranco Matteoli
MF	ITA	Alberto Rivolta
MF	ITA	Pietro Fanna
FW	ITA	Aldo Serena
FW	ITA	Dario Morello
FW	ITA	Massimo Ciocci
FW	ARG	Ramón Díaz

=== Transfers ===
In
Pos.	Name	from	Type
MF	Lothar Matthäus	Bayern München	
DF	Andreas Brehme	Bayern München	
FW	Ramón Díaz	Fiorentina	loan
MF	Nicola Berti	Fiorentina	
MF	Alessandro Bianchi	Cesena	
DF	Corrado Verdelli	Monza	
MF	Enrico Cucchi	Empoli FC	

Out
Pos.	Name	To	Type
FW	Alessandro Altobelli	Juventus	
MF	Vincenzo Scifo	Bordeaux	co-ownership
DF	Daniel Passarella	River Plate	
MF	Enrico Cucchi	Fiorentina	loan
MF	Pierluigi Di Già	Parma	co-ownership
MF	Adriano Piraccini	Cesena	
MF	Giuseppe Minaudo	Udinese	definitivo
MF	Fausto Pizzi	Vicenza	co-ownership renewed

==== Winter ====
In
Pos.	Name	from	Type
DF	Alberto Rivolta	Parma	
MF	Romano Galvani	Bologna FC	loan

Out
Pos.	Name	to	Type
GK	Claudio Bozzini	Celano	loan
DF	Salvatore Nobile	Lecce	
FW	Massimo Ciocci	Padova	loan

== Competitions ==
=== Serie A ===
==== League table ====
Pos	Team	Pld	W	D	L	GF	GA	GD	Pts	Qualification or relegation
1	Internazionale (C)	34	26	6	2	67	19	+48	58	Qualification to European Cup
2	Napoli	34	18	11	5	57	28	+29	47	Qualification to UEFA Cup
3	Milan (Note: Milan qualified for the 1989–90 European Cup as the 1988–89 European Cup defending champions.)	34	16	14	4	61	25	+36	46	Qualification to European Cup
4	Juventus	34	15	13	6	51	36	+15	43	Qualification to UEFA Cup
5	Sampdoria	34	14	11	9	43	25	+18	39	Qualification to Cup Winners' Cup

Source: 1988–89 Serie A, RSSSF.com
Rules for classification: 1) Points; 2) Head-to-head points; 3) Head-to-head goal difference; 4) Goal difference; 5) Goals scored; 6) Draw.
(C) Champions

==== Results by round ====
Round	1	2	3	4	5	6	7	8	9	10	11	12	13	14	15	16	17	18	19	20	21	22	23	24	25	26	27	28	29	30	31	32	33	34
Ground	A	H	A	H	H	A	H	A	A	H	A	H	A	H	A	H	A	H	A	H	A	A	H	A	H	H	A	H	A	H	A	H	A	H
Result	W	W	D	W	W	W	W	W	W	D	W	W	D	W	D	W	L	W	W	W	W	W	W	W	W	D	D	W	W	W	W	W	L	W
Position	3	2	2	1	1	1	1	1	1	1	1	1	1	1	1	1	1	1	1	1	1	1	1	1	1	1	1	1	1	1	1	1	1	1

Source: Competitive matches
A = Away; H = Home; W = Win; D = Draw; L = Loss; = 1989–90 European Cup; = 1989–90 UEFA Cup

==== Matches ====
9 October 1988 1	Ascoli	1–3	Inter	Ascoli Piceno
	Giovannelli 56' (pen.)	Report	Mandorlini 4'; Serena 73' (pen.), 82'	Stadium: Cino e Lillo Del Duca

16 October 1988 2	Inter	4–1	Pisa	Milan
	Brehme 52'; Díaz 75'; Serena 84'; Matthäus 88'	Report	Bernazzini 29'	Stadium: Giuseppe Meazza

23 October 1988 3	Verona	0–0	Inter	Verona
		Report		Stadium: Marcantonio Bentegodi

30 October 1988 4	Inter	2–0	Roma	Milan
	Berti 19'; Serena 84'	Report		Stadium: Giuseppe Meazza

6 November 1988 5	Inter	1–0	Sampdoria	Milan
	Berti 1'	Report		Stadium: Giuseppe Meazza

20 November 1988 6	Como	1–2	Inter	Como
	Giunta 60'	Report	Díaz 41'; Serena 83'	Stadium: Giuseppe Sinigaglia

27 November 1988 7	Inter	1–0	Cesena	Milan
	Matteoli 1'	Report		Stadium: Giuseppe Meazza

4 December 1988 8	Pescara	0–2	Inter	Pescara
		Report	Júnior 55' (o.g.); Matthäus 80'	Stadium: Adriatico

11 December 1988 9	Milan	0–1	Inter	Milan
		Report	Serena 26'	Stadium: San Siro

18 December 1988 10	Inter	1–1	Juventus	Milan
	Serena 20'	Report	Galia 54'	Stadium: Giuseppe Meazza

31 December 1988 11	Lecce	0–3	Inter	Lecce
		Report	Díaz 70'; Brehme 78'; Berti 82'	Stadium: Via del Mare

8 January 1989 12	Inter	1–0	Bologna	Milan
	Serena 72'	Report		Stadium: Giuseppe Meazza

15 January 1989 13	Napoli	0–0	Inter	Naples
		Report		Stadium: San Paolo

22 January 1989 14	Inter	1–0	Lazio	Milan
	Mandorlini 40'	Report		Stadium: Giuseppe Meazza

29 January 1989 15	Atalanta	1–1	Inter	Bergamo
	Evair 61'	Report	Fortunato 50' (o.g.)	Stadium: Comunale

5 February 1989 16	Inter	2–0	Torino	Milan
	Serena 3'; Brambati 19' (o.g.)	Report		Stadium: Giuseppe Meazza

12 February 1989 17	Fiorentina	4–3	Inter	Florence
	Baggio 33'; Cucchi 52'; Borgonovo 73', 85'	Report	Matthäus 13' (pen.); Serena 55', 57'	Stadium: Comunale

19 February 1989 18	Inter	3–1	Ascoli	Milan
	Berti 13'; Serena 27'; Díaz 69'	Report	Giordano 77'	Stadium: Giuseppe Meazza

26 February 1989 19	Pisa	0–3	Inter	Pisa
		Report	Díaz 36'; Serena 39', 51'	Stadium: Arena Garibaldi

5 March 1989 20	Inter	1–0	Verona	Milan
	Berti 56'	Report		Stadium: Giuseppe Meazza

12 March 1989 21	Roma	0–3	Inter	Rome
		Report	Matthäus 12'; Serena 22'; Díaz 75'	Stadium: Olimpico

19 March 1989 22	Sampdoria	0–1	Inter	Genoa
		Report	Mandorlini 43'	Stadium: Luigi Ferraris

2 April 1989 23	Inter	4–0	Como	Milan
	Berti 2'; Matthäus 71' (pen.), 77'; Bianchi 78'	Report		Stadium: Giuseppe Meazza

9 April 1989 24	Cesena	1–2	Inter	Cesena
	Gelain 78'	Report	Bianchi 11'; Bordin 49' (o.g.)

16 April 1989 25	Inter	2–1	Pescara	Milan
	Berti 20'; Serena 27'	Report	Pagano 84'	Stadium: Giuseppe Meazza

30 April 1989 26	Inter	0–0	Milan	Milan
		Report		Stadium: Giuseppe Meazza

7 May 1989 27	Juventus	1–1	Inter	Turin
	Rui Barros 29'	Report	Serena 55'	Stadium: Comunale

14 May 1989 28	Inter	2–0	Lecce	Milan
	Díaz 23'; Serena 33'	Report		Stadium: Giuseppe Meazza

21 May 1989 29	Bologna	0–6	Inter	Bologna
		Report	Matthäus 31' (pen.); Díaz 54', 67'; Serena 64', 83'; Matteoli 86'	Stadium: Renato Dall'Ara

28 May 1989 30	Inter	2–1	Napoli	Milan
	Fusi 49' (o.g.); Matthäus 83'	Report	Careca 36'	Stadium: Giuseppe Meazza

4 June 1989 31	Lazio	1–3	Inter	Rome
	Dezotti 53'	Report	Bergomi 68'; Díaz 79', 84'	Stadium: Olimpico

11 June 1989 32	Inter	4–2	Atalanta	Milan
	Matthäus 49' (pen.); Serena 59', 65' (pen.); Brehme 87'	Report	Nicolini 5'; Madonna 60'	Stadium: Giuseppe Meazza

18 June 1989 33	Torino	2–0	Inter	Turin
	Škoro 54'; Müller 73'	Report		Stadium: Comunale

25 June 1989 34	Inter	2–0	Fiorentina	Milan
	Díaz 61'; Bianchi 76'	Report		Stadium: Giuseppe Meazza

=== Coppa Italia ===
First round

21 August 1988 1	Parma	1–2	Inter	Parma
	Di Nicola 89'		78' (pen.) Matthäus; 84' Morello	Stadium: Ennio Tardini; Referee: Sguizzato

24 August 1988 2	Inter	1–0	Monopoli	Varese
	Serena 80'			Stadium: Franco Ossola; Referee: Di Cola

28 August 1988 3	Ascoli	0–0	Inter	Ascoli Piceno
				Stadium: Stadio Cino e Lillo Del Duca; Referee: Longhi

31 August 1988 4	Inter	3–0	Reggina	Varese
	Serena 23', 43'; Ciocci 72'			Stadium: Franco Ossola; Referee: Felicani

3 September 1988 5	Brescia Calcio	2–0	Inter	Brescia
	Cecconi 24'; Corini 75'			Stadium: Mario Rigamonti; Referee: Luci

Second round

14 September 1988 1	Udinese	1–1	Inter	Udine
	De Vitis 15' (pen.)		40' (pen.) Díaz	Stadium: Friuli; Referee: Cornieti

21 September 1988 2	Lazio	1–1	Inter	Rome
	Dezotti 1'		6' Bianchi	Stadium: Olimpico; Referee: Agnolin

28 September 1988 3	Inter	3–4	Fiorentina	Piacenza
	Matthäus 20' (pen.), 83'; Morello 68'		28' Borgonovo; 29', 52' (pen.) Baggio I 67' Mattei	Stadium: Galleana; Referee: Baldas

=== Coppa UEFA ===
==== First round ====
7 September 1988	Inter (Italy)	2–1	(Sweden) IK Brage	Milan
	Díaz 45' (pen.); Matteoli 89'		65' (pen.) Arnberg	Stadium: Giuseppe Meazza; Referee: (Romania) Crăciunescu

5 October 1988	IK Brage (Sweden)	1–2	(Italy) Inter	Borlänge
	Hällman 45'		10' Berti; 77' Morello	Stadium: Domnarvsvallen; Referee: (West Germany) Scheurell

==== Second round ====
26 October 1988	Malmö FF (Sweden)	0–1	(Italy) Inter	Malmö
			82' Serena	Stadium: Malmö Stadion; Referee: (Czechoslovakia) Stiegler

9 November 1988	Inter (Italy)	1–1	(Sweden) Malmö FF	Milan
	Díaz 12'		66' Nilsson	Stadium: Stadio Giuseppe Meazza; Referee: (France) Bouillet

==== Eightfinals ====
23 November 1988	Bayern München (West Germany)	0–2	(Italy) Inter	München
			60' Serena; 71' Berti	Stadium: Olympiastadion; Referee: (Belgium) Ponnet

7 December 1988	Inter (Italy)	1–3 (3–3a agg.)	(West Germany) Bayern München	Milan
	Serena 45'		33' Wohlfarth; 38' Augenthaler; 40' Wegmann	Stadium: Giuseppe Meazza; Referee: (Czechoslovakia) Galler

== Statistics ==
=== Players statistics ===
No.	Pos	Nat	Player	Total		Serie A		Coppa		UEFA	
No.	Pos	Nat	Player	Apps	Goals	Apps	Goals	Apps	Goals	Apps	Goals
	GK	(Italy) ITA	Zenga	43	-31	33	-19	5	-7	5	-5
	DF	(Italy) ITA	Bergomi	46	1	32	1	8	0	6	0
	DF	(Italy) ITA	Ferri	45	0	31	0	8	0	6	0
	DF	(Italy) ITA	Mandorlini	38	3	26	3	8	0	4	0
	DF	(West Germany) FRG	Brehme	44	3	31	3	7	0	6	0
	MF	(Italy) ITA	Bianchi	45	4	26+5	3	8	1	6	0
	MF	(West Germany) FRG	Matthäus	44	12	32	9	7	3	5	0
	MF	(Italy) ITA	Matteoli	45	3	31+1	2	8	0	5	1
	MF	(Italy) ITA	Berti	44	9	32	7	6	0	6	2
	FW	(Italy) ITA	Serena	42	28	32	22	5	3	5	3
	FW	(Argentina) ARG	Diaz	43	15	33	12	7	1	3	2
	GK	(Italy) ITA	Malgioglio	6	-3	1	0	3	-2	2	-1
	DF	(Italy) ITA	Baresi	45	0	13+19	0	8	0	5	0
	DF	(Italy) ITA	Verdelli	23	0	13+7	0	1	0	2	0
	MF	(Italy) ITA	Fanna	13	0	7+6	0				
	DF	(Italy) ITA	Galvani	3	0	1+2	0				
	MF	(Italy) ITA	Nobile	7	0	0	0	7	0		
	MF	(Italy) ITA	Rivolta	1	0	0+1	0				
	FW	(Italy) ITA	Morello	17	3	0+10	0	4	2	3	1
	FW	(Italy) ITA	Ciocci	9	1	0	0	8	1	1	0
	FW	(Italy) ITA	P. D. Rocco	6	0	0+1	0	3	0	2	0

- Source: http://calcio-seriea.net/presenze/1988/963/

== Sources ==
- RSSSF - Italy 1988/89
