= 1989–90 Inter Milan season =

Internazionale
1989–90 season
- Chairman: Ernesto Pellegrini
- Manager: Giovanni Trapattoni
- Stadium: Giuseppe Meazza
- Serie A: 3rd (In 1990–91 UEFA Cup)
- Coppa Italia: Group stage
- European Cup: Round of 32
- Supercoppa Italiana: Winners
- Top goalscorer: League: Jürgen Klinsmann (13); All: Klinsmann (15)
Home colours	Away colours

The 1989–90 Inter Milan season was the club's 81st in existence and 74th consecutive season in Serie A, the top flight of Italian football, in which they finished 3rd. The club also competed in the 1989–90 Coppa Italia, and were eliminated in the group stage, and the 1989–90 European Cup, which they eliminated from in the round of 32.

As reigning Serie A champions, Inter Milan also played in the 1989 Supercoppa Italiana, which they won, beating Sampdoria 2–0.

== Season ==
The reigning champions of Internazionale changed his centre-forward, Ramón Díaz, with Jürgen Klinsmann: in German league, he had scored at least 15 goals for season since 1985. In fact, he soon proved his skills scoring twice in Coppa Italia. However, the long-awaited European campaign expired out in the first round: Malmö, champions of Sweden, beaten Inter for 1–0 and then equalized 1–1 in Milan, defeating Trapattoni's side.

Despite the conquest of domestic supercup, Internazionale was not able to solve the problem of partnership between Klinsmann and Aldo Serena: they also were not strong enough for Milan and Napoli, finishing the league with only a third place.

== Squad ==
Note: Flags indicate national team as defined under FIFA eligibility rules; some limited exceptions apply. Players may hold more than one non-FIFA nationality.

Pos.	Nation	Player
GK	ITA	Walter Zenga
GK	ITA	Astutillo Malgioglio
DF	ITA	Gabriele Baraldi
DF	ITA	Giuseppe Bergomi
DF	FRG	Andreas Brehme
DF	ITA	Riccardo Ferri
DF	ITA	Alberto Rivolta
DF	ITA	Stefano Rossini
DF	ITA	Corrado Verdelli
DF	ITA	Paolo Tramezzani
MF	ITA	Giuseppe Baresi
MF	ITA	Nicola Berti

Pos.	Nation	Player
MF	ITA	Alessandro Bianchi
MF	ITA	Enrico Cucchi
MF	ITA	Pierluigi Di Già
MF	ITA	Andrea Mandorlini
MF	ITA	Gianfranco Matteoli
MF	FRG	Lothar Matthäus
MF	ITA	Fabio Tricario
MF	ITA	Cristiano Scapolo
FW	ITA	Dario Morello
FW	FRG	Jürgen Klinsmann
FW	ITA	Aldo Serena

=== Transfers ===
In
Pos.	Name	from	Type
FW	Jürgen Klinsmann	VfB Stuttgart	
DF	Stefano Rossini	Parma	
MF	Pierluigi Di Già	Parma	
DF	Stefano Bettarini	Staggia Senese	
MF	Marco Barollo	Villa Calcio	
MF	Giacomo Biagi	Staggia Senese	
MF	Enrico Cucchi	Fiorentina	loan ended
MF	Fausto Pizzi	Vicenza	
MF	Vincenzo Scifo	Bordeaux	
FW	Massimo Ciocci	Padova	loan ended

Out
Pos.	Name	To	Type
FW	Ramón Díaz	Fiorentina	loan ended
MF	Vincenzo Scifo	AJ Auxerre	co-ownership
MF	Pietro Fanna	Hellas Verona	
MF	Fausto Pizzi	Parma	co-ownership

==== Winter ====
In
Pos.	Name	from	Type

Out
Pos.	Name	to	Type
DF	Paolo Tramezzani	Prato	loan
MF	Fabio Tricarico	Castel di Sangro	loan
MF	Alberto Rivolta	Livorno	

== Competitions ==
=== Serie A ===
==== League table ====
Pos	Team	Pld	W	D	L	GF	GA	GD	Pts	Qualification or relegation
1	Napoli (C)	34	21	9	4	57	31	+26	51	Qualification to European Cup
2	Milan (Note: Milan qualified for the 1990–91 European Cup as defending champions.)	34	22	5	7	56	27	+29	49	Qualification to European Cup
3	Internazionale	34	17	10	7	55	32	+23	44	Qualification to UEFA Cup
4	Juventus	34	15	14	5	56	36	+20	44	Qualification to Cup Winners' Cup
5	Sampdoria (Note: Sampdoria qualified for the 1990–91 European Cup Winners' Cup as defending champions.)	34	16	11	7	46	26	+20	43	Qualification to Cup Winners' Cup

Source: 1989–90 Serie A, RSSSF.com
Rules for classification: 1) Points; 2) Head-to-head points; 3) Head-to-head goal difference; 4) Goal difference; 5) Goals scored; 6) Draw.
(C) Champions

==== Results by round ====
Round	1	2	3	4	5	6	7	8	9	10	11	12	13	14	15	16	17	18	19	20	21	22	23	24	25	26	27	28	29	30	31	32	33	34	35
Ground	H	A	H	A	H	A	H	H	A	H	A	H	A	A	H	A	H	A	H	A	H	A	H	A	A	H	A	H	A	H	H	A	H	A	A
Result	W	D	W	L	W	W	W	D	L	W	W	L	L	W	W	D	W	W	W	D	W	L	D	D	D	W	L	D	W	W	D	-	W	D	L
Position	1	2	1	5	3	3	2	2	2	2	2	2	3	2	2	2	2	2	2	2	2	3	3	3	3	3	3	4	3	3	3	3	3	3	3

Source: Competitive matches
A = Away; H = Home; W = Win; D = Draw; L = Loss; = 1990–91 European Cup; = 1990–91 UEFA Cup; = Relegation to 1990–91 Serie B

==== Matches ====
27 August 1989 1	Inter	2–1	Cremonese	Milan
	Gualco 63' (o.g.); Brehme 87' (pen.)	Report	Dezotti 82'	Stadium: Giuseppe Meazza; Attendance: 50 701; Referee: Fabricatore

3 September 1989 2	Bologna	2–2	Inter	Bologna
	Giordano 28', 57' (pen.)	Report	Klinsmann 38'; Mandorlini 67'	Stadium: Stadio Dall'Ara; Attendance: 36 568; Referee: Lo Bello

6 September 1989 3	Inter	2–1	Lecce	Milan
	Klinsmann 34'; Brehme 72' (pen.)	Report	Pasculli 30'	Stadium: Giuseppe Meazza; Attendance: 56 583; Referee: Felicani

10 September 1989 4	Sampdoria	2–0	Inter	Genoa
	Vialli 33'; Cerezo 70'	Report		Stadium: Luigi Ferraris; Attendance: 25 128; Referee: Agnolin

17 September 1989 5	Inter	2–1	Juventus	Milan
	Matthäus 36'; Klinsmann 46'	Report	Marocchi 58'	Stadium: Giuseppe Meazza; Attendance: 64 131; Referee: D'Elia

24 September 1989 6	Ascoli	0–1	Inter	Ascoli Piceno
		Report	Klinsmann 3'	Stadium: Cino e Lillo Del Duca; Attendance: 19 579; Referee: Pairetto

1 October 1989 7	Inter	3–0	Roma	Milan
	Matthäus 27'; Brehme 38'; Matthäus 58'	Report		Stadium: Giuseppe Meazza; Attendance: 48 399; Referee: Lo Bello

8 October 1989 8	Inter	1–1	Bari	Milan
	Berti 49'	Report	Carbone 40'	Stadium: Giuseppe Meazza; Attendance: 48 728; Referee: Sguizzato

22 October 1989 9	Napoli	2–0	Inter	Naples
	Careca 75'; Maradona 84'	Report		Stadium: San Paolo; Attendance: 73 641; Referee: Longhi

29 October 1989 10	Inter	3–0	Lazio	Milan
	Morello 39'; Brehme 52' (pen.); Serena 67'	Report		Stadium: Giuseppe Meazza; Attendance: 42 823; Referee: Pezzella

5 November 1989 11	Hellas Verona	0–3	Inter	Verona
		Report	Klinsmann 35'; Klinsmann 38'; Klinsmann 88'	Stadium: Marcantonio Bentegodi; Attendance: 26 530; Referee: D'Elia

19 November 1989 12	Inter	0–3	Milan	Milan
		Report	van Basten 52'; Fuser 75'; Massaro 86'	Stadium: Giuseppe Meazza; Attendance: 66 309; Referee: Pairetto

26 November 1989 13	Atalanta	2–1	Inter	Bergamo
	Evair 39'; Madonna 85'	Report	45' Berti	Stadium: Comunale; Attendance: 29680; Referee: Agnolin

3 December 1989 14	Cesena	2–3	Inter	Cesena
	Agostini 10', 59' (pen.)	Report	32' Matteoli; 38' (pen.) Brehme; 47' Serena	Stadium: Stadio Dino Manuzzi; Attendance: 23231; Referee: Lo Bello

10 December 1989 15	Inter	1–0	Genoa	Milan
	Serena 63'	Report		Stadium: Giuseppe Meazza; Attendance: 45273; Referee: Pezzella

17 December 1989 16	Fiorentina	2–2	Inter	Florence
	Baggio 45' (pen.); Dell'Oglio 62'	Report	50', 60' (pen.) Serena	Stadium: Comunale; Attendance: 24538; Referee: Lanese

30 December 1989 17	Inter	2–0	Udinese	Milan
	Matthäus 27'; Klinsmann 78'	Report		Stadium: Giuseppe Meazza; Attendance: 44075; Referee: Stafoggia

7 January 1990 18	Cremonese	0–1	Inter	Cremona
		Report	53' Berti	Stadium: Giovanni Zini; Attendance: 17973; Referee: Longhi

14 January 1990 19	Inter	3–0	Bologna	Milan
	Matthäus 4', 14' (pen.); Klinsmann 16'	Report		Stadium: Giuseppe Meazza; Attendance: 48151; Referee: Agnolin

17 January 1990 20	Lecce	0–0	Inter	Lecce
		Report		Stadium: Via del Mare; Attendance: 34860; Referee: Lo Bello

21 January 1990 21	Inter	2–0	Sampdoria	Milan
	Matthäus 31', 41'	Report		Stadium: Giuseppe Meazza; Attendance: 52777; Referee: D'Elia

28 January 1990 22	Juventus	1–0	Inter	Turin
	Napoli 71'	Report		Stadium: Comunale; Attendance: 47 402; Referee: Agnolin

4 February 1990 23	Inter	0–0	Ascoli	Milan
		Report		Stadium: Giuseppe Meazza; Attendance: 40017; Referee: Dal Forno

11 February 1990 24	Roma	1–1	Inter	Rome
	Tempestilli 50'	Report	Klinsmann 10'	Stadium: Stadio Flaminio; Attendance: 24701; Referee: Lo Bello

18 February 1990 25	Bari	0–0	Inter	Bari
		Report		Stadium: Stadio della Vittoria; Attendance: 31051; Referee: Longhi

25 February 1990 26	Inter	3–1	Napoli	Milan
	Ferrara 49' (o.g.); Klinsmann 53'; Bianchi 58'	Report	Careca 7'	Stadium: Giuseppe Meazza; Attendance: 60652; Referee: Agnolin

4 March 1990 27	Lazio	2–1	Inter	Rome
	Sosa 11' (pen.); Pin 50'	Report	43' Mandorlini	Stadium: Flaminio; Attendance: 23142; Referee: Lanese

11 March 1990 28	Inter	0–0	Hellas Verona	Milan
		Report		Stadium: Giuseppe Meazza; Attendance: 46291; Referee: Fabricatore

18 March 1990 29	Milan	1–3	Inter	Milan
	Costacurta 84'	Report	Serena 3', 90'; Matthäus 24'	Stadium: San Siro; Attendance: 62447; Referee: Pairetto

25 March 1990 30	Inter	7–2	Atalanta	Milan
	Bergomi 6'; Matthäus 9'; Baresi 24'; Berti 27'; Serena 59'; Klinsmann 63', 70' (pen.)	Report	46' (o.g.) Ferri; 73' Nicolini	Stadium: Giuseppe Meazza; Attendance: 50 393; Referee: Felicani

8 April 1990 31	Inter	1–1	Cesena	Milan
	Brehme 66'	Report	80' (o.g.) Bergomi	Stadium: Giuseppe Meazza; Attendance: 45 071; Referee: Pezzella

22 April 1990 33	Inter	2–0	Fiorentina	Milan
	Berti 23'; Bergomi 65'	Report		Stadium: Giuseppe Meazza; Attendance: 45 195; Referee: Coppetelli

25 April 1990 32	Genoa	0–0	Inter	Genoa
20:30		Report		Stadium: Luigi Ferraris; Attendance: 25 300; Referee: Fabricatore

29 April 1990 34	Udinese	4–3	Inter	Udine
	Balvo 5', 60'; Branca 15', 90'	Report	Serena 18'; Matthäus 71'; 79' Mandorlini	Stadium: Friuli; Attendance: 28 862; Referee: Agnolin

=== Coppa Italia ===
First round

23 August 1989	Inter	1–0	Spezia	Monza
	Klinsmann 83'			Stadium: Brianteo; Referee: Dal Forno

Eightfinals

30 August 1989	Cosenza	0–2	Inter	Cosenza
			95' Morello; 119' Klinsmann	Stadium: San Vito; Referee: Pezzella

Group phase- Group B

10 January 1990	Ascoli	2–1	Inter	Ascoli Piceno
	Cvetkovic 61'; Giovannelli 73'		77' Matthäus	Stadium: Stadio Cino e Lillo Del Duca; Referee: Pezzella

24 January 1990	Inter	3–1	Roma	Milan
	Serena 25', 68'; Matthäus 80' (pen.)		60' Di Mauro	Stadium: Giuseppe Meazza; Referee: Amendolia

=== European Cup ===
First round

13 September 1989	(Sweden) Malmö FF	1–0	Inter	Malmö
	Lindman 74'			Stadium: Malmö Stadion; Referee: (France) Bouillet

27 September 1989	Inter	1–1 (1–2 agg.)	(Sweden) Malmö FF	Milan
	Serena 69'		81' Engqvist	Stadium: Giuseppe Meazza; Referee: (West Germany) Kirschen

=== Supercoppa Italiana ===
29 November 1989	Inter	2–0	Sampdoria	Milan
	Cucchi 37'; Serena 86'			Stadium: Giuseppe Meazza; Referee: Longhi

== Statistics ==
=== Player statistics ===
No.	Pos	Nat	Player	Total		Serie A		Coppa		European Cup	
No.	Pos	Nat	Player	Apps	Goals	Apps	Goals	Apps	Goals	Apps	Goals
	GK	(Italy) ITA	Zenga	37	-31	31	-26	4	-3	2	-2
	DF	(Italy) ITA	Bergomi	38	2	32	2	4	0	2	0
	DF	(Italy) ITA	Mandorlini	29	3	24	3	3	0	2	0
	DF	(Italy) ITA	Verdelli	31	0	21+6	0	3	0	1	0
	DF	(West Germany) FRG	Brehme	38	6	32	6	4	0	2	0
	MF	(Italy) ITA	Bianchi	35	1	29+1	1	3	0	2	0
	MF	(West Germany) FRG	Matthäus	30	13	25	11	3	2	2	0
	MF	(Italy) ITA	Matteoli	38	1	33	1	3	0	2	0
	MF	(Italy) ITA	Berti	34	5	29	5	4	0	1	0
	FW	(West Germany) FRG	Klinsmann	37	15	31	13	4	2	2	0
	FW	(Italy) ITA	Serena	35	12	30	9	3	2	2	1
	GK	(Italy) ITA	Malgioglio	6	-8	3+1	-6	0	-0	2	-2
	DF	(Italy) ITA	Ferri	24	0	19+1	0	2	0	2	0
	MF	(Italy) ITA	Cucchi	22	0	12+7	0	2	0	1	0
	DF	(Italy) ITA	Baresi	20	1	10+7	1	3	0	0	0
	FW	(Italy) ITA	Morello	27	2	8+13	1	5	1	1	0
	DF	(Italy) ITA	Rossini	16	0	3+11	0	2	0	0	0
	MF	(Italy) ITA	Di Già	11	0	1+10	0	0	0	0	0
	MF	(Italy) ITA	Scapolo	1	0	0+1	0				
	DF	(Italy) ITA	Rivolta								

- Source: http://calcio-seriea.net/presenze/1989/990/

== Sources ==
- - RSSSF - Italy Championship 1989/90
