= 1991 UEFA Cup final =

- Event: 1990–91 UEFA Cup
Inter Milan	Roma
(Italy)	(Italy)
2	1
- on aggregate

First leg
Inter Milan	Roma
2	0
- Date: 8 May 1991
- Venue: San Siro, Milan
- Referee: Alexey Spirin (Soviet Union)
- Attendance: 68,887

Second leg
Roma	Inter Milan
1	0
- Date: 22 May 1991
- Venue: Stadio Olimpico, Rome
- Referee: Joël Quiniou (France)
- Attendance: 70,901

The 1991 UEFA Cup final was a football tie played on 8 May 1991 and 22 May 1991 to determine the champion of the 1990–91 UEFA Cup. It was contested across two legs between Italian sides Inter Milan and Roma. Inter won 2–1 on aggregate after winning the first leg 2–0 but losing the second 1–0.

== Route to the final ==
Inter Milan				Round	Roma			
Opponent	Agg.	1st leg	2nd leg		Opponent	Agg.	1st leg	2nd leg
(Austria) Rapid Wien	4–3 (a.e.t.)	1–2 (A)	3–1 (a.e.t.) (H)	First round	(Portugal) Benfica	2–0	1–0 (H)	1–0 (A)
(England) Aston Villa	3–2	0–2 (A)	3–0 (H)	Second round	(Spain) Valencia	3–2	1–1 (A)	2–1 (H)
(Socialist Federal Republic of Yugoslavia) Partizan	4–1	3–0 (H)	1–1 (A)	Third round	(France) Girondins de Bordeaux	7–0	5–0 (H)	2–0 (A)
(Italy) Atalanta	2–0	0–0 (A)	2–0 (H)	Quarter-finals	(Belgium) Anderlecht	6–2	3–0 (H)	3–2 (A)
(Portugal) Sporting CP	2–0	0–0 (A)	2–0 (H)	Semi-finals	(Denmark) Brøndby IF	2–1	0–0 (A)	2–1 (H)

== Match details ==
=== First leg ===
8 May 1991

Inter Milan (Italy)	2–0	(Italy) Roma
Matthäus 55' (pen.); Berti 67'	Report Overview (archive) Overview

San Siro, Milan
Attendance: 68,887
Referee: Alexey Spirin (Soviet Union)

Inter Milan	Roma

GK	1	(Italy) Walter Zenga
CB	2	(Italy) Giuseppe Bergomi (c)
LM	3	(Germany) Andreas Brehme
CM	4	(Italy) Nicola Berti
CB	5	(Italy) Riccardo Ferri
DM	6	(Italy) Sergio Battistini
RM	7	(Italy) Alessandro Bianchi
CB	8	(Italy) Antonio Paganin	(substituted off) 65'
LF	9	(Germany) Jürgen Klinsmann
CM	10	(Germany) Lothar Matthäus
RF	11	(Italy) Aldo Serena	(substituted off) 90'
Substitutes:
GK	12	(Italy) Astutillo Malgioglio
CB	13	(Italy) Andrea Mandorlini
CB	14	(Italy) Giuseppe Baresi	(substituted on) 65'
MF	15	(Italy) Paolo Stringara
FW	16	(Italy) Fausto Pizzi	(substituted on) 90'
Manager:
(Italy) Giovanni Trapattoni

GK	1	(Italy) Giovanni Cervone
CB	2	(Germany) Thomas Berthold
CB	3	(Italy) Antonio Tempestilli
LM	4	(Italy) Sebastiano Nela
CB	5	(Brazil) Aldair	(substituted off) 72'
SW	6	(Italy) Antonio Comi	(substituted off) 75'
RM	7	(Italy) Manuel Gerolin
CM	8	(Italy) Fabrizio Di Mauro
CF	9	(Germany) Rudi Völler
AM	10	(Italy) Giuseppe Giannini (c)
CF	11	(Italy) Ruggiero Rizzitelli
Substitutes:
GK	12	(Italy) Giuseppe Zinetti
DF	13	(Italy) Amedeo Carboni	(substituted on) 72'
DF	14	(Italy) Stefano Pellegrini
MF	15	(Italy) Fausto Salsano
DF	16	(Italy) Roberto Muzzi	(substituted on) 75'
Manager:
(Italy) Ottavio Bianchi

=== Second leg ===
22 May 1991

Roma (Italy)	1–0	(Italy) Inter Milan
Rizzitelli 81'	Report Overview (archive) Overview

Stadio Olimpico, Rome
Attendance: 70,901
Referee: Joël Quiniou (France)

Roma	Inter Milan

GK	1	(Italy) Giovanni Cervone
DF	2	(Germany) Thomas Berthold
DF	4	(Italy) Sebastiano Nela
DF	5	(Brazil) Aldair
DF	3	(Italy) Antonio Tempestilli	(substituted off) 57'
MF	6	(Italy) Stefano Desideri	(substituted off) 69'
MF	7	(Italy) Manuel Gerolin
MF	10	(Italy) Giuseppe Giannini (c)
MF	8	(Italy) Fabrizio Di Mauro
FW	11	(Italy) Ruggiero Rizzitelli
FW	9	(Germany) Rudi Völler
Substitutes:
GK	12	(Italy) Giuseppe Zinetti
DF	13	(Italy) Stefano Pellegrini
MF	14	(Italy) Giovanni Piacentini
MF	15	(Italy) Fausto Salsano		(substituted on) 57'
DF	16	(Italy) Roberto Muzzi		(substituted on) 69'
Manager:
(Italy) Ottavio Bianchi

GK	1	(Italy) Walter Zenga
DF	2	(Italy) Giuseppe Bergomi (c)
DF	6	(Italy) Sergio Battistini
DF	5	(Italy) Riccardo Ferri
DF	3	(Germany) Andreas Brehme
MF	8	(Italy) Antonio Paganin
MF	7	(Italy) Alessandro Bianchi
MF	4	(Italy) Nicola Berti
MF	10	(Germany) Lothar Matthäus
FW	11	(Italy) Fausto Pizzi	(substituted off) 67'
FW	9	(Germany) Jürgen Klinsmann
Substitutes:
GK	12	(Italy) Astutillo Malgioglio
DF	16	(Italy) Massimiliano Tacchinardi
DF	13	(Italy) Andrea Mandorlini		(substituted on) 67'
MF	14	(Italy) Paolo Stringara
FW	15	(Italy) Maurizio Iorio
Manager:
(Italy) Giovanni Trapattoni

== See also ==
- 1991 European Cup final
- 1991 European Cup Winners' Cup final
- AS Roma in European football
- Inter Milan in European football
- Italian football clubs in international competitions
- 1990–91 AS Roma season
- 1990–91 Inter Milan season
