= Baresi =

Baresi is an Italian surname from the Province of Brescia. Notable people with the surname include:

- Franco Baresi (1960–2026), Italian football player and manager
- Gélson Baresi (born 1974), Brazilian footballer
- Giuseppe Baresi (born 1958), Italian football player and manager
- Regina Baresi (born 1991), Italian footballer
- Sérgio Baresi (born 1973), Brazilian football player and manager

== See also ==
- FC Baresi, a football club from London
- Barese (disambiguation)
