= Rivolta =

Rivolta is an Italian surname. Notable people with the surname include:

- Achille Rivolta (1908–1992), Italian philatelist
- Alberto Rivolta (1967–2019), Italian footballer
- Enrico Rivolta (1905–1974), Italian footballer
- Matteo Rivolta (born 1991), Italian swimmer
- Renzo Rivolta (1908–1966), Italian engineer
