= Barese (disambiguation) =

Barese is the demonym for the southern Italian city of Bari. It may also refer to:

- Barese dialect, the dialect spoken in the city of Bari and its surroundings
- Nick Barese (born 1986), American baseball coach and former player
- Lorenzo "Larry Boy" Barese and Albert "Ally Boy" Barese, two characters from The Sopranos.

== See also ==
- Baresi
