= Romano Galvani =

Italian footballer

Personal information
- Date of birth: 25 August 1962 (age 64)
- Place of birth: Manerbio, Italy
- Height: 1.80 m (5 ft 11 in)
- Position: Midfielder

Senior career*
Years	Team	Apps	(Gls)
1980–1985	Cremonese	97	(6)
1985–1986	Avellino	11	(1)
1986–1992	Bologna	93	(3)
1987–1988	→ Pescara (loan)	17	(2)
1988–1989	→ Internazionale (loan)	3	(0)
1992–1993	Palazzolo	8	(0)
- * Club domestic league appearances and goals

Romano Galvani (born 25 August 1962 in Manerbio) is a retired Italian professional footballer who played as a midfielder.

== Honours ==
Inter

- Serie A champion: 1988–89.
