= 1992–93 Anglo-Italian Cup =

Tournament details
- Country: England and Italy

Final positions
- Champions: Cremonese
- Runners-up: Derby County

Tournament statistics
- Top goal scorer: Florjancic (Cremonese) 7 goals

The 1992–93 Anglo-Italian Cup was the fifth staging of the Anglo-Italian Cup, an annual association football tournament between clubs from England and Italy.

== Background ==
The competition was re-established in 1992–93 as a replacement for the Full Members' Cup. It was a professional tournament for teams competing in the second tier of football—the newly renamed First Division in England and Serie B in Italy.

The final was a single match played at Wembley, with Derby County losing 3–1 to Cremonese.

== Final ==
27 March 1993

Cremonese	3–1	Derby County
Verdelli 11'; Maspero 49'; Tentoni 83'	Report	Gabbiadini 23'

Wembley
Attendance: 37,024
