= Nicola Berti =

Italian footballer (born 1967)

Personal information
- Full name: Nicola Berti
- Date of birth: 14 April 1967 (age 59)
- Place of birth: Salsomaggiore Terme, Italy
- Height: 1.86 m (6 ft 1 in)
- Position: Midfielder

Senior career*
Years	Team	Apps	(Gls)
1983–1985	Parma	28	(0)
1985–1988	Fiorentina	80	(8)
1988–1998	Inter Milan	229	(29)
1998	Tottenham Hotspur	21	(3)
1999	Alavés	8	(1)
2000	Northern Spirit	8	(0)
Total		374	(41)

International career
1988–1995	Italy	39	(3)
Medal record
Men's Football
Representing Italy
FIFA World Cup
Runner-up	1994 USA
Third place	1990 Italy
- * Club domestic league appearances and goals

Nicola Berti Cavaliere OMRI (Italian pronunciation: [niˈkɔːla ˈbɛrti]; born 14 April 1967) is an Italian former footballer, who played as a midfielder. Berti's career spanned three decades, during which he played for several clubs: after beginning his career with Parma, he played with Fiorentina, and in particular Inter Milan, where he became an important figure in the club's midfield, winning a Serie A title and two UEFA Cups. After his time in Italy, he ended his career with spells in England, Spain, and Australia, at Tottenham, Alavés, and Northern Spirit respectively.

A dynamic, tenacious, and hard-working player, he was also regarded as a linchpin for the Italy national football team during the late 1980s and the early 1990s, notably reaching the final of the 1994 FIFA World Cup with Italy, and finishing in third place in the 1990 edition on home soil.

== Club career ==
Born in Salsomaggiore Terme, Berti started his career as a seventeen-year-old with Parma. In his debut season the club won the 1983–84 Serie C1 championship under manager Arrigo Sacchi, and gained promotion to Serie B. After three seasons at Fiorentina, he was signed by Inter Milan in 1988 for £3.6 million.

In his first season at the club, Berti formed a notable midfield partnership with Lothar Matthäus, and was part of a team which won the 1988–89 record breaking Scudetto by an 11-point margin under manager Giovanni Trapattoni, losing only twice, and setting a Serie A points record. Berti himself contributed seven league goals in Serie A that season from midfield.

While at Inter, Berti also won the 1989 Supercoppa Italiana, and the UEFA Cup three times, also reaching an additional final in 1997; he played a key role in the club's victories from midfield during this period, and scored in both the 1991 UEFA Cup final and the 1994 UEFA Cup final.

In January 1998, Berti joined Tottenham Hotspur on a free transfer. With Spurs in danger of relegation upon his arrival midway through the 1997–98 season, Berti helped the club to a 13th-placed finish in the Premier League. After George Graham replaced Christian Gross as manager of Tottenham, Berti was allowed to leave the club and join Alavés on a free transfer.

He later had a season in Australia, with Northern Spirit.

== International career ==
After playing for Italy's under 21 team at both the 1986 and 1988 UEFA European Under-21 Football Championships under manager Cesare Maldini (reaching the final in 1986), Berti made his debut for the Italy senior team against Norway in 1988, under Azeglio Vicini. He scored his first goal, in a 2–0 friendly win at home against Scotland, on his third appearance for the Azzurri.

He was included in the squad for the 1990 FIFA World Cup, where he appeared in four matches, wearing the number 10 shirt, including the third place playoff versus England which Italy won 2–1; in the final minutes of the match, he scored from a Roberto Baggio cross, but the goal was incorrectly ruled offside. At the 1994 World Cup under Arrigo Sacchi, Berti was more established and played in every match on the way to and including the final defeat against Brazil; he notably started the play which led to Roberto Baggio's last-minute match winning goal in the quarter-finals, against Spain, with a trademark long pass, after winning back possession. In total, he represented Italy on 39 occasions between 1988 and 1995, scoring three goals.

== Style of play ==
Berti was usually deployed in a central or holding midfield role. Despite his initial lack of notable elegance or technical ability, he was able to improve his ball skills significantly as his career progressed, showing great finesse and technical developments with time, and became known for his ability to run forward with the ball at speed from midfield due to his pace and athleticism, which made him difficult to contain during counter–attacks. He was an energetic, tenacious, and hard tackling box-to-box midfielder, who had a knack for committing fouls and picking up cards due to his aggressive challenges; although he was initially considered to be undisciplined from a tactical standpoint, as unlike most defensive midfielders, he preferred to put pressure on his opponents in more advanced midfield roles and press them further up the pitch rather than mainly sitting in front of his team's defence, he later demonstrated significantly improved tactical intelligence as he matured. A tall, slender, and dynamic footballer, he was known in particular for his pace, stamina, work-rate, vision, and passing range, which made him a versatile player, who was capable of playing anywhere in midfield; these skills allowed him to aid his team both defensively and offensively, or start attacking plays with long balls after obtaining possession. In addition to his ability to break down opposing plays, Berti was also effective in the air, which, along with his attacking drive, movement, and positional sense, as well as his powerful and accurate striking ability from distance, enabled him to run forward – either on or off the ball – after winning back possession, and contribute to his team's offensive play with additional goals from midfield. Although he was initially noted for his physical resemblance to playmaker Gianni Rivera in his youth, Berti's attributes and direct playing style later led him to be compared instead to his childhood idol, Marco Tardelli. During the 1994 World Cup final against Brazil, he was also used out of position as both a left and right–sided winger in a 4–4–2 formation by manager Arrigo Sacchi. Despite his ability, however, he was also known to be injury prone, which somewhat negatively affected the quality of his performances in his later career.

== Career statistics ==
=== International goals ===
Scores and results list Italy's goal tally first, score column indicates score after each Berti goal.

List of international goals scored by Nicola Berti
No.	Date	Venue	Opponent	Score	Result	Competition
1	22 December 1988	Stadio Renato Curi, Perugia, Italy	Scotland		2–0	Friendly match
2	25 March 1989	Praterstadion, Vienna, Austria	Austria		2–0	Friendly match
3	26 April 1989	Stadio Erasmo Iacovone, Taranto, Italy	Hungary		4–0	Friendly match

== Honours ==
Parma

- Serie C: 1983–84

Inter Milan

- Serie A: 1988–89; runner-up 1992–93
- Supercoppa Italiana: 1989
- UEFA Cup: 1990–91, 1993–94; runner-up 1996–97

Tottenham Hotspur

- Football League Cup: 1998–99

Italy

- FIFA World Cup: runner-up 1994; third place 1990
- Scania 100 Tournament: 1991

Individual

- Pirata d'Oro (Inter Milan Player of the Year): 1994

Orders

- 5th Class / Knight: Cavaliere Ordine al Merito della Repubblica Italiana: 1991
