= Ramón Díaz =

Argentine football manager (born 1959)

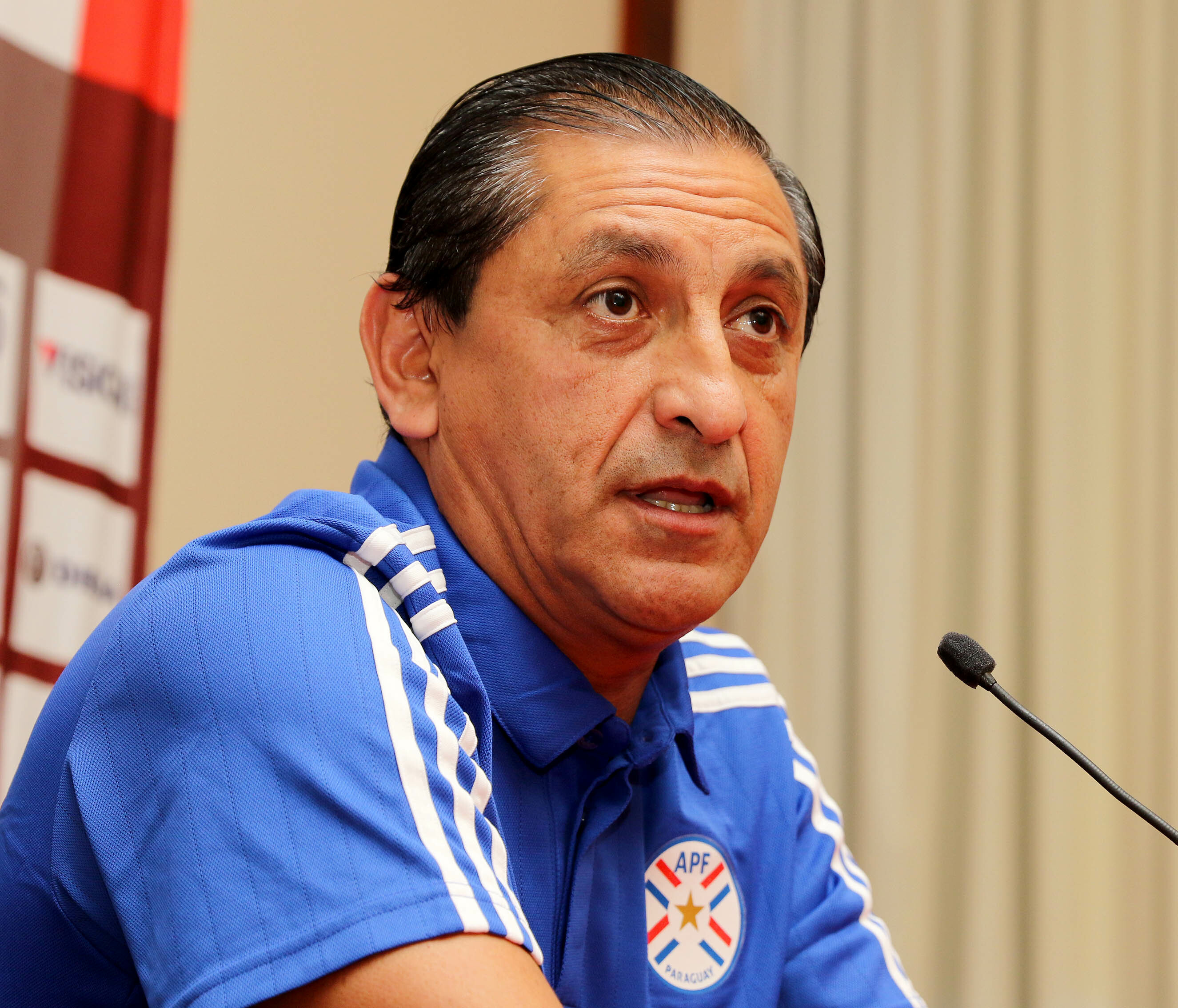
- Díaz as Paraguay manager in 2016

Personal information
- Full name: Ramón Ángel Díaz
- Date of birth: 29 August 1959 (age 67)
- Place of birth: La Rioja, Argentina
- Height: 1.73 m (5 ft 8 in)
- Position: Striker

Senior career*
Years	Team	Apps	(Gls)
1978–1982	River Plate	123	(57)
1982–1983	Napoli	25	(3)
1983–1986	Avellino	78	(22)
1986–1989	Fiorentina	53	(17)
1988–1989	→ Inter Milan (loan)	33	(12)
1989–1991	Monaco	60	(24)
1991–1993	River Plate	52	(27)
1993–1995	Yokohama Marinos	75	(52)
Total		499	(215)

International career
1978–1979	Argentina U20	6	(8)
1979–1982	Argentina	22	(10)

Managerial career
- 1995–2000: River Plate
- 2001–2002: River Plate
- 2004–2005: Oxford United
- 2007–2008: San Lorenzo
- 2008–2009: América
- 2010–2011: San Lorenzo
- 2011–2012: Independiente
- 2012–2014: River Plate
- 2014–2016: Paraguay
- 2016–2018: Al Hilal
- 2018: Al-Ittihad
- 2019: Pyramids
- 2020: Libertad
- 2020: Botafogo
- 2021–2022: Al Nasr
- 2022–2023: Al Hilal
- 2023–2024: Vasco da Gama
- 2024–2025: Corinthians
- 2025: Olimpia
- 2025: Internacional
- * Club domestic league appearances and goals

Ramón Ángel Díaz (Spanish pronunciation: [raˈmon ˈaŋxel ˈdi.as]; born 29 August 1959) is an Argentine football manager and former player. He is the most successful Argentine coach in history with 17 titles, the second most successful manager in River Plate's history after Marcelo Gallardo and the most successful in Argentine Primera División along with Ángel Labruna.

Díaz notably played for River Plate and the Argentina national team as a striker, and coached the club on three occasions, winning eight titles. He is also known by the nickname of El Pelado ("Baldy").

== Club career ==
=== River Plate ===
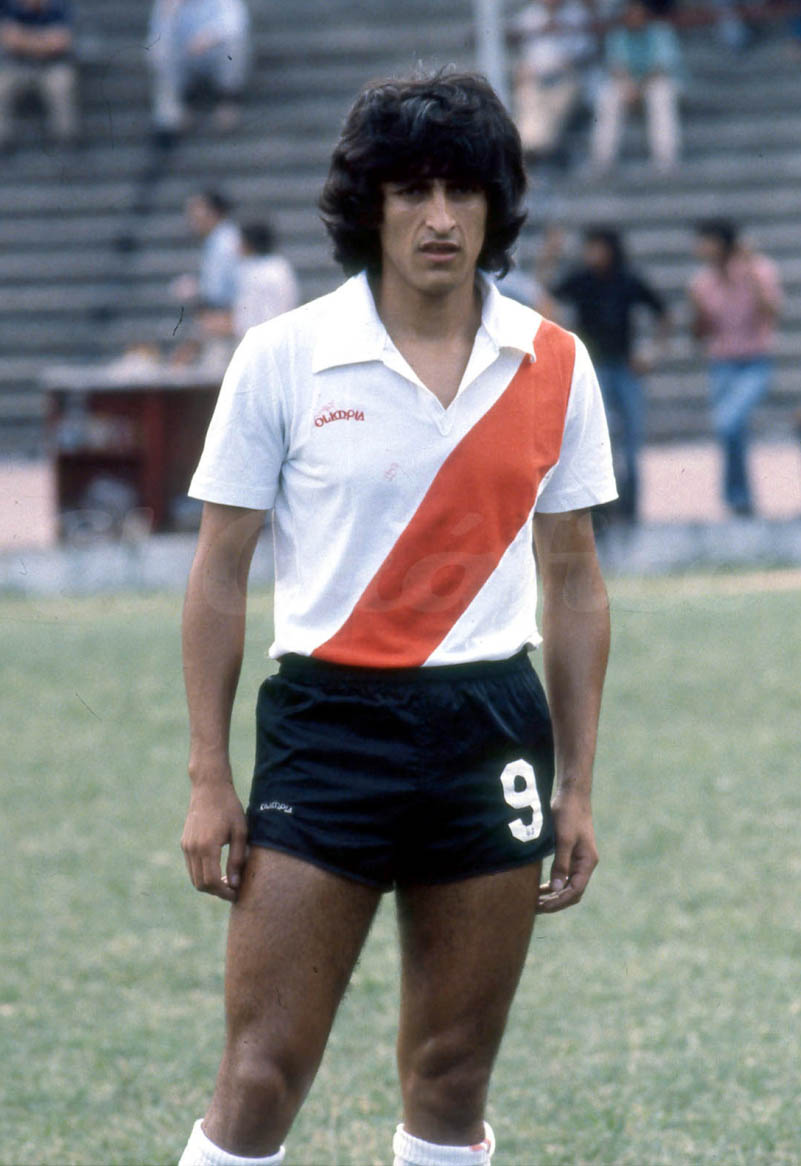
Díaz playing for River Plate in 1981

Born in La Rioja, Díaz was a youth product of River Plate, being a spotlight under youth manager Norberto Yácono. He made his first team – Primera División – debut on 13 August 1978, starting in a 1–0 win over Colón, as the club used an alternative lineup as the first team regulars were out on a trip to Europe.

Díaz scored his first goal on 30 August 1978, in a 1–1 draw against Quilmes. He went on to become a regular starter for the club, notably scoring 22 league goals in the 1980 season.

=== Italy ===
In 1982, Díaz moved abroad for the first time in his career, signing for Italian Serie A side Napoli. Despite finishing his first and only season at the club as the top scorer with eight goals overall, Napoli's campaign was disappointing as they finished in the 10th position, only two points away from relegation.

In 1983, Díaz joined Avellino initially on loan, being a regular starter during his three-season spell and scoring 11 goals in the 1985–86 campaign. In July 1986, he moved to Fiorentina for a 10 billion lire fee.

On 21 July 1988, Díaz agreed to a loan deal with Inter Milan as a replacement to Rabah Madjer, which had failed his medical. Despite scoring 15 goals overall in the season, being the club's second-best goalscorer (only behind Aldo Serena), he was not purchased by Inter and subsequently replaced by Jürgen Klinsmann.

=== Monaco, River Plate return and retirement ===
In 1989, Díaz moved to French club Monaco, and won the 1990–91 Coupe de France with the club. In 1991, he returned to his first club River Plate, being the top scorer of the 1991 Apertura Tournament.

At the end of his career, Díaz was the 1993 J.League Top Scorer with Yokohama Marinos in Japan, and he is the all-time top scorer of the Yokohama derby, scoring 8 goals against Yokohama Flügels.

== International career ==
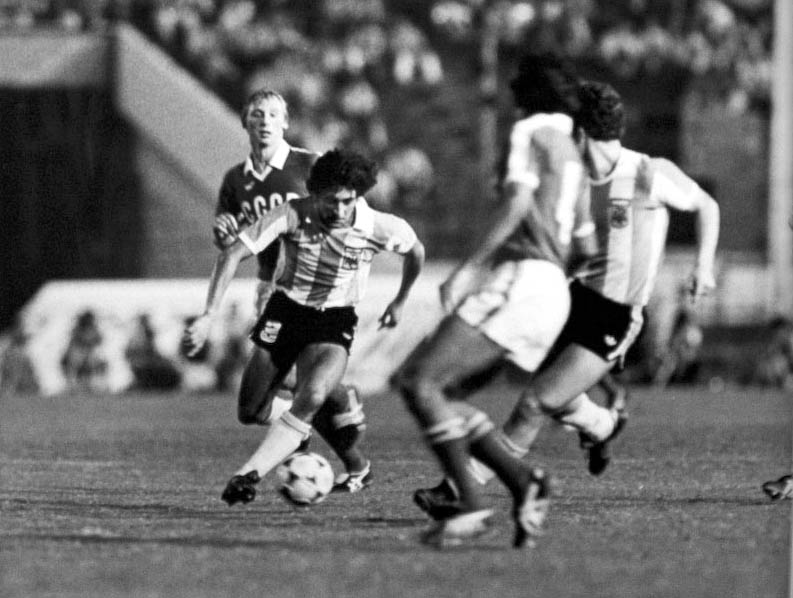
Diaz (with the ball) playing for Argentina U20 at the 1979 U-20 World Cup

Díaz was on the Argentina under-20 team that won the 1979 FIFA World Youth Championship, alongside Diego Maradona. Díaz and Maradona were the core of the attack-minded team, and together scored 14 of the team's 20 goals (70%). Díaz scored 8 goals, winning the Golden Boot for being the top scorer of the competition. Maradona scored 6 goals, winning the Best Player award.

Díaz then went on to play in the 1982 FIFA World Cup and scored against Brazil in Argentina's 3–1 defeat. It had been rumoured that he and Maradona were involved in a feud which prevented Díaz from playing for Argentina in the 1986 and 1990 World Cups. However, this was denied by Maradona in his autobiography Yo soy el Diego, claiming that he had told the then-Argentina manager, Carlos Bilardo, that he wanted Diaz in both the 1986 and 1990 World Cup squads.

== Managerial career ==
=== River Plate ===
In 1995, Díaz was named manager of his first club River Plate, replacing sacked Carlos Babington; his intentions at the time were to play for the club before retiring, but president Alfredo Davicce invited him as manager instead. His first match in charge of the club occurred on 26 July, a 1–1 Copa Libertadores draw against Vélez Sarsfield.

Díaz notably won the 1996 Libertadores and the 1997 Supercopa Libertadores with River, aside from four league titles in his first spell. He resigned from the club in February 2000, after a 2–1 friendly loss to rivals Boca Juniors and after having altercations with the club's board.

On 23 June 2001, Díaz agreed to return to River, replacing his successor Américo Gallego. He won another league title (the 2002 Clausura Tournament), but was replaced by Manuel Pellegrini on 20 May 2002, as the club opted to not renew his contract.

=== Oxford United ===
On 9 December 2004, Díaz replaced Graham Rix as manager of English League Two club Oxford United. At the time, Díaz told the media: "I like English football and I wanted to get first-hand experience of it...I'd seen plenty of it on television... It's also very interesting to work at this level, because it's completely different from football at the top." It was also claimed that neither Díaz nor any of his five backroom staff were being paid by Oxford United for their services.

On 4 May 2005, Díaz resigned from Oxford after "negotiations over a new contract broke down".

=== San Lorenzo ===
On 24 December 2006, Díaz was appointed head coach of San Lorenzo for the upcoming season. He helped the club lift the 2007 Clausura Tournament title, the club's first title in six years.

Despite qualifying San Lorenzo to the 2008 Copa Libertadores, Díaz's side were knocked out by champions LDU Quito in May, and he resigned from the club on 28 May.

=== Club América ===
On 15 May 2008, Diaz was confirmed as the new Club América coach. Although the club did not reveal specific details about Diaz' contract, he was reportedly offered 1.5 million dollars per year including performance-related bonuses which could have taken his total earnings to 6 million dollars. Díaz failed to make Club América qualify to Copa Libertadores.

In the start of the Clausura 2009 season, Díaz won against Santos Laguna 2–1, drew against Toluca 2–2, and lost against Morelia 1–0 and Pachuca 3–1. After two consecutive league losses, and the club being in 12th position in the league table, he was dismissed on 10 February 2009.

=== Return to San Lorenzo ===
On 25 May 2010, it was made official by San Lorenzo president Savino that Díaz was appointed manager for the second time, after agreeing to a one-year contract. After a mid-table campaign in the 2010 Apertura, he resigned on 24 April 2011, stating that he wanted to "fight for the first positions".

=== Independiente ===
On 12 September 2011, Independiente hired Díaz to replace Antonio Mohamed, who had resigned. On 5 March 2012, he resigned from his position at the club, who had been struggling and found themselves at the very bottom of the table.

=== Third spell at River Plate ===
On 30 November 2012, Díaz returned to River Plate for his third spell as manager. He won the Torneo Final in 2014, and also won the Superfinal against former side San Lorenzo by 1–0.

On 27 May 2014, Díaz left River Plate.

=== Paraguay national team ===
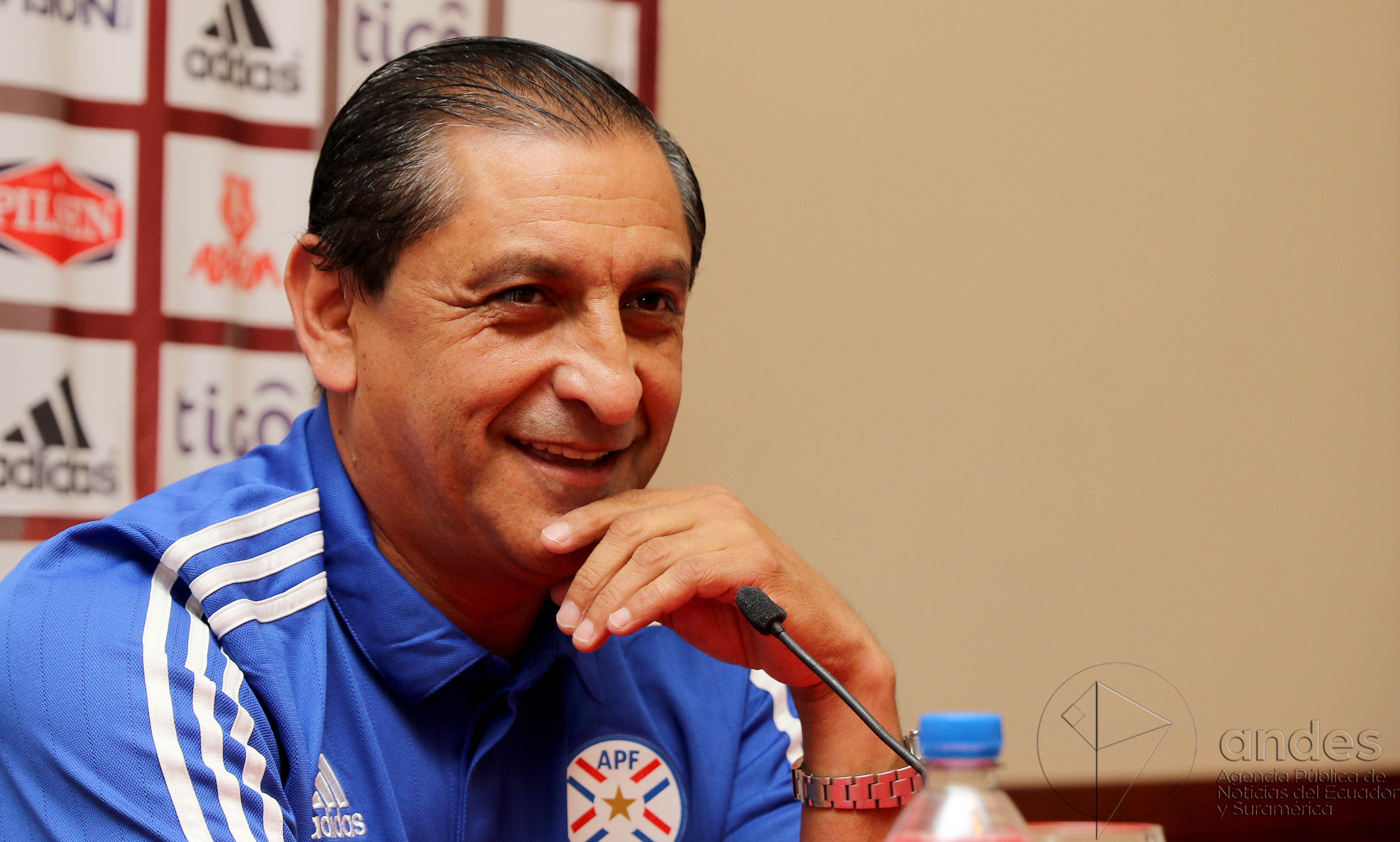
Díaz during a press conference as Paraguay manager, 2016

On 5 December 2014, Díaz became the manager of the Paraguay national team. He said: "It's one of the biggest challenges of my career... There's a lot of work to do". His first major competition was the 2015 Copa América, with his first match being against Argentina which they drew 2–2. Paraguay subsequently defeated Jamaica 1–0 and drew 1–1 against Uruguay, finishing second in their group.

Paraguay won the quarterfinal against Brazil 1–1 (4–3 on penalties), but lost 6–1 to Argentina in the semifinals which let them go to the third group playoff which they lost 2–0 against Peru which made Paraguay fourth in the Copa América. He was also in charge of the nation in the Copa América Centenario, where Paraguay were eliminated in the group stage, by drawing against Costa Rica and losing to Colombia 2–1 and the US 1–0.

On 12 June 2016, following an unsuccessful run at Copa América Centenario, Díaz resigned as manager of Paraguay.

=== Al-Hilal ===
On 13 October 2016 Ramón Díaz was appointed manager of Al-Hilal after former manager Gustavo Matosas was sacked with a one-year contract.

==== 2016–17 season ====
Ramón's first match was against Al-Fateh where Al-Hilal won 1–0. On 25 November, Rámon played his first important match against Al-Ahli where they won 2–1. Ramón drew the Riyadh Derby against Al-Nassr 1–1. Ramón won 4–2 against Al-Taawon. He won against Ittihad 3–1. Ramón Diaz drew 0–0 against Al-Ahli, but he won against Al-Shabab 2–1 to secure the title. Al-Hilal lifted the league against Al-Nassr in the Riyadh Derby after winning 5–1 in the league. Ramón Díaz renewed his contract for one more year for 1.5 million dollars. Ramón made Al-Hilal first in the Champions League group stages after winning against Al-Rayyan 4–3. Ramón made Al-Hilal qualify to the King's Cup final after beating Al-Taawon 3–4. Ramón Díaz won the King's Cup against Al-Ahli in final 3–2. Rámon Díaz won the Champions League Round of 16 first leg against Esteghlal Khuzestan 2–1. Díaz won the second leg 2–1 again [2–4 on AGG] making Al-Hilal go to the quarterfinals of the AFC Champions League.

==== 2017–18 season ====
On 4 June, Díaz signed Mukhtar Fallatah to make him the first signing of the season. On 19 June 2017, Ramòn Díaz made Omar Kharbin a permanent signing after he was on loan, the fee 11 million dollars (44 million riyals) and signed a four-year contract with Al-Hilal. On 10 Jan, Díaz signed Ali Al Bulaihi for free from Al-Fateh. On 3 July, Al-Hilal signed Mohamed Kanno and Hasan Kadish from Ettifaq.
On 10 August, Díaz won the first match of the season 2–1 against league debutant Al-Fayha. On 15 August, Ramón Díaz won his second match of the season which was against Al-Taawoun 4–3. On 21 August, Díaz made Al-Hilal draw against Al Ain 0–0 in the 2017 AFC Champions League quarter finals.

On 11 September, Díaz made Al-Hilal qualify to the semi-final of the AFC Champions League after beating Al-Ain 3–0. After that, he signed Gelmin Rivas to become his sixth registered foreigner player in the 2017–18 season. On 16 September, Ramón Díaz won the third match of season against Ohod 1–0. On 21 September, Al-Hilal drew against Al-Ittihad 1–1. On 26 October, Diaz made Al-Hilal won the Riyadh Derby against Al-Nassr.

On 18 November, Díaz and his team drew in the first leg of the final of the AFC Champions League against Urawa Red Diamonds 1–1 in Riyadh. On 25 November, they lost the second 1–0 making them runners-up in the tournament. On 1 December, he led his team to win against title challengers Al-Ahli 2–0. On 17 December, Díaz and his team lost their first match in the league against Al-Fayha 2–1. After that, Diaz won against Ohod 4–1. On 20 January, Al-Hilal were knocked out of the Kings Cup by Al-Qadisyah in the round of 16. On 13 February, Al-Hilal drew their first match in their new stadium the King Saud University Stadium against Al-Ain 0–0 in the Champions League. On 20 February, Al-Hilal lost 1–0 against Esteghlal in Oman.

On 21 February 2018, Al-Hilal sacked Díaz due to unsatisfactory performances.

=== Pyramids ===
On 26 January 2019, Díaz was named manager of Egyptian side Pyramids FC. He left the club on 27 May, after just 12 matches.

=== Libertad ===
On 17 December 2019, Díaz was announced as manager of Libertad, returning to Paraguay after more than three years. He resigned on 24 September 2020, after the club's poor run of form.

=== Botafogo ===
On 8 November 2020, Díaz was named head coach of Série A side Botafogo. He subsequently returned to his home country to make an emergency surgery to remove a tumor, and his absence was prolonged due to his clinical condition.

On 27 November 2020, Botafogo announced the departure of Díaz and his staff from the club. He left the club without managing a single match for them, as the three matches played by them during the period (all losses) were managed by his assistant and son Emiliano Díaz.

=== Al Nassr ===
In February 2021, Díaz agreed to a contract with Al Nassr to last until the summer of 2022. He left the club roughly one year later, after a poor league form.

=== Return to Al Hilal ===
On 14 February 2022, Díaz was named as the new coach of Saudi Professional League club Al Hilal until the end of the season. However, he later led Al Hilal to defeat Flamengo 3–2 in the 2022 FIFA Club World Cup semi-finals, before losing the final 3–5 against Real Madrid.

In the 2022 AFC Champions League final, his team lost 2–1 on aggregate against Urawa Red Diamonds for the second time after 2017. After winning the King Cup final against Al-Wehda in May 2023, Díaz decided to step down from his post and return to his country, in order to be with his family following the death of his wife two months earlier in a car accident; meanwhile, his son Emiliano became the caretaker manager of the club for the rest of the season.

=== Vasco da Gama ===
On 15 July 2023, Díaz returned to Brazil after being announced as head coach of Vasco da Gama in the top tier. He managed to narrowly avoid relegation with the club in the last round of the 2023 Série A, and renewed his contract until 2025 on 15 December.

On 27 April 2024, Díaz was sacked by Vasco after a 4–0 loss to Criciúma; despite Brazilian media outlets stating that he resigned just after the match, both Díaz and his son stated that they were "sacked through Twitter".

=== Corinthians ===
On 10 July 2024, Díaz was announced as head coach of Corinthians on a contract until December 2025. He led the side to the 2025 Campeonato Paulista title over rivals Palmeiras, lifting the 17th trophy of his managerial career and surpassing Helenio Herrera as the most successful Argentine coach in history.

On 17 April 2025, however, Díaz was dismissed by the club after a 2–0 home loss to Fluminense.

=== Internacional ===
On 24 September 2025, Díaz was appointed head coach of Internacional also in the Brazilian top tier. He was sacked on 29 November, two rounds before the end of the season, as the club entered the relegation zone.

== Career statistics ==
=== Club ===
Appearances and goals by club, season and competition
Club	Season	League			National cup (Note: Includes Coppa Italia, Coupe de France, Emperor's Cup.)		League cup (Note: Includes Coupe de la Ligue, J.League Cup.)		Continental (Note: Includes UEFA Cup, European Cup Winners' Cup.)		Total	
Club	Season	Division	Apps	Goals	Apps	Goals	Apps	Goals	Apps	Goals	Apps	Goals
River Plate	1978	Argentine Primera División	14	5							14	5
River Plate	1979	Argentine Primera División	22	12							22	12
River Plate	1980	Argentine Primera División	40	22							40	22
River Plate	1981	Argentine Primera División	47	18							47	18
River Plate	Total		123	57							123	57
Napoli	1982–83	Serie A	25	3	9	3			4 (Note: Appearances in UEFA Cup)	2	38	8
Avellino	1983–84	Serie A	24	7	4	0					28	7
Avellino	1984–85	Serie A	27	5	5	0					32	5
Avellino	1985–86	Serie A	27	10	5	1					32	11
Avellino	Total		78	22	14	1					92	23
Fiorentina	1986–87	Serie A	29	10	4	0			2	0	35	10
Fiorentina	1987–88	Serie A	24	7	7	5					31	12
Fiorentina	Total		53	17	11	5			2	0	66	22
Inter Milan	1988–89	Serie A	33	12	7	1			3	2	43	15
Monaco	1989–90	Division 1	28	15	0	0			7 (Note: Appearances in European Cup Winners' Cup)	3	35	18
Monaco	1990–91	Division 1	32	9	6	1			5	2	43	12
Monaco	Total		60	24	6	1			12	5	78	30
River Plate	1991–92	Argentine Primera División	31	20							31	20
River Plate	1992–93	Argentine Primera División	21	7							21	7
River Plate	Total		52	27							52	27
Yokohama Marinos	1993	J1 League	32	28	3	1	5	3			40	32
Yokohama Marinos	1994	J1 League	37	23	4	2	3	1			44	26
Yokohama Marinos	1995	J1 League	6	1	0	0	–				6	1
Yokohama Marinos	Total		75	52	7	3	8	4			90	59
Career total			499	214	54	14	8	4	21	9	582	241

=== International ===
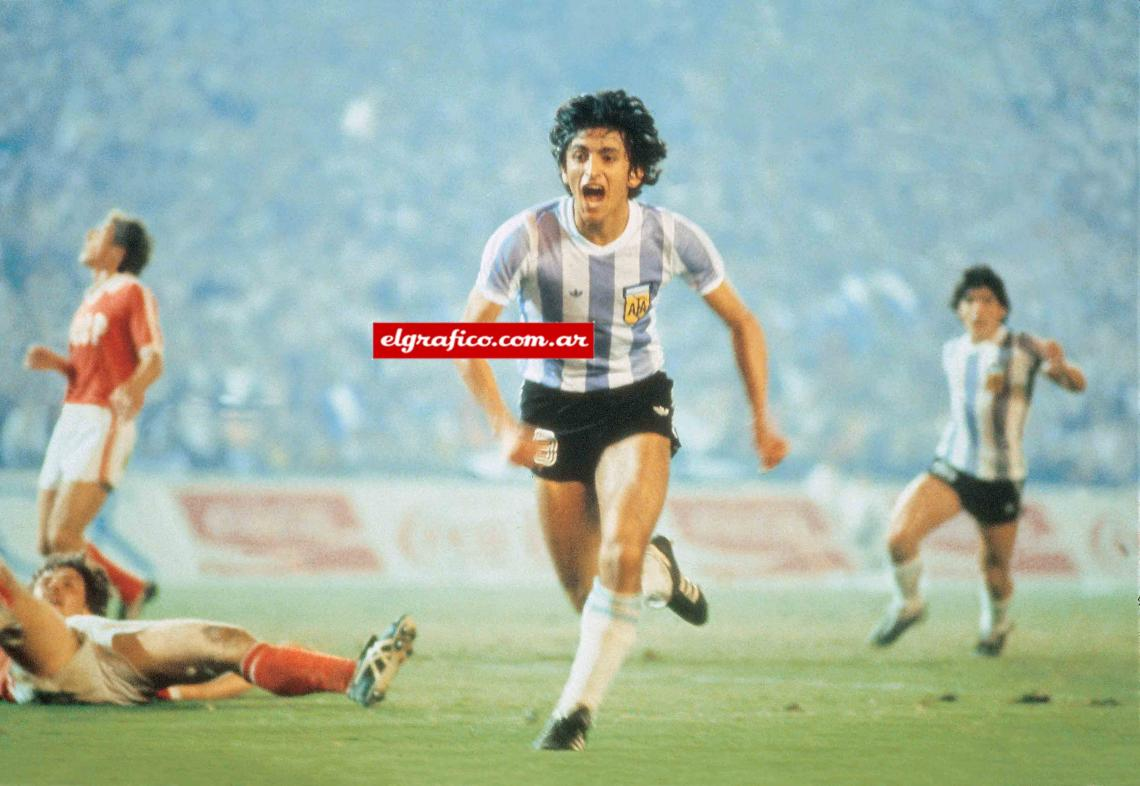
Díaz celebrating a goal at the 1979 FIFA U-20 World Cup

Appearances and goals by national team and year
National team	Year	Apps	Goals
Argentina	1979	1	1
Argentina	1980	9	4
Argentina	1981	4	1
Argentina	1982	8	4
Total		22	10

== Managerial statistics ==
As of match played on 28 November 2025

Managerial record by team and tenure
Team	Nat.	From	To	Record								Ref
Team	Nat.	From	To	G	W	D	L	GF	GA	GD	Win %	Ref
River Plate	(Argentina)	8 July 1995	11 February 2000	252	126	66	60	451	303	+148	50.00	
River Plate	(Argentina)	1 July 2001	30 June 2002	52	29	14	9	111	49	+62	55.77	
Oxford United	(England)	9 December 2004	4 May 2005	25	10	7	8	34	36	−2	40.00	
San Lorenzo	(Argentina)	24 December 2006	12 June 2008	68	37	14	17	104	77	+27	54.41	
América	(Mexico)	25 June 2008	12 February 2009	24	7	9	8	32	36	−4	29.17	
San Lorenzo	(Argentina)	25 May 2010	24 April 2011	30	10	9	11	29	29	+0	33.33	
Independiente	(Argentina)	12 September 2011	5 March 2012	20	7	5	8	21	20	+1	35.00	
River Plate	(Argentina)	30 November 2012	27 May 2014	66	30	17	19	76	57	+19	45.45	
Paraguay	(Paraguay)	4 December 2014	12 June 2016	20	3	9	8	18	28	−10	15.00	
Al-Hilal	(Saudi Arabia)	15 October 2016	20 February 2018	65	41	18	6	126	58	+68	63.08	
Al-Ittihad	(Saudi Arabia)	1 July 2018	15 September 2018	4	0	1	3	2	7	−5	0.00	
Pyramids	(Egypt)	14 February 2019	27 May 2019	13	8	4	1	22	9	+13	61.54	
Libertad	(Paraguay)	20 December 2019	24 September 2020	24	14	4	6	45	29	+16	58.33	
Botafogo	(Brazil)	4 November 2020	27 November 2020	0	0	0	0	0	0	+0	—	
Al Nasr	(United Arab Emirates)	4 February 2021	7 February 2022	37	14	8	15	56	46	+10	37.84	
Al-Hilal	(Saudi Arabia)	14 February 2022	14 May 2023	60	39	12	9	123	53	+70	65.00	
Vasco da Gama	(Brazil)	15 July 2023	27 April 2024	41	17	11	13	58	52	+6	41.46	
Corinthians	(Brazil)	10 July 2024	17 April 2025	60	31	16	13	94	62	+32	51.67	
Olimpia	(Paraguay)	17 July 2025	24 August 2025	7	2	2	3	7	11	−4	28.57	
Internacional	(Brazil)	24 September 2025	29 November 2025	13	3	5	5	13	17	−4	23.08	
Total				881	428	230	223	1,422	979	+443	48.58	—

== Honours ==
=== Player ===
River Plate

- Primera División Argentina: 1979 Metropolitano, 1979 Nacional, 1980 Metropolitano, 1981 Nacional, 1991 Apertura
- Supercopa Libertadores runner-up: 1991

Inter Milan

- Serie A: 1988–89

Monaco

- Coupe de France: 1990–91
- Ligue 1 runner-up: 1990–91

Yokohama Marinos

- J1 League: 1995

Argentina U20

- FIFA World Youth Championship: 1979

Individual

- FIFA World Youth Championship Golden Boot: 1979
- Serie A Team of The Year: 1986
- Primera División Argentina Top Scorer: 1991 Apertura
- South American Footballer of the Year Second place: 1991
- South American team of the year: 1991
- J.League Top Scorer: 1993
- J.League Best XI: 1993

=== Manager ===
River Plate

- Primera División Argentina: 1996 Apertura, 1997 Clausura, 1997 Apertura, 1999 Apertura, 2002 Clausura, 2014 Final
- Copa Campeonato: 2014
- Copa Libertadores: 1996
- Supercopa Libertadores: 1997
- Intercontinental Cup runner-up: 1996
- Recopa Sudamericana runner-up: 1997, 1998

San Lorenzo

- Primera División Argentina: 2007 Clausura

Al-Hilal

- Saudi Professional League: 2016–17, 2021–22
- King's Cup: 2017, 2022–23; runner-up 2021–22
- AFC Champions League runner-up: 2017, 2022
- FIFA Club World Cup runner-up: 2022

Al-Ittihad

- Saudi Super Cup runner-up: 2018

Al-Nasr

- UAE League Cup runner-up: 2020–21
- UAE President's Cup runner-up: 2020–21

Corinthians

- Campeonato Paulista: 2025

Individual

- EFL League Two Manager of the Month: January 2005
- Saudi Professional League Manager of the Month: March 2022, May & June 2022
