= Stefano Borgonovo =

Italian footballer and manager

- Borgonovo with Italy in 1989

Personal information
- Date of birth: 17 March 1964
- Place of birth: Giussano, Italy
- Date of death: 27 June 2013 (aged 49)
- Place of death: Florence, Italy
- Height: 1.78 m (5 ft 10 in)
- Position: Striker

Youth career
- Como

Senior career*
Years	Team	Apps	(Gls)
1981–1986	Como	63	(13)
1984–1985	→ Sambenedettese (loan)	33	(13)
1986–1990	Milan	13	(2)
1986–1988	→ Como (loan)	33	(3)
1988–1989	→ Fiorentina (loan)	30	(14)
1990–1992	Fiorentina	37	(4)
1992–1993	Pescara	35	(11)
1993–1996	Udinese	14	(2)
1994–1995	→ Brescia (loan)	14	(0)
Total		272	(62)

International career
1985–1986	Italy U21	3	(1)
1989	Italy	3	(0)
- * Club domestic league appearances and goals

Stefano Borgonovo (Italian pronunciation: [ˈsteːfano borɡoˈnɔːvo]; 17 March 1964 – 27 June 2013) was an Italian footballer and manager, who played as a striker. An opportunistic striker, Borgonovo played for several Italian clubs throughout his career, and came to prominence while playing alongside Roberto Baggio with Fiorentina during the 1988–89 season, on loan from Milan. His prolific performances with Fiorentina earned him a permanent move to Milan, where he contributed to the club's European Cup victory in 1990, despite struggling with injuries.

Following his retirement, Borgonovo served as a youth coach with Como; after being diagnosed with amyotrophic lateral sclerosis, he started the Fondazione Stefano Borgonovo to raise funds and awareness of the disease. Until his death as a result of the illness in June 2013, he was also extremely active off the pitch in the fight against doping in football.

== Football career ==
Born in Giussano, Province of Monza and Brianza, Borgonovo began his professional career with Como Calcio, making his debut at 17 in a Serie A match against Ascoli Calcio, and reaching the semi-final of the 1985–86 Coppa Italia with the club. After a loan spell at S.S. Sambenedettese Calcio he established himself as a key player, and in 1986 moved to AC Milan, who immediately loaned him back to Como.

After two years Borgonovo was sent on loan again, this time to ACF Fiorentina, where he had the most successful season of his career, scoring 14 league goals in 30 appearances while playing alongside attacking partner Roberto Baggio under coach Sergio Santarini. The two forwards would form an important friendship, and their prolific goalscoring exploits that season (together they scored 29 of Fiorentina's 44 Serie A goals that season) would earn the attacking pair the nickname "B2", as both their surnames began with the letter B; together, they helped Fiorentina to qualify for the UEFA Cup. One of his most memorable performances with Fiorentina came in a 4–3 win over Giovanni Trapattoni's Inter Milan side on 12 February 1989, in the last match of the first round; Inter were in first place, and were unbeaten in the league at the time. With Fiorentina trailing 3–2, Borgonovo first scored a goal to tie the match, and subsequently also netted the match-winner in the 85th minute, after hiding behind Inter defender Riccardo Ferri, and suddenly running to intercept Giuseppe Bergomi's back-pass, who later admitted that he was not aware of Borgonovo's position; Borgonovo subsequently anticipated Inter goalkeeper Walter Zenga's run and took it past him before putting the ball into the empty net to win the match. Inter went on to win the next eight matches and eventually won the Serie A title that season, setting a new record for most points in a single Serie A season; the team went on a second unbeaten streak, which was interrupted by a defeat to Torino in the penultimate match of the season.

Borgonovo's performances earned him three caps for Italy, all in 1989 – his debut coming on 22 February 1989, in a friendly with Denmark, which ended in a 1–0 victory to the Italians. He also helped the under-21 side to qualify for the upcoming European Championships during the 1985–86 season, earning three caps, and scoring a crucial goal against Sweden, although he was unable to take part in the finals, in which Italy finished runners-up to Spain, due to injury.

Borgonovo's prolific season with Fiorentina also earned him the chance to prove himself with the defending European Cup champions Milan in 1989. He spent much of the 1989–90 campaign as backup to Marco van Basten, also due to injury, only making 13 appearances, and scoring 2 goals, although he helped Milan to capture the European Supercup, the Intercontinental Cup, and most notably, the European Cup that season, first winning a penalty for Van Basten, and then scoring a crucial goal himself in the semi-finals, against Bayern Münich; he scored 2 goals in total in the competition. Despite earning a prestigious European Cup winners' medal, he left the club at the end of the season, keen to play regular first-team football; although Milan coach Arrigo Sacchi was keen to keep his services, he returned to Fiorentina, where he spent two years without managing to recapture his previous form.

Spells at Pescara Calcio, Udinese and Brescia Calcio followed, before Borgonovo retired in 1996. He later served as a youth coach back at Como, but retired in 2005 due to poor health.

== Style of play ==
Borgonovo was a quick, agile, opportunistic, and intelligent striker, with an eye for goal. As a forward, he predominantly relied on his positional sense inside the penalty area – as well as his acceleration, and fast reactions – to score goals, despite not possessing significant pace over longer distances. These attributes, along with his ability to understand the game and predict where defenders would be, helped him compensate for his relatively small stature and slender physique, and allowed him to create space for himself and anticipate opponents inside the box, enabling him to be prolific in front of goal throughout his career. In addition to his goalscoring ability, he was also a lively player, with good mobility, link-up play, and technique, who was capable of playing off his team-mates, and was even deployed in a more supporting role as a second striker on occasion; however, his preferred and most effective role was as an out-and-out attacker, alongside a more withdrawn, creative playmaker.

== Personal life and illness ==
Borgonovo married Chantal, and the couple had four children. On 5 September 2008, it was revealed he was suffering from amyotrophic lateral sclerosis. To raise funds and awareness of the disease, he started his own foundation and a testimonial match was organized by his former clubs Florentine and Milan. The game, played on 8 October 2008 at Stadio Artemio Franchi, Florence in front of a crowd of 30,000 people, was attended by several former stars of the two clubs – he himself attended despite his serious condition, with former Fiorentina teammate Roberto Baggio at his side.

In his 2010 autobiography Carlo Ancelotti: The Beautiful Games of an Ordinary Genius: The Life, Games, and Miracles of an Ordinary Genius, Carlo Ancelotti spoke of his former team-mate's illness, saying: "Stefano was my team-mate, and he has a problem. We need everyone to help him because maybe there is a solution for this illness, but we have to be fast because his condition is not good. He cannot move, he can just speak with his eyes. He scored in the semi-final of the European Cup in 1990 against Bayern, and was a good striker inside the box. He was not so quick but very clever. He is a good guy, very funny, likes to joke, even now, but he has a very dangerous illness."

Borgonovo wrote an autobiography, Attaccante nato (Born striker), while only able to make use of his eyes to control a computer to write it. In the book, amongst other things, he talked about his stance against drugs, saying: "My carcass is clean and always has been. The Bitch (his name for his condition) may have moved in, but it's not tainted with rust and it's never been doped. There's a shadow hanging over my photograph, but it was invented by others, ruthless hypocrites. They used to weigh up the symptoms and then kept on whispering: Borgonovo's on drugs, you know."

In 2013, Borgonovo joined FIFA's anti-doping fight. He died from the disease on 27 June of that year, aged 49. His death coincided with the Italian national team's semifinal against Spain at the 2013 FIFA Confederations Cup, and the Italy squad wore black armbands as a mark of respect.

== Honours ==
A.C. Milan

- European Cup: 1989–90
- European Super Cup: 1989
- Intercontinental Cup: 1989

Individual

- Fiorentina Hall of Fame
- Premio Nazionale Speciale Carriera Esemplare "Gaetano Scirea": 2013 (posthumous)

== Bibliography ==
- Alessandro Alciato, Stefano Borgonovo, Attacante nato, Milan, Rizzoli, 2010, ISBN 88-17040-32-0 (Born striker). (in Italian)
