= 1989 Supercoppa Italiana =

- Event: Supercoppa Italiana
Inter Milan	Sampdoria
Serie A	Coppa Italia
2	0
- Date: 29 November 1989
- Venue: San Siro, Milan, Italy
- Referee: Carlo Longhi
- Attendance: 7,221

The 1989 Supercoppa Italiana was a match played by the 1988–89 Serie A winners Inter Milan and 1988–89 Coppa Italia winners Sampdoria. It took place on 29 November 1989 at the San Siro in Milan, Italy. Inter Milan won the match 2–0, to earn their first Supercoppa.

== Match details ==
29 November 1989

Inter Milan	2–0	Sampdoria
Cucchi 37'; Serena 86'	Report

San Siro, Milan, Italy
Attendance: 7,221
Referee: Carlo Longhi

Inter Milan	Sampdoria

INTER:
GK	1	(Italy) Walter Zenga
DF	5	(Italy) Giuseppe Baresi (c)
DF	3	(Germany) Andreas Brehme
MF	10	(Italy) Gianfranco Matteoli
DF	2	(Italy) Giuseppe Bergomi
DF	6	(Italy) Corrado Verdelli
MF	7	(Italy) Alessandro Bianchi
MF	4	(Italy) Nicola Berti
FW	11	(Italy) Dario Morello
MF	8	(Italy) Enrico Cucchi
FW	9	(Italy) Aldo Serena
Substitutes:
GK		unknown
		unknown
		unknown
		unknown
		unknown
Manager:
(Italy) Giovanni Trapattoni

SAMPDORIA:
GK	1	(Italy) Gianluca Pagliuca
DF	2	(Italy) Moreno Mannini
DF	4	(Italy) Giovanni Invernizzi
MF	3	(Italy) Fausto Pari
DF	5	(Italy) Pietro Vierchowod
DF	6	(Socialist Federal Republic of Yugoslavia) Srečko Katanec	(substituted off) 45'
MF	7	(Italy) Attilio Lombardo	(substituted off) 57'
MF	8	(Brazil) Toninho Cerezo
FW	9	(Italy) Gianluca Vialli
FW	10	(Italy) Roberto Mancini (c)
MF	11	(Italy) Giuseppe Dossena
Substitutes:
GK		unknown
DF	13	(Italy) Amedeo Carboni	(substituted on) 57'
MF	14	(Spain) Víctor Muñoz	(substituted on) 45'
		unknown
		unknown
Manager:
(Socialist Federal Republic of Yugoslavia) Vujadin Boškov

MATCH OFFICIALS

- Assistant referees:
- Fourth official:

MATCH RULES

- 90 minutes.
- 30 minutes of extra-time if necessary.
- Penalty shoot-out if scores still level.
- Five named substitutes
- Maximum of 2 substitutions.

== See also ==
- 1989–90 Inter Milan season
- 1989–90 UC Sampdoria season
