= Corrado Verdelli =

Italian footballer and coach (born 1963)

Personal information
- Date of birth: 30 September 1963 (age 63)
- Place of birth: Lodi, Italy
- Height: 1.82 m (5 ft 11 1/2 in)
- Position: Defender

Senior career*
Years	Team	Apps	(Gls)
1982–1983	Fanfulla	0	(0)
1984–1986	Oltrepò	56	(15)
1986–1990	Inter Milan	47	(0)
1987–1988	→ Monza (loan)	32	(1)
1990–1997	Cremonese	204	(1)
1997–1998	Fanfulla	29	(1)

Managerial career
- 1999–2001: Fanfulla
- 2001–2003: Inter Milan Primavera
- 2003: Inter Milan (assistant)
- 2003: Inter Milan (caretaker)
- 2003–2004: Inter Milan (assistant)
- 2004: Ternana
- 2006: Cremonese
- 2008–2009: Voghera
- 2009–2010: Pontisola
- 2010–2011: Monza
- * Club domestic league appearances and goals

Corrado Verdelli (born 30 September 1963) is an Italian professional football coach and a former player, who played as a defender.

== Playing career ==
Verdelli started his senior career with amateur club Oltrepò. In 1986, he was signed by Inter Milan, but then sent on loan to Monza in 1987; in his season with Monza, he provided a key contribution to the club's historical promotion to Serie B, and was subsequently awarded with a place in the main Internazionale roster for the 1988–89 season. During that season, Verdelli played mostly as a backup, appearing twenty times in the Giovanni Trapattoni-led team that won the Serie A title with just two defeats. In 1990, he left Inter Milan for Cremonese, where he played for seven consecutive seasons, became a mainstay and one of the most recognizable footballers of the Grigiorossi team that played in the top flight for four years. He retired in 1998 after a lone season with minor league team Fanfulla.

== Coaching career ==
In 1999 Verdelli started a coaching career as head of Fanfulla until 2001. He was successively appointed youth coach of Inter Milan, winning a Campionato Nazionale Primavera and a Torneo di Viareggio. In 2003, he was named assistant to Héctor Cúper, and served as caretaker for a spare week after the Argentine's dismissal.

In 2004 Verdelli was appointed head coach of Serie B club Ternana, but was replaced by Giovanni Vavassori a few weeks later. He then served as head coach also at Cremonese and Voghera, still with little luck. He successively worked as head coach of amateurs Pontisola in the 2009–2010 Serie D season, leading the club to third place. His return to professional coaching happened in the following season, as he was appointed boss of bottom-placed Lega Pro Prima Divisione club Monza in November 2010; Verdelli however failed to drive the club out of the relegation zone and found himself again in last place a few weeks before the end of the season, being consequently removed from his coaching duties on 30 March 2011.

== Honours ==
=== Player ===
Monza

- Coppa Italia Serie C winner: 1987–88

Inter Milan

- Serie A champion: 1988–89.
- Supercoppa Italiana winner: 1989.

Cremonese

- Anglo-Italian Cup winner: 1992–93.

=== Coach ===
Inter Milan U19

- Campionato Primavera 1 champion: 2001–02
- Torneo di Viareggio winner: 2002.
