= Gianfranco Matteoli =

Italian footballer

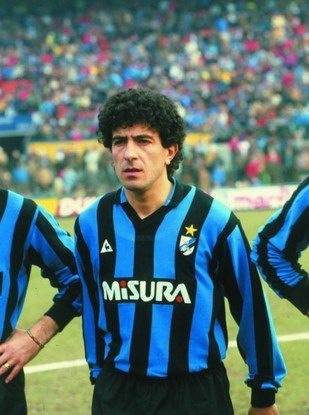

Personal information
- Full name: Gianfranco Matteoli
- Date of birth: 21 April 1959 (age 67)
- Place of birth: Nuoro, Italy
- Height: 1.70 m (5 ft 7 in)
- Position: Midfielder

Senior career*
Years	Team	Apps	(Gls)
1975–1976	Cantu San Paolo	3	(0)
1976–1979	Como	6	(1)
1979–1980	Osimana	31	(4)
1980–1982	Reggiana	51	(8)
1982–1985	Como	96	(7)
1985–1986	Sampdoria	22	(1)
1986–1990	Inter	116	(5)
1990–1994	Cagliari	130	(5)
1994–1995	Perugia	31	(3)
Total		486	(34)

International career
1986–1988	Italy	6	(0)
- * Club domestic league appearances and goals

Gianfranco Matteoli (Italian pronunciation: [dʒaɱˈfraŋko matteˈɔːli]; born 21 April 1959) is an Italian retired footballer who played as a midfielder. He currently works as Head of the Youth sector at Serie A club Cagliari.

== Club career ==
During his club career, Matteoli played for Italian sides Cantu San Paolo, Como, Osimana, Reggiana, Sampdoria, Internazionale, Cagliari and Perugia.

== Honours ==
=== Player ===
Inter Milan

- Serie A: 1988–89
- Italian Super Cup: 1989

Como

- Serie C: 1978–79

== International career ==
At international level, Matteoli earned 6 caps for the Italy national football team between 1986 and 1987.
