= Regina Baresi =

Italian footballer (born 1991)

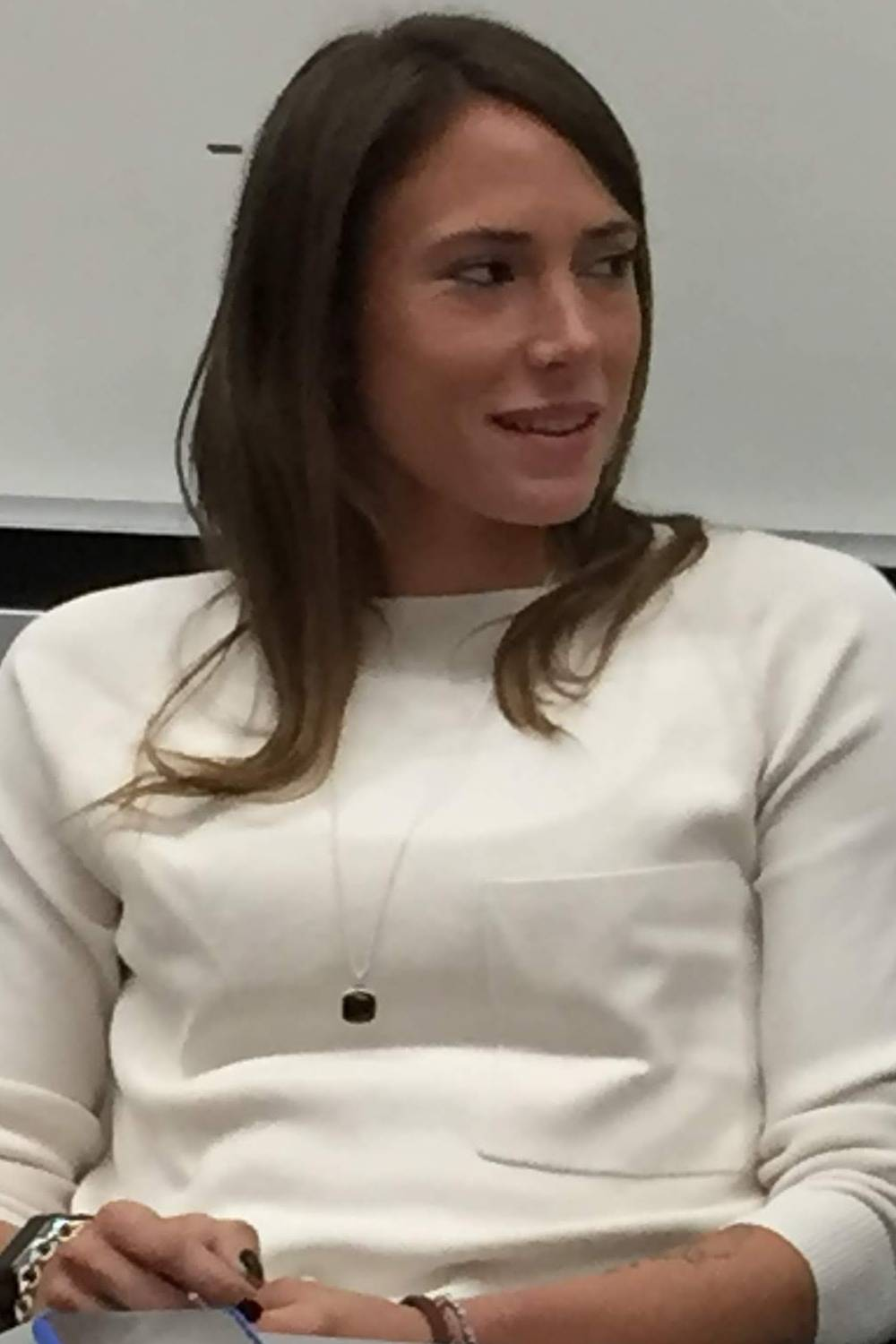
- Baresi in 2019

Personal information
- Full name: Regina Elena Baresi
- Date of birth: 26 September 1991 (age 35)
- Place of birth: Milan, Italy
- Height: 1.76 m (5 ft 9 in)
- Position: Striker

Youth career
- 2003–2009: Inter Milano

Senior career*
Years	Team	Apps	(Gls)
2009–2018	Inter Milano	208	(108)
2018–2021	Inter Milan	43	(11)
- * Club domestic league appearances and goals

Regina Elena Baresi (born 26 September 1991) is a former Italian footballer who played as a striker.

== Early life ==
Baresi is the daughter of Giuseppe Baresi, former Inter Milan captain, and niece of Franco Baresi, who captained AC Milan.

== Club career ==
After practicing different sports as a child, at the age of 12, Baresi joined the youth team of Inter Milano. In 2009, the team was promoted to the first team and soon she became their captain. In 2013, she won the Serie A2 championship with the Nerazzurri, obtaining promotion to Serie A; the following year, however, they were unable to avoid the team's immediate relegation. For the following four years, therefore, she regularly plays in the cadet series with the Milanese team.

During the 2018–19 season she became the first captain of the newly formed women's section of Inter Milan, established following the purchase of the sports title from Inter Milano; in the same year she participated in the victory of the Serie B championship and the historic promotion of the Nerazzurri team in Serie A.

== Personal life ==
In addition to sports, Baresi works as a television commentator, having taken part in broadcasts such as La moviola is the same for everyone on Mediaset Premium, and Quelli che il calcio and La Domenica Sportiva on Rai 2, and commented on Rai 1 for the 2019 FIFA Women's World Cup. Her girlfriend is football player Julie Debever.

== Honours ==
Inter Milano

- Serie A2: 2012–13

Inter Milan

- Serie B: 2018–19
