= Astutillo Malgioglio =

Italian footballer (born 1958)

Personal information
- Date of birth: 3 May 1958 (age 68)
- Place of birth: Piacenza, Italy
- Height: 1.80 m (5 ft 11 in)
- Position: Goalkeeper

Senior career*
Years	Team	Apps	(Gls)
1974–1975	Cremonese	0	(0)
1975–1977	Bologna	1	(0)
1977–1982	Brescia	159	(0)
1982–1983	Pistoiese	31	(0)
1983–1985	Roma	1	(0)
1985–1986	Lazio	20	(0)
1986–1991	Inter Milan	12	(0)
1992	Atalanta	0	(0)
Total		224	(0)
- * Club domestic league appearances and goals

Astutillo Malgioglio (born 3 May 1958) is an Italian former professional footballer who played as a goalkeeper. He made 224 appearances in the top two divisions of Italian football, 44 of which were in Serie A.

== Honours ==
Roma

- Coppa Italia: 1983–84

Inter

- Serie A: 1988–89
- Supercoppa Italiana: 1989
- UEFA Cup: 1990–91

Individual

- Inter Milan Hall of Fame: 2019
