= Alessandro Bianchi (footballer, born 1966) =

Italian footballer (born 1966)

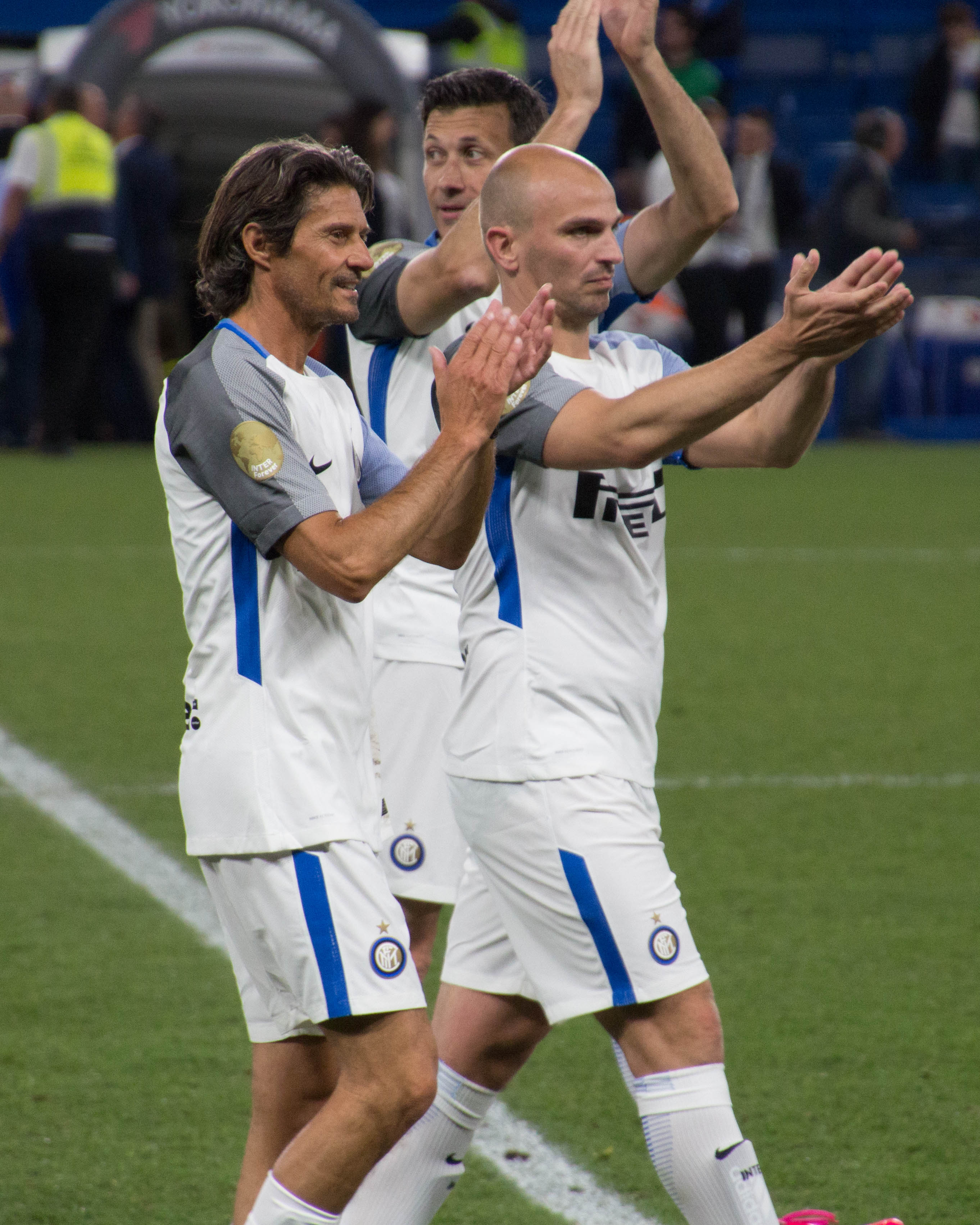

Personal information
- Date of birth: 7 April 1966 (age 60)
- Place of birth: Cervia, Italy
- Height: 1.74 m (5 ft 9 in)
- Position: Midfielder

Senior career*
Years	Team	Apps	(Gls)
1983–1988	Cesena	40	(3)
1986–1987	→ Padova (loan)	28	(0)
1988–1996	Internazionale	178	(9)
1996–2001	Cesena	130	(1)
Total		376	(13)

International career
1992–1993	Italy	9	(0)
- * Club domestic league appearances and goals

Alessandro Bianchi (Italian pronunciation: [alesˈsandro ˈbjaŋki]; born 7 April 1966) is an Italian former professional footballer who played as a midfielder or as forward, in the position of right winger.

== Club career ==
Bianchi spent most of his career with Cesena, making his professional debut during the 1985–86 Serie B season and also retiring with the club in 2001, and with Inter. He spent the 1986–87 season on loan with Padova in Serie C before returning to Cesena, and he transferred to Inter for 4.5 billion Lit. in 1988. With Inter, he was notably a member of the starting line-up that won the record-breaking 1988–89 Serie A title, although, despite his talent, a serious muscle injury during the 1992–93 season greatly affected his career at the age of 27. He remained at the club until 1996, also winning the 1989 Supercoppa Italiana, and two UEFA Cups (1990–91 and 1993–94) during his time at Inter, notably scoring a decisive goal against Aston Villa in the round of 16 of the 1990–91 edition of the UEFA Cup.

After his stint with Inter, he returned once again to Cesena in Serie B, where he remained until his retirement from professional football. After his retirement, he still remained active as a footballer, and in 2010, he played in the Cervia Over-35 team as a midfielder, and during the 2012–13 season, he took part in the Umbro Second Division League with Eugubina Calcio.

== International career ==
Bianchi also represented the Italy national football team on 9 occasions between 1992 and 1994. He made his international debut under manager Arrigo Sacchi on 19 February 1992, in a 4–0 international friendly home victory over San Marino in Cesena.

== Honours ==
=== Club ===
Inter

- Serie A: 1988–89
- Supercoppa Italiana: 1989
- UEFA Cup: 1990–91, 1993–94
