= Achille Rivolta =

Italian philatelist

Dr. Achille Rivolta (1908 – 30 May 1992) was a philatelist who signed the Roll of Distinguished Philatelists at Buxton in 1968.
