= Dario Morello =

Italian footballer (born 1968)

Personal information
- Date of birth: 11 January 1968 (age 58)
- Place of birth: Lecce, Italy
- Height: 1.75 m (5 ft 9 in)
- Position: Midfielder

Senior career*
Years	Team	Apps	(Gls)
1987–1990	Internazionale	32	(1)
1990–1994	Reggiana	138	(20)
1994–1996	Bologna	65	(12)
1996–1998	Genoa	57	(8)
1998–2000	Reggiana	37	(4)
2001	Viterbese	2	(0)
2002	Dundee	0	(0)
2002–2003	Brescello	26	(1)
2003–2004	Sassuolo	15	(0)
- * Club domestic league appearances and goals

Dario Morello (born 11 January 1968, in Lecce) is an Italian former professional footballer who played as a midfielder.

== Honours ==
Inter

- Serie A champion: 1988–89
- Supercoppa Italiana winner: 1989
