= Alberto Rivolta =

Italian footballer (1967–2019)

Personal information
- Date of birth: 4 November 1967
- Place of birth: Lissone, Italy
- Date of death: 3 November 2019 (aged 51)
- Place of death: Monza, Italy
- Height: 1.74 m (5 ft 9 in)
- Position: Defender

Senior career*
Years	Team	Apps	(Gls)
1985–1989	Internazionale	4	(0)
1987–1988	→ Parma (loan)	5	(0)
1989–1991	Livorno	13	(1)
1991–1992	Seregno	3	(1)

International career
1987	Italy U20		
- * Club domestic league appearances and goals

Alberto Rivolta (4 November 1967 – 3 November 2019) was an Italian professional footballer who played as a defender. He was a member of the Internazionale team that won the 1988–89 Serie A title, making one 12-minute appearance in the penultimate away game of the season against Torino. However, injuries and loss of form forced him into an early retirement by 1992 at the age of just 24. In 1994, he was diagnosed with ependymoma, an illness that would eventually cause his death in 2019. He also played for Parma, Livorno and Seregno. Internationally, he was a member of the Italian under-20 squad at the 1987 FIFA World Youth Championship.

== Honours ==
Inter

- Serie A champions: 1988–89
