= Pierluigi Di Già =

Italian footballer

Personal information
- Date of birth: 22 March 1968 (age 58)
- Place of birth: Milan, Italy
- Height: 1.74 m (5 ft 8 1/2 in)
- Position: Midfielder

Senior career*
Years	Team	Apps	(Gls)
1986–1990	Internazionale	11	(0)
1987–1989	→ Parma (loan)	63	(2)
1990–1992	Bologna	62	(1)
1992–1995	Venezia	70	(6)
1995–1997	Palermo	58	(2)
1997–1998	Pescara	22	(1)
1998–1999	Marsala	11	(0)
1999–2000	Marconi Stallions	8	(0)
2000–2001	Reggiana	3	(0)
2001–2002	Villacidrese	11	(0)
2002–2003	Tivoli	3	(0)
- * Club domestic league appearances and goals

Pierluigi Di Già (born 22 March 1968 in Milan) is a retired Italian professional footballer who played as a midfielder.
