= Enrico Cucchi =

Italian footballer (1965-1996)

Personal information
- Date of birth: 2 August 1965
- Place of birth: Savona, Italy
- Date of death: 4 March 1996 (aged 30)
- Place of death: Tortona, Italy
- Height: 1.78 m (5 ft 10 in)
- Position: Midfielder

Senior career*
Years	Team	Apps	(Gls)
1981–1982	Savona	25	(1)
1982–1990	Internazionale	61	(1)
1987–1988	→ Empoli (loan)	26	(8)
1988–1989	→ Fiorentina (loan)	32	(4)
1990–1993	Bari	67	(6)
1993–1995	Ravenna	5	(0)
- * Club domestic league appearances and goals

Enrico Cucchi (2 August 1965 – 4 March 1996) was an Italian professional football player, who played as a midfielder.

== Career ==
Enrico Cucchi made his professional debut in 1981 with Savona in Serie C2, which was coached by his father Piero at the time. In 1982, he was sold to Inter and he made his Serie A debut with the club three years later, on 13 January 1985, in a 1–1 away draw against Ascoli. He became a permanent first-team member the subsequent season, making 22 appearances, and scoring a goal against Lecce, also making his European debut with the club in the UEFA Cup. After the 1986–87 season, he spent the next two seasons on loan at Empoli and Fiorentina, before returning to Inter again in 1989. During the 1989–90 season, he scored in Inter's 2–0 victory over Sampdoria in the 1989 Supercoppa Italiana. He was sold to Bari the following season, where his career declined due to illness. He was operated on his thigh due to a growing mole, which was later revealed to be melanoma. He spent his final season with Ravenna during the 1993–94 Serie B season, making only 5 appearances due to his illness, before retiring in 1995.

== Style of play ==
Cucchi was a talented, well-rounded and versatile midfielder, who excelled at intercepting passes and breaking down opposing plays, although he was also gifted with good vision, technique, and a powerful shot from distance.

== Personal life ==
Enrico's father, Piero Cucchi, also played football professionally, later working as a coach. In addition to his footballing career, Enrico also studied law. He died on 4 March 1996 in Tortona of stomach cancer, at the age of 30; he is survived by his wife, Sabrina. Following his death, an association for palliative care was opened in his name.

== Honours ==
Inter

- Supercoppa Italiana winner: 1989.
