= Riccardo Ferri =

Italian footballer (born 1963)

Personal information
- Full name: Riccardo Ferri
- Date of birth: 20 August 1963 (age 63)
- Place of birth: Crema, Italy
- Height: 1.85 m (6 ft 1 in)
- Position: Defender

Senior career*
Years	Team	Apps	(Gls)
1981–1994	Inter Milan	290	(6)
1994–1996	Sampdoria	36	(0)
Total		326	(6)

International career
1986–1992	Italy	45	(4)
Medal record
Men's football
Representing Italy
FIFA World Cup
Third place	1990 Italy
- * Club domestic league appearances and goals

Riccardo Ferri Cavaliere OMRI (Italian pronunciation: [rikˈkardo ˈfɛrri]; born 20 August 1963) is an Italian former footballer who played as a defender, in the role of centre-back. At international level, he represented Italy at the 1984 Summer Olympics, at UEFA Euro 1988, and at the 1990 FIFA World Cup.

His older brother, Giacomo, was also a footballer and is currently a member of the technical staff at Torino.

== Club career ==
Ferri was born in Crema, in Lombardy, and debuted in Serie A with Inter Milan in October 1981. Soon a first-team defender, he became a mainstay of the team's starting eleven, playing for Internazionale for a total of 13 seasons.

With Inter, he won the 1981–82 Coppa Italia, followed by Inter's record breaking Scudetto and 1989 Supercoppa Italiana win during the 1988–89 Serie A season, and two UEFA Cups; the first in 1991, and the second in 1994. In 1994, he went to Sampdoria together with teammate Walter Zenga, in exchange for Gianluca Pagliuca, retiring two seasons later.

== International career ==
After representing his country at under-21 level in the 1984 (third place) and 1986 (second place) under-21 European championships, Ferri went on to receive 45 caps for Italy senior national team, scoring 4 goals. He made his senior international debut on 6 December 1986, in a 2–0 away win against Malta, marking his first international appearance by scoring a goal; he made his final Italy appearance in 1992. He played for Italy in Euro 1988, where Italy reached the semi-finals, and in the 1990 World Cup on home soil, where Italy managed a third-place finish after a penalty shoot-out defeat to defending champions Argentina in the semi-finals. He also competed for Italy at the 1984 Summer Olympics, where Italy finished in fourth place after a semi-final defeat.

== Style of play ==
A world-class, tenacious, and combative defender, with excellent man-marking abilities, Ferri usually played in the role of centre-back. Although he possessed good technique, he preferred to mainly focus on the defensive aspect of the game rather than attempting to build plays from the back; however, he occasionally took free-kicks. He also excelled in the air and was known for his ability to anticipate his opponents. The Dutch former AC Milan striker Marco van Basten named Ferri and Pietro Vierchowod as two of the best defenders he ever faced.

== Coaching career ==
Riccardo Ferri was in charge of the Inter Academy Florida based in Broward County, Florida (north of Miami), before being appointed to the role of Inter Club Manager on 25 July 2022, replacing Lele Oriali.

== Honours ==
Inter Milan

- Serie A: 1988–89
- Coppa Italia: 1981–82
- Supercoppa Italiana: 1989
- UEFA Cup: 1990–91, 1993–94

Italy

- FIFA World Cup: 1990 (third place)

Individual

- Pirata d'Oro (Internazionale Player Of The Year): 1988
- World XI: 1990, 1991

Orders

- 5th Class / Knight: Cavaliere Ordine al Merito della Repubblica Italiana: 1991
