= Massimo Ciocci =

Italian footballer and coach

Personal information
- Date of birth: 25 February 1968 (age 58)
- Place of birth: Corridonia, Italy
- Height: 1.71 m (5 ft 7 1/2 in)
- Position: Striker

Team information
- Current team: Corridonia Calcio (Manager)

Senior career*
| Years | Team | Apps | (Gls) |
| 1985–1988 | Inter | 26 | (5) |
| 1988–1989 | Padova | 29 | (5) |
| 1989–1990 | Ancona | 33 | (18) |
| 1990–1991 | Cesena | 33 | (13) |
| 1991–1992 | Inter | 28 | (1) |
| 1992–1993 | SPAL | 34 | (5) |
| 1993–1995 | Genoa | 18 | (3) |
| 1995–1996 | Padova | 18 | (2) |
| 1997–1998 | Pistoiese | 21 | (2) |
| 1998–2000 | Verbania | 53 | (23) |
| 2000–2001 | Borgosesia | 6 | (3) |
| 2001–2003 | Val di Sangro | 33 | (15) |

Managerial career
- 2002–2003: ASD Arona
- 2003–2004: Corridonia Calcio
- 2004–2006: Lorese Calcio
- 2006–2007: Chiesanuova di Treia
- 2007–2009: US Trodica
- 2009: Tolentino
- 2018–2020: Jiangsu (U-14)
- 2020–2021: Civitanovese
- 2021–: Corridonia Calcio
- * Club domestic league appearances and goals

Massimo Ciocci (born 25 February 1968 in Corridonia) is a former Italian professional football player and current manager of Corridonia Calcio.

== Career ==
=== Coaching career ===
After retiring as a player, Ciocci opens a tobacconist's shop in the center of Corridonia and was later also struck by an intestinal tumor from which he recovered. He later began his coaching career with ASD Arona (Eccellenza) and later also coached Corridonia Calcio (Promozione), Lorese Calcio (Prima Categoria), Chiesanuova di Treia (Prima Categoria), US Trodica (Promozione/Eccellenza) and Tolentino (Eccellenza).

From 2010 to 2012, Ciocci worked as a general manager at Corridonia Calcio. In 2010, he also helped Inter scouting in the United Arab Emirates and in India in 2012.

In January 2013, Ciocci became the technical manager of Inter's Academy in Japan, which he was in charge of until June 2017. In February 2018, he was hired on as a U-14 manager at Inter's Chinese sister club, Jiangsu FC.

In March 2020, he became the manager of Civitanovese before he was fired in June 2021. He then, shortly ahead of the 2021-22 season, returned to Corridonia Calcio.
