= Giuseppe Baresi =

Italian football player and coach (born 1958)

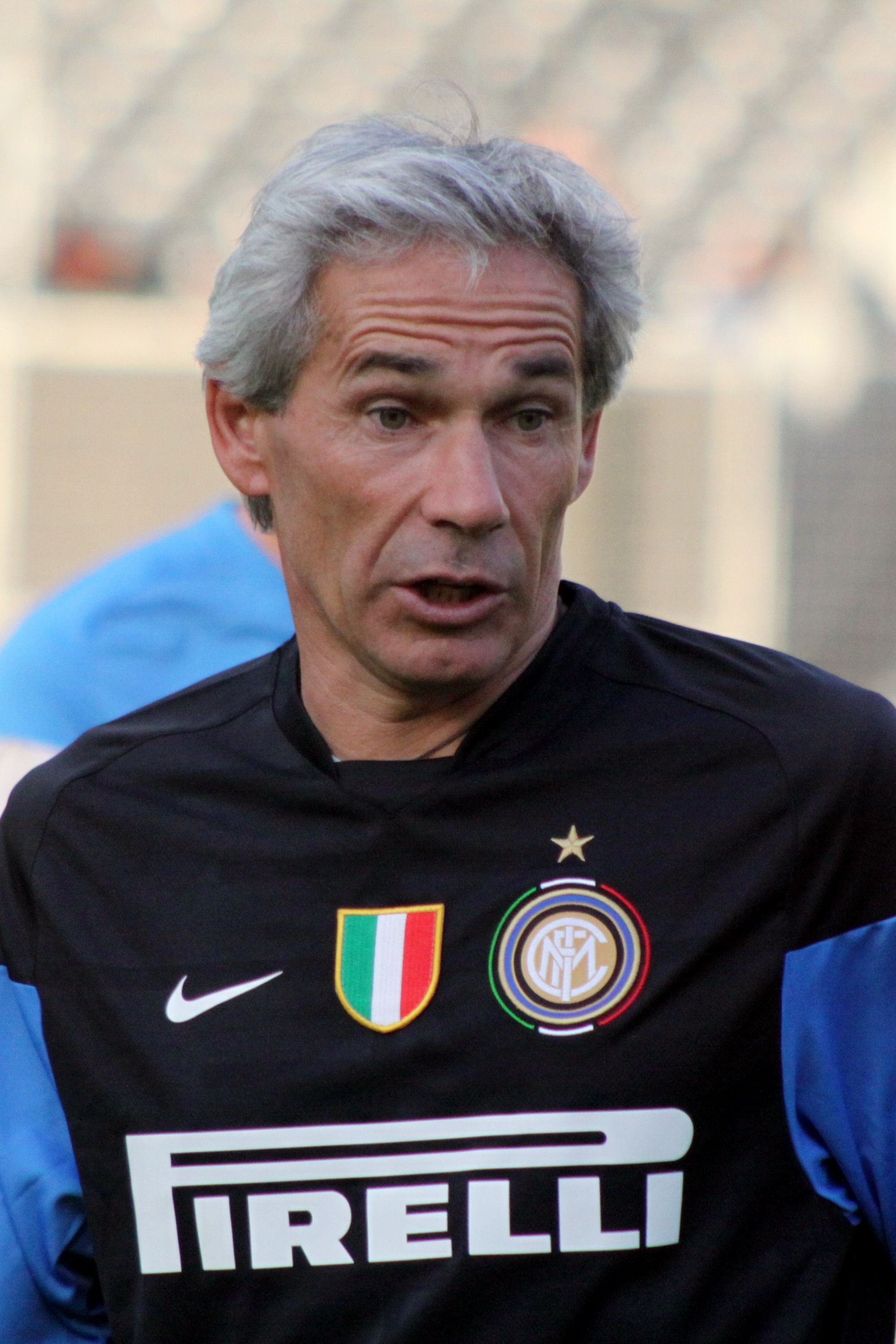
- Baresi as a coach with Inter in 2009

Personal information
- Date of birth: 7 February 1958 (age 68)
- Place of birth: Travagliato, Brescia, Italy
- Height: 1.77 m (5 ft 10 in)
- Positions: Defensive midfielder; defender

Youth career
- 1971–1976: Inter Milan

Senior career*
Years	Team	Apps	(Gls)
1976–1992	Inter Milan	392	(10)
1992–1994	Modena	73	(0)
Total		465	(10)

International career
1979–1986	Italy	18	(0)

Managerial career
- 2008–2014: Inter Milan (assistant)
- * Club domestic league appearances and goals

Giuseppe Baresi (Italian pronunciation: [dʒuˈzɛppe baˈreːzi, -eːsi]; born 7 February 1958) is an Italian football manager and former player, who played as a defender or as a defensive midfielder. Baresi spent the majority of his 18-year career with Inter, before retiring in 1994 after two seasons with Modena. With Inter, he won two Serie A titles and the UEFA Cup, among other trophies, and also served as the team's captain. At international level, he represented the Italy national team on 18 occasions between 1979 and 1986, taking part at UEFA Euro 1980, where they finished in fourth place, and at the 1986 FIFA World Cup. His younger brother, Franco Baresi, also a defender, served as captain for city rivals A.C. Milan and the Italy national side.

== Club career ==
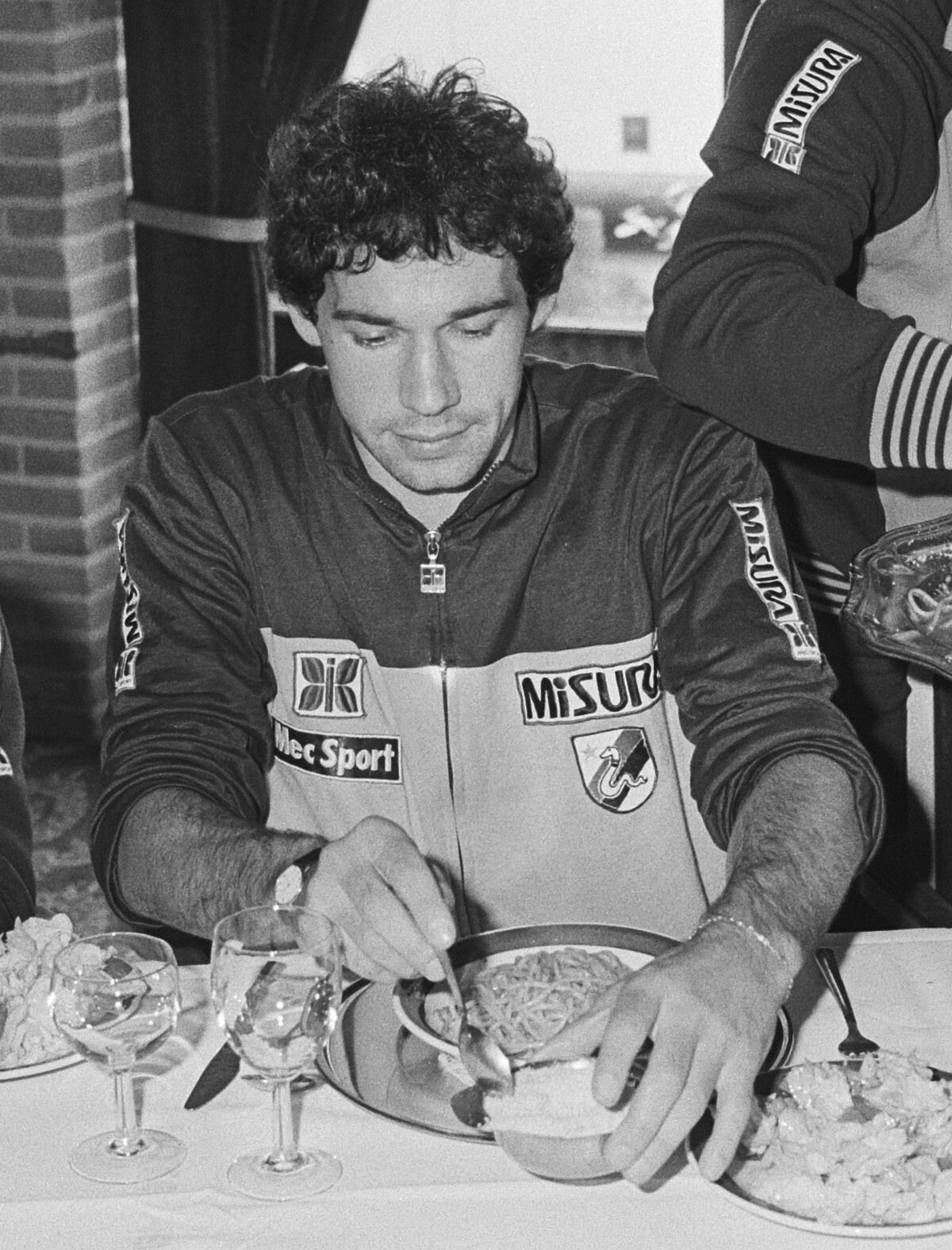
Baresi with Inter Milan in 1982

Born in Travagliato, a province of Brescia, Baresi was acquired by Inter as a youngster, and became a member of the team's youth system. He made his professional debut with the senior side in the Coppa Italia on 8 June 1977, in a 1–0 win over Juventus during the 1976–77 season, and made his Serie A debut the following season. He later went on to captain the club from 1988 to 1992, and he spent a total of 16 seasons with Inter Milan, playing a total of 559 matches (including 392 Serie A matches, 73 European matches and 94 Coppa Italia matches), and scoring 13 goals (ten in Serie A, one in European matches, and two in the Coppa Italia). With Inter, he won two Serie A titles, two Italian Cups, an UEFA Cup, and the Supercoppa Italiana. After leaving Inter at the end of the 1991–92 season, Baresi also played for Modena in the Serie B for a couple of seasons, before retiring in 1994 at the age of 36.

== International career ==
A long-standing nerazzurro, he also served as Inter's captain for four seasons, winning several trophies both domestically and internationally. Despite his club success, Baresi achieved little success at the national team level, unlike his younger brother, only playing 18 matches with the Azzurri shirt between 1979 and 1986, being also surpassed in notoriety by his more famous brother Franco, who played for crosstown city rivals A.C. Milan. After representing the under-20 side in the 1977 Under-20 World Cup, and the under-21 side in the 1978 and 1980 European championships, Baresi was a member of Italy's senior squad at the UEFA 1980 European Championship, on home soil, alongside his brother. This was the only time that the two brothers were both selected for a major tournament with Italy, although only Giuseppe would make appearances in the competition, as Italy managed to reach the semi-finals, finishing in fourth place. Despite being called up for the 1982 World Cup qualifiers by manager Enzo Bearzot, Baresi was left out of the final squad for his brother Franco; although the team went on to win the trophy, Franco did not make a single appearance throughout the tournament. Baresi was also a starting member of Italy's 1986 World Cup squad, which was eliminated in the round of 16.

== Coaching career ==
After serving as head of Inter's club youth system, he was appointed as an assistant to new manager José Mourinho on 2 June 2008. After Benitez was appointed, he brought his own assistant coach Mauricio Pellegrino, while Baresi became a technical assistant. He returned to that position after Benitez was sacked and replaced by Leonardo. At the start of 2011–12 Serie A, Gian Piero Gasperini brought his own assistant coach Bruno Caneo from Genoa, but he was sacked in September. Claudio Ranieri replaced Gasperini, and Baresi was once again became an assistant. When Roberto Mancini joined as head coach in 2014, Baresi was responsible for scouting, and followed the development of players in the various Inter academies worldwide.

== Style of play ==
"A tenacious ball-winner, with an excellent ability to read the game, Baresi was regarded as one of the best and most versatile Italian defenders of his generation, as he was capable of playing as a full-back, or as a defensive midfielder, in addition to his natural centre-back role, due to his stamina."

== Personal life ==
He is the older brother of defender, and legendary A.C. Milan captain, Franco Baresi. As youngsters, both had tryouts for Inter, but Franco was rejected, and purchased by local rivals Milan; as he was the younger player, he was initially known as "Baresi 2". Due to Franco's great success and popularity later in his career, however, Giuseppe became known as "the other Baresi". His daughter Regina is also a former footballer; she played as striker and was captain of Inter Women.

Baresi's brother Franco died on 31 July 2026.

== Honours ==
=== Player ===
Inter Milan

- Serie A: 1979–80, 1988–89
- Coppa Italia: 1977–78, 1981–82
- Supercoppa Italiana: 1989
- UEFA Cup: 1990–91

Individual

- Pirata d'Oro (Inter Milan Player of the Year): 1986
- Premio Nazionale Carriera Esemplare "Gaetano Scirea": 1992

=== Assistant Manager ===
Inter Milan

- Serie A: 2008–09, 2009–10
- Supercoppa Italiana: 2008
- Coppa Italia: 2009–10, 2010–11
- UEFA Champions League: 2009–10
