= Aldo Serena =

Italian footballer (born 1960)

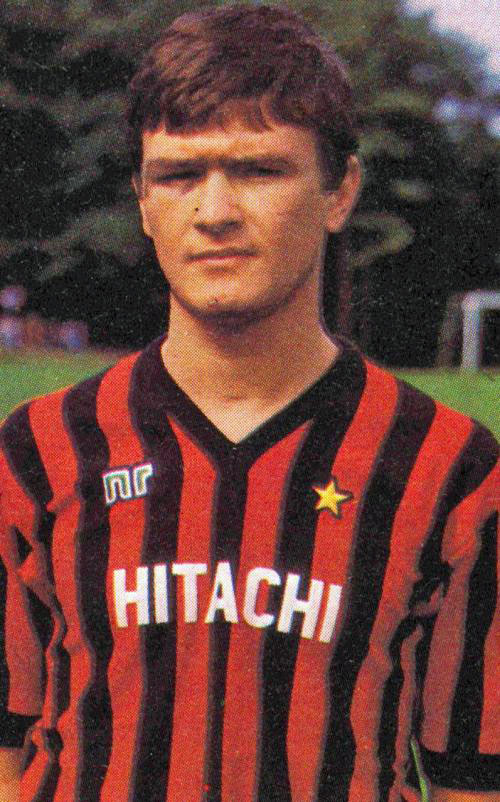

Personal information
- Full name: Aldo Serena
- Date of birth: 25 June 1960 (age 66)
- Place of birth: Montebelluna, Italy
- Height: 1.83 m (6 ft 0 in)
- Position: Forward

Senior career*
Years	Team	Apps	(Gls)
1977–1978	Montebelluna	29	(9)
1978–1985	Internazionale	51	(11)
1979–1980	→ Como (loan)	18	(2)
1980–1981	→ Bari (loan)	35	(10)
1982–1983	→ A.C. Milan (loan)	20	(8)
1984–1985	→ Torino (loan)	29	(9)
1985–1987	Juventus	51	(21)
1987–1991	Internazionale	114	(45)
1991–1993	A.C. Milan	10	(0)
Total		357	(115)

International career
1984–1990	Italy	24	(5)
Medal record
Men's football
Representing Italy
FIFA World Cup
Third place	1990 Italy
- * Club domestic league appearances and goals

Aldo Serena Cavaliere OMRI (Italian pronunciation: [ˈaldo seˈreːna]; born 25 June 1960) is an Italian former professional footballer, who was usually deployed as a forward. He played for several Italian clubs throughout his career, winning four Serie A titles, among other trophies. Serena won several trophies with Inter, including a league title and the UEFA Cup.

At international level, Serena played for the Italy national team in the 1986 FIFA World Cup and the 1990 FIFA World Cup, helping the team to a third-place finish in the latter tournament. He works as a pundit for Mediaset.

== Club career ==
=== Early career ===
During his career, Serena played for numerous Italian clubs, including Montebelluna, Inter, Como, Bari, A.C. Milan, Juventus and Torino. Born in Montebelluna, in the province of Treviso, he spent his youth playing with his hometown side's youth academy. After making his professional debut with the Montebelluna senior team in Serie D in 1977, and scoring nine goals in 29 appearances during his debut season, Serena first joined Inter the following season in 1978. He made his Serie A debut the same year on 19 November in a 4–0 home victory against Lazio, marking the occasion with his first Serie A goal, as well as making another league appearance later that the season.

Although Serena initially won the 1981–82 Coppa Italia during his first spell with the club, he mainly served as a back-up, and was initially loaned out to several other Italian clubs, spending seasons on loan with Como, Bari, cross-city rivals Milan, and Torino. He also enjoyed a successful two-season spell with rivals Juventus between 1985 and 1987, scoring 21 Serie A goals in 51 appearances, as well as winning the 1985 Intercontinental Cup and the 1985–86 Serie A title. In total, Serena scored 36 goals in all competitions for the Turin side in 71 appearances.

=== Milan arrival ===
Serena enjoyed greater success after returning to Inter for his second spell in 1987. His best season with the Milan-side came during the 1988–89 campaign under manager Giovanni Trapattoni, when he won the Scudetto with Inter with a record 58 points (the club's thirteenth Serie A title overall), and was crowned top scorer of the league, scoring 22 goals. He also later won the 1989 Supercoppa Italiana and the 1990–91 UEFA Cup during his second spell with the club.

After his second move to local rivals Milan in 1991, Serena's reputation as an Inter legend was somewhat tarnished, however; this was shown recently when Serena's name was booed by some of Inter's Ultras supporters when it was announced that he was to be part of an Inter Legends gathering after the final game of the 2006–07 league trophy presentation. Although Serena's first spell with Milan saw him help the team win the Serie B title and achieve Serie A promotion in 1983, as he scored eight goals in 20 appearances, his second spell with Milan was less successful; despite winning another Supercoppa Italiana in 1992, and another two Serie A titles in 1992 and 1993 under manager Fabio Capello, he was used with less frequency due to several injury struggles, only making ten appearances over his two final seasons, and he failed to score in Serie A during his second spell with the club, ultimately retiring from professional football in 1993.

In 2005, Serena and Christian Vieri were the only footballers to have played for both of the rival teams of Turin and Milan. The former is also one of six footballers to win the Serie A title with three clubs, a feat he managed with Juventus, Inter, and Milan, whilst the others to have achieved the same feat are Giovanni Ferrari, Filippo Cavalli, Pietro Fanna, Sergio Gori and Attilio Lombardo.

== International career ==
Serena played for the Italy national football team in two World Cups: the 1986 FIFA World Cup and 1990 FIFA World Cup on home soil, where Italy finished in third place, but he did not make a single appearance in the former tournament. Serena also played for the Italian under-23 team at the 1984 Summer Olympics, helping the team to a fourth-place finish. On 8 December 1984, he debuted in a 2–0 friendly victory against Poland in Pescara. Serena scored his first goal for Italy on 5 February 1986, in a 2–1 friendly victory against West Germany in Avellino. In total, he earned 24 appearances and scored five goals for the Italian senior squad.

At the 1990 World Cup in home soil, Serena scored with a header on his 30th birthday in Italy's 2–0 round of 16 win over Uruguay on 25 June. In the semi-final match, he left the pitch in tears after he missed a crucial spot kick in the semi-final shoot-out against Argentina, with the goalkeeper Sergio Goycochea saving the ball to his left, a game the home nation lost on penalties following a 1–1 draw after extra-time. Serena later insisted that he did not want to take a penalty in the shootout, but that he was forced to be included as Italy's final penalty taker by manager Azeglio Vicini, as no one else had volunteered. Italy won the third place match against England 2–1, however, capturing the bronze medal. Serena made his final appearance for Italy on 22 December 1990, scoring two goals in a 4–0 win over Cyprus.

== Style of play ==
Serena was a centre-forward who excelled in the air; a former defensive midfielder and a basketball player in his youth. He was known in particular for his powerful and accurate heading ability, due to his height, as well as his positional sense, and style of play with his back to goal, which enabled him to shield the ball from defenders, create space in the area, anticipate opponents, and win aerial challenges, despite his lack of notable pace. He was also capable of finishing with his left foot. Primarily a striker who mainly operated in the penalty area, he was a versatile player, who was also capable of playing as a second striker or as a winger.

== Honours ==
Juventus

- Serie A: 1985–86
- Intercontinental Cup: 1985

Inter

- Serie A: 1988–89
- Coppa Italia: 1981–82
- Supercoppa Italiana: 1989
- UEFA Cup: 1990–91

Milan

- Serie A: 1991–92, 1992–93
- Supercoppa Italiana: 1992

Italy

- FIFA World Cup: third place 1990

Individual

- Serie A Top Goal Scorer: 1988–89

Orders

- 5th Class / Knight: Cavaliere Ordine al Merito della Repubblica Italiana: 1991
