= 1988–89 Serie A =

87th season of top-tier Italian football

Serie A
- Season: 1988–89
- Dates: 9 October 1988 – 25 June 1989
- Champions: Inter; 13th title
- Relegated: Torino; Pescara; Pisa; Como
- European Cup: Inter; Milan
- Cup Winners' Cup: Sampdoria
- UEFA Cup: Napoli; Juventus; Atalanta; Fiorentina
- Matches: 306
- Goals: 645 (2.11 per match)
- Top goalscorer: Aldo Serena (22 goals)
- Longest winning run: 26 matches Inter
- Longest unbeaten run: 21 matches Milan
- Longest winless run: 5 wins Lazio
- Longest losing run: 18 matches Como

Serie A 1988-89 team distribution

The 1988–89 Serie A was won by Inter, who won the title comfortably by an 11-point margin over runners-up Napoli. Milan's triumph in the European Cup meant Italy would be entering two teams – both the two Milan sides – into the European Cup for the 1989–90 season. Torino, Pescara, Pisa and Como were relegated to Serie B.

== Teams ==
Bologna, Lecce, Lazio and Atalanta had been promoted from Serie B.

== Events ==
Following the expansion of the league, a fourth relegation was added.

== Final classification ==
Pos	Team	Pld	W	D	L	GF	GA	GD	Pts	Qualification or relegation
1	Internazionale (C)	34	26	6	2	67	19	+48	58	Qualification to European Cup
2	Napoli	34	18	11	5	57	28	+29	47	Qualification to UEFA Cup
3	Milan (Note: Milan qualified for the 1989–90 European Cup as the 1988–89 European Cup defending champions.)	34	16	14	4	61	25	+36	46	Qualification to European Cup
4	Juventus	34	15	13	6	51	36	+15	43	Qualification to UEFA Cup
5	Sampdoria	34	14	11	9	43	25	+18	39	Qualification to Cup Winners' Cup
6	Atalanta	34	11	14	9	37	32	+5	36	Qualification to UEFA Cup
7	Fiorentina (Note: AC Fiorentina won the UEFA Cup qualification match against AS Roma then qualified to 1989–90 UEFA Cup.)	34	12	10	12	44	43	+1	34	Qualification to UEFA Cup
8	Roma	34	11	12	11	33	40	−7	34	
9	Lecce	34	8	15	11	25	35	−10	31	
10	Lazio	34	5	19	10	23	32	−9	29	
11	Hellas Verona	34	5	19	10	18	27	−9	29	
12	Ascoli	34	9	11	14	30	41	−11	29	
13	Cesena	34	8	13	13	24	39	−15	29	
14	Bologna	34	8	13	13	26	43	−17	29	
15	Torino (R)	34	8	11	15	37	49	−12	27	Relegation to Serie B
16	Pescara (R)	34	5	17	12	28	43	−15	27	Relegation to Serie B
17	Pisa (R)	34	6	11	17	17	39	−22	23	Relegation to Serie B
18	Como (R)	34	6	10	18	24	49	−25	22	Relegation to Serie B

Source: 1988–89 Serie A, RSSSF.com
Rules for classification: 1) Points; 2) Head-to-head points; 3) Head-to-head goal difference; 4) Goal difference; 5) Goals scored; 6) Draw.
(C) Champions; (R) Relegated

== Results ==
Home \ Away	ASC	ATA	BOL	CES	COM	FIO	INT	JUV	LAZ	LEC	MIL	NAP	PES	PIS	ROM	SAM	TOR	VER
Ascoli	—	3–1	1–0	1–1	2–0	1–1	1–3	1–1	0–0	1–1	0–2	2–0	0–1	0–1	0–3	2–2	1–0	3–0
Atalanta	1–0	—	2–0	5–1	1–1	0–1	1–1	0–0	3–1	0–0	1–2	1–1	0–0	1–0	2–2	1–0	1–0	2–2
Bologna	1–0	1–1	—	2–2	1–0	1–0	0–6	3–4	0–0	2–1	1–4	1–1	1–0	1–0	0–1	0–0	2–0	0–0
Cesena	2–1	0–0	2–0	—	1–0	0–3	1–2	1–2	0–0	3–2	1–0	0–1	1–0	1–0	1–1	0–0	3–2	0–0
Como	0–1	1–0	1–0	0–0	—	3–2	1–2	0–3	2–1	2–1	1–1	0–1	1–0	1–1	0–1	0–2	2–3	1–1
Fiorentina	2–1	1–1	0–0	4–1	3–1	—	4–3	2–1	3–0	1–1	0–2	1–3	3–2	3–0	2–2	0–2	2–1	1–1
Internazionale	3–1	4–2	1–0	1–0	4–0	2–0	—	1–1	1–0	2–0	0–0	2–1	2–1	4–1	2–0	1–0	2–0	1–0
Juventus	2–0	0–1	2–0	2–2	0–0	1–1	1–1	—	4–2	1–0	0–0	3–5	1–1	3–1	2–1	0–0	1–0	3–0
Lazio	0–0	0–1	0–0	0–0	1–1	1–0	1–3	0–0	—	0–0	1–1	1–1	2–2	1–0	1–0	1–0	1–1	3–1
Lecce	1–2	2–1	1–1	0–0	0–0	0–0	0–3	2–0	1–0	—	1–1	1–0	1–0	1–0	0–0	1–0	3–1	0–0
Milan	5–1	1–2	1–1	0–0	4–0	4–0	0–1	4–0	0–0	2–0	—	0–0	6–1	0–0	4–1	0–0	2–1	1–1
Napoli	4–1	1–0	3–1	1–0	3–2	2–0	0–0	2–4	1–1	4–0	4–1	—	8–2	0–0	1–1	1–1	4–1	1–0
Pescara	0–0	1–1	3–1	3–0	1–1	0–0	0–2	0–0	0–0	1–1	1–3	0–0	—	0–0	3–1	0–1	2–0	0–0
Pisa	0–0	0–1	0–2	1–0	3–1	0–0	0–3	1–4	1–1	1–1	0–2	0–1	1–1	—	1–0	1–1	1–0	1–0
Roma	1–1	2–1	1–1	1–0	1–0	2–1	0–3	1–3	0–0	1–1	1–3	1–0	0–0	2–1	—	1–0	1–3	0–0
Sampdoria	1–0	1–1	4–1	2–0	2–0	1–2	0–1	1–2	1–0	3–0	1–1	0–0	4–1	2–0	0–2	—	5–1	2–1
Torino	1–1	1–1	1–1	2–0	2–1	1–0	2–0	0–0	4–3	0–0	2–2	0–1	1–1	0–0	3–1	2–3	—	1–1
Hellas Verona	0–1	1–0	0–0	0–0	0–0	2–1	0–0	2–0	0–0	2–1	1–2	0–1	0–0	1–0	0–0	1–1	0–0	—

Legend: Blue = home team win; Yellow = draw; Red = away team win.

== UEFA Cup qualification ==
30 June 1989

Fiorentina	1–0	Roma
Pruzzo 11'

Stadio Renato Curi, Perugia
Referee: Arcangelo Pezzella (Frattamaggiore)

Fiorentina qualified for 1989–90 UEFA Cup.

== Top goalscorers ==
Rank	Player	Club	Goals
1	(Italy) Aldo Serena	Internazionale	22
2	(Netherlands) Marco van Basten	Milan	19
2	(Brazil) Careca	Napoli	19
4	(Italy) Roberto Baggio	Fiorentina	15
5	(Italy) Stefano Borgonovo	Fiorentina	14
5	(Italy) Gianluca Vialli	Sampdoria	14
7	(Italy) Andrea Carnevale	Napoli	13
8	(Argentina) Ramón Díaz	Internazionale	12
8	(Portugal) Rui Barros	Juventus	12
10	(Italy) Massimo Agostini	Cesena	11
10	(Brazil) Müller	Torino	11
12	(Germany) Rudi Völler	Roma	10
12	(Italy) Bruno Giordano	Ascoli	10
12	(Italy) Pietro Paolo Virdis	Milan	10
12	(Brazil) Evair	Atalanta	10

- Italy Championship 1988/89 Capocannonieri

== Attendances ==
No.	Club	Average
1	Milan	72,309
2	Napoli	61,793
3	Internazionale	58,175
4	Roma	34,913
5	Lazio	32,125
6	Juventus	30,350
7	Torino	27,551
8	Hellas Verona	25,234
9	Atalanta	24,708
10	Fiorentina	24,553
11	Lecce	22,696
12	Bologna	22,623
13	Pescara	21,910
14	Sampdoria	17,959
15	Cesena	17,320
16	Pisa	13,461
17	Ascoli	12,214
18	Como	10,279

== References and sources ==
- Almanacco Illustrato del Calcio - La Storia 1898-2004, Panini Edizioni,
