= 1994–95 Inter Milan season =

Inter Milan
1994–95 season
- Owner: Massimo Moratti (since 17 February 1995)
- President: Ernesto Pellegrini (until 17 February 1995); Massimo Moratti
- Manager: Ottavio Bianchi
- Stadium: Giuseppe Meazza
- Serie A: 6th
- Coppa Italia: Quarter-finals
- UEFA Cup: Second round
- Top goalscorer: League: Rubén Sosa (8 goals); All: Rubén Sosa (11 goals)
Home colours	Away colours	Third colours

During the 1994–95 season, Inter Milan competed in Serie A, the Coppa Italia and the UEFA Cup.

== Summary ==
In the summer of 1994, striker Marco Delvecchio rejoined the club while Gianluca Pagliuca moved from Sampdoria for a then-world record fee for a goalkeeper of £7 million. Ottavio Bianchi was appointed as first team coach, replacing Gianpiero Marini. Unlike the previous season, Inter Milan did not win any trophies but regained some stability with a sixth place in the domestic league competition. Inter also won the Derby della Madonnina in the league since 1990–91 Season. However, the most significant event of the season saw Massimo Moratti, son of Angelo former President from May 1955 to May 1968 during La Grande Inter era, take charge of the club on 18 February 1995, which reignited the club as a force on the transfer market. The summer of 1995 saw English international Paul Ince and Brazilian starlet Roberto Carlos being bought. The 1994-95 season would be the final at the club for Dennis Bergkamp, Wim Jonk and Rubén Sosa.

=== Overview ===
Competition	Record								Result	Top Scorer
Competition	G	W	D	L	GF	GA	GD	Win %	Result	Top Scorer
Serie A	34	14	10	10	39	34	+5	41.18	6th	(Uruguay) Rubén Sosa, 8
Coppa Italia	7	5	0	2	11	5	+6	71.43	Quarter Finals	(Uruguay) Rubén Sosa, 3
UEFA Cup	2	1	0	1	1	1	+0	50.00	First Round	(Netherlands) Dennis Bergkamp, 1
Total	43	20	10	13	51	40	+11	46.51		(Uruguay) Rubén Sosa, 11

== Squad ==
Note: Flags indicate national team as defined under FIFA eligibility rules; some limited exceptions apply. Players may hold more than one non-FIFA nationality.

Pos.	Nation	Player
GK	ITA	Gianluca Pagliuca
GK	ITA	Marco Fortin
GK	ITA	Luca Mondini
DF	ITA	Giuseppe Bergomi
DF	ITA	Giovanni Bia
DF	ITA	Mirko Conte
DF	ITA	Paolo Tramezzani
DF	ITA	Gianluca Festa
DF	ITA	Massimo Paganin
DF	ITA	Antonio Paganin
MF	NED	Wim Jonk
MF	ITA	Marco Barollo
MF	ITA	Francesco Dell'Anno

Pos.	Nation	Player
MF	ITA	Pierluigi Orlandini
MF	ITA	Angelo Orlando
MF	ITA	Alessandro Bianchi
MF	ITA	Nicola Berti
MF	ITA	Antonio Manicone
MF	ITA	Davide Fontolan
MF	ITA	Andrea Seno
MF	RUS	Igor Shalimov
FW	NED	Dennis Bergkamp
FW	MKD	Darko Pančev
FW	URU	Rubén Sosa
FW	ITA	Marco Delvecchio

=== Transfers ===
In
Pos.	Name	from	Type
GK	Gianluca Pagliuca	Sampdoria	U$6,0 million
DF	Giovanni Bia	Napoli	
MF	Pierluigi Orlandini	Atalanta	U$2,5 million
MF	Andrea Seno	Foggia	U$0,9 million
DF	Stefano Bettarini	Lucchese	re-purchased
DF	Mirko Conte	Venezia	loan ended
DF	Gianluca Festa	Roma	loan ended
DF	Marco Grossi	Maceratese	loan ended
DF	Stefano Ricci	Casarano	loan ended
DF	Stefano Rossini	Udinese	loan ended
DF	Mirko Taccola	Lucchese	loan ended
MF	Marco Barollo	Lecce	loan ended
FW	Marco Delvecchio	Udinese	loan ended
FW	Arturo Di Napoli	Acireale	loan ended
FW	Darko Pančev	VfB Leipzig	loan ended

Out
Pos.	Name	To	Type
GK	Walter Zenga	Sampdoria	
DF	Riccardo Ferri	Sampdoria	
GK	Beniamino Abate	Fidelis Andria	
DF	Sergio Battistini	Brescia	
DF	Stefano Bettarini	Salernitana	
DF	Pasquale Rocco	Pisa	
MF	Pierluigi Di Già	Venezia	
MF	Giuseppe Marino	Modena	
FW	Oliver Bierhoff	Ascoli	
FW	Dario Morello	Reggiana	
GK	Paolo Orlandoni	Casarano	co-ownership
DF	Stefano Ricci	Lecce	loan
DF	Mirko Taccola	Palermo	loan
MF	Fabio Di Sauro	Gualdo	loan
FW	Arturo Di Napoli	Gualdo	loan
FW	Massimo Marazzina	Foggia	loan
FW	Darko Pančev	VfB Leipzig	loan

==== Winter ====
In
Pos.	Name	from	Type

Out
Pos.	Name	To	Type
DF	Paolo Tramezzani	Venezia	loan
MF	Igor Shalimov	MSV Duisburg	loan
MF	Antonio Manicone	Genoa	loan
MF	Marco Barollo	Venezia	loan

== Competitions ==
=== Serie A ===
==== League table ====
Pos	Team	Pld	W	D	L	GF	GA	GD	Pts	Qualification or relegation
4	Milan	34	17	9	8	53	32	+21	60	Qualification to UEFA Cup
5	Roma	34	16	11	7	46	25	+21	59	Qualification to UEFA Cup
6	Internazionale	34	14	10	10	39	34	+5	52	Qualification to UEFA Cup
7	Napoli	34	13	12	9	40	45	−5	51	
8	Sampdoria	34	13	11	10	51	37	+14	50	

Source: Serie A, RSSSF.com, Soccerway
Rules for classification: 1) Points; 2) Head-to-head points; 3) Head-to-head goal difference; 4) Goal difference; 5) Goals scored; 6) Draw. (Note: Head-to-head record is used only after all the matches between the teams in question have been played).

==== Results by round ====
Round	1	2	3	4	5	6	7	8	9	10	11	12	13	14	15	16	17	18	19	20	21	22	23	24	25	26	27	28	29	30	31	32	33	34
Ground	H	A	H	A	H	A	H	A	H	A	H	A	H	H	A	H	A	A	H	A	H	A	H	A	H	A	H	A	H	A	A	H	A	H
Result	W	L	D	W	D	L	D	W	L	D	D	W	L	L	D	W	L	W	L	W	D	D	W	W	W	W	W	L	D	W	L	L	D	W
Position	1	9	9	4	5	10	11	8	8	9	9	7	8	9	11	9	11	10	11	10	11	9	9	7	7	6	5	6	6	6	6	7	6	6

Source: Competitive matches
A = Away; H = Home; W = Win; D = Draw; L = Loss; = Leader, 1995–96 UEFA Champions League Group stage; = 1995–96 UEFA Cup First round

==== Matches ====
4 September 1994 1	Torino	0–2	Inter Milan	Turin
		Report	Sosa 42'; Bergkamp 89'	Stadium: Stadio delle Alpi; Referee: Ceccarini

11 September 1994 2	Inter Milan	0–1	Roma	Milan
		Report	Festa 77' (o.g.)	Stadium: Stadio Giuseppe Meazza

18 September 1994 3	Brescia	0–0	Inter Milan	Brescia
		Report		Stadium: Stadio Mario Rigamonti

25 September 1994 4	Inter Milan	3–1	Fiorentina	Milan
	Pančev 2'; Sosa 27' (pen.), 83'	Report	Batistuta 11'	Stadium: Stadio Giuseppe Meazza

2 October 1994 5	Juventus	0–0	Inter Milan	Turin
		Report		Stadium: Stadio delle Alpi

16 October 1994 6	Inter Milan	1–2	Bari	Milan
	Pančev 76'	Report	Guerrero 2'; Tovalieri 46'	Stadium: Stadio Giuseppe Meazza

23 October 1994 7	Foggia	0–0	Inter Milan	Foggia
		Report

30 October 1994 8	Inter Milan	1–0	Reggiana	Milan
	Delvecchio 89'	Report		Stadium: Stadio Giuseppe Meazza

6 November 1994 9	Genoa	2–1	Inter Milan	Genoa
	van 't Schip 14'; Ruotolo 65'	Report	Delvecchio 44'	Stadium: Stadio Luigi Ferraris

20 November 1994 10	Milan	1–1	Inter Milan	Milan
	Maldini 50'	Report	Fontolan 4'	Stadium: Stadio San Siro

27 November 1994 11	Inter Milan	1–1	Parma	Milan
	Sosa 24' (pen.)	Report	Branca 61'	Stadium: Stadio Giuseppe Meazza

4 December 1994 12	Cremonese	0–1	Inter Milan	Cremona
		Report	Sosa 77'	Stadium: Stadio Giovanni Zini

11 December 1994 13	Inter Milan	0–2	Napoli	Milan
		Report	Jonk 29' (o.g.); André Cruz 67'	Stadium: Stadio Giuseppe Meazza

18 December 1994 14	Inter Milan	0–2	Lazio	Milan
		Report	Cravero 11'; Fuser 43'	Stadium: Stadio Giuseppe Meazza

8 January 1995 15	Cagliari	1–1	Inter Milan	Cagliari
	Muzzi 46'	Report	Sosa 5' (pen.)	Stadium: Stadio Sant'Elia; Referee: Trentalange

15 January 1995 16	Inter Milan	2–0	Sampdoria	Milan
	Festa 57'; Fontolan 67'	Report		Stadium: Stadio Giuseppe Meazza

22 January 1995 17	Padova	1–0	Inter Milan	Padua
	Rosa 86'	Report		Stadium: Stadio Euganeo; Referee: Quartuccio

29 January 1995 18	Inter Milan	2–1	Torino	Milan
	Jonk 50'; Orlandini 90' (pen.)	Report	Silenzi 79'	Stadium: Stadio Giuseppe Meazza

12 February 1995 19	Roma	3–1	Inter Milan	Rome
	Balbo 4', 30', 71'	Report	Seno 14'	Stadium: Stadio Olimpico

19 February 1995 20	Inter Milan	1–0	Brescia	Milan
	Berti 3'	Report		Stadium: Stadio Giuseppe Meazza

26 February 1995 21	Fiorentina	2–2	Inter Milan	Florence
	Rui Costa 43'; Batistuta 75'	Report	Berti 34'; Orlandini 67'	Stadium: Stadio Artemio Franchi

5 March 1995 22	Inter Milan	0–0	Juventus	Milan
		Report		Stadium: Stadio Giuseppe Meazza

12 March 1995 23	Bari	0–1	Inter Milan	Bari
		Report	Dell'Anno 62'	Stadium: Stadio San Nicola

19 March 1995 24	Inter Milan	3–0	Foggia	Milan
	Bressan 31' (o.g.); Berti 45'; Bergkamp 73'	Report		Stadium: Stadio Giuseppe Meazza

2 April 1995 25	Reggiana	0–1	Inter Milan	Reggio Emilia
		Report	Bergomi 69'	Stadium: Stadio Mirabello

9 April 1995 26	Inter Milan	2–0	Genoa	Milan
	Delvecchio 30'; Sosa 76'	Report		Stadium: Stadio Giuseppe Meazza

15 April 1995 27	Inter Milan	3–1	Milan	Milan
	Seno 43'; Jonk 69'; S. Rossi 87' (o.g.)	Report	Stroppa 85'	Stadium: Stadio Giuseppe Meazza

23 April 1995 28	Parma	3–0	Inter Milan	Parma
	Sensini 54', 82'; Zola 74'	Report		Stadium: Stadio Ennio Tardini

30 April 1995 29	Inter Milan	0–0	Cremonese	Milan
		Report		Stadium: Stadio Giuseppe Meazza

7 May 1995 30	Napoli	1–3	Inter Milan	Naples
	André Cruz 33'	Report	Orlandini 11'; Berti 65'; Bergkamp 84'	Stadium: Stadio San Paolo

14 May 1995 31	Lazio	4–1	Inter Milan	Rome
	Signori 35' (pen.); Negro 38'; Rambaudi 72'; Winter 90'	Report	Berti 6'	Stadium: Stadio Olimpico

21 May 1995 32	Inter Milan	1–2	Cagliari	Milan
	Sosa 17'	Report	Dely Valdés 45'; M. Paganin 56' (o.g.)	Stadium: Stadio Giuseppe Meazza

28 May 1995 33	Sampdoria	2–2	Inter Milan	Genoa
	Vierchowod 25'; Bellucci 66'	Report	Festa 5'; Bianchi 86'	Stadium: Stadio Luigi Ferraris

4 June 1995 34	Inter Milan	2–1	Padova	Milan
	Orlandini 65'; Delvecchio 90'	Report	Maniero 20'	Stadium: Stadio Giuseppe Meazza

=== Coppa Italia ===
==== First round ====
22 August 1994	Lodigiani	0–3	Inter	Rome
20:30 CEST			13' (o.g.) Sala; 69' Pančev; 90' Berti	Stadium: Stadio della Borghesiana; Referee: Pellegrino

==== Second round ====
31 August 1994	Padova	0–3	Inter Milan	Padua
20:30 CEST			38' Pančev; 58' Sosa; 79' Seno	Stadium: Stadio Euganeo; Referee: Pairetto

21 September 1994	Inter Milan	0–1	Padova	Milan
20:30 CEST			42' Lalas	Stadium: Stadio Giuseppe Meazza; Referee: Lana

==== Eight-finals ====
12 October 1994	Milan	1–2	Inter Milan	Milan
20:30 CEST	Lentini 38'	Report	56' (pen.) Orlandini; 64' Bergomi	Stadium: Stadio Giuseppe Meazza; Attendance: 52,000; Referee: Collina

26 October 1994	Inter Milan	2–1	Milan	Milan
20:30 CEST	Sosa 64'; Orlandini 78'	Report	46' Donadoni	Stadium: Stadio Giuseppe Meazza; Attendance: 59,259; Referee: Pairetto

==== Quarter-finals ====
30 November 1994	Inter Milan	1–0	Foggia	Milan
20:30 CEST	Sosa 4' (pen.)			Stadium: Stadio Giuseppe Meazza; Referee: Rodomonti

13 December 1994	Foggia	2–0 (a.e.t.)	Inter Milan	Foggia
20:30 CEST	Bresciani 31'; Caini 94'			Stadium: Stadio Pino Zaccheria; Referee: Collina

=== UEFA Cup ===
==== First round ====
15 September 1994	Inter Milan (Italy)	1–0	(England) Aston Villa	Milan
20:30 (CET)	Bergkamp 76' (pen.)	Report		Stadium: Stadio Giuseppe Meazza; Attendance: 22,639; Referee: (Denmark) Mikkelsen

29 September 1994	Aston Villa (England)	1–0 (4–3 p)	(Italy) Inter Milan	Birmingham
21:00 (CET)	Houghton 42'	Report		Stadium: Villa Park; Attendance: 30,553; Referee: (France) Quiniou
	Penalties
	Parker (penalty scored); Staunton (penalty scored); Townsend (penalty scored); Whittingham (penalty missed); King (penalty scored)		(penalty scored) Bia; (penalty scored) Bergkamp; (penalty scored) Seno; (penalty missed) Fontolan; (penalty missed) Sosa

== Statistics ==
=== Players statistics ===
No.	Pos	Nat	Player	Total		Serie A		Coppa Italia		UEFA Cup	
No.	Pos	Nat	Player	Apps	Goals	Apps	Goals	Apps	Goals	Apps	Goals
	GK	(Italy) ITA	Pagliuca	43	-40	34	-34	7	-5	2	-1
	DF	(Italy) ITA	Bergomi	41	3	32	2	7	1	2	0
	DF	(Italy) ITA	Bia	31	0	20+3	0	6	0	2	0
	DF	(Italy) ITA	Festa	33	2	26	2	5	0	2	0
	DF	(Italy) ITA	Paganin	34	0	26+2	0	4	0	2	0
	MF	(Italy) ITA	Seno	32	3	24	2	6	1	2	0
	MF	(Italy) ITA	Orlando	37	0	29+1	0	6	0	1	0
	MF	(Netherlands) NED	Jonk	32	2	26+3	2	2	0	1	0
	MF	(Italy) ITA	Berti	39	6	30	5	7	1	2	0
	FW	(Netherlands) NED	Bergkamp	24	3	20+1	2	1	0	2	1
	FW	(Italy) ITA	Delvecchio	34	4	25+4	4	4	0	1	0
	GK	(Italy) ITA	Mondini	0	0	0	0	0	0	0	0
	MF	(Italy) ITA	Fontolan	22	2	17+1	2	3	0	1	0
	FW	(Uruguay) URU	Sosa	27	11	15+5	8	5	3	2	0
	MF	(Italy) ITA	Orlandini	28	6	14+9	4	5	2	0	0
	MF	(Italy) ITA	Bianchi	20	1	12+4	1	3	0	1	0
	DF	(Italy) ITA	Conte	29	0	11+9	0	7	0	2	0
	DF	(Italy) ITA	Paganin A	10	0	5+4	0	1	0	0	0
	FW	(North Macedonia) MKD	Pancev	13	4	4+3	2	5	2	1	0
	MF	(Italy) ITA	Dell'Anno	9	1	2+7	1	0	0	0	0
	MF	(Italy) ITA	Zanchetta	5	0	1+1	0	3	0	0	0
	MF	(Italy) ITA	Manicone	2	0	1	0	1	0	0	0
	FW	(Italy) ITA	Veronese	3	0	0+3	0	0	0	0	0
	MF	(Italy) ITA	Barollo	1	0	0+1	0	0	0	0	0
	MF	(Russia) RUS	Shalimov	1	0	0	0	1	0	0	0
	MF	(Italy) ITA	Nichetti	2	0	0+1	0	1	0	0	0
	DF	(Italy) ITA	Tramezzani	0	0	0	0	0	0	0	0
	MF	(Italy) ITA	Cinetti	0	0	0	0	0	0	0	0
	GK	(Italy) ITA	Fortin	0	0	0	0	0	0	0	0
	DF	(Italy) ITA	Gonnella	0	0	0	0	0	0	0	0

- Source: http://calcio-seriea.net/presenze/1994/1087/

==== Goalscorers ====
- (Uruguay) Rubén Sosa 8
- (Italy) Nicola Berti 5
- (Italy) Pierluigi Orlandini 4
- (Italy) Marco Delvecchio 4
- (Netherlands) Dennis Bergkamp 3

== Sources ==
- RSSSF - Italy 1994/95
