= 1993–94 Inter Milan season =

Inter Milan
1993–94 season
- President: Ernesto Pellegrini
- Manager: Osvaldo Bagnoli (until 7 February 1994); Giampiero Marini
- Stadium: Giuseppe Meazza
- Serie A: 13th
- Coppa Italia: Quarter-finals
- UEFA Cup: Winners (in 1994–95 UEFA Cup)
- Top goalscorer: League: Rubén Sosa (16); All: Bergkamp (18)
- Average home league attendance: 49469
Home colours	Away colours	Third colours

The 1993–94 Inter Milan season was the club's 85th in existence and 78th consecutive season in Serie A, the top flight of Italian football, in which they finished 13th. The club also competed in the 1993–94 Coppa Italia, and were eliminated in the quarter-finals, and the 1993–94 UEFA Cup, which they won after beating Austria Salzburg 2–0 in the final.

== Season ==
In the summer of 1993, Inter acquired Dutch men Dennis Bergkamp and Wim Jonk, already spotted in the previous winter. Gianluca Festa, Massimo Paganin and Francesco Dell'Anno signed for Inter, too.

Inter recorded better results in the UEFA Cup than in Serie A. Rubén Sosa was - once again - vital for the club, scoring 16 goals including a hat-trick in the win over Parma (3–2). When the league stopped for Christmas holidays, the gap from Milan was still recoverable: 20 points to 24. However, in early February, after a 1–2 loss against Lazio the club sacked Osvaldo Bagnoli replacing him with Giampiero Marini. The former midfielder managed to reach the UEFA Cup final, defeating - between March and April - Borussia Dortmund and Cagliari. Inter won the first leg, beating - with a goal from Berti - Austrian club Casino Salzburg. Inter finished the league with only 31 points, just avoiding relegation: 13th place was the worst result for Inter in modern Serie A. However, Inter was successful in Europe, winning the UEFA Cup after a 1–0 win in the second leg: Jonk was the only scorer.

=== Overview ===
Competition	Record								Result	Top Scorer
Competition	G	W	D	L	GF	GA	GD	Win %	Result	Top Scorer
Serie A	34	11	9	14	46	45	+1	32.35	13th	(Uruguay) Rubén Sosa, 16
Coppa Italia	6	2	2	2	6	5	+1	33.33	Quarter Finals	(Netherlands) Dennis Bergkamp, 2 (Italy) Davide Fontolan, 2
UEFA Cup	12	9	1	2	22	10	+12	75.00	Winners	(Netherlands) Dennis Bergkamp, 8
Total	52	22	12	18	74	60	+14	42.31		(Netherlands) Dennis Bergkamp, 18

== Squad ==
Note: Flags indicate national team as defined under FIFA eligibility rules; some limited exceptions apply. Players may hold more than one non-FIFA nationality.

Pos.	Nation	Player
GK	ITA	Walter Zenga
GK	ITA	Beniamino Abate
GK	ITA	Raffaele Nuzzo
DF	ITA	Giuseppe Bergomi
DF	ITA	Sergio Battistini
DF	ITA	Riccardo Ferri
DF	ITA	Paolo Tramezzani
DF	ITA	Gianluca Festa
DF	ITA	Massimo Paganin
DF	ITA	Antonio Paganin
MF	ITA	Francesco Dell'Anno
MF	NED	Wim Jonk

Pos.	Nation	Player
MF	ITA	Angelo Orlando
MF	ITA	Alessandro Bianchi
MF	ITA	Nicola Berti
MF	ITA	Antonio Manicone
MF	ITA	Davide Fontolan
MF	RUS	Igor Shalimov
FW	NED	Dennis Bergkamp
FW	MKD	Darko Pančev
FW	URU	Rubén Sosa
FW	ITA	Massimo Marazzina
FW	ITA	Salvatore Schillaci

=== Transfers ===
In
Pos.	Name	from	Type
FW	Dennis Bergkamp	Ajax	(£18,000 million )
MF	Francesco Dell'Anno	Udinese	(£14,000 million )
MF	Wim Jonk	Ajax	(£10,000 million )
DF	Gianluca Festa	Cagliari	(£9,000 million )
DF	Massimo Paganin	Brescia	(£6,000 million )
GK	Luca Mondini	Como	
GK	Raffaele Nuzzo	Pergocrema	loan ended
GK	Paolo Orlandoni	Leffe	loan ended
DF	Marco Grossi	Ascoli	loan ended
DF	Alessandro Rossi	Arezzo	
DF	Stefano Rossini	Udinese	loan ended
MF	Marco Barollo	Ternana	loan ended
MF	Giuseppe Marino	Taranto	loan ended
MF	Cristiano Scapolo	Ravenna	loan ended
FW	Marco Delvecchio	Venezia	loan ended

Out
Pos.	Name	To	Type
GK	Luca Mondini	Fidelis Andria	loan
GK	Paolo Orlandoni	Casarano	co-ownership
DF	Mirko Conte	Venezia	loan
DF	Stefano Bettarini	Lucchese	co-ownership renewal
DF	Luigi De Agostini	Reggiana	
DF	Marco Grossi	Maceratese	loan
DF	Stefano Ricci	Casarano	loan
DF	Pasquale Rocco	Pisa	co-ownership renewal
DF	Stefano Rossini	Udinese	loan
MF	Marco Barollo	Lecce	loan
MF	Pierluigi Di Già	Venezia	loan renewal
MF	Cristiano Scapolo	Atalanta	loan
MF	Giuseppe Marino	Modena	loan
FW	Oliver Bierhoff	Ascoli	co-ownership renewal
FW	Dario Morello	Reggiana	co-ownership renewal
FW	Marco Delvecchio	Udinese	loan

==== Winter ====
In
Pos.	Name	from	Type

Out
Pos.	Name	To	Type
DF	Gianluca Festa	Roma	loan
FW	Darko Pančev	VfB Leipzig	loan
FW	Salvatore Schillaci	Jubilo Iwata	

== Competitions ==
=== Serie A ===
==== League table ====
Pos	Team	Pld	W	D	L	GF	GA	GD	Pts	Qualification or relegation
11	Genoa	34	8	16	10	32	40	−8	32	
12	Cagliari	34	10	12	12	39	48	−9	32	
13	Internazionale (Note: Internazionale qualified to 1994–95 UEFA Cup as defending champions.)	34	11	9	14	46	45	+1	31	Qualification to UEFA Cup
14	Reggiana	34	10	11	13	29	37	−8	31	
15	Piacenza (R)	34	8	14	12	32	43	−11	30	Relegation to Serie B

Source: 1993–94 Serie A, RSSSF.com, Soccerway
Rules for classification: 1) Points; 2) Head-to-head points; 3) Head-to-head goal difference; 4) Goal difference; 5) Goals scored; 6) Draw. (Note: Head-to-head record is used only after all the matches between the teams in question have been played).
(R) Relegated

==== Results by round ====
Round	1	2	3	4	5	6	7	8	9	10	11	12	13	14	15	16	17	18	19	20	21	22	23	24	25	26	27	28	29	30	31	32	33	34
Ground	H	A	H	A	H	A	H	H	A	H	A	H	A	H	A	H	A	A	H	A	H	A	H	A	A	H	A	H	A	H	A	H	A	H
Result	W	D	W	L	D	W	D	D	W	W	L	L	D	W	W	D	L	L	W	W	D	L	L	D	L	W	L	L	L	L	W	L	D	L
Position	4	5	2	7	6	6	6	6	5	5	5	6	6	5	5	5	6	7	6	5	5	6	6	6	7	6	8	7	8	9	8	10	10	13

Source: Competitive matches
A = Away; H = Home; W = Win; D = Draw; L = Loss; = 1994–95 UEFA Champions League; = 1994–95 UEFA Cup; = Relegation to 1994–95 Serie B

==== Matches ====
29 August 1993 1	Inter	2–1	Reggiana	Milan
	Jonk 14'; Schillaci 55'	Report	Padovano 35'	Stadium: Giuseppe Meazza

5 September 1993 2	Foggia	1–1	Inter	Foggia
	Di Biagio 78' (pen.)	Report	Schillaci 45'	Stadium: Pino Zaccheria

8 September 1993 3	Inter	2–1	Cremonese	Milan
	Bergkamp 19'; Schillaci 81'	Report	Festa 53' (o.g.)	Stadium: Giuseppe Meazza

12 September 1993 4	Cagliari	1–0	Inter	Cagliari
	Dely Valdés 45'	Report		Stadium: Sant'Elia

19 September 1993 5	Lazio	0–0	Inter	Rome
		Report		Stadium: Olimpico

26 September 1993 6	Inter	2–0	Piacenza	Milan
	Bergkamp 16' (pen.); Sosa 83'	Report		Stadium: Giuseppe Meazza

3 October 1993 7	Napoli	0–0	Inter	Naples
		Report		Stadium: San Paolo

17 October 1993 8	Inter	0–0	Torino	Milan
		Report		Stadium: Giuseppe Meazza

24 October 1993 9	Udinese	0–1	Inter	Udine
		Report	Sosa 41'	Stadium: Friuli

31 October 1993 10	Inter	3–2	Parma	Milan
	Sosa 16', 37', 65'	Report	Grün 10'; Minotti 77'	Stadium: Giuseppe Meazza

7 November 1993 11	Inter	1–2	Milan	Milan
	Bergkamp 64' (pen.)	Report	Panucci 34'; Papin 52'	Stadium: Giuseppe Meazza

21 November 1993 12	Genoa	1–0	Inter	Genoa
	Ruotolo 52'	Report		Stadium: Luigi Ferraris

28 November 1993 13	Inter	2–2	Juventus	Milan
	Sosa 33', 90' (pen.)	Report	R. Baggio 55'; Möller 77'	Stadium: Giuseppe Meazza

5 December 1993 14	Lecce	1–3	Inter	Lecce
	Notaristefano 90'	Report	Bergkamp 34'; Shalimov 83', 87'	Stadium: Via del Mare

12 December 1993 15	Inter	3–0	Sampdoria	Milan
	Battistini 4'; Jugović 29' (o.g.); Bergkamp 56' (pen.)	Report		Stadium: Giuseppe Meazza

19 December 1993 16	Roma	1–1	Inter	Rome
	Balbo 15'	Report	Sosa 70'	Stadium: Olimpico

2 January 1994 17	Inter	1–2	Atalanta	Milan
	Bergkamp 82' (pen.)	Report	Magoni 17'; Orlandini 87'	Stadium: Giuseppe Meazza

9 January 1994 18	Reggiana	1–0	Inter	Reggio Emilia
	Scienza 66'	Report

16 January 1994 19	Inter	3–1	Foggia	Milan
	Sosa 19'; Jonk 33'; Bergkamp 88'	Report	Di Biagio 86'	Stadium: Giuseppe Meazza

23 January 1994 20	Cremonese	1–4	Inter	Cremona
	Gualco 51'	Report	Jonk 21', 26'; Paganin 42'; Sosa 81'	Stadium: Giovanni Zini

30 January 1994 21	Inter	3–3	Cagliari	Milan
	Sosa 44', 52'; Fontolan 90'	Report	Luís Oliveira 7'; Pusceddu 28'; Dely Valdés 84'	Stadium: Giuseppe Meazza

6 February 1994 22	Inter	1–2	Lazio	Milan
	Sosa 26'	Report	Signori 87' (pen.); Di Matteo 90'	Stadium: Giuseppe Meazza

13 February 1994 23	Piacenza	2–1	Inter	Piacenza
	Orlando 13' (o.g.); Turrini 52'	Report	Battistini 47'

20 February 1994 24	Inter	0–0	Napoli	Milan
		Report		Stadium: Giuseppe Meazza

27 February 1994 25	Torino	2–0	Inter	Turin
	Poggi 45'; Cois 56'	Report		Stadium: delle Alpi

6 March 1994 26	Inter	1–0	Udinese	Milan
	Sosa 53'	Report		Stadium: Giuseppe Meazza

13 March 1994 27	Parma	4–1	Inter	Parma
	Zola 45', 58'; Asprilla 63'; Brolin 90'	Report	Sosa 69' (pen.)	Stadium: Ennio Tardini

20 March 1994 28	Milan	2–1	Inter	Milan
	Bergomi 46' (o.g.); Massaro 89'	Report	Schillaci 86'	Stadium: San Siro

25 March 1994 29	Inter	1–3	Genoa	Milan
	Schillaci 3'	Report	Ruotolo 18', 90'; Skuhravý 26'	Stadium: Giuseppe Meazza

2 April 1994 30	Juventus	1–0	Inter	Turin
	Ferri 85' (o.g.)	Report		Stadium: delle Alpi

9 April 1994 31	Inter	4–1	Lecce	Milan
	Jonk 19', 47'; Bergkamp 50' (pen.); Berti 81'	Report	Baldieri 86'	Stadium: Giuseppe Meazza

17 April 1994 32	Sampdoria	3–1	Inter	Genoa
	Vierchowod 21'; Evani 70'; Amoruso 90'	Report	Battistini 25'	Stadium: Luigi Ferraris

24 April 1994 33	Inter	2–2	Roma	Milan
	Fontolan 22'; Berti 70'	Report	Giannini 14'; Cappioli 80'	Stadium: Giuseppe Meazza

29 April 1994 34	Atalanta	2–1	Inter	Bergamo
	Orlandini 45'; Sgrò 83'	Report	Sosa 45'	Stadium: Comunale

=== Coppa Italia ===
Round of 32

27 October 1993	Inter	2–0	Lucchese	Milan
20:30 CEST	Battistini 52'; Bergkamp 58' (pen.)			Stadium: Stadio Giuseppe Meazza; Attendance: 3 524; Referee: Arena

10 November 1993	Lucchese	2–1	Inter	Lucca
20:30 CET	Rastelli 17'; Albino 19'		79' Shalimov	Stadium: Stadio Porta Elisa; Referee: Trentalange

Eight-finals

1 December 1993	Udinese	0–0	Inter	Udine
20:30 CET				Stadium: Stadio Friuli; Referee: Nicchi

15 December 1993	Inter	2–1	Udinese	Milan
20:30 CET	Fontolan 7'; Bergkamp 74' (pen.)		40' Gelsi	Stadium: Stadio Giuseppe Meazza; Attendance: 4.343; Referee: Rosica

Quarter-finals

6 January 1994	Sampdoria	1–0	Inter	Genoa
20:30 CET	Lombardo 33'			Stadium: Stadio Marassi; Attendance: 18.000; Referee: Pairetto

27 January 1994	Inter	1–1	Sampdoria	Milan
20:30 CET	Fontolan 70'		89' Gullit	Stadium: Stadio Giuseppe Meazza; Attendance: 12.017; Referee: Collina

=== UEFA Cup ===
Round of 32

15 September 1993	Inter (Italy)	3–1	(Romania) Rapid Bucharest	Milan
20:30 (CET)	Bergkamp 19' (pen.), 66', 79'	Report	52' Andraşi	Stadium: Stadio Giuseppe Meazza; Attendance: 21.983; Referee: (Germany) Assenmacher

29 September 1993	Rapid Bucharest (Romania)	0–2	(Italy) Inter	Bucharest
18:00 (CET)		Report	75' Battistini; 83' Jonk	Stadium: Stadio Giulești; Referee: (Netherlands) Uilenberg

Round of 16

20 October 1993	Inter (Italy)	1–0	(Cyprus) Apollon Limassol	Milan
20:30 (CET)	Bergkamp 8'	Report		Stadium: Stadio Giuseppe Meazza; Attendance: 15.000; Referee: (Luxembourg) Philippi

3 November 1993	Apollon Limassol (Cyprus)	3–3	(Italy) Inter	Limassol
17:00 (CET)	Spoljaric 11'; Šćepović 30'; Iosifidis 85'	Report	5' Shalimov; 8' Bergkamp; 38' Fontolan	Stadium: Stadio Tsirion; Attendance: 20.000; Referee: (Bulgaria) Ouzounov

Eight-finals

24 November 1993	Norwich City (England)	0–1	(Italy) Inter	Norwich
20:10 (CET)		Report	80' (pen.) Bergkamp	Stadium: Carrow Road; Attendance: 21.000; Referee: (Switzerland) Muhmenthaler

8 December 1993	Inter (Italy)	1–0	(England) Norwich City	Milan
15:00 (CET)	Bergkamp 89'	Report		Stadium: Stadio Giuseppe Meazza; Attendance: 30.000; Referee: (Czech Republic) Krondl

Quarter-finals

1 March 1994	Borussia Dortmund (Germany)	1–3	(Italy) Inter	Dortmund
19:30 (CET)	Schulz 83'	Report	33', 36' Jonk; 90' Shalimov	Stadium: Westfalenstadion; Attendance: 40.000; Referee: (Netherlands) van der Ende

17 March 1994	Inter (Italy)	1–2	(Germany) Borussia Dortmund	Milan
20:35 (CET)	Manicone 81'	Report	39' Zorc; 47' Ricken	Stadium: Stadio Giuseppe Meazza; Attendance: 28.985; Referee: (Belgium) Piraux

==== Semi-finals ====
30 March 1994	Cagliari (Italy)	3–2	(Italy) Inter	Cagliari
18:30 (CET)	Oliveira 11'; Criniti 81'; Pancaro 86'	Report	6' Fontolan; 61' Sosa	Stadium: Stadio Sant'Elia; Attendance: 32 543; Referee: (Spain) López Nieto

12 April 1994	Inter (Italy)	3–0	(Italy) Cagliari	Milan
20:30 (CET)	Bergkamp 37' (pen.); Berti 54'; Jonk 63'	Report		Stadium: Stadio Giuseppe Meazza; Attendance: 58 648; Referee: (England) Don

==== Final ====
26 April 1994	Casino Salzburg (Austria)	0–1	(Italy) Inter	Wien
20:30 (CET)		Report	35' Berti	Stadium: Ernst Happel Stadion; Attendance: 55.000; Referee: (Denmark) Nielsen

11 May 1994	Inter (Italy)	1–0	(Austria) Casino Salzburg	Milan
20:30 (CET)	Jonk 62'	Report		Stadium: Stadio Giuseppe Meazza; Attendance: 80.326; Referee: (Scotland) Mccluskey

=== Appearances and goals ===
Statistics are referred to domestic league.

== Statistics ==
=== Players statistics ===
No.	Pos	Nat	Player	Total		Serie A		Coppa		UEFA	
No.	Pos	Nat	Player	Apps	Goals	Apps	Goals	Apps	Goals	Apps	Goals
	GK	(Italy) ITA	Zenga	49	-58	32	−43	5	−5	12	−10
	DF	(Italy) ITA	Bergomi	47	0	30+1	0	4	0	12	0
	DF	(Italy) ITA	Battistini	46	5	29+1	3	6	1	10	1
	DF	(Italy) ITA	Paganin	43	1	30	1	5	0	8	0
	DF	(Italy) ITA	Fontolan	43	6	30	2	4	2	9	2
	MF	(Russia) RUS	Shalimov	29	5	17+1	2	5	1	6	2
	MF	(Italy) ITA	Orlando	47	0	26+4	0	6	0	11	0
	MF	(Italy) ITA	Manicone	45	1	30+1	0	5	0	9	1
	MF	(Netherlands) NED	Jonk	35	11	25	6	1	0	9	5
	FW	(Netherlands) NED	Bergkamp	48	18	30+1	8	6	2	11	8
	FW	(Uruguay) URU	Sosa	44	17	27+1	16	6	0	10	1
	GK	(Italy) ITA	Abate	4	-2	2	-2	2	-0	0	-0
	DF	(Italy) ITA	Ferri	28	0	15+1	0	5	0	7	0
	DF	(Italy) ITA	Tramezzani	19	0	12+1	0	3	0	3	0
	DF	(Italy) ITA	Paganin M	29	0	10+6	0	4	0	9	0
	MF	(Italy) ITA	Dell'Anno	25	0	8+7	0	3	0	7	0
	MF	(Italy) ITA	Berti	13	4	6+3	2	0	0	4	2
	FW	(Italy) ITA	Schillacci	13	5	6+3	5	1	0	3	0
	MF	(Italy) ITA	Bianchi	18	0	5+5	0	3	0	5	0
	DF	(Italy) ITA	Festa	5	0	3+1	0	0	0	1	0
	FW	(Italy) ITA	Marazzina	3	0	2+1	0	0	0	0	0
		(Italy) ITA	A. Rossi	3	0	1	0	1	0	1	0
		(Italy) ITA	F. Di Sauro	1	0	0+1	0	0	0	0	0
	FW	(North Macedonia) MKD	Pancev	0	0	0	0	0	0	0	0

- Source: http://calcio-seriea.net/presenze/1993/1056/

== Sources ==
- RSSSF - Italy 1993/94
