= Darko Pančev =

Macedonian footballer (born 1965)

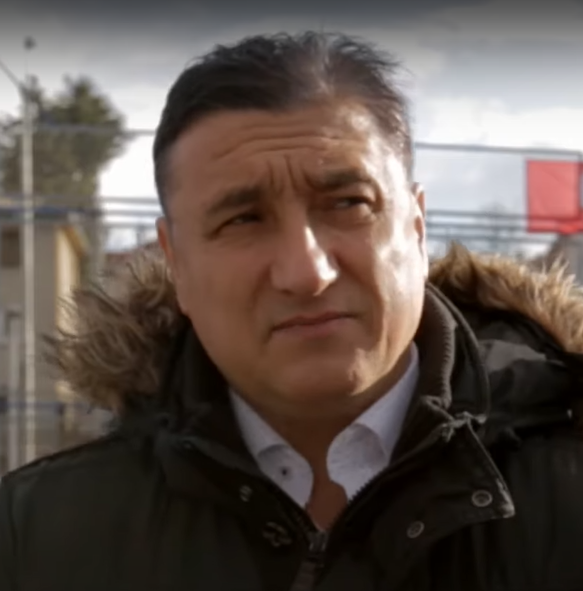
- Pančev in 2020

Personal information
- Date of birth: 7 September 1965 (age 61)
- Place of birth: Skopje, SR Macedonia, SFR Yugoslavia
- Height: 1.80 m (5 ft 11 in)
- Position: Forward

Youth career
- –1983: Vardar

Senior career*
| Years | Team | Apps | (Gls) |
| 1983–1988 | Vardar | 151 | (84) |
| 1988–1992 | Red Star Belgrade | 92 | (84) |
| 1992–1995 | Inter Milan | 19 | (3) |
| 1994 | → VfB Leipzig (loan) | 10 | (2) |
| 1995–1996 | Fortuna Düsseldorf | 14 | (2) |
| 1996 | Sion | 5 | (0) |
| Total | | 291 | (175) |

International career
| 1984–1991 | Yugoslavia | 27 | (17) |
| 1991–1995 | Macedonia | 9 | (1) |
- * Club domestic league appearances and goals

Darko Pančev (Macedonian: Дарко Панчев, Macedonian pronunciation: [ˈdarkɔ ˈpantʃɛf]; born 7 September 1965) is a Macedonian former professional footballer who played as a forward. He most notably played for FK Vardar and Red Star Belgrade.

He was part of the Red Star Belgrade squad that won the European Cup in 1990–91, and was awarded the European Golden Boot in 1991.

== Club career ==
=== Vardar ===
His playing career started in 1983 at Vardar where he quickly developed into one of the most feared strikers in the Yugoslav League, becoming league top scorer in the 1983–84 season. The skill and seeming ease of his goal scoring exploits in Skopje made him a target for bigger clubs.

=== Red Star Belgrade ===
During summer 1988, Pančev was snapped up by Red Star Belgrade, which beat cross-town rivals FK Partizan to the twenty-two-year-old's signature. Another talented youngster, 21-year-old Dejan Savićević, also arrived to the club during the same transfer window, but both promptly got sent to serve the mandatory Yugoslav People's Army (JNA) stint that kept them off the pitch for the entire league season.

Pančev debuted for his new club in 1989 and played three full seasons for crveno-beli, scoring an incredible 84 goals from 91 league appearances, and winning the European Cup and the Intercontinental Cup in 1991.

Due to his phenomenal strike rate, during the early 1990s, he was widely recognized as one of the best strikers in the world. Displaying great goalscoring instincts and predatory skills, he got nicknamed Kobra by the Serbian sports media. Red Star fans remember him as the player who scored the winning penalty in the 1991 European Cup final, bringing Red Star the most prestigious trophy in European football for the first time in its 50-year existence.

Pančev was the highest scorer in top-division European football in the 1990–91 season with 34 goals, and should have won the European Golden Boot award. However, UEFA decided to make the competition unofficial for the season because of suspect scoring sprees in Cyprus. Pančev did not get the prize at the time, but received it fifteen years later on 3 August 2006 in Skopje. The Golden Boot was presented at a special gala by Michel Platini, Dragan Stojković and Dragan Džajić.

On 4 March 1992, Pančev scored two goals for Red Star to defeat Panathinaikos 2–0 at the Olympic Stadium in Athens in a European Cup match. The spotlight was on him because upon completing the forms to gain entry in Greece, he wrote his nationality as Macedonian. This made great havoc among the Greeks, he was detained several hours before being allowed to cross the border. In an interview after the duel he would say, "There is a saying that luck follows the brave. I was happy to score two goals before 80,000 spectators in Athens and Red Star to win 2–0. After that, the earth could open up and I did not mind."

=== Inter Milan ===
Over the summer 1992 off-season, soon to be twenty-seven-year-old Pančev signed for Internazionale in a high-profile transfer with the ITL14 billion (£7 million) fee paid to Red Star. Inter thus beat out Real Madrid, FC Barcelona, and AC Milan, each of whom had approached the player over the preceding six months. Arriving at a club that had finished the previous league season in disappointing eighth place (which precipitated a major squad overhaul with the famous German triumvirate of Lothar Matthäus, Jürgen Klinsmann, and Andreas Brehme leaving San Siro and head coach Luis Suárez getting fired), Pančev was naturally looked to for goals as suggested by his glowing reputation from the Yugoslav First League and Red Star's European campaigns. Upon signing, the club owner and president Ernesto Pellegrini even compared him to Paolo Rossi, giving an indication of the level of expectation thrust upon the Macedonian.

==== 1992–93 season ====
Joining a squad that in addition to new head coach Osvaldo Bagnoli also featured plenty of new faces in the player personnel, the conventional wisdom was that such circumstances would work in Pančev's favour in terms of fitting in. His competitors for spots upfront were all new arrivals as well: Uruguayan Rubén Sosa who came from Lazio, the Italian 1990 World Cup hero Salvatore Schillaci joining from Juventus, and, depending on formation, even Russian attacking midfielder Igor Shalimov who was acquired from Foggia.

However, in contrast to club president Pellegrini, head coach Bagnoli wasn't as taken with Pančev's playing style and already during pre-season reproached the player for lack of movement. The highly-touted forward made his Inter debut during late August 1992 in Coppa Italia away at Reggiana, scoring a hat-trick in a 4–3 Inter win. A week later, he added two more goals in the return leg at home, leading the nerazzurri to a 4–2 win.

The league season started several days later away at Udinese with Pančev getting a start alongside Schillaci before getting subbed off in the 81st minute for Davide Fontolan with the score tied at 1–1; by the end, Udinese managed to score once more for a 2–1 win. The following week, at home versus Cagliari, he got the start again next to Schillaci before again being subbed off for Fontolan, this time in the 79th minute with Inter leading 2–1. For the week 3 fixture away at Napoli, Pančev found himself out of the matchday squad and the same scenario repeated for the subsequent five league matches as head coach Bagnoli completely removed him from consideration for matchday squads, thereby handing Rubén Sosa the other forward spot, alongside automatic choice Schillaci.

After almost two months without competitive football, Pančev got reinstated courtesy of an injury suffered by Bagnoli's preferred centre forward Schillaci, with the head coach giving the Macedonian a full ninety minute performance in a 0–0 home draw versus Sampdoria. The following league match was the Derby della Madonnina—against bitter city rivals, San Siro co-tenants, and defending league champions AC Milan—which Pančev began on the bench before being brought on unexpectedly in the 37th minute due to Sosa's injury; the contests ended 1–1 with Pančev still scoreless in the league. With Schillaci and Sosa both out injured, Pančev started the following league fixture versus Brescia in late November 1992 alongside Fontolan; Inter won 2–1, but the player again failed to score. The following two matches, losses to Ancona and Lazio, Pančev played alongside Fontolan as Schillaci and Sosa were still recovering. The return of Sosa in early January 1993, relegated Pančev to the bench while Inter finally showed some improved form with four straight league wins.

It was apparent the Macedonian was experiencing major problems adapting to stringent Italian league defences and his goal output suddenly became nonexistent. Simultaneously, his relationship with Bagnoli took a turn for the worse, as the two started butting heads, often publicly. Pančev apparently even resorted to faking an illness in order to avoid sitting on the bench. The Italian press got down on the striker too, derisively modifying his Red Star moniker Il Cobra to Il Ramarro (green lizard). In December 1992, Pančev had an offer from Alex Ferguson's Manchester United but opted to remain at San Siro and continue fighting for a spot at Inter.

He'd wait until late January 1993 to net his first league goal, which came at home versus Udinese. Parallel to Pančev's struggles, Inter posted a decent league season behind Sosa's goalscoring exploits, and with no distraction of European football finished league runners-up to cross-town rival AC Milan. Overall, during his debut season, Pančev appeared in just twelve league matches for the Nerazzurri, scoring one league goal in addition to five goals in four Coppa Italia appearances (second best striker of the latter competition).

==== 1993–94 season ====
Pančev remained part of the Inter squad for the 1993–94 season, although he was completely out of the first-team picture as his relationship with Bagnoli deteriorated to a point of no repair. Furthermore, the arrival of £12 million signing Dennis Bergkamp from Ajax relegated the Macedonian even further down the pecking order. He did not get any league appearances during the first half of the season nor did he get any action in the UEFA Cup.

In January 1994, during the league winter break, Pančev got loaned out to German team VfB Leipzig.

==== Loan to Leipzig ====
Arriving to a club fighting for its life near the bottom of the table, Pančev scored two goals in ten matches for Leipzig during Bundesliga spring half-season. The team still got relegated.

==== Return to Inter ====
Pančev returned to San Siro following a six-month loan hoping to make the most of his second chance. Playing under new head coach Ottavio Bianchi, the 29-year-old looked on track to do just that early into the season, scoring in a 3–1 home win versus Fiorentina and two weeks later in a 2–1 home loss to Bari. However, subsequent loss of form and injuries meant that he made the total of only seven league appearances during the campaign. He also scored twice in Coppa Italia. In the UEFA Cup, he got a surprise starting appearance in late September in the return leg of the second round tie versus Aston Villa and even had a glorious opportunity to score following Nicola Berti's thundering shot that bounced favourably off the crossbar, but ended up blasting the rebound high over the bar. UEFA Cup title-holders Inter ended up getting eliminated on penalties that night. It was Pančev's first and only European match while at Inter. Throughout the season, the entire club was going through major turmoil behind the scenes and eventually, the owner and club president Pellegrini sold the team to oil magnate Massimo Moratti in March 1995. At the end of the season, during the summer 1995 transfer window, Pančev got offloaded to Fortuna Düsseldorf.

Due to his less than stellar displays in Serie A, Pančev has often been referred to as bidone by Inter fans, a derisive term in Italian meaning "trashcan", used colloquially for high-profile flops in the league.

=== Late career ===
He ended his playing career with Swiss team Sion in 1997.

After retiring from playing, Pančev often talked at length about his failed stint at Inter Milan. In 2002, he addressed the criticism he often received in Italy about his lack of movement off the ball:

There are strikers who don’t run and there are strikers who run. I was one of those strikers with a natural talent for scoring, and I ran only when I was within 30 metres of goal. Unfortunately Inter didn’t want to accept that style of play.

He also complained about supposed less-than-friendly attitudes in the Nerazzurri dressing room towards certain foreigners, and in this regard singled out Inter's Italian stalwarts Walter Zenga, Giuseppe Bergomi, and Riccardo Ferri as main perpetrators:

Yes, they were my problem! They forced Bagnoli, who was a weak coach, to play Salvatore Schillaci instead of me. Recently, I ran into Zenga, who is now coach of National Bucharest, and said, ‘I hope you're a better coach than Bagnoli was at Inter.’ I said it to remind him of that time. Signing for Inter was my greatest football mistake. In 1992, I was the top striker in Europe. I could have gone anywhere I wanted: Real, Barcelona, Manchester United. My career would have been much richer, in football terms and financially, if I had. And I was only one of the players whose career Inter ruined: think of Wim Jonk, Matthias Sammer, Igor Shalimov. Dennis Bergkamp left after two years, and he needed a year in England to find himself again.

== International career ==
Pančev played in the 1990 World Cup for Yugoslavia and scored two goals in their 4–1 win over the United Arab Emirates in the group stage. It proved to be the only international tournament he played in; he was later called to UEFA Euro 1992, but he then renounced a place in the squad on 23 May, claiming physical reasons, although this statement was believable for just a few people in Belgrade, who saw political views as the true cause of the withdrawal of the Macedonian forward - who had been the top marksman on qualifying group stages, with ten goals. He was replaced on the same day by Dragan Jakovljević, but in 31 May the national team was banned due to the Yugoslav Wars, just ten days before the tournament opening.

Pančev later played in the Macedonian national team's first ever official match, on 13 October 1993, against Slovenia. His final international was a June 1995 European Championship qualification match against Belgium.

In November 2003, to celebrate UEFA's jubilee, he was selected as the Golden Player of Macedonia by the Football Federation of the Republic of Macedonia as their most outstanding player of the past 50 years.

== Post-playing career ==
After retiring from playing football, Pančev worked with the Football Federation of Macedonia. In July 2006, Pančev was named the sporting director of Vardar.

== Personal life ==
Pančev is married to singer Maja Grozdanovska-Pančeva. They have two daughters. He owns a cafe called Devetka (Number Nine) in Skopje.

== Career statistics ==
=== Club ===
Appearances and goals by club, season and competition
| Club | Season | League | | | Cup | | Continental | | Other | | Total | |
| Club | Season | Division | Apps | Goals | Apps | Goals | Apps | Goals | Apps | Goals | Apps | Goals |
|---|---|---|---|---|---|---|---|---|---|---|---|---|
| Vardar | 1982–83 | Yugoslav First League | 4 | 3 | | | — | | — | | 4 | 3 |
| Vardar | 1983–84 | Yugoslav First League | 31 | 19 | | | — | | — | | 31 | 19 |
| Vardar | 1984–85 | Yugoslav First League | 31 | 20 | | | — | | — | | 31 | 20 |
| Vardar | 1985–86 | Yugoslav First League | 26 | 12 | | | 3 | 2 | — | | 29 | 14 |
| Vardar | 1986–87 | Yugoslav First League | 29 | 17 | | | — | | — | | 29 | 17 |
| Vardar | 1987–88 | Yugoslav First League | 30 | 13 | | | 2 | 0 | — | | 32 | 13 |
| Vardar | Total | | 151 | 84 | | | 5 | 2 | — | | 156 | 86 |
| Red Star Belgrade | 1988–89 | Yugoslav First League | — | | | | | | | | | |
| Red Star Belgrade | 1989–90 | Yugoslav First League | 32 | 25 | 8 | 8 | 5 | 2 | — | | 45 | 35 |
| Red Star Belgrade | 1990–91 | Yugoslav First League | 32 | 34 | 7 | 6 | 9 | 5 | — | | 48 | 45 |
| Red Star Belgrade | 1991–92 | Yugoslav First League | 28 | 25 | 9 | 4 | 9 | 6 | 2 (Note: One appearance in UEFA Super Cup, one appearance and one goal in Intercontinental Cup) | 1 | 48 | 36 |
| Red Star Belgrade | Total | | 92 | 84 | 24 | 18 | 23 | 13 | 2 | 1 | 141 | 116 |
| Inter Milan | 1992–93 | Serie A | 12 | 1 | 4 | 5 | — | | — | | 16 | 6 |
| Inter Milan | 1993–94 | Serie A | 0 | 0 | 0 | 0 | 0 | 0 | — | | 0 | 0 |
| Inter Milan | 1994–95 | Serie A | 7 | 2 | 5 | 2 | 1 | 0 | — | | 13 | 4 |
| Inter Milan | Total | | 19 | 3 | 9 | 7 | 1 | 0 | — | | 29 | 10 |
| VfB Leipzig (loan) | 1993–94 | Bundesliga | 10 | 2 | 0 | 0 | — | | — | | 10 | 2 |
| Fortuna Düsseldorf | 1995–96 | Bundesliga | 14 | 2 | 3 | 1 | — | | — | | 17 | 3 |
| Sion | 1996–97 | Nationalliga A | 5 | 0 | | | 1 | 1 | — | | 6 | 1 |
| Total | | | 291 | 175 | 36 | 26 | 30 | 16 | 2 | 1 | 359 | 218 |

=== International ===
Yugoslavia

List of international goals scored by Darko Pančev
| No. | Date | Venue | Opponent | Score | Result | Competition |
|---|---|---|---|---|---|---|
| 1 | 25 March 1987 | Banja Luka, Yugoslavia | Austria | 1–0 | 4–0 | Friendly |
| 2 | 25 March 1987 | Banja Luka, Yugoslavia | Austria | 4–0 | 4–0 | Friendly |
| 3 | 23 August 1989 | Kuopio, Finland | Finland | 1–1 | 2–2 | Friendly |
| 4 | 20 September 1989 | Novi Sad, Yugoslavia | Greece | 3–0 | 3–0 | Friendly |
| 5 | 28 October 1989 | Marousi, Greece | Cyprus | 2–1 | 2–1 | Friendly |
| 6 | 19 June 1990 | Bologna, Italy | United Arab Emirates | 2–0 | 4–1 | 1990 FIFA World Cup |
| 7 | 19 June 1990 | Bologna, Italy | United Arab Emirates | 3–1 | 4–1 | 1990 FIFA World Cup |
| 8 | 12 September 1990 | Belfast, Northern Ireland | Northern Ireland | 1–0 | 2–0 | UEFA Euro 1992 qualifying |
| 9 | 31 October 1990 | Belgrade, Yugoslavia | Austria | 1–1 | 4–1 | UEFA Euro 1992 qualifying |
| 10 | 31 October 1990 | Belgrade, Yugoslavia | Austria | 3–1 | 4–1 | UEFA Euro 1992 qualifying |
| 11 | 31 October 1990 | Belgrade, Yugoslavia | Austria | 4–1 | 4–1 | UEFA Euro 1992 qualifying |
| 12 | 27 March 1991 | Belgrade, Yugoslavia | Northern Ireland | 2–1 | 4–1 | UEFA Euro 1992 qualifying |
| 13 | 27 March 1991 | Belgrade, Yugoslavia | Northern Ireland | 3–1 | 4–1 | UEFA Euro 1992 qualifying |
| 14 | 27 March 1991 | Belgrade, Yugoslavia | Northern Ireland | 4–1 | 4–1 | UEFA Euro 1992 qualifying |
| 15 | 1 May 1991 | Belgrade, Yugoslavia | Denmark | 1–1 | 1–2 | UEFA Euro 1992 qualifying |
| 16 | 16 May 1991 | Belgrade, Yugoslavia | Faroe Islands | 3–0 | 7–0 | UEFA Euro 1992 qualifying |
| 17 | 16 May 1991 | Belgrade, Yugoslavia | Faroe Islands | 6–0 | 7–0 | UEFA Euro 1992 qualifying |

Macedonia

List of international goals scored by Darko Pančev
| No. | Date | Venue | Opponent | Score | Result | Competition |
|---|---|---|---|---|---|---|
| 1 | 13 October 1993 | Kranj, Slovenia | Slovenia | 2–1 | 4–1 | Friendly |

== Honours ==
Red Star Belgrade

- Yugoslav First League: 1989–90, 1990–91, 1991–92
- Yugoslav Cup: 1989–90
- European Cup: 1990–91
- Intercontinental Cup: 1991

Individual

- European Golden Shoe: 1990–91
- Ballon d'Or runner-up: 1991
- Yugoslav First League top scorer: 1984, 1990, 1991, 1992
- ADN Eastern European Footballer of the Season: 1991
- UEFA Jubilee Awards – Greatest Macedonian Footballer of the last 50 Years (Golden Player): 2003

Sporting positions
| Preceded by First captain | Macedonia captain 1993–1995 | Succeeded by Toni Micevski |
