= Carlo De Medici =

Italian sporting executive

Chairman of Inter Milan
- In office 1910–1912
- Preceded by: Ettore Strauss
- Succeeded by: Emilio Hirzel

Personal details
- Known for: Third chairman of Inter Milan

Carlo De Medici was the third chairman of Inter Milan from 1910 to 1912.

During his chairmanship, Inter won their first Italian championship (1909–10), two years after their foundation.

== See also ==
- List of Inter Milan chairmen
