= Ettore Strauss =

Italian sporting director

Chairman of Inter Milan
- In office 1909–1910
- Preceded by: Giovanni Paramithiotti
- Succeeded by: Carlo De Medici

Personal details
- Known for: Second chairman of Inter Milan

Ettore Strauss was the second chairman of Inter Milan.

== Career ==
Following the wishes of the Swiss majority of the club's members, he replaced Giovanni Paramithiotti on the eve of Inter's first official match.

Officially, the change at the top of the club took place after the derby with Milan in October 1908, played in Chiasso. He remained in office until the eve of the 1909–10 season when he gave way to Carlo De Medici.
