= Sarroch =

Sarroch Sarrocu (Sardinian)
- Comune
- Comune di Sarroch
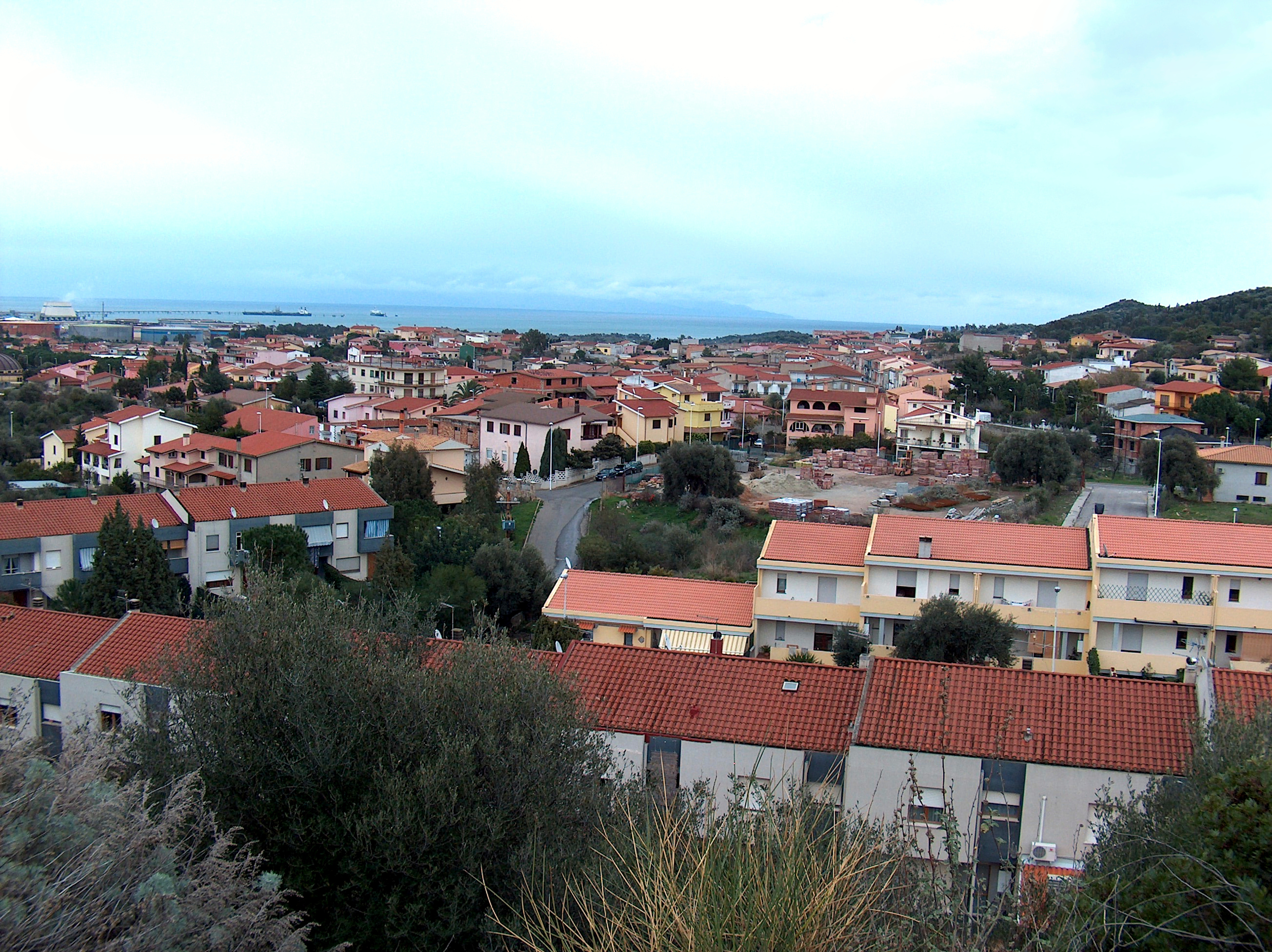

- Location within Sardinia
- Coordinates: 39°4′N 9°1′E
- Country: Italy
- Region: Sardinia
- Metropolitan city: Cagliari (CA)

Government
  - Mayor: Angelo Dessì (from October 2021)

Area
  - Total: 67.83 km^{2} (26.19 sq mi)
- Elevation: 47 m (154 ft)

Population (2025)
  - Total: 4,970
  - Density: 73.3/km^{2} (190/sq mi)
- Demonym: Sarrochesi
- Time zone: UTC+1 (CET)
  - Summer (DST): UTC+2 (CEST)
- Postal code: 09018
- Dialing code: 070
- Website: Official website

Sarroch (Sardinian: Sarrocu) is a comune (municipality) in the Metropolitan City of Cagliari in the Italian region of Sardinia, located about 20 kilometres (12 mi) southwest of Cagliari. It has 4,970 inhabitants.

Sarroch borders the following municipalities: Assemini, Capoterra, Pula, Villa San Pietro.

Sarroch population grows to about 10,000 in the summer due to the tourist flow in the zones of Perda e Sali and Portu Columbu.

== Etymology ==
The origins of the name are unknown. It might derive from the Phoenician "Sharak" meaning "bunch of grapes", or perhaps from the Catalan "S'arroch", with reference of the majestic rock that dominates the village.

== Demographics ==
Historical population

Year	Pop.	±%
1861	1,198	—
1871	1,150	−4.0%
1881	1,142	−0.7%
1901	1,350	+18.2%
1911	1,646	+21.9%
1921	1,680	+2.1%
1931	1,742	+3.7%
1936	1,807	+3.7%

Year	Pop.	±%
1951	2,261	+25.1%
1961	2,710	+19.9%
1971	3,944	+45.5%
1981	4,968	+26.0%
1991	5,379	+8.3%
2001	5,243	−2.5%
2011	5,198	−0.9%
2021	5,057	−2.7%

Source: ISTAT

== Economy ==
Sarroch is the location of the oil refinery Saras S.p.A. owned by the Moratti family.

The refinery is one of the biggest in Europe and was the subject of scandals related to pollution and public incentives for renewable energy sources and also worker security. In 2009 the documentary Oil, based on the story of the refinery, was subject to censorship in Italy.
