= Saras S.p.A. =

Italian energy multinational corporation

- Type: Public
- Traded as: BIT: SRS
- Industry: Energy
- Founded: 1962; 64 years ago
- Founder: Angelo Moratti
- Headquarters: Milan, Italy
- Key people: Massimo Moratti (chairman); Dario Scaffardi (CEO and GM)
- Products: Oil and Natural Gas; Wind energy
- Revenue: ▲€10.397 billion (2018)
- Operating income: ▼€145 million (2018)
- Net income: ▼€140 million (2018)
- Total assets: ▼€2.960 billion (2018)
- Total equity: ▲€1.104 billion (2018)
- Number of employees: 1,946
- Website: www.saras.it

Saras S.p.A. is an Italian energy multinational corporation with operations in petroleum refining, marketing, transportation and power generation, headquartered in Milan and plants and registered office in Sarroch. Its main production plants are located in Sarroch, on the island of Sardinia, Italy. The company is listed on the Borsa Italiana (Code ISIN: IT0000433307, Code: SRS, Segment: MTA).

== History ==
The company was founded in 1962 by Angelo Moratti. In 1965, giant Sarroch refinery begun operations. In the mid 1990s, Saras begun to operate in the oil wholesale market with its subsidiaries in Spain (Saras Energia) and Italy (Arcola Petrolifera). In the early 2000s, the company entered the power generation business, producing electricity from natural gas and, later, from wind farms.

== Operations ==
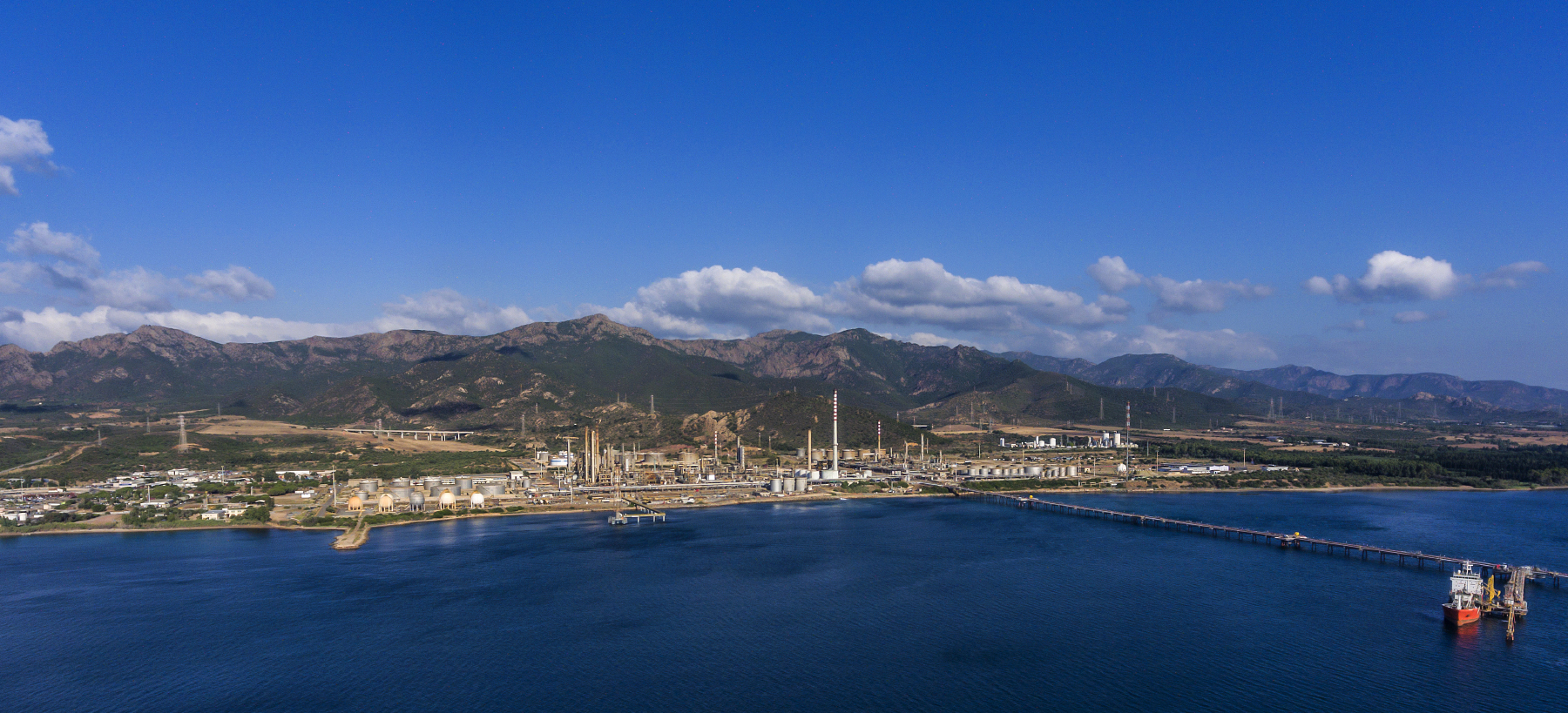
View of Saras refinery in Sarroch, Sardinia, Italy.

The Sarroch refinery has the highest production capacity of any Mediterranean refinery and a refining capacity of about 15 million tons per year, the equivalent of 15% of the total capacity of Italian refineries. The group sells and distributes oil products directly, and through its subsidiaries, such as diesel, gasoline, diesel fuel for heating, liquefied petroleum gas (LPG), virgin naphtha and aviation fuel, mainly on the Italian and Spanish markets. In 2018 approximately 2.12 million tonnes of petroleum products were sold in Italy on the wholesale market, and a further 1.56 million tonnes were sold on the Spanish market through its subsidiary Saras Energia SAU.

From the early 2000s, the Saras Group operates an IGCC plant (Integrated Gasification Combined Cycle), which has an installed power of 575 MW (managed by the subsidiary Sarlux Srl). The feedstock used by the IGCC plant is the heavy products of the refinery, and the plant generates over 4 billion kWh of electricity per year, which corresponds to more than 45% of Sardinia's electricity requirement. In addition, since 2005 Saras operates a large wind farm in Ulassai, Sardinia (managed by the subsidiary Sardeolica Srl), with an installed capacity of 96 MW.

== Controversies and investigations ==
In January 2007, Milan prosecutors launched an investigation on the listing of Saras for inflated prices. On 12 May 2011, the case was officially dismissed. In January 2009, a documentary-film on the Sarroch refinery by Massimiliano Mazzotta was released; the film investigates on the death of a worker on the job and the alleged widespread pollution caused by the refinery. The Moratti family tried without success to block the distribution of the film by presenting a lawsuit.

In May 2009, three workers died on the job at Sarroch refinery. On 7 March 2014, the Court of Appeals of Cagliari convicted Dario Scaffardi, manager of Saras, and Guido Grosso, ex manager, with a suspended sentence of 20 months (versus the previous sentence of 24 months), in addition to granting an award of damages to the plaintiffs; however, the company was judged non-liable.

== Major shareholders ==
As of 4 July 2019

1. Massimo Moratti S.a.p.A. (20.011%)
2. Angel Capital Management S.p.A. (10.005%)
3. Stella Holding S.p.A. (10.005%)
4. Saras S.p.A. (0.970%)
5. Others (59.009%)

== Subsidiaries ==
As of 31 December 2015

- Sarlux S.r.l. (100%)
- Saras Trading S.A. (100%)
- Deposito di Arcola S.r.l. (100%)
- Sarint S.A. (100%)

- Sartec S.p.A. (100%)
- Sargas S.r.l. (100%)
- Reasar S.A. (100%)
- Saras Energia SAU (100%)

- Terminal Logistica de Cartagena SLU (100%)
- Parchi Eolici Ulassai S.r.l. (100%)
- Alpha Eolica S.r.l. (100%)
- Sardeolica S.r.l. (100%)

== See also ==
- Oil, documentary film directed by Massimiliano Mazzotta, it explores the impact of oil development (implemented by the factory of Saras SpA) on the earth and the life of the local population
