= Giovanni Paramithiotti =

Italian sporting director

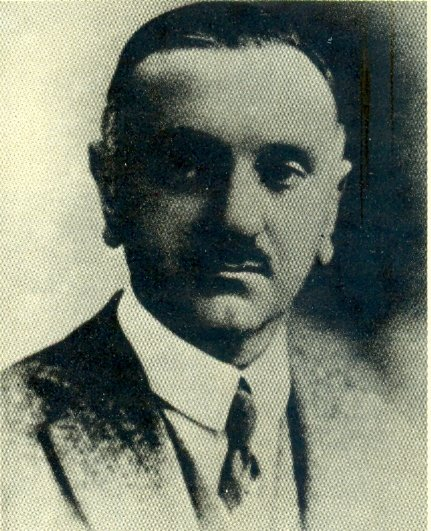

Chairman of Inter Milan
- In office 1908–1909
- Preceded by: Office established
- Succeeded by: Ettore Strauss

Personal details
- Born: Venice, Italy
- Died: 11 March 1943 New York City, United States
- Occupation: Chairman of Inter Milan
- Known for: One of the founders and first chairman of Inter Milan

Giovanni Paramithiotti (Venice, ... – New York City, 11 March 1943) was an Italian industrialist and sporting director. He was one of the founders and the first chairman of the football club Inter Milan (1908–1909).

== Biography ==
Paramithiotti was born in Venice into a wealthy family. The ethnic origins of his family are not definitively established and remain disputed. Some sources, primarily Albanian media and websites, claim that the family had Cham Albanian roots from the area of Paramythia in the Epirus region of Greece (then part of the Ottoman Empire). According to this narrative, his ancestors emigrated to Venice in the 18th century as part of the Albanian diaspora. Other sources, including several Italian books on Inter Milan history, suggest a Jewish Venetian origin. Both theories are based on secondary sources and lack strong primary evidence, such as Venetian archival records.

He was one of the 44 founding members of Football Club Internazionale Milano on 9 March 1908, following the split from AC Milan over the issue of foreign players. He was elected the first chairman and served for only one season (1908–1909).

Contemporary accounts describe him as having a reputation among fans as a "jinx" (nicknamed "Toccaferro"), which reportedly led him to avoid attending matches. One anecdote states that he once attended a game in disguise with a fake beard and moustache, after which Inter won, helping to reduce the superstition.

In 1909, after one year, he was succeeded by Ettore Strauss in his place, following the wishes of the Swiss majority of the club's members.

He died in New York City on 11 March 1943.
