= Carlo Masseroni =

Italian entrepreneur

Chairman of Inter Milan
- In office 1942–1955
- Preceded by: Ferdinando Pozzani
- Succeeded by: Angelo Moratti

Personal details
- Born: 4 January 1891 Milan, Kingdom of Italy
- Died: 30 January 1957 (aged 66) Sanremo, Italy
- Occupation: Entrepreneur
- Known for: Former chairman of Inter Milan

Carlo Rinaldo Masseroni (4 January 1891 – 30 January 1957) was an Italian entrepreneur and the owner of Inter Milan from 1942 to 1955.

In November 1931, he became a founding partner of Ursus Gomma in Vigevano, a company specialising in producing PVC footwear.

Masseroni became Inter Milan's 14th chairman in 1942, during the height of World War II, at a time when the club had been renamed Ambrosiana by order of the fascist regime. It was thanks to him that the club reclaimed its original name, Internazionale. He led the club until 1955, during which time Inter won the 1952–53 and 1953–54 Serie A titles.

In 1955, he sold the club to Angelo Moratti. He died of a heart attack in Sanremo on 30 January 1957.

== See also ==
- List of Inter Milan chairmen
