= List of Inter Milan chairmen =

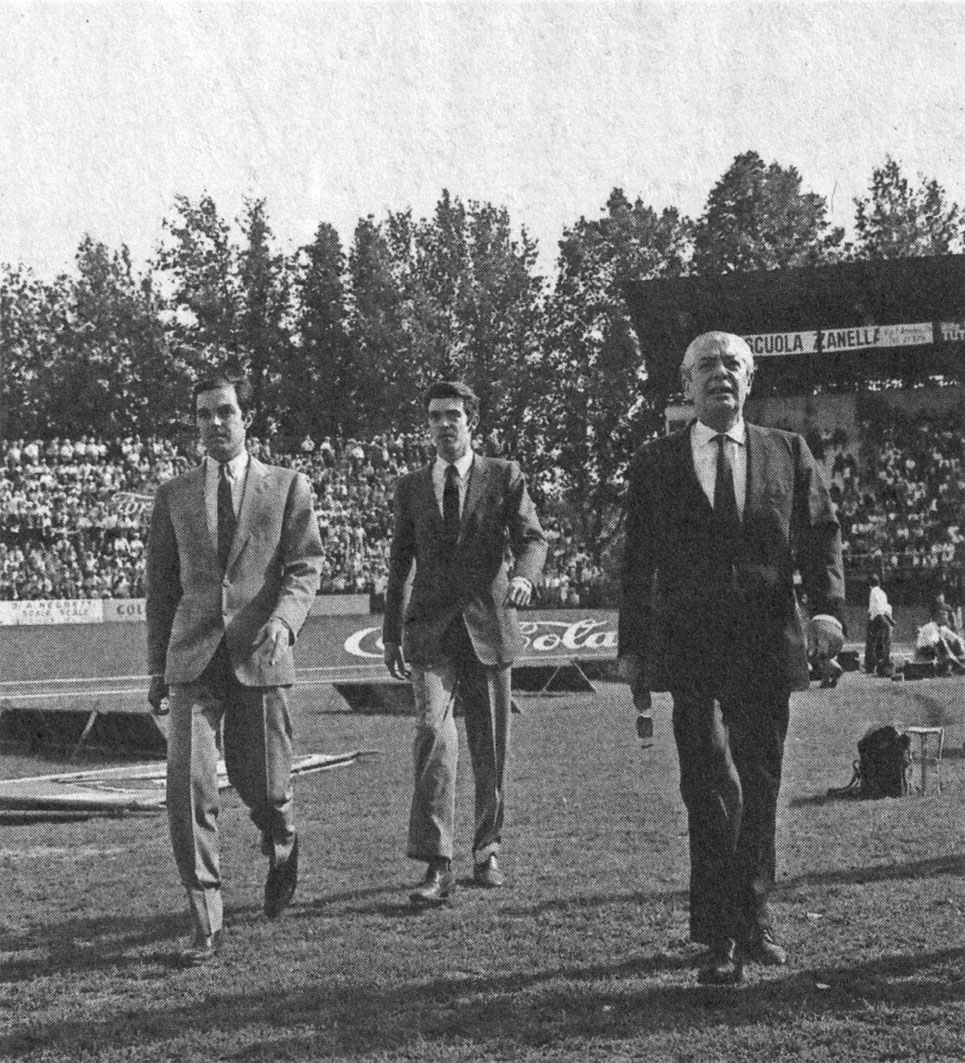
Gian Marco, Massimo and Angelo Moratti in 1967.

The following is a list of chairmen of Football Club Internazionale Milano.

== History ==
The first president of Inter Milan history was Giovanni Paramithiotti, who was also one of the founders of the club. Paramithiotti was succeeded by Ettore Strauss just one year later following a decision from the club's associates.

The longest-running presidency was Massimo Moratti's, who bought the club from Ernesto Pellegrini in 1995. Moratti served non-continuously as president from 1995 to 2013, with two resignations in the process: firstly in May 2009, revoked the following July, and secondly from January 2004 to November 2006, where the role was given to Giacinto Facchetti until his death.

Massimo Moratti's presidency was also the most victorious in the history of the club, winning 16 trophies from 1998 to 2011 including five Serie A titles, four Coppa Italia, three Supercoppa Italiana, one UEFA Cup, one Champions League, and one FIFA Club World Cup. The second most victorious presidency was that of Massimo Moratti's father, Angelo, who was at the head of the club from 1955 to 1968, winning three Serie A titles, two Champions Leagues, and two Intercontinental Cups.

Moratti's era concluded in 2013, when the club was bought by Indonesian businessman Erik Thohir, who became the first foreign president of Inter Milan. In 2018, Thohir sold the club to Steven Zhang, who became the youngest-ever president of the club as well as the only foreign president to win a trophy.

== List of chairmen ==
Name	Years	Ref(s)
Giovanni Paramithiotti	1908–1909	
Ettore Strauss	1909–1910	
Carlo De Medici	1910–1912	
Emilio Hirzel	1912–1913	
Luigi Ansbacher	1913–1914	
Giuseppe Visconti Di Modrone	1914–1919	
Giorgio Hulss	1919–1920	
Francesco Mauro	1920–1923	
Enrico Olivetti	1923–1926	
Senatore Borletti	1926–1928	
Ernesto Torrusio	1928–1929	
Oreste Simonotti	1929–1931	

Name	Years	Ref(s)
Ferdinando Pozzani	1931–1942	
Carlo Masseroni	1942–1955	
Angelo Moratti	1955–1968	
Ivanoe Fraizzoli	1968–1984	
Ernesto Pellegrini	1984–1995	
Massimo Moratti	1995–2004	
Giacinto Facchetti	2004–2006	
Massimo Moratti	2006–2013	
Erick Thohir	2013–2018	
Steven Zhang	2018–2024	
Giuseppe Marotta	2024–present	
