= Ivanoe Fraizzoli =

Italian businessman (1916–1999)

Chairman of Inter Milan
- In office 1968–1984
- Preceded by: Angelo Moratti
- Succeeded by: Ernesto Pellegrini

Personal details
- Born: 2 May 1916 Milan, Kingdom of Italy
- Died: 8 September 1999 (aged 83) Milan, Italy
- Occupation: Businessman
- Known for: Chairman of Inter Milan

Ivanoe Fraizzoli (2 May 1916 – 8 September 1999) was an Italian businessman and the owner of Inter Milan from 1968 to 1984.

== Life and career ==
In 1923, his father Leonardo founded the Fabbrica Italiana di Uniformi Civili (in English: "Italian Factory of Civil Uniforms"), a company specialised in workwear and uniforms meant for civil use, which Ivanoe inherited. The company was later renamed to Manifattura Fraizzoli.

In 1960, Fraizzoli became a sporting director at Inter Milan, before purchasing the club from Angelo Moratti in 1968, becoming the club's 16th chairman.

Under his ownership, Inter purchased players such as Evaristo Beccalossi, Alessandro Altobelli, Roberto Boninsegna, and Fulvio Collovati, winning two Scudetto (1970–71 and 1979–80) and two Coppa Italia (1977–78 and 1981–82).

In 1984, he sold the club to Ernesto Pellegrini.
