= Villa San Pietro =

Villa San Pietro Santu Perdu (Sardinian)
- Comune
- Comune di Villa San Pietro
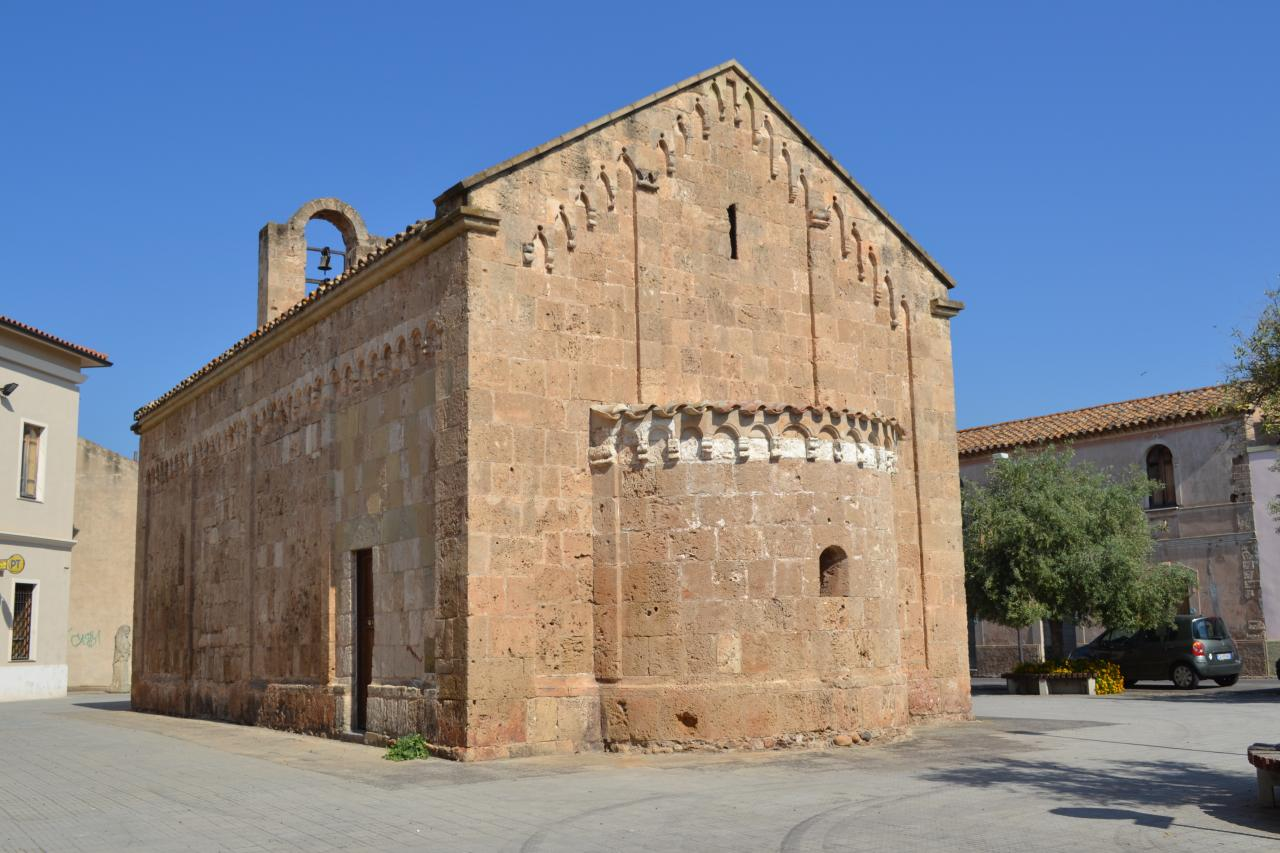

- Location within Sardinia
- Coordinates: 39°2′N 9°0′E
- Country: Italy
- Region: Sardinia
- Metropolitan city: Cagliari (CA)

Government
  - Mayor: Marina Madeddu

Area
  - Total: 39.6 km^{2} (15.3 sq mi)
- Elevation: 37 m (121 ft)

Population (2025)
  - Total: 2,107
  - Density: 53.2/km^{2} (138/sq mi)
- Demonym: Sampietresi
- Time zone: UTC+1 (CET)
  - Summer (DST): UTC+2 (CEST)
- Postal code: 09010
- Dialing code: 070

Villa San Pietro (Sardinian: Santu Perdu) is a comune (municipality) in the Metropolitan City of Cagliari in the Italian region of Sardinia, located about 25 kilometres (16 mi) southwest of Cagliari. It has 2,107 inhabitants.

Villa San Pietro borders the following municipalities: Assemini, Pula, Santadi and Sarroch.

== Demographics ==
Historical population

Year	Pop.	±%
1861	418	—
1871	398	−4.8%
1881	407	+2.3%
1901	358	−12.0%
1911	416	+16.2%
1921	401	−3.6%
1931	484	+20.7%
1936	488	+0.8%

Year	Pop.	±%
1951	624	+27.9%
1961	664	+6.4%
1971	748	+12.7%
1981	1,174	+57.0%
1991	1,574	+34.1%
2001	1,778	+13.0%
2011	2,009	+13.0%
2021	2,165	+7.8%

Source: ISTAT
