= Angelo Moratti =

Italian oil tycoon (1909–1981)

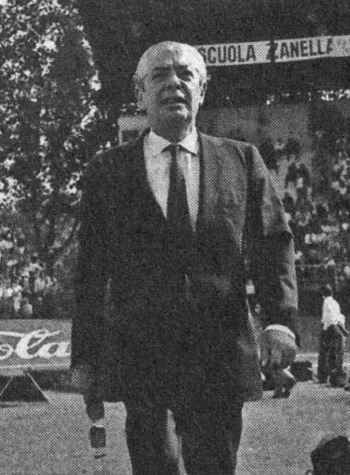
- Moratti in 1967

Chairman of Inter Milan
- In office 1955–1968
- Preceded by: Carlo Masseroni
- Succeeded by: Ivanoe Fraizzoli

Personal details
- Born: 5 November 1909 Somma Lombardo, Italy
- Died: 12 August 1981 (aged 71) Viareggio, Italy
- Spouse: Erminia Cremonesi
- Children: 6 (1 adoptive): Adriana (1932); Gianmarco (1936); Mariarosa (Bedy) (1939); Massimo (1945); Gioia; Natalino
- Occupation: Oil businessman Owner of Inter Milan

Angelo Moratti (5 November 1909 – 12 August 1981) was an Italian oil tycoon and the former owner of Inter Milan from 1955 to 1968.

== Biography ==
In 1962, after a long history in the oil business, Moratti founded Saras S.p.A., an energy multinational corporation with operations in petroleum refining, marketing, transportation and power generation.

In 1955, he became the owner and chairman of Serie A football club Inter Milan. Under his ownership and Helenio Herrera's coaching, Inter thrived, earning the nickname of Grande Inter for their national and international success. Angelo Moratti was the second most victorious owner in the history of the club, behind his son Massimo who owned the club from 1995 to 2004, and from 2006 to 2013.
