= Giorgos Iosifidis =

Cypriot footballer (born 1969)

Personal information
- Full name: Georgios Iosifidis
- Date of birth: January 8, 1969 (age 57)
- Place of birth: Limassol, Cyprus
- Position: Midfielder

Senior career*
Years	Team	Apps	(Gls)
1989–1998	Apollon Limassol	159	(22)
1998–2001	Anorthosis Famagusta	56	(3)
2001–2003	Apollon Limassol	24	(0)
2003–2005	Aris Limassol	1	(0)
Total		293	(25)

International career
1989–1999	Cyprus	4	(0)

Managerial career
- 2005–2006: Aris Limassol (assistant manager)
- 2006–2008: Apollon Limassol (U21 manager)
- 2007–2010: Apollon Limassol (assistant manager)
- 2011–2015: Karmiotissa Pano Polemidion
- 2015–: Enosis Neon Parekklisia
- * Club domestic league appearances and goals

Giorgos Iosifidis (Greek: Γιώργος Ιωσηφίδης; born January 8, 1969) is a former international Cypriot football midfielder and current football manager of Enosis Neon Parekklisia in the Cypriot Second Division.

He started his career in 1989 with Apollon Limassol. He also played for Anorthosis Famagusta and Aris Limassol.
