= Oil (film) =

- Directed by: Massimiliano Mazzotta; Monica Assari
- Produced by: Massimiliano Mazzotta
- Narrated by: Mauro Negri
- Cinematography: Francesco and M. Mazzotta; M. Sulis
- Edited by: Massimiliano Mazzotta
- Release date: 2009
- Running time: 76 min
- Country: Italy
- Languages: Italian, (English Subtitles)

Oil is a 2009 documentary film directed by Massimiliano Mazzotta. It explores the Italian energy provider Saras S.p.A., operating in the area of oil refining and the production of electricity, located in the island of Sardinia, near Cagliari and the impact of oil development on the land and lives of the local population.

== Awards ==
- Best Documentary – Section Italian Documentaries Italian Environmental Film Festival, 2009
