= Andrea Seno =

Italian footballer (born 1966)

Personal information
- Date of birth: February 1, 1966 (age 60)
- Place of birth: Burano, Italy
- Height: 1.78 m (5 ft 10 in)
- Position: Midfielder

Senior career*
Years	Team	Apps	(Gls)
1982–1983	Miranese	13	(0)
1983–1986	Padova	21	(1)
1986–1987	Venezia	14	(0)
1987–1988	Pievigina	28	(3)
1988–1990	Treviso	65	(12)
1990–1992	Como	65	(4)
1992–1994	Foggia	53	(2)
1994–1996	Internazionale	26	(2)
1996–1997	Bologna	11	(0)
1997–1998	Padova	13	(0)
- * Club domestic league appearances and goals

Andrea Seno (born February 1, 1966) is an Italian former footballer who played as a midfielder. He made nearly 300 appearances in the Italian professional leagues, including 90 in Serie A.
