= Massimo Moratti =

Italian oil tycoon (born 1945)

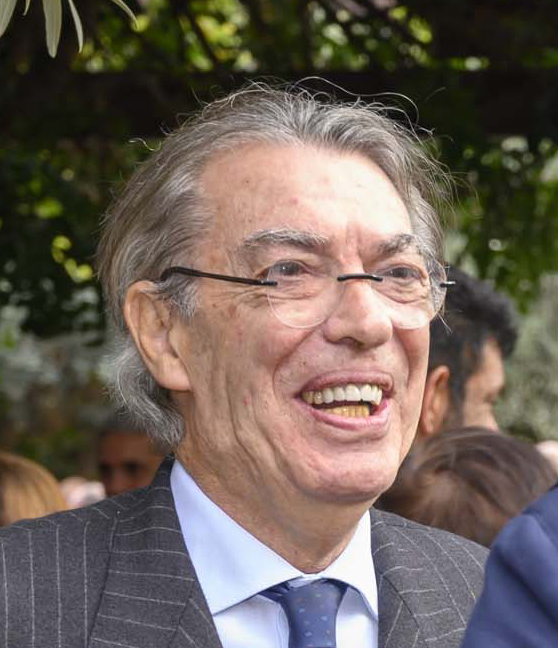
- Moratti in 2018

Chairman of Inter Milan
- In office 2006–2013
- Preceded by: Giacinto Facchetti
- Succeeded by: Erick Thohir
- In office 1995–2004
- Preceded by: Ernesto Pellegrini
- Succeeded by: Giacinto Facchetti

Personal details
- Born: 16 May 1945 (age 81) Bosco Chiesanuova, Kingdom of Italy
- Spouse: Milly Moratti (m. 1971)
- Children: 5
- Occupation: Businessman
- Known for: Chairman of Saras; Former chairman of Inter Milan

Massimo Moratti (born 16 May 1945) is an Italian billionaire petroleum businessman, the former owner of Inter Milan and chairman of the Saras Group, founded in 1962 by his father, industrialist Angelo Moratti. The main production site of the Saras Group is the Sarroch refinery located on the island of Sardinia, one of Europe's only six supersites, with a capacity of 300,000 barrels per day, representing 15% of refining capacity in Italy. In recent years, initially to enable independence of the Sarroch refinery from terms of energy, the Saras Group has entered into the production of electricity and is expanding its production of alternative energy sources, particularly in the field of wind energy, through its subsidiaries Sarlux and Sardeolica, the latter of which is controlled indirectly through the company Eolici Ulassai.

From 1995 until 2013, Moratti was the chairman of Inter Milan. He is said to have spent around €1.5 billion of his personal fortune in the transfer market, and was famous for signing numerous football superstars such as Ronaldo in 1997.

He was Inter's honorary chairman, and also a United Nations goodwill ambassador. In 2013, he was inducted into the Italian Football Hall of Fame.

== Life and career ==
Moratti is the fourth son of industrialist Angelo Moratti, who was the chairman of Inter Milan during the team's "Golden Age" from 1955 to 1968. Born in the family villa in the Bosco Chiesanuova, close to Verona, he graduated from Libera Università Internazionale degli Studi Sociali Guido Carli with a master's degree in political science.

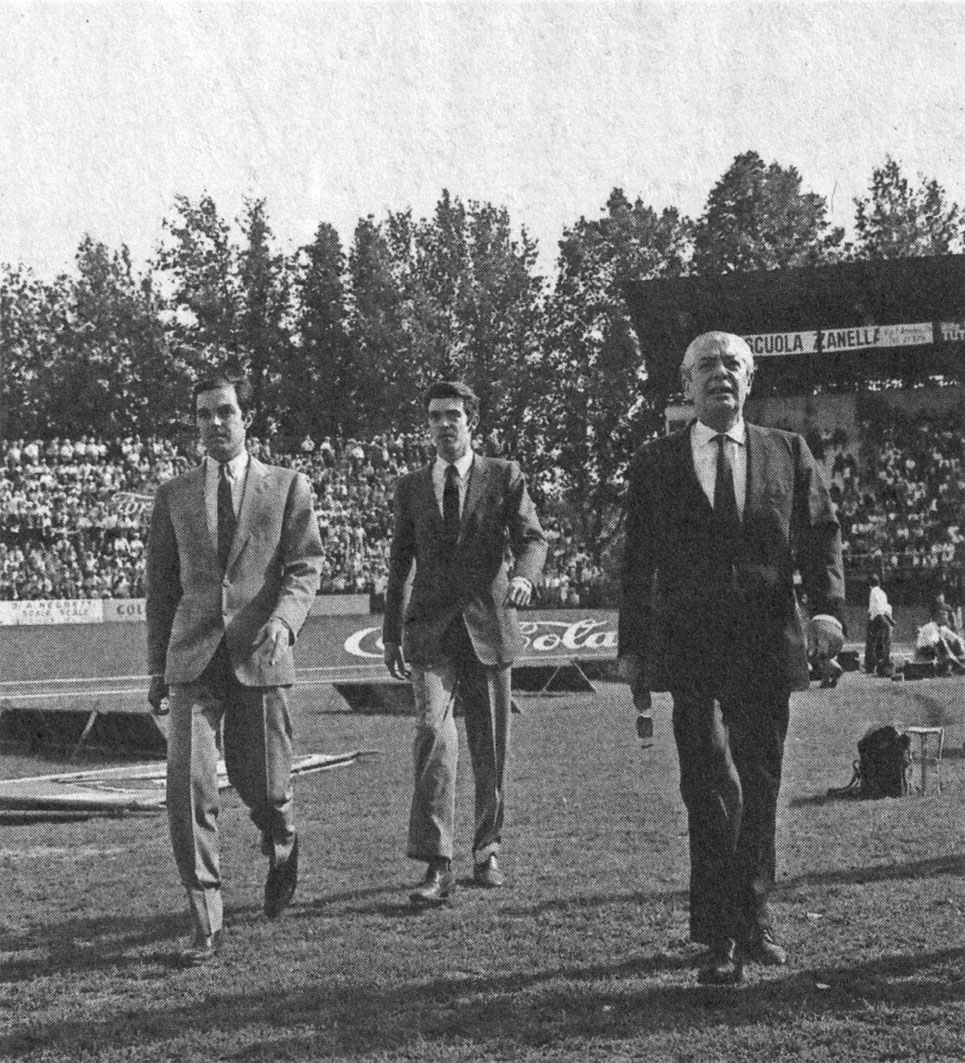
Gian Marco, Massimo and Angelo Moratti in 1967

Letizia Moratti, his sister-in-law, was the Mayor of Milan from 2006 until 2011.

On his father's death, Moratti inherited his shares in the Saras Group, engaged in the refining of petroleum, where he is presently CEO. Moratti is also the owner of Sarlux, headquartered in Cagliari, which focuses on the production of electricity from waste oil.

Married to the environmental activist Emilia Moratti (née Bossi), the couple have five children. In September 2009, Sauro Gori announced that Moratti had been appointed a United Nations goodwill ambassador.

In May 2011, Moratti supported Giuliano Pisapia's bid to become mayor of Milan against his sister-in-law Letizia. His call for 'change' was perceived as an extension of his rivalry with A.C. Milan's president, Silvio Berlusconi, from football to the political sphere.

In April 2020, he was ranked by Forbes at number 1513 in the world's billionaires list, with a net worth of $1.4 billion.

== Chairman of Inter ==
Moratti took over as chairman of Inter from Ernesto Pellegrini in 1995, during a period where many considered Inter to be underachievers. During the 18 years of his leadership, Inter clinched five Scudetti/Serie A in a row from 2006 to 2010 (equalling the then-all-time record), four Coppa Italia titles (2005, 2006, 2010, 2011), four Supercoppa Italiana titles (2005, 2006, 2008, 2010), one UEFA Champions League (2010), one FIFA Club World Cup (2010) and one UEFA Cup (1998). Inter won the Scudetto, the Coppa Italia and the Champions League in the 2009–2010 season, becoming the first Italian team that managed to achieve the Treble.

Moratti is said to have spent around €1.5 billion of his personal fortune in the transfer market in his time as chairman. His most famous signing was that of Ronaldo from Barcelona in the summer of 1997, at a time when he was widely considered the best player in the world. Later, in July 1999, Moratti sanctioned a then world-record €48 million purchase of striker Christian Vieri, and has purchased numerous others, including Roberto Carlos, Hernán Crespo, Adriano, Iván Zamorano, Maicon, Roberto Baggio, Zlatan Ibrahimović, Luís Figo, Patrick Vieira, Samuel Eto'o, Alvaro Recoba and Wesley Sneijder.

However, criticism also been levelled against Moratti, as he fired coaches frequently. Except keeping Giuseppe Baresi and Daniele Bernazzani as backroom staff in the first team or in the youth system, as well as Marco Branca as one of the directors, the team had changed from Rafael Benítez, Leonardo, Gasperini and Ranieri in just two seasons. Roberto Mancini and José Mourinho were the only two trophy winning and longest serving coaches in recent years. Before Mancini, Moratti employed more than ten short-lived coaches, including Roy Hodgson, Marcello Lippi, Marco Tardelli, Héctor Cúper and Alberto Zaccheroni.

The next day after Ranieri was dismissed, chief scout of the first team Giovanni Battista Lanfranchi was fired and replaced by the former technical commission of Udinese, Valentino Angeloni. Lanfranchi had served for Inter for 13 years in different positions.

In November 2013, International Sports Capital took control of 70% of the club. Indonesian businessman Erick Thohir, a part-owner of that company, was elected chairman of Inter, but Moratti remained with the club as the honorary chairman.

In June 2016, Moratti's Internazionale Holding S.r.l. sold all its stake in Inter Milan to Erick Thohir's Nusantara Sports Ventures HK Limited for €60 million (and re-sold to Zhang Jindong's Suning Holdings Group). As of 2018, Moratti's wife, Milly Moratti, remained in the advisory board of Inter. However, Moratti himself, was no longer the honorary chairman of the club. Other members of the Moratti family, Angelomario Moratti, Carlotta Moratti, Giovanni Moratti, remained as members of the board of a subsidiary of the club, Inter Futura.
