= Massimo Paganin =

Italian footballer

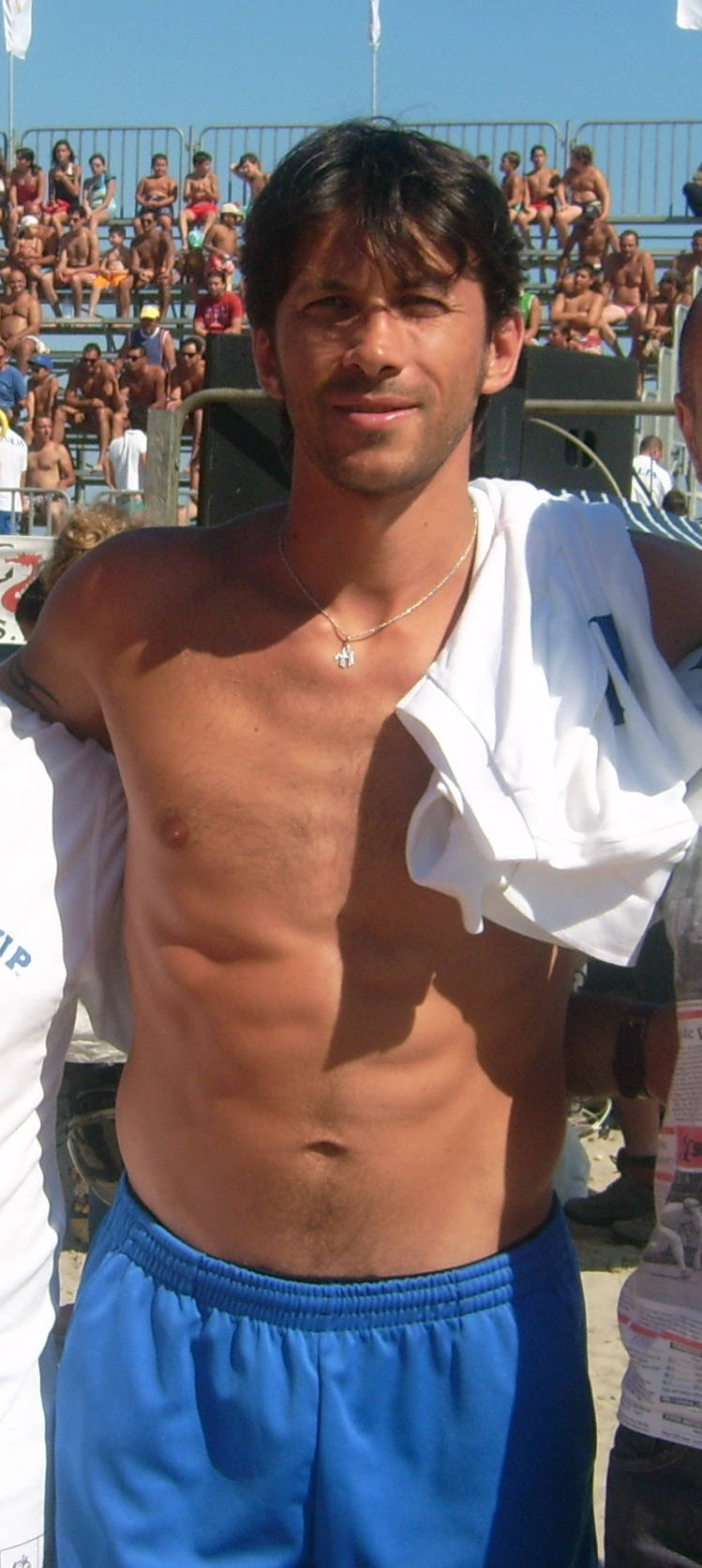
- Paganin before a beach soccer match

Personal information
- Date of birth: 19 July 1970 (age 56)
- Place of birth: Vicenza, Italy
- Height: 1.85 m (6 ft 1 in)
- Position: Defender

Senior career*
Years	Team	Apps	(Gls)
1986–1987	Bassano Virtus	2	(0)
1987–1989	Fiorentina	0	(0)
1989–1992	Reggiana	45	(0)
1992–1993	Brescia	30	(1)
1993–1997	Internazionale	107	(1)
1997–2000	Bologna	70	(1)
2000–2002	Atalanta	48	(0)
2002–2003	Sampdoria	6	(0)
2003–2005	Vicenza	80	(0)
2005–2006	Akratitos	10	(0)

Managerial career
- 2024-: Latvia (assistant coach)
- * Club domestic league appearances and goals

Massimo Paganin (born 19 July 1970) is an Italian former professional footballer, who played as a defender; he played both as a centre-back, as well as in the position of full-back. Since February 2024, he has been the assistant coach to Paolo Nicolato, the head coach of the Latvia national football team.

== Career ==
Paganin was born in Vicenza. Massimo's brother, Antonio Paganin, also played football professionally. The siblings played together for Internazionale, and won the 1993–94 UEFA Cup at the club. Throughout his career, Massimo Paganin played for many different clubs in addition to Inter, such as Fiorentina (the club with whom he began his youth career), Reggiana, Brescia, Bologna, Atalanta, Sampdoria, Vicenza, before ending his career in Greece with Akratitos. He also won the 1998 UEFA Intertoto Cup during his three seasons with Bologna (1997–2000), which allowed the club to qualify for the UEFA Cup.

== Honours ==
Inter

- UEFA Cup: 1993–94

Bologna

- UEFA Intertoto Cup: 1998
