= Stefano Ricci =

Italian luxury lifestyle brand

Stefano Ricci S.p.A.
- Type: Private
- Founded: 1972; 54 years ago
- Founder: Stefano Ricci
- Headquarters: Fiesole, Italy
- Area served: Worldwide
- Products: Menswear – childrenswear - homeware
- Services: Bespoke tailoring – Made-to-Measure – Interior Design
- Website: www.stefanoricci.com

Stefano Ricci (Italian pronunciation: [ˈsteːfano ˈrittʃi]) is a private family-owned Italian luxury lifestyle brand with headquarters located in Fiesole, right outside Florence. With 78 monobrand boutiques worldwide, the brand produces menswear and accessories, a line for juniors "SR Junior", homeware "SR HOME" and lifestyle products. The brand also offers bespoke and interior design services for both yachts and residences. Stefano Ricci S.p.A. was rated as EE (average) by the London-based Standard Ethics agency for three consecutive years 2015, 2016, and 2017. The New York Times calls Stefano Ricci "clothier to the 0.001 percent".

Stefano Ricci S.p.A. employs over 800 people worldwide, and the 9000 square metre headquarters consist of office and production facilities. By 2010, Stefano Ricci S.p.A. had acquired the Antico Setificio Fiorentino S.r.l., a historic silk-weaving mill located in the Oltrarno area of Florence.

== Founding ==
The Stefano Ricci company was founded in 1972 by Florentine designer and Knight of the Order of Merit for Labour, Stefano Ricci, and his wife Claudia. Their first business location was in the family home on Via dei Niccoli, in Florence; the location remains open as the company's bespoke tailoring atelier. The current CEO is the Founder's eldest son, Niccolò Ricci, while the Creative Director, Filippo Ricci, is the founder's youngest son.

== Boutiques ==
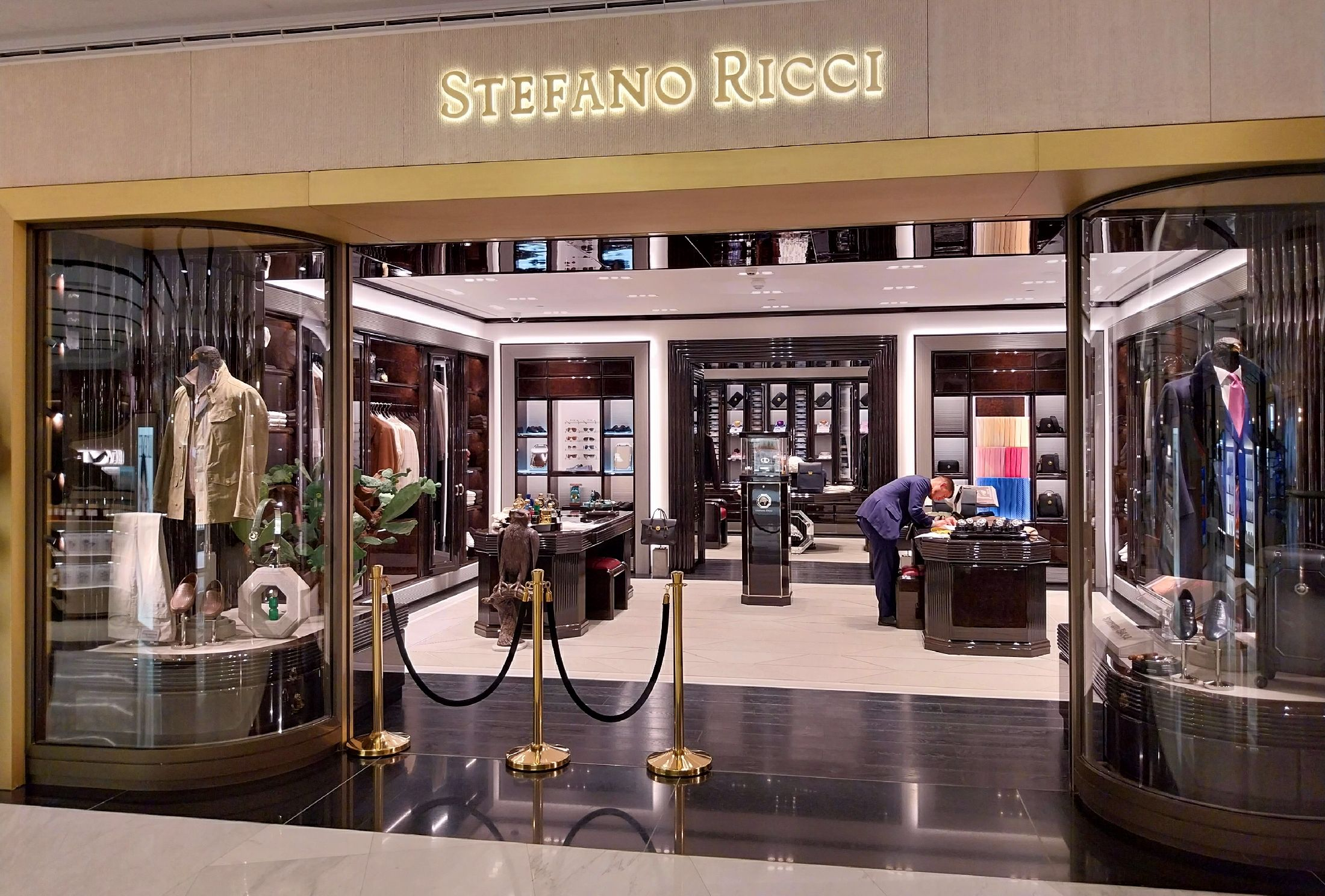
Stefano Ricci Boutique in Madrid, inaugurated in 2022

The brand's first boutique was opened in Shanghai at the Ritz Carlton hotel in 1993, introducing the brand to the Chinese market. In February 2018 Stefano Ricci inaugurated its 60th monobrand boutique in Hong Kong, located in The Peninsula Hotel. Other flagship stores followed, including Beverly Hills (2001), New York (2005), Florence and Milan (2009), Moscow and Baku (2013), London (2016), and Vancouver (2018). All Stefano Ricci boutiques are characterised by a use of hand-worked materials such as Californian briar-root wood with brown and black variants, Tuscan travertine, pietra serena, and crocodile leather.

== Production ==
The company's original production was based on Italian handmade ties, with the first commercial collection debuting at Pitti Uomo in 1974.

Every Stefano Ricci product is manufactured 100% Made in Italy , including the design, manufacture and finishing of merchandise. The company produces dress shirts, handmade ties, suits, casualwear, sportswear, outerwear, footwear, leather goods, eyewear, cufflinks, fragrances, wine, stationery, tableware, crystalware, fine linens, and furniture.

The company has a specialized internal workshop for goldsmiths and silversmiths, who create precious belt buckles, hardware for leather goods, and home items, all according to the Florentine tradition.

== Brand identity ==
The symbol of Stefano Ricci is the eagle, an emblematic trait for the brand, which is found on merchandise as well as the store mannequins which display bronze eagle heads.

The company has partnered with Florence's museums for fashion events. Stefano Ricci S.p.A. remains the first and only company to have had a fashion show inside of the Galleria degli Uffizi (2012, 40th Anniversary event); the SR Junior line was launched with a fashion show within the Museo dell’Opera del Duomo; and the Sala Bianca within the Palazzo Pitti was reopened to use for fashion during the company's 45th Anniversary event in 2017.

== Luxor 50th anniversary event ==
In 2022, the company Stefano Ricci celebrated its 50th anniversary. To mark the occasion, a celebratory fashion show was organized at the Temple of Hatshepsut in Luxor. This was the first time Egypt authorized the use of its temples for fashion events. More than 700 people were involved in the organization of the event. The fashion show was attended by notable figures from the Egyptian government, including the Minister of Tourism and Antiquities Ahmed Eissa Abou Hussein, the Secretary-General of the Supreme Council of Antiquities Mostafa Waziri, and the Egyptologist and archaeologist Zahi Hawass, who welcomed the guests aboard the Nile with a lecture on ancient Thebes.

The event hosted 400 guests from 50 different countries. Andrea Bocelli opened the show with "Celeste Aida" and later performed a duet with his son Matteo on the song "Fall on Me". Soprano Susanna Rigacci was also present at the fashion show. The grand finale featured Stefano Ricci, the designer and founder, accompanied by his son Filippo, the creative director, as they walked down the steps of the Temple of Hatshepsut to the notes of "Nessun Dorma" by Andrea Bocelli.

During the evening, a video message from Zenani Mandela, daughter of Nelson Mandela, was broadcast, in which she recalled her father's long friendship with the designer. In honor of the former South African president, a capsule collection of silk shirts in shades of red, blue, and yellow was revealed.

== The Explorer Project ==
Since 2023, Stefano Ricci included its seasonal campaigns into the broader Explorer Project, an initiative focusing on global exploration and environmental conservation. The aim of the project is to showcase the new menswear collections in scenic locations. The claim of the campaigns is Explore the world to explore ourselves.

The project began with the Fall/Winter 2023/2024 collection, which featured Iceland's dramatic landscapes including the black sand beaches of Reykjanesbaer and Reynisfjara, as well as the Skògafoss waterfall and Diamond Beach. The campaign involved National Geographic photographer Chris Rainier and Terry D. Garcia, CEO of Exploration Ventures LLC .

For the Spring/Summer 2024 collection, the project shifted its focus to the Galápagos Islands. This phase was conducted in collaboration with the Charles Darwin Foundation and was overseen by Terry D. Garcia and Mattias Klum, a National Geographic Fellow. The campaign aimed to highlight biodiversity and conservation efforts in the archipelago ("Galápagos Expedition Showcases Conservation Efforts," National Geographic, March 2024).

The Fall/Winter 2024/2025 collection took the project to Mongolia, where it partnered with The Kazakh Falconry Association to promote the preservation of traditional falconry and the golden eagle. Terry D. Garcia and Chris Rainier returned to contribute their expertise to this phase of the project .

== Philanthropy ==
The company engages philanthropically with the city of Florence; in 2012 it donated lighting for the Loggia dei Lanzi in Piazza della Signoria, in 2013 it funded the restoration of historic volumes on the Art of Silk and the Art of Wool from the Florence State Archive, and in 2014 it donated new lighting for the Ponte Vecchio.

Stefano Ricci S.p.A. and the Antico Setificio Fiorentino S.r.l have supported the Andrea Bocelli Foundation and the Mohamed Alì Parkinson Center by hosting galas during the annual Celebrity Fight Night event; the most recent were located in the cloisters of Santa Croce, Florence, in 2016, and at the Palazzo Colonna, Rome, in 2017.

== See also ==
- Italian fashion
- Made in Italy
- Brioni
- Hermès,
- Loro Piana
- Brunello Cucinelli
- Zegna
