= Francesco Dell'Anno =

Italian footballer

Personal information
- Date of birth: 4 June 1967
- Place of birth: Baiano, Italy
- Height: 1.75 m (5 ft 9 in)
- Position: Midfielder

Youth career
- Lazio

Senior career*
Years	Team	Apps	(Gls)
1984–1986	Lazio	35	(0)
1986–1988	Arezzo	28	(1)
1988–1989	Taranto	33	(1)
1989–1990	Arezzo	30	(3)
1990–1993	Udinese	98	(10)
1993–1996	Inter	40	(1)
1996–1997	Salernitana	27	(1)
1997–2001	Ravenna	91	(23)
2001–2002	Ternana	29	(1)
Total		411	(41)
- * Club domestic league appearances and goals

Francesco Dell'Anno (born 4 June 1967) is an Italian former professional footballer who played as an attacking midfielder.

== Playing career ==
An Italian playmaker, Dell'Anno began his career at Lazio and made his debut in the 1984–85 season, and his emergence was one of the few highlights of a dismal season for the Biancocelesti. He moved on to Arezzo and Taranto before joining Udinese in 1990.

Dell'Anno spent three seasons with Udinese, earning considerable praise for his displays in midfield during this time. A move to Internazionale followed, but he was unable to command a regular place before moving to Salernitana. His career enjoyed a renaissance after a move to Ravenna, before ending his career at Ternana.

== Personal life ==
While playing for Lazio, Dell'Anno was engaged to the female Lazio footballer Eva Russo. The engagement broke off after four years.
