= Antonio Manicone =

Italian footballer and manager (born 1966)

Personal information
- Date of birth: 27 October 1966 (age 59)
- Place of birth: Milan, Italy
- Height: 1.74 m (5 ft 9 in)
- Position: Midfielder

Senior career*
Years	Team	Apps	(Gls)
1985–1986	Internazionale	0	(0)
1986–1987	Licata	32	(1)
1987–1989	Palermo	65	(4)
1989–1991	Foggia	67	(0)
1991–1992	Udinese	41	(3)
1992–1996	Internazionale	58	(1)
1994–1995	→ Genoa (loan)	25	(1)
1996–1998	Perugia	24	(0)
1998–1999	Cosenza	17	(0)
1999–2000	Lecco	36	(0)
2000–2003	Pro Patria	70	(1)

International career
1993	Italy	1	(0)

Managerial career
- 2004–2012: Internazionale (youth teams)
- 2012–2013: S.S. Lazio (assistant manager)
- 2014–2021: Switzerland (assistant manager)
- 2021–2022: Bordeaux (assistant manager)
- 2023–2026: Iran (assistant manager)
- * Club domestic league appearances and goals

Antonio Manicone (Italian pronunciation: [anˈtɔːnjo maniˈkoːne]; born 27 October 1966) is an Italian professional football manager and a former player, who functioned as a midfielder, both as a defensive midfielder, and as a deep-lying playmaker.

== Career ==
Despite playing for several Italian clubs throughout his career, Manicone spent several years with Serie A side Inter (1992–96), the team with which he began his career for a season in 1985, winning the UEFA Cup with the club in 1994.

During his time with the Milan club, he earned his only international cap for Italy under manager Arrigo Sacchi, in a 3–0 away win over Estonia in a 1994 World Cup qualifying match on 22 September 1993.

Following his retirement as a player in 2003, he later pursued a career as a manager. He was an assistant of Vladimir Petković for S.S. Lazio.

== Style of play ==
Manicone was a versatile midfielder who was deployed in several roles, including as an advanced playmaker, as a deep-lying playmaker, and also as a defensive midfielder. He was noted for his work rate, physicality, and ability to regain possession, as well as his vision and long passing, which enabled him to initiate attacking plays.

== Personal life ==
Manicone's son Carlo Manicone is also a professional footballer who plays for FC Lugano in Switzerland. His nephew, Lorenzo Malagrida, is also a professional footballer.

== Honours ==
Inter

- UEFA Cup: 1993–94
