= Marco Barollo =

Italian footballer

Personal information
- Date of birth: 31 July 1972 (age 54)
- Place of birth: Milan, Italy
- Height: 1.79 m (5 ft 10 1/2 in)
- Position: Midfielder

Senior career*
Years	Team	Apps	(Gls)
1989–1992	Internazionale	0	(0)
1991–1992	Lecce	14	(1)
1992–1993	Ternana	21	(1)
1993–1994	Lecce	9	(0)
1994	Internazionale	1	(0)
1994–1995	Venezia	31	(0)
1996–1999	Brescia	65	(1)
1999–2000	Cesena	34	(4)
2000–2003	Empoli	43	(2)
- * Club domestic league appearances and goals

Marco Barollo (born 31 July 1972 in Milan) is an Italian former professional footballer.
