= 1909–10 Prima Categoria =

13th season of top-tier Italian football

Prima Categoria
- Season: 1909–10
- Champions: Internazionale; 1st title
- Top goalscorer: Ernest Peterly (22)

The 1909-10 Prima Categoria was the thirteenth edition of the Italian Football Championship and the seventh since the rebrand to Prima Categoria. This was the first season in which the Italian Football Championship was contested in all-round-robin format, (other than the excluding the tie-break play-off that was ultimately needed). The play-off was won by Internazionale. Their play-off opponents and champions of the two previous and three subsequent seasons were Pro Vercelli. Vercelli fielded a team of 15-year-old boys to protest against the scheduling of the play-off that season. This was Inter’s first title as Italian champions.

== Regulation ==
Following the creation of the Italy national football team, the Italian Football Federation revamped its championship. The round robin was introduced in Italy this season. The competition was expanded from eight clubs the previous season to nine. All clubs came from the 3 Northern Italian regions of Liguria, Lombardy and Piedmont.

Registration was free and only subject to a quality committee. The eight clubs of the last years were joined by Ausonia, a Milanese car factory‘s club which paid the enrolment tax to try the experience of a national football championship.

== Final classification ==
| Pos | Team | Pld | W | D | L | GF | GA | GD | Pts | Qualification or relegation |
|---|---|---|---|---|---|---|---|---|---|---|
| 1 | Internazionale (C) | 16 | 12 | 1 | 3 | 55 | 26 | +29 | 25 | Tie-breaker required |
| 2 | Pro Vercelli | 16 | 12 | 1 | 3 | 46 | 15 | +31 | 25 | Tie-breaker required |
| 3 | Juventus | 16 | 8 | 2 | 6 | 28 | 19 | +9 | 18 | |
| 4 | Torino | 16 | 8 | 1 | 7 | 43 | 30 | +13 | 17 | |
| 4 | Genoa | 16 | 7 | 3 | 6 | 29 | 23 | +6 | 17 | |
| 6 | Milan | 16 | 6 | 1 | 9 | 23 | 36 | −13 | 13 | |
| 6 | US Milanese | 16 | 6 | 1 | 9 | 35 | 53 | −18 | 13 | |
| 8 | Andrea Doria | 16 | 5 | 1 | 10 | 18 | 39 | −21 | 11 | |
| 9 | Ausonia Milano (E) | 16 | 0 | 5 | 11 | 16 | 52 | −36 | 5 | Financial crisis |

Source: Panini
(C) Champions; (E) Eliminated

== Results table ==
| Home \ Away | ADO | AUS | GEN | INT | JUV | MIL | PVE | TOR | USM |
|---|---|---|---|---|---|---|---|---|---|
| Andrea Doria | | 3–0 | 3–0 | 1–3 | 0–1 | 1–7 | 2–0 | 3–1 | 4–2 |
| Ausonia Milano | 0–0 | | 3–3 | 2–6 | 2–2 | 2–2 | 0–4 | 0–2 | 1–4 |
| Genoa | 3–1 | 6–2 | | 4–0 | 2–0 | 0–1 | 1–2 | 0–0 | 1–0 |
| Internazionale | 5–0 | 2–2 | 2–0 | | 1–0 | 5–1 | 1–4 | 7–2 | 7–2 |
| Juventus | 4–0 | 6–0 | 0–2 | 2–0 | | 5–3 | 0–0 | 3–0 | 1–2 |
| Milan | 2–0 | 2–1 | 1–0 | 0–5 | 0–1 | | 0–3 | 0–1 | 1–0 |
| Pro Vercelli | 1–0 | 3–0 | 5–2 | 1–2 | 4–0 | 4–0 | | 0–1 | 5–1 |
| Torino | 5–0 | 2–0 | 0–2 | 3–4 | 3–1 | 6–2 | 2–4 | | 13–1 |
| US Milanese | 5–0 | 5–1 | 3–3 | 2–5 | 0–2 | 2–1 | 3–6 | 3–2 | |

Updated to match(es) played on unknown. Source: Almanacco Illustrato del Calcio - La Storia 1898-2004, Panini Edizioni, Modena, September 2005 (in Italian)
Legend: Blue = home team win; Yellow = draw; Red = away team win.

== Championship tie-breaker ==
Played in Vercelli on April 24

| Team 1 | Score | Team 2 |
|---|---|---|
| Pro Vercelli | 3-10 | Internazionale |

Pro Vercelli had previously planned to participate two football exhibitions on April 17 and 24, and asked the FIGC to postpone the tie-breaker to May 1; however, Inter was opposed playing the match on May 1 due to its own scheduled exhibitions. The FIGC granted the first postponement, but since Pro Vercelli ultimately did not take part in the April 17 exhibition, the second postponement was withdrawn and the tie-breaker was scheduled for April 24. Pro Vercelli fielded its fourth team, composed of 15-year-old boys in protest; after that, the FIGC imposed a penalty on the club for insubordination and unsportsmanlike conduct.

== References and sources ==
- Almanacco Illustrato del Calcio - La Storia 1898-2004, Panini Edizioni, Modena, September 2005
- Carlo Chiesa, La grande storia del calcio italiano, Chapter 2: Juve, scippati due titoli! Inter, l'atroce beffa, pp. 17–32, Guerin Sportivo #5, May 2012.
