= Pierluigi Orlandini =

Italian footballer

Personal information
- Full name: Pierluigi Orlandini
- Date of birth: 9 October 1972 (age 54)
- Place of birth: San Giovanni Bianco, Italy
- Height: 1.82 m (6 ft 0 in)
- Position: Midfielder

Senior career*
Years	Team	Apps	(Gls)
1989–1992	Atalanta	14	(0)
1992–1993	Lecce	29	(3)
1993–1994	Atalanta	23	(5)
1994–1996	Internazionale	30	(4)
1996–1997	Verona	30	(5)
1997–1999	Parma	24	(0)
1999–2000	Venezia	10	(1)
2000	AC Milan	2	(1)
2000–2001	Brescia	4	(0)
2001–2002	Atalanta	4	(0)
2002–2003	Brindisi	24	(2)
Total		194	(21)

International career
1992–1994	Italy U21	10	(1)
Medal record
Men's football
Representing Italy
UEFA European Under-21 Championship
Winner	1992 Europe
Winner	1994 France
- * Club domestic league appearances and goals

Pierluigi Orlandini (born 9 October 1972) is an Italian former footballer who played as a midfielder.

== Club career ==
Orlandini started his career with Atalanta in 1989, but was a fringe player and in 1992 was sold to Lecce, where he spent a season, before moving back to Atalanta. After another season long stay, he joined one of Italy's biggest clubs in 1994, Internazionale, where he spent 2 seasons, and subsequently moved to Verona in 1996. After this, he had unsuccessful spells with Parma and Venezia. In 2000, he played 2 games for AC Milan and scored 1 goal. He went on to spend the remainder of his career with Brescia, his former club Atalanta and Brindisi before retiring.

== International career ==
At international level, Orlandini also won 10 caps for the Italian under-21 team between 1992 and 1994, scoring once. The goal was the golden goal winner in the U-21 Euro Final against Portugal in the 1994 final.
