= Paolo Tramezzani =

Italian footballer (born 1970)

Personal information
- Date of birth: 30 July 1970 (age 56)
- Place of birth: Castelnovo ne' Monti, Italy
- Height: 1.85 m (6 ft 1 in)
- Position: Defender

Senior career*
Years	Team	Apps	(Gls)
1989–1996	Inter Milan	26	(0)
1989–1990	→ Prato (loan)	29	(0)
1990–1991	→ Cosenza (loan)	15	(0)
1991–1992	→ Lucchese (loan)	30	(1)
1994–1995	→ Venezia (loan)	26	(0)
1995–1996	→ Cesena (loan)	20	(2)
1996–1998	Piacenza	25	(3)
1998–2000	Tottenham Hotspur	6	(0)
2000	Pistoiese	33	(2)
2000–2003	Piacenza	35	(0)
2003	→ Atalanta (loan)	13	(1)
2003–2008	Pro Patria	78	(5)
Total		336	(14)

Managerial career
- 2016–2017: Lugano
- 2017: Sion
- 2018–2019: APOEL
- 2019–2020: Livorno
- 2020: Sion
- 2021: Hajduk Split
- 2021: Al-Faisaly
- 2021–2022: Sion
- 2023: Sion
- 2024: Istra 1961
- 2024–2025: Yverdon
- 2025: AEL Limassol
- 2026–: FC Como Women
- * Club domestic league appearances and goals

Paolo Tramezzani (born 30 July 1970) is an Italian football manager and former player, who played as a defender, who currently manages FC Como Women.

== Playing career ==
Tramezzani was born at Castelnovo ne' Monti in Emilia. At the age of nine, he joined Inter Milan, where he rose through the ranks. To gain experience, he first spent a season on loan at Prato in Serie C1, followed by a season in Serie B with Cosenza in a co-ownership deal, and then another season on loan in Serie B with Lucchese.

Inter included him in the squad for the 1992–93 season and handed him his debut on 28 October 1992 in a cup match against Foggia. He spent two seasons as a squad member at Inter but did not manage to become a regular in his preferred position at left-back. He played a total of 34 games in all competitions for Inter. He spent the two following seasons on loan at Venezia and Cesena in Serie B before being released to join fellow Serie A-side Piacenza in 1995.

Having spent two seasons in Serie A playing regularly with Piacenza, he was signed for £1.5 million by Tottenham Hotspur in the summer of 1998, managed at the time by Christian Gross. Although scoring on his debut in a friendly against Peterborough United, his time at Spurs was short-lived. He was transferred to Pistoese in Italy for £400,000. He later returned to Piacenza and spent a short spell at Atalanta, before ending his career with five seasons in Serie C1 with Pro Patria.

== Managerial career ==
From 2011 to 2016, Tramezzani was assistant coach of the Albania national team, under manager Gianni De Biasi.

On 21 December 2016, he was presented as head coach of Lugano. In June 2017, Tramezzani was appointed head coach of Sion before being sacked in October.

In October 2018, Tramezzani was appointed as the new manager of APOEL. He guided them to their seventh league title after a 3–0 home victory over Apollon Limassol, and also reached the final of the Cypriot Cup, where they lost 0–2 to AEL Limassol.

Tramezzani was sacked on 8 August 2019 following a 1–2 loss against Qarabağ in the first leg of the UEFA Champions League third qualifying round.

On 10 December 2019, he was hired by Serie B club Livorno, in last place in the league table at the time. He was dismissed by Livorno on 3 February 2020 after the team only achieved 2 draws and 5 losses in 7 games under Tramezzani's helm.

In June 2020, he returned to FC Sion for a second spell as manager of the club. On 18 January 2021, he was appointed by Hajduk Split as head coach. He finished the season in fourth place, taking Hajduk to the Europa Conference League second qualifying round, before leaving the club on 27 May by mutual consent.

On 18 June 2021, Tramezzani was appointed as the manager of Saudi Arabian club Al-Faisaly.

He successively signed for Swiss Super League club FC Sion, being later replaced by Fabio Celestini on 21 November 2022. Following a five-game win drought and a humiliating 2–7 defeat at home to FC St. Gallen on 12 November 2022, he was terminated on 20 November 2022. On 16 May 2023, he was once again appointed as head coach of Sion, as he was still under contract. He coached the final games of the season, including the relegation play-off, which saw Sion relegated from the Super League.

On 8 February 2024, Tramezzani returned to Croatia, becoming the coach of Croatian Football League team Istra 1961.

He returns to the Swiss Super League on 28 December 2024, after being appointed as the new head coach of Yverdon-Sport FC.

In July 2025, Tramezzani was appointed as the manager of Cyprian club AEL Limassol, but in November was sacked.

On 10 February 2026, Tramezzani was announced at FC Como Women.

== Personal life ==
Following Albania's historic participation at UEFA Euro 2016, Tramezzani was among the members of the national team who were issued diplomatic passports by the Albanian government in recognition of their achievement.

== Managerial statistics ==
As of 6 June 2023

Managerial record by team and tenure
Team	From	To	Record							
Team	From	To	G	W	D	L	GF	GA	GD	Win %
Lugano	21 December 2016	15 June 2017	18	11	2	5	29	26	+3	61.11
Sion	15 June 2017	22 October 2017	16	4	5	7	23	23	+0	25.00
APOEL	10 October 2018	8 August 2019	39	24	10	5	79	27	+52	61.54
Livorno	10 December 2019	3 February 2020	7	0	2	5	6	15	−9	0.00
Sion	3 June 2020	25 August 2020	15	5	4	6	15	18	−3	33.33
Hajduk Split	18 January 2021	27 May 2021	24	14	4	6	31	19	+12	58.33
Al-Faisaly	18 June 2021	7 October 2021	7	2	3	2	9	10	−1	28.57
Sion	8 October 2021	21 November 2022	46	17	10	19	65	76	−11	36.96
Sion	16 May 2023	15 June 2023	5	0	0	5	3	14	−11	0.00
Total			177	77	40	60	258	227	+31	43.50

== Honours ==
=== Player ===
Inter Milan

- UEFA Cup: 1993–94

=== Manager ===
APOEL

- Cypriot First Division: 2018–19
