= Davide Fontolan =

Italian footballer (born 1966)

Personal information
- Date of birth: 24 February 1966 (age 60)
- Place of birth: Garbagnate Milanese, Italy
- Height: 1.82 m (6 ft 0 in)
- Position: Winger

Senior career*
Years	Team	Apps	(Gls)
1982–1986	Legnano	67	(8)
1986–1987	Parma	31	(6)
1987–1988	Udinese	25	(5)
1988–1990	Genoa	67	(15)
1990–1996	Inter Milan	127	(11)
1996–2000	Bologna	82	(7)
2000–2001	Cagliari	9	(2)
Total		408	(54)
- * Club domestic league appearances and goals

Davide Fontolan (born 24 February 1966) is an Italian former professional footballer who played as a midfielder, usually as a left winger.

== Club career ==
Fontolan was born in Garbagnate Milanese, Province of Milan. He started his playing career with Serie C side Legnano, and moved to Parma in 1986 after four seasons with the lilla. In 1987, he played for Udinese, and from 1988 to 1990 he was part of the Genoa squad. This was followed by six seasons with Inter Milan, with 127 caps and 11 goals for the nerazzurri, where he won a UEFA Cup in 1994. He then left Inter in 1996 to join Bologna, where he played four seasons. He retired in 2001 after a season with Cagliari.

== International career ==
Fontolan was called up once for the Italian senior national team in 1993, but never appeared for Italy.

== Honours ==
Inter Milan

- UEFA Cup: 1991, 1994

Bologna

- UEFA Intertoto Cup: 1998

Individual

- Pirata d'Oro (Internazionale Player Of The Year): 1992
