= Ernesto Pellegrini =

Italian businessman (1940–2025)

- Pellegrini in 2015

Chairman of Inter Milan
- In office 1984–1995
- Preceded by: Ivanoe Fraizzoli
- Succeeded by: Massimo Moratti

Personal details
- Born: 14 December 1940 Milan, Italy
- Died: 31 May 2025 (aged 84) Milan, Italy
- Occupation: Businessman
- Known for: Chairman of Inter Milan

Ernesto Pellegrini (14 December 1940 – 31 May 2025) was an Italian businessman and the owner of Inter Milan from 1984 to 1995.

== Life and career ==
The son of a farmer, Pellegrini began working as an accountant in the early 1960s for the bicycle manufacturing company Bianchi, earning L50,000 per month. He was later promoted to chief accountant, but requested additional work within the company, eventually becoming the manager of the canteen.

This marked the beginning of his rise in the catering industry, and in 1965 he founded the Organizzazione Mense Pellegrini following the realisation that the Italian economic miracle was driving the expansion of the food industry, as rising disposable income and changing eating habits transformed consumer demand. In 1975, his company changed its status to Pellegrini S.p.A., which gradually expanded to offer a wide range of services in Italy, including meal vouchers, corporate, healthcare, and school catering, sanitation and industrial cleaning, and welfare support.

In 2019, Pellegrini S.p.A. made €600 million profit and employed circa 6,500 people.

Pellegrini died in Milan on 31 May 2025, at the age of 84, on the day of the Champions League final between Inter and PSG, which the Nerazzurri played wearing black armbands.

== Chairman of Inter Milan ==
In 1979, Pellegrini wrote a letter to the Inter's chairman Ivanoe Fraizzoli, asking to be allowed to contribute financially to the club. As a result, he was admitted as a member of the board. Pellegrini purchased Inter from Ivanoe Fraizzoli in 1984, becoming the club's 17th chairman.

Under Pelligrini's ownership, Inter purchased players such as Karl-Heinz Rummenigge, Lothar Matthäus, Jürgen Klinsmann, and Andreas Brehme, winning the record-breaking 1988–89 Serie A together with two UEFA Cups and one Supercoppa Italiana.

In 2020, he was inducted into Inter Milan Hall of Fame. In 2022, he was inducted into the Italian Football Hall of Fame.

== Orders ==
- Knight: Order of Merit for Labour: 1990
