= Wim Jonk =

Dutch footballer and manager

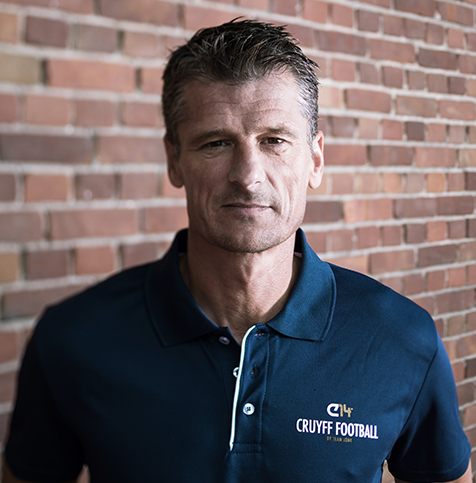
- Jonk in 2016

Personal information
- Full name: Wilhelmus Maria Jonk
- Date of birth: 12 October 1966 (age 60)
- Place of birth: Volendam, Netherlands
- Height: 1.87 m (6 ft 2 in)
- Position: Central midfielder

Team information
- Current team: Volendam (technical manager)

Senior career*
Years	Team	Apps	(Gls)
1986–1988	Volendam	59	(28)
1988–1993	Ajax	96	(18)
1993–1995	Inter Milan	54	(8)
1995–1998	PSV	89	(20)
1998–2001	Sheffield Wednesday	70	(3)
Total		368	(77)

International career
1992–1999	Netherlands	49	(11)

Managerial career
- 2011–2015: Ajax (head of academy)
- 2019–2023: Volendam
- 2023–: Volendam (technical manager)
- * Club domestic league appearances and goals

Wilhelmus Maria "Wim" Jonk (Dutch pronunciation: [ˈʋɪm ˈjɔŋk]; born 12 October 1966) is a Dutch professional football manager and former player, who is the current technical manager of Eredivisie club Volendam.

In his career as a midfielder, he won a variety of national honours with Ajax and PSV. Abroad, he won the UEFA Cup with Inter Milan in 1994, and played in the Premier League with Sheffield Wednesday.

A Dutch international with 49 caps between 1992 and 1999, he represented the team at UEFA Euro 1992 and the FIFA World Cups of 1994 and 1998, helping them come fourth at the latter.

== Club career ==
Born in Volendam, Jonk started his career in amateur club RKAV Volendam, before signing for Volendam in 1986. A prolific scorer from midfield, he helped his club achieve promotion to the Eredivisie in 1987. Ajax signed him in 1988.

At Ajax, he merged into the squad easily, scoring six goals in his debut season. He helped Ajax to the 1992 UEFA Cup Final, in which he scored to help them overcome Torino.

He signed for Inter Milan in 1993 on a three-year deal. He was joined by compatriot Dennis Bergkamp, who also joined from Ajax. He cost £3.3 million, and Bergkamp £7.1 million. He managed 54 appearances in two seasons and scored eight goals. He scored in a UEFA Cup Final again, this time as Inter won the 1994 final.

When Bergkamp left Inter for Arsenal at the end of the 1994–95 season, Jonk felt that his opportunities were limited as he neared the age of 30, and he went back to the Netherlands to sign with PSV.

For the 1998–99 season, Jonk went to join Sheffield Wednesday for a fee of £2.5 million, where he was a regular starter for the relegation-threatened side. He joined the team having been inspired by tales of the Premier League from his compatriots Jaap Stam and Arthur Numan. He was frequently injured, which caused the Wednesday fans to voice dissent about a clause in his contract which stipulated that he would automatically receive £7,500 per game, which he would miss through injury. He barely played in the 2000–01 season, the last of his contract, due to a groin injury, but he said in May 2001 that he wanted to return to playing.

== International career ==
Jonk made his debut for the Dutch national team as substitute, coming on in the 75th minute for Richard Witschge. The end result was a 3–2 win in a friendly match against Austria on 27 May 1992. Jonk was also selected in his debut year as an international for UEFA Euro 1992. In his only game, in the first group match against Scotland, Jonk came on for Jan Wouters in the 54th minute; they won the match 1-0.

At the 1994 FIFA World Cup in the United States, Jonk was part of Dick Advocaat's Dutch team. He scored the equaliser in a 2–1 group win over Saudi Arabia, and another long-range goal in a win against the Republic of Ireland in the last 16.

While at PSV, Jonk was selected by Guus Hiddink for the 1998 FIFA World Cup in France, after being overlooked for UEFA Euro 1996. He played five out of seven games as the team came fourth.

With the appointment of Frank Rijkaard as the new manager after the 1998 World Cup, Jonk played only once more for the Netherlands in a friendly against Denmark on 18 August 1999. He finished his international career on 49 caps and 11 goals.

== Managerial career ==
=== Head of Academy ===
After his career as a player, Jonk featured as a football pundit on NOS Studio Sport, before returning to his childhood club Volendam as the board member for technical affairs. In this role, Jonk also worked as an individual trainer and assistant to the first and second team of Volendam.

Between 2008 until November 2015, Jonk worked for Ajax. After ongoing disagreement between Jonk and Cruyff with the board of directors, about the interpretation and lack of implementation of the Plan Cruyff at the first team and in the overall club policy, Jonk left the club in December 2015, together with Cruyff and a large group of key academy personnel.

=== Cruyff Football ===
Jonk and Jordi Cruyff co-manage and lead the Amsterdam-based international football institute Cruyff Football, based on the Plan Cruyff and the legacy of Johan Cruyff.

=== Volendam ===
On 13 April 2019, Jonk was announced as the new manager of Eerste Divisie club Volendam. Three years later, he led the team to the top flight for the first time in 13 years. On 16 June 2023, Jonk was moved to the position of "technical manager of professional football" at the club, with his former assistant coach Matthias Kohler replacing him as head coach.

== Personal life ==
Jonk and his wife Gina have two children as of 2001. When he played for Sheffield Wednesday, they lived in Dore, South Yorkshire. Jonk is a Catholic; while many of his Dutch teammates were raised in the church, he was the only one of his contemporaries to make the sign of the cross while playing.

== Career statistics ==
=== International ===
Appearances and goals by national team and year
National team	Year	Apps	Goals
Netherlands	1992	6	1
Netherlands	1993	3	2
Netherlands	1994	15	4
Netherlands	1995	5	1
Netherlands	1996	4	2
Netherlands	1997	6	0
Netherlands	1998	9	1
Netherlands	1999	1	0
Total		49	11

Scores and results list Netherlands's goal tally first, score column indicates score after each Jonk goal.

List of international goals scored by Wim Jonk
No.	Date	Venue	Opponent	Score	Result	Competition	Ref.
1	30 May 1992	Stadion Galgenwaard, Utrecht, Netherlands	Wales	4–0	4–0	Friendly	
2	22 September 1993	Stadio Renato Dall'Ara, Bologna, Italy	San Marino	2–0	7–0	1994 FIFA World Cup qualification	
3	22 September 1993	Stadio Renato Dall'Ara, Bologna, Italy	San Marino	3–0	7–0	1994 FIFA World Cup qualification	
4	20 June 1994	RFK Stadium, Washington, D.C., United States	Saudi Arabia	1–1	2–1	1994 FIFA World Cup	
5	4 July 1994	Camping World Stadium, Orlando, United States	Republic of Ireland	2–0	2–0	1994 FIFA World Cup	
6	7 September 1994	Stade Josy Barthel, Luxembourg City, Luxembourg	Luxembourg	4–0	4–0	UEFA Euro 1996 qualifying	
7	14 December 1994	De Kuip, Rotterdam, Netherlands	Luxembourg	3–0	5–0	UEFA Euro 1996 qualifying	
8	26 April 1995	Letná Stadium, Prague, Czech Republic	Czech Republic	1–0	1–3	UEFA Euro 1996 qualifying	
9	9 November 1996	Philips Stadion, Eindhoven, Netherlands	Wales	3–0	7–1	1998 FIFA World Cup qualification	
10	14 December 1996	King Baudouin Stadium, Brussels, Belgium	Belgium	3–0	3–0	1998 FIFA World Cup qualification	
11	24 February 1998	Hard Rock Stadium, Miami Gardens, United States	Mexico	3–0	3–2	Friendly	

=== Managerial ===
As of match played on 5 February 2021

Managerial record by team and tenure
Team	From	To	Record							
Team	From	To	G	W	D	L	GF	GA	GD	Win %
Volendam	1 July 2019	Present	70	39	14	17	150	94	+56	55.71
Total			70	39	14	17	150	94	+56	55.71

== Honours ==
Ajax

- Eredivisie: 1989–90
- KNVB Cup: 1992–93
- UEFA Cup: 1991–92

Inter Milan

- UEFA Cup: 1993–94

PSV

- Eredivisie: 1996–97
- KNVB Cup: 1995–96
- Johan Cruijff Shield: 1996, 1997, 1998
