= 1991–92 Inter Milan season =

Inter Milan
1991–92 season
- Chairman: Ernesto Pellegrini
- Manager: Corrado Orrico (until 19 January 1992); Luis Suárez
- Serie A: 8th
- Coppa Italia: Quarter-finals
- UEFA Cup: First round
- Top goalscorer: League: Klinsmann (7); All: Klinsmann (8)
- Average home league attendance: 48,783
Home colours	Away colours	Third colours

The 1991–92 Inter Milan season was the club's 83rd in existence and 76th consecutive season in Serie A, the top flight of Italian football, in which they finished 8th. The club also competed in the 1991–92 Coppa Italia, and were eliminated in the quarter-finals, and the 1991–92 UEFA Cup, which they eliminated from in the first round.

== Season ==
When Trapattoni left Inter, in order to coach Juventus again, the club found his substitute in Corrado Orrico. Despite being UEFA Cup defending champions, the European title was lost. It was due to Boavista, who passed the round with a 2–1 aggregate (2–1 and 0–0 were the results). Midway through the league, due to the poor trend, Orrico was replaced by Luis Suárez. The Spanish, former Inter player, did not manage to improve the performances whilst Zenga saw his relationship with supporters deteriorate. Desideri, was also cut from the team after have mocking the coach (following a goal celebration). Drawing half of the total games (17 out of 34) Inter failed - for the first time since 1975 - a European placement, finishing only eighth.

== Squad ==
Note: Flags indicate national team as defined under FIFA eligibility rules; some limited exceptions apply. Players may hold more than one non-FIFA nationality.

Pos.	Nation	Player
GK	ITA	Walter Zenga
GK	ITA	Beniamino Abate
DF	ITA	Giuseppe Bergomi
DF	ITA	Giuseppe Baresi
DF	GER	Andreas Brehme
DF	ITA	Sergio Battistini
DF	ITA	Riccardo Ferri
DF	ITA	Antonio Paganin
DF	ITA	Marcello Montanari
DF	ITA	Marco Grossi
DF	ITA	Pasquale Rocco

Pos.	Nation	Player
MF	GER	Lothar Matthäus
MF	ITA	Alessandro Bianchi
MF	ITA	Nicola Berti
MF	ITA	Davide Fontolan
MF	ITA	Stefano Desideri
MF	ITA	Dino Baggio
MF	ITA	Fausto Pizzi
MF	ITA	Angelo Orlando
FW	GER	Jürgen Klinsmann
FW	ITA	Marco Delvecchio
FW	ITA	Massimo Ciocci

=== Transfers ===
In
Pos.	Name	from	Type
MF	Matthias Sammer	VfB Stuttgart	
MF	Dino Baggio	Torino	"loan"
GK	Beniamino Abate	Messina	
DF	Marcello Montanari	Lucchese	(6,300 million £)
DF	Pasquale Rocco	Cagliari	loan ended
DF	Stefano Rossini	Parma	loan ended
DF	Paolo Tramezzani	Cosenza	
MF	Stefano Desideri	AS Roma	
MF	Angelo Orlando	Udinese	(2,000 million £)
MF	Vincenzo Scifo	AJ Auxerre	
FW	Oliver Bierhoff	Casino Salzburg	
FW	Massimo Ciocci	Cesena	loan ended
FW	Raffaele Paolino	Cagliari	
FW	Nello Russo	Vimodronese	

Out
Pos.	Name	To	Type
FW	Aldo Serena	AC Milan	
MF	Vincenzo Scifo	Torino	(8,700 million £)
DF	Andrea Mandorlini	Udinese	
MF	Matthias Sammer	VfB Stuttgart	loan
FW	Oliver Bierhoff	Ascoli	loan
GK	Luca Mondini	Spezia	loan
GK	Paolo Orlandoni	Mantova	loan
DF	Stefano Bettarini	Baracca Lugo	loan
DF	Massimiliano Tacchinardi	Messina	loan
DF	Paolo Tramezzani	Lucchese	loan
MF	Pierluigi Di Già	Bologna	loan
MF	Cristiano Scapolo	Vicenza	co-ownership renewal
FW	Dario Morello	Reggiana	loan

==== Winter ====
In
Pos.	Name	from	Type

Out
Pos.	Name	To	Type
MF	Paolo Stringara	Avellino	
FW	Maurizio Iorio	Genoa	
DF	Pasquale Rocco	Venezia	loan
MF	Marco Barollo	Lecce	loan
FW	Raffaele Paolino	Venezia	loan

== Competitions ==
=== Serie A ===
==== League table ====
Pos	Team	Pld	W	D	L	GF	GA	GD	Pts	Qualification or relegation
6	Sampdoria	34	11	16	7	38	31	+7	38	
7	Parma	34	11	16	7	32	28	+4	38	Qualification to Cup Winners' Cup
8	Internazionale	34	10	17	7	28	28	0	37	
9	Foggia	34	12	11	11	58	58	0	35	
10	Lazio	34	11	12	11	43	40	+3	34	

Source: 1991–92 Serie A, RSSSF.com
Rules for classification: 1) Points; 2) Head-to-head points; 3) Head-to-head goal difference; 4) Goal difference; 5) Goals scored; 6) Draw.

==== Results by round ====
Round	1	2	3	4	5	6	7	8	9	10	11	12	13	14	15	16	17	18	19	20	21	22	23	24	25	26	27	28	29	30	31	32	33	34
Ground	H	A	H	A	H	A	A	H	A	H	A	H	H	A	H	A	H	A	H	A	H	A	H	H	A	H	A	H	A	A	H	A	H	A
Result	D	W	W	L	W	D	D	D	D	W	D	D	L	D	W	L	D	W	D	L	D	W	D	D	D	D	W	D	L	L	W	L	W	D
Position	7	3	1	4	2	2	3	3	4	3	4	4	4	4	4	8	8	4	4	6	6	6	6	6	6	5	5	5	5	6	5	8	8	8

Source: Competitive matches
A = Away; H = Home; W = Win; D = Draw; L = Loss; = 1992–93 European Cup; = 1992–93 UEFA Cup; = 1992–93 Serie B

==== Matches ====
1 September 1991 1	Inter	1–1	Foggia	Milan
	Ciocci 61'	Report	Baiano 52'	Stadium: Giuseppe Meazza

8 September 1991 2	Roma	0–1	Inter	Rome
		Report	Matthäus 85' (pen.)	Stadium: Olimpico

15 September 1991 3	Inter	2–0	Verona	Milan
	Desideri 45', 69' (pen.)	Report		Stadium: Giuseppe Meazza

22 September 1991 4	Sampdoria	4–0	Inter	Genoa
	Mancini 34'; Lombardo 57', 85'; Vialli 65'	Report		Stadium: Luigi Ferraris

29 September 1991 5	Lazio	0–1	Inter	Rome
		Report	Ferri 1'	Stadium: Olimpico

6 October 1991 6	Inter	1–1	Fiorentina	Milan
	Desideri 48'	Report	Fiondella 70'	Stadium: Giuseppe Meazza

20 October 1991 7	Cagliari	1–1	Inter	Cagliari
	Fonseca 29'	Report	D. Baggio 24'	Stadium: Sant'Elia

27 October 1991 8	Inter	0–0	Napoli	Milan
		Report		Stadium: Giuseppe Meazza

3 November 1991 9	Torino	0–0	Inter	Turin
		Report		Stadium: delle Alpi

17 November 1991 10	Inter	2–1	Ascoli	Milan
	Berti 47'; Ferri 52'	Report	Troglio 90'	Stadium: Giuseppe Meazza

24 November 1991 11	Parma	1–1	Inter	Parma
	Cuoghi 31'	Report	Fontolan 14'	Stadium: Ennio Tardini

1 December 1991 12	Inter	1–1	Milan	Milan
	Klinsmann 54'	Report	van Basten 18'	Stadium: Giuseppe Meazza

8 December 1991 13	Juventus	2–1	Inter	Turin
	R. Baggio 37' (pen.); Galia 83'	Report	Matthäus 89' (pen.)	Stadium: delle Alpi

15 December 1991 14	Inter	2–2	Genoa	Milan
	Brehme 16'; Pizzi 80'	Report	Carlos Aguilera 61'; Eranio 72'	Stadium: Giuseppe Meazza

12 January 1992 16	Inter	1–0	Bari	Milan
	Klinsmann 86'	Report		Stadium: Giuseppe Meazza

19 January 1992 17	Atalanta	1–0	Inter	Bergamo
	Bianchezi 29' (pen.)	Report		Stadium: Comunale

26 January 1992 18	Foggia	2–2	Inter	Foggia
	Baiano 83' (pen.); Petrescu 87'	Report	Matthäus 31' (pen.); Klinsmann 53'

29 January 1992 15	Cremonese	0–1	Inter	Cremona
		Report	Klinsmann 90'	Stadium: Giovanni Zini

2 February 1992 19	Inter	0–0	Roma	Milan
		Report		Stadium: Giuseppe Meazza

9 February 1992 20	Verona	1–0	Inter	Verona
	E. Rossi 23'	Report		Stadium: Marcantonio Bentegodi

16 February 1992 21	Inter	0–0	Sampdoria	Milan
		Report		Stadium: Giuseppe Meazza

23 February 1992 22	Inter	1–0	Lazio	Milan
	Matthäus 24' (pen.)	Report		Stadium: Giuseppe Meazza

1 March 1992 23	Fiorentina	1–1	Inter	Florence
	Iachini 57'	Report	Fontolan 29'	Stadium: Artemio Franchi

8 March 1992 24	Inter	0–0	Cagliari	Milan
		Report		Stadium: Giuseppe Meazza

15 March 1992 25	Napoli	1–1	Inter	Naples
	Zola 13'	Report	Desideri 52'	Stadium: San Paolo

28 March 1992 26	Inter	0–0	Torino	Milan
		Report		Stadium: Giuseppe Meazza

5 April 1992 27	Ascoli	1–2	Inter	Ascoli Piceno
	Bierhoff 12'	Report	Klinsmann 28', 78'	Stadium: Cino e Lillo Del Duca

12 April 1992 28	Inter	0–0	Parma	Milan
		Report		Stadium: Giuseppe Meazza

18 April 1992 29	Milan	1–0	Inter	Milan
	Massaro 89'	Report		Stadium: San Siro

26 April 1992 30	Inter	1–3	Juventus	Milan
	Fontolan 62'	Report	R. Baggio 30' (pen.), 37'; Schillaci 54'	Stadium: Giuseppe Meazza

3 May 1992 31	Genoa	1–2	Inter	Genoa
	Caricola 60'	Report	Pizzi 66' (pen.); Klinsmann 67'	Stadium: Luigi Ferraris

10 May 1992 32	Inter	0–2	Cremonese	Milan
		Report	Dezotti 63', 90' (pen.)	Stadium: Giuseppe Meazza

17 May 1992 33	Bari	0–2	Inter	Bari
		Report	Bianchi 45'; Pizzi 90'	Stadium: della Vittoria

24 May 1992 34	Inter	0–0	Atalanta	Milan
		Report		Stadium: Giuseppe Meazza

=== Coppa Italia ===
Second round

27 August 1991	Inter	1–0	Casertana	Cesena
	Petruzzi 25' (o.g.)			Stadium: Dino Manuzzi; Referee: Brignoccoli

3 September 1991	Casertana	2–2	Inter	Naples
	Esposito 75'; Serra 78'		48' D. Baggio; 65' Matthäus	Stadium: San Paolo; Referee: Fabricatore

Eightfinals

29 October 1991	Inter	2–2	Como	Milan
	Maiuri 44' (o.g.); Fadoni 45' (o.g.)		68' Pedone; 79' Mazzoleni	Stadium: Giuseppe Meazza; Referee: Quartuccio

5 November 1991	Como	1–2	Inter	Como
	Mirabelli 86' (pen.)		5' Berti; 72' Klinsmann	Stadium: Stadio Giuseppe Sinigaglia; Referee: Sguizzato

Quarterfinals

11 February 1992	Juventus	1–0	Inter	Turin
	Di Canio 47'			Stadium: delle Alpi; Referee: Amendolia

27 February 1992	Inter	1–2 (a.e.t.) (1–3 agg.)	Juventus	Milan
	Ciocci 79'		99' Baggio; 120' Baggio	Stadium: Giuseppe Meazza; Referee: Lanese

=== UEFA Cup ===
Round of 32

18 September 1991	(Portugal) Boavista	2–1	Inter	Porto
	Brandão 38'; Barny 57'		67' Fontolan	Stadium: Stadio do Bessa; Referee: (Hungary) Nemeth

2 October 1991	Inter	0–0 (1–2 agg.)	(Portugal) Boavista	Milan
				Stadium: Giuseppe Meazza; Referee: (England) Gunn

== Statistics ==
=== Players statistics ===
No.	Pos	Nat	Player	Total		Serie A		Coppa		UEFA	
No.	Pos	Nat	Player	Apps	Goals	Apps	Goals	Apps	Goals	Apps	Goals
	GK	(Italy) ITA	Walter Zenga	39	-37	31	−27	6	−8	2	−2
	DF	(Italy) ITA	Giuseppe Bergomi	37	0	29	0	6	0	2	0
	DF	(Italy) ITA	Riccardo Ferri	33	2	29	2	2	0	2	0
	DF	(Germany) GER	Lothar Matthäus	34	5	27	4	5	1	2	0
	DF	(Germany) GER	Andreas Brehme	35	1	30	1	4	0	1	0
	MF	(Italy) ITA	Alessandro Bianchi	31	1	26	1	3	0	2	0
	MF	(Italy) ITA	Stefano Desideri	35	4	22+7	4	4	0	2	0
	MF	(Italy) ITA	Dino Baggio	34	2	25+2	1	5	1	2	0
	MF	(Italy) ITA	Nicola Berti	37	2	29+1	1	5	1	2	0
	FW	(Germany) GER	Jürgen Klinsmann	37	8	31	7	5	1	1	0
	FW	(Italy) ITA	Davide Fontolan	37	4	23+6	3	6	0	2	1
	GK	(Italy) ITA	Beniamino Abate	4	-1	3	−1	1	0	0	0
	DF	(Italy) ITA	Sergio Battistini	26	0	19+1	0	5	0	1	0
	DF	(Italy) ITA	Antonio Paganin	18	0	15	0	2	0	1	0
	MF	(Italy) ITA	Angelo Orlando	18	0	10+6	0	2	0	0	0
	FW	(Italy) ITA	Massimo Ciocci	35	2	9+19	1	5	1	2	0
	DF	(Italy) ITA	Marcello Montanari	16	0	9+2	0	4	0	1	0
	MF	(Italy) ITA	Fausto Pizzi	17	3	4+8	3	4	0	1	0
	FW	(Italy) ITA	Marco Delvecchio	5	0	2+2	0	1	0	0	0
	DF	(Italy) ITA	Giuseppe Baresi	8	0	1+5	0	2	0	0	0
	DF	(Italy) ITA	Marco Grossi	2	0	0+1	0	1	0	0	0
	GK	(Italy) ITA	Davide Cecotti	1	0	0+1	0	0	0		
	MF	(Italy) ITA	Pasquale Rocco	0	0	0	0				
	GK	(Italy) ITA	Raffaele Nuzzo	0	0	0	0				
	FW	(Italy) ITA	Dario Passoni	1	0	0	0	1	0		

- Source: http://calcio-seriea.net/presenze/1991/1024/

== Sources ==
- RSSSF - Italy 1991/92
