= 1992–93 Inter Milan season =

Inter Milan
1992–93 season
- President: Ernesto Pellegrini
- Manager: Osvaldo Bagnoli
- Stadium: Giuseppe Meazza
- Serie A: Runners-up (in 1993-94 UEFA Cup)
- Coppa Italia: Quarter-finals
- Top goalscorer: League: Rubén Sosa (20); All: Rubén Sosa (22)
Home colours	Away colours	Third colours

Inter Milan returned to the top echelon of the domestic scene, finishing second to city rivals A.C. Milan in the championship. The relatively narrow four-points margin between the two sides, was explained by Milan drawing several matches when it had already clinched the title, so the result was a lot closer than it was during the course of the season.

Following the indifferent 1991–92 season, Inter sold all of its three German internationals Andreas Brehme, Lothar Matthäus and Jürgen Klinsmann back to Bundesliga. That enabled Inter to purchase several foreign players, and especially playmaker Igor Shalimov and topscorer Rubén Sosa proved vital in Inter's resurgence. Strikers Darko Pančev and Salvatore Schillaci struggled to live up to expectations, which made Sosa's 20 league goals vital.

== Squad ==
Note: Flags indicate national team as defined under FIFA eligibility rules; some limited exceptions apply. Players may hold more than one non-FIFA nationality.

Pos.	Nation	Player
GK	ITA	Walter Zenga
GK	ITA	Beniamino Abate
DF	ITA	Giuseppe Bergomi
DF	ITA	Sergio Battistini
DF	ITA	Riccardo Ferri
DF	ITA	Paolo Tramezzani
DF	ITA	Luigi De Agostini
DF	ITA	Antonio Paganin
DF	ITA	Stefano Rossini
DF	ITA	Mirko Taccola
DF	ITA	Marcello Montanari

Pos.	Nation	Player
MF	GER	Matthias Sammer
MF	ITA	Angelo Orlando
MF	ITA	Alessandro Bianchi
MF	ITA	Nicola Berti
MF	ITA	Antonio Manicone
MF	ITA	Davide Fontolan
MF	RUS	Igor Shalimov
MF	ITA	Stefano Desideri
FW	URU	Rubén Sosa
FW	ITA	Salvatore Schillaci
FW	MKD	Darko Pančev

=== Transfers ===
In
Pos.	Name	from	Type
FW	Darko Pančev	Crvena Zvezda	
MF	Matthias Sammer	VfB Stuttgart	loan ended
MF	Igor Shalimov	Foggia	
FW	Rubén Sosa	Lazio	
FW	Salvatore Schillaci	Juventus	
DF	Luigi De Agostini	Juventus	
DF	Stefano Rossini	Udinese	loan ended
DF	Massi Tacchinardi	Messina	loan ended
MF	Pierluigi Di Già	Bologna	loan ended
MF	Giuseppe Marino	Taranto	loan ended

Out
Pos.	Name	To	Type
MF	Lothar Matthäus	Bayern Munich	
FW	Jürgen Klinsmann	Monaco	
DF	Andreas Brehme	Real Zaragoza	
DF	Giuseppe Baresi	Modena	
MF	Dino Baggio	Juventus	loan ended
DF	Massi Tacchinardi	Pro Sesto	loan
MF	Pierluigi Di Già	Venezia	loan
MF	Fausto Pizzi	Parma	
FW	Dario Morello	Reggiana	co-ownership

==== Winter ====
In
Pos.	Name	from	Type
MF	Antonio Manicone	Udinese	

Out
Pos.	Name	To	Type
MF	Matthias Sammer	Borussia Dortmund	
DF	Marcello Montanari	Bari	co-ownership
MF	Stefano Desideri	Udinese	
MF	Giuseppe Marino	Taranto	
FW	Alessandro Montalto	Palazzolo	

== Competitions ==
=== Serie A ===
==== League table ====
Pos	Team	Pld	W	D	L	GF	GA	GD	Pts	Qualification or relegation
1	Milan (C)	34	18	14	2	65	32	+33	50	Qualification to European Cup
2	Internazionale	34	17	12	5	59	36	+23	46	Qualification to UEFA Cup
3	Parma (Note: Parma qualified to 1993–94 UEFA Cup Winners' Cup as defending champions.)	34	16	9	9	47	34	+13	41	Qualification to Cup Winners' Cup
4	Juventus	34	15	9	10	59	47	+12	39	Qualification to UEFA Cup
5	Lazio	34	13	12	9	65	51	+14	38	Qualification to UEFA Cup

Source: 1992–93 Serie A, RSSSF.com
Rules for classification: 1) Points; 2) Head-to-head points; 3) Head-to-head goal difference; 4) Goal difference; 5) Goals scored; 6) Draw.(Note:
(C) Champions

==== Results by round ====
Round	1	2	3	4	5	6	7	8	9	10	11	12	13	14	15	16	17	18	19	20	21	22	23	24	25	26	27	28	29	30	31	32	33	34
Ground	A	H	A	H	H	A	H	A	H	A	H	A	A	H	A	H	A	H	A	H	A	A	H	A	H	A	H	A	H	H	A	H	A	H
Result	L	W	W	D	W	L	W	W	D	D	W	L	L	W	W	W	W	D	D	D	D	D	D	W	W	W	D	W	W	W	D	D	L	W
Position	14	6	4	3	2	5	3	2	3	3	2	2	2	2	2	2	2	2	2	2	2	2	2	2	2	2	2	2	2	2	2	2	2	2

Source: Competitive matches
A = Away; H = Home; W = Win; D = Draw; L = Loss; = Leader, 1993–94 UEFA Champions League; = 1993–94 UEFA Cup; = 1993–94 Serie B

==== Matches ====
6 September 1992 1	Udinese	2–1	Inter Milan	Udine
15:00 CEST	Balbo 70'; Rossitto 86'	Report	Schillaci 76'	Stadium: Friuli; Referee: Beschin

13 September 1992 2	Inter Milan	3–1	Cagliari	Milan
15:00 CEST	Bianchi 7'; Bergomi 16'; Shalimov 90'	Report	Luís Oliveira 53'	Stadium: Giuseppe Meazza; Referee: Felicani

20 September 1992 3	Napoli	1–2	Inter Milan	Naples
15:00 CEST	Fonseca 84'	Report	Sammer 54'; Schillaci 57'	Stadium: San Paolo; Referee: Stafoggia

27 September 1992 4	Inter Milan	2–2	Fiorentina	Milan
15:00 CEST	Shalimov 80'; Battistini 87'	Report	Batistuta 53', 83'	Stadium: Giuseppe Meazza; Referee: Pairetto

4 October 1992 5	Inter Milan	1–0	Atalanta	Milan
15:00 CEST	Sosa 78' (pen.)	Report		Stadium: Giuseppe Meazza; Referee: Fabricatore

18 October 1992 6	Roma	4–1	Inter Milan	Rome
15:00 CEST	Benedetti 39'; Häßler 46'; Giannini 51'; Rizzitelli 65'	Report	Sammer 43'	Stadium: Olimpico; Referee: Pairetto

25 October 1992 7	Inter Milan	3–1	Juventus	Milan
15:00 CEST	Sosa 38'; Sammer 41'; Shalimov 80'	Report	Möller 85'	Stadium: Giuseppe Meazza; Referee: Amendiola

1 November 1992 8	Pescara	1–4	Inter Milan	Pescara
15:00 CEST	Massara 62'	Report	Shalimov 55'; Battistini 72'; Desideri 76'; Sammer 90'	Stadium: Adriatico; Referee: Luci

8 November 1992 9	Inter Milan	0–0	Sampdoria	Milan
15:00 CEST		Report		Stadium: Giuseppe Meazza; Referee: Sguizzato

22 November 1992 10	Milan	1–1	Inter Milan	Milan
15:00 CEST	Lentini 40'	Report	De Agostini 74'	Stadium: San Siro; Referee: Pezzella

29 November 1992 11	Inter Milan	2–1	Brescia	Milan
15:00 CEST	Berti 23'; Battistini 90'	Report	Giunta 33'	Stadium: Giuseppe Meazza; Referee: Rodomonti

6 December 1992 12	Ancona	3–0	Inter Milan	Ancona
15:00 CEST	Détári 20', 75'; Lupo 83'	Report		Stadium: Stadio del Conero; Referee: Bettin

13 December 1992 13	Lazio	3–1	Inter Milan	Rome
15:00 CEST	Fuser 60'; Winter 73'; Signori 84'	Report	Fontolan 76'	Stadium: Olimpico; Referee: Cesari

3 January 1993 14	Inter Milan	4–0	Genoa	Milan
15:00 CEST	Battistini 4'; Sosa 48'; Ferri 64'; Shalimov 83'	Report		Stadium: Giuseppe Meazza; Referee: Mughetti

10 January 1993 15	Foggia	1–3	Inter Milan	Foggia
15:00 CEST	Di Biagio 82'	Report	Shalimov 20', 72'; Sosa 70'	Stadium: Pino Zaccheria; Referee: Trentalange

17 January 1993 16	Inter Milan	2–1	Parma	Milan
15:00 CEST	Sosa 60'; Berti 72'	Report	Melli 21'	Stadium: Giuseppe Meazza; Referee: Cinciripini

24 January 1993 17	Torino	1–2	Inter Milan	Turin
15:00 CEST	A. Paganin 67' (o.g.)	Report	Sosa 61' (pen.); Fontolan 62'	Stadium: delle Alpi; Referee: Pezzella

31 January 1993 18	Inter Milan	2–2	Udinese	Milan
15:00 CET	Pančev 7'; Sosa 38' (pen.)	Report	65' Desideri; 85' Balbo	Stadium: Giuseppe Meazza; Referee: Collina

7 February 1993 19	Cagliari	0–0	Inter Milan	Cagliari
15:00 CET		Report		Stadium: Sant'Elia; Referee: Sguizzato

14 February 1993 20	Inter Milan	0–0	Napoli	Milan
15:00 CET		Report		Stadium: Giuseppe Meazza; Referee: Trentalange

28 February 1993 21	Fiorentina	2–2	Inter Milan	Florence
15:00 CET	Batistuta 7'; A. Paganin 90' (o.g.)	Report	Sosa 13', 70'	Stadium: Artemio Franchi; Referee: Baldas

7 March 1993 22	Atalanta	1–1	Inter Milan	Bergamo
15:00 CET	Bergomi 65' (o.g.)	Report	Manicone 69'	Stadium: Comunale; Referee: Beschin

14 March 1993 23	Inter Milan	1–1	Roma	Milan
15:00 CET	Battistini 44'	Report	Caniggia 66'	Stadium: Giuseppe Meazza; Referee: Ceccarini

21 March 1993 24	Juventus	0–2	Inter Milan	Turin
15:00 CET		Report	Sosa 16'; Shalimov 20'	Stadium: delle Alpi; Referee: Collina

28 March 1993 25	Inter Milan	2–0	Pescara	Milan
15:00 CET	Sosa 31', 82'	Report		Stadium: Giuseppe Meazza; Referee: Braschi

4 April 1993 26	Sampdoria	1–3	Inter Milan	Genoa
15:00 CEST	Jugović 75'	Report	Schillaci 2', 20'; Berti 68'	Stadium: Luigi Ferraris; Referee: Mughetti

10 April 1993 27	Inter Milan	1–1	Milan	Milan
15:00 CEST	Berti 44'	Report	Gullit 84'	Stadium: Giuseppe Meazza; Referee: Pairetto

18 April 1993 28	Brescia	1–3	Inter Milan	Brescia
15:00 CEST	Săbau 53'	Report	Sosa 56', 60'; Schillaci 81'	Stadium: Mario Rigamonti; Referee: Ceccarini

25 April 1993 29	Inter Milan	3–0	Ancona	Milan
15:00 CEST	Bergomi 8'; Sosa 27', 56'	Report		Stadium: Giuseppe Meazza; Referee: Quartuccio

8 May 1993 30	Inter Milan	2–0	Lazio	Milan
15:00 CEST	Bacci 2' (o.g.); Schillaci 84'	Report		Stadium: Giuseppe Meazza; Referee: Cesari

16 May 1993 31	Genoa	1–1	Inter Milan	Genoa
15:00 CEST	Panucci 27'	Report	Sosa 53'	Stadium: Luigi Ferraris; Referee: Brignoccoli

23 May 1993 32	Inter Milan	1–1	Foggia	Milan
15:00 CEST	Sosa 27'	Report	Roy 88'	Stadium: Giuseppe Meazza; Referee: Brignoccoli

30 May 1993 33	Parma	2–0	Inter Milan	Parma
15:00 CEST	Melli 15'; Cuoghi 81'	Report		Stadium: Ennio Tardini; Referee: Cinciripini

6 June 1993 34	Inter Milan	3–0	Torino	Milan
15:00 CEST	Sosa 49', 64'; Shalimov 51'	Report		Stadium: Giuseppe Meazza; Referee: Nicchi

=== Coppa Italia ===
Second round

26 August 1992	Reggiana	3–4	Inter Milan	Reggio Emilia
20:45 CET	Sgarbossa 10'; Pacione 45'; De Falco 90'		15', 23', 49' Pančev; 30' Sosa	Stadium: Stadio Giglio; Referee: Cinciripini

2 September 1992	Inter Milan	4–2 (8–5 agg.)	Reggiana	Milan
20:45 CET	Pančev 6', 25'; Schillaci 60'; Bianchi 90'		34' Francesconi; 68' (pen.) Sacchetti	Stadium: Giuseppe Meazza; Referee: Bazzoli

Round of 16

6 October 1992	Foggia	0–0	Inter Milan	Foggia
20:45 CET				Stadium: Stadio Pino Zaccheria; Referee: Mughetti

28 October 1992	Inter Milan	2–0 (2–0 agg.)	Foggia	Milan
20:45 CET	Sosa 38'; Desideri 49'			Stadium: Stadio Giuseppe Meazza; Referee: Pezzella

Quarter-finals

27 January 1993	Milan	0–0	Inter Milan	Milan
20:45 CET				Stadium: San Siro; Referee: Beschin

10 February 1993	Inter Milan	0–3 (0–3 agg.)	Milan	Milan
20:45 CET			5', 12' Papin; 35' Gullit	Stadium: Giuseppe Meazza; Referee: Baldas

== Statistics ==
=== Players Statistics ===
No.	Pos	Nat	Player	Total		Serie A		Coppa	
No.	Pos	Nat	Player	Apps	Goals	Apps	Goals	Apps	Goals
	GK	(Italy) ITA	Walter Zenga	34	-34	29	-26	5	-8
	DF	(Italy) ITA	Giuseppe Bergomi	37	2	31	2	6	0
	DF	(Italy) ITA	Riccardo Ferri	26	1	20	1	6	0
	DF	(Italy) ITA	Sergio Battistini	40	5	34	5	6	0
	DF	(Italy) ITA	Luigi De Agostini	36	1	31	1	5	0
	MF	(Russia) RUS	Igor Shalimov	37	9	32	9	5	0
	MF	(Italy) ITA	Antonio Manicone	22	1	20	1	2	0
	MF	(Italy) ITA	Davide Fontolan	30	2	16+9	2	5	0
	MF	(Italy) ITA	Nicola Berti	38	4	32	4	6	0
	FW	(Uruguay) URU	Rubén Sosa	33	22	28	20	5	2
	FW	(Italy) ITA	Salvatore Schillaci	23	7	20+1	6	2	1
	GK	(Italy) ITA	Beniamino Abate	8	-10	5+2	-10	1	-0
	MF	(Italy) ITA	Alessandro Bianchi	22	2	17	1	5	1
	MF	(Italy) ITA	Antonio Paganin	27	0	16+9	0	2	0
	MF	(Italy) ITA	Angelo Orlando	23	0	15+4	0	4	0
	MF	(Germany) GER	Matthias Sammer	12	4	11	4	1	0
	FW	(North Macedonia) MKD	Darko Pančev	16	6	9+3	1	4	5
	DF	(Italy) ITA	Mirko Taccola	6	0	6	0	0	0
	DF	(Italy) ITA	Paolo Tramezzani	15	0	4+9	0	2	0
	MF	(Italy) ITA	Stefano Desideri	5	2	2+2	1	1	1
	DF	(Italy) ITA	Marcello Montanari	4	0	1	0	3	0
	DF	(Italy) ITA	Stefano Rossini	4	0	0+3	0	1	0
	DF	(Italy) ITA	Simone Veronese	1	0	0+1	0	0	0
	GK	(Italy) ITA	Marco Fortin	0	0	0	0	0	0
	FW	(Italy) ITA	Arturo Di Napoli	0	0	0	0	0	0
	MF	(Italy) ITA	Stefano Vecchi	0	0	0	0	0	0

- Source: http://calcio-seriea.net/presenze/1992/1051/

== Sources ==
- RSSSF - Italy 1992/93
