= 1990–91 Inter Milan season =

Inter Milan
1990–91 season
- President: Ernesto Pellegrini
- Manager: Giovanni Trapattoni
- Stadium: Giuseppe Meazza
- Serie A: 3rd
- Coppa Italia: Quarter-finals
- UEFA Cup: Winners (In 1991–92 UEFA Cup)
- Top goalscorer: League: Matthäus (16); All: Matthäus (23)
- Average home league attendance: 54,946
Home colours	Away colours

The 1990–91 Inter Milan season was the club's 82nd in existence and 75th consecutive season in Serie A, the top flight of Italian football, in which they finished 3rd. The club also competed in the 1990–91 Coppa Italia – which they were eliminated from in the quarter-finals – and the 1990–91 UEFA Cup, which they won, having beat fellow Serie A club AS Roma 2–1 in the final.

== Season summary ==
Inter was thought to be a favourite for the Serie A title, having - between others - three world champions in their squad. Well placed in the league, the side also reached the quarter-finals of the UEFA Cup after comebacks against Rapid Wien and Aston Villa. Trapattoni's team managed to progress to the final, beating also Atalanta and Sporting Lisbon. Lost hopes for the Scudetto, due to losses from the Genoa sides in May, Inter saved the season by winning the UEFA cup. The triumph was over fellow Italian side Roma, 2–1 on aggregate.

== Squad ==
Note: Flags indicate national team as defined under FIFA eligibility rules; some limited exceptions apply. Players may hold more than one non-FIFA nationality.

Pos.	Nation	Player
GK	ITA	Walter Zenga
GK	ITA	Astutillo Malgioglio
GK	ITA	Luciano Bodini
DF	ITA	Giuseppe Bergomi
DF	GER	Andreas Brehme
DF	ITA	Sergio Battistini
DF	ITA	Riccardo Ferri
DF	ITA	Antonio Paganin
DF	ITA	Giuseppe Baresi (Captain)
DF	ITA	Massimiliano Tacchinardi
DF	ITA	Stefano Bettarini

Pos.	Nation	Player
MF	GER	Lothar Matthäus
MF	ITA	Alessandro Bianchi
MF	ITA	Nicola Berti
MF	ITA	Davide Fontolan
MF	ITA	Fausto Pizzi
MF	ITA	Paolo Stringara
MF	ITA	Andrea Mandorlini
FW	ITA	Aldo Serena
FW	ITA	Maurizio Iorio
FW	GER	Jürgen Klinsmann

=== Transfers ===
In
Pos.	Name	from	Type
GK	Luciano Bodini	Hellas Verona	
DF	Sergio Battistini	Fiorentina	
DF	Antonio Paganin	Udinese	
DF	Paolo Tramezzani	Prato	loan ended
MF	Davide Fontolan	Genoa	
MF	Giuseppe Marino	Vicenza	
MF	Fausto Pizzi	Parma	
MF	Paolo Stringara	Bologna	
MF	Fabio Tricarico	Castel di Sangro	loan ended
FW	Massimo Ciocci	Ancona	

Out
Pos.	Name	To	Type
GK	Luca Mondini	Spezia	loan
DF	Pasquale Domenico	Rocco Cagliari	loan
DF	Stefano Rossini	Fiorentina	co-ownership
DF	Paolo Tramezzani	Cosenza	co-ownership
DF	Corrado Verdelli	Cremonese	
MF	Enrico Cucchi	AS Bari	
MF	Pasquale De Vincenzo	Catanzaro	
MF	Pierluigi Di Già	Bologna	loan
MF	Gianfranco Matteoli	Cagliari	
MF	Vincenzo Scifo	AJ Auxerre	co-ownership
MF	Fabio Tricarico	Breno	
FW	Massimo Ciocci	Cesena	loan
FW	Dario Morello	Reggiana	loan

==== Winter ====
In
Pos.	Name	from	Type
FW	Maurizio Iorio	Hellas Verona	loan

Out
Pos.	Name	to	Type

== Competitions ==
=== Serie A ===
==== League table ====
Pos	Team	Pld	W	D	L	GF	GA	GD	Pts	Qualification or relegation
1	Sampdoria (C)	34	20	11	3	57	24	+33	51	Qualification to European Cup
2	Milan (Note: In March 1991, UEFA banned Milan from participating in European competition for one season due to refusing to resume their 1990-91 European Cup quarterfinal match away versus Olympique Marseille. The ban went into effect for the 1991–92 UEFA Cup.)	34	18	10	6	46	19	+27	46	Banned from European competition
3	Internazionale	34	18	10	6	56	31	+25	46	Qualification to UEFA Cup
4	Genoa	34	14	12	8	51	36	+15	40	Qualification to UEFA Cup
5	Torino	34	12	14	8	40	29	+11	38	Qualification to UEFA Cup

Source: 1990–91 Serie A, RSSSF.com
Rules for classification: 1) Points; 2) Head-to-head points; 3) Head-to-head goal difference; 4) Goal difference; 5) Goals scored; 6) Draw.
(C) Champions

==== Results by round ====
Round	1	2	3	4	5	6	7	8	9	10	11	12	13	14	15	16	17	18	19	20	21	22	23	24	25	26	27	28	29	30	31	32	33	34
Ground	A	H	A	H	H	A	H	A	H	A	H	H	A	A	H	A	A	H	A	H	A	A	H	A	H	A	H	A	H	A	H	H	A	H
Result	W	W	L	W	D	W	L	W	W	W	D	W	D	L	W	D	W	D	D	W	D	W	W	W	D	L	D	W	W	D	L	L	W	W
Position	2	2	6	2	2	2	4	4	3	2	3	1	1	2	1	2	1	1	1	1	2	2	1	1	2	2	2	2	2	2	3	3	3	3

Source: Competitive matches
A = Away; H = Home; W = Win; D = Draw; L = Loss; = 1991–92 European Cup; = 1991–92 UEFA Cup

==== Matches ====
9 September 1990 1	Cagliari	0–3	Inter	Cagliari
15:00 CEST		Report	Klinsmann 58'; Klinsmann 65'; Klinsmann 75'	Stadium: Sant Elia

16 September 1990 2	Inter	1–0	Bologna	Milan
15:00 CEST	Bianchi 90'	Report		Stadium: Giuseppe Meazza

23 September 1990 3	Torino	2–0	Inter	Turin
15:00 CEST	Vázquez 51'; Lentini 79'	Report		Stadium: delle Alpi

30 September 1990 4	Inter	2–1	Roma	Milan
15:00 CEST	Klinsmann 76'; Pizzi 88'	Report	Carnevale 30'	Stadium: Giuseppe Meazza

7 October 1990 5	Atalanta	1–1	Inter	Bergamo
15:00 CEST	Evair 50'	Report	Matthäus 90' (pen.)	Stadium: Comunale

21 October 1990 6	Inter	6–3	Pisa	Milan
15:00 CEST	Serena 4', 43', 88'; Bergomi 27'; Matthäus 55' (pen.), 65'	Report	Piovanelli 48', 64'; Stringara 61' (o.g.)	Stadium: Giuseppe Meazza

28 October 1990 7	Juventus	4–2	Inter	Turin
15:00 CET	Baggio 2' (pen.); Casiraghi 15'; Schillaci 57'; De Agostini 64'	Report	Matthäus 34'; Klinsmann 80'	Stadium: delle Alpi

11 November 1990 8	Inter	2–1	Parma	Milan
15:00 CET	Serena 35'; Matthäus 37' (pen.)	Report	Melli 89'	Stadium: Giuseppe Meazza

18 November 1990 9	Milan	0–1	Inter	Milan
15:00 CET		Report	Berti 85'	Stadium: San Siro

25 November 1990 10	Inter	2–1	Napoli	Milan
15:00 CET	Matthäus 52'; Baroni 65' (o.g.)	Report	Careca 53'	Stadium: Giuseppe Meazza

2 December 1990 11	Bari	1–1	Inter	Bari
15:00 CET	Maccoppi 31'	Report	Serena 35'	Stadium: delle Vittoria

9 December 1990 12	Cesena	1–5	Inter	Cesena
15:00 CET	Ciocci 20' (pen.)	Report	Klinsmann 5'; Matthäus 51'; Serena 56'; Pizzi 79'; Barcella 90' (o.g.)	Stadium: Dino Manuzzi

16 December 1990 13	Inter	1–1	Fiorentina	Milan
15:00 CET	Matthäus 49' (pen.)	Report	Fuser 30'	Stadium: Giuseppe Meazza

30 December 1990 14	Sampdoria	3–1	Inter	Genoa
15:00 CET	Vialli 1', 82' (pen.); Mancini 86'	Report	Berti 50'	Stadium: Luigi Ferraris

6 January 1991 15	Inter	2–1	Genoa	Milan
15:00 CET	Matthäus 16' (pen.); Klinsmann 53'	Report	Eranio 72'	Stadium: Giuseppe Meazza

13 January 1991 16	Lazio	0–0	Inter	Rome
15:00 CET		Report		Stadium: Olimpico

20 January 1991 17	Inter	5–0	Lecce	Milan
15:00 CET	Brehme 2'; Matthäus 42', 47' (pen.); Pizzi 80'; Klinsmann 90'	Report		Stadium: Giuseppe Meazza

27 January 1991 18	Inter	1–1	Cagliari	Milan
15:00 CET	Klinsmann 44'	Report	Cappioli 87'	Stadium: Giuseppe Meazza

3 February 1991 19	Bologna	0–0	Inter	Bologna
15:00 CET		Report		Stadium: Renato Dall'Ara

10 February 1991 20	Inter	1–0	Torino	Milan
15:00 CET	Klinsmann 8'	Report		Stadium: Giuseppe Meazza

17 February 1991 21	Roma	1–1	Inter	Rome
15:00 CET	Rizzitelli 81'	Report	Berti 67'	Stadium: Olimpico

24 February 1991 22	Inter	3–1	Atalanta	Milan
15:00 CET	Stringara 42'; Klinsmann 55', 81'	Report	Strömberg 24'	Stadium: Giuseppe Meazza

3 March 1991 23	Pisa	0–1	Inter	Pisa
15:00 CET		Report	Berti 51'	Stadium: Arena Garibaldi

10 March 1991 24	Inter	2–0	Juventus	Milan
15:00 CET	Matthäus 36'; Battistini 49'	Report		Stadium: Giuseppe Meazza

17 March 1991 25	Parma	0–0	Inter	Parma
15:00 CET		Report		Stadium: Ennio Tardini

24 March 1991 26	Inter	0–1	Milan	Milan
15:00 CEST		Report	van Basten 74'	Stadium: Giuseppe Meazza

30 March 1991 27	Napoli	1–1	Inter	Naples
15:00 CEST	Careca 71'	Report	Matthäus 70'	Stadium: San Paolo

6 April 1991 28	Inter	5–1	Bari	Milan
15:00 CEST	Matthäus 42' (pen.); Serena 75', 78'; Bianchi 83'; Klinsmann 90'	Report	Răducioiu 88'	Stadium: Giuseppe Meazza

14 April 1991 29	Inter	2–0	Cesena	Milan
15:00 CEST	Bergomi 28'; Matthäus 80'	Report		Stadium: Giuseppe Meazza

20 April 1991 30	Fiorentina	0–0	Inter	Florence
15:00 CEST		Report		Stadium: Comunale

4 May 1991 31	Inter	0–2	Sampdoria	Milan
15:00 CEST	Bergomi (red card) 45'; Matthaüs (penalty missed) 67'	Report	45' (red card) Mancini; 60' Dossena; 76' Vialli	Stadium: Giuseppe Meazza
Note: Gianluca Pagliuca blocked a penalty shoot-out by Matthäus at 67'.

12 May 1991 32	Genoa	3–0	Inter	Genoa
15:00 CEST	Ruotolo 38'; Skuhravý 76'; Carlos Aguilera 89' (pen.)	Report		Stadium: Luigi Ferraris

18 May 1991 33	Inter	2–0	Lazio	Milan
15:00 CEST	Battistini 58'; Klinsmann 82'	Report		Stadium: Giuseppe Meazza

26 May 1991 34	Lecce	0–2	Inter	Lecce
15:00 CEST		Report	Bergomi 72'; Matthäus 90'	Stadium: Via del Mare

=== Coppa Italia ===
Round of 16

5 September 1990	Monza	0–1	Inter	Monza
			Brehme 81' (pen.)	Stadium: Brianteo

13 September 1990	Inter	2–1	Monza	Monza
	Battistini 34'; Berti 52'		65' Di Biagio	Stadium: Stadio Brianteo

Eightfinals

9 January 1991	Inter	2–1	Torino	Milan
	Matthäus 82'; Bergomi 88'		3' Martín Vázquez	Stadium: Giuseppe Meazza

23 January 1991	Torino	1–0 (2a-2 agg.)	Inter	Turin
	Lentini 15'			Stadium: delle Alpi

=== UEFA Cup ===
==== Round of 32 ====
19 September 1990	Rapid Wien (Austria)	2–1	(Italy) Inter	Wien
19:30 (CET)	Pfeifenberger 55'; Keglevits 71'	Report	5' Matthäus	Stadium: Gerhard Hanappi Stadion; Referee: (France) Quiniou

3 October 1990	Inter (Italy)	3–1	(Austria) Rapid Wien	Verona
20:30 (CET)	Berti 67', 84'; Klinsmann 101'	Report	88' Weber	Stadium: Marcantonio Bentegodi; Referee: (England) Courtney

==== Round of 16 ====
24 October 1990	Aston Villa (England)	2–0	(Italy) Inter	Birmingham
21:00 (CET)	Nielsen 14'; Platt 68'	Report		Stadium: Villa Park; Referee: (Hungary) Nemeth

7 November 1990	Inter (Italy)	3–0	(England) Aston Villa	Milan
20:30 (CET)	Klinsmann 7'; Berti 62'; Bianchi 74'	Report		Stadium: Giuseppe Meazza; Referee: (Soviet Union) Spirin

==== Eightfinals ====
28 November 1990	Inter (Italy)	3–0	(Socialist Federal Republic of Yugoslavia) Partizan	Milan
20:30 (CET)	Matthäus 32'; Mandorlini 47'; Bianchi 68'	Report		Stadium: Giuseppe Meazza; Referee: (Austria) Kohl

12 December 1990	Partizan (Socialist Federal Republic of Yugoslavia)	1–1	(Italy) Inter	Belgrad
18:30 (CET)	Stevanović 62'	Report	65' Matthäus	Stadium: Partizan; Referee: (France) Vautrot

==== Quarterfinals ====
6 March 1991	Atalanta (Italy)	0–0	(Italy) Inter	Bergamo
20:30 (CET)		Report		Stadium: Comunale; Referee: (Austria) Forstinger

20 March 1991	Inter (Italy)	2–0	(Italy) Atalanta	Milan
20:30 (CET)	Serena 60'; Matthäus 63'	Report		Stadium: Giuseppe Meazza; Referee: (Portugal) Dos Santos

==== Semifinals ====
10 April 1991	Sporting Lisboa (Portugal)	0–0	(Italy) Inter	Lisbon
22:00 (CET)		Report		Stadium: José Alvalade; Referee: (Socialist Federal Republic of Yugoslavia) Petrović

24 April 1991	Inter (Italy)	2–0	(Portugal) Sporting Lisboa	Milan
20:30 (CEST)	Matthäus 15' (pen.); Klinsmann 35'	Report		Stadium: Giuseppe Meazza; Referee: (France) Biguet

==== Final ====
8 May 1991	Inter (Italy)	2–0	(Italy) Roma	Milan
20:30 (CEST)	Matthäus 55' (pen.); Berti 67'	Report		Stadium: Giuseppe Meazza; Attendance: 68 887; Referee: (Soviet Union) Spirin

22 May 1991	Roma (Italy)	1–0	(Italy) Inter	Rome
20:30 (CEST)	Rizzitelli 81'	Report		Stadium: Olimpico; Attendance: 70 900; Referee: (France) Quiniou

== Statistics ==
=== Players statistics ===
No.	Pos	Nat	Player	Total		Serie A		Coppa		UEFA	
No.	Pos	Nat	Player	Apps	Goals	Apps	Goals	Apps	Goals	Apps	Goals
	GK	(Italy) ITA	Walter Zenga	48	-37	32	-27	4	-3	12	-7
	DF	(Italy) ITA	Giuseppe Bergomi	46	4	30	3	4	1	12	0
	DF	(Italy) ITA	Riccardo Ferri	39	0	26	0	2	0	11	0
	DF	(Italy) ITA	Antonio Paganin	43	0	25+5	0	4	0	9	0
	DF	(West Germany) FRG	Andreas Brehme	36	2	23	1	4	1	9	0
	MF	(Italy) ITA	Alessandro Bianchi	48	4	34	2	3	0	11	2
	MF	(Italy) ITA	Sergio Battistini	43	3	27+1	2	4	1	11	0
	MF	(West Germany) FRG	Lothar Matthäus	46	23	31	16	3	1	12	6
	MF	(Italy) ITA	Nicola Berti	45	9	30	4	4	1	11	4
	FW	(West Germany) FRG	Jürgen Klinsmann	49	17	33	14	4	0	12	3
	FW	(Italy) ITA	Aldo Serena	44	9	30	8	4	0	10	1
	GK	(Italy) ITA	Astutillo Malgioglio	2	-4	2	-4	0	-0	0	-0
	MF	(Italy) ITA	Fausto Pizzi	38	3	19+8	3	4	0	7	0
	MF	(Italy) ITA	Paolo Stringara	29	1	13+9	1	4	0	3	0
	MF	(Italy) ITA	Andrea Mandorlini	27	1	12+6	0	2	0	7	1
	MF	(Italy) ITA	Giuseppe Baresi	30	0	7+16	0	2	0	5	0
	FW	(Italy) ITA	Maurizio Iorio	5	0	0+5	0	0	0	0	0
	DF	(Italy) ITA	Massimiliano Tacchinardi	3	0	0+2	0	0	0	1	0
	GK	(Italy) ITA	Luciano Bodini	0	0	0	-0	0	-0		
	MF	(Italy) ITA	Davide Fontolan	0	0	0	0	0	0	0	0
	FW	(Italy) ITA	G. Marino	0	0	0	0				
	MF	(Italy) ITA	Barollo	0	0	0	0				
	FW	(Italy) ITA	Marco Delvecchio	0	0	0	0				
	FW	(Italy) ITA	M.Grossi	0	0	0	0				

- Source: http://calcio-seriea.net/presenze/1990/1003/

== Sources ==
- - RSSF - Italy Championship 1990/91
