= The Surgery Center at Doral =

Coordinates: 25.808454°N 80.330030°W

Geography
- Location: 3650 NW 82nd Ave, Doral, Florida, United States

History
- Opened: 2008

Links
- Lists: Hospitals in the United States

The Surgery Center at Doral is an outpatient sports medicine, urology, and ambulatory surgery center located in Doral, Miami, Florida.The center works in partnership with and provides advanced surgical training for physicians and healthcare specialists from countries in the Caribbean, Central America, and South America.

The center is notable for performing advanced adult stem cell transplantation operations, such as biologic joint replacement and preservation procedures.

== History ==
The Surgery Center at Doral was founded by Dr. Alejandro Badia in association with OrthoNOW and accredited by The Joint Commission (TJC) in 2008. The Medical Director and Chief of Anesthesia is Dr. Ramon Cabreja.

The center became licensed by the Florida Agency for Health Care Administration in August 2008. It is accredited by the American Association for Accreditation of Ambulatory Surgery Facilities (AAAASF) and certified by Medicare.

== Partnerships ==
The Surgery Center at Doral's international sports medicine team is the official medical provider of the IronMan 70.3 Miami Triathlon, which is held annually in October.

The center's international sports medicine team is part of the Soccerex Medical Masters Panel which partners with international sports governing bodies FIFA and CONCACAF.
