= List of awards and honours received by Sepp Blatter =

Joseph "Sepp" Blatter (born 10 March 1936) is a Swiss sports administrator who, from 1998 to 2015, served as the eighth president of FIFA, the world governing body of association football. Before being banned from football for eight years in 2015, Blatter has received numerous honours and awards from nation states, sport governing bodies, special interest groups, universities, and cities.

== Individual honours ==
Individual honours awarded to Blatter include the American Global Award for Peace, and the title of "International Humanitarian of the Year" and the "Golden Charter of Peace and Humanitarianism" from the International Humanitarian League for Peace and Tolerance.

Blatter's efforts for peace have also won him a limited edition watch, the "Dove of Geneva" made by the Swiss watchmakers Quinting.

Blatter has also received Soccerex's "Tenth Anniversary Soccerex Merit Award" and the 'Best World Sports award' from the Graduate School of Business Administration in Zurich, Switzerland, and the South African Ekurhuleni Metropolitan Municipality's 'Golden Key Recognition Trophy'.

== Foreign honours ==
Appointments

Country	Date	Ribbon	Appointment	Ref.
Jordan	Date unknown		Order of Independence	
Bolivia	Date unknown		Medalla al Mérito Deportivo	
South Africa	1998		Order of Good Hope	
Liberia	1999		Humane Order of African Redemption	
Tunisia	2001		Grand Cordon de l'Ordre de la République Tunisienne	
(United Arab Emirates) UAE	2003		Order of Zayed	
Morocco	2004		Grand Officer, Order of the Throne	
Yemen	2004		Award of Merit	
France	2004		Knight of the French Legion of Honour	
Central African Republic	2005		Commander, Ordre de la Médaille de la Reconnaissance	
Sudan	2005		Order of the Two Niles	
Djibouti	2005		Commander, L'Ordre National du 27 Juin 1977	
Germany	2006		Grand Cross of the Order of Merit	
Ukraine	2007		Order of Prince Yaroslav the Wise, Grade V	
Uzbekistan	2007		Order of Friendship	
Kyrgyzstan	2007		Order of Danaker	
India	2007		Crown of Peace	
Venezuela	2007		Order of Francisco de Miranda - First Class	
Bahrain	2008		Bahrain, Medal of the First Degree	
Palestine	2008		Wissam Al-Qods (Order Jerusalem), with distinction	
Japan	2009	ribbon bar	Grand Cordon of the Order of the Rising Sun	
Kazakhstan	2009	ribbon bar	Order of Friendship	
South Korea	2010		Order of Merit for Sports	
South Africa	2010		Order of the Companions of O. R. Tambo	
Malaysia	2011		Dato' Sri – First Class Grand Commander of the Most Distinguished Order of the Sri Sultan Ahmad Shah Pahang	

== Honorary degrees ==
- University of Benin, Benin City, Nigeria, 2011
- De Montfort University, Leicester, United Kingdom, 2005 withdrawn 22 December 2015
- Nelson Mandela Metropolitan University, Port Elizabeth, South Africa, 2006
- International University, Geneva, Switzerland, 2007
- Azerbaijan State Academy of Physical Training and Sport, Baku, Azerbaijan
- An honorary diploma from the President of Azerbaijan, Ilham Aliyev.

== Honorary citizenships ==
East Timor made Blatter an honorary citizen in 2011. Blatter has also been awarded honorary citizenships from the cities of Bangkok (2006), Guatemala City and Managua in 2011. Blatter was appointed an honorary citizen of Visp, his hometown in southwestern Switzerland, in 2006.

== Sports association honours ==
Honours from sport governing bodies and associations awarded to Blatter include the Order of Olympic Merit from the International Olympic Committee, the 'Global Award for Peace' from the International Amateur Athletic Association, and honorary memberships of the German Football Association, Swiss Football Association, the Swiss Olympic Association, and Real Madrid C.F. Blatter has also been awarded the 'Necklace of Honour' from the Ecuadorian Football Federation in 2010, the Asian Football Confederation's Diamond of Asia Award in 2006 and UEFA's Order of Merit in Diamond in 2004.
