= Jürgen Klinsmann =

German footballer and manager (born 1964)

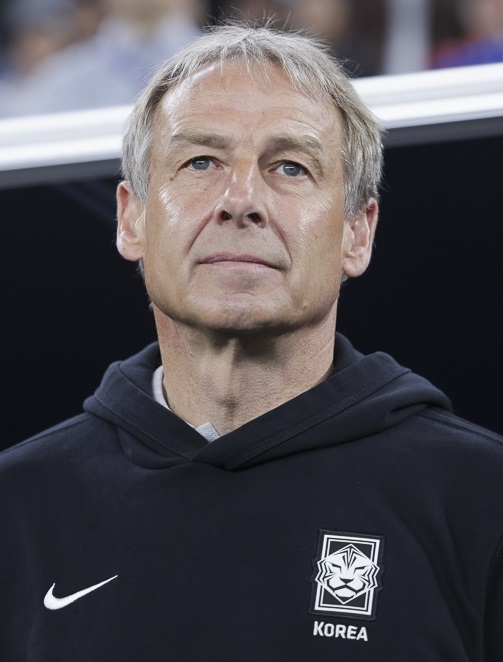
- Klinsmann managing South Korea in 2024

Personal information
- Full name: Jürgen Klinsmann
- Date of birth: 30 July 1964 (age 62)
- Place of birth: Göppingen, West Germany
- Height: 1.81 m (5 ft 11 in)
- Position: Striker

Youth career
- 1972–1974: TB Gingen
- 1974–1978: SC Geislingen
- 1978–1981: Stuttgarter Kickers

Senior career*
Years	Team	Apps	(Gls)
1981–1984	Stuttgarter Kickers	61	(22)
1984–1989	VfB Stuttgart	156	(79)
1989–1992	Inter Milan	95	(34)
1992–1994	Monaco	65	(29)
1994–1995	Tottenham Hotspur	41	(20)
1995–1997	Bayern Munich	65	(31)
1997–1998	Sampdoria	8	(2)
1997–1998	→ Tottenham Hotspur (loan)	15	(9)
2003	Orange County Blue Star	8	(5)
Total		514	(231)

International career
1980–1981	West Germany U16	3	(0)
1984–1985	West Germany U21	8	(3)
1987–1988	West Germany Olympic	14	(8)
1987–1998	West Germany / Germany	108	(47)

Managerial career
- 2004–2006: Germany
- 2008–2009: Bayern Munich
- 2011–2016: United States
- 2019–2020: Hertha BSC
- 2023–2024: South Korea
Medal record
Men's football
Representing Germany
FIFA World Cup
Winner	1990 Italy
UEFA European Championship
Winner	1996 England
Runner-up	1992 Sweden
Olympic Games
Third place	1988 Seoul	Team
Representing Germany
FIFA World Cup
Third place	2006 Germany
Representing Germany (as manager)
FIFA Confederations Cup
Third place	2005 Germany
Representing United States (as manager)
CONCACAF Gold Cup
Winner	2013 United States
- * Club domestic league appearances and goals

Jürgen Klinsmann (German pronunciation: [ˈjʏʁɡn̩ ˈkliːnsman]; born 30 July 1964) is a German professional football manager and former player. He played for several prominent clubs in Europe including VfB Stuttgart, Inter Milan, Monaco, Tottenham Hotspur, and Bayern Munich. He was part of the West German team that won the 1990 FIFA World Cup and the unified German team that won the UEFA Euro 1996.

As a manager, Klinsmann managed the German national team to a third-place finish at the 2006 FIFA World Cup and was subsequently coach of a number of other teams including Bundesliga club Bayern Munich and the United States national team.

Considered one of Germany's premier strikers during the 1990s, Klinsmann scored in all six major international tournaments he participated in for Germany, from UEFA Euro 1988 to the 1998 FIFA World Cup. In 1995, he came in third in the FIFA World Player of the Year award; in March 2004 he was named in the FIFA 100 list of the "125 Greatest Living Footballers". In 2016, he became the fifth player to be named as honorary captain of Germany.

== Club career ==
=== 1972–1981: Youth career ===
At age eight, he began playing for TB Gingen, an amateur football club in Gingen an der Fils. Six months later, he scored 16 goals in a single match for his new club. At age ten, he moved to SC Geislingen. When he was 14 years old, his father bought a bakery in Stuttgart, the state capital. After the family relocated there, Klinsmann continued to play for SC Geislingen, even after he was spotted in a Württemberg youth selection. In 1978, aged 14, he signed a contract with Stuttgarter Kickers, the club where he would turn professional two years later. His parents decided he should first finish his apprenticeship as a baker in their family business, which he completed in 1982.

=== 1981–1989: Stuttgarter Kickers and VfB Stuttgart ===
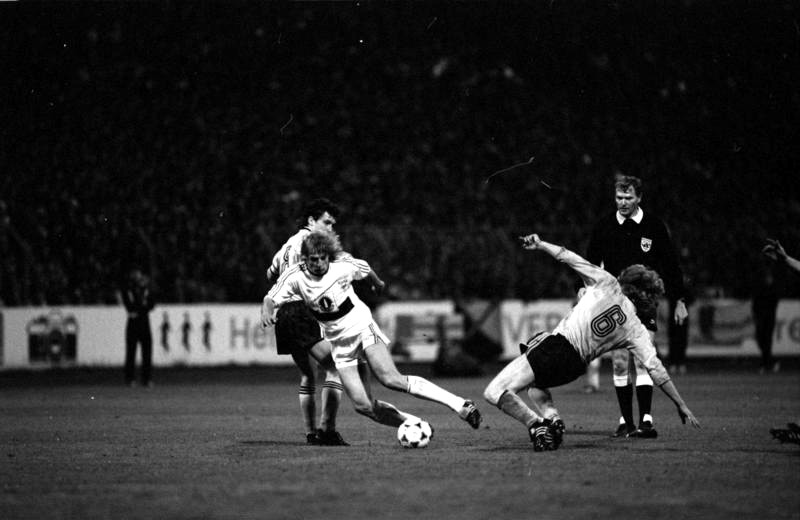
Klinsmann (centre) playing for VfB Stuttgart against Dynamo Dresden in the semi-final of the 1988–89 UEFA Cup

Klinsmann began his professional career in 1982 at the then-second division side Stuttgarter Kickers. By 1982–83, he was already a regular starter and by the end of the 1983–84 season, he had scored 19 goals for the club. Horst Buhtz, a Stuttgarter Kickers former coach, recalls Klinsmann benefited from intensive training from Horst Allman, who was one of the best sprint coaches in Germany at that time. At the beginning of the new season, he managed to improve his 100 m dash from 11.7 to 11.0 seconds.

In 1984, Klinsmann moved to first division rivals VfB Stuttgart. In his first season at the club, he scored 15 goals and was the team's joint top scorer with Karl Allgöwer. Despite his goal scoring efforts, he could not prevent his new club from finishing tenth in the league. During each of the 1985–86 and 1986–87 seasons, he scored 16 goals and reached the 1986 final of the DFB-Pokal, losing against Bayern Munich 2–5, but scoring the last goal of the match. In the 1987–88 season, he scored 19 goals – including a legendary overhead kick against Bayern – and was the Bundesliga's top goalscorer.

In 1988, the 24-year-old Klinsmann was named German Footballer of the Year. After reaching the 1988–89 UEFA Cup final with Stuttgart (eventually losing to Diego Maradona's inspired Napoli 5–4 on aggregate), Klinsmann moved to Italian club Inter Milan on a three-year contract, joining two other German internationals, Lothar Matthäus and Andreas Brehme.

=== 1989–1992: Inter Milan ===
In spite of the heavily defensive orientated tactics of head coach Giovanni Trapattoni, Klinsmann scored 13 goals as the Nerazzurri finished third in Serie A. He became one of the most popular foreign players in Italy, mostly because he had learnt Italian and earned himself the respect of the fans with his appearance and language skills.

During the next season, Klinsmann won the UEFA Cup with Inter (2–1 on aggregate against Roma) and repeated his previous performance in the league with 14 goals; his contract was extended until 1994. A disastrous 1991–92 season caused all plans to fall through. Inter never managed to gain any momentum under coach Corrado Orrico and finished eighth in the league, with Klinsmann only scoring seven goals and the team being divided and fragmented into groups. It was clear for Klinsmann this would be his last season at the San Siro.

=== 1992–1994: AS Monaco ===
After UEFA Euro 1992, Klinsmann moved to Monaco and catapulted the club to a second-place finish in the league in his first season. After the bribery scandal by Marseille and their subsequent disqualification as league winners, Monaco replaced them in the 1993–94 UEFA Champions League, reaching the semi-final before finally losing to eventual winners Milan. The following season, Monaco only managed a ninth-place finish in the league. Klinsmann, who had missed two months due to a torn ligament, was mostly deployed as a lone-striker and started criticizing the attitude of his teammates. In 1994, he left the club early, with one more year remaining on his contract.

=== 1994–1995: Tottenham Hotspur ===
Klinsmann moved to Tottenham Hotspur in the Premier League for the 1994–95 season, where the fans and media were very critical of the German because of his reputation as a diver. He was signed by Spurs in July 1994 from Monaco for £2 million. On his debut against Sheffield Wednesday, he scored the winning header and immediately won over fans with his goal celebration by self-deprecatingly diving to the ground. A Guardian journalist who had written an article called "Why I Hate Jürgen Klinsmann", wrote another two months later called "Why I Love Jürgen Klinsmann". Klinsmann went on to win the 1995 Football Writers' Association Footballer of the Year.

Because of his humour, but also because of his athletic achievements and his combative playing style, Klinsmann quickly became extremely popular in England; over 150,000 of his shirts were sold. He now holds legendary status at Spurs and was inducted into Madame Tussauds Wax Museum.

Klinsmann scored 20 goals in the 1994–95 season for Spurs and a total of 29 in all competitions, including a late winner against Liverpool in the quarter-final of the FA Cup. He also found the net in the semi-final, but Spurs missed out on a place in the final by losing 4–1 to Everton.

A transfer to FC Bayern Munich followed a call with club president Franz Beckenbauer. Looking back 31 years later, he said he understood that Tottenham, despite his affection, was unlikely to win the league nor even play in Europe at the time. The transfer would capitalise on his good form and Bayern's prospects as he began the later stages of his career.

=== 1995–2003: Final years ===
Klinsmann then had a successful spell at Bayern Munich during the 1995–96 and 1996–97 season. He was the club's top goalscorer during both seasons, and won the 1995–96 UEFA Cup, setting a new goalscoring record of 15 goals in 12 matches during the competition (a record that stood until 2011). A year later, he also became German champion as he won the Bundesliga.

He then briefly moved to Italy for Sampdoria, but left the team in the winter and returned to Tottenham Hotspur. During his second stint at Tottenham in the 1997–98 season, his goals saved the club from relegation, particularly the four goals he scored in a 6–2 win at Wimbledon. He played the last match of his high-level club career in 1998 on the final day of the Premier League against Southampton.

After retiring and moving to the United States, in 2003 Klinsmann played for Orange County Blue Star, an amateur team in the fourth-tier Premier Development League.

== International career ==
On 12 December 1987, Klinsmann debuted for the West German senior squad in a 1–1 friendly draw against Brazil. He was an important part of the West German team that won the 1990 FIFA World Cup. After qualifying for the round of 16, Germany was to play the Netherlands, against whom they had lost two years earlier at UEFA Euro 1988. After Rudi Völler was sent off in the 22nd minute, Klinsmann was forced to play as a lone striker. He scored the 1–0 opener and his performance received considerable praise. German newspaper Süddeutsche Zeitung wrote that "In the last decade, not a single forward of a DFB team has offered such a brilliant, almost perfect performance." After further victories over Czechoslovakia (1–0) and England (1–1 after extra time, 4–3 on penalties), he became a world champion after beating Argentina 1–0 in the final. Klinsmann is remembered for being fouled by the Argentinian Pedro Monzón, who was subsequently sent off, reducing Argentina to ten men. Many critics called the incident a prime example of Klinsmann's diving, a claim he contradicted. In a 2004 interview, he noted that the foul left a 15 cm gash on his shin. His last international tournament with Germany was the 1998 FIFA World Cup, in which they were eliminated in the quarter-finals by surprising debutants Croatia.

== Coaching career ==
=== Germany ===
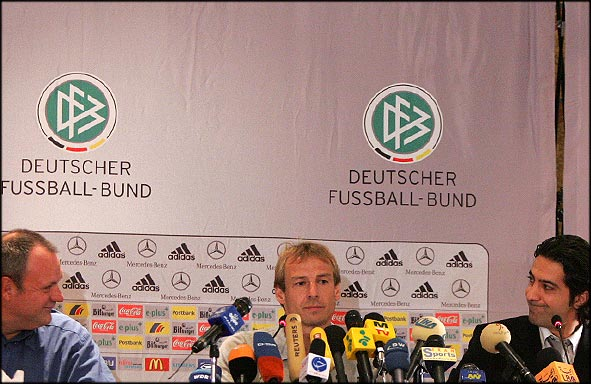
Klinsmann at a press conference as Germany's manager in October 2004.

On 26 July 2004, Klinsmann returned to Germany as the new head coach of the national team, succeeding former teammate and strike partner Rudi Völler. Klinsmann subsequently embarked on an aggressive program to revamp the management of the team. Bringing fellow German striker Oliver Bierhoff on board helped diffuse public relations duties of the previous combined post away from the actual coaching aspect of the position. Furthermore, he created a youth movement to breathe life into an aging squad on the heels of a disastrous showing at Euro 2004. In the run-up to the 2006 World Cup, Klinsmann attracted criticism from German fans and the media following poor results, such as the 4–1 loss to Italy. A particular subject of criticism was that Klinsmann commuted to Germany from the U.S., which was the target of a campaign by the tabloid Bild. Klinsmann previously eliminated some privileges Bild traditionally had with the national team, such as receiving the team lineup the day before a match and 24/7 exclusive access to the team. His largely offensive tactics have irritated some, who complained he ignored defensive football. He announced a squad of young players for the 2006 World Cup, basing his selection policy on performance, not reputation.

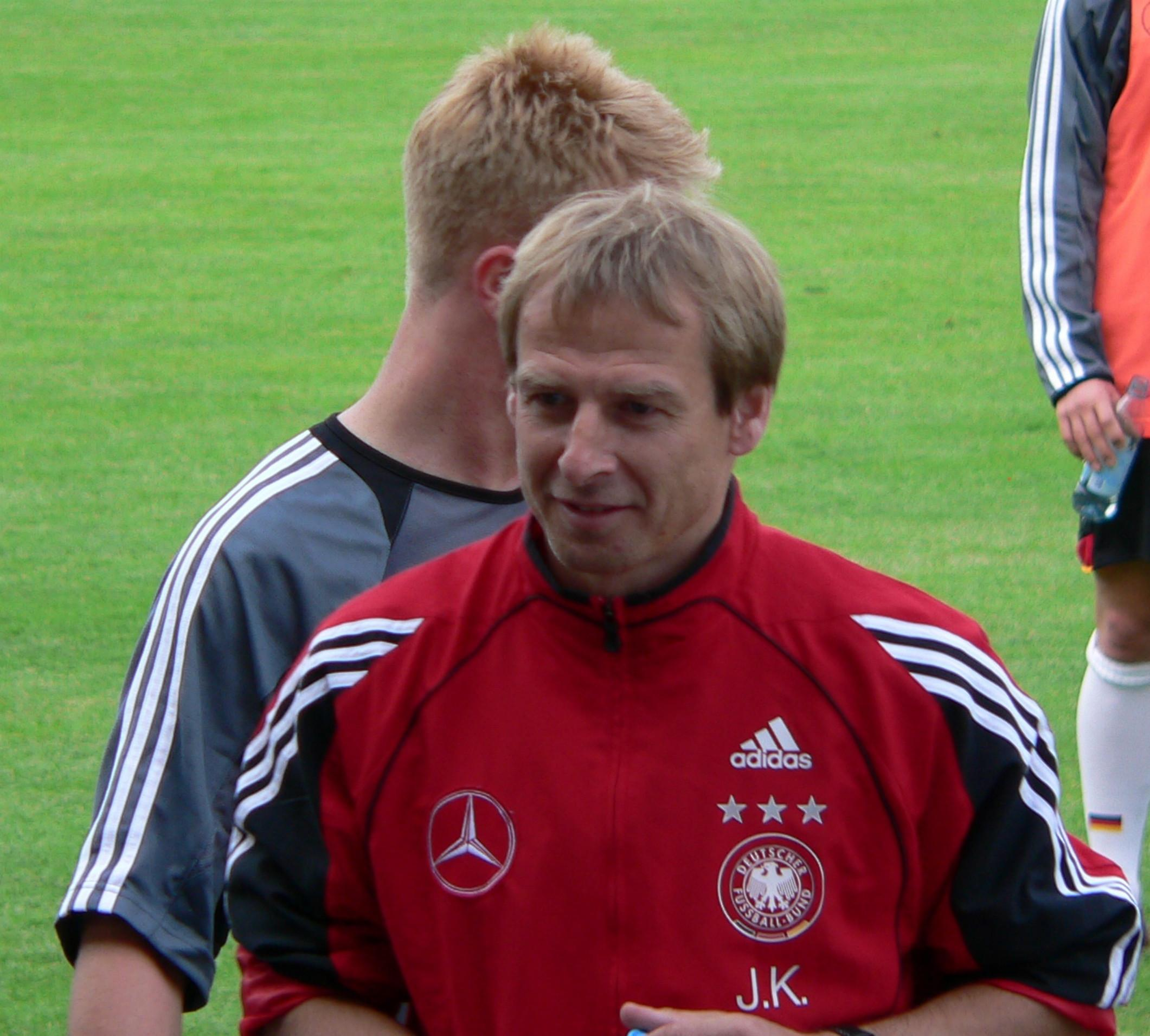
Klinsmann as manager of Germany in 2005

During the 2005 FIFA Confederations Cup, he regularly rotated his goalkeepers regardless of their performances, which drew the ire of Bayern Munich's Oliver Kahn. On 7 April 2006, Klinsmann finally decided to relegate Kahn to the bench and designated Arsenal's Jens Lehmann as his first choice goalkeeper. This choice followed Lehmann's performances in the 2005–06 UEFA Champions League in which his Arsenal team bowed out in the final against Barcelona.

In the 2006 World Cup, Germany's performances silenced Klinsmann's critics, which included the form of an English song: "Who Do You Think You Are Kidding Jurgen Klinsmann?" The team recorded three-straight wins against Costa Rica, Poland and Ecuador in the group stage, earning Germany first place in Group A. The first match of the knockout stage was a 2–0 victory over Sweden, and in the quarter-finals, Klinsmann's team defeated Argentina, winning 4–2 on penalties. The teams drew 1–1 after 120 minutes after an equalising goal from Miroslav Klose in the 80th minute.

In the semi-final on 4 July, Germany lost a close match with Italy 2–0 after goals in the final minutes of extra time from Fabio Grosso and Alessandro Del Piero. After the match, Klinsmann praised the performance of his young team. They beat Portugal 3–1 in the third place play-off, where he played Kahn instead of Jens Lehmann. The victory triggered a massive parade in Berlin the following day where Klinsmann and the team were honoured by the public.

Afterward, Franz Beckenbauer, previously a strident critic of Klinsmann's, declared his desire to see Klinsmann continue as coach. There was also widespread public support for Klinsmann due to his team's spirit and attacking style of play. The team's strong performance is thought by some to have renewed national pride and restored Germany's reputation as a top soccer nation. Due to his success coaching the national team, Klinsmann was awarded the Bundesverdienstkreuz.

Despite the highly acclaimed performance at the World Cup and the praise earned, Klinsmann declined to renew his contract, informing the German Football Association (DFB) of his decision on 11 July 2006. The decision was officially announced by the DFB on 12 July 2006. Klinsmann's assistant, Joachim Löw, was appointed as the new head coach at the same press conference. Klinsmann said, "My big wish is to go back to my family, to go back to leading a normal life with them... After two years of putting in a lot of energy, I feel I lack the power and the strength to continue in the same way."

=== Bayern Munich ===
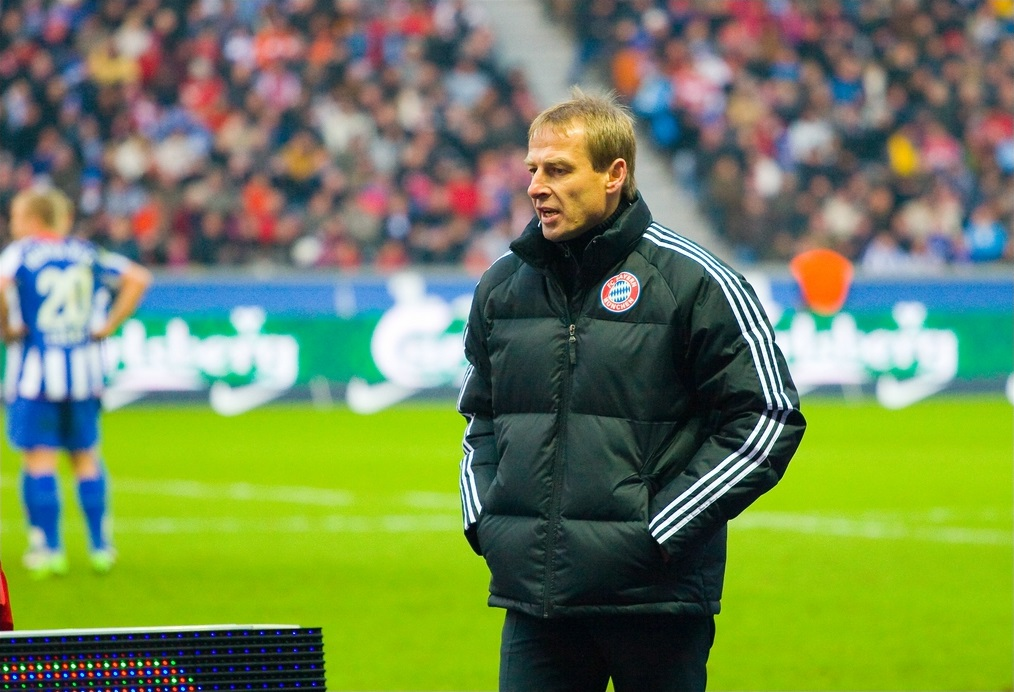
Klinsmann as manager of Bayern Munich in 2009

In January 2008, it was announced that Klinsmann would become Bayern Munich coach in July, succeeding Ottmar Hitzfeld. After beginning his role, Klinsmann made large changes to the club's training ground and structure in an attempt to modernise the club's culture. Notably, he installed Buddha statues in the training ground, which were criticised in the media and quickly removed.

Bayern started the season poorly and Klinsmann came under pressure as early as September, after a 5–2 home loss to Werder Bremen. After a 3–3 draw with VfL Bochum in October, Bayern were in 11th place in the Bundesliga and some fans chanted that Klinsmann should be sacked.

Bayern reached the quarter-final of the Champions League, after beating Sporting CP 12–1 on aggregate in the first knockout round, a Champions League record. However, they would lose heavily to eventual winners FC Barcelona in the next round, losing the first leg 4–0. Franz Beckenbauer described the team's performance as "the most dreadful I've ever seen from a Bayern team." Earlier that week, Bayern had lost 5–1 to Felix Magath's VfL Wolfsburg in a crucial league match.

Klinsmann was sacked on 27 April 2009 with five matches remaining. His final match was a 1–0 loss to Schalke 04. Bayern were in third-place at the time of the sacking. Klinsmann finished with a record of 25 wins, nine draws, and 10 losses in all competitions.

Following Klinsmann's time with Bayern, Bayern team captain Phillip Lahm wrote in his autobiography that Klinsmann's tenure with the club was a "failure" and that Klinsmann's lack of tactical instruction required the players to meet before kickoff to discuss strategy. Although they were largely criticised at the time, some of the changes he made at Bayern have since been recognised as helping contribute to the club's subsequent success.

=== Toronto FC ===
In November 2010, Klinsmann was hired as a technical consultant for Major League Soccer (MLS) club Toronto FC to advise on an overhaul of the club's coaching and playing personnel, leading the club to hire Aron Winter as head coach and Paul Mariner as technical director the following year. Both Winter and Mariner would later be fired by the club during a last place finish in the 2012 season.

=== United States ===
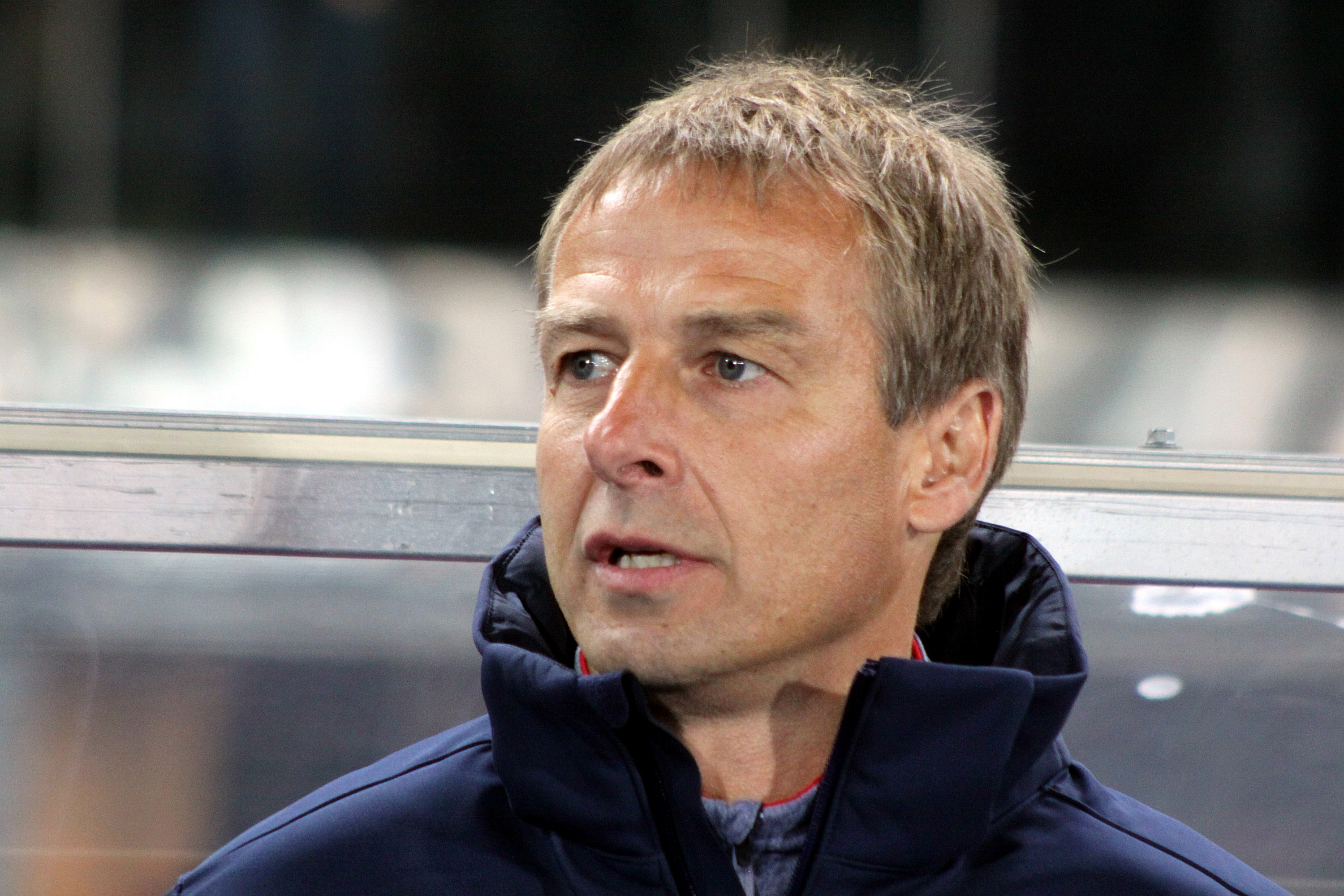
Klinsmann as manager of the United States

On 29 July 2011, Klinsmann was named the 35th head coach of the United States national team, replacing previous manager Bob Bradley, who had been fired following a 4–2 loss to Mexico in the final of the 2011 CONCACAF Gold Cup.

The U.S. struggled in friendly games early in Klinsmann's tenure, losing four matches and drawing one before ending the 2011 season with a victory over Slovenia. On 29 February 2012, the U.S. national team recorded a historic 1–0 victory in a friendly match away against Italy, its first win against the four-time World Cup champions. On 15 August 2012, Klinsmann coached the U.S. to a historic 1–0 win against long time rivals Mexico in a friendly held at the Estadio Azteca, giving the U.S. its first victory in the stadium.

In 2013, Klinsmann led the U.S. team into the final round of qualification for the 2014 FIFA World Cup, beginning with a 2–1 loss at Honduras before earning a point with a scoreless draw against Mexico in the Azteca. On 2 June 2013, the United States played their centennial celebratory game against Germany, where Klinsmann coached them to a 4–3 win over his native country. On 28 July, Klinsmann coached the U.S. team to their fifth CONCACAF Gold Cup title, defeating Panama 1–0 in the final. On 10 September 2013, following a 2–0 win over Mexico, the United States secured qualification for the World Cup. On 12 December 2013, Klinsmann signed a new contract extension with the United States Soccer Federation (USSF), lasting until 2018.

==== 2014 World Cup ====
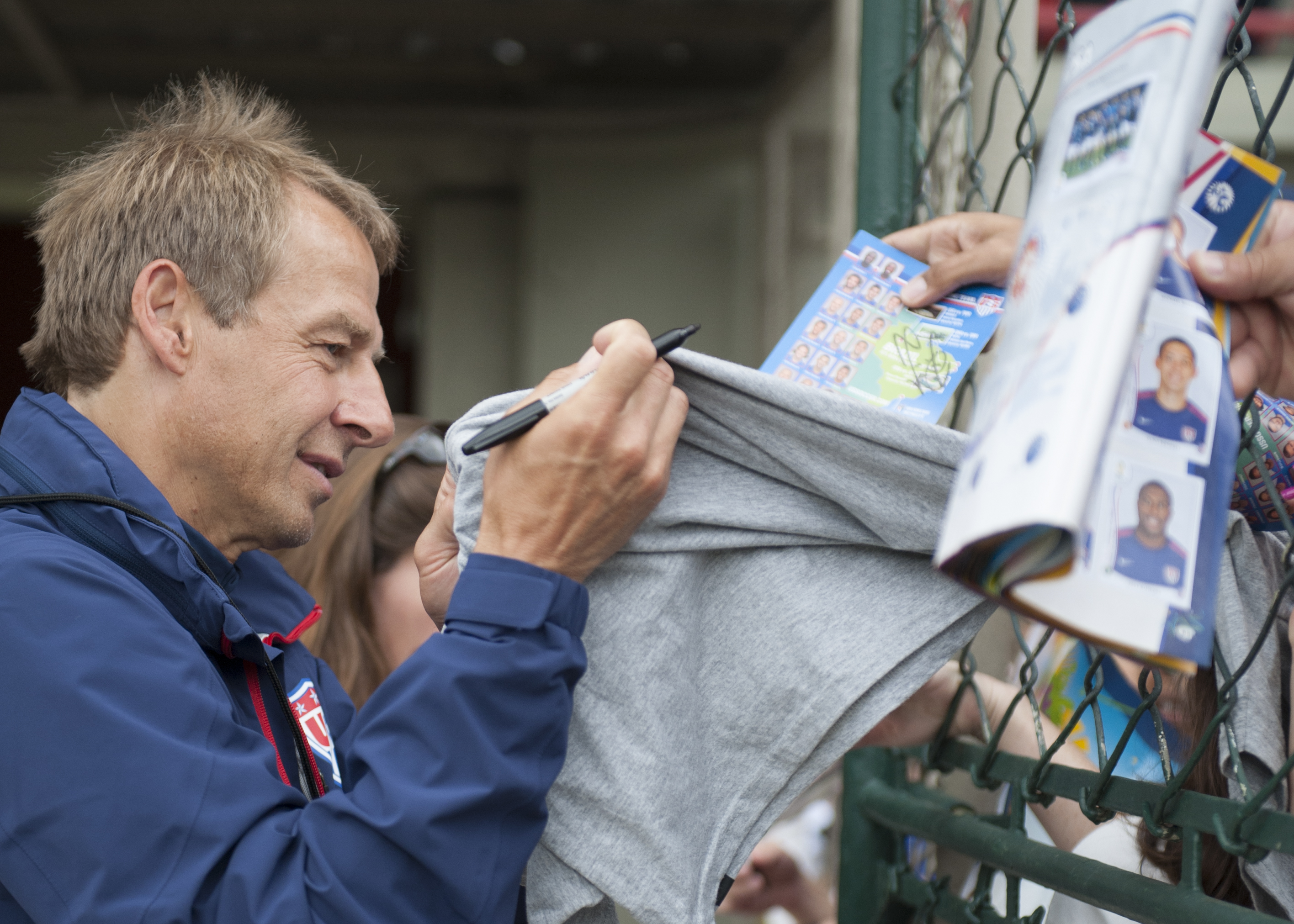
Klinsmann signs a fan's shirt after the training session at São Paulo FC's training camp in Brazil.

Klinsmann surprised the U.S. football world in May 2014 by selecting five so-called "Jurgen Americans", players with American serviceman fathers and German mothers who had all been born and professionally trained in Germany, to the 23-men squad in the 2014 FIFA World Cup. His selection particularly received criticism when he cut all-time leading U.S. scorer Landon Donovan from the final roster for the 2014 World Cup following the team's preliminary training camp. Klinsmann described it as "the most difficult decision of [his] coaching career" but that he sees other players "slightly ahead of [Donovan]". Klinsmann faced further controversy after his son Jonathan posted a comment on Twitter ridiculing Donovan, causing some to speculate that the decision was influenced by personal animosity between Klinsmann and Donovan.

On 16 June, Klinsmann guided the United States to a 2–1 win over Ghana in their first match of the 2014 World Cup, behind an early strike from captain Clint Dempsey and a dramatic 86th-minute header from substitute John Brooks. On 22 June, his side drew 2–2 against Portugal in the second group match. A defensive miscue early in the game led to an easy Portugal goal, but Jermaine Jones equalized with a strike from 30 yards out in the second half. Then, in the 81st minute, Dempsey scored to give the U.S. a 2–1 lead. The score remained 2–1 until the final seconds of stoppage time where Cristiano Ronaldo sent a cross that was headed past U.S. goalkeeper Tim Howard by Silvestre Varela. On 26 June, the U.S. faced Germany. With possible elimination looming again as their round of 16 spot hung in the balance, the U.S. fell to the Germans, 1–0, but the hope of surviving the "group of death" remained alive in the Portugal–Ghana game in which Portugal defeated Ghana, 2–1, sending the U.S. to the round of 16.

The U.S. drew Belgium in the round of 16. After spending much of the match defending against Belgium's potent attack, with goalkeeper Tim Howard setting a World Cup finals record for saves in a match, the U.S. survived with a 0–0 score after 90 minutes, sending the match to extra time. After quickly falling behind 2–0 to Belgium in extra time, the U.S. cut the deficit in half in the 107th minute when substitute Julian Green volleyed in a lobbed through ball from Michael Bradley, but were unable to score a second and were eliminated.

==== 2018 World Cup cycle ====
Klinsmann led the U.S. to a 1–0 win over Czech Republic to open the new 2018 World Cup cycle on 3 September, its first win over the Czechs. On 5 June 2015, Klinsmann guided the U.S. to a dramatic 4–3 win over the Netherlands in a friendly in Amsterdam and another friendly victory over Germany five days later.

The U.S. under Klinsmann finished fourth in the 2015 CONCACAF Gold Cup following losses to Jamaica in the semi-finals and Panama in the third place match, the team's worst performance in the tournament since 2000. In 2016, Klinsmann successfully advanced the U.S. through its first round of World Cup qualification out of a group containing Guatemala, Trinidad and Tobago, and St. Vincent and the Grenadines.

The U.S. opened the final World Cup qualification round in November 2016 with a 2–1 home defeat to Mexico and a 4–0 away defeat to Costa Rica. Following the losses, which left the U.S. at the bottom of the qualification table, Klinsmann was fired by the USSF on 21 November 2016, being replaced by LA Galaxy manager Bruce Arena, who had previously coached the team from 1998 to 2006. Ultimately, the U.S. failed to qualify for the 2018 FIFA World Cup.

=== Hertha BSC ===
On 27 November 2019, Klinsmann became the new manager of Hertha BSC, replacing Ante Čović. On 11 February 2020 he announced via Facebook that he would step down as coach after having been in this position for just ten weeks. Despite stating his intention of remaining part of the club's supervisory board, he was ultimately barred from doing so as Hertha's investor Lars Windhorst publicly criticized his behavior, calling the manner of his departure "unacceptable".

=== South Korea ===
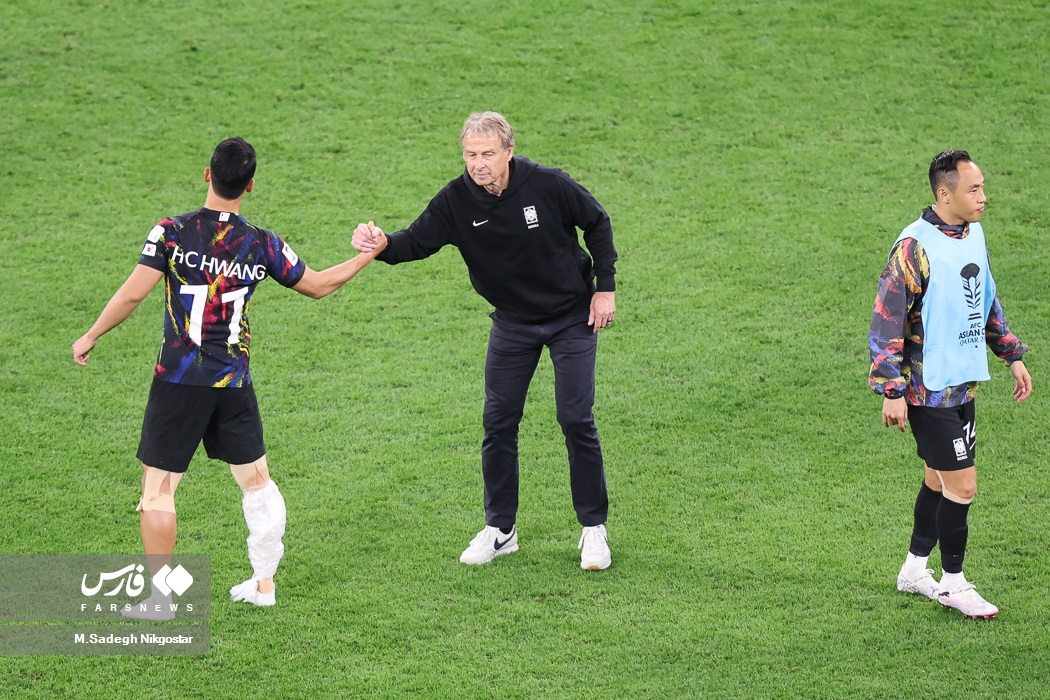
Klinsmann at the 2024 Asian Nations Cup with Hwang Hee-chan

On 27 February 2023, Klinsmann was named head coach of South Korea, replacing Paulo Bento on a contract through the conclusion of the 2026 FIFA World Cup. Klinsmann was described as highly unpopular with South Korean fans due to his unusual practice of spending long periods out of South Korea, alleged lack of interest in players in the K League 1 and questionable squad selections. Following the team's poor performances in friendly matches, criticism of Klinsmann ramped up. This grew increasingly problematic during the 2023 AFC Asian Cup, when South Korea had only a win and two draws in the group stages (3–1 Bahrain), (2–2 Jordan), (3–3 Malaysia), forcing a challenging knockout game against Saudi Arabia. During this match, Klinsmann's tactics and player selections were highly criticised. In the end, South Korea lost to Jordan, 2–0, in the semifinal on 7 February, prompting heavy scrutiny of Klinsmann's tactics and work ethic from the South Korean public and the team. On 16 February, the Korea Football Association fired Klinsmann, citing "failure to demonstrate leadership" as one of the reasons.

== Charity work and social engagements ==
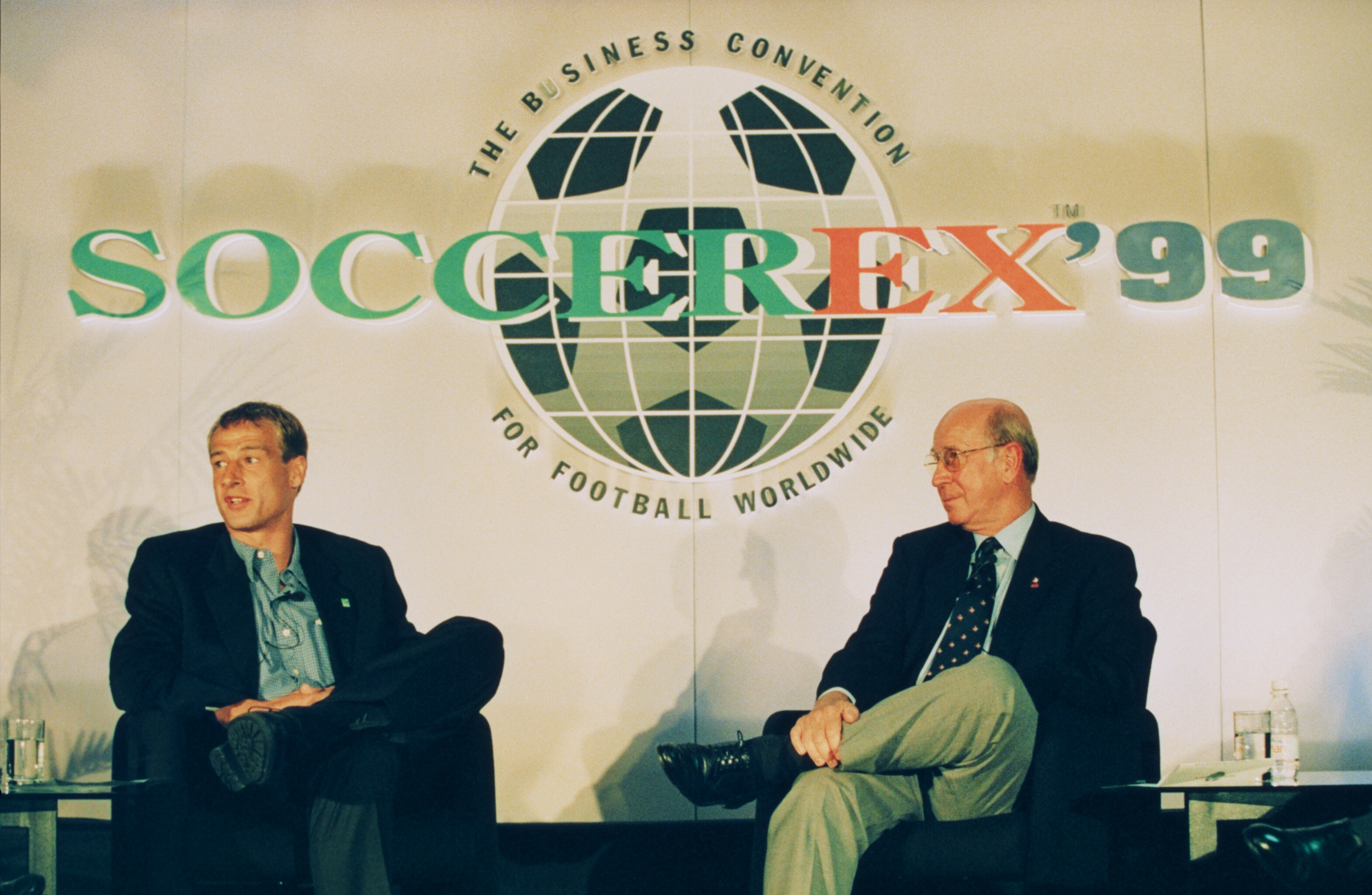
Klinsmann with Bobby Charlton at the 1999 Soccerex event in Los Angeles

In 1995, Klinsmann and some of his close friends founded the children charity foundation Agapedia, which stems from the Greek language and translates to "Love for Children". In 1997, Klinsmann, acting as the captain of the Germany national team, visited the Holocaust memorial place Yad Vashem in Israel alongside his coach Berti Vogts. This visit was televised around the globe and drew worldwide attention. Klinsmann is also a board member of the German Initiative Für die Zukunft lernen, which means "Learning for the future", and supports the education of young people about the Holocaust. In May 1999, Klinsmann donated all the proceeds from his farewell match (more than US$1 million) to different children's charity organizations. The match was a sell-out with 54,000 fans in Stuttgart's Gottlieb-Daimler-Stadion. Famous personalities such as Bryan Adams, Boris Becker and many others contributed to this event.

== Personal life ==
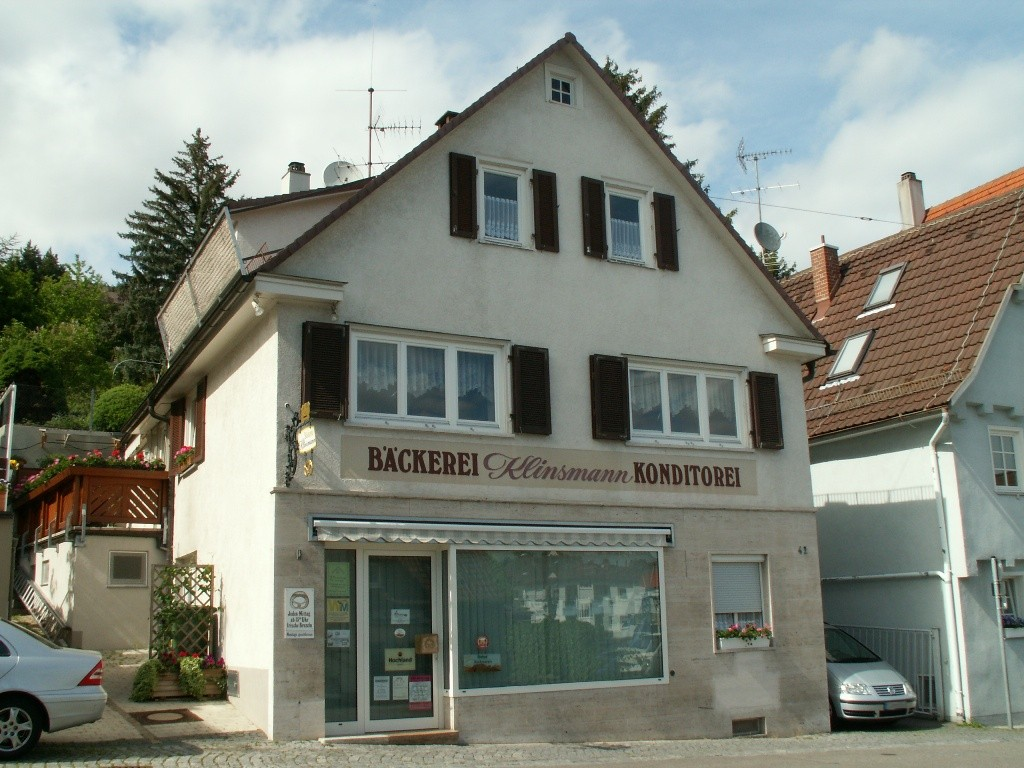
Klinsmann Bakery in Botnang, Stuttgart

Klinsmann was born in Göppingen. His family moved to Stuttgart when he was a teenager. Klinsmann's family operates a bakery in Stuttgart's Botnang district and consequently he is sometimes affectionately referred to as the "baker's son from Botnang". Klinsmann is, in fact, a journeyman baker, having served an apprenticeship.

He is married to Debbie Chin (Chinese: 德碧; pinyin: Dé Bì), an American former model of Chinese descent, having proposed to her back in 1995; they wed later that year in Milan.

Klinsmann lives in Huntington Beach, California. He and his wife have two children. Son Jonathan, a goalkeeper, has been capped at age group level for the United States U-20 team. Aside from German, Klinsmann is fluent in English, Italian and French, and is a certified commercial helicopter pilot. He is a naturalized U.S. citizen. Klinsmann has also worked as a pundit, working with ESPN for the 2010 World Cup, and with BBC Sport at the 2018 World Cup, 2020 European Championship, and 2022 World Cup. He works on ESPN FC as of 2021. He wrote the daily email newsletter from Qatar for BBC Sport during the World Cup 2022.

On 25 November 2022, following Iran's 2–0 victory over Wales in the 2022 World Cup, Klinsmann received backlash after his controversial comments made on BBC. Klinsmann claimed that the reason Iran won was because they used dirty tactics to manipulate Guatemalan referee Mario Escobar and that it was a part of Iranian football culture to play dirty. He then went on to claim that head coach Carlos Queiroz was a failure during his stint at Colombia and Egypt, stating "This is not by coincidence, this is all [done] purposely ... This is just part of their culture." Carlos Queiroz responded inviting Klinsmann to the Iran camp to show him what Iranian football culture truly is, and petitioned FIFA to remove him as a member of the Qatar 2022 Technical Study Group.

In April 2023, Klinsmann was one of the 22 personal guests at the ceremony in which former Chancellor Angela Merkel was decorated with the Grand Cross of the Order of Merit for special achievement by President Frank-Walter Steinmeier at Schloss Bellevue in Berlin.

== Career statistics ==
=== Club ===
Appearances and goals by club, season and competition
Club	Season	League			National cup (Note: Includes DFB-Pokal, Coppa Italia, Coupe de France, FA Cup)		League cup (Note: Includes Football League Cup)		Europe		Total	
Club	Season	Division	Apps	Goals	Apps	Goals	Apps	Goals	Apps	Goals	Apps	Goals
Stuttgarter Kickers	1981–82	2. Bundesliga	6	1	0	0	–		–		6	1
Stuttgarter Kickers	1982–83	2. Bundesliga	20	2	2	1	–		–		22	3
Stuttgarter Kickers	1983–84	2. Bundesliga	35	19	2	2	–		–		37	21
Stuttgarter Kickers	Total		61	22	4	3	–		–		65	25
VfB Stuttgart	1984–85	Bundesliga	32	15	4	2	–		2	0	38	17
VfB Stuttgart	1985–86	Bundesliga	33	16	6	4	–		–		39	20
VfB Stuttgart	1986–87	Bundesliga	32	16	1	2	–		4 (Note: Appearances in European Cup Winners' Cup)	1	37	19
VfB Stuttgart	1987–88	Bundesliga	34	19	1	0	–		–		35	19
VfB Stuttgart	1988–89	Bundesliga	25	13	4	2	–		8 (Note: Appearances in UEFA Cup)	4	37	19
VfB Stuttgart	Total		156	79	16	10	–		14	5	186	94
Inter Milan	1989–90	Serie A	31	13	4	2	–		2 (Note: Appearances in European Cup)	0	37	15
Inter Milan	1990–91	Serie A	33	14	4	0	–		12	3	49	17
Inter Milan	1991–92	Serie A	31	7	5	1	–		1	0	37	8
Inter Milan	Total		95	34	13	3	–		15	3	123	40
Monaco	1992–93	Division 1	35	20	2	0	–		4	0	41	20
Monaco	1993–94	Division 1	30	10	3	2	–		10 (Note: Appearances in UEFA Champions League)	4	43	16
Monaco	Total		65	30	5	2	–		14	4	84	36
Tottenham Hotspur	1994–95	Premier League	41	20	6	5	3	4	–		50	29
Bayern Munich	1995–96	Bundesliga	32	16	1	0	–		12	15	45	31
Bayern Munich	1996–97	Bundesliga	33	15	4	2	–		2	0	39	17
Bayern Munich	Total		65	31	5	2	–		14	15	84	48
Sampdoria	1997–98	Serie A	8	2	1	0	–		1	0	10	2
Tottenham Hotspur (loan)	1997–98	Premier League	15	9	3	0	0	0	–		18	9
Career total			506	227	53	25	3	4	58	27	620	284

=== International ===
Appearances and goals by national team and year
National team	Year	Apps	Goals
West Germany	1987	2	0
West Germany	1988	8	2
West Germany	1989	4	1
West Germany	1990	12	4
Total		26	7
Germany	1990	3	2
Germany	1991	4	0
Germany	1992	13	2
Germany	1993	10	6
Germany	1994	14	11
Germany	1995	9	6
Germany	1996	14	7
Germany	1997	7	2
Germany	1998	8	4
Total		82	40

Scores and results list West Germany's and Germany's goal tally first, score column indicates score after each Klinsmann goal.

List of international goals scored by Jürgen Klinsmann
No.	Date	Venue	Opponent	Score	Result	Competition
Goals scored for West Germany
1	27 April 1988	Fritz-Walter-Stadion, Kaiserslautern, West Germany	Switzerland	1–0	1–0	Friendly
2	14 June 1988	Parkstadion, Gelsenkirchen, West Germany	Denmark	1–0	2–0	UEFA Euro 1988
3	4 October 1989	Westfalenstadion, Dortmund, West Germany	Finland	3–0	6–1	1990 FIFA World Cup qualifying
4	25 April 1990	Neckarstadion, Stuttgart, West Germany	Uruguay	3–2	3–3	Friendly
5	10 June 1990	Stadio Giuseppe Meazza, Milan, Italy	Yugoslavia	2–0	4–1	1990 FIFA World Cup
6	15 June 1990	Stadio Giuseppe Meazza, Milan, Italy	United Arab Emirates	2–0	5–1	1990 FIFA World Cup
7	24 June 1990	Stadio Giuseppe Meazza, Milan, Italy	Netherlands	1–0	2–1	1990 FIFA World Cup
Goals scored for Germany
8	10 October 1990	Råsunda Stadium, Stockholm, Sweden	Sweden	1–0	3–1	Friendly
9	31 October 1990	Stade Josy Barthel, Luxembourg, Luxembourg	Luxembourg	1–0	3–2	UEFA Euro 1992 qualifying
10	18 June 1992	Ullevi, Gothenburg, Sweden	Netherlands	1–2	1–3	UEFA Euro 1992
11	20 December 1992	Estadio Centenario, Montevideo, Uruguay	Uruguay	4–0	4–1	Friendly
12	14 April 1993	Ruhrstadion, Bochum, Germany	Ghana	3–1	6–1	Friendly
13	14 April 1993	Ruhrstadion, Bochum, Germany	Ghana	5–1	6–1	Friendly
14	10 June 1993	Robert F. Kennedy Memorial Stadium, Washington, D.C., U.S.	Brazil	1–3	3–3	U.S. Cup
15	10 June 1993	Robert F. Kennedy Memorial Stadium, Washington, D.C., U.S.	Brazil	3–3	3–3	U.S. Cup
16	13 June 1993	Soldier Field, Chicago, U.S.	United States	1–0	4–3	U.S. Cup
17	19 June 1993	Silverdome, Pontiac, U.S.	England	2–1	2–1	U.S. Cup
18	23 March 1994	Gottlieb-Daimler-Stadion, Stuttgart, Germany	Italy	1–1	2–1	Friendly
19	23 March 1994	Gottlieb-Daimler-Stadion, Stuttgart, Germany	Italy	2–1	2–1	Friendly
20	2 June 1994	Ernst-Happel-Stadion, Vienna, Austria	Austria	3–0	5–1	Friendly
21	17 June 1994	Soldier Field, Chicago, U.S.	Bolivia	1–0	1–0	1994 FIFA World Cup
22	21 June 1994	Soldier Field, Chicago, U.S.	Spain	1–1	1–1	1994 FIFA World Cup
23	27 June 1994	Cotton Bowl, Dallas, U.S.	South Korea	1–0	3–2	1994 FIFA World Cup
24	27 June 1994	Cotton Bowl, Dallas, U.S.	South Korea	3–0	3–2	1994 FIFA World Cup
25	2 July 1994	Soldier Field, Chicago, U.S.	Belgium	2–1	3–2	1994 FIFA World Cup
26	16 November 1994	Qemal Stafa, Tirana, Albania	Albania	1–0	2–1	UEFA Euro 1996 qualifying
27	14 December 1994	Stadionul Republican, Chişinău, Moldova	Moldova	2–0	3–0	UEFA Euro 1996 qualifying
28	18 December 1994	Fritz-Walter-Stadion, Kaiserslautern, Germany	Albania	2–0	2–1	UEFA Euro 1996 qualifying
29	29 March 1995	Boris Paichadze Stadium, Tbilisi, Georgia	Georgia	1–0	2–0	UEFA Euro 1996 qualifying
30	29 March 1995	Boris Paichadze Stadium, Tbilisi, Georgia	Georgia	2–0	2–0	UEFA Euro 1996 qualifying
31	7 June 1995	Vasil Levski National Stadium, Sofia, Bulgaria	Bulgaria	1–0	2–3	UEFA Euro 1996 qualifying
32	11 October 1995	Cardiff Arms Park, Cardiff, Wales	Wales	2–1	2–1	UEFA Euro 1996 qualifying
33	15 November 1995	Olympic Stadium, Berlin, Germany	Bulgaria	1–1	3–1	UEFA Euro 1996 qualifying
34	15 November 1995	Olympic Stadium, Berlin, Germany	Bulgaria	3–1	3–1	UEFA Euro 1996 qualifying
35	24 April 1996	Feijenoord Stadion, Rotterdam, Netherlands	Netherlands	1–0	1–0	Friendly
36	4 June 1996	Carl-Benz-Stadion, Mannheim, Germany	Liechtenstein	8–1	9–1	Friendly
37	16 June 1996	Old Trafford, Manchester, England	Russia	2–0	3–0	UEFA Euro 1996
38	16 June 1996	Old Trafford, Manchester, England	Russia	3–0	3–0	UEFA Euro 1996
39	23 June 1996	Old Trafford, Manchester, England	Croatia	1–0	2–1	UEFA Euro 1996
40	4 September 1996	Ernest Pohl Stadium, Zabrze, Poland	Poland	2–0	2–0	Friendly
41	9 October 1996	Hrazdan Stadium, Yerevan, Armenia	Armenia	2–0	5–1	1998 FIFA World Cup qualifying
42	10 September 1997	Westfalenstadion, Dortmund, Germany	Armenia	1–0	4–0	1998 FIFA World Cup qualifying
43	10 September 1997	Westfalenstadion, Dortmund, Germany	Armenia	2–0	4–0	1998 FIFA World Cup qualifying
44	5 June 1998	Carl-Benz-Stadion, Mannheim, Germany	Luxembourg	2–0	7–0	Friendly
45	15 June 1998	Parc des Princes, Paris, France	United States	2–0	2–0	1998 FIFA World Cup
46	25 June 1998	Stade de la Mosson, Montpellier, France	Iran	2–0	2–0	1998 FIFA World Cup
47	29 June 1998	Stade de la Mosson, Montpellier, France	Mexico	1–1	2–1	1998 FIFA World Cup

=== Managerial ===
As of match played on 6 February 2024

Team	From	To	Record								
Team	From	To	M	W	D	L	GF	GA	GD	Win %	Ref.
Germany	26 July 2004	11 July 2006	34	20	8	6	81	41	+40	58.82	
Bayern Munich	1 July 2008	27 April 2009	44	25	9	10	96	50	+46	56.82	
United States	29 July 2011	21 November 2016	98	55	16	27	178	109	+69	56.12	
Hertha BSC	27 November 2019	11 February 2020	10	3	3	4	10	15	−5	30.00	
South Korea	27 February 2023	16 February 2024	18	8	7	3	38	19	+19	44.44	
Total			204	111	43	50	403	234	+169	54.41	—

== Honours ==
=== Player ===
VfB Stuttgart

- DFB-Pokal runner-up: 1985–86
- UEFA Cup runner-up: 1988-89

Inter Milan

- Supercoppa Italiana: 1989
- UEFA Cup: 1990–91

Bayern Munich

- Bundesliga: 1996–97
- UEFA Cup: 1995–96

West Germany and Germany

- FIFA World Cup: 1990
- UEFA European Championship: 1996; runner-up: 1992
- Summer Olympic Games: 1988 Bronze medal

Individual

- Goal of the Year (Germany): 1987
- Bundesliga top scorer: 1987–88
- kicker Bundesliga Team of the Season: 1987–88
- Footballer of the Year (Germany): 1988, 1994
- FIFA World Cup All-Star Team: 1990
- Premier League Player of the Month: August 1994
- Tottenham Hotspur Club Player of the Year: 1994
- FWA Footballer of the Year: 1994–95
- PFA Team of the Year: 1994–95 Premier League
- ESM Team of the Year: 1994–95
- IFFHS World's Top Goal Scorer: 1995
- Ballon d'Or runner-up: 1995
- FIFA World Player of the Year bronze award: 1995
- UEFA Cup top scorer: 1995–96
- World XI: 1996, 1999
- FIFA 100
- UEFA Jubilee Poll (2004): #64

=== Manager ===
Germany

- FIFA World Cup third place: 2006
- FIFA Confederations Cup third place: 2005

United States

- CONCACAF Gold Cup: 2013
- CONCACAF Cup runner-up: 2015

Individual

- German Football Manager of the Year: 2006
- CONCACAF Coach of the Year: 2013

=== Orders ===
- Order of Merit of Baden-Württemberg: 1999
- Silbernes Lorbeerblatt: 2006
- Bundesverdienstkreuz am Bande: 2006

== Literature ==
- Dietrich Schulze-Marmeling: Strategen des Spiels – Die legendären Fußballtrainer, Verlag Die Werkstatt, Göttingen 2005, ISBN 3-89533-475-8, S. 332ff.
- Jens Mende: Jürgen Klinsmann – Wie wir Weltmeister werden, Südwest-Verlag, München 2006, ISBN 3-517-08208-2.
- Michael Horeni: Klinsmann. Stürmer Trainer Weltmeister. Scherz, Frankfurt/Main 2005, ISBN 3-502-15045-1.

== See also ==
- List of men's footballers with 100 or more international caps
- National team managers with 100 or more matches

Sporting positions
Preceded by Lothar Matthäus	Germany captain 1995–1998	Succeeded by Oliver Bierhoff
Preceded by François Omam-Biyik	FIFA World Cup opening goal 1994	Succeeded by César Sampaio
