= Davide Cecotti =

Italian professional football player (born 1973)

Personal information
- Date of birth: 10 April 1973 (age 53)
- Place of birth: Udine, Italy
- Position: Goalkeeper

Senior career*
Years	Team	Apps	(Gls)
1989–1990	Manzanese		
1991–1993	Internazionale	1	(0)
1993–1994	Legnano	2	(0)
1995–1996	Pergocrema	0	(0)
1996	Triestina	0	(0)
1996–1997	Legnano	6	(0)
1998–2001	Siderno		
2002–2003	Pozzuolo del Friuli		
2003–2004	Pro Gorizia		
2004–2005	Pro Romans	28	(0)
2007–2008	Centrosedia		
2008–2010	Virtus Corno		
- * Club domestic league appearances and goals

Davide Cecotti (born 10 April 1973) is an Italian former professional football player. Cecotti played once for Inter Milan during the 1991–92 Serie A season.
