= Paolo Stringara =

Italian footballer and coach

Personal information
- Date of birth: 22 September 1962 (age 64)
- Place of birth: Orbetello, Italy
- Height: 1.78 m (5 ft 10 in)
- Position: Defensive midfielder

Team information
- Current team: South Korea (coach)

Youth career
- Inter Milan

Senior career*
Years	Team	Apps	(Gls)
1980–1983	Siena	64	(5)
1983–1984	Rende	21	(0)
1984–1986	Siena	62	(5)
1986–1990	Bologna	127	(7)
1990–1991	Inter Milan	22	(1)
1991–1992	Avellino	23	(2)
1992–1993	Bologna	17	(0)
1994–1995	Aosta	15	(1)
1995–1996	Iperzola	15	(0)
Total		366	(21)

Managerial career
- 1995–1996: Iperzola
- 1996–1998: Livorno
- 1998–1999: Modena
- 1999–2000: Viterbese
- 2000–2001: L'Aquila
- 2001–2002: Pistoiese
- 2003: Spezia
- 2005: Torino
- 2006: Perugia
- 2007: Lucchese
- 2008–2009: Taranto
- 2009–2010: Cavese
- 2010: Cosenza
- 2011–2012: Foggia
- 2012: Barletta
- 2015: Grosseto
- 2015–2016: United States (coach)
- 2021–2022: Pro Livorno
- 2023–2024: South Korea (coach)
- * Club domestic league appearances and goals

Paolo Stringara (born 22 September 1962) is an Italian football coach and a former professional player, He is currently assistant coach of South Korea.

== Playing career ==
Stringara started his career in the youth ranks of Inter Milan, then making his professional debut in 1980 with Siena. In 1986 he joined Bologna, with whom he played in Serie C1, Serie B and Serie A, including captaining the Rossoblu during the 1989–90 season.

He returned at Inter in 1990, being part of the Nerazzurri squad that won the 1990–91 UEFA Cup. He left Inter for Avellino the following season, and then returned to Bologna a year later.

He retired in 1996 after a season as player-manager of amateurs Iperzola.

== Coaching career ==
After working as player-manager of Iperzola, Stringara took over at Serie C2 club Livorno in 1996, guiding them to Serie C1 at his first season in charge. Following a number of Serie C experiences, he was offered his first Serie B job in 2001 at Pistoiese. In 2005 he had a short-lived experience in charge of Torino, being in charge for a few days before the club went bankrupt and then being refounded by Urbano Cairo.

After more Serie C jobs, the last of which in 2015 at Grosseto, Stringara accepted an offer from friend and former teammate Jürgen Klinsmann to work alongside him in charge of the United States national soccer team.

On 16 November 2021, Stringara returned into management as the new head coach of Serie D amateurs Pro Livorno. He was dismissed on 17 March 2022, leaving Pro Livorno dead last in the league table.

== Honours ==
Inter

- UEFA Cup: 1990–91
