= Pasquale Rocco =

Italian footballer

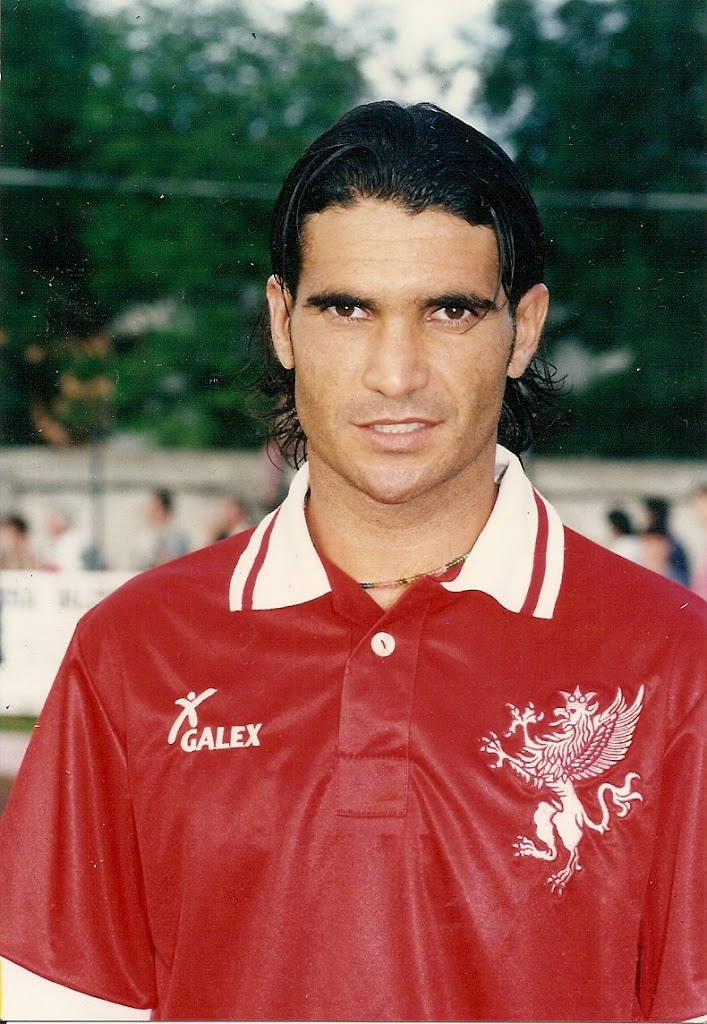
- Rocco with Perugia in 1997

Personal information
- Full name: Pasquale Domenico Rocco
- Date of birth: 11 October 1970 (age 56)
- Place of birth: Paderno Dugnano, Italy
- Height: 1.80 m (5 ft 11 in)
- Position: Midfielder

Senior career*
Years	Team	Apps	(Gls)
1988–1991	Internazionale	1	(0)
1989–1991	→ Cagliari (loan)	43	(1)
1991–1992	Venezia	22	(0)
1992–1994	Pisa	69	(11)
1994–1998	Perugia	62	(4)
1995–1997	→ Torino (loan)	41	(2)
1999	Cremonese	9	(0)
1999–2000	Treviso	16	(1)
2000–2001	Pistoiese	15	(1)
2001–2002	Livingston	0	(0)
2002–2003	Pistoiese	9	(0)
2003–2004	Sangiovannese	15	(0)
- * Club domestic league appearances and goals

Pasquale Domenico Rocco (born 11 October 1970) is an Italian former professional footballer who played as a midfielder.

He represented Italy at the 1992 Summer Olympics.

== Honours ==
Inter

- Serie A champion: 1988–89.
