= Raffaele Nuzzo =

Italian footballer (born 1973)

Personal information
- Date of birth: 21 February 1973 (age 53)
- Place of birth: Monza, Italy
- Height: 1.89 m (6 ft 2 in)
- Position: Goalkeeper

Youth career
- Inter Milan

Senior career*
Years	Team	Apps	(Gls)
1991–2000	Inter Milan	1	(0)
1992–1994	→ Pergocrema (loan)	2	(0)
1994–1995	→ Fasano (loan)	26	(0)
1995–1996	→ Livorno (loan)	2	(0)
1996–1997	→ Gualdo (loan)	17	(0)
1999	→ Coventry City (loan)	0	(0)
2000–2007	Reggiana	84	(0)
2001	→ Wigan Athletic (loan)	0	(0)
Total		132	(0)
- * Club domestic league appearances and goals

Raffaele Nuzzo (born 21 February 1973) is an Italian former professional footballer. He spent most of his career in the Italian Serie C1 and Serie C2, in the role of a backup goalkeeper.

== Career ==
=== Inter Milan ===
Born in 1973, in Monza, which at the time was in the Province of Milan (now in the Province of Monza and Brianza), Nuzzo started his professional career at Inter Milan, one of the major Italian clubs of the region, initially joining the team's youth side.

Since the 1992 season, he spent his career on loan at various Serie C2 clubs, as Inter Milan had more experienced players as their second goalkeeper, such as Beniamino Abate, Luca Mondini, Marco Landucci and Andrea Mazzantini. He played 26 out of 34 league matches for Fasano, and his performances secured him a move to Livorno, a team with the aim of obtaining promotion to Serie C1. He played two matches for the Serie C2 runners-up, but the club failed to obtain promotion as they lost in the playoffs. The following season, he moved to Gualdo of Serie C1, which had finished in fifth place the previous season. Due to the departure of Davide Torchia and Oscar Verderame, he became one of the team's first choice keepers, along with the more experienced Marco Savorani. Although Gualdo finished just above the relegation zone, Nuzzo's performances earned him a place in Inter Milan's first team, as third goalkeeper behind Andrea Mazzantini, but ahead of the young youth products. He was on the bench for the second leg of the club's victorious 1994 UEFA Cup Final (Beniamino Abate was on the bench for the first leg). In the 1998–99 season, Inter Milan signed Sébastien Frey, which led to Mazzantini's departure from the club in the January transfer window, while Nuzzo remained as the team's third-choice keeper. He played his only match in Serie A and for Inter Milan on the last matchday of the Serie A season, on 23 May 1999, when he came on as a substitute for starting goalkeeper Gianluca Pagliuca in the last minute of Inter's match against Bologna, with the score 2–1; the match ended in a 3–1 victory for Inter.

In June 1999, Nuzzo left for FA Premier League side Coventry City on loan, along with Antonio Caruso. Following Steve Ogrizovic's recovery from injury, who was originally the team's second goalkeeper, Nuzzo was sent back to Inter Milan in November. His only Coventry appearance was one to forget. It came in the League Cup against Tranmere Rovers, as the second-tier team trounced their Premier League opponents 5–1.

=== Reggiana ===
After he returned from England, Nuzzo was signed by Reggiana in January 2000. In his first season with the team, he played as a backup to Mirko Bellodi and Beniamino Abate, replacing the recently departed Alberto Maria Fontana. In his second season with the team, he played as Lorenzo Squizzi's backup. As the club also had Andrea Artich and Michele Nicoletti, he left for England again in February 2001, joining Wigan Athletic, but did not make a single first team appearance for the club.

He returned to Reggiana in the 2001–02 season, where he continued to serve as the team's backup goalkeeper, for Patrick Bettoni. In 2002–03 season, however, he played as the team's first choice keeper, ahead of Luca Mondini, making 19 appearances. The following season, however, Mondini was restored as the team's first choice keeper. In the 2004–05 season, Gabriele Paoletti succeed Mondini as Reggiana's first choice keeper, and Nuzzo played one match for the team throughout the season, which ultimately ended in relegation to Serie C2 in 2005.

In his final years with club, he finally became the team's first choice keeper, as the club had only signed the inexperienced Davide Bagnacani as an additional goalkeeper, who had recently graduated from Piacenza Calcio's youth system.

After the club lost in the promotion playoffs in 2007, Nuzzo retired from professional football. He was replaced by Marco Ambrosio and Luca Tomasig.
