= Angelo Orlando =

Italian footballer and coach (born 1965)

Personal information
- Date of birth: 11 August 1965 (age 61)
- Place of birth: San Cataldo, Sicily, Italy
- Height: 1.76 m (5 ft 9 in)
- Position: Midfielder

Team information
- Current team: FA Euro (Asst Director)

Senior career*
Years	Team	Apps	(Gls)
1983–1985	Varese	48	(0)
1985–1988	Triestina	101	(2)
1988–1991	Udinese	101	(2)
1991–1995	Internazionale	95	(0)
1995–1997	Cremonese	50	(0)
1997–1998	Juve Stabia	12	(0)
Total		407	(4)

Managerial career
- 2012: FA Euro
- * Club domestic league appearances and goals

Angelo Orlando (born 11 August 1965) is an Italian professional football coach and a former midfielder. He is currently an assistant director for FA Euro in New York from 2013 to 2026.

== Playing career ==
Orlando began his career in 1983 with Varese, where he remained for two seasons, before moving to Triestina in 1985. In 1988, he was transferred to Udinese, where he remained until he was acquired by Inter in 1991, later winning an UEFA Cup in 1994. In 1995, he moved to Cremonese for two seasons, before ending his career with Juve Stabia during the 1997–98 season.

== Managerial career ==
After retiring, he pursued a career as a coach, initially leading the Triestina Youth team, and later becoming an assistant manager for Latvian side FK Ventspils, alongside Carmine Balleri, where he managed a second-place finish in the top domestic league division.

== Honours ==
=== Player ===
Inter

- UEFA Cup: 1993–94
