= Corrado Orrico =

Italian football coach (born 1940)

Personal information
- Date of birth: 16 April 1940 (age 86)
- Place of birth: Massa, Italy

Senior career*
Years	Team	Apps	(Gls)
1960–1966	Sarzanese		

Managerial career
- 1966–1969: Sarzanese
- 1969–1970: Carrarese
- 1970–1972: Massese
- 1972–1975: Camaiore
- 1975–1979: Carrarese
- 1979–1980: Udinese
- 1980–1983: Carrarese
- 1983–1984: Brescia
- 1984–1986: Carrarese
- 1986–1987: Prato
- 1987–1988: Carrarese
- 1988–1991: Lucchese
- 1991–1992: Inter Milan
- 1994–1995: Carrarese
- 1995–1996: Avellino
- 1996–1997: Siena
- 1997–1998: Alessandria
- 1998–1999: Empoli
- 1999–2000: Lucchese
- 2001–2002: Treviso
- 2002–2003: Massese
- 2006–2007: Carrarese
- 2008–2009: Prato
- 2013: Gavorrano
- * Club domestic league appearances and goals

Corrado Orrico (born 16 April 1940) is an Italian football coach.

== Career ==
Orrico started his coaching career by serving as head in a number of minor division clubs in his native Tuscany, and he gained popularity after guiding Lucchese to impressive results in the Italian Serie B, narrowly missing a historic promotion in the top-flight; such results led Inter Milan chairman Ernesto Pellegrini to appoint him as new head coach for the 1991–92 season as a replacement for Giovanni Trapattoni, who had won the scudetto with the nerazzurri side in the 1988–89 season. One of his first moves was to assign the #5 shirt to German captain Lothar Matthäus instead of his usual #10. However, his career at Inter turned out to be extremely unsatisfactory, and he was sacked after a few games in the national league and a disappointing UEFA Cup campaign that ended with an early elimination by Boavista FC. His position was taken by Luis Suárez.

He then coached, with little success, a number of minor league teams, mostly from his native Tuscany. In 2008, he marked his football comeback by accepting an offer from Serie C2 team Prato. He left Carrarese in June 2009, after his son committed suicide; his dead body was found by Orrico himself.

In April 2013, following the sacking of Renato Buso, 73-year-old Orrico was appointed new head coach of Lega Pro Seconda Divisione strugglers Gavorrano, in deep relegation zone with four remaining games until the end of the season. He failed to escape relegation, with Gavorrano being defeated in the relegation playoffs.
