= Beniamino Abate =

Italian footballer (born 1962)

Personal information
- Full name: Beniamino Abate
- Date of birth: 10 April 1962 (age 64)
- Place of birth: San Martino Valle Caudina, Italy
- Height: 1.84 m (6 ft 0 in)
- Position: Goalkeeper

Youth career
- 1978–1982: Benevento
- 1982–1983: Napoli

Senior career*
Years	Team	Apps	(Gls)
1983–1985	Benevento	59	(0)
1985–1990	Udinese	73	(0)
1990–1991	Messina	37	(0)
1991–1994	Internazionale	12	(0)
1994–1995	Fidelis Andria	28	(0)
1995–1997	Cagliari	18	(0)
1997–2000	Reggiana	39	(0)
2000–2001	Prato	0	(0)
Total		266	(0)

Managerial career
- 2001–2008: Milan (goalkeeper coach)
- 2008–2015: Milan (goalkeeper coach–youth team)
- 2015–2016: Milan (goalkeeper coach–youth team)
- 2016–2018: Milan (goalkeeper coach–U12)
- 2018–2020: Milan (goalkeeper coach–youth team)
- 2020–: Milan (goalkeeper coach–U18)
- * Club domestic league appearances and goals

Beniamino Abate (born 10 April 1962) is an Italian former professional footballer who played as goalkeeper. He is currently the goalkeeping coach of the Milan Primavera (under-19) squad. He is the father of Ignazio Abate who played as right-back for Milan.

== Playing career ==
During his career, Abate played in Serie C1 with Benevento, in Serie A with Udinese, Internazionale and Cagliari, as well as in Serie B with Reggiana, where ended his career. In Serie A, he played a total of 67 matches.

During his time with Inter, he was included on the bench for the first leg of the victorious 1994 UEFA Cup Final (Raffaele Nuzzo was on the bench for the second leg).

== Managerial career ==
Abate currently works in the A.C. Milan youth sector as a goalkeeping coach and was previously a scout.

== Honours ==
Internazionale

- UEFA Cup: 1993–94
