= Marcello Montanari =

Italian footballer and manager

Personal information
- Date of birth: 25 September 1965 (age 61)
- Place of birth: Portoferraio, Italy
- Height: 1.83 m (6 ft 0 in)
- Position: Defender

Senior career*
Years	Team	Apps	(Gls)
1983–1984	Reggiana	6	(0)
1984–1985	Livorno	1	(0)
1985–1987	Venezia	41	(0)
1987–1989	Carrarese	58	(2)
1989–1991	Lucchese	62	(1)
1991–1992	Internazionale	12	(0)
1992–1997	Bari	130	(1)
1997–2001	Lucchese	83	(3)
2001–2003	Massese	57	(2)

Managerial career
- 2008–: Reggiana (assistant)
- * Club domestic league appearances and goals

Marcello Montanari (born 25 September 1965 in Portoferraio) is an Italian football coach and former professional player who played as a defender.
