= Massimiliano Tacchinardi =

Italian footballer (born 1971)

Personal information
- Full name: Massimiliano Tacchinardi
- Date of birth: 2 August 1971 (age 55)
- Place of birth: Crema, Italy
- Height: 1.78 m (5 ft 10 in)
- Position: Defender

Senior career*
Years	Team	Apps	(Gls)
1990–1991	Inter Milan	2	(0)
1991–1992	Messina	5	(0)
1992–1994	Pro Sesto	29	(0)
1994–1995	Romanese	4	(0)
1995–1996	Ponsacco	16	(0)
1996–1997	Trevigliese	16	(1)
2000–2002	U.S. Oriese		
2002–2004	U.S. Somaglia		
- * Club domestic league appearances and goals

Massimiliano Tacchinardi (born 2 August 1971) is an Italian former professional footballer who played as a defender.

He is the elder brother of fellow former footballer Alessio Tacchinardi.
