= Soccerex =

London association football organization

- Industry: Sport industry
- Founded: 1995
- Headquarters: Unit G, Taper Building, 175 Long Lane, London, United Kingdom
- Area served: Worldwide
- Key people: Duncan Revie (Co-Founder); Rita Revie (Co-Founder); Joseph DaGrosa (Chairman)
- Number of employees: 30
- Website: soccerex.com

Soccerex is an organisation that runs events for the association football industry, based in London.

== Foundation ==
The company was founded in 1995 by Duncan Revie, CEO until his death in 2016, son of the Leeds and England manager Don Revie, COO Rita Revie and chairman Tony Martin. The event was conceived in the Midland Hotel, Manchester, while Duncan and Rita were attending a business event for the music industry and noted a gap in the market for football business.

== Football business events ==
The first event was held at Wembley Stadium in 1996. Soccerex returned to Wembley in 1997 before hosting events in Paris in 1998, Los Angeles in 1999 and Old Trafford, Manchester, held the 5th edition in 2000. Following this period, the event settled in Dubai from 2001 to 2006 where it grew its customer base and began to attract greater attention, with appearances from leading figures of the game including the then FIFA President Sepp Blatter, David Dein, Peter Kenyon, David Gill and Umberto Gandini as well as football legends including Diego Maradona, Ronaldo, Sir Bobby Robson, Xavi Hernandez, Deco, Michael Owen, Juan Sebastian Veron, Gary Lineker, Landon Donovan and Raul Gonzalez.

In 2005, the company launched a regional sub-event concept, starting with the London Forum head the Institute of Directors, to cater for local markets for organisations who could not attend the event in Dubai. Following the Forums launch the main Soccerex event was rebranded as a Global Convention.

In 2007 the Global Convention moved to Johannesburg in advance of the 2010 FIFA World Cup in partnership with the Gauteng Provincial Government. It would remain there until 2009, when the event transferred to Rio de Janeiro in a tenure contracted to stretch until 2013 ahead of the 2014 FIFA World Cup. The cancellation of its 18th annual industry conference, scheduled to take place in Rio de Janeiro in November 2013, caused concern that there might be problems with the 2014 FIFA World Cup, due to be held in Brazil in June and July of the following year. In 2014 the event returned to Manchester, a tenure that lasted until 2017.

Alongside the Global Convention, the organisation has also held its Forum level events in London (2005–2009), Dubai (2008), Brasília (2009), Singapore (2010), Manchester (2010–2013), Durban (2012–2014), Barbados (2014), Jordan (2014–2015), Mexico (2016) and Qatar (2016) as well as a seminar event in Lagos (2012) and a roadshow in Belém (2012).

In 2018, Soccerex held events in Zhuhai, Guangdong Province, China and in Miami, Florida, USA, and received strategic investment from the US-based company GACP Sports. They continued with these two events in 2019 with Soccerex China in Haikou, Hainan Province, China in May and Soccerex USA in Miami, Florida, USA, adding Soccerex Europe to their portfolio in Oeiras, Portugal in September. These events were supported by key football stakeholders including the Asian Football Confederation (AFC) and Concacaf.

In 2020, the company announced their 2020 event plans, including Soccerex Europe returning in September to Oeiras, Portugal whilst Soccerex Americas will be based in Miami in November.

== Public events ==
In addition to corporate networking and exhibition functions, Soccerex has run Football Festivals alongside the Global Convention to promote community engagement. First held on the beach in Dubai, it grew to include youth tournaments, musical and dance acts and a legends tournament for ex-professional footballers.

It has been hosted in Dubai (2005–6), Johannesburg (2007–2009), Rio de Janeiro (2010–2013) and Manchester (2014–17).

The event was free to attend and has attracted stars including Eric Cantona, Cafu, Lucas Moura, Marcel Desailly, Gaizka Mendieta and Jay Jay Okocha and world-renowned freestylers such as Séan Garnier and Liv Cooke.

In 2016, the World's First International Street Soccer Tournament, World Street 3s was launched at Soccerex Football Festival. Eight teams, from Belgium, Denmark, England, Croatia, France, Netherlands, Italy and USA, took part in the inaugural competition.

The Dutch team of Edward Van Gils, Mohamed Attaibi, Issy ‘The Hitman’ Hamdoui and Sofian El Adel, demonstrated the footballing skills needed for the fast-paced action of street soccer, scoring over 25 goals throughout the tournament.

== Soccerexpert ==
In addition to the events it runs, Soccerex has a media suite under the name Soccerexpert.

The content is centred on football business news, analysis and interviews, with editorial pieces on global and regional football business issues as well as sections related to commercial deals which have been done.

Soccerexpert products are available online on the Soccerex website, multiple social media platforms and in an e-newsletter sent out via email.

== Market reports ==
In addition to the Soccerexpert series of publications, Soccerex produces annual football market reports such as the Soccerex Football Finance 100, a list of the world's most powerful clubs in financial terms, and the 20 Under 21s Report, a list with of the world's most valuable young players.

== Duncan Revie Award ==
In memory of Soccerex's Co-Founder Duncan Revie, who died in 2016, the company bestows an award with his name to global football industry figures that have made a great contribution to the development of football. Richard Tims of Sheffield FC, the world's oldest football club, was the first recipient; in 2017, the award was presented to the belated football player and coach legend Johan Cruyff; in 2018, former US Soccer Federation president, Alan Rothenberg collected the award at the Soccerex event in Miami; and in 2019, the award was presented to Major League Soccer commissioner, Don Garber.
