= Stefano Rossini =

Italian footballer (born 1971)

Personal information
- Full name: Stefano Rossini
- Date of birth: 2 February 1971 (age 55)
- Place of birth: Viadana, Italy
- Height: 1.83 m (6 ft 0 in)
- Position: Defender

Team information
- Current team: Piacenza (manager)

Senior career*
Years	Team	Apps	(Gls)
1987–1989	Parma	28	(0)
1989–1990	Internazionale	14	(0)
1990	Fiorentina	0	(0)
1991	Parma	7	(0)
1991–1992	Udinese	31	(0)
1992–1993	Internazionale	3	(0)
1993–1994	Udinese	18	(0)
1994–1996	Piacenza	60	(0)
1996–1997	Atalanta	25	(0)
1998	Lecce	25	(0)
1998–2001	Genoa	77	(2)
2001–2002	Ternana	24	(1)
2002–2003	Genoa	34	(0)
2003–2004	Como	27	(0)
2005–2006	Cremonese	36	(0)
2006–2007	Reggiana	18	(0)
2007–2008	Pizzighettone	3	(0)
2008–2009	Fidenza	25	(0)
2009–2010	ASD SBC Oltrepò		

International career
1989	Italy B	1	(0)

Managerial career
- 2015: Pavia (caretaker)
- 2016: Pavia (caretaker)
- 2017–2019: Vigor Carpaneto
- 2019–2020: Vigor Carpaneto
- 2021: Borgosesia
- 2022: Tritium
- 2022–2023: Nibianno&Valtidone
- 2023–2024: Piacenza
- 2024–: Piacenza
- * Club domestic league appearances and goals

Stefano Rossini (born 2 February 1971) is an Italian football manager and former player who played as a defender for numerous Italian clubs throughout his career. He is the manager of Serie D club Piacenza.

== Club career ==
=== Parma & Inter ===
Rossini started his career at Parma, who were at that time in Serie B. He joined Italian giant Internazionale in the summer of 1989, but after a poor season, he left for AC Fiorentina. He made no appearance for La Viola and left for his mother club Parma in November 1990 for their first ever Serie A season.

=== Between Serie A bottom clubs ===
In the next season, he left for Udinese, where he won Serie A promotion after finishing fourth in Serie B. He moved back to Internazionale in the 1992–93 season, but just played four games, including one in Coppa Italia.

He moved back to Udinese in 1993–94 season, where the club were relegated back to Serie B at the end of the season.

Rossini joined Piacenza in the summer of 1994, where he again won promotion to Serie A after finishing 1st in Serie B. After Piacenza finished just above the relegated clubs in the 1995–96 season, he left for Atalanta, who finished just above Piacenza in that season.

Rossini played with Atalanta until November 1997, when he left for newly promoted Serie A team Lecce. Lecce finished second from bottom and were relegated.

After playing once in Serie B for Lecce during the 1998–99 season, he left for Genoa C.F.C. of Serie B in October 1998.

=== Genoa & Serie B ===
Rossini played with Genoa from 1998 until 2001, then spent a season at Ternana in Serie B in the 2001–02 season. He returned to Genoa for the start of the 2002–03 season. In the summer of 2003, he joined Como, but Como finished bottom and were relegated to Serie C1. After six months without a club, he joined Cremonese of Serie C1 in January 2005, and won promotion to Serie B after finishing as champions. Cremonese were subsequently relegated in the summer of 2006.

=== Late career ===
Rossini joined Reggiana of Serie C2 in summer 2006. In January 2008, after spending 6 months unattached, he signed for Pizzighettone. He left the club at the end of the season, joining Fidenza in Serie D.

== International career ==
Rossini was a member of the Italian Olympic football team at the 1992 Summer Olympics.

== Coaching career ==
After retiring, Rossini was hired as a youth coach at Pavia. He was appointed as caretaker manager two times for the first team of Pavia, first time on 13 December 2015 and three days forward, and the second time from March 2016 until the end of the season. Rossini then left the club at the end of the 2015–16 season.

On 5 October 2017, Rossini was appointed as manager of ASD Vigor Carpaneto. He was fired from his position on 5 March 2019. On 7 October 2019, he was hired by Vigor Carpaneto once again.

On 1 November 2023, Rossini was hired as the new head coach of Serie D fallen giants Piacenza, replacing Massimo Maccarone. He was sacked by Piacenza in 2024 and replaced by Simone Bentivoglio but after one month he was re-hired.
