= 1987–88 Inter Milan season =

Inter Milan
1987–88 season
- Chairman: Ernesto Pellegrini
- Manager: Giovanni Trapattoni
- Serie A: 5th
- Coppa Italia: Semi-finals
- UEFA Cup: Round of 16
- Top goalscorer: League: Alessandro Altobelli (9); All: Alessandro Altobelli (16)
- Average home league attendance: 47,812
Home colours	Away colours
- All statistics correct as of 15 May 1988.

== Season ==
Fans thought of 1987 as a year zero, hoping in a revival from the club. Trapattoni managed to avoid the departures of Altobelli and Zenga while Nobile and Scifo arrived, in add to a return for Serena. Initial results were poor: Inter passed the preliminary stage of the Coppa Italia only due to goal difference, after have finished 4 out of 5 games from penalty spot (with an equal number of wins and losses). Rummenigge left Milan days before Italian league could start with a home loss (0–2) against Pescara, who gained his first win in Serie A on Inter's soil.

The side collected a goalless draw in the UEFA Cup with Beşiktaş, then beaten (3–1) in return match. The next continental opponent was Turun Palloseura, able to win at the San Siro with a single goal. After a 2–1 success over Juventus signed by Serena (former Bianconeri player), Inter also won the second leg. Inter was knocked out in the round of 16 by Espanyol with a 2–1 aggregate. Trapattoni's team managed to reach the semifinal of the domestic cup, but lost to Sampdoria. The Italian league, marked by losses in both citizen derbies, ended with a fifth place useful to get qualification for the UEFA Cup next season.

== Squad ==
Note: Flags indicate national team as defined under FIFA eligibility rules; some limited exceptions apply. Players may hold more than one non-FIFA nationality.

Pos.	Nation	Player
GK	ITA	Walter Zenga
GK	ITA	Astutillo Malgioglio
DF	ITA	Giuseppe Bergomi
DF	ITA	Giuseppe Baresi
DF	ITA	Riccardo Ferri
DF	ITA	Andrea Mandorlini
DF	ITA	Salvatore Nobile
DF	ITA	Fabio Calcaterra
DF	ARG	Daniel Passarella
MF	ITA	Alberto Rivolta
MF	ITA	Stefano Civeriati

Pos.	Nation	Player
MF	BEL	Enzo Scifo
MF	ITA	Gianfranco Matteoli
MF	ITA	Giuseppe Minaudo
MF	ITA	Adriano Piraccini
MF	ITA	Pietro Fanna
FW	ITA	Alessandro Altobelli
FW	ITA	Aldo Serena
FW	ITA	Dario Morello
FW	ITA	Massimo Ciocci
FW	ITA	Paolo Mandelli

=== Transfers ===
In
Pos.	Name	from	Type
MF	Vincenzo Scifo	Anderlecht	
DF	Gabriele Baraldi	Castanese	
DF	Salvatore Nobile	Lecce	
FW	Aldo Serena	Juventus	loan ended
GK	Gianni Marco Sansonetti	Messina	loan ended

Out
Pos.	Name	To	Type
FW	Karl-Heinz Rummenigge	Servette	
MF	Marco Tardelli	Saint Gallen	
DF	Luciano Marangon		retired
MF	Enrico Cucchi	Empoli	co-ownership
FW	Oliviero Garlini	Atalanta	
GK	Massimiliano Caniato	Licata	loan

== Competitions ==
=== Serie A ===
==== League table ====
Pos	Team	Pld	W	D	L	GF	GA	GD	Pts	Qualification or relegation
3	Roma	30	15	8	7	39	26	+13	38	Qualification to UEFA Cup
4	Sampdoria	30	13	11	6	41	30	+11	37	Qualification to Cup Winners' Cup
5	Internazionale	30	11	10	9	42	35	+7	32	Qualification to UEFA Cup
6	Juventus (Note: Juventus won the UEFA Cup qualification match against Torino 0–0*(4:2) then qualified to 1988–89 UEFA Cup.)	30	11	9	10	35	30	+5	31	Qualification to UEFA Cup
7	Torino	30	8	15	7	33	30	+3	31	

Source: 1987–88 Serie A, RSSSF.com
Rules for classification: 1) Points; 2) Head-to-head points; 3) Head-to-head goal difference; 4) Goal difference; 5) Goals scored; 6) Draw.

==== Position by round ====
Round	1	2	3	4	5	6	7	8	9	10	11	12	13	14	15	16	17	18	19	20	21	22	23	24	25	26	27	28	29	30
Ground	A	H	A	H	A	A	H	A	H	H	A	H	A	H	A	H	A	H	A	H	H	A	H	A	A	H	A	H	A	H
Result	L	W	W	D	D	W	L	D	L	D	W	L	D	W	W	D	W	D	L	D	L	W	L	W	L	W	L	W	D	D
Position	11	6	3	5	5	2	6	6	8	6	5	6	6	5	5	5	5	5	5	5	5	5	5	5	6	5	6	5	5	5

Source: Competitive matches
A = Away; H = Home; W = Win; D = Draw; L = Loss; = 1988–89 European Cup; = 1988–89 UEFA Cup; = Relegation to 1988–89 Serie B

==== Matches ====
13 September 1987 1	Inter	0–2	Pescara	Milan
16:00 CEST		Report	40' Galvani; 57' (pen.) Slišković	Stadium: Giuseppe Meazza; Referee: Sguizzato

20 September 1987 2	Como	1–2	Inter	Como
16:00 CEST	Albiero 78' (pen.)	Report	63' Passarella; 83' Altobelli	Stadium: Stadio Giuseppe Sinigaglia; Referee: Lanese

27 September 1987 3	Inter	2–0	Empoli	Milan
15:00 CET	Serena 72'; Altobelli 86'	Report		Stadium: Giuseppe Meazza; Referee: Coppetelli

4 October 1987 4	Torino	1–1	Inter	Turin
15:00 CET	G. Ferri 55'	Report	62' Matteoli	Stadium: Comunale; Referee: Agnolin

11 October 1987 5	Inter	1–1	Verona	Milan
15:00 CET	Scifo 83'	Report	62' Elkjær	Stadium: Giuseppe Meazza; Referee: D'Elia

25 October 1987 6	Inter	2–1	Juventus	Milan
14:30 CET	Serena 9', 73'	Report	51' De Agostini	Stadium: Giuseppe Meazza; Referee: Lanese

1 November 1987 7	Pisa	2–1	Inter	Pisa
14:30 CET	Bernazzani 7'; Dunga 60'	Report	64' Mandorlini	Stadium: Stadio Arena Garibaldi; Referee: Lo Bello

8 November 1987 8	Inter	2–2	Ascoli	Milan
14:30 CET	Passarella 16'; Serena 37'	Report	28' Carillo; 38' Dell'Oglio	Stadium: Giuseppe Meazza; Referee: Baldas (Trieste)

22 November 1987 9	Roma	3–2	Inter	Rome
14:30 CET	Manfredonia 15'; Giannini 19'; Desideri 84'	Report	13' Fanna; 89' (pen.) Altobelli	Stadium: Olimpico; Referee: Pairetto

29 November 1987 10	Inter	1–1	Napoli	Milan
14:30 CET	De Napoli 59' (o.g.)	Report	28' Careca	Stadium: Giuseppe Meazza; Referee: Longhi

13 December 1987 11	Fiorentina	1–2	Inter	Florence
14:30 CET	Berti 6'	Report	36' (pen.) Passarella; 84' Ciocci	Stadium: Stadio Comunale; Referee: Agnolin

20 December 1987 12	Inter	0–1	Milan	Milan
14:30 CET		Report	4' (o.g.) R. Ferri	Stadium: Giuseppe Meazza; Referee: Lanese

3 January 1988 13	Sampdoria	1–1	Inter	Genoa
14:30 CET	Mancini 58'	Report	8' R. Ferri	Stadium: Stadio Luigi Ferraris; Referee: Baldas

10 January 1988 14	Inter	2–0	Cesena	Milan
14:30 CET	Passarella 8'; Altobelli 20'	Report		Stadium: Giuseppe Meazza; Referee: Luci

17 January 1988 15	Avellino	1–3	Inter	Avellino
14:30 CET	Schachner 45' (pen.)	Report	27' Passarella; 36' Altobelli; 88' G. Baresi	Stadium: Stadio Partenio; Referee: Lo Bello

24 January 1988 16	Pescara	1–1	Inter	Pescara
14:30 CET	Slišković 34'	Report	39' Passarella	Stadium: Stadio Adriatico; Referee: Pezzella

31 January 1988 17	Inter	1–0	Como	Milan
15:00 CET	Serena 59'	Report		Stadium: Giuseppe Meazza; Referee: Bergamo

7 February 1988 18	Empoli	1–1	Inter	Empoli
15:00 CET	Lucci 71'	Report	9' Scifo	Stadium: Stadio Carlo Castellani; Referee: Longhi

14 February 1988 19	Inter	0–1	Torino	Milan
15:00 CET		Report	12' (pen.) Cravero	Stadium: Giuseppe Meazza; Referee: Paparesta

28 February 1988 20	Verona	1–1	Inter	Verona
15:00 CET	Fontolan 81'	Report	76' Scifo	Stadium: Stadio Marcantonio Bentegodi; Referee: Lo Bello

6 March 1988 21	Juventus	1–0	Inter	Turin
15:30 CET	Magrin 69' (pen.)	Report		Stadium: Stadio Comunale; Referee: Pezzella

13 March 1988 22	Inter	2–1	Pisa	Milan
15:30 CET	Altobelli 11'; Dolcetti 89' (o.g.)	Report	87' (pen.) Sclosa	Stadium: Giuseppe Meazza; Referee: Amendolia

20 March 1988 23	Ascoli	2–1	Inter	Ascoli Piceno
15:30 CET	Carillo 5'; Scarafoni 15'	Report	44' R. Ferri	Stadium: Stadio Cino e Lillo Del Duca; Referee: Lombardo

27 March 1988 24	Inter	4–2	Roma	Milan
15:30 CEST	Altobelli 13'; Bergomi 17'; Ciocci 30', 68'	Report	38' (pen.) Giannini; 45' (o.g.) Bergomi	Stadium: Giuseppe Meazza; Referee: Agnolin

10 April 1988 25	Napoli	1–0	Inter	Naples
15:30 CEST	Maradona 21'	Report		Stadium: San Paolo; Referee: Fabio Baldas

17 April 1988 26	Inter	3–0	Fiorentina	Milan
14:30 CEST	Minaudo 47'; Piraccini 84'; Ciocci 87'	Report		Stadium: Giuseppe Meazza; Referee: Di Cola

24 April 1988 27	Milan	2–0	Inter	Milan
15:30 CEST	Gullit 43'; Virdis 53'	Report		Stadium: Giuseppe Meazza; Referee: Longhi

1 May 1988 28	Inter	3–1	Sampdoria	Milan
16:00 CEST	Mandorlini 32'; Scifo 60'; Altobelli 79'	Report	85' Mannini	Stadium: Giuseppe Meazza; Referee: Coppetelli

8 May 1988 29	Cesena	2–2	Inter	Cesena
16:00 CEST	Bordin 73'; Lorenzo 76'	Report	42' (pen.) Altobelli; 60' Serena	Stadium: Stadio Dino Manuzzi; Referee: D'Elia

15 May 1988 30	Inter	1–1	Avellino	Milan
16:30 CEST	Minaudo 4'	Report	33' Gazzaneo	Stadium: Giuseppe Meazza; Referee: Baldas

=== Coppa Italia ===
First round

23 August 1987 1	Taranto	2–2 (5–3 p)	Inter	Taranto
CEST	De Vitis 20'; Dalla Costa 80'	Report	60' Piraccini; 68' Altobelli	Stadium: Stadio Erasmo Iacovone; Referee: Baldas
	Penalties
	Paolucci (penalty scored); Donatelli (penalty scored); Picci (penalty scored); Serra (penalty scored); Dalla Costa (penalty scored)		(penalty missed) G. Baresi; (penalty scored) Fanna; (penalty scored) Minaudo; (penalty scored) Altobelli

26 August 1987 2	Inter	4–1	Catania	Milan
20:30 CEST	Altobelli 46', 64', 87'; Passarella 68'	Report	43' (pen.) Garzieri	Stadium: Giuseppe Meazza; Referee: Cornieti

30 August 1987 3	Brescia	2–2 (4–2 p)	Inter	Brescia
CEST	Chiodini 79'; Branco 87' (pen.)	Report	26' Altobelli; 35' Matteoli	Stadium: Mario Rigamonti; Referee: D'Elia
	Penalties
	Branco (penalty missed); Bonometti (penalty scored); Mariani (penalty scored); Piovani (penalty scored); Beccalossi (penalty scored)		(penalty missed) Mandorlini; (penalty missed) Matteoli; (penalty scored) Altobelli; (penalty scored) R. Ferri

2 September 1987 4	Reggiana	0–0 (8–9 p)	Inter	Reggio nell'Emilia
CEST		Report		Stadium: Stadio Giglio; Referee: Agnolin
	Penalties
	Polverino (penalty scored); Cornacchini (penalty missed); Bellatorre (penalty scored); Poggi (penalty scored); D'Agostino (penalty scored); Dominissini (penalty scored); Albi (penalty scored); Perugi (penalty scored); De Agostini (penalty scored); Cornacchia (penalty missed)		(penalty scored) Passarella; (penalty scored) Mandorlini; (penalty scored) Fanna; (penalty scored) Scifo; (penalty missed) Altobelli; (penalty scored) R. Ferri; (penalty scored) Nobile; (penalty scored) G. Baresi; (penalty scored) Piraccini; (penalty scored) Zenga

6 September 1987 5	Inter	0–0 (5–4 p)	Ascoli	Milan
CEST		Report		Stadium: Stadio Giuseppe Meazza; Referee: Cornieti
	Penalties
	Fanna (penalty scored); Mandorlini (penalty scored); Altobelli (penalty scored); Scifo (penalty scored); Passarella (penalty scored)		(penalty missed) Casagrande; (penalty scored) Destro; (penalty scored) P. Giovannelli; (penalty scored) Carillo; (penalty scored) Greco

Eightfinals

6 January 1988	Bologna	1–3	Inter	Bologna
CET	Pecci 89'	Report	4', 15', 48' Fanna	Stadium: Stadio Renato Dall'Ara; Referee: D'Elia

20 January 1988	Inter	3–0	Bologna	Milan
CET	Serena 31', 79'; Ciocci 55'	Report		Stadium: Giuseppe Meazza; Referee: Nicchi

Quarterfinals

10 February 1988	Inter	2–1	Empoli	Milan
CET	Serena 1'; Lucci 69' (o.g.)	Report	31' Incocciati	Stadium: Giuseppe Meazza; Referee: Amendolia

2 March 1988	Empoli	0–1	Inter	Milan
CET		Report	53' R. Ferri	Stadium: Stadio Carlo Castellani; Referee: Lanese

Semifinals

6 April 1988	Inter	0–0	Sampdoria	Milan
CEST		Report		Stadium: Stadio Giuseppe Meazza; Referee: Lo Bello

20 April 1988	Sampdoria	1–0	Inter	Genoa
CEST	Mancini 25'	Report		Stadium: Stadio Luigi Ferraris; Referee: Lo Bello

=== UEFA Cup ===
16 September 1987	(Turkey) Beşiktaş	0–0	Inter	Istanbul
15:30 CEST		Report		Stadium: Stadio BJK İnönü; Attendance: 42 000; Referee: (East Germany) Peschel

30 September 1987	Inter	3–1	(Turkey) Beşiktaş	Milan
20:30 CET	Altobelli 37'; Serena 45', 87'	Report	15' Uçar	Stadium: Giuseppe Meazza; Attendance: 15 000; Referee: (France) Biguet

Round of 16

21 October 1987	Inter	0–1	(Finland) Turku PS	Milan
19:00 CET		Report	11' Aaltonen	Stadium: Giuseppe Meazza; Attendance: 20 000; Referee: (Republic of Ireland) Wallace

4 November 1987	(Finland) Turku PS	0–2	Inter	Turku
17:30 CET		Report	50' Scifo; 71' Altobelli	Stadium: Kupittaan jalkapallostadion Attendance: 13 375; Referee: (Poland) Ekaztajn

Eightfinals

25 November 1987	Inter	1–1	(Spain) Espanyol	Milan
20:30 CET	Serena 39'	Report	80' Lauridsen	Stadium: Giuseppe Meazza; Attendance: 40 000; Referee: (Austria) Wöhrer

9 December 1987	(Spain) Espanyol	1–0 (2–1 agg.)	Inter	Barcelona
21:15 CET	Orejuela 23'	Report		Stadium: Estadio de Sarriá; Attendance: 30 000; Referee: (West Germany) Pauly

== Statistics ==
=== Players statistics ===
Appearances and goals in domestic league.

No.	Pos	Nat	Player	Total		Serie A		Coppa		UEFA	
No.	Pos	Nat	Player	Apps	Goals	Apps	Goals	Apps	Goals	Apps	Goals
	GK	(Italy) ITA	Walter Zenga	43	-41	26	-31	11	-6	6	-4
	DF	(Italy) ITA	Giuseppe Bergomi	42	1	28	1	9	0	5	0
	DF	(Italy) ITA	Giuseppe Baresi	46	1	29	1	11	0	6	0
	DF	(Argentina) ARG	Daniel Passarella	35	7	21	6	8	1	6	0
	DF	(Italy) ITA	Ricardo Ferri	40	3	25	2	10	1	5	0
	MF	(Italy) ITA	Pietro Fanna	44	4	26+2	1	11	3	5	0
	MF	(Italy) ITA	Andrea Mandorlini	44	2	27	2	11	0	6	0
	MF	(Italy) ITA	Gianfranco Matteoli	35	2	16+5	1	9	1	5	0
	MF	(Belgium) BEL	Vincenzo Scifo	44	5	28	4	10	0	6	1
	FW	(Italy) ITA	Alessandro Altobelli	44	16	27+1	9	10	5	6	2
	FW	(Italy) ITA	Aldo Serena	31	12	21+1	6	4	3	5	3
	GK	(Italy) ITA	Astutillo Malgioglio	6	-4	4	-4	2	-0	0	-0
	DF	(Italy) ITA	Salvatore Nobile	31	0	16+3	0	8	0	4	0
	FW	(Italy) ITA	Massimo Ciocci	35	5	12+10	4	10	1	3	0
	MF	(Italy) ITA	Adriano Piraccini	37	2	10+13	1	10	1	4	0
	MF	(Italy) ITA	Giuseppe Minaudo	20	2	7+8	2	5	0	0	0
	DF	(Italy) ITA	Fabio Calcaterra	20	0	7+5	0	5	0	3	0
	MF	(Italy) ITA	Dario Morello	1	0	1	0	0	0	0	0
	DF	(Italy) ITA	Rivolta	1	0	1	0	0	0	0	0
	GK	(Italy) ITA	Sansonetti	0	0	0	0				
	MF	(Italy) ITA	De Vincenzo	0	0	0	0				
	DF	(Italy) ITA	Stafico	0	0	0	0				

- Source: http://calcio-seriea.net/presenze/1987/954/

== Sources ==
- RSSSF – Italy 1987/88
