= 1986–87 Inter Milan season =

Internazionale
1986–87 season
- Chairman: Ernesto Pellegrini
- Manager: Giovanni Trapattoni
- Stadium: Giuseppe Meazza
- Serie A: 3rd
- Coppa Italia: Quarter-finals
- UEFA Cup: Quarter-finals
- Top goalscorer: League: Alessandro Altobelli (11); All: Altobelli (19)
Home colours	Away colours
- All statistics correct as of May 17, 1987.

== Season summary ==
Longing for redemption after a 5–years title absence, Inter bet on Giovanni Trapattoni, winner of 6 Scudetti sitting on Juventus' bench. 1986 summer also brought in Milan players such as Daniel Passarella and Gianfranco Matteoli. Autumnal results presented Inter like a competitive team, at least Rummenigge had to give up due to injuries. Trapattoni had already reach UEFA Cup's quarter-finals where he met Goteborg drawing (without goals) the first leg. It forced Inter to win the second but, after gaining the 1–0 with an own goal, team took the equalizer: away goals rule caused Swedish's victory. Season ended with a third place, behind Napoli and coach's former club.

== Squad ==
Note: Flags indicate national team as defined under FIFA eligibility rules; some limited exceptions apply. Players may hold more than one non-FIFA nationality.

Pos.	Nation	Player
GK	ITA	Walter Zenga
GK	ITA	Astutillo Malgioglio
DF	ITA	Giuseppe Bergomi
DF	ITA	Giuseppe Baresi
DF	ITA	Riccardo Ferri
DF	ITA	Andrea Mandorlini
DF	ITA	Corrado Verdelli
DF	ITA	Fabio Calcaterra
DF	ARG	Daniel Passarella
DF	ITA	Luciano Marangon
MF	ITA	Gianfranco Matteoli

Pos.	Nation	Player
MF	ITA	Alberto Rivolta
MF	ITA	Giuseppe Minaudo
MF	ITA	Adriano Piraccini
MF	ITA	Enrico Cucchi
MF	ITA	Marco Tardelli
MF	ITA	Pietro Fanna
MF	ITA	Massimo Pellegrini
FW	ITA	Alessandro Altobelli
FW	FRG	Karl-Heinz Rummenigge
FW	ITA	Massimo Ciocci
FW	ITA	Oliviero Garlini

=== Transfers ===
In
Pos.	Name	from	Type
DF	Daniel Passarella	Fiorentina	
MF	Gianfranco Matteoli	Sampdoria	
MF	Adriano Piraccini	AS Bari	
GK	Astutillo Malgioglio	SS Lazio	
DF	Fabio Calcaterra	SS Lazio	loan ended
FW	Oliviero Garlini	SS Lazio	
MF	Giuseppe Accardi	Cavese	
MF	Stefano Civeriati	Pavia	loan ended

Out
Pos.	Name	To	Type
MF	Liam Brady	Ascoli	
MF	Giampiero Marini		retired
GK	Fabrizio Lorieri	Torino	
DF	Daniele Bernazzani	Pisa	
MF	Carmine Nunziata	Alzano Virescit	loan
FW	Franco Selvaggi	Sambenedettese	

== Competitions ==
=== Serie A ===
==== League table ====
Pos	Team	Pld	W	D	L	GF	GA	GD	Pts	Qualification or relegation
1	Napoli (C)	30	15	12	3	41	21	+20	42	Qualification to European Cup
2	Juventus	30	14	11	5	42	27	+15	39	Qualification to UEFA Cup
3	Inter Milan	30	15	8	7	32	17	+15	38	Qualification to UEFA Cup
4	Hellas Verona	30	12	12	6	36	25	+11	36	Qualification to UEFA Cup
5	Milan (Note: Milan won the UEFA Cup qualification match against Sampdoria 1–0, thus qualifying for the 1987–88 UEFA Cup.)	30	13	9	8	31	21	+10	35	Qualification to UEFA Cup

Source: 1986–87 Serie A, RSSSF.com
Rules for classification: 1) Points; 2) Head-to-head points; 3) Head-to-head goal difference; 4) Goal difference; 5) Goals scored; 6) Draw. (Note: Head-to-head record is used only after all the matches between the teams in question have been played).
(C) Champions

==== Position by round ====
Round	1	2	3	4	5	6	7	8	9	10	11	12	13	14	15	16	17	18	19	20	21	22	23	24	25	26	27	28	29	30
Ground	A	H	A	H	A	A	H	A	H	H	A	H	A	H	A	H	A	H	A	H	H	A	H	A	A	H	A	H	A	H
Result	L	W	D	W	D	W	D	D	W	D	D	W	W	W	L	W	W	W	L	L	L	W	W	D	W	W	W	L	L	D
Position	10	6	7	4	4	3	3	3	2	3	2	2	2	1	2	2	2	2	2	3	5	3	3	2	2	2	2	2	2	3

Source: Competitive matches
A = Away; H = Home; W = Win; D = Draw; L = Loss; = 1987–88 European Cup; = 1987–88 UEFA Cup

==== Matches ====
14 September 1986 1	Empoli	1–0	Inter Milan	Empoli
	Osio 37'	Report

21 September 1986 2	Inter Milan	4–0	Brescia	Milan
	Rummenigge 4', 32'; Altobelli 58' (pen.); Giorgi 77' (o.g.)	Report		Stadium: Giuseppe Meazza

28 September 1986 3	Udinese	0–0	Inter Milan	Udine
		Report		Stadium: Friuli

5 October 1986 4	Inter Milan	4–1	Roma	Milan
	Garlini 5'; Altobelli 58', 67', 81'	Report	Pruzzo 69' (pen.)	Stadium: Giuseppe Meazza

12 October 1986 5	AC Milan	0–0	Inter Milan	Milan
		Report		Stadium: San Siro

19 October 1986 6	Inter Milan	1–0	Sampdoria	Milan
	Passarella 66' (pen.)	Report		Stadium: Giuseppe Meazza

26 October 1986 7	Juventus	1–1	Inter Milan	Turin
	Ferri 8' (o.g.)	Report	Altobelli 49'	Stadium: Comunale

2 November 1986 8	Napoli	0–0	Inter Milan	Naples
		Report		Stadium: San Paolo

9 November 1986 9	Inter Milan	2–1	Torino	Milan
	Altobelli 5', 47'	Report	Dossena 73'	Stadium: Giuseppe Meazza

23 November 1986 10	Como	1–1	Inter Milan	Como
	Matteoli 3' (o.g.)	Report	Fanna 24'	Stadium: Giuseppe Sinigaglia

30 November 1986 11	Inter Milan	0–0	Avellino	Milan
		Report		Stadium: Giuseppe Meazza

14 December 1986 12	Fiorentina	0–1	Inter Milan	Florence
		Report	Passarella 46'	Stadium: Comunale

21 December 1986 13	Inter Milan	3–0	Ascoli	Milan
	Altobelli 24'; Rummenigge 31'; Baresi 88'	Report		Stadium: Giuseppe Meazza

4 January 1987 14	Inter Milan	1–0	Atalanta	Milan
	Fanna 18'	Report		Stadium: Giuseppe Meazza

11 January 1987 15	Verona	2–1	Inter Milan	Verona
	Elkjær 40', 88'	Report	Altobelli 32'	Stadium: Marcantonio Bentegodi

18 January 1987 16	Inter Milan	2–1	Empoli	Milan
	Matteoli 41'; Mandorlini 70'	Report	Ekström 90'	Stadium: Giuseppe Meazza

1 February 1987 17	Brescia	0–1	Inter Milan	Brescia
		Report	Passarella 13'	Stadium: Mario Rigamonti

8 February 1987 18	Inter Milan	2–0	Udinese	Milan
	Garlini 60'; Altobelli 88'	Report		Stadium: Giuseppe Meazza

22 February 1987 19	Roma	1–0	Inter Milan	Rome
	Berggreen 30'	Report		Stadium: Olimpico

1 March 1987 20	Inter Milan	1–2	AC Milan	Milan
	F. Baresi 26' (o.g.)	Report	Galderisi 53'; Virdis 85'	Stadium: Giuseppe Meazza

8 March 1987 21	Sampdoria	3–1	Inter Milan	Genoa
	Briegel 10'; Mancini 76' (pen.); Lorenzo 90'	Report	Garlini 57'	Stadium: Luigi Ferraris

15 March 1987 22	Inter Milan	2–1	Juventus	Milan
	Fanna 42'; Garlini 75'	Report	Serena 88'	Stadium: Giuseppe Meazza

22 March 1987 23	Inter Milan	1–0	Napoli	Milan
	Bergomi 85'	Report		Stadium: Giuseppe Meazza

29 March 1987 24	Torino	0–0	Inter Milan	Turin
		Report		Stadium: Comunale

5 April 1987 25	Inter Milan	1–0	Como	Milan
	Bergomi 52'	Report		Stadium: Giuseppe Meazza

12 April 1987 26	Avellino	0–1	Inter Milan	Avellino
		Report	Altobelli 65'	Stadium: Partenio

26 April 1987 27	Inter Milan	1–0	Fiorentina	Milan
	Ciocci 72'	Report		Stadium: Giuseppe Meazza

3 May 1987 28	Ascoli	1–0	Inter Milan	Ascoli Piceno
	Agostini 41'	Report		Stadium: Cino e Lillo Del Duca

10 May 1987 29	Atalanta	1–0	Inter Milan	Bergamo
	Ferri 36' (o.g.)	Report		Stadium: Comunale

17 May 1987 30	Inter Milan	0–0	Verona	Milan
		Report		Stadium: Giuseppe Meazza

=== Coppa Italia ===
First Round

24 August 1986 1	Cavese	1–3	Inter Milan	Cava de' Tirreni
	Passarella 71' (o.g.)		20' Ferri; 74' Rummenigge; 90' (pen.) Altobelli	Stadium: Stadio Simonetta Lamberti; Referee: Paparesta

27 August 1986 2	Catania	1–4	Inter Milan	Catania
	Borghi 40'		10' Passarella; 35' Piraccini; 60' Rummenigge; 75' Altobelli	Stadium: Stadio Angelo Massimino; Referee: Pieri

31 August 1986 3	Inter Milan	4–1	Catanzaro	Milan
	Altobelli 9'; Passarella 36' (pen.), 67'; Fanna 60'		55' (pen.) Chiarella	Stadium: Stadio Giuseppe Meazza; Referee: Leni (Perugia)

3 September 1986 4	Bologna	1–1	Inter Milan	Bologna
	Marocchi 43'		50' Matteoli	Stadium: Stadio Renato Dall'Ara; Referee: Agnolin

7 September 1986 5	Inter Milan	2–1	Udinese	Milan
	Passarella 31' (pen.); Altobelli 81' (pen.)		8' Zanone	Stadium: Stadio Giuseppe Meazza; Referee: Coppetelli

Eightfinals

25 February 1987	Empoli	0–2	Inter Milan	Empoli
			15' Altobelli; 82' Fanna	Stadium: Stadio Carlo Castellani; Referee: Coppetelli

8 April 1987	Inter Milan	1–0	Empoli	Milan
	Tardelli 88'			Stadium: Giuseppe Meazza; Referee: Cornieti

Quarterfinals

29 April 1987	Cremonese	1–1	Inter Milan	Cremona
	Lombardo 30'		82' Mandorlini	Stadium: Giovanni Zini; Referee: Bergamo

6 May 1987	Inter Milan	1–1 (3–5 p)	Cremonese	Milan
	Ciocci 51'		8' Bongiorni	Stadium: Stadio Giuseppe Meazza; Referee: Baldas
	Penalties
	Mandorlini (penalty scored); Matteoli (penalty missed); Baresi (penalty scored); Garlini (penalty missed)		(penalty scored) Nicoletti; (penalty scored) Bongiorni; (penalty scored) Citterio; (penalty scored) Lombardo

=== UEFA Cup ===
First round

17 September 1986	Inter Milan	2–0	(Greece) AEK Athens	Milan
	Altobelli 56'; Rummenigge 78'			Stadium: Giuseppe Meazza; Attendance: 50 000; Referee: (Belgium) Van Langenhove

2 October 1986	(Greece) AEK Athens	0–1	Inter Milan	Athens
			8' Passarella	Stadium: Athens Olympic Stadium; Attendance: 45000; Referee: (Sweden) Eriksson

Second round

22 October 1986	(Poland) Legia Warsaw	3–2	Inter Milan	Warsaw
	Sikorski 41'; Dziekanowski 57'; Karaś 60'		17' Altobelli; 75' (o.g.) Arceusz	Stadium: Stadion Dziesięciolecia Manifestu Lipcowego; Attendance: 20 000; Referee: (Spain) Perez

5 November 1986	Inter Milan	1–0	(Poland) Legia Warsaw	Milan
	Fanna 44'			Stadium: Giuseppe Meazza; Attendance: 48 957; Referee: (England) Courtney

Eightfinals

26 November 1986	(Czechoslovakia) Dukla Prague	0–1	Inter Milan	Prague
			17' Altobelli	Stadium: Na Julisce; Attendance: 30 000; Referee: (Germany) Tritschler

17 December 1986	Inter Milan	0–0	(Czechoslovakia) Dukla Prague	Milan
				Stadium: Giuseppe Meazza; Attendance: 20 683; Referee: (France) Quiniou

Quarterfinals

4 March 1987	(Sweden) IFK Goteborg	0–0	Inter Milan	Gothenburg
18:55 CET				Stadium: Gamla Ullevi; Attendance: 43 103; Referee: (Netherlands) Keizer

18 March 1987	Inter Milan	1–1 (1–1a agg.)	(Sweden) IFK Goteborg	Milan
20:45 CET	Fredriksson 58' (o.g.)		79' Pettersson	Stadium: Giuseppe Meazza; Attendance: 61 316; Referee: (West Germany) Prokop

== Statistics ==
=== Team statistics ===
Competition	Record							
Competition	M	W	D	L	GF	GA	GD	Win %
Serie A	30	15	8	7	32	17	+15	50.00
Coppa Italia	9	6	3	0	18	7	+11	66.67
UEFA Cup	8	4	3	1	8	4	+4	50.00
Total	47	25	14	8	58	28	+30	53.19

=== Players statistics ===
Appearances and goals in league.

No.	Pos	Nat	Player	Total		Serie A		Coppa		UEFA	
No.	Pos	Nat	Player	Apps	Goals	Apps	Goals	Apps	Goals	Apps	Goals
	GK	(Italy) ITA	Walter Zenga	46	-27	29	-16	9	-7	8	-4
	DF	(Italy) ITA	Giuseppe Bergomi	45	2	28	2	9	0	8	0
	DF	(Italy) ITA	Giuseppe Baresi	43	1	29	1	6	0	8	0
	DF	(Argentina) ARG	Daniel Passarella	38	8	23	3	8	4	7	1
	DF	(Italy) ITA	Riccardo Ferri	45	2	30	0	8	1	7	1
	DF	(Italy) ITA	Andrea Mandorlini	45	2	29+1	1	8	1	7	0
	MF	(Italy) ITA	Marco Tardelli	37	1	14+10	0	7	1	6	0
	MF	(Italy) ITA	Gianfranco Matteoli	47	2	30	1	9	1	8	0
	MF	(Italy) ITA	Adriano Piraccini	43	1	27+1	0	9	1	6	0
	MF	(Italy) ITA	Pietro Fanna	43	6	28	3	9	2	6	1
	FW	(Italy) ITA	Alessandro Altobelli	43	19	28	11	7	5	8	3
	GK	(Italy) ITA	Astutillo Malgioglio	1	-1	1	-1	0	0	0	0
	FW	(Italy) ITA	Oliviero Garlini	30	4	14+6	4	5	0	5	0
	FW	(West Germany) FRG	Karl-Heinz Rummenigge	24	6	14	3	5	2	5	1
	DF	(Italy) ITA	Fabio Calcaterra	22	0	3+11	0	3	0	5	0
	FW	(Italy) ITA	Massimo Ciocci	6	2	2+2	1	2	1	0	0
	DF	(Italy) ITA	Luciano Marangon	6	0	1+2	0	3	0	0	0
	MF	(Italy) ITA	Enrico Cucchi	21	0	0+13	0	7	0	1	0
	MF	(Italy) ITA	Giuseppe Minaudo	4	0	0+1	0	2	0	1	0
	DF	(Italy) ITA	Corrado Verdelli	2	0	0	0	2	0	0	0
	MF	(Italy) ITA	Alberto Rivolta								
	MF	(Italy) ITA	Massimo Pellegrini								

- Source: http://calcio-seriea.net/presenze/1986/935/

== Sources ==
- RSSSF - Italy 1986/87
