= 1985–86 Inter Milan season =

Inter Milan
1985–86 season
- Chairman: Ernesto Pellegrini
- Manager: Ilario Castagner; Mario Corso
- Serie A: 6th
- Coppa Italia: Quarter-finals
- UEFA Cup: Semi-finals
- Top goalscorer: League: Karl-Heinz Rummenigge (13); All: Alessandro Altobelli (19)
Home colours	Away colours
- All statistics correct as of 21 May 1986.

== Season ==
Inter could line-up notable attacking players, such as the new Fanna in add to Altobelli and Rummenigge. Despite his good performances in Europe the Italian league was disappointed, forcing the club to replace Castagner with Mario Corso.

The coach, renamed God's left foot, was not able to get more a sixth position but reached the semi-finals of UEFA Cup, being defeated by Real Madrid for the second time in row. The side could take part to European cups for 1986–87 season only thank to the fact that Roma won Coppa Italia, leaving a spot for UEFA Cup.

== Squad ==
Note: Flags indicate national team as defined under FIFA eligibility rules; some limited exceptions apply. Players may hold more than one non-FIFA nationality.

No.	Pos.	Nation	Player
—	GK	ITA	Walter Zenga
—	GK	ITA	Fabrizio Lorieri
—	DF	ITA	Giuseppe Baresi
—	DF	ITA	Giuseppe Bergomi
—	DF	ITA	Riccardo Ferri
—	DF	ITA	Fulvio Collovati
—	DF	ITA	Andrea Mandorlini
—	DF	ITA	Luciano Marangon
—	DF	ITA	Daniele Bernazzani
—	MF	ITA	Alberto Rivolta
—	MF	ITA	Giuseppe Minaudo

No.	Pos.	Nation	Player
—	MF	ITA	Enrico Cucchi
—	MF	ITA	Marco Tardelli
—	MF	ITA	Giampiero Marini
—	MF	IRL	Liam Brady
—	MF	ITA	Pietro Fanna
—	MF	ITA	Massimo Pellegrini
—	FW	ITA	Alessandro Altobelli
—	FW	FRG	Karl-Heinz Rummenigge
—	FW	ITA	Massimo Ciocci
—	FW	ITA	Paolo Mandelli
—	FW	ITA	Franco Selvaggi

=== Transfers ===
In
Pos.	Name	from	Type
GK	Fabrizio Lorieri	Piacenza	
DF	Daniele Bernazani	Pisa SC	
DF	Luciano Marangon	Hellas Verona FC	
MF	Pietro Fanna	Hellas Verona FC	
MF	Marco Tardelli	Juventus	
FW	Franco Selvaggi	Udinese Calcio	
MF	Evaristo Beccalossi	Sampdoria	
MF	Hansi Müller	Como	loan ended
FW	Juary	Cremonese	loan ended
FW	Aldo Serena	Torino	

Out
Pos.	Name	To	Type
GK	Angelo Recchi	Ancona Calcio	
DF	Graziano Bini	Genoa CFC	
MF	Franco Causio	US Lecce	
MF	Giancarlo Pasinato	Ascoli	
MF	Antonio Sabato	Torino	
FW	Carlo Muraro	Arezzo	
MF	Hansi Müller	Wacker Innsbruck	
FW	Juary	FC Porto	
FW	Aldo Serena	Juventus	loan

== Competitions ==
=== Serie A ===
==== League table ====
Pos	Team	Pld	W	D	L	GF	GA	GD	Pts	Qualification or relegation
4	Torino	30	11	11	8	31	26	+5	33	Qualification to UEFA Cup
5	Fiorentina	30	10	13	7	29	23	+6	33	Qualification to UEFA Cup
6	Internazionale	30	12	8	10	36	33	+3	32	Qualification to UEFA Cup
7	Milan	30	10	11	9	26	24	+2	31	
8	Atalanta	30	7	15	8	27	26	+1	29	

Source: RSSSF.com
Rules for classification: 1) Points; 2) Head-to-head points; 3) Head-to-head goal difference; 4) Goal difference; 5) Goals scored; 6) Draw. (Note: Head-to-head record is used only after all the matches between the teams in question have been played).

==== Results by round ====
Round	1	2	3	4	5	6	7	8	9	10	11	12	13	14	15	16	17	18	19	20	21	22	23	24	25	26	27	28	29	30
Ground	H	A	H	A	H	A	H	A	H	A	H	A	H	A	H	H	A	H	A	H	A	H	A	H	A	H	A	H	A	H
Result	W	L	W	D	D	W	W	W	L	D	D	D	D	L	W	L	L	L	W	D	W	W	L	W	L	L	W	L	W	D
Position	1	6	3	6	6	3	3	2	3	3	2	3	3	4	3	4	7	7	6	6	5	4	5	5	5	6	5	6	4	6

Source: http://calcio-seriea.net/allenatori_squadra/1985/903/
A = Away; H = Home; W = Win; D = Draw; L = Loss; = 1986–87 European Cup; = 1986–87 UEFA Cup; = Relegation to 1986–87 Serie B

==== Matches ====
8 September 1985 1	Inter Milan	3–1	Pisa	Milan
	Bergomi 55'; Rummenigge 73', 75'	Report	Arminese 44'	Stadium: Giuseppe Meazza

15 September 1985 2	Atalanta	2–1	Inter Milan	Bergamo
	Cantarutti 8'; Peters 78'	Report	Gentile 48' (o.g.)	Stadium: Atleti Azzurri d'Italia

22 September 1985 3	Inter Milan	3–1	Avellino	Milan
	Rummenigge 46', 60'; Altobelli 88'	Report	Ferri 62' (o.g.)	Stadium: Giuseppe Meazza

29 September 1985 4	Udinese	1–1	Inter Milan	Udine
	Carnevale 52'	Report	Rummenigge 1'	Stadium: Friuli

6 October 1985 5	Inter Milan	0–0	Verona	Milan
		Report		Stadium: Giuseppe Meazza

13 October 1985 6	Bari	1–3	Inter Milan	Bari
	Loseto 40'	Report	Tardelli 64'; Rummenigge 79'; Baresi 84'

20 October 1985 7	Lecce	0–1	Inter Milan	Lecce
		Report	Cucchi 11'	Stadium: Via del Mare

27 October 1985 8	Inter Milan	2–1	Roma	Milan
	Altobelli 24'; Rummenigge 67'	Report	Boniek 79'	Stadium: Giuseppe Meazza

3 November 1985 9	Fiorentina	3–0	Inter Milan	Florence
	Passarella 27' (pen.), 47'; Berti 45'	Report		Stadium: Comunale

10 November 1985 10	Inter Milan	1–1	Napoli	Milan
	Brady 73' (pen.)	Report	Maradona 49'	Stadium: Giuseppe Meazza

24 November 1985 11	Inter Milan	1–1	Juventus	Milan
	Bergomi 1'	Report	Platini 52'	Stadium: Giuseppe Meazza

1 December 1985 12	AC Milan	2–2	Inter Milan	Milan
	P. Rossi 5', 69'	Report	Altobelli 25'; Brady 65'	Stadium: San Siro

8 December 1985 13	Inter Milan	3–3	Torino	Milan
	Brady 21' (pen.); Rummenigge 55'; Bergomi 75'	Report	Comi 34'; Pusceddu 44'; Schachner 64'	Stadium: Giuseppe Meazza

15 December 1985 14	Como	1–0	Inter Milan	Como
	Borgonovo 30'	Report

22 December 1985 15	Inter Milan	1–0	Sampdoria	Milan
	Bergomi 9'	Report		Stadium: Giuseppe Meazza

5 January 1986 16	Pisa	1–0	Inter Milan	Pisa
	Baldieri 60'	Report

12 January 1986 17	Inter Milan	1–3	Atalanta	Milan
	Rummenigge 83' (pen.)	Report	Simonini 13', 23'; Soldà 60' (pen.)	Stadium: Giuseppe Meazza

19 January 1986 18	Avellino	1–0	Inter Milan	Avellino
	Benedetti 78'	Report

26 January 1986 19	Inter Milan	2–1	Udinese	Milan
	Bergomi 50'; Rummenigge 73'	Report	Carnevale 9'	Stadium: Giuseppe Meazza

9 February 1986 20	Hellas Verona	0–0	Inter Milan	Verona
		Report

16 February 1986 21	Inter Milan	1–0	Bari	Milan
	Altobelli 69'	Report		Stadium: Giuseppe Meazza

23 February 1986 22	Inter Milan	3–0	Lecce	Milan
	Tardelli 55'; Rummenigge 75', 83'	Report		Stadium: Giuseppe Meazza

2 March 1986 23	Roma	3–1	Inter Milan	Rome
	Graziani 23', 33'; Gerolin 84'	Report	Rummenigge 61'	Stadium: Olimpico

9 March 1986 24	Inter Milan	2–0	Fiorentina	Milan
	Altobelli 28', 73'	Report		Stadium: Giuseppe Meazza

16 March 1986 25	Napoli	1–0	Inter Milan	Naples
	Maradona 71' (pen.)	Report		Stadium: San Paolo

23 March 1986 26	Juventus	2–0	Inter Milan	Turin
	Platini 41' (pen.); Bonini 85'	Report	35' Rummennigge	Stadium: Comunale

6 April 1986 27	Inter Milan	1–0	AC Milan	Milan
	Minaudo 87'	Report		Stadium: Giuseppe Meazza

13 April 1986 28	Torino	1–0	Inter Milan	Turin
	Comi 67'	Report		Stadium: Comunale

20 April 1986 29	Inter Milan	3–2	Como	Milan
	Altobelli 31', 51', 69'	Report	Albieri 39' (pen.); Notaristefano 87'	Stadium: Giuseppe Meazza

27 April 1986 30	Sampdoria	0–0	Inter Milan	Genoa
		Report		Stadium: Luigi Ferraris

=== UEFA Cup ===
First round

18 September 1985	Inter Milan	5–1	(Switzerland) Saint Gallen	Milan
	Altobelli 9'; Marangon 36'; Mandorlini 45'; Rummenigge 61', 86'		72' Pellegrini	Stadium: Giuseppe Meazza; Attendance: 35 457; Referee: (Greece) Koukoulakis

2 October 1985	(Switzerland) Saint Gallen	0–0	Inter Milan	Saint-Gallen
				Stadium: Espenmoos; Attendance: 17 000; Referee: (France) Bouillet

Second round

23 October 1985	(Austria) LASK Linz	1–0	Inter Milan	Linz
	Gröss 81'			Stadium: Linzer Stadion; Attendance: 18 500; Referee: (Belgium) Costantin

6 November 1985	Inter Milan	4–0	(Austria) LASK Linz	Milan
	Brady 20' (pen.); Altobelli 34', 80', 81'			Stadium: Giuseppe Meazza; Attendance: 42 856; Referee: (Soviet Union) Miminoshvili

Eightfinals

27 November 1985	Inter Milan	0–0	(Poland) Legia Warsaw	Milan
				Stadium: Giuseppe Meazza; Attendance: 33 965; Referee: (Germany) Prokop

11 December 1985	(Poland) Legia Warsaw	0–1	Inter Milan	Warsaw
			108' Fanna	Stadium: Stadion Dziesięciolecia Manifestu Lipcowego; Attendance: 42 856; Referee: (Sweden) Eriksson

Quarterfinals

5 March 1986	Inter Milan	3–0	(France) Nantes	Milan
	Le Roux 13' (o.g.); Tardelli 62'; Rummenigge 79'			Stadium: Giuseppe Meazza; Attendance: 50 000; Referee: (Scotland) McGinlay

19 March 1986	(France) Nantes	3–3	Inter Milan	Nantes
	Der Zakarian 9'; Halilhodžić 37'; Le Roux 42'		33', 64' Altobelli; 59' (pen.) Brady	Stadium: Stade della Beaujoire; Referee: (Czech Republic) Galler

Semifinals

2 April 1986	Inter Milan	3–1	(Spain) Real Madrid	Milan
	Tardelli 1', 54'; Salguero 89' (o.g.)		87' Valdano	Stadium: Stadio Giuseppe Meazza; Attendance: 85 000; Referee: (Sweden) Fredriksson

16 April 1986	(Spain) Real Madrid	5–1 (6–4 agg.)	Inter Milan	Madrid
	Sánchez 44' (pen.), 74' (pen.); Gordillo 63'; Santillana 94', 107'		66' (pen.) Brady	Stadium: Santiago Bernabéu; Attendance: 90 000; Referee: (Netherlands) Keizer

=== Coppa Italia ===
Group phase

21 August 1985 1	Cesena	0–0	Inter Milan	Cesena
				Stadium: Stadio Dino Manuzzi; Referee: Lanese

25 August 1985 2	Inter Milan	3–1	Brescia Calcio	Milano
	Tardelli 7'; Fanna 9'; Marangon 32'		82' (pen.) Gritti	Stadium: Giuseppe Meazza; Referee: Pezzella

28 August 1985 3	Empoli	1–1	Inter Milan	Florence
	Cecconi 56' (pen.)		76' (pen.) Brady	Stadium: Comunale; Referee: Pieri

1 September 1985 4	Ancona Calcio	1–4	Inter Milan	Ancona
	Moro 55'		21', 41', 81' (pen.) Altobelli; 38' Rummenigge	Stadium: Dorico; Referee: Sguizzato

4 September 1985 5	Inter Milan	3–1	Avellino	Milan
	Rummenigge 20'; Fanna 41'; Altobelli 60'		51' A.Bertoni	Stadium: Giuseppe Meazza; Referee: Paparesta

Eightfinals

12 February 1986	Padova	1–2	Inter Milan	Padua
	Valigi 55'		64' (o.g.) Seno; 79' Collovati	Stadium: Stadio Euganeo; Referee: Testa

26 February 1986	Inter Milan	2–1	Padova	Milan
	Tardelli 26'; Fanna 41'		51' Coppola	Stadium: Giuseppe Meazza; Referee: Bruschini

Quarterfinals

7 May 1986	A.S. Roma	2–0	Inter Milan	Rome
	Desideri 18' (pen.); Tovalieri 29'			Stadium: Olimpico; Referee: Agnolin

21 May 1986	Inter Milan	2–1	A.S. Roma	Milano
	Brady 16' (pen.); Mandelli 75'		44' Giannini	Stadium: Stadio Giuseppe Meazza; Referee: Lo Bello

== Statistics ==
=== Players statistics ===
No.	Pos	Nat	Player	Total		Serie A		Coppa		UEFA	
No.	Pos	Nat	Player	Apps	Goals	Apps	Goals	Apps	Goals	Apps	Goals
	GK	(Italy) ITA	Walter Zenga	30	-33	30	-33				
	DF	(Italy) ITA	Giuseppe Bergomi	30	5	30	5				
	DF	(Italy) ITA	Riccardo Ferri	27	0	26+1	0				
	DF	(Italy) ITA	Giuseppe Baresi	29	1	29	1				
	DF	(Italy) ITA	Fulvio Collovati	25	0	25	0				
	MF	(Italy) ITA	Pietro Fanna	28	0	27+1	0				
	MF	(Italy) ITA	Marco Tardelli	19	2	19	2				
	MF	(Italy) ITA	Andrea Mandorlini	26	0	25+1	0				
	MF	(Republic of Ireland) IRL	Liam Brady	29	3	27+2	3				
	FW	(Italy) ITA	Alessandro Altobelli	29	9	29	9				
	FW	(West Germany) FRG	Karl-Heinz Rummenigge	24	13	24	13				
	GK	(Italy) ITA	Fabrizio Lorieri	0	0	0	0				
	DF	(Italy) ITA	Luciano Marangon	19	0	18+1	0				
	MF	(Italy) ITA	Enrico Cucchi	22	1	11+11	1				
	DF	(Italy) ITA	Daniele Bernazzani	8	0	3+5	0				
	MF	(Italy) ITA	Giuseppe Minaudo	9	1	2+7	1				
	FW	(Italy) ITA	Franco Selvaggi	7	0	2+5	0				
	MF	(Italy) ITA	Alberto Rivolta	2	0	2	0				
	MF	(Italy) ITA	Giampiero Marini	2	0	1+1	0				
	MF	(Italy) ITA	Massimo Pellegrini	2	0	0+2	0				
	FW	(Italy) ITA	Paolo Mandelli	1	0	0+1	0				
	FW	(Italy) ITA	Massimo Ciocci	0	0	0	0				

- Source: http://calcio-seriea.net/presenze/1985/920/

== Sources ==
- RSSSF – Italy 1985/86
