= 1985–86 US Lecce season =

U.S. Lecce
1985–86 season
- Chairman: Franco Jurlano
- Manager: Eugenio Fascetti
- Serie A: 16th (relegated in B)
- Coppa Italia: First round
- Top goalscorer: League: Pasculli (6); All: Pasculli (8)
- Average home league attendance: 287,386 (Serie A)

== Season ==
During 1985–86 season, Lecce marked their Serie A debut with a draw against reigning champion Hellas Verona (2–2). Pugliese side had to face off an early relegation, suffering 19 losses in 30 games and finishing in last place (with 16 points). On April 20, with just a round left, Lecce managed to beat Roma by a 3–2 away: it resulted in Roma wasted the chance to clinch for title. In the following match, Lecce was defeated by Juventus who seized Scudetto.

== Squad ==
Goalkeepers

- (Italy) Stefano Ciucci
- (Italy) Giordano Negretti
- (Italy) Enrico Pionetti

Defenders

- (Italy) Giuseppe Colombo
- (Italy) Luigi Danova
- (Italy) Stefano Di Chiara
- (Italy) Luigi Garzya
- (Italy) Tommaso Logatto
- (Italy) Carmelo Miceli
- (Italy) Roberto Miggiano
- (Italy) Salvatore Nobile
- (Italy) Rodolfo Vanoli

Midfielders

- (Argentina) Juan Barbas
- (Italy) Franco Causio
- (Italy) Antonio Conte
- (Italy) Giorgio Enzo
- (Italy) Dario Levanto
- (Italy) Claudio Luperto
- (Italy) Maurizio Orlandi
- (Italy) Marino Palese
- (Italy) Maurizio Raise
- (Italy) Roberto Rizzo

Attackers

- (Italy) Alberto Di Chiara
- (Italy) Alessandro Morello
- (Italy) Ricardo Paciocco
- (Argentina) Pedro Pasculli

Manager

- (Italy) Eugenio Fascetti

== Competitions ==
=== Serie A ===
==== League table ====
Pos	Team	Pld	W	D	L	GF	GA	GD	Pts	Qualification or relegation
12	Sampdoria	30	8	11	11	27	25	+2	27	
13	Udinese	30	6	13	11	31	37	−6	25	
14	Pisa (R)	30	5	13	12	27	40	−13	23	Relegation to Serie B
15	Bari (R)	30	5	12	13	18	31	−13	22	Relegation to Serie B
16	Lecce (R)	30	5	6	19	23	55	−32	16	Relegation to Serie B

Source: RSSSF.com
Rules for classification: 1) Points; 2) Head-to-head points; 3) Head-to-head goal difference; 4) Goal difference; 5) Goals scored; 6) Draw. (Note: Head-to-head record is used only after all the matches between the teams in question have been played).
(R) Relegated

==== Matches ====
8 September 1985 1	Hellas Verona	2–2	Lecce	Verona
	Elkjær 25'; Di Gennaro 63'	Report	54' Nobile; 72' Paciocco	Stadium: Stadio Marcantonio Bentegodi; Referee: Lo Bello

15 September 1985 2	Milan	1–0	Lecce	Milan
	Virdis 12'	Report		Stadium: Giuseppe Meazza; Referee: Pairetto

22 September 1985 3	Lecce	0–0	Torino	Lecce
		Report		Stadium: Stadio Via del Mare; Referee: Redini

29 September 1985 4	Fiorentina	3–1	Lecce	Florence
	Monelli I 36', 45'; Passarella 83' (pen.)	Report	50' Palese	Stadium: Stadio Comunale; Referee: Baldi

6 October 1985 5	Lecce	0–0	Napoli	Lecce
		Report		Stadium: Stadio Via del Mare; Referee: Casarin

13 October 1985 6	Atalanta	3–1	Lecce	Bergamo
	Donadoni 19'; Cantarutti 51', 54'	Report	66' Causio	Stadium: Stadio Comunale; Referee: Pezzella

20 October 1985 7	Lecce	0–1	Internazionale	Lecce
		Report	11' Cucchi	Stadium: Stadio Via del Mare; Referee: D'Elia

27 October 1985 8	Bari	2–0	Lecce	Bari
	Rideout 32'; Bergossi 80'	Report		Stadium: della Vittoria; Referee: Pieri

3 November 1985 9	Lecce	2–0	Udinese	Lecce
	Barbas 32'; Paciocco 79'	Report		Stadium: Stadio Via del Mare; Referee: Lombardo

10 November 1985 10	Sampdoria	2–0	Lecce	Genoa
	Souness 54'; Mancini 69' (pen.)	Report		Stadium: Stadio Luigi Ferraris; Referee: Magni

24 November 1985 11	Lecce	2–2	Avellino	Lecce
	Causio 8'; Barbas 61'	Report	1' Batista; 82' Murelli	Stadium: Stadio Via del Mare; Referee: Bergamo

1 December 1985 12	Pisa	3–0	Lecce	Pisa
	Baldieri 39'; Muro 74'; Kieft 83'	Report		Stadium: Stadio Arena Garibaldi; Referee: Lanese

8 December 1985 13	Lecce	1–4	Como	Lecce
	Causio 61' (pen.)	Report	34', 84' Borgonovo; 45' Corneliusson; 87' (pen.) Dirceu	Stadium: Stadio Via del Mare; Referee: D'Elia

15 December 1985 14	Lecce	0–3	Roma	Lecce
		Report	58' Bonetti; 64' Boniek; 90' Tovalieri	Stadium: Stadio Via del Mare; Referee: Redini

22 December 1985 15	Juventus	4–0	Lecce	Torino
	Serena 22', 43'; Platini 51', 57'	Report		Stadium: Stadio Comunale; Referee: Coppetelli

5 January 1986 16	Lecce	1–0	Hellas Verona	Lecce
	Pasculli 28'	Report		Stadium: Stadio Via del Mare; Referee: Mattei

12 January 1986 17	Lecce	0–2	Milan	Lecce
		Report	53' (pen.) Virdis; 76' Hateley	Stadium: Stadio Via del Mare; Referee: Agnolin

19 January 1986 18	Torino	3–1	Lecce	Torino
	Di Chiara I 46' (o.g.); Corradini 68'; Júnior 75'	Report	27' Pasculli	Stadium: Stadio Comunale; Referee: Luci

26 January 1986 19	Lecce	2–1	Fiorentina	Lecce
	Pasculli 67'; Di Chiara II 85'	Report	8' Battistini	Stadium: Stadio Via del Mare; Referee: Sguizzato

9 February 1986 20	Napoli	1–0	Lecce	Naples
	Bertoni 43'	Report		Stadium: Stadio San Paolo; Referee: Longhi

16 February 1986 21	Lecce	2–1	Atalanta	Lecce
	Pasculli 56', 75'	Report	52' Strömberg	Stadium: Stadio Via del Mare; Referee: Lombardo

23 February 1986 22	Internazionale	3–0	Lecce	Milan
	Tardelli 55'; Rummenigge 75', 83'	Report		Stadium: Stadio Giuseppe Meazza; Referee: Lamorgese

2 March 1986 23	Lecce	1–1	Bari	Lecce
	Pasculli 86'	Report	10' Piraccini	Stadium: Stadio Via del Mare; Referee: Agnolin

9 March 1986 24	Udinese	2–1	Lecce	Udine
	Miano 30'; Edinho 51' (pen.)	Report	28' Raise	Stadium: Stadio Friuli; Referee: Lombardo

16 March 1986 25	Lecce	0–1	Sampdoria	Lecce
		Report	45' (pen.) Vialli	Stadium: Stadio Via del Mare; Referee: Testa

23 March 1986 26	Avellino	2–0	Lecce	Avellino
	Díaz 44'; Galvani 86'	Report		Stadium: Stadio Partenio; Referee: Leni

6 April 1986 27	Lecce	1–1	Pisa	Lecce
	Mariani 58' (o.g.)	Report	27' Baldieri	Stadium: Stadio Via del Mare; Referee: Pieri

13 April 1986 28	Como	2–0	Lecce	Como
	Albiero 35' (pen.); Fusi 68'	Report		Stadium: Stadio Giuseppe Sinigaglia; Referee: Fabbricatore

20 April 1986 29	Roma	2–3	Lecce	Rome
	Graziani 7'; Pruzzo 82'	Report	34' Di Chiara II; 42' (pen.), 53' Barbas	Stadium: Stadio Olimpico; Referee: Lo Bello

27 April 1986 30	Lecce	2–3	Juventus	Lecce
	Miceli 73'; Di Chiara II 86'	Report	69' Mauro II; 79' Cabrini; 85' Serena	Stadium: Stadio Via del Mare; Referee: Agnolin

=== Coppa Italia ===
Group Phase-Group 2

21 August 1985 1	Padova	2–2	Lecce	Padova
	Lamia Caputo 27'; Da Re 50'		34' Raise; 77' Paciocco	Stadium: Stadio Silvio Appiani; Referee: Luci

27 August 1985 2	Salernitana	0–2	Lecce	Nocera Inferiore
			9' Pasculli; 65' Di Chiara II	Stadium: Stadio San Francesco d'Assisi; Referee: Redini

28 August 1985 3	Lecce	1–1	Lanerossi	Casarano
	Mazzeni 44' (o.g.)		57' Pasciullo	Stadium: Stadio Giuseppe Capozza; Referee: Baldi

1 September 1985 4	Lecce	2–1	Pescara	Casarano
	Olivotto 4' (o.g.); Pasculli 76'		14' Benini	Stadium: Giuseppe Capozza; Referee: Bruschini

4 September 1985 5	Napoli	2–0	Lecce	Naples
	Giordano 23'; Bagni 85'			Stadium: Stadio San Paolo; Referee: Mattei

== Sources ==
- RSSF - Italy 1985/86
