= Mandorlini =

Mandorlini is an Italian surname. Notable people with the surname include:

- Andrea Mandorlini (born 1960), Italian footballer and manager
- Matteo Mandorlini (born 1988), Italian footballer
- Davide Mandorlini (born 1983), Italian footballer
