= Nodari =

Nodari is an Italian surname. Notable people with the surname include:

- Alex Nodari (born 1982), Italian footballer
- Matteo Nodari (born 1991), Italian footballer
- Vindizio Nodari Pesenti (1879–1961), Italian painter

== See also ==
- Nodar
