= Bongiorni =

Bongiorni is an Italian surname. Notable people with the surname include:

- Anna Bongiorni (born 1993), Italian sprinter
- Émile Bongiorni (1921–1949), French footballer
- Gabriele Bongiorni (born 1959), Italian footballer
- Giovanni Bongiorni (born 1956), Italian sprinter
