= Kancheli =

Kancheli (Georgian: ყანჩელი) is a Georgian surname. Notable people with the surname include:

- Giya Kancheli (1935–2019), Georgian composer
- Nodar Kancheli (1938–2015), Russian architect
