= Nodar =

Nodar (Georgian: ნოდარ) is a masculine Georgian given name. Notable people with the given name include:

- Nodar Akhalkatsi (1937–1998), Georgian football manager
- Nodar Dumbadze (1928–1984), Georgian writer and one of the most popular authors in the late 20th-century Georgia
- Nodar Dzhordzhikiya (1921–2008), Soviet basketball player
- Nodar Gvakhariya (1932–1996), Georgian water polo player
- Nodar Kancheli (1938–2015), Russian architect who designed the Transvaal Park water park in Yasenevo and Basmanny Market
- Nodar Khashba (born 1951), former Prime Minister of Abkhazia
- Nodar Khizanishvili (born 1953), Soviet football player of Georgian ethnicity
- Nodar Kumaritashvili (1988–2010), Georgian Olympic luger
- Nodar Lominadze (born 2002), Georgian footballer
- Nodar Mammadov (born 1988), Azerbaijani footballer
- Nodar Mgaloblishvili (1931–2019), Soviet, Russian and Georgian theatrical actor

== See also ==
- Robert Nodar, Jr. (1916–1974), Republican member of the United States House of Representatives from New York
