= Transvaal Park =

Former water park in Moscow, Russia

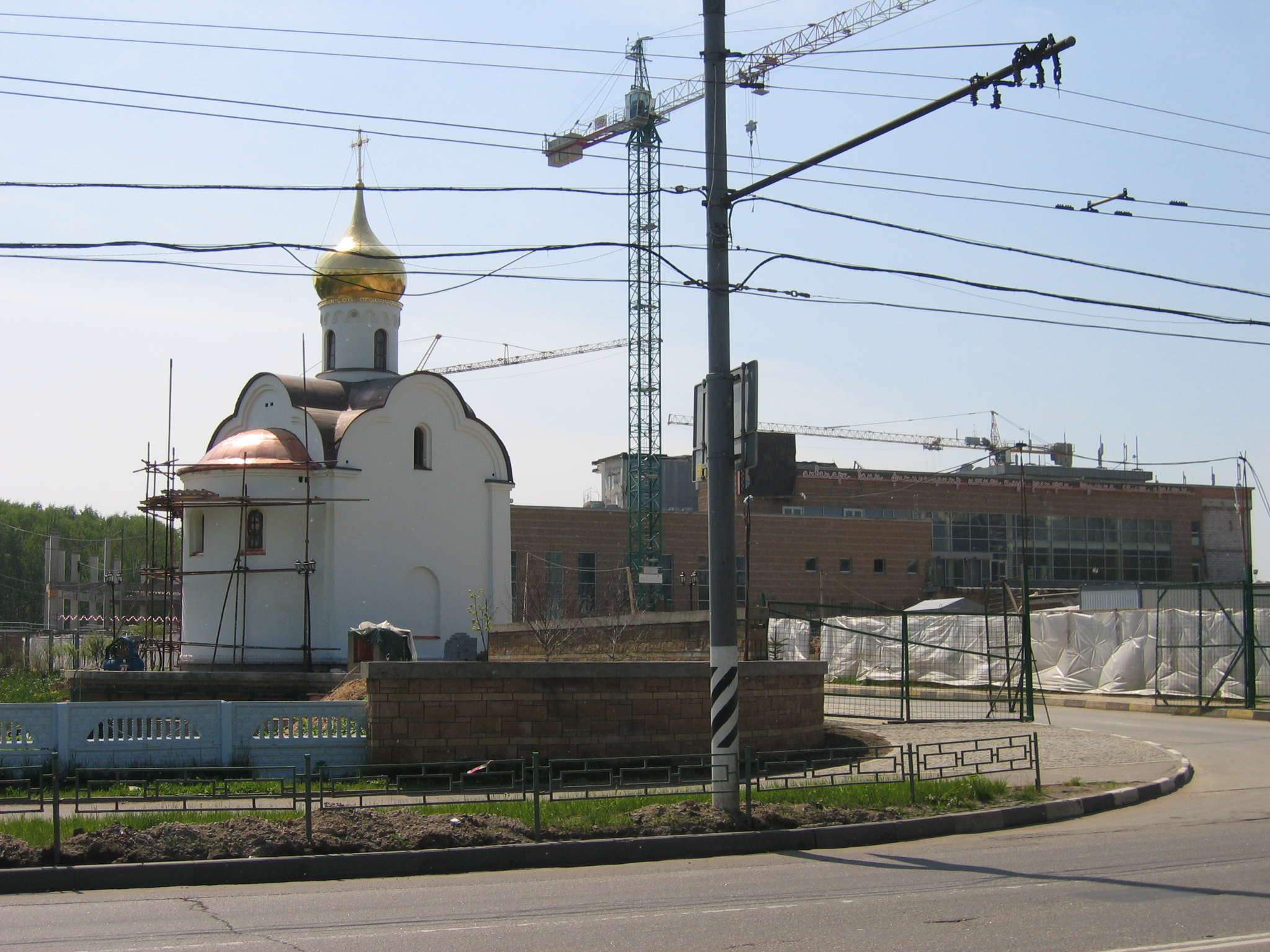
- Former Transvaal Park building and chapel to commemorate the victims of its collapse
- Interactive map of Transvaal Park
- Location: Yasenevo, Moscow, Russia
- Coordinates: 55°35′53″N 37°31′46″E
- Theme: African
- Opened: June 2002
- Closed: February 14, 2004

Transvaal Park was a water park in Yasenevo, a southern district of Moscow, Russia. It had an African theme and was named after a former province of South Africa. With heated pools, including a wave pool and twisting "river" for tubing, it became one of the most popular attractions in the Moscow area and a symbol of the country's bloom of private enterprise. After being open for two years, the roof collapsed, killing 28 people. The park was subsequently closed.

== History ==
=== Construction ===
Transvaal Park was developed by the architectural company Sergey Kiselev and Partners, under architect Nodar Kancheli. The sports and entertainment complex was a five-story building shaped like a whale's tail, covering a total area of 20,200 m^{2}, of which about 7,000 m^{2} was dedicated to water attractions. The project's client was the company European Technologies and Service, which secured a loan of $17.3 million from Sberbank. The total cost of construction was estimated at $40 million.

Initially, there were plans to engage European builders, but due to difficulties in obtaining the necessary licenses and the absence of required Russian standards at that time, the Turkish company Koçak İnşaat Ltd. agreed to build the water park and partially finance the construction.

Construction began in 2000, and by June 2002, Transvaal Park was operational. At the time of its construction, the water park was the largest in Russia and included water attractions, a sports pool, two sauna sections, a bowling alley with a café bar and billiards, a restaurant, a gym, and a beauty salon. The complex could accommodate about 2,000 people.

=== Collapse ===
On 14 February 2004, at 7:15 p.m., the dome of the complex collapsed. Estimates suggest that up to 1,300 people were inside the water park at the time. The date, a Valentine's Day Saturday, attracted a large number of young visitors.

The collapsed area was approximately 5,000 m^{2}. The dome fell onto the water entertainment area, sparing only the adult pool. It resulted in 28 deaths (including 8 children), 12 severe injuries, and 189 other injuries. Kancheli was blamed for the collapse. Two years later, on 23 February 2006, at 09:30 am, the roof of the Basmanny market, also designed by Kancheli, collapsed, killing 66 people.

Kancheli claimed that terrorists likely attacked the venue, but the cause was found to be faulty design.

=== Investigation and trials ===
An investigation was launched, lasting about twenty months, and resulting in the criminal prosecution of Kancheli and the head of the Moscow State Non-Departmental Expertise, Anatoly Voronin. In 2006, both men were released. Kancheli was granted amnesty at his request to commemorate the 100th anniversary of the State Duma. On 30 August 2006, criminal proceedings against Voronin were dropped for lack of criminal intent. Attempts by the victims' representatives to appeal the decisions were unsuccessful.

=== Aftermath ===
In 2005, on the anniversary of the tragedy, a memorial stone with the names of the deceased was placed at the walls of Transvaal Park.

On 13 February 2008, victims and relatives of the deceased filed a complaint with the European Court of Human Rights, demanding recognition of violations by the Russian Federation and the awarding of fair compensation to the victims.

In 2013, the multipurpose complex Moreon was opened on the site of the former water park, and a chapel commemorating the tragedy was established on its premises.

== See also ==
- List of water parks
