= Basmanny market roof collapse =

2006 fatal event in Moscow, Russia

Coordinates: 55°46′10″N 37°40′49″E

Basmanny market (known as Baumansky market until 1994) was a market in the Basmanny area of Moscow, located on Baumanskaya Street. The market operated from 1975 until 2006 when the roof of the market collapsed. This collapse and resulting fire caused the deaths of at least 65 people, with some sources claiming as many as 68.

== History ==
External image
- Basmanny market
- Baumansky market, 1980

Historically in the area of the modern Basmanny district there was a market known as the Nemetskiy market (German market), it was located between Friedrich Engels Street, Ladozhskaya Street and Volkhovskiy Alley. The market ceased to exist after the 1917 revolution. Nonetheless, trading continued in the market buildings until the middle of the 1970s in the form of a collective farm market which operated on weekends.

In 1974, construction began of a two-story market building on Baumansky street under the direction of architect Lev Gilburda. The roof, in the shape of a bowl with a diameter of 90 metres, was designed by the engineer Nodar Vakhtangovich Kancheli, an employee of the "Mosproekt-3" institute. The building was one of the first of a new type of large construction featuring a "hanging dome" supported on the perimeter of the building which were built during the urban renewal of Moscow in the run up to the 1980 Summer Olympics. The roof of the market was Nodar Kancheli's first project and was noted by architects not only in the USSR but in the rest of the world as well; in London it was included in a list of the ten best architectural projects of 1974.

The communal farm market, opened in 1975, was named the Baumansky market after the street it was on. Trade in seasonal products moved there from the former Nemetskiy market. In the 1990s, the market continued to operate as a state unitary enterprise. In 1994, the market was renamed the Basmanny market after the district it was in. In 1997, as part of the 850 year anniversary of Moscow, the market was altered to increase the number of stalls, this included a redevelopment of the mezzanine. The technical committee for the investigation of the causes of the collapse of the Bassmany market stated that the alterations to the mezzanine may have resulted in additional load being placed on the supporting structure. In 2001, the Moscow authorities adopted a resolution on the reconstruction of the Bassmany market, although a schedule for the work was not specified, and in practice, no work was actually carried out.

In 2002, the post of director of Bessmany market was occupied by Mark Mishiev, the founder and owner of the business was the Moscow Property Department. The market provided 258 spaces for merchants, some of which were open 24 hours despite this being illegal. At night, street vendors bought stock from the market and goods were often stored on the mezzanine floor, which was not suitable for the storage of large amounts of stock.

In 2003, the Bassmany market was included in a list of properties subject to mandatory privatisation which was compiled by city authorities, but a year later it was removed from this list. A year later, the Moscow government took the decision to build a commercial and office space with a hotel and underground garage. In 2005, it was again planned to privatise the market, but its physical condition was considered unsatisfactory.

On sale in the Bassmany market at the start of 2006 were food products, consumer goods and building materials. Around 4000 people visited the market every day. At this time the market had not been renovated since it was first constructed, the cables which supported the ceilings were covered in rust and the structure's concrete had been deformed by moisture. There was also an illegal hostel operating from the market for the sellers, many of whom were illegal immigrants. The guests of this hostel had altered the interior of the market for their own needs.

== Collapse ==
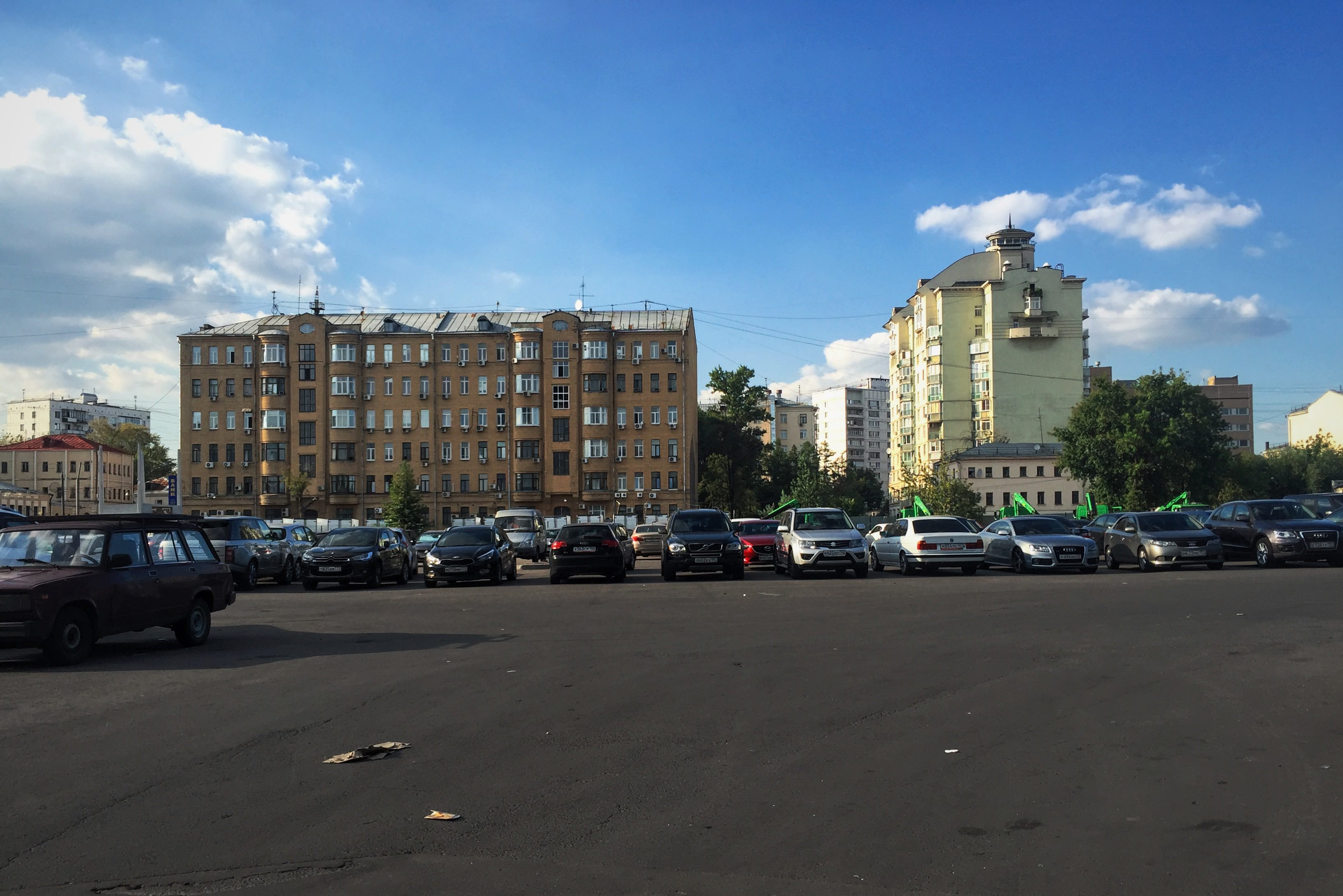
Car park on the site of the former market, 2016

On the morning of 23 February 2006 at 05:20 Moscow time, the roof of the Basmanny market collapsed, a fire broke out immediately following the collapse. As a result of the collapse and subsequent fire, up to 68 people were killed. Amongst the dead were citizens of Russia, Georgia, Azerbaijan, Tajikistan and Uzbekistan who worked in the market. A further 33 people received injuries of varying severity. The area of the destruction covered more than 3,000 square metres. 993 people took part in the rescue operation.

Immediately after the incident, a number of explanations appeared: an error in the design of the building, violation of the operating restrictions of the building and inadequate performance of their duty by officials when inspecting the condition of the building. The possibility of a terrorist attack was rejected early on, as stated by the mayor of Moscow Yuri Mikhailovich Luzhkov.

As a result of the collapse of the Bessmany market a criminal case was opened under article 109, part 3 of the criminal code (causing the death of two or more persons by carelessness) and article 293, part 3 (criminal negligence). The day after the collapse the Moscow prosecutors office arrested Mark Mishieva, although the court of the Zamoscvoretskiy district of Moscow, in defiance of the Moscow prosecutors office, released the director of the market from custody on 6 March. At the end of March this decision was upheld by the Moscow city court and the criminal case was suspended.

Another suspect was the original architect, Nodar Kancheli. The architect had already been blamed for causing death by carelessness in 2004, after the collapse of a waterpark he designed called "Transvaal park" which killed 28 people. Subsequently, experts excluded the possibility that the collapse of the market was due to mistakes in the design and suspicion was removed from Kancheli.

The commission established that the immediate cause of the tragedy was a break in one of the cables that supported the roof. The cable was already vulnerable due to a lack of serious maintenance, was damaged by corrosion and overloaded due to unplanned construction. The insulation in the roof, in the opinion of experts, was: "in places in a waterlogged state and some of the shell bearing elements had corrosive wear of up to 50%".

On 21 April 2006, Bessmany market state unitary enterprise was closed down and the employees were made redundant. After the wreckage of the collapse had been cleared away from the area of the former market, the press announced various projects for the site – a museum of modern art, a library, or a shopping centre. In 2014, the committee for architecture and city planning for the city of Moscow announced the possibility of building a residential building, a sports complex with swimming pool, a public square and a new building for the Goethe German Cultural Centre, but this project was never realised.

In 2008, it was announced that the investigation into the collapse of the Bassmany market had not found anyone to be at fault. In 2009, Mark Mishiev was re-arrested on the same charges but quickly released. In 2010, the general prosecutors office of the Russian Federation, Yuri Yakovlevich Chaika sent the case for further investigation. As of 2018, this investigation was not yet completed.

In 2018, a car park was constructed on the site of the former market. The address of a plot of land (Baumanskaya street, building 47/1) was indicated as the construction site of an affordable housing development as part of the "Moscow housing regeneration programme (2017)". The building will consist of five sections with a maximum height of 10 stories. Externally, the building will be decorated in black and white with arched windows.
