= Davide Mandorlini =

Italian footballer (born 1983)

Personal information
- Date of birth: 30 December 1983 (age 42)
- Place of birth: Ascoli Piceno, Italy
- Height: 1.84 m (6 ft 0 in)
- Position: Centre-back

Youth career
- Ravenna
- 2001–2003: Verona

Senior career*
Years	Team	Apps	(Gls)
2001	Ravenna	1	(0)
2003–2005	Carrarese	36	(2)
2005–2007	Perugia	44	(2)
2007–2009	Venezia	19	(0)
2008	→ Manfredonia (loan)	4	(0)
2009–2010	Gallipoli	1	(0)
2010	Lecco	8	(0)
2010–2011	Real Rimini	26	(1)
2011–2012	Ravenna	22	(1)
2012–2013	Rimini	3	(0)
2013–2017	Ravenna	49	(5)
2017–2019	Alfonsine		
- * Club domestic league appearances and goals

Davide Mandorlini (born 30 December 1983) is an Italian former footballer who played as a centre back.

He is the son of football coach and former player Andrea Mandorlini, who played awith Inter in the 1980s. His brother Matteo is also a footballer.

== Career ==
=== Early career ===
Davide Mandorlini was born in Ascoli Piceno when his father was playing for Ascoli Calcio 1898. He followed his father's footsteps by starting his football career at his hometown club Ravenna Calcio. He made his debut on 27 May 2001, in the round 36 of 2000–01 Serie B. He replaced Alex Nodari in the 79th minute and winning Ancona 5–2. He left the relegated club and signed by Serie B club Verona in summer 2001. In the next season he was awarded no. 28 shirt of the first team and received several call-ups, but never made his debut.

=== Lega Pro clubs ===
At the start of 2003–04 Serie B season, he was awarded no.25 shirt but few week later transferred to Serie C2 club Carrarese along with Simon Laner and Marco Turati, which Mandorlini joined his new club in co-ownership deal. Despite Verona announced the co-ownership deal was renewed in June 2004 but Lega Calcio did not receive any resolution from the clubs, made Carrarese automatically won the remains half for free.

In August 2005 he joined newly found Perugia Calcio which replaced the bankrupted A.C. Perugia to compete in Serie C1.

In July 2007 he was signed by fellow Serie C1 side Venezia, but from different group (Venezia was in Serie C1/B). in January 2008 he was loaned to Serie C/A side Manfredonia along with Alberto Filippini, which he played 4 times for the relegation threatening team.

On 1 July 2008 Mandorlini returned to Venice and played 15 league matches for the Lega Pro Prima Divisione (ex-Serie C1) struggler. He also played both legs of the relegation play-out, one as starter. In although Venezia secured a place in 2009–10 Lega Pro Prima Divisione, the club was expelled from the professional league due to its financial results.

=== Gallipoli & Lecco ===
In August 2009, he was signed by newly promoted Serie B team Gallipoli, which the club previously lack of investment and fielded their youth team for 2009–10 Coppa Italia match, until the arrival of investor from Udine. He took no.23 shirt but only played once, on 21 August 2009 (round 1), he substituted Piergiuseppe Maritato in 55th minute. The opponent later scored the equalizing goal and ended in a 1–1 draw with Ascoli. In January 2010, he left the Serie B struggler and was signed by Prima Divisione club Lecco.

=== Serie D ===
In 2010–11 season, he left for Serie D (non-professional) side Real Rimini, returning to Emilia–Romagna after 9 seasons.
