= Alberto Filippini =

Italian footballer (born 1987)

Personal information
- Date of birth: 10 April 1987 (age 39)
- Place of birth: Brescia, Italy
- Height: 1.84 m (6 ft 1/2 in)
- Position: Forward

Team information
- Current team: PortoMansuè

Youth career
- –2006: Atalanta

Senior career*
Years	Team	Apps	(Gls)
2005–2008	Atalanta	0	(0)
2006–2007	→ Salernitana (loan)	3	(0)
2007	→ Sassuolo (loan)	6	(0)
2007–2008	→ Venezia (loan)	7	(0)
2008	→ Manfredonia (loan)	11	(3)
2008–2011	Padova	37	(0)
2010	→ Como (loan)	12	(2)
2011–2012	Como	30	(9)
2012–2013	Cremonese	25	(3)
2013–2014	Torres	21	(4)
2014–2015	SPAL	22	(1)
2015–2016	Pordenone	24	(8)
2016–2017	Cosenza	15	(1)
2017–2019	Fano	64	(2)
2019–2021	Chions	42	(13)
2021–	PortoMansuè		
- * Club domestic league appearances and goals as of 00:05, 3 March 2020 (UTC)

Alberto Filippini (born 10 April 1987) is an Italian footballer who plays for Eccellenza club PortoMansuè.

== Biography ==
=== Atalanta ===
Born in Brescia, Lombardy, Filippini started his career at another Lombard club Atalanta, which is based in Bergamo. Filippini made his professional debut on 21 August 2005, against Siena in 2005–06 Coppa Italia. He was a substitute of Andrea Soncin.

Filippini also played for the reserve team of Atalanta from 2004 to 2006. From 2006 to 2008, Filippini was loaned to four Serie C1 clubs, namely Salernitana (with Bergamelli), Sassuolo, Venezia and Manfredonia (with Mandorlini from Venice).

=== Padova ===
In summer 2008, Padova signed Filippini in a temporary deal, as his fifth Serie C1 club. The club won promotion to Serie B in 2009. In June 2009, Filippini was signed by Padova in a co-ownership deal in a 3-year contract. Padova also signed his ex-Atalanta team-mate Andrea Soncin in August 2009, who also plays as a forward.

On 1 February 2010, Filippini returned to the third level of Italian football for Calcio Como, as his sixth Serie C1 club. In June 2010 Padova acquired him outright for free.

=== Return to Lega Pro ===
In the second half of the 2010–11 Serie B season, Filippini returned to Calcio Como again in a temporary deal. In July 2011 Filippini was sold to Como outright for free.

On 21 January 2012, Filippini was signed by Cremonese, his seventh Serie C1 club.

Since 2013 Filippini had played for Torres (his first Serie C2 club), SPAL, Pordenone and Cosenza.
