= Giuseppe Accardi =

Italian footballer

Beppe Accardi
Personal information
- Full name: Giuseppe Accardi
- Date of birth: 7 March 1964 (age 62)
- Place of birth: Palermo, Italy
- Positions: Defender; midfielder

Senior career*
Years	Team	Apps	(Gls)
–1981	Bologna	0	(0)
1981–1982	Unione Sportiva Mirandolese	30	(2)
1982–1984	Ravenna	61	(6)
1984–1985	Olbia	31	(2)
1985–1986	Cavese	32	(2)
1986	Inter Milan	0	(0)
1986–1987	Campobasso	28	(0)
1987–1988	Foggia	28	(1)
1988–1989	Licata	24	(3)
1989–1990	Palermo	31	(5)
1990–1992	Alessandria	62	(10)
1992–1994	Reggiana	63	(1)
1994–1995	Venezia	15	(0)
1995–1996	Pelita Jaya		
- * Club domestic league appearances and goals

Giuseppe Accardi (born 7 March 1964) is an Italian football agent and former player.
