= Matteo Mandorlini =

Italian footballer

Personal information
- Date of birth: 22 October 1988 (age 38)
- Place of birth: Como, Italy
- Height: 1.81 m (5 ft 11 in)
- Position: Central midfielder

Youth career
- –2007: Parma

Senior career*
Years	Team	Apps	(Gls)
2006–2011	Parma	1	(0)
2007–2008	→ Pavia (loan)	33	(0)
2008–2009	→ Foligno (loan)	33	(1)
2009–2010	→ Viareggio (loan)	26	(2)
2010–2011	→ Piacenza (loan)	15	(0)
2011–2014	Brescia	42	(0)
2012–2013	→ Spezia (loan)	14	(0)
2013	→ Grosseto (loan)	15	(0)
2014–2015	Pisa	28	(1)
2015–2016	Pordenone	28	(3)
2016–2021	Padova	96	(7)
2021–2022	Seregno	23	(0)
2022–2023	Flaminia	20	(1)
2024–2026	Ravenna	40	(2)
2026-	Tre Fiori FC	1	(0)

International career^{‡}
2004	Italy U16	7	(0)
2004–2005	Italy U17	7	(2)
2006–2007	Italy U19	8	(0)
2008–2009	Italy U20 "C"	5	(1)
- * Club domestic league appearances and goals as of 30 April 2026 ‡ National team caps and goals as of 20 October 2021

Matteo Mandorlini (born 22 October 1988) is an Italian footballer who plays as midfielder for Tre Fiori FC.

He is the son of football coach Andrea Mandorlini, who also played as a footballer with Inter Milan in the 1980s. His brother Davide is also a footballer.

== Club career ==
=== Parma ===
Matteo born Mandorlini in Como, Lombardy, when his father Andrea playing for Internazionale. He started his career with Emilia–Romagna side Parma. Mandorlini has made one Serie A appearance for Parma, that being Parma's 1–0 loss to S.S. Lazio on 14 May 2006 during the 2005–06 season. That match was the last round of the season and Mandorlini substituted Damiano Ferronetti in the 84th minute.

In July 2007, he was loaned to Pavia and sold to Foligno in co-ownership deal in August 2008. He started both legs of the relegation playoffs as a midfielder in 4321/433 formation.

In June 2009, Parma bought him back and loaned to Viareggio.

=== Piacenza ===
In 2010–11 season, he returned to Parma and awarded no.27 shirt, which he also own that number in 2005–06 season. But on 31 August he was loaned to Serie B club Piacenza. He started his first start of the 2010–11 Serie B season on 16 October 2010, as right midfielder (ahead Alessandro Marchi) in 4321/433 formation. The match Piacenza defeated Crotone 1–0. In the next match he moved to left midfielder ahead Tommaso Bianchi.

=== Brescia ===
In June 2011, the last few days of 2010–11 financial year, he moved to Brescia in co-ownership deal. Parma signed Cristian Pedrinelli in exchange also in co-ownership deal. Both players 50% registration rights were valued €1.5 million. Mandorlini played 22 times in 2011–12 Serie B. In June 2012 Mandorlini left for Serie B newcomer Spezia along with Parma team-mate Raffaele Schiavi. On 31 January 2013 he was signed by Grosseto. However Grosseto still relegated to Lega Pro Prima Divisione.

In June 2013 Parma gave up the remain 50% registration rights of Mandorlini to Brescia for free; Pedrinelli also moved to Parma outright for another €80,000.

=== Pisa ===
On 18 July 2014 he was signed by Serie C club Pisa.

=== Pordenone ===
On 22 August 2015 he was signed by Pordenone in a 2-year deal.

=== Seregno ===
On 2 September 2021, he joined Serie C club Seregno.

=== Tre Fiori ===
On 29 August 2026, Mandorlini signed for reigning Campionato Sammarinese di Calcio champions Tre Fiori FC on a free transfer.

== International career ==
Mandorlini was a member of the Italy U17 squad at the 2005 FIFA U-17 World Championship. He was also capped for the Italy U19 team during the team's 2007 UEFA European Under-19 Football Championship elite qualification campaign, and wore the number nine shirt.

After the tournament he never received a call-up from neither the U20 nor the U21 team. Instead, he received a call-up from the C team: Italy under-20 Lega Pro representative team, played for the team at 2008–09 Mirop Cup, but sometimes as a defender.

Padova

- Serie C: 2017–18
- Supercoppa di Serie C: 2018
