= Giovanni Loseto =

Italian footballer (born 1963)

Personal information
- Date of birth: 16 February 1963 (age 63)
- Place of birth: Bari, Italy
- Position: Defender

Youth career
- –1982: Bari

Senior career*
| Years | Team | Apps | (Gls) |
| 1982–1993 | Bari | 318 | (13) |
| 1993–1995 | Pescara | 57 | (1) |
| 1997–1998 | Barletta | 22 | (4) |
| 1998–1999 | Audace Cerignola | 3 | (0) |
| 1999–2000 | Civitas Conversano | | |
- * Club domestic league appearances and goals

Giovanni Loseto (born 16 February 1963) is an Italian former footballer who played as a defender.

== Career ==
Loseto started his career with Italian side Bari. He helped the club achieve promotion. In 1993, he signed for Italian side Pescara. In 1997, he signed for Italian side Barletta. In 1998, he signed for Italian side Audace Cerignola. In 1999, he signed for Italian side Civitas Conversano.

== Style of play ==
Loseto mainly operated as a defender. He was described as a "grim stopper, all heart and charisma".

== Personal life ==
Loseto was born in 1963 in Italy. He is the brother of Italian footballer Onofrio Loseto.
