= Carmelo Miceli =

Italian footballer (1958–2025)

Carmelo Miceli (20 August 1958 – 10 December 2025) was an Italian football player and manager.

== Career ==
Miceli was born 20 August 1958 in Cosenza. With 290 appearances between Serie A and Serie B, he is the third player with the number of appearances in the ranks of Lecce.

== Death ==
Miceli died from a heart attack on 10 December 2025, at the age of 67.
