= Daniel Passarella =

Argentine footballer (born 1953)

Daniel Alberto Passarella
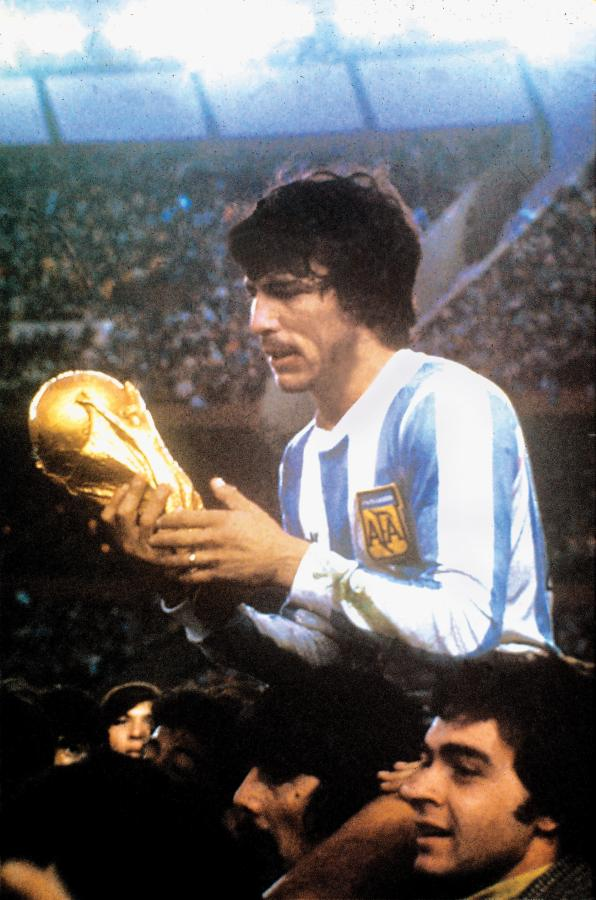
- Passarella after winning the 1978 FIFA World Cup

President of River Plate
- In office 5 December 2009 – 15 December 2013
- Preceded by: José María Aguilar
- Succeeded by: Rodolfo D'Onofrio

Personal details
- Born: Daniel Alberto Passarella; 25 May 1953 (age 73) Chacabuco, Buenos Aires, Argentina
- Height: 1.70 m (5 ft 7 in)
- Occupation: Footballer
Association football career
- Positions: Centre-back; sweeper
Senior career*
| Years | Team | Apps | (Gls) |
| 1971–1973 | Sarmiento | 36 | (9) |
| 1973–1982 | River Plate | 266 | (90) |
| 1982–1986 | Fiorentina | 109 | (26) |
| 1986–1988 | Inter Milan | 44 | (9) |
| 1988–1989 | River Plate | 24 | (7) |
| Total | | 479 | (143) |
International career
| 1976–1986 | Argentina | 70 | (22) |
Managerial career
- 1989–1994: River Plate
- 1994–1998: Argentina
- 1999–2001: Uruguay
- 2001: Parma
- 2002–2004: Monterrey
- 2005: Corinthians
- 2006–2007: River Plate
Medal record
Men's football
Representing Argentina
FIFA World Cup
| Winner | 1978 Argentina |
| Winner | 1986 Mexico |
Representing Argentina (as manager)
Pan American Games
| Gold medal – first place | 1995 Mar del Plata | Team |
Olympic Games
| Silver medal – second place | 1996 Atlanta | Team |
- * Club domestic league appearances and goals

Daniel Alberto Passarella (born 25 May 1953) is an Argentine former footballer and manager, who is considered one of the greatest defenders of all time. As a player for Argentina, he was part of two FIFA World Cup-winning teams; he captained his nation to victory at the 1978 World Cup which Argentina hosted, and was also part of the winning squad in 1986. He is the only Argentine player to win two world cups.

Although playing as a centre-back, Passarella was also a proficient goalscorer; at one point, he was football's highest-scoring defender, with 134 goals in 451 matches, a record which was subsequently broken by Dutch player Ronald Koeman. In 2004, Passarella was named one of the 125 greatest living footballers by Pelé at a FIFA awards ceremony. In 2017, he was named as the 56th best player by FourFourTwo in their list of the 100 all-time greatest footballers. As a manager, he coached the Argentina and Uruguay national teams, among several club sides.

After his playing and coaching career, Passarella also served as the president of River Plate for four years, after winning the elections in December 2009.

== Club career ==
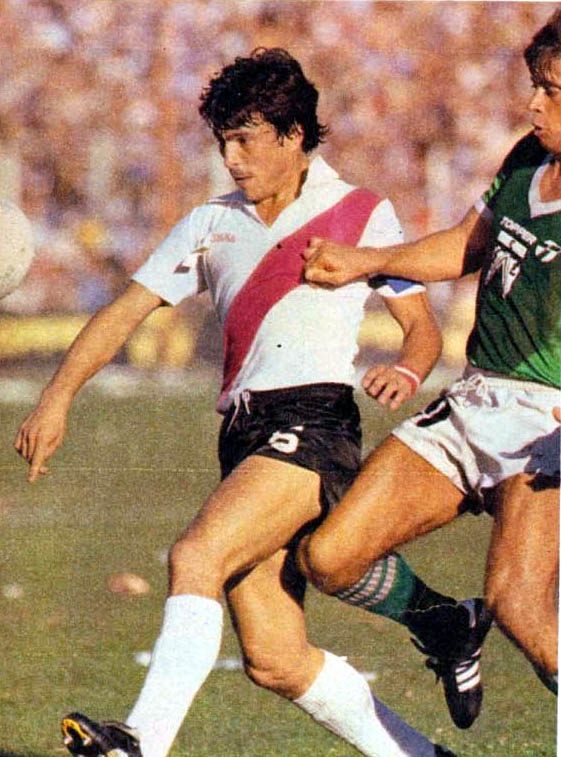
Passarella playing for River Plate, 1981

Passarella was born in Chacabuco, Buenos Aires. He started his career at Sarmiento of Junín, Buenos Aires, in 1971. He played there until 1973, when he joined River Plate. Playing for Los Millonarios, he was constantly starting to be called up to the Argentina national team.

After his good performances at the 1982 World Cup, he joined Serie A side Fiorentina in the summer of 1982. At the Italian club, he scored 11 goals during the 1985–86 season, a record for a defender at the time, although the goal tally was surpassed by Marco Materazzi in the 2000–01 season.

In 1986, he joined Internazionale, where he ended his Italian playing career in 1988. After his successful spell in the Serie A, he returned to River Plate, where he played until his retirement.

He was called "El Gran Capitán" ('the Great Captain', the nickname of the Argentinian independence hero, José de San Martín),"El Kaiser" (an allusion to German defender Franz Beckenbauer) or "El Caudillo" ('the Chief') because of his leadership ability, his passion, and his organisational prowess on the field. He was a defender who often joined the attack, and helped generate and finish offensive plays. He was the all-time highest-scoring defender, with 134 goals in 451 matches, a record that was later broken by Dutch player Ronald Koeman.

His aerial game was effective both defensively and in attack. Despite his average height of 1.73 m, he frequently scored headers. He was also a noted free-kick and penalty specialist. Furthermore, he was known for using elbows against rivals whilst managing to avoid the referee's gaze.

== International career ==
As one of the pillars of the Argentina national football team, he would captain the team during the 1978 World Cup held in Argentina. He was the first Argentine player to hold the World Cup, as it was handed to him first when Argentina won the final.

During the qualifying rounds of the 1986 World Cup, Passarella contributed to the goal which ensured Argentina's qualification in the final minutes of their match against Peru by allowing teammate Ricardo Gareca to score.

A bout of enterocolitis caused him to miss the 1986 World Cup in Mexico. He was replaced in the first team by defender José Luis Brown and failed to regain his place after recovering from illness. Passarella had a fractious relationship with captain Diego Maradona and coach Carlos Bilardo during the tournament. He later claimed Bilardo and Maradona made certain that he was sidelined; although he is the first and so far only player to feature in two Argentina World Cup–winning squads, he did not play any of the matches in 1986, not even as a substitute.

== Player profile ==
=== Style of play ===
Despite playing as a centre-back, normally operating in the sweeper or libero role, Passarella was also a prolific goalscorer, and was known for his ability to push forward and contribute to his team's attacking plays. Despite his small stature (1.73m), he was also known to be good in the air, which made him a goal threat on indirect set pieces, with many of his goals coming from headers; he was also known for scoring decisive goals in important games throughout his career, and was also an accurate direct free kick and penalty kick taker.

In addition to his offensive qualities, he stood out for his excellent technical ability and ball-playing skills, which allowed him to start attacking plays from the back with his passing. Defensively, he was also a physically strong and tough-tackling defender, with The Times recalling in 2007 that he "tackled with the ferocity of the wild bull of the Pampas". He was also known for using his elbows aggressively when defending. Dutch international footballer Ruud Gullit described Passarella as "so intensely vicious, a real Argentinian killer". Nicknamed El Gran Capitán ("The Great Captain," in Spanish), beyond his qualities as a player, he was highly regarded for his leadership, strong mentality, and determination on the pitch, as well as his ability to motivate his teammates and organise his team's defensive line.

=== Legacy ===
Considered by pundits to be one of the greatest sweepers and defenders of all time, in 2004, Passarella was named one of the 125 greatest living footballers by Pelé at a FIFA awards ceremony. In 2007, The Times also placed him at 36th in their list of the 50 hardest footballers in history. In 2017, he was named as the 56th best player ever by FourFourTwo in their list of the 100 all-time greatest footballers. In 2024, Sports Illustrated placed him at 18th in their list of "The 50 Best Defenders in Soccer History."

== Coaching career ==
After the end of his playing career, he returned to River Plate as a manager and guided them to three national championships, in 1989–90, 1991 and 1993. Thereafter, Passarella was appointed as the coach of the Argentina national team in 1994, replacing Alfio Basile. He was in charge of the team during the 1998 World Cup qualification campaign and later the competition itself, which was held in France. As the Argentina team head, Passarella had appointed a close friend and a fellow 1978 world champion, Américo Gallego, as his assistant coach. He banned long hair, earrings and homosexuals in the national team, leading to disputes with several players. Fernando Redondo and Claudio Caniggia, two of the most talented Argentine players of that generation, eventually refused to play for Passarella and were excluded from his squad.

Argentina's performances never reached the expected heights during the 1998 World Cup; the team was eliminated in the quarter-final after a last minute 2–1 defeat to the Netherlands. After the elimination, Passarella left the post and was replaced by compatriot Marcelo Bielsa. Subsequently, Passarella became the manager of the Uruguay national team, the first foreigner to take the job of Uruguay team, but he left the post during the 2002 World Cup qualification process. Afterwards, Passarella had a brief and unsuccessful stint as the coach of Italian side Parma in 2001, where, despite success in the UEFA Cup and Coppa Italia, he was ultimately sacked after losing all of his five matches in the league, with the club sitting in the relegation zone.

In 2003, he won the Mexican league title with Monterrey. In March 2004, he was named by Pelé as one of the 125 greatest living footballers. He was then hired as coach of Corinthians in Brazil, but was fired after a few months after a spell of bad results.

On 9 January 2006, he was appointed River Plate coach again after 12 years to occupy the vacancy left by Reinaldo Merlo's sudden departure. On 15 November 2007, he resigned as coach after River was beaten by penalties by Arsenal de Sarandí in the semi-final of the 2007 Copa Sudamericana.

In the summer of 2018, after publicly expressing interest in returning he was widely seen as the frontrunner to become the new manager of Monterrey for a second stint after the departure of Antonio Mohamed but the club ultimately decided to appoint Diego Alonso.

== Administrative career ==
Passarella was elected as president of River Plate in December 2009. The club was in poor financial shape when Passarella took charge. River Plate were relegated for the first time in the club's 110-year history in 2011. Passarella was alleged to have engaged in fraud during his presidency.

== Career statistics ==
=== Club ===
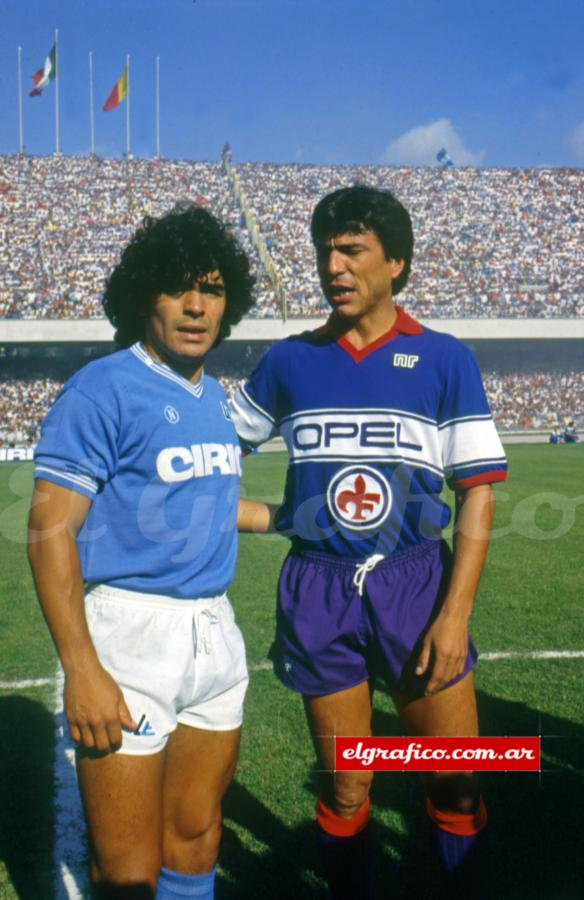
Passarella with Diego Maradona in May 1985

Appearances and goals by club, season and competition
| Club | Season | League | | | Cup | | Continental | | Total | |
| Club | Season | Division | Apps | Goals | Apps | Goals | Apps | Goals | Apps | Goals |
|---|---|---|---|---|---|---|---|---|---|---|
| Sarmiento | 1971 | Primera División C | ? | 0 | — | | — | | ? | 0 |
| Sarmiento | 1972 | Primera División C | ? | 0 | — | | — | | ? | 0 |
| Sarmiento | 1973 | Primera División C | 36 | 9 | — | | — | | 36 | 9 |
| Sarmiento | Total | | 36+ | 9 | 0 | 0 | 0 | 0 | 36+ | 9 |
| River Plate | 1974 | Primera División | 22 | 5 | — | | — | | 22 | 5 |
| River Plate | 1975 | Primera División | 29 | 9 | — | | — | | 29 | 9 |
| River Plate | 1976 | Primera División | 35 | 24 | — | | ? | 1 | 35 | 24 |
| River Plate | 1977 | Primera División | 40 | 13 | — | | ? | 1 | 40 | 13 |
| River Plate | 1978 | Primera División | 19 | 4 | — | | ? | 1 | 19 | 4 |
| River Plate | 1979 | Primera División | 38 | 9 | — | | — | | 38 | 9 |
| River Plate | 1980 | Primera División | 41 | 12 | — | | ? | 0 | 41 | 12 |
| River Plate | 1981 | Primera División | 42 | 14 | — | | ? | 1 | 42 | 14 |
| River Plate | Total | | 266 | 90 | 0 | 0 | ? | 4 | 266+ | 94 |
| Fiorentina | 1982–83 | Serie A | 27 | 3 | 5 | 0 | 2 | 0 | 34 | 3 |
| Fiorentina | 1983–84 | Serie A | 27 | 7 | 7 | 1 | — | | 34 | 8 |
| Fiorentina | 1984–85 | Serie A | 26 | 5 | 6 | 3 | 3 | 1 | 35 | 9 |
| Fiorentina | 1985–86 | Serie A | 29 | 11 | 7 | 4 | — | | 36 | 15 |
| Fiorentina | Total | | 109 | 26 | 25 | 8 | 5 | 1 | 139 | 35 |
| Internazionale | 1986–87 | Serie A | 23 | 3 | 8 | 4 | 7 | 1 | 38 | 8 |
| Internazionale | 1987–88 | Serie A | 21 | 6 | 8 | 1 | 6 | 0 | 35 | 7 |
| Internazionale | Total | | 44 | 9 | 16 | 5 | 13 | 1 | 73 | 15 |
| River Plate | 1988–89 | Primera División | 24 | 7 | — | | — | | 24 | 7 |
| Career total | | | 479 | 134 | 41 | 13 | 18+ | 6 | 538+ | 153 |

=== International ===
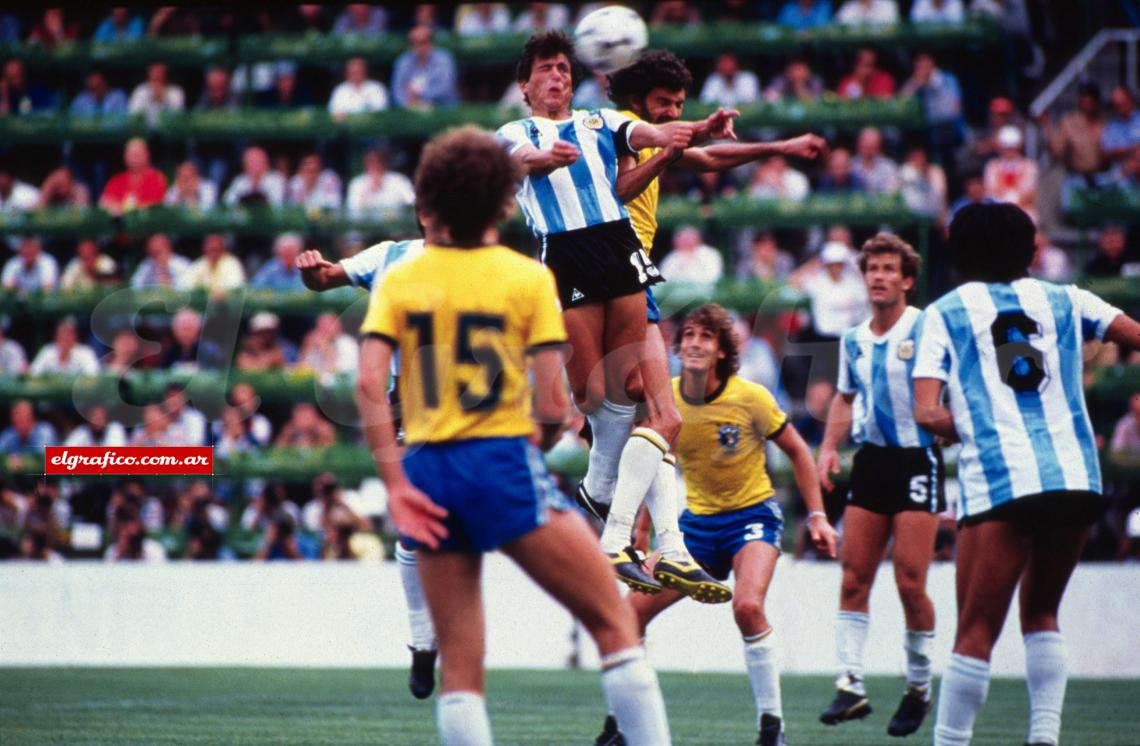
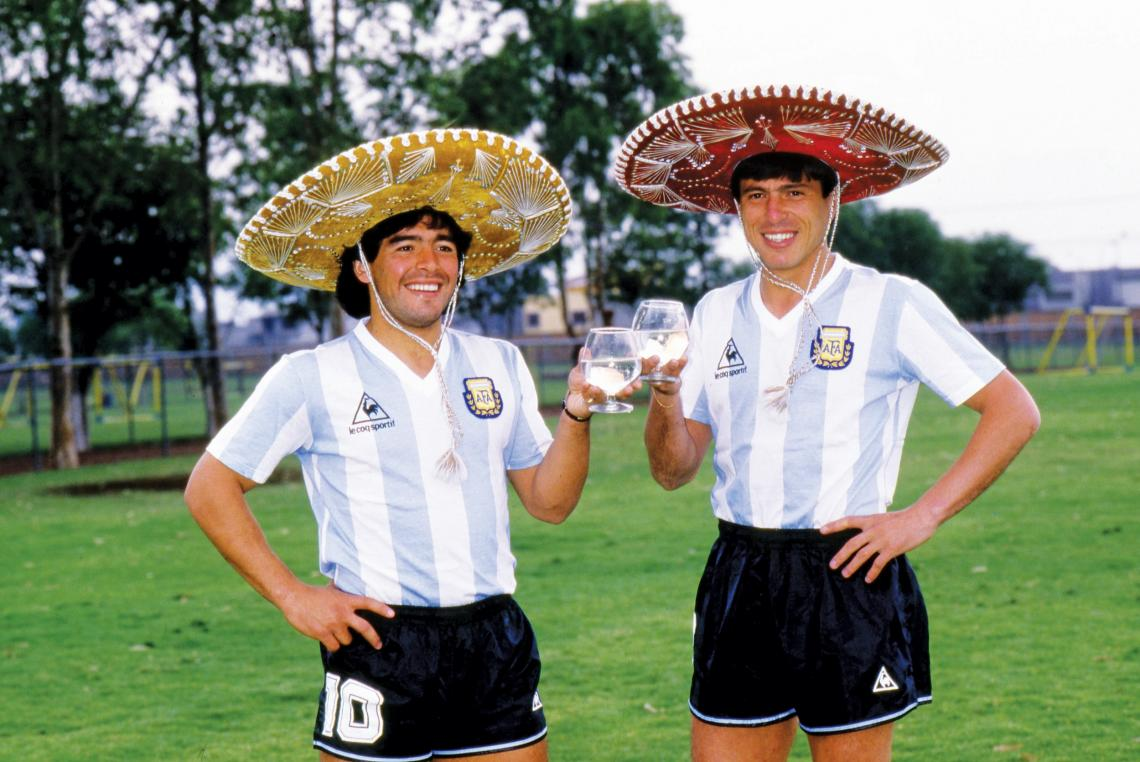
Three World Cup moments of Passarella as a player for Argentina, (left): Being carried by supporters, holding the FIFA World Cup Trophy, after winning the 1978 final; (middle): jumping to head the ball against Brazil in 1982; (right): pictured with compatriot Diego Maradona in Mexico in 1986

Appearances and goals by national team and year
| National team | Year | Apps | Goals |
|---|---|---|---|
| Argentina | 1976 | 6 | 2 |
| Argentina | 1977 | 7 | 3 |
| Argentina | 1978 | 13 | 4 |
| Argentina | 1979 | 11 | 5 |
| Argentina | 1980 | 9 | 3 |
| Argentina | 1981 | 4 | 1 |
| Argentina | 1982 | 9 | 3 |
| Argentina | 1983 | 0 | 0 |
| Argentina | 1984 | 0 | 0 |
| Argentina | 1985 | 8 | 1 |
| Argentina | 1986 | 3 | 0 |
| Total | | 70 | 22 |

Scores and results list Argentina's goal tally first, score column indicates score after each Passarella goal.

List of international goals scored by Daniel Passarella
| No. | Date | Venue | Opponent | Score | Result | Competition |
|---|---|---|---|---|---|---|
| 1 | 28 October 1976 | Lima, Peru | Peru | 2–1 | 3–1 | Friendly |
| 2 | 10 November 1976 | José Amalfitani, Buenos Aires, Argentina | Peru | 1–0 | 1–0 | Friendly |
| 3 | 5 June 1977 | La Bombonera, Buenos Aires, Argentina | West Germany | 1–3 | 1–3 | Friendly |
| 4 | 18 June 1977 | La Bombonera, Buenos Aires, Argentina | Scotland | 1–1 | 1–1 | Friendly |
| 5 | 3 July 1977 | La Bombonera, Buenos Aires, Argentina | Yugoslavia | 1–0 | 1–0 | Friendly |
| 6 | 23 March 1978 | Nacional, Lima, Peru | Peru | 2–0 | 3–1 | Friendly |
| 7 | 5 April 1978 | La Bombonera, Buenos Aires, Argentina | Romania | 1–0 | 2–0 | Friendly |
| 8 | 5 April 1978 | La Bombonera, Buenos Aires, Argentina | Romania | 2–0 | 2–0 | Friendly |
| 9 | 6 June 1978 | Monumental, Buenos Aires, Argentina | France | 1–0 | 2–1 | 1978 FIFA World Cup |
| 10 | 25 April 1979 | Monumental, Buenos Aires, Argentina | Bulgaria | 2–1 | 2–1 | Friendly |
| 11 | 26 May 1979 | Olimpico, Rome, Italy | Italy | 2–2 | 2–2 | Friendly |
| 12 | 8 August 1979 | Monumental, Buenos Aires, Argentina | Bolivia | 1–0 | 3–0 | 1979 Copa América |
| 13 | 23 August 1979 | Monumental, Buenos Aires, Argentina | Brazil | 1–1 | 2–2 | 1979 Copa América |
| 14 | 16 September 1979 | Crvena Zvezda, Belgrade, Yugoslavia | Yugoslavia | 1–3 | 2–4 | Friendly |
| 15 | 13 May 1980 | Wembley Stadium, London, England | England | 1–2 | 1–3 | Friendly |
| 16 | 12 October 1980 | Monumental, Buenos Aires, Argentina | Poland | 1–0 | 2–1 | Friendly |
| 17 | 16 December 1980 | Olímpico Chateau Carreras, Córdoba, Argentina | Switzerland | 5–0 | 5–0 | Friendly |
| 18 | 28 October 1981 | Monumental, Buenos Aires, Argentina | Poland | 1–0 | 1–2 | Friendly |
| 19 | 5 May 1982 | José Amalfitani, Buenos Aires, Argentina | Bulgaria | 2–1 | 2–1 | Friendly |
| 20 | 23 June 1982 | José Rico Pérez, Alicante, Spain | El Salvador | 1–0 | 2–0 | 1982 FIFA World Cup |
| 21 | 29 June 1982 | Sarrià, Barcelona, Spain | Italy | 1–2 | 1–2 | 1982 FIFA World Cup |
| 22 | 26 May 1985 | Polideportivo de Pueblo Nuevo, San Cristóbal, Venezuela | Venezuela | 2–1 | 3–2 | 1986 FIFA World Cup qualification |

== Honours ==
=== Player ===
River Plate

- Primera División: 1975 Metropolitano, 1975 Nacional, 1977 Metropolitano, 1979 Metropolitano, 1979 Nacional, 1980 Metropolitano, 1981 Nacional
- Copa Libertadores runner-up: 1976

Argentina Youth

- Toulon Tournament: 1975

Argentina

- FIFA World Cup: 1978, 1986

Individual

- Argentine Footballer of the Year: 1976
- FIFA World Cup All-Star Team: 1978
- World Soccer World XI: 1982, 1983
- Serie A Team of The Year: 1984
- FIFA 100: 2004
- Golden Foot Legends Award: 2015
- AFA Team of All Time (published 2015)
- World Soccer: The 100 Greatest Footballers of All Time
- Fiorentina All-time XI
- IFFHS All-time Men's B Dream Team: 2021
- IFFHS South America Men's Team of All Time: 2021
- IFFHS Argentina All Times Dream Team: 2021
- IFFHS Legends

=== Manager ===
River Plate

- Primera División: 1989–90, Apertura 1991, Apertura 1993
- Supercopa Libertadores runner-up: 1991

Monterrey

- Mexican Primera División: Clausura 2003

Argentina

- Pan American Games Gold Medal: 1995
- Olympic Games Silver Medal: 1996

Individual

- South American Coach of the Year: 1997

=== President ===
River Plate

- Primera B Nacional: 2011–12
