= Salvatore Nobile =

Italian footballer and manager

Salvatore Antonio Nobile
Personal information
- Date of birth: 12 January 1964 (age 62)
- Place of birth: Copertino, Italy
- Position: Defender

Team information
- Current team: Fosa Juniors (head coach)

Senior career*
| Years | Team | Apps | (Gls) |
| 1982–1987 | Lecce | 68 | (4) |
| 1984–1985 | Reggina (loan) | 24 | (1) |
| 1987–1989 | Internazionale | 19 | (0) |
| 1988–1989 | Lecce (loan) | 26 | (0) |
| 1989–1991 | Cesena | 64 | (4) |
| 1991–1996 | Pescara | 147 | (12) |
| 1996–1997 | Casarano | 37 | (0) |
| 1997–1998 | Atletico Catania | 22 | (1) |
| 1998–2000 | Pro Italia Galatina | | |

Managerial career
- 1999–2001: Pro Italia Galatina
- 2001–2002: Tricase
- 2003: Gallipoli
- 2003–2005: Nardò
- 2005: Manduria
- 2007–2009: Africa Sports
- 2011–2012: Africa Sports
- 2012–2013: Séwé Sport
- 2013–2014: AS Mangasport
- 2017: Brindisi
- 2017–2018: Atletico Aradeo
- 2020–: Fosa Juniors
- * Club domestic league appearances and goals

Salvatore Antonio Nobile (born 12 January 1964 in Copertino, Italy) is an Italian former football player and manager, who is managing Malagasy team Fosa Juniors.

He played for US Lecce, Reggina Calcio, Internazionale, AC Cesena, Pescara Calcio, Virtus Casarano and USD Atletico Catania before moving into management. He managed Frattese, Galatina, Tricase, Gallipoli, Nuova Nardò Calcio, Manduria and Africa Sports d'Abidjan, which released him in April 2009.
