= Gabriele Bongiorni =

Italian footballer

Personal information
- Full name: Gabriele Bongiorni
- Date of birth: 16 May 1959 (age 67)
- Place of birth: Chignolo Po, Italy
- Height: 1.80 m (5 ft 11 in)
- Position: Midfielder

Youth career
- Oratorio Stradella

Senior career*
Years	Team	Apps	(Gls)
1977–1980	Alessandria	84	(11)
1980–1981	Savona	33	(4)
1981–1985	Varese	139	(24)
1985–1987	Cremonese	69	(5)
1987–1988	Catanzaro	37	(3)
1988–1989	Ascoli	16	(0)
1989–1991	Trento	60	(8)
1991–1993	Oltrepò Calcio	66	(13)
- * Club domestic league appearances and goals

Gabriele Bongiorni (born 16 May 1959) is an Italian former footballer. Originally from the province of Pavia, he made his Serie A debut in the 1988–89 season with Ascoli.

== Palmares ==
- Campionato Interregionale 1991/92 (Oltrepò)
