= Nodar Kancheli =

Russian architect (1938–2015)

Nodar Kancheli

Nodar Vakhtangovich Kancheli (Russian: Нода́р Вахта́нгович Канче́ли; 21 April 1938 – 26 June 2015) was a Russian architect. He is known for being the designer of two buildings that collapsed, causing fatalities. The buildings, located in Moscow, were Transvaal Park water park in Yasenevo (built in 2002, collapsed in 2004) and Basmanny Market (built in 1977, collapsed in 2006). The collapse of these structures caused the deaths of at least 89 people.

Kancheli also co-designed the Druzhba Sanatorium with Igor Vasilevsky.
