= Massimo Albiero =

Italian footballer and manager (born 1960)

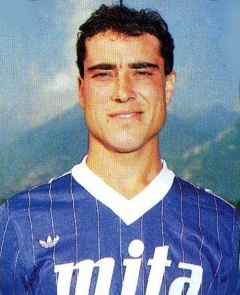
- Albiero with Como in 1985

Personal information
- Full name: Massimo Albiero
- Date of birth: 18 May 1960
- Place of birth: Adria, Italy
- Height: 1.85 m (6 ft 1 in)
- Position: Libero

Youth career
- –1978: SPAL

Senior career*
Years	Team	Apps	(Gls)
1978–1981	SPAL	82	(1)
1981	Como	4	(0)
1981–1982	SPAL	9	(0)
1982–1983	Avellino	2	(0)
1983–1989	Como	166	(8)
1989–1990	Padova	24	(1)
1990–1991	SPAL	19	(4)
1994–1995	Adriese	7	(0)

International career
1980–1981	Italy U21	8	(0)

Managerial career
- 1994–1997: Adriese
- 1998–1999: Monselice
- * Club domestic league appearances and goals

Massimo Albiero (Italian pronunciation: [ˈmassimo alˈbjɛːro]; born 18 May 1960) was an Italian professional footballer who played as a defender.

== Club career ==
Albiero began his professional career in the 1977–78 Serie C season for SPAL. He then played for the club for four seasons until 1981, making a total of 82 appearances in Serie B and Serie C, and scoring one goal In the 1981–82 season, Albiero had a brief first spell with Como, who competed in the top flight of Italian football. He then made his Serie A debut against Fiorentina on 13 September 1981.
