= Alex Nodari =

Italian footballer (born 1982)

Personal information
- Date of birth: 15 February 1982 (age 44)
- Place of birth: Ravenna, Italy
- Height: 1.86 m (6 ft 1 in)
- Position: Defender

Team information
- Current team: Riccione

Youth career
- Ravenna

Senior career*
Years	Team	Apps	(Gls)
2000–2001	Ravenna	5	(0)
2001–2002	Alessandria		
2002–2003	Cattolica		
2003–2005	Derthona		
2006–2009	Novese		
2009	Voghera		
2009–2010	Valleverde Riccione	16	(1)
2010–2012	Riccione		
2012–2013	SPAL		
2013–2016	AJ Fano		
2016-2017	Castelvetro Calcio		
2017–2020	Recanatese	40	(4)
2020–2021	Marignanese Calcio		
2021–	Virtus	59	(4)
- * Club domestic league appearances and goals as of 25 June 2023

Alex Nodari (born 15 February 1982) is an Italian footballer who plays for Virtus in San Marino.

== Biography ==
Born in Ravenna, Nodari played 5 matches for Ravenna Calcio in 2000–01 Serie B. Nodari played the first match of that season on 23 December 2000 (round 17), substituted Emanuele Pellizzaro in the last minutes. That match Ravenna won Ancona 1–0. He played his first start on 22 April (round 32), losing to Sampdoria 0–2 and started the last 3 matches of the season (round 36 to 38). Ravenna as the second from the bottom and relegated.

In the next season he left for Alessandria

He then left for non-professional teams including Cattolica and Derthona, which he won promotion to Serie D from Eccellenza for the latter team in 2004. He also played a charity match as a member of European star against the Rest of the World in 2004, which he was picked by Harry Redknapp, the football manager of Portsmouth and the coach of the World team. He was also had a trail for Portsmouth at that time. After failed to secure a contract after the left of Redknapp, Nodari played another season for Derthona.

In 2009–10 season, he played for Serie D side Valleverde Riccione, but after the club relocated to Rimini, Nodari remained in Riccione for newly found Eccellenza club A.S.D. Riccione 1929.
