= Fabrizio Lorieri =

Italian footballer and coach

Personal information
- Date of birth: 11 February 1964 (age 62)
- Place of birth: Massa, Italy
- Height: 1.86 m (6 ft 1 in)
- Position: Goalkeeper

Senior career*
Years	Team	Apps	(Gls)
1980–1986	Internazionale	0	(0)
1981–1982	→ Sangiovannese (loan)	33	(0)
1982–1983	→ Prato (loan)	19	(0)
1984–1985	→ Piacenza (loan)	34	(0)
1986–1989	Torino	71	(0)
1989–1993	Ascoli	141	(0)
1993–1995	Roma	22	(0)
1995–1999	Lecce	140	(0)
1999–2000	Salernitana	29	(0)
2000–2002	Genoa	66	(0)
2002–2003	Spezia	8	(0)
2004	Cappiano Cuoiopelli	5	(0)

Managerial career
- 2023: Spezia (caretaker)
- * Club domestic league appearances and goals

Fabrizio Lorieri (born 11 February 1964 in Massa) is an Italian professional football coach and a former player who played as a goalkeeper, currently in charge as goalkeeping coach of Spezia.

== Playing career ==
Lorieri spent 11 seasons in the Serie A for 4 different teams (though he never played for his first team, Internazionale), in 7 of those seasons he was the first-choice goalkeeper for his team, playing 192 games in the top-flight division overall.

== Managerial career ==
After his retirement he worked alongside former head coach Luigi Cagni as his assistant at Catanzaro, Empoli and Parma. In 2007 he obtained his UEFA Pro licence at the Centro Tecnico Federale di Coverciano, his dissertation covering the subject of goalkeeping psychology in football.

In 2010 he joined Lecce, a former club of his as a player, as a goalkeeping coach. In 2013, after leaving Lecce, he was hired by Sassuolo as a goalkeeping coach, filling in the role until 2019.

In 2019 he was called by Eusebio Di Francesco to work alongside him at Cagliari as his goalkeeping coach.

In June 2022, he was named Luca Gotti's assistant at Serie A club Spezia. Following the dismissal of Gotti in February 2023, Lorieri was then appointed caretaker coach of Spezia for the upcoming league game against Juventus. He was successively confirmed as a goalkeeping coach following the appointment of Leonardo Semplici as the new first team head coach.

== Coaching statistics ==
As of match played 15 February 2023

Team	Nat.	From	To	Record								Ref.
Team	Nat.	From	To	G	W	D	L	GF	GA	GD	Win %	Ref.
Spezia (caretaker)	(Italy)	15 February 2023	23 February 2023	1	0	0	1	0	2	−2	0.00	
Career totals				2	0	1	1	2	4	−2	0.00	—
