= Fabio Calcaterra =

Italian footballer and coach

Personal information
- Date of birth: 13 May 1965 (age 61)
- Place of birth: Magenta, Italy
- Height: 1.81 m (5 ft 11 1/2 in)
- Position: Defender

Senior career*
| Years | Team | Apps | (Gls) |
| 1983–1988 | Internazionale | 26 | (0) |
| 1984–1985 | → Siena (loan) | 32 | (2) |
| 1985–1986 | → Lazio (loan) | 33 | (0) |
| 1988–1991 | Cesena | 94 | (1) |
| 1991–1993 | Bari | 31 | (1) |
| 1993–1995 | Cesena | 62 | (4) |
| 1995–1996 | SPAL | 23 | (4) |
| 1996 | Gualdo | 0 | (0) |
| 1996–1997 | Forlì | 21 | (0) |
| 1997–1998 | Catania | 14 | (0) |
| 1998–1999 | Cremapergo | 15 | (0) |
| 1999–2000 | Atletico Milan | | |
| 2000–2001 | Brera | | |

Managerial career
- 2002–2003: Cesena (youth)
- 2003–2007: Internazionale (youth teams)
- * Club domestic league appearances and goals

Fabio Calcaterra (born 13 May 1965 in Magenta) is an Italian professional football coach and a former player.

A defender, Calcaterra played professional football with F.C. Internazionale Milano, S.S. Lazio, A.C. Cesena, Catania Calcio and A.S. Bari.
