= Stefano Civeriati =

Italian footballer and coach

Personal information
- Date of birth: 7 October 1966 (age 60)
- Place of birth: Sale, Italy
- Height: 1.82 m (5 ft 11 1/2 in)
- Position: Midfielder

Senior career*
Years	Team	Apps	(Gls)
1984–1988	Internazionale	2	(0)
1984–1985	→ Imperia (loan)	23	(3)
1985–1986	→ Pavia (loan)	13	(0)
1988–1989	Catanzaro	10	(0)
1989–1990	Pavia	31	(20)
1990–1991	Venezia	43	(11)
1992–1994	Vicenza	49	(13)
1994–1996	Livorno	38	(9)
1996–1997	Derthona	26	(?)
1997–1998	Pavia	30	(6)

Managerial career
- 2001–2002: Novara
- 2005–2006: Sale Piovera
- 2006–2007: Derthona
- 2007–: Sale Piovera
- * Club domestic league appearances and goals

Stefano Civeriati (born 7 October 1966 in Sale) is an Italian professional football coach and former player.

A midfielder, Civeriati was a product of Inter Milan's youth system. He only made two Serie A appearances for the club before spending most of his career playing in Serie C.
