= Paolo Mandelli =

Italian footballer and manager

Personal information
- Full name: Paolo Andrea Mandelli
- Date of birth: 4 December 1967 (age 58)
- Place of birth: Milan, Italy
- Height: 1.70 m (5 ft 7 in)
- Position: Striker

Senior career*
Years	Team	Apps	(Gls)
1985–1987	Internazionale	1	(0)
1986–1987	→ Lazio (loan)	36	(6)
1987–1988	Sambenedettese	29	(4)
1988–1989	Messina	33	(3)
1989–1990	Reggiana	29	(0)
1990–1992	Monza	66	(16)
1992–1996	Foggia	92	(7)
1996–2001	Modena	139	(13)
2001–2003	Sassuolo	37	(6)

Managerial career
- 2011: Sassuolo
- 2024-: Modena
- * Club domestic league appearances and goals

Paolo Andrea Mandelli (born 4 December 1967 in Milan) is an Italian football coach and former player. After retiring as a player, he coached youth teams at clubs including Sassuolo. He is the current manager of Serie B club Modena.

== Club career ==
Originally a forward from the Inter youth system, Mandelli played only one senior game with the Nerazzurri; after a season on loan at Lazio, he then spent the rest of his career with minor teams such as Sambenedettese, Messina, Reggiana, Monza, Foggia and Modena. He retired in 2003 after two seasons with Sassuolo.

== Coaching career ==
After his retirement, Mandelli agreed to stay at Sassuolo as youth coach and head of the under-19 team. In 2011, he was appointed as temporary head coach on a caretaker basis, in place of sacked Angelo Gregucci, to guide the relegation-threatened club until the end of the season and keep it into Serie B. The attempt turned out to be successful, as Mandelli led Sassuolo in 15th place, and out of the relegation playoffs. He then returned to his previous duties by the end of the season and was replaced by new head coach Fulvio Pea.
