= Giuseppe Minaudo =

Italian footballer

Personal information
- Date of birth: 22 March 1967 (age 59)
- Place of birth: Mazara del Vallo, Italy
- Height: 1.72 m (5 ft 7 1/2 in)
- Position: Midfielder

Youth career
- Internazionale

Senior career*
Years	Team	Apps	(Gls)
1985–1988	Internazionale	25	(3)
1988–1989	Udinese	33	(3)
1989–1991	Ancona	58	(1)
1991–1995	Atalanta	88	(2)
1994–1995	→ Piacenza (loan)	21	(0)
1995–1996	Torino	13	(0)
1996–1997	Fidelis Andria	17	(0)
1997–1998	Cremonese	26	(0)
1998–1999	Juve Stabia	23	(0)
1999–2000	Novara	28	(0)
2000–2001	Vigor Senigallia	?	(?)
2001–2003	Ghisalbese	36	(4)
- * Club domestic league appearances and goals

Giuseppe Minaudo (born 22 March 1967 in Mazara del Vallo) is an Italian former association footballer who played as a midfielder.

== Career ==
Minaudo started his career with F.C. Internazionale Milano, and gained national popularity after he came on the pitch from the bench to score the winning goal in the Derby della Madonnina against A.C. Milan on April 6, 1986; Minaudo was aged 19, and was still part of the Primavera under-19 time at the time, thus making him a character today still popular among Inter fans.

Before to leave Internazionale in 1988, he played a total forty games with the nerazzurri, scoring three times. Since then, he played mostly at Serie A and Serie B level with teams such as Udinese, Ancona, Atalanta and Torino (the latter being his last team in the Italian top flight). In 1996, he moved down to the third tier, with Fidelis Andria, and then spent four more seasons at Serie C1 and Serie C2 level. He retired in 2003 with amateur side Ghisalbese.
