= Adriano Piraccini =

Italian footballer and manager (born 1959)

Personal information
- Date of birth: 5 March 1959 (age 67)
- Place of birth: Cesena, Italy
- Height: 1.73 m (5 ft 8 in)
- Position: Midfielder

Senior career*
| Years | Team | Apps | (Gls) |
| 1977–1984 | Cesena | 148 | (11) |
| 1984–1986 | Bari | 65 | (4) |
| 1986–1988 | Internazionale | 51 | (1) |
| 1988–1996 | Cesena | 228 | (4) |

Managerial career
- 1998–1999: Pergocrema
- 2003–2005: Cesena (youth)
- 2005: Fano
- 2006–2007: Verucchio
- 2008: Tolentino
- * Club domestic league appearances and goals

Adriano Piraccini (born 5 March 1959) is an Italian football coach and a former player, who played as a midfielder.
