= Andrea Mandorlini =

Italian footballer (born 1960)

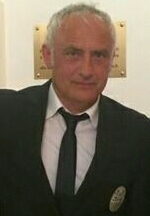
- Mandorlini in 2015

Personal information
- Full name: Andrea Mandorlini
- Date of birth: 17 July 1960 (age 66)
- Place of birth: Ravenna, Italy
- Height: 1.79 m (5 ft 10 in)
- Position: Defender

Team information
- Current team: Ravenna (head coach)

Youth career
- 1970–1978: Ravenna

Senior career*
Years	Team	Apps	(Gls)
1978–1980	Torino	27	(0)
1980–1981	Atalanta	34	(1)
1981–1984	Ascoli	73	(5)
1984–1991	Inter Milan	180	(9)
1991–1993	Udinese	42	(2)
Total		356	(17)

International career
1980	Italy U21	1	(0)

Managerial career
- 1993–1994: Manzanese
- 1994–1998: Ravenna (assistant)
- 1998–1999: Triestina
- 1999–2002: Spezia
- 2002–2003: Vicenza
- 2003–2004: Atalanta
- 2005–2006: Bologna
- 2006–2007: Padova
- 2007: Siena
- 2008–2009: Sassuolo
- 2009–2010: CFR Cluj
- 2010–2015: Hellas Verona
- 2017: Genoa
- 2018: Cremonese
- 2020–2021: Padova
- 2023: Mantova
- 2023–2024: CFR Cluj
- 2025: CFR Cluj
- 2026–: Ravenna
- * Club domestic league appearances and goals

Andrea Mandorlini (born 17 July 1960) is an Italian professional football manager and former player, currently in charge of Serie C Group B club Ravenna.

== Playing career ==
Mandorlini made his playing debut on 4 February 1979 with Torino. He left Torino in 1980 to join then-Serie B team Atalanta. After three seasons with Ascoli from 1981 to 1984, he signed for Inter, where he played until 1991. With the nerazzurri jersey, he won a Serie A championship (scudetto) in 1989 and a UEFA Cup in 1991. After two seasons with Udinese from 1991 to 1993, he announced his retirement from playing football.

== Managerial career ==
After his retirement, Mandorlini became coach of Serie D side Manzanese in 1993, but did not manage to save them from relegation. He then was in office at Ravenna as assistant manager until 1998, when he became head coach of Serie C2 team U.S. Triestina Calcio. He then joined Spezia from 1999 to 2002, winning Serie C2 at his first season and narrowly missing promotion to Serie B in 2002. After an eighth place with Vicenza in their 2002–03 Serie B campaign, he joined Atalanta and led them to promotion to Serie A. He stayed at Atalanta for the 2003–04 campaign too, but was sacked soon after the season start.

In January 2006, he was appointed at the helm of Serie B team Bologna, but was fired two months later. In December 2006, he joined Padova of Serie C1, leading them from the relegation zone to the battle for a spot in the promotion playoffs, then narrowly missed. In June 2007 he was announced as Siena boss in the 2007–08 Serie A, only to be sacked on 12 November after a poor start to the season.

In July 2008 he was announced as new head coach of newly promoted Serie B side Sassuolo. He guided the neroverdi through their debut season in the Italian second tier, leading Sassuolo to an impressive seventh place. He left Sassuolo by mutual consent in June 2009.

In November 2009 he was announced as new head coach of Romanian Liga I club CFR Cluj.

On 15 May 2010, Mandorlini guided CFR Cluj to a double: their second Romanian national title and the Romanian Cup as the first major managerial success in his career.

On 15 September 2010, Andrea Mandorlini was sacked by CFR Cluj due to a poor start in the season; his dismissal was announced only days before his UEFA Champions League debut against FC Basel. On 9 November 2010 he was announced as new head coach of Lega Pro Prima Divisione fallen giants Verona, as a replacement for dismissed boss Giuseppe Giannini.

His contract with Verona was renewed until 2014 on 11 October 2011. In his Verona stint, Mandolini succeeded in winning two promotions, bringing the team back to Serie A from the third tier, and maintaining it in a safe mid-table position throughout their 2013–14 comeback season in the top flight. On 30 November 2015, Mandorlini was sacked by Hellas after five years in charge and as the longest-serving Serie A coach at that time.

On 19 February 2017, Mandorlini returned into management as new head coach of Serie A club Genoa in place of Ivan Jurić, signing a one-and-a-half-year contract. On 10 April, Mandorlini was sacked and Jurić was reinstated.

He was hired as manager of Serie B club Cremonese on 24 April 2018. He was dismissed on 4 November 2018 following a negative start to the 2018–19 Serie B campaign.

On 20 January 2020, he returned to Padova in Serie C.

After almost two years without a job, on 21 February 2023, Mandorlini returned into management as the new head coach of Serie C club Mantova.

== Personal life ==
Mandorlini has two sons: Davide and Matteo Mandorlini. Andrea's brother, Paolo, died in a car accident in 2013.

== Managerial statistics ==
As of 20 October 2025

Managerial record by team and tenure
Team	From	To	Record							
Team	From	To	G	W	D	L	GF	GA	GD	Win %
(Italy) Triestina	17 September 1998	15 June 1999	36	16	15	5	53	32	+21	44.44
(Italy) Spezia	15 June 1999	6 June 2002	134	74	41	19	196	100	+96	55.22
(Italy) Vicenza	6 June 2002	10 June 2003	47	18	16	13	73	63	+10	38.30
(Italy) Atalanta	10 June 2003	6 December 2004	67	24	28	15	88	66	+22	35.82
(Italy) Bologna	9 November 2005	5 March 2006	17	5	7	5	17	19	−2	29.41
(Italy) Padova	18 December 2006	3 June 2007	18	9	4	5	19	12	+7	50.00
(Italy) Siena	12 June 2007	12 November 2007	13	1	6	6	13	20	−7	7.69
(Italy) Sassuolo	7 July 2008	10 June 2009	45	17	16	12	63	53	+10	37.78
(Romania) CFR Cluj	15 November 2009	12 September 2010	35	17	10	8	42	34	+8	48.57
(Italy) Hellas Verona	9 November 2010	30 November 2015	216	92	61	63	307	276	+31	42.59
(Italy) Genoa	19 February 2017	10 April 2017	6	1	1	4	3	11	−8	16.67
(Italy) Cremonese	24 April 2018	4 November 2018	16	3	9	4	20	16	+4	18.75
(Italy) Padova	20 January 2020	5 July 2021	55	31	13	11	90	41	+49	56.36
(Italy) Mantova	21 February 2023	14 June 2023	12	4	3	5	14	15	−1	33.33
(Romania) CFR Cluj	16 June 2023	24 January 2024	27	11	9	7	43	27	+16	40.74
(Romania) CFR Cluj	24 August 2025	21 October 2025	9	2	5	2	12	14	−2	22.22
(Italy) Ravenna	13 February 2026	present	4	2	2	0	4	1	+3	50.00
Total			757	327	246	184	1,057	800	+257	43.20

== Honours ==
=== Player ===
Inter Milan

- Serie A: 1988–89
- Supercoppa Italiana: 1989
- UEFA Cup: 1990–91

=== Coach ===
Spezia

- Serie C2: 1999–2000

CFR Cluj

- Liga I: 2009–10
- Cupa României: 2009–10
- Supercupa României: 2010

== Sources ==
- "FootballPlus – Andrea Mandorlini". FootballPlus. Archived from the original on 8 June 2007.
- "TuttoCalciatori.Net – Andrea Mandorlini" (in Italian). TuttoCalciatori.Net.
