= 1979–80 Inter Milan season =

Inter Milan
1979–80 season
- President: Ivanoe Fraizzoli
- Manager: Eugenio Bersellini
- Stadium: Giuseppe Meazza
- Serie A: 1st (In European Cup)
- Coppa Italia: Quarter-finals
- UEFA Cup: Round of 32
- Top goalscorer: League: Altobelli (15); All: Altobelli (22)
Home colours	Away colours
- All statistics correct as of 11 May 1980.

== Season ==
Mazzola and Beltrami acquired on transfers, Roberto Mozzini (centre-back) and Domenico Caso (right winger) for a team who - in previous years - was told did not win due to the lack of planning. The line-up was completed by: Bordon (goalkeeper), Baresi and Pasinato (right and left full-back), Bini (sweeper and captain), Oriali (half-back), Marini (midfielder), Beccalossi (playmaker), Muraro (left winger) and Altobelli (centre-forward).

Inter retained the top of the league since matchday 1, beating Pescara 2–0. Autumnal highlights resulted to be the wins over AC Milan (2–0 with both goals scored by Beccalossi) and Juventus (4–0 with a hat-trick of Altobelli and a goal for Muraro). Toward the end of the first half, Inter lost some points losing to Roma and drawing with Fiorentina and Ascoli. However, by mid-season Inter was in first place with 21 points, two over the reigning champion of Milan. In the second half of the league, Inter earned another 20 points leaving all opponents behind. Their 12th Scudetto was won on 27 April 1980, with a 2–2 draw against Roma in which Mozzini scored his only goal of his Inter career. The final record was of 14 wins, 13 draws and three losses for a total of 41 points, three more than Juventus (38) and five more than Milan (36). During the 30 games, the side scored 44 goals with 11 different players (in order: Oriali, Altobelli, Beccalossi, Marini, Bini, Muraro, Pasinato, Baresi, Caso, Ambu and Mozzini). Altobelli hit the target for 15 times: just Roberto Bettega managed to do better, scoring 16 goals.

== Squad ==
Note: Flags indicate national team as defined under FIFA eligibility rules; some limited exceptions apply. Players may hold more than one non-FIFA nationality.

Pos.	Nation	Player
GK	ITA	Ivano Bordon
GK	ITA	Renato Cipollini
DF	ITA	Roberto Mozzini
DF	ITA	Giuseppe Baresi
DF	ITA	Giuseppe Bergomi
DF	ITA	Graziano Bini
DF	ITA	Nazzareno Canuti
DF	ITA	Gabriele Oriali
DF	ITA	Franco Pancheri

Pos.	Nation	Player
DF	ITA	Giancarlo Pasinato
MF	ITA	Evaristo Beccalossi
MF	ITA	Domenico Caso
MF	ITA	Giampiero Marini
MF	ITA	Carlo Muraro
MF	ITA	Leonardo Occhipinti
FW	ITA	Alessandro Altobelli
FW	ITA	Claudio Ambu

== Competitions ==
=== Serie A ===
==== League table ====
Pos	Team	Pld	W	D	L	GF	GA	GD	Pts	Qualification or relegation
1	Inter (C)	30	14	13	3	44	25	+19	41	Qualification to European Cup
2	Juventus	30	16	6	8	42	25	+17	38	Qualification to UEFA Cup
3	Torino (Note: A.C. Milan and S.S. Lazio placed in the last position and relegated to Serie B by FIGC because of the Totonero 1980 scandal. Torino qualified to UEFA Cup instead of Milan.)	30	11	13	6	26	15	+11	35	Qualification to UEFA Cup
4	Ascoli	30	11	12	7	35	28	+7	34	
5	Fiorentina	30	11	11	8	33	27	+6	33	

Source: RSSSF.com
Rules for classification: 1) Points; 2) Head-to-head points; 3) Head-to-head goal difference; 4) Goal difference; 5) Goals scored; 6) Draw. (Note: Head-to-head record is used only after all the matches between the teams in question have been played).
Goal difference is used in case of equal points.
(C) Champions

==== Results by round ====
Round	1	2	3	4	5	6	7	8	9	10	11	12	13	14	15	16	17	18	19	20	21	22	23	24	25	26	27	28	29	30
Ground	H	A	H	A	H	A	H	A	A	H	A	H	A	H	A	A	H	A	H	A	H	A	H	H	A	H	A	H	A	H
Result	W	D	W	L	D	W	W	L	L	W	L	W	L	L	L	D	W	W	W	W	D	D	D	W	L	W	W	W	W	W
Position	1	1	2	1	1	1	1	1	1	1	1	1	1	1	1	1	1	1	1	1	1	1	1	1	1	1	1	1	1	1

Source: Competitive matches
A = Away; H = Home; W = Win; D = Draw; L = Loss; P = Postponed; = Leader, 1980–81 European Cup; = 1980–81 UEFA Cup; = 1980-81 Serie B; R = 1980-81 UEFA Cup Winners' Cup

==== Matches ====
16 September 1979 1	Inter Milan	2–0	Pescara	Milan
	Domenichini 12' (o.g.); Oriali 69'	Report		Stadium: San Siro

23 September 1979 2	Udinese	1–1	Inter Milan	Udine
	Vagheggi 89'	Report	28' Altobelli	Stadium: Friuli

30 September 1979 3	Inter Milan	2–1	Lazio	Milan
	Beccalossi 17'; Marini 71'	Report	42' Giordano	Stadium: San Siro

7 October 1979 4	Bologna	1–2	Inter Milan	Bologna
	Mastropasqua 7'	Report	36' Bini; 40' Beccalossi	Stadium: Renato Dall'Ara

14 October 1979 5	Inter Milan	1–0	Napoli	Milan
	Altobelli 61'	Report		Stadium: San Siro

21 October 1979 6	Catanzaro	0–0	Inter Milan	Catanzaro
		Report		Stadium: Stadio Comunale

28 October 1979 7	Inter Milan	2–0	AC Milan	Milan
	Beccalossi 14', 84'	Report		Stadium: San Siro

4 November 1979 8	Torino	0–0	Inter Milan	Turin
		Report		Stadium: Stadio Comunale

11 November 1979 9	Inter Milan	4–0	Juventus	Milan
	Altobelli 48', 50', 79'; Muraro 74'	Report		Stadium: San Siro

25 November 1979 10	Avellino	0–0	Inter Milan	Avellino
		Report		Stadium: Stadio Partenio

2 December 1979 11	Cagliari	1–1	Inter Milan	Cagliari
	Selvaggi 63'	Report	76' Altobelli	Stadium: Stadio Sant'Elia

9 December 1979 12	Inter Milan	3–2	Perugia	Milan
	Beccalossi 4'; Altobelli 75' (pen.); Pasinato 87'	Report	Rossi 19'; Rossi 89'	Stadium: San Siro

16 December 1979 13	Roma	1–0	Inter Milan	Rome
	Di Bartolomei 61'	Report		Stadium: Olimpico

30 December 1979 14	Inter Milan	0–0	Fiorentina	Milan
		Report		Stadium: San Siro

6 January 1980 15	Ascoli	1–1	Inter Milan	Ascoli Piceno
	Anastasi 59'	Report	3' Altobelli	Stadium: Stadio Cino e Lillo Del Duca

13 January 1980 16	Pescara	0–2	Inter Milan	Pescara
		Report	34' Beccalossi; 62' Pasinato	Stadium: Stadio Adriatico

20 January 1980 17	Inter Milan	2–1	Udinese	Milan
	Altobelli 42', 51' (pen.)	Report	45' Ulivieri	Stadium: San Siro

27 January 1980 18	Lazio	0–0	Inter Milan	Roma
		Report		Stadium: Stadio Olimpico

3 February 1980 19	Inter Milan	0–0	Bologna	Milan
		Report		Stadium: San Siro

10 February 1980 20	Napoli	3–4	Inter Milan	Naples
	Pasinato 22' (o.g.); Improta 35'; Guidetti 81'	Report	19', 32' Muraro; 57' Altobelli; 71' Baresi	Stadium: Stadio San Paolo

24 February 1980 21	Inter Milan	3–1	Cartanzaro	Milan
	Beccalossi 15'; Oriali 36'; Altobelli 60'	Report	78' Bresciani	Stadium: San Siro

2 March 1980 22	AC Milan	0–1	Inter Milan	Milan
		Report	77' Oriali	Stadium: San Siro

9 March 1980 23	Inter Milan	1–1	Torino	Milan
	Muraro 82'	Report	20' Graziani	Stadium: Giuseppe Meazza

23 March 1980 24	Juventus	2–0	Inter Milan	Turin
	Bettega 32'; Fanna 79'	Report		Stadium: Stadio Comunale

30 March 1980 25	Inter Milan	3–0	Avellino	Milan
	Caso 16'; Romano 68' (o.g.); Ambu 82'	Report		Stadium: Giuseppe Meazza

5 April 1980 26	Inter Milan	3–3	Cagliari	Milan
	Muraro 33'; Oriali 49'; Altobelli 57'	Report	3' (o.g.) Baresi; 6' Selvaggi; 50' (o.g.) Mozzini	Stadium: Giuseppe Meazza

13 April 1980 27	Perugia	0–0	Inter Milan	Perugia
		Report		Stadium: Stadio Renato Curi

27 April 1980 28	Inter Milan	2–2	Roma	Milan
	Oriali 36'; Mozzini 88'	Report	18' Pruzzo; 43' Turone	Stadium: Giuseppe Meazza

4 May 1980 29	Fiorentina	0–2	Inter Milan	Florence
		Report	6' Oriali; 39' (o.g.) Restelli	Stadium: Stadio Comunale

11 May 1980 30	Inter Milan	2–4	Ascoli	Milan
	Altobelli 58', 73' (pen.)	Report	25' Torrisi; 44' (o.g.) Marini; 55' Bellotto; 66' Anastasi	Stadium: Giuseppe Meazza

=== Coppa Italia ===
Group stage

Pos	Team	Pld	W	D	L	GF	GA	GD	Pts
1	Internazionale	4	4	0	0	11	2	+9	8
2	SPAL	4	2	1	1	3	4	−1	5
3	Bologna	4	2	0	2	5	4	+1	4
4	Atalanta	4	0	2	2	1	5	−4	2
5	Sambenedettese	4	0	1	3	1	6	−5	1

29 August 1979 2	Bologna	1–3	Inter Milan	Bologna
	Castronaro 28'		36' Muraro; 66' (pen.) Altobelli; 87' Baresi	Stadium: Renato Dall'Ara

2 September 1979 3	Inter Milan	3–0	SPAL	Piacenza
	Beccalossi 31'; Oriali 70'; Altobelli 77'			Stadium: Stadio Galleana

5 September 1979 4	Inter Milan	3–1	Sambenedettese	Como
	Caso 70'; Pasinato 86'; Altobelli 88' (pen.)		82' Bozzi	Stadium: Giuseppe Sinigaglia

9 September 1979 5	Atalanta	0–2	Inter Milan	Bergamo
			16' Altobelli; 36' Muraro	Stadium: Atleti Azzurri d'Italia

Quarterfinals

28 November 1979	Inter Milan	1–2	Juventus	Milan
	Pancheri 60'		27' Prandelli; 76' (o.g.) Occhipinti	Stadium: Giuseppe Meazza

30 January 1980	Juventus	0–0 (2–1 agg.)	Inter Milan	Turin
				Stadium: Comunale

=== UEFA Cup ===
First round

19 September 1979	Inter Milan	3–0	(Spain) Real Sociedad	Milan
	Muraro 46'; Baresi 48'; Marini 78'			Stadium: Giuseppe Meazza; Attendance: 60 000; Referee: (Portugal) Garrido

3 October 1979	(Spain) Real Sociedad	2–0	Inter Milan	San Sebastián
	Satrústegui 21', 73'			Stadium: Atotxa; Referee: (England) Partridge

Second round

24 October 1979	(Germany) Borussia Mönchengladbach	1–1	Inter Milan	Mönchengladbach
	Hannes 46'		55' Altobelli	Stadium: Bökelbergstadion; Attendance: 38 000; Referee: (France) Wurtz

7 November 1979	Inter Milan	2–3 (3–4 aet agg.)	(Germany) Borussia Mönchengladbach	Milan
	Altobelli 25', 92'		Nickel 37'; Ringels 103'; Nickel 110' (pen.)	Stadium: Giuseppe Meazza; Referee: (Hungary) Palotai

== Statistics ==
=== League result ===
Overall								Home						Away					
Pld	W	D	L	GF	GA	GD	Pts	W	D	L	GF	GA	GD	W	D	L	GF	GA	GD
30	14	13	3	44	25	+19	55	9	5	1	30	15	+15	5	8	2	14	10	+4

2 points were awarded for every win, so Inter collected 41 points instead 56.

=== Player statistics ===
Appearances and goals are referred to domestic league.

No.	Pos	Nat	Player	Total		1979-80 Serie A	
No.	Pos	Nat	Player	Apps	Goals	Apps	Goals
	GK	(Italy) ITA	Ivano Bordon	30	-25	29+1	-25
	DF	(Italy) ITA	Gabriele Oriali	25	6	25	6
	DF	(Italy) ITA	Giuseppe Baresi	30	1	29+1	1
	DF	(Italy) ITA	Graziano Bini	28	1	28	1
	DF	(Italy) ITA	Nazzareno Canuti	26	0	25+1	0
	MF	(Italy) ITA	Giampiero Marini	29	1	28+1	1
	MF	(Italy) ITA	Evaristo Beccalossi	27	7	26+1	7
	MF	(Italy) ITA	Domenico Caso	29	1	26+3	1
	MF	(Italy) ITA	Giancarlo Pasinato	27	2	27	2
	FW	(Italy) ITA	Carlo Muraro	24	5	22+2	5
	FW	(Italy) ITA	Alessandro Altobelli	29	15	28+1	15
	GK	(Italy) ITA	Renato Cipollini	1	0	1	0
	DF	(Italy) ITA	Roberto Mozzini	22	1	22	1
	DF	(Italy) ITA	Giuseppe Bergomi	0	0	0	0
	DF	(Italy) ITA	Franco Pancheri	17	0	3+14	0
	MF	(Italy) ITA	Leonardo Occhipinti	1	0	1	0
	FW	(Italy) ITA	Claudio Ambu	13	1	10+3	1

- Source: http://calcio-seriea.net/tabellini/1979/13490/

== Sources ==
- RSSSF Italy 1979/80
