= 1980–81 Inter Milan season =

Inter Milan
1980–81 season
- Chairman: Ivanoe Fraizzoli
- Manager: Eugenio Bersellini
- Stadium: Giuseppe Meazza
- Serie A: 4th (in UEFA Cup)
- Coppa Italia: First round
- European Cup: Semifinals
- Top goalscorer: League: Altobelli (12); All: Altobelli (22)
Home colours	Away colours	Third colours

The 1980–81 season was Inter Milan's 72nd in existence and 65th consecutive season in the top flight of Italian football.

== Summary ==
During the summer, the club acquired Herbert Prohaska from Austria Vienna, the Austrian becoming the first foreign transfer since 1966. The squad was eliminated from the Coppa Italia in early September despite defeating city rivals AC Milan. As incumbent champions the team closed the first half of the season as leader. However, the team collapsed in the second half to finish 4th in the lag, far behind Juventus and A.S. Roma. The campaign saw the league debut of club legend Giuseppe Bergomi in February against Como. Meanwhile, atter a 9-year absence, the club returned to the European Cup, where it reached the semi-finals, being defeated by Real Madrid. Alessandro Altobelli finished the campaign as the top scorer with 12 goals in League.

== Squad ==
Note: Flags indicate national team as defined under FIFA eligibility rules; some limited exceptions apply. Players may hold more than one non-FIFA nationality.

Pos.	Nation	Player
GK	ITA	Ivano Bordon
GK	ITA	Renato Cipollini
DF	ITA	Roberto Mozzini
DF	ITA	Giuseppe Baresi
DF	ITA	Giuseppe Bergomi
DF	ITA	Graziano Bini
DF	ITA	Nazzareno Canuti
DF	ITA	Gabriele Oriali
DF	ITA	Franco Pancheri
DF	ITA	Antonio Tempestilli

Pos.	Nation	Player
DF	ITA	Giancarlo Pasinato
MF	AUT	Herbert Prohaska
MF	ITA	Evaristo Beccalossi
MF	ITA	Domenico Caso
MF	ITA	Giampiero Marini
MF	ITA	Carlo Muraro
MF	ITA	Leonardo Occhipinti
FW	ITA	Alessandro Altobelli
FW	ITA	Claudio Ambu
FW	ITA	Angelo Crialesi
FW	ITA	Amerigo Paradiso

=== Transfers ===
In
Pos.	Name	from	Type
DF	Giuseppe Bergomi		
MF	Herbert Prohaska	Austria Vienna	

Out
Pos.	Name	to	Type
MF	Leonardo Occhipinti	Pisa Calcio	

== Competitions ==
=== Serie A ===
==== League table ====
Pos	Team	Pld	W	D	L	GF	GA	GD	Pts	Qualification or relegation
2	Roma	30	14	14	2	43	20	+23	42	Qualification to Cup Winners' Cup
3	Napoli	30	14	10	6	31	21	+10	38	Qualification to UEFA Cup
4	Internazionale	30	14	8	8	41	24	+17	36	Qualification to UEFA Cup
5	Fiorentina	30	9	14	7	28	25	+3	32	
6	Cagliari	30	8	14	8	29	30	−1	30	

Source: Panini

==== Results by round ====
Round	1	2	3	4	5	6	7	8	9	10	11	12	13	14	15	16	17	18	19	20	21	22	23	24	25	26	27	28	29	30
Ground	H	A	H	A	H	A	H	A	H	A	A	H	H	A	H	A	H	A	H	A	H	A	H	A	H	H	A	A	H	A
Result	W	W	L	W	D	L	W	L	W	D	D	W	D	W	D	W	D	W	L	L	L	W	W	L	D	W	L	W	W	D
Position	1	1	3	2	1	3	2	2	2	2	2	2	2	2	2	1	2	1	4	4	4	4	4	4	4	4	4	4	4	4

Source: Competitive matches
A = Away; H = Home; W = Win; D = Draw; L = Loss; P = Postponed; = Leader, 1981–82 European Cup; = 1981–82 UEFA Cup; = 1981-82 Serie B; R = 1981-82 UEFA Cup Winners' Cup

==== Matches ====
14 September 1980 1	Udinese	0–4	Inter Milan	Udine
			13' Pasinato; 28' Bini; 54' Muraro; 73' Altobelli	Stadium: Friuli; Referee: D'Elia

21 September 1980 2	Inter Milan	4–1	Cagliari Calcio	Milan
	Muraro 5', 74'; Beccalossi 7'; Altobelli 38' (pen.)		21' Selvaggi	Stadium: Giuseppe Meazza; Referee: Arnaldo Prati

28 September 1980 3	Como Calcio	1–0	Inter Milan	Como
	Lombardi 45'			Stadium: Giuseppe Sinigaglia; Referee: Gianfranco Menegali

5 October 1980 4	Inter Milan	3–0	Napoli	Milan
	Altobelli 9'; Oriali 78'; Krol 86' (o.g.)			Stadium: Giuseppe Meazza; Referee: Bergamo

19 October 1980 5	Fiorentina	0–0	Inter Milan	Florence
				Stadium: Comunale; Referee: Maurizio Mattei

26 October 1980 6	Inter Milan	2–4	AS Roma	Milan
	Altobelli 57', 89' (pen.)		2' (o.g.) Bini; 12', 32', 80' (pen.) R.Pruzzo	Stadium: Giuseppe Meazza; Referee: Barbaresco

9 November 1980 7	Inter Milan	2–0	Pistoiese	Milan
	Altobelli 3', 84' (pen.)			Stadium: Giuseppe Meazza; Referee: Pietro D'Elia

23 November 1980 8	Juventus	2–1	Inter Milan	Turin
	Brady 51' (pen.); Scirea 69'		79' Ambu	Stadium: Comunale; Referee: Michelotti

30 November 1980 9	Inter Milan	1–0	Bologna F.C.	Milan
	Altobelli 68'			Stadium: Giuseppe Meazza; Referee: Massimo Ciulli

14 December 1980 10	Brescia Calcio	0–0	Inter Milan	Brescia
				Stadium: Mario Rigamonti; Referee: Carlo Longhi

21 December 1980 11	Inter Milan	1–1	Torino	Milan
	Ambu 41'		21' Graziani	Stadium: Giuseppe Meazza; Referee: Maurizio Mattei

28 December 1980 12	Ascoli Calcio	0–1	Inter Milan	Ascoli Piceno
			10' Beccalossi	Stadium: Cino e Lillo Del Duca; Referee: Riccardo Lattanzi

18 January 1981 13	Inter Milan	0–0	Avellino	Milan
				Stadium: Giuseppe Meazza; Referee: Alberto Michelotti

25 January 1981 14	Perugia Calcio	0–2	Inter Milan	Perugia
			19', 75' Oriali	Stadium: Renato Curi; Referee: Claudio Pieri

1 February 1981 15	Inter Milan	2–2	Catanzaro	Milan
	Prohaska 30'; Beccalossi 35'		18' (o.g.) Canuti; 78' De Giorgis	Stadium: Giuseppe Meazza; Referee: Giancarlo Redini

8 February 1981 16	Inter Milan	2–0	Udinese Calcio	Milan
	Prohaska 8'; Altobelli 38'			Stadium: Giuseppe Meazza; Referee: Domenico Lops

15 February 1981 17	Cagliari Calcio	1–1	Inter Milan	Cagliari
	Virdis 56'		15' (o.g.) Tavola	Stadium: Sant'Elia; Referee: Enzo Barbaresco

22 February 1981 18	Inter Milan	2–1	Como Calcio	Milan
	Ambu 7'; Prohaska 81'		41' Gobbo	Stadium: Giuseppe Meazza; Referee: Maurizio Mattei

1 March 1981 19	Napoli	1–0	Inter Milan	Naples
	Guidetti 14'			Stadium: San Paolo; Referee: Alberto Michelotti

8 March 1981 20	Inter Milan	1–2	Fiorentina	Milan
	Altobelli 25'		44' Guerini; 48' Bertoni	Stadium: Giuseppe Meazza; Referee: Luigi Agnolin

15 March 1981 21	AS Roma	1–0	Inter Milan	Rome
	Pruzzo 86'			Stadium: Olimpico; Referee: Paolo Bergamo

22 March 1981 22	Pistoiese	1–2	Inter Milan	Pistoia
	V. Chimenti 34'		65', 74' (pen.) Beccalossi	Stadium: Comunale; Referee: Arnaldo Prati

29 March 1981 23	Inter Milan	1–0	Juventus	Milan
	Muraro 61'			Stadium: Giuseppe Meazza; Referee: Enzo Barbaresco

4 April 1981 24	Bologna F.C.	2–1	Inter Milan	Bologna
	Fabbri 40'; Dossena 58'		77' (pen.) Beccalossi	Stadium: Comunale; Referee: Paolo Bergamo

12 April 1981 25	Inter Milan	0–0	Brescia Calcio	Milan
				Stadium: Giuseppe Meazza; Referee: Riccardo Lattanzi

26 April 1981 26	Torino	0–1	Inter Milan	Turin
			19' Prohaska	Stadium: Comunale; Referee: Massimo Ciulli

3 May 1981 27	Inter Milan	1–2	Ascoli Calcio	Milan
	Bini 81'		25' (pen.) A. Moro; 47' Scanziani	Stadium: Giuseppe Meazza; Referee: Pietro D'Elia

10 May 1981 28	Avellino	1–3	Inter Milan	Avellino
	Vignola 77'		15' Caso; 32' Altobelli; 63' Oriali	Stadium: Stadio Partenio; Referee: Carlo Longhi

17 May 1981 29	Inter Milan	3–1	Perugia Calcio	Milan
	Beccalossi 4'; Prohaska 20'; Altobelli 65' (pen.)		81' Fortunato	Stadium: Giuseppe Meazza; Referee: Luigi Altobelli

24 May 1981 30	Catanzaro	0–0	Inter Milan	Catanzaro
				Stadium: Militare; Referee: Roberto Bianciardi

=== Coppa Italia ===
==== First round ====
Group 2
Pos	Team	Pld	W	D	L	GF	GA	GD	Pts
1	Avellino	4	2	2	0	7	3	+4	6
2	Palermo	4	3	0	1	6	4	+2	6
3	Internazionale	4	1	2	1	3	3	0	4
4	Milan	4	1	1	2	2	3	−1	3
5	Catania	4	0	1	3	3	8	−5	1

===== Matches =====
20 August 1980 1	Catania Calcio	0–0	Inter Milan	Catania
				Stadium: Cibali; Referee: Massimo Ciulli

31 August 1980 3	Inter Milan	1–2	Palermo F.C.	Milan
	Muraro 56'		25' Calloni; 60' De Stefanis	Stadium: Giuseppe Meazza; Referee: Romeo Paparesta

3 September 1980 4	Inter Milan	1–1	Avellino	Milan
	Muraro 79'		84' Vignola	Stadium: Giuseppe Meazza; Referee: Rosario Lo Bello

7 September 1980 5	AC Milan	0–1	Inter Milan	Milan
			66' Altobelli	Stadium: Giuseppe Meazza; Referee: Riccardo Lattanzi

=== European Cup ===
==== First round ====
17 September 1980	Inter (Italy)	2–0	(Romania) Universitatea Craiova	Milan
20:45 CET	Altobelli 8' (pen.), 60'	Report		Stadium: Giuseppe Meazza; Referee: (East Germany) Stumpf

1 October 1980	Universitatea Craiova (Romania)	1–1	(Italy) Inter	Craiova
20:45 CET	Beldeanu 18'	Report	8' Muraro	Stadium: Stadionul Central; Referee: (Turkey) Tokat

==== Eightfinals ====
22 October 1980	FC Nantes (France)	1–2	(Italy) Inter	Nantes
20:30 CET	Rio 69' (pen.)	Report	12' Altobelli; 85' Prohaska	Stadium: Marcel-Saupin; Referee: (Czechoslovakia) Christov

5 November 1980	Inter (Italy)	1–1	(France) FC Nantes	Milan
20:45 CET	Altobelli 29'	Report	75' Amisse	Stadium: Giuseppe Meazza; Referee: (West Germany) Aldinger

==== Quarterfinals ====
4 March 1981	Inter (Italy)	1–1	(Socialist Federal Republic of Yugoslavia) Crvena Zvezda	Milan
20:45 CET	Caso 45+2'	Report	75' Repčić	Stadium: Giuseppe Meazza; Referee: (Hungary) Palotai

18 March 1981	Crvena Zvezda (Socialist Federal Republic of Yugoslavia)	0–1	(Italy) Inter	Belgrado
17:30 CET		Report	13' Muraro	Stadium: Red Star; Referee: (France) Vautrot

==== Semifinals ====
8 April 1981	Real Madrid (Spain)	2–0	(Italy) Inter	Madrid
20:45 CET	Santillana 29'; Juanito 47'	Report		Stadium: Santiago Bernabeu; Attendance: 100,000; Referee: (Netherlands) Corver

22 April 1981	Inter (Italy)	1–0	(Spain) Real Madrid	Milan
20:45 CET	Bini 56'	Report		Stadium: Giuseppe Meazza; Attendance: 85,000; Referee: (Belgium) Ponnet

== Statistics ==
=== Player statistics ===
Appearances and goals are referred to domestic league.

No.	Pos	Nat	Player	Total		1980-81 Serie A	
No.	Pos	Nat	Player	Apps	Goals	Apps	Goals
	GK	(Italy) ITA	Ivano Bordon	30	-24	30	-24
	DF	(Italy) ITA	Gabriele Oriali	18	4	18	4
	DF	(Italy) ITA	Giuseppe Baresi	26	0	25+1	0
	DF	(Italy) ITA	Graziano Bini	25	2	25	2
	DF	(Italy) ITA	Nazzareno Canuti	25	0	25	0
	MF	(Italy) ITA	Giampiero Marini	27	0	27	0
	MF	(Italy) ITA	Evaristo Beccalossi	27	7	27	7
	MF	(Italy) ITA	Domenico Caso	28	1	24+4	1
	MF	(Italy) ITA	Giancarlo Pasinato	23	1	16+7	1
	FW	(Austria) AUT	Herbert Prohaska	28	5	28	5
	FW	(Italy) ITA	Alessandro Altobelli	29	12	28+1	12
	GK	(Italy) ITA	Renato Cipollini	1	0	0+1	0
	FW	(Italy) ITA	Carlo Muraro	21	4	16+5	4
	DF	(Italy) ITA	Roberto Mozzini	18	0	15+3	0
	DF	(Italy) ITA	Giuseppe Bergomi	12	0	11+1	0
	FW	(Italy) ITA	Claudio Ambu	19	3	8+11	3
	DF	(Italy) ITA	Antonio Tempestilli	5	0	4+1	0
	DF	(Italy) ITA	Franco Pancheri	11	0	3+8	0
	MF	(Italy) ITA	Fausto Pari	1	0	0+1	0
	FW	(Italy) ITA	Angelo Crialesi	0	0	0	0
	FW	(Italy) ITA	Amerigo Paradiso	1	0	0+1	0

- Source: http://calcio-seriea.net/presenze/1980/849/

== Sources ==
- RSSSF Italy 1980/81
