= 1981–82 Inter Milan season =

Inter Milan
1981–82 season
- Chairman: Ernesto Pellegrini
- Manager: Eugenio Bersellini
- Serie A: 5th
- Coppa Italia: Winner
- UEFA Cup: Round of 32
- Top goalscorer: League: Alessandro Altobelli (9); All: Alessandro Altobelli (21)
Home colours	Away colours
- All statistics correct as of 20 May 1982.

The 1981–82 Inter Milan season was Football Club Internazionale Milano's 73rd in existence and 66th consecutive season in the top flight of Italian football.

== Season ==
The 1981–82 season saw Inter win the Coppa Italia, the second in four years and the third overall. The final opponent was Torino, which were beaten 1–0 in first leg and drew 1–1 in the second. Inter showed some new faces, such as the young Giuseppe Bergomi and Riccardo Ferri (both born in 1963), Salvatore Bagni and Aldo Serena, who returned after several loans.

Inter also reached the round of 32 in UEFA Cup - giving up in front of Dinamo Bucharest during overtime - and achieved fifth place in the domestic league, but the triumph in the Coppa Italia resulted in a qualification for the UEFA Cup Winners' Cup.

== Squad ==
Date of birth and role are between brackets. Note: Flags indicate national team as defined under FIFA eligibility rules; some limited exceptions apply. Players may hold more than one non-FIFA nationality.

Pos.	Nation	Player
GK	ITA	Ivano Bordon
GK	ITA	Renato Cipollini
GK	ITA	Angelo Pizzetti
DF	ITA	Klaus Bachlechner
DF	ITA	Giuseppe Baresi
DF	ITA	Giuseppe Bergomi
DF	ITA	Graziano Bini
DF	ITA	Nazzareno Canuti
DF	ITA	Giancarlo Centi
DF	ITA	Riccardo Ferri

Pos.	Nation	Player
DF	ITA	Claudio Lombardo
DF	ITA	Gabriele Oriali
DF	ITA	Giancarlo Pasinato
MF	ITA	Salvatore Bagni
MF	ITA	Evaristo Beccalossi
MF	ITA	Giampiero Marini
MF	AUT	Herbert Prohaska
MF	ITA	Luigi Rocca
MF	ITA	Aldo Serena
FW	ITA	Claudio Fermanelli
FW	ITA	Alessandro Altobelli

=== Transfers ===
In
Pos.	Name	from	Type
DF	Giancarlo Centi	Como	-
FW	Aldo Serena	AS Bari	-

Out
Pos.	Name	To	Type
MF	Maurizio Restelli	Cagliari	

== Competitions ==
=== Serie A ===
==== League table ====
Pos	Team	Pld	W	D	L	GF	GA	GD	Pts	Qualification or relegation
3	Roma	30	15	8	7	40	29	+11	38	Qualification to UEFA Cup
4	Napoli (Note: Napoli obtained a UEFA spot for the Albanian political renounce.)	30	10	15	5	31	21	+10	35	Qualification to UEFA Cup
5	Internazionale	30	11	13	6	39	34	+5	35	Qualification to Cup Winners' Cup
6	Ascoli	30	9	14	7	26	21	+5	32	
7	Catanzaro	30	9	10	11	25	29	−4	28	

Source: RSSSF.com
Rules for classification: 1) points; 2) Head-to-head points; 3) goal difference; 4) number of goals scored.

==== Results by round ====
Round	1	2	3	4	5	6	7	8	9	10	11	12	13	14	15	16	17	18	19	20	21	22	23	24	25	26	27	28	29	30
Ground	H	A	H	A	H	A	H	A	H	H	A	H	A	H	A	A	H	A	H	A	H	A	H	A	A	H	A	H	A	H
Result	D	D	W	D	W	W	D	D	W	W	L	D	L	W	W	D	D	W	L	W	W	D	D	L	D	D	L	D	L	W
Position	4	5	2	2	2	2	3	3	2	1	1	2	3	3	3	3	3	3	3	3	3	3	3	3	3	3	4	4	5	5

Source: Competitive matches
A = Away; H = Home; W = Win; D = Draw; L = Loss; P = Postponed; = Leader, 1982–83 European Cup; = 1982–83 UEFA Cup; = 1982-83 Serie B; R = 1982-83 UEFA Cup Winners' Cup

==== Matches ====
13 September 1981 1	Inter Milan	0–0	Ascoli	Milan
				Stadium: Giuseppe Meazza; Referee: Lo Bello

20 September 1981 2	Catanzaro Calcio	0–0	Inter Milan	Catanzaro
				Stadium: Comunale; Referee: Menegali

27 September 1981 3	Inter Milan	1–0	Torino	Milan
	Beccalossi 56' (pen.)			Stadium: Giuseppe Meazza; Referee: Agnolin

4 October 1981 4	Cagliari	1–1	Inter Milan	Cagliari
	Piras 49'		64' Beccalossi	Stadium: Sant'Elia; Referee: Longhi

11 October 1981 5	Inter Milan	3–2	Cesena	Milan
	Altobelli 17'; Beccalossi 19' (pen.); Pasinato 24'		3' Schachner; 59' Perego	Stadium: Giuseppe Meazza; Referee: Lops

25 October 1981 6	AC Milan	0–1	Inter Milan	Milan
			69' Oriali	Stadium: San Siro; Referee: Barbaresco

1 November 1981 7	Inter Milan	0–0	Genoa	Milan
				Stadium: Giuseppe Meazza; Referee: D'Elia

8 November 1981 8	Udinese	1–1	Inter Milan	Udine
	Bacchin 37'		54' Altobelli	Stadium: Friuli; Referee: Menegali

22 November 1981 9	Inter Milan	3–2	Roma	Milan
	Baresi I 16'; Beccalossi 26' (pen.); Altobelli 68'		Pruzzo 18'; Conti 21'	Stadium: Giuseppe Meazza; Referee: Agnolin

29 November 1981 10	Inter Milan	4–0	Como	Milan
	Prohaska 31'; Oriali 48'; Beccalossi 58' (pen.); Bagni 85'			Stadium: Giuseppe Meazza; Referee: Pieri

13 December 1981 11	Napoli	2–0	Inter Milan	Naples
	Musella 33'; Pellegrini III 39'			Stadium: San Paolo; Referee: Barbaresco

20 December 1981 12	Inter Milan	0–0	Juventus	Milan
				Stadium: Giuseppe Meazza; Referee: D'Elia

3 January 1982 13	Fiorentina	4–2	Inter Milan	Florence
	Bertoni 25', 50' (pen.); Graziani 57'; Pecci 65'		Serena 48'; Serena 62'	Stadium: Comunale; Referee: Menegali

10 January 1982 14	Inter Milan	2–1	Bologna	Milan
	Bergomi 34'; Altobelli 76'		79' Fiorini	Stadium: Giuseppe Meazza; Referee: Pieri

17 January 1982 15	Avellino	0–1	Inter Milan	Avellino
			Altobelli 79'	Stadium: Partenio; Referee: Redini

24 January 1982 16	Ascoli	2–2	Inter Milan	Ascoli Piceno
	Pircher 46'; Pircher 70'		Bagni 74'; Bergomi 90'	Stadium: Cino e Lillo Del Duca; Referee: Bergamo

31 January 1982 17	Inter Milan	1–1	Catanzaro Calcio	Milan
	Oriali 30'		Bivi 41'	Stadium: Giuseppe Meazza; Referee: Prati

7 February 1982 18	Torino	0–1	Inter Milan	Turin
			Beccalossi 36' (pen.)	Stadium: Comunale; Referee: Agnolin

14 February 1982 19	Inter Milan	1–3	Cagliari	Milan
	Bagni 49'		29', 65' Piras; 62' Quagliozzi	Stadium: Giuseppe Meazza; Referee: Bergamo (Livorno)

28 February 1982 20	Cesena	1–3	Inter Milan	Cesena
	Schachner 64'		4', 34' (pen.) Beccalossi; 74' Oriali	Stadium: Stadio Dino Manuzzi; Referee: Redini (Pisa)

7 March 1982 21	Inter Milan	2–1	Milan	Milan
	Prohaska 10'; Altobelli 32'		17' (o.g.) Prohaska	Stadium: Giuseppe Meazza; Referee: Agnolin (Bassano del Grappa)

14 March 1982 22	Genoa	1–1	Inter Milan	Genoa
	Briaschi I 81'		82' Oriali	Stadium: Stadio Luigi Ferraris; Referee: Barbaresco (Cormons)

21 March 1982 23	Inter Milan	1–1	Udinese	Milan
	Beccalossi 18' (pen.)		85' Cinello	Stadium: Giuseppe Meazza; Referee: Ballerini (La Spezia)

28 March 1982 24	Roma	3–2	Inter Milan	Rome
	Conti 36'; Bini 73' (o.g.); Ferri II 79' (o.g.)		64' Bagni; 84' Altobelli	Stadium: Stadio Olimpico; Referee: Menicucci (Florence)

4 April 1982 25	Como	1–1	Inter Milan	Como
	Nicoletti 70'		34' Bagni	Stadium: Stadio Giuseppe Sinigaglia; Referee: Patrussi (Ravenna)

18 April 1982 26	Inter Milan	1–1	Napoli	Milan
	Altobelli 6'		39' (pen.) Guidetti	Stadium: Giuseppe Meazza; Referee: Lo Bello (Siracusa)

25 April 1982 27	Juventus	1–0	Inter Milan	Turin
	Brady 76' (pen.)			Stadium: Stadio Comunale; Referee: Barbaresco (Cormons)

2 May 1982 28	Inter Milan	1–1	Fiorentina	Milan
	Ferroni II 21' (o.g.)		50' Miani	Stadium: Giuseppe Meazza; Referee: Agnolin (Bassano del Grappa)

9 May 1982 29	Bologna	3–1	Inter Milan	Bologna
	Fiorini 19', 25'; Mancini 75'		8' Centi	Stadium: Stadio Renato Dall'Ara; Referee: Menicucci (Florence)

16 May 1982 30	Inter Milan	2–1	Avellino	Milan
	Prohaska 60' (pen.); Altobelli 63'		90' Giovannelli	Stadium: Giuseppe Meazza; Referee: Bianciardi (Siena)

=== Coppa Italia ===
First Round

23 August 1981 1	Pescara	0–4	Inter Milan	Pescara
			6' Oriali; 47' Bagni; 70', 71' Altobelli	Stadium: Adriatico; Referee: Barbaresco

26 August 1981 2	Inter Milan	2–0	Hellas Verona	Milan
	Baresi I 6'; Altobelli 84'			Stadium: Giuseppe Meazza; Referee: Prati

30 August 1981 3	SPAL	1–1	Inter Milan	Ferrara
	Giani 16'		65' Bagni	Stadium: Stadio Comunale; Referee: Bergamo

6 September 1981 4	Inter Milan	2–2	AC Milan	Milan
	Altobelli 23'; Bergomi 89'		21' Novellino; 49' Jordan	Stadium: Giuseppe Meazza; Referee: Agnolin

Quarterfinals

8 December 1981	Roma	4–1	Inter Milan	Rome
	Chierico 12'; Faccini 14'; Bini 58' (o.g.); Di Bartolomei 88' (pen.)		82' Prohaska	Stadium: Olimpico; Referee: Lo Bello

23 December 1981	Inter Milan	3–0 (4a-4 agg.)	Roma	Milan
	Beccalossi 22'; Altobelli 48', 70'			Stadium: Giuseppe Meazza; Referee: Menicucci

Semifinals

10 March 1982	Inter Milan	2–1	Catanzaro	Milan
	Bergomi 53'; Altobelli 72'		39' Borghi	Stadium: Giuseppe Meazza; Referee: Longhi

10 April 1982	Catanzaro	3–2 (4–4a agg.)	Inter Milan	Catanzaro
	Bivi 2'; Borghi 65'; Cascione 104'		50' (pen.) Beccalossi; 97' Altobelli	Stadium: Comunale; Referee: Redini

==== Final ====
First leg

5 May 1982
20:45

Internazionale	1–0	Torino
Serena 40'

San Siro, Milan
Referee: Paolo Bergamo

Second leg

20 May 1982
20:30

Torino	1–1	Internazionale
Cuttone 13'		Altobelli 23'

Stadio Communale, Turin
Referee: Giancarlo Redini

=== UEFA Cup ===
First round

16 September 1981	(Turkey) Adanaspor	1–3	Inter Milan	Adana
	Özer 10'		61' Serena; 78' Bini; 89' Altobelli	Stadium: Adana 5 Ocak Stadium; Referee: (Czechoslovakia) Christov

30 September 1981	Inter Milan	4–1	(Turkey) Adanaspor	Cesena
	Beccalossi 18'; Bagni 51'; Serena 74'; Altobelli 75'		86' Ahmet	Stadium: Dino Manuzzi; Referee: (Bulgaria) Iosifov

Round of 32

21 October 1981	Inter Milan	1–1	(Romania) Dynamo Bucharest	Milan
	Pasinato 24'		38' Custov	Stadium: Giuseppe Meazza; Referee: (France) Konrath

4 November 1981	(Romania) Dynamo Bucharest	3–2 (a.e.t.) (4–3 agg.)	Inter Milan	Bucharest
	Georgescu 31'; Augustin 100'; Orac 108'		47' Altobelli; 95' Prohaska	Stadium: Stadionul Dinamo; Referee: (Belgium) Schoeters

== Statistics ==
=== Players statistics ===
No.	Pos	Nat	Player	Total		Serie A	
No.	Pos	Nat	Player	Apps	Goals	Apps	Goals
	GK	(Italy) ITA	Ivano Bordon	25	-25	25	-25
	DF	(Italy) ITA	Graziano Bini	25	0	24+1	0
	DF	(Italy) ITA	Giuseppe Bergomi	24	2	24	2
	DF	(Italy) ITA	Giuseppe Baresi	28	1	28	1
	DF	(Italy) ITA	Giancarlo Centi	24	1	20+4	1
	MF	(Italy) ITA	Giampiero Marini	20	0	20	0
	MF	(Italy) ITA	Evaristo Beccalossi	26	9	26	9
	MF	(Italy) ITA	Salvatore Bagni	27	5	27	5
	MF	(Italy) ITA	Gabriele Oriali	28	5	28	5
	FW	(Austria) AUT	Herbert Prohaska	28	3	27+1	3
	FW	(Italy) ITA	Alessandro Altobelli	29	9	28+1	9
	GK	(Italy) ITA	Renato Cipollini	5	-7	5	-7
	DF	(Italy) ITA	Klaus Bachlechner	20	0	16+4	0
	DF	(Italy) ITA	Giancarlo Pasinato	18	1	14+4	1
	DF	(Italy) ITA	Nazzareno Canuti	16	0	11+5	0
	MF	(Italy) ITA	Aldo Serena	21	2	7+14	2
	FW	(Italy) ITA	Claudio Fermanelli	0	0	0	0
	DF	(Italy) ITA	Riccardo Ferri	2	0	0+2	0
	DF	(Italy) ITA	Claudio Lombardo	1	0	0+1	0
	GK	(Italy) ITA	Angelo Pizzetti	2	-2	0+2	-2
	MF	(Italy) ITA	Luigi Rocca	1	0	0+1	0
	DF	(Italy) ITA	Fermo Spallanzani	0	0	0	0

- Source: http://calcio-seriea.net/presenze/1981/856/

== See also ==
- History of Inter Milan
- List of Inter Milan seasons

== Sources ==
- RSSSF Italy 1981/82
