= 1978 Coppa Italia final =

30th Coppa Italia final
- Event: 1977–78 Coppa Italia
Internazionale	Napoli
2	1
- Date: 8 June 1978
- Venue: Stadio Olimpico, Rome
- Referee: Gino Menicucci

The 1978 Coppa Italia final was the final of the 1977–78 Coppa Italia. The match was played on 8 June 1978 between Internazionale and Napoli. Internazionale won 2–1.

== Match ==
8 June 1978
20:30

Internazionale	2–1	Napoli
Altobelli 18'; Bini 89'		Restelli 6'

Stadio Olimpico, Rome
Referee: Gino Menicucci

Internazionale	Napoli

GK	1	(Italy) Renato Cipollini
DF	2	(Italy) Angiolino Gasparini
DF	3	(Italy) Adriano Fedele	(substituted off) 58'
DF	4	(Italy) Nazzareno Canuti
DF	5	(Italy) Giuseppe Baresi (c)
DF	6	(Italy) Graziano Bini
MF	7	(Italy) Alessandro Scanziani
MF	8	(Italy) Gabriele Oriali
MF	9	(Italy) Giampiero Marini
FW	10	(Italy) Carlo Muraro	(substituted off) 89'
FW	11	(Italy) Alessandro Altobelli
Substitutes:
AM		(Italy) Odoacre Chierico	(substituted in) 58'
FW		(Italy) Pietro Anastasi	(substituted in) 89'
Manager:
(Italy) Eugenio Bersellini

GK	1	(Italy) Massimo Mattolini
DF	2	(Italy) Giuseppe Bruscolotti
DF	3	(Italy) Moreno Ferrario
DF	4	(Italy) Antonio La Palma
DF	5	(Italy) Francesco Stanzione
DF	6	(Italy) Pellegrino Valente	(substituted off) 62'
MF	7	(Italy) Claudio Vinazzani
MF	8	(Italy) Maurizio Restelli
MF	9	(Italy) Antonio Juliano (c)
FW	10	(Italy) Giuseppe Savoldi
FW	11	(Italy) Luciano Chiarugi
Substitutes:
MF		(Italy) Enzo Mocellin	(substituted in) 62'
Manager:
(Italy) Gianni Di Marzio
