= 1983–84 Inter Milan season =

Inter Milan
1983–84 season
- Chairman: Ivanoe Fraizzoli; Ernesto Pellegrini
- Manager: Luigi Radice
- Serie A: 4th
- Coppa Italia: Group stage
- UEFA Cup: Round of 16
- Top goalscorer: League: Altobelli (10); All: Altobelli (15)
- Average home league attendance: 51,772
| Home colours | Away colours |
- All statistics correct as of 13 May 1984.

== Season ==
Coached by Luigi Radice, Inter had an awful start to the season failing in the Coppa Italia in the group stage, and losing three of four of the first league matches: fans used to describe it as a year of tears and blood. When the spring of 1984 was about to begin, Ernesto Pellegrini became the new chairman buying the club from Ivanoe Fraizzoli.

Inter resulted to have the best defence of the league, conceding only 23 goals in 30 games and achieving fourth place. This placement allowed the side take part in the 1984–85 UEFA Cup.

== Squad ==
=== Goalkeepers ===
- (Italy) Fabrizio Lorieri
- (Italy) Walter Zenga

=== Defenders ===
- (Italy) Giuseppe Baresi
- (Italy) Giuseppe Bergomi
- (Italy) Graziano Bini
- (Italy) Fulvio Collovati
- (Italy) Riccardo Ferri
- (Italy) Luca Meazza

=== Midfielders ===
- (Italy) Salvatore Bagni
- (Italy) Evaristo Beccalossi
- (Belgium) Ludo Coeck
- (Italy) Giampiero Marini
- (West Germany) Hansi Müller
- (Italy) Giancarlo Pasinato
- (Italy) Antonio Sabato

=== Forwards ===
- (Italy) Alessandro Altobelli
- (Italy) Carlo Muraro
- (Italy) Aldo Serena

Coach: Luigi Radice

=== Transfers ===
In
| Pos. | Name | from | Type |
|---|---|---|---|
| GK | Fabrizio Lorieri | AC Prato | - |
| GK | Angelo Recchi | Cesena | - |
| MF | Ludo Coeck | RSC Anderlecht | - |
| MF | Giancarlo Pasinato | AC Milan | loan ended |
| FW | Aldo Serena | AC Milan | loan ended |

Out
| Pos. | Name | To | Type |
|---|---|---|---|
| GK | Ivano Bordon | Sampdoria | |
| MF | Roberto Bergamaschi | Genoa CFC | co-ownership |
| MF | Gabriele Oriali | Fiorentina | |
| FW | Juary | Ascoli Calcio 1898 FC | co-ownership |

== Serie A ==
=== League table ===
| Pos | Team | Pld | W | D | L | GF | GA | GD | Pts | Qualification or relegation |
|---|---|---|---|---|---|---|---|---|---|---|
| 2 | Roma | 30 | 15 | 11 | 4 | 48 | 28 | +20 | 41 | Qualification to Cup Winners' Cup |
| 3 | Fiorentina | 30 | 12 | 12 | 6 | 48 | 31 | +17 | 36 | Qualification to UEFA Cup |
| 4 | Internazionale | 30 | 12 | 11 | 7 | 37 | 23 | +14 | 35 | Qualification to UEFA Cup |
| 5 | Torino | 30 | 11 | 11 | 8 | 37 | 30 | +7 | 33 | |
| 6 | Milan | 30 | 10 | 12 | 8 | 37 | 40 | −3 | 32 | |

Source: RSSSF.com
Rules for classification: 1) Points; 2) Head-to-head points; 3) Head-to-head goal difference; 4) Goal difference; 5) Goals scored; 6) Draw. (Note: Head-to-head record is used only after all the matches between the teams in question have been played).

==== Matches ====
| 11 September 1983 1 | Inter Milan | 1–2 | Sampdoria | Milan |
| | Bini 46' | Report | 63', 82' Francis | Stadium: Giuseppe Meazza |

| 18 September 1983 2 | Lazio | 3–0 | Inter Milan | Rome |
| | Giordano 22'; Cupini 61'; Laudrup 90' | Report | | Stadium: Olimpico |

| 25 September 1983 3 | Inter Milan | 0–0 | Torino | Milan |
| | | Report | | Stadium: Giuseppe Meazza |

| 2 October 1983 4 | Ascoli | 1–0 | Inter Milan | Ascoli |
| | Ferri R. 37' (o.g.) | Report | | Stadium: Stadio Cino e Lillo Del Duca |

| 9 October 1983 5 | Inter Milan | 1–0 | Napoli | Milan |
| | Altobelli 81' | Report | | Stadium: Giuseppe Meazza |

| 23 October 1983 6 | Udinese | 2–2 | Inter Milan | Udine |
| | Zico 5' (pen.); De Agostini 80' | Report | 48' Beccalossi; 75' Bagni | Stadium: Friuli |

| 30 October 1983 7 | Pisa | 0–0 | Inter Milan | Pisa |
| | | Report | | Stadium: Arena Garibaldi |

| 6 November 1983 8 | Inter Milan | 2–0 | AC Milan | Milan |
| | Serena 9'; Müller H. 36' | Report | | Stadium: Giuseppe Meazza |

| 20 November 1983 9 | Genoa | 1–1 | Inter Milan | Genoa |
| | Peters 20' | Report | 47' Serena A. | Stadium: Luigi Ferraris |

| 27 November 1983 10 | Inter Milan | 1–0 | Roma | Milan |
| | Beccalossi 7' | Report | | Stadium: Giuseppe Meazza |

| 4 December 1983 11 | Avellino | 1–1 | Inter Milan | Avellino |
| | Lucci 90' | Report | 15' Serena A. | Stadium: Stadio Partenio |

| 11 December 1983 12 | Inter Milan | 2–1 | Fiorentina | Milan |
| | Bagni 9'; Serena A. 18' | Report | 8' Passarella | Stadium: Stadio Giuseppe Meazza |

| 18 December 1983 13 | Juventus | 2–0 | Inter Milan | Turin |
| | Platini 44'; Vignola 83' | Report | | Stadium: Comunale |

| 31 December 1983 14 | Inter Milan | 1–0 | Hellas Verona | Milan |
| | Di Gennaro 12' (o.g.) | Report | | Stadium: Giuseppe Meazza |

| 8 January 1984 15 | Catania | 0–0 | Inter Milan | Catania |
| | | Report | | Stadium: Angelo Massimino |

| 15 January 1984 16 | Sampdoria | 0–2 | Inter Milan | Genoa |
| | | Report | 23' Serena A. 80' (o.g.) Pellegrini L. | Stadium: Luigi Ferraris |

| 22 January 1984 17 | Inter Milan | 1–1 | Lazio | Milan |
| | Manfredonia 10' (o.g.) | Report | 63' Manfredonia | Stadium: Giuseppe Meazza |

| 29 January 1984 18 | Torino | 3–1 | Inter Milan | Turin |
| | Hernandez 15' (pen.), 84' (pen.); Schachner 33' | Report | 13' Collovati | Stadium: Comunale |

| 12 February 1984 19 | Inter Milan | 0–0 | Ascoli | Milan |
| | | Report | | Stadium: Giuseppe Meazza |

| 19 February 1984 20 | Napoli | 0–2 | Inter Milan | Naples |
| | | Report | 17' Beccalossi; 55' (o.g.) Ferrario | Stadium: San Paolo |

| 26 February 1984 21 | Inter Milan | 2–0 | Udinese | Milan |
| | Altobelli 41'; Serena A. 49' | Report | | Stadium: Giuseppe Meazza |

| 11 March 1984 22 | Inter Milan | 3–0 | Pisa | Milan |
| | Sabato 39'; Altobelli 64'; Serena A. 87' | Report | | Stadium: Giuseppe Meazza |

| 18 March 1984 23 | AC Milan | 0–0 | Inter Milan | Milan |
| | | Report | | Stadium: Giuseppe Meazza |

| 25 March 1984 24 | Inter Milan | 1–1 | Genoa | Milan |
| | Altobelli 58' | Report | 76' Briaschi | Stadium: Giuseppe Meazza |

| 1 April 1984 25 | Roma | 1–0 | Inter Milan | Rome |
| | Di Bartolomei 25' (pen.) | Report | | Stadium: Olimpico |

| 15 April 1984 26 | Inter Milan | 3–0 | Avellino | Milan |
| | Müller H. 11'; Altobelli 35'; Sabato 62' | Report | | Stadium: Giuseppe Meazza |

| 21 April 1984 27 | Fiorentina | 1–1 | Inter Milan | Florence |
| | Passarella 78' (pen.) | Report | 31'Serena A. | Stadium: Artemio Franchi |

| 29 April 1984 28 | Inter Milan | 1–2 | Juventus | Milan |
| | Altobelli 45' (pen.) | Report | 24' Cabrini; 37' Platini | Stadium: Giuseppe Meazza |

| 6 May 1984 29 | Hellas Verona | 1–2 | Inter Milan | Verona |
| | Fanna 76' | Report | 72' Müller H. 74' Pasinato | Stadium: Stadio Marcantonio Bentegodi |

| 13 May 1984 30 | Inter Milan | 6–0 | Catania | Milan |
| | Müller H. 12', 13'; Altobelli 45'; Altobelli 59'pen Altobelli 71'; Altobelli 86' | Report | | Stadium: Giuseppe Meazza |

=== League results ===
| Overall | | | | | | | | Home | | | | | | Away | | | | | |
| Pld | W | D | L | GF | GA | GD | Pts | W | D | L | GF | GA | GD | W | D | L | GF | GA | GD |
|---|---|---|---|---|---|---|---|---|---|---|---|---|---|---|---|---|---|---|---|
| 30 | 12 | 11 | 7 | 33 | 23 | +10 | 47 | 9 | 4 | 2 | 25 | 7 | +18 | 3 | 7 | 5 | 8 | 16 | −8 |

Last updated: 13 May 1984.

2 points for every win were awarded, so Inter collected 35 points instead 47.

== Coppa Italia ==
=== Group 4 ===
| Pos | Team | Pld | W | D | L | GF | GA | GD | Pts |
|---|---|---|---|---|---|---|---|---|---|
| 1 | Cesena | 5 | 2 | 3 | 0 | 6 | 2 | +4 | 7 |
| 2 | Avellino | 5 | 2 | 2 | 1 | 6 | 5 | +1 | 6 |
| 3 | Internazionale | 5 | 2 | 1 | 2 | 7 | 6 | +1 | 5 |
| 4 | Sambenedettese | 5 | 1 | 3 | 1 | 3 | 2 | +1 | 5 |
| 5 | Parma | 5 | 1 | 3 | 1 | 6 | 6 | 0 | 5 |
| 6 | Empoli | 5 | 1 | 0 | 4 | 2 | 9 | −7 | 2 |

| 1 | Cesena | 1–0 | Inter Milan | Cesena |

| 3 | Inter Milan | 3–1 | Empoli | Milan |
| | | | | Stadium: Giuseppe Meazza |

| 5 | Sambenedettese | 2–0 | Inter Milan |

| 6 | Inter Milan | 3–1 | Avellino | Milan |
| | | | | Stadium: Giuseppe Meazza |

| 8 | Parma | 1–1 | Inter Milan | Parma |
| | | | | Stadium: Ennio Tardini Stadium |

=== UEFA Cup ===
First round

| 14 September 1983 | (Turkey) Trabzonspor | 1–0 | Inter Milan | Trebisonda |
| | Tuncay 88' | | | Stadium: Stadio Hüseyin Avni Aker; Referee: (Netherlands) Keizer |

| 28 September 1983 | Inter Milan | 2–0 | (Turkey) Trabzonspor | Cesena |
| | Altobelli 48' (pen.); Collovati 86' | | | Stadium: La Fiorita; Referee: (Germany) Scheurell |

Second round

| 19 October 1983 | (Netherlands) Groningen | 2–0 | Inter Milan | Groninga |
| | Koeman 16'; Fandi Ahmad 87' | | | Stadium: Euroborg; Referee: (Scotland) McGinlay |

| 2 November 1983 | Inter Milan | 5–1 | (Netherlands) Groningen | Bari |
| | Collovati 53'; Altobelli 55'; Serena 61', 89'; H.Müller 78' | | 63' McDonald | Stadium: Comunale Bari; Referee: (France) Delmer |

Eightfinals

| 23 November 1983 | Austria Wien | 2–1 | Inter Milan | Wien |
| | Nyilasi 78', 83' | | 53' Muraro | Stadium: Franz Horr Stadion; Referee: (Republic of Ireland) Carpenter |

| 7 December 1983 | Inter Milan | 1–1 | Austria Wien | Milan |
| | Bagni 79' | | 73' Magyar | Stadium: Giuseppe Meazza; Referee: (Belgium) Ponnet |

== Statistics ==
=== Players statistics ===
Appearances and goals are referred to domestic league.

| No. | Pos | Nat | Player | Total | | Serie A | |
| No. | Pos | Nat | Player | Apps | Goals | Apps | Goals |
|---|---|---|---|---|---|---|---|
| | GK | (Italy) ITA | Walter Zenga | 30 | -23 | 30 | −23 |
| | DF | (Italy) ITA | Giuseppe Bergomi | 25 | 0 | 25 | 0 |
| | DF | (Italy) ITA | Riccardo Ferri | 24 | 0 | 23+1 | 0 |
| | DF | (Italy) ITA | Giuseppe Baresi | 29 | 0 | 29 | 0 |
| | DF | (Italy) ITA | Fulvio Collovati | 27 | 1 | 27 | 1 |
| | MF | (West Germany) FRG | Hansi Müller | 26 | 5 | 23+3 | 5 |
| | MF | (Italy) ITA | Salvatore Bagni | 27 | 2 | 27 | 2 |
| | MF | (Italy) ITA | Evaristo Beccalossi | 22 | 3 | 19+3 | 3 |
| | MF | (Italy) ITA | Antonio Sabato | 29 | 2 | 29 | 2 |
| | FW | (Italy) ITA | Alessandro Altobelli | 28 | 10 | 28 | 10 |
| | FW | (Italy) ITA | Aldo Serena | 28 | 8 | 27+1 | 8 |
| | GK | (Italy) ITA | Recchi | 1 | 0 | 0+1 | 0 |
| | MF | (Italy) ITA | Giancarlo Pasinato | 23 | 1 | 11+12 | 1 |
| | DF | (Italy) ITA | Graziano Bini | 18 | 1 | 17+1 | 1 |
| | MF | (Italy) ITA | Gianpiero Marini | 17 | 0 | 9+8 | 0 |
| | MF | (Belgium) BEL | Ludo Coeck | 9 | 0 | 6+3 | 0 |
| | FW | (Italy) ITA | Carlo Muraro | 7 | 0 | 0+7 | 0 |
| | DF | (Italy) ITA | Walter Dondoni | 1 | 0 | 0+1 | 0 |
| | DF | (Italy) ITA | Luca Meazza | 1 | 0 | 0+1 | 0 |

- Source: http://calcio-seriea.net/presenze/1983/890/
