= Ambu =

Ambu may refer to:

- Ambu (company), a Danish manufacturer of medical products
  - Ambu bag, a proprietary name for a bag valve mask, a device to assist a patient's breathing
- Ambu (surname)
- Ambu, Azerbaijan, a village
- Ambu Island, off the coast of Mumbai
- AmbuPlay, famous youtuber from Brazil.

== See also ==
- Anbu (disambiguation)
