= Anbu =

Anbu may refer to:

- Anbu, Guangdong, a town in Guangdong, China
- Anbu, Iran, a town in Gilan Province, Iran
- Ambu (company), a Danish healthcare company
- Anbu (1953 film), a 1953 film starring Sivaji Ganesan
- Anbu (2003 film), a 2003 film starring Bala
- Anbu (king) (fl c. 25th century BCE), ruler of Sumeria in Dynasty of Mari
- Kalaivani Rajaratnam or Anbu, the Sri Lankan assassin of Indian prime minister Rajiv Gandhi

== See also ==
- Ambu (disambiguation)
