= Canuti =

Canuti is an Italian surname. Notable people with the surname include:

- Domenico Maria Canuti (1620–1660), Italian painter
- Federico Canuti (born 1985), Italian cyclist
- Nazzareno Canuti (1956–2026), Italian footballer
