= Evaristo Beccalossi =

Italian footballer (1956–2026)

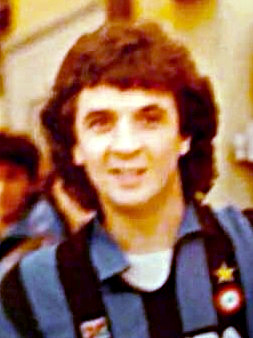

Personal information
- Date of birth: 12 May 1956
- Place of birth: Brescia, Italy
- Date of death: 6 May 2026 (aged 69)
- Place of death: Brescia, Italy
- Height: 1.76 m (5 ft 9 in)
- Position: Midfielder

Youth career
- 1972–1975: Brescia Calcio

Senior career*
Years	Team	Apps	(Gls)
1972–1978	Brescia	94	(14)
1978–1984	Inter Milan	216	(30)
1984–1985	Sampdoria	9	(0)
1985–1986	Monza	14	(3)
1986–1988	Brescia	48	(0)
1988–1989	Barletta	26	(6)
1989–1990	Pordenone	24	(4)
1990–1991	Breno		

International career
1976–1980	Italy U21	4	(0)
1979–1980	Italy Olympic	3	(1)
- * Club domestic league appearances and goals

Evaristo Beccalossi (12 May 1956 – 6 May 2026) was an Italian footballer who played as a midfielder. He played for several Italian clubs throughout his career, and was best known for his time at Inter Milan, where he won a Serie A title and a Coppa Italia.

== Club career ==
Originally from Brescia, Beccalossi started his football career with his hometown club in 1972, and later became a favorite of the Inter Milan fans, where he spent the majority of his career, from 1978–79 to 1983–84, frequently wearing the number 10 shirt. He donned the Inter jersey in 216 games, scored 37 goals and helped the team win a Serie A Championship (1979–80, scoring 7 goals) and a Coppa Italia (1981–82). Together with Inter centre-forward Alessandro Altobelli, Beccalossi formed one of the longest standing offensive partnerships of Serie A's recent history. They initially played together at Brescia and later became the team's leaders at Inter from the late 1970s to the mid-1980s, while they were supported defensively by Gianpiero Marini, Gabriele Oriali, and Giuseppe Baresi.

In the late summer of 1984, Beccalossi moved to Sampdoria for a season, around the same time Hansi Müller joined Inter Milan; he won another Coppa Italia title that year and helped the team to a fourth-place finish in Serie A. He later played for Monza for a season, before returning to Brescia for two more seasons; he subsequently spent single seasons with Barletta, and Pordenone, before finishing his career after a season with Breno in 1991. Following his retirement, he worked as a pundit.

== International career ==
Despite his talent, Beccalossi was never called up for the Italy national team at senior level throughout his career due to his inconsistency and poor work-rate, and was infamously excluded from the 1982 FIFA World Cup-winning side by manager Enzo Bearzot. He obtained seven caps for Italy at youth level, scoring 1 goal.

== Style of play ==
Nicknamed "Beck", "Becca", "Il Genio" (the genius), and "Driblossi" (by Italian sports journalist Gianni Brera, due to his dribbling ability and individualistic playing style), Beccalossi was a quick and talented attacking midfield playmaker, who was capable of both scoring and creating goals, and made a name for himself as an excellent assist provider throughout his career; he was also able to play in several midfield positions, and was also deployed as a deep-lying playmaker in midfield, or even in a more advanced role as a second striker. Although he was not known for his athleticism, strength, exceptional pace, or physical attributes, he possessed a fairly sturdy build and powerful legs, which aided him in short bursts of acceleration, and was highly regarded in particular for his creativity, eye for the final pass, dribbling skills, flair, and excellent technical ability, in a time in which defensive football dominated in Italy. Despite his ability, he also drew criticism in the media, however, for his inconsistency and poor work-rate; because of this, he often divided public opinion, and even his teammates often quipped that with Beccalossi on the pitch it was either like playing with a man down, or an additional player. He was also an accurate penalty taker; however, despite his record from the spot, he became known for missing two penalties in a single match with Inter; this incident occurred on 15 September 1982, in a 2–0 home win over Slovan Bratislava, in the first leg of the first round of the European Cup Winners' Cup. Although he was initially a naturally right-footed player, due to his admiration for the left-footed Italian-Argentine footballer Omar Sívori, Beccalossi became two-footed as a youngster while playing football at school and at the youth centre of his local oratory in San Polo, Brescia; because of this, he predominantly used his left foot throughout his career, although he was capable of using either foot indifferently, and could both score goals and pass with his right foot as well as his left. Throughout his career, his skill, left-footedness, and creative playing style drew comparisons with that of former Inter player Mario Corso, whom Beccalossi described as a point of reference.

== Death ==
Beccalossi died in Brescia on 6 May 2026, at the age of 69, from complications of a cerebral haemorrhage he had suffered in January 2025.

== Honours ==
Inter Milan

- Serie A: 1979–80
- Coppa Italia: 1981–82

Sampdoria

- Coppa Italia: 1984–85
