= Giancarlo Centi =

Italian footballer and coach

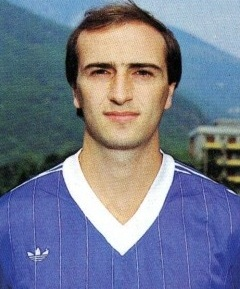
- Centi with Como 1984

Personal information
- Date of birth: May 14, 1959 (age 67)
- Place of birth: L'Aquila, Italy
- Height: 1.75 m (5 ft 9 in)
- Position: Midfielder

Senior career*
Years	Team	Apps	(Gls)
1975–1976	Sulmona	17	(0)
1976–1977	Internazionale	0	(0)
1977–1981	Como	112	(1)
1981–1982	Internazionale	24	(1)
1982–1983	Avellino	23	(0)
1983–1992	Como	222	(2)

Managerial career
- 1997–1998: Como
- * Club domestic league appearances and goals

Giancarlo Centi (born May 14, 1959, in L'Aquila) is an Italian professional football coach and a former player.

Centi played in Inter Milan's youth and senior sides, winning the 1981–82 Coppa Italia during his stay.
