= Osnağaküçə =

- Municipality
- Location within Azerbaijan
- Coordinates: 38°45′N 48°26′E
- Country: Azerbaijan
- Rayon: Lerik
- Time zone: UTC+4 (AZT)
  - Summer (DST): UTC+5 (AZT)

Osnağaküçə is a village in the municipality of Ambu in the Lerik Rayon of Azerbaijan.
