= Xəlfəkücə =

- Location within Azerbaijan
- Coordinates: 38°44′N 48°26′E
- Country: Azerbaijan
- Rayon: Lerik
- Municipality: Ambu
- Time zone: UTC+4 (AZT)
  - Summer (DST): UTC+5 (AZT)

Xəlfəkücə (also, Xəlifəkücə, Xəlfəküçə, and Khalfakyudzha) is a village in Lerik Rayon in Azerbaijan. The village forms part of the municipality of Ambu.
