= Ambu (surname) =

Ambu is an Italian surname. Notable people with the surname include:

- Antonio Ambu (born 1936), Italian long-distance runner
- Claudio Ambu (born 1958), Italian footballer
