= Marco Domenichini =

Italian footballer (born 1958)

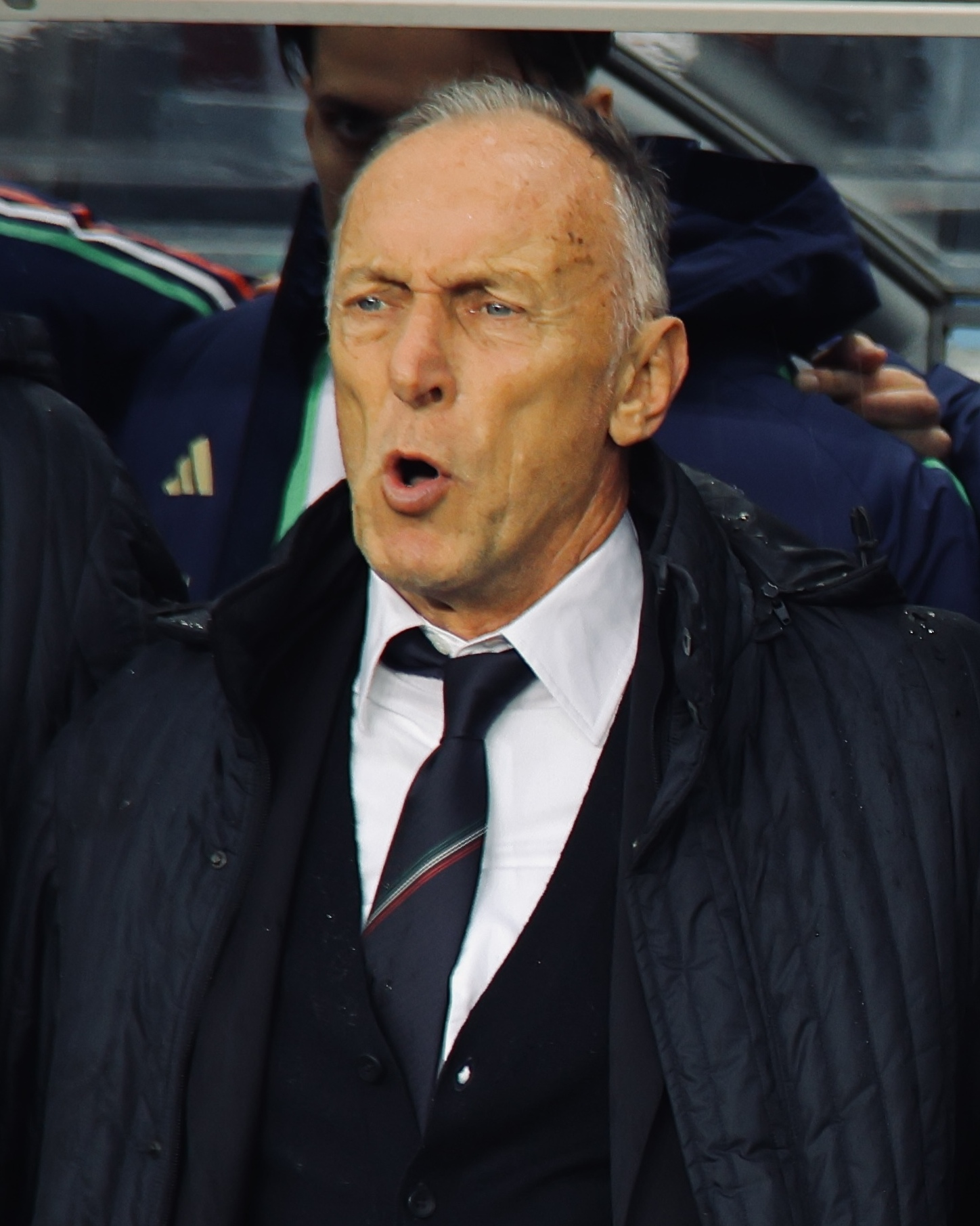
- Domenichini in 2025

Personal information
- Date of birth: 21 October 1958 (age 68)
- Place of birth: La Spezia, Italy
- Position: Midfielder

Team information
- Current team: Juventus (assistant coach)

Senior career*
Years	Team	Apps	(Gls)
1976–1979	Fiorentina	0	(0)
1979–1980	Pescara	4	(0)
1980–1982	Empoli	40	(2)
1982–1983	Paganese	31	(2)
1983–1984	Rondinella	30	(1)
1984–1986	Massese	61	(3)
- * Club domestic league appearances and goals

Marco Domenichini (born 21 October 1958) is an Italian football assistant manager and former footballer who is assistant manager of the Juventus.

== Early life ==
Domenichini was born in 1958 in La Spezia, Italy.

== Playing career ==
As a youth player, Domenichini joined the youth academy of Italian Serie A side Fiorentina, helping the youth team win the Torneo di Viareggio.

== Style of play ==
Domenichini mainly operated as a midfielder.

== Managerial career ==
Domenichini's career as a coach has seen him working as Luciano Spalletti's assistant throughout his career, starting in 1997 with Empoli. In 2009, Domenichini followed Spalletti at Russian side Zenit, helping the club win the league.

In 2023, following Spalletti's appointment as the new head coach of the Italy national team, Domenichini joined him as his assistant.

In 2025, following Spalletti's appointment as the new head coach of the Juventus, Domenichini joined him as his assistant.

== Personal life ==
Domenichini is the son of former USD Canaletto president Giorgio Domenichini.
