= Anbu, Iran =

Anbu انبو
- Village
- Location within Iran
- Coordinates: 38°01′00″N 48°50′00″E
- Country: Iran
- Province: Gilan
- County: Talesh
- Bakhsh: Kargan Rud
- Rural District: Khotbeh Sara

Population (2006)
  - Total: 385
- Time zone: UTC+3:30 (IRST)
  - Summer (DST): UTC+4:30 (IRDT)

Anbu (Persian: انبو, also Romanized as Anbū; also known as Anbūh-e Mashāyekh) is a village in Khotbeh Sara Rural District, Kargan Rud District, Talesh County, Gilan Province, Iran. At the 2006 census, its population was 385, in 106 families.
