= Ambu Island =

Island in India

Ambu Island (Mehti Khade) is an island off the coast of Mumbai near Madh Island located at 19.1333°N 72.7833°E in the Arabian Sea.

The isle is accessible during low tide across a rocky isthmus. A mosque is built on the island. There is also a makeshift church and a small Hindu Temple. The ruins of an old tower stand next to a small lighthouse. Malad, about 15 kilometres (9.3 mi) away, is the closest railhead to the island.
