= Amerigo Paradiso =

Italian footballer (born 1962)

Personal information
- Date of birth: 22 March 1962 (age 64)
- Place of birth: Milan, Italy
- Height: 1.77 m (5 ft 9 1/2 in)
- Position: Striker

Senior career*
Years	Team	Apps	(Gls)
1980–1981	Internazionale	1	(0)
1981–1982	Foggia	17	(3)
1982	Reggiana	4	(0)
1983	Ternana	7	(1)
1983–1984	Siena	21	(7)
1984–1985	Sanremese	28	(8)
1985–1988	SPAL	88	(26)
1988–1989	Sambenedettese	15	(0)
1989–1990	Virescit	25	(5)
1990–1992	Siracusa	63	(15)
1992–1993	Avellino	31	(5)
1993–1997	Fidenza	114	(51)
1997–1999	Sassuolo	39	(13)
- * Club domestic league appearances and goals

Amerigo Paradiso (born 22 March 1962) is an Italian former professional footballer.
