= Angelo Pizzetti =

Italian footballer (born 1963)

Personal information
- Date of birth: 10 October 1963 (age 63)
- Place of birth: Formigine, Italy
- Height: 1.83 m (6 ft 0 in)
- Position: Goalkeeper

Senior career*
Years	Team	Apps	(Gls)
1978–1979	Sassuolo		
1979–1980	Modena	0	(0)
1980–1981	Forlimpopoli	23	(0)
1981–1982	Internazionale	2	(0)
1982–1983	Modena	0	(0)
1983	Ternana	1	(0)
1983–1984	Savona	28	(0)
1984–1985	Modena	15	(0)
1985–1986	Ravenna	17	(0)
1986–1989	Forlimpopoli		
- * Club domestic league appearances and goals

Angelo Pizzetti (born 10 October 1963) is an Italian former professional footballer who played as a goalkeeper.
