= Roberto Mozzini =

Italian footballer

Personal information
- Date of birth: 22 October 1951 (age 75)
- Place of birth: Sustinente, Italy
- Height: 1.80 m (5 ft 11 in)
- Position: Defender

Senior career*
Years	Team	Apps	(Gls)
1970–1979	Torino	180	(5)
1979–1981	Internazionale	40	(1)
1981–1982	Bologna	18	(1)
1982–1983	Fano	20	(2)
1983–1985	Rondinella	65	(0)

International career
1976–1977	Italy	6	(0)
- * Club domestic league appearances and goals

Roberto Mozzini (Italian pronunciation: [roˈbɛrto motˈtsiːni]; born 22 October 1951) is a retired Italian professional footballer who played defender.

== Career ==
Born in Sustinente, Mozzini began his career with Torino. He made his Serie A debut against Internazionale on 7 November 1971.

== Honours ==
Inter

- Serie A champion: 1975–76, 1979–80.
