= Domenico Caso =

Italian footballer and coach (born 1954)

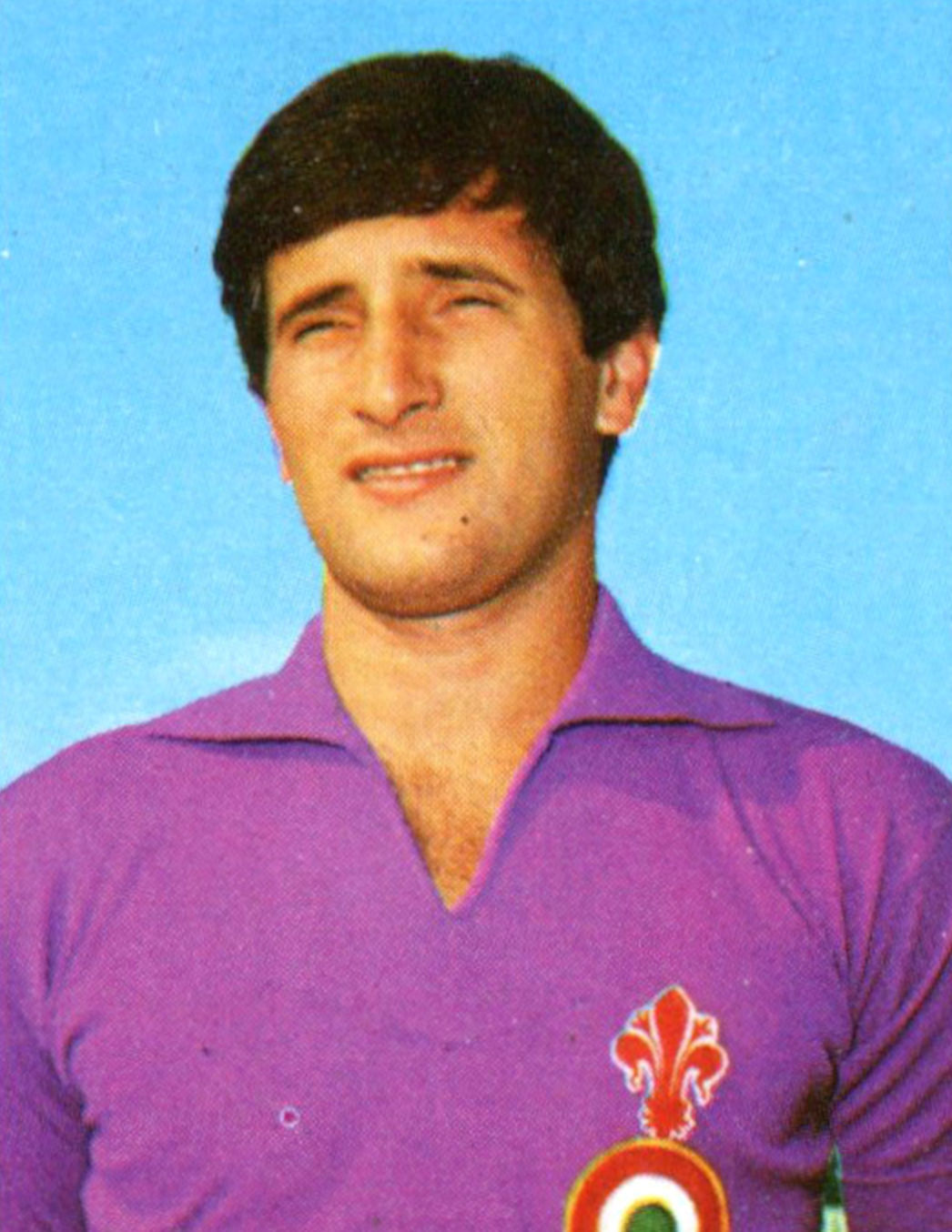
- Caso with Fiorentina in 1975

Personal information
- Date of birth: 9 May 1954 (age 72)
- Place of birth: Eboli, Italy
- Height: 1.71 m (5 ft 7 1/2 in)
- Position: Midfielder

Senior career*
Years	Team	Apps	(Gls)
1971–1978	Fiorentina	133	(23)
1978–1979	Napoli	15	(1)
1979–1981	Internazionale	57	(2)
1981–1983	Perugia	62	(8)
1983–1985	Torino	36	(1)
1985–1988	Lazio	94	(7)
1988–1989	Latina	25	(3)
1990	Orceana	13	(3)

International career
1974	Italy	1	(0)

Managerial career
- 1992–1997: Lazio (youth)
- 1997–1998: Foggia
- 1998–1999: Chievo
- 2000–2001: Pistoiese
- 2003–2004: Lazio (youth)
- 2004: Lazio
- 2005–2006: Ternana
- 2009–?: Cisco Roma (youth)
- * Club domestic league appearances and goals

Domenico "Mimmo" Caso (Italian pronunciation: [doˈmeːniko ˈkaːzo]; born 9 May 1954) is an Italian professional football coach and a former player, who played as a midfielder.

== Honours ==
=== Player ===
==== Club ====
Fiorentina

- Coppa Italia winner: 1974–75.

Internazionale

- Serie A champion: 1979–80.
