= Claudio Lombardo =

Italian footballer (born 1963)

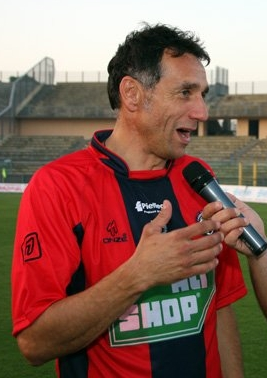
- Lombardo in 2008

Personal information
- Date of birth: 27 May 1963 (age 63)
- Place of birth: Voghera, Italy
- Height: 1.83 m (6 ft 0 in)
- Position: Defender

Senior career*
Years	Team	Apps	(Gls)
1979–1980	Derthona	26	(0)
1980–1981	Parma	15	(0)
1981	Rhodense	1	(0)
1981–1982	Internazionale	1	(0)
1982–1984	Vogherese	60	(3)
1984–1985	Asti	29	(1)
1985–1990	Cosenza	165	(3)
1990–1993	Salernitana	72	(3)
1993–1995	Gualdo	63	(0)
1995–1996	Perugia	30	(0)
1996–1997	Lucchese	30	(0)
1997–1999	Carrarese	60	(1)
1999–2000	Valenzana	28	(0)
2000–2001	Voghera	26	(0)
- * Club domestic league appearances and goals

Claudio Lombardo (born 27 May 1963 in Voghera) is an Italian former professional footballer.
