= Ambu, Azerbaijan =

Ambu
- Municipality
- Location within Azerbaijan
- Coordinates: 38°44′58″N 48°27′20″E
- Country: Azerbaijan
- Rayon: Lerik

Population
  - Total: 791
- Time zone: UTC+4 (AZT)
  - Summer (DST): UTC+5 (AZT)

Ambu is a village and municipality in the Lerik Rayon of Azerbaijan. It has a population of 791. The municipality consists of the villages of Ambu, Osnağaküçə, and Xəlfəkücə.
