= Renato Cipollini =

Italian footballer (1945–2019)

Personal information
- Date of birth: 27 August 1945
- Place of birth: Codogno, Italy
- Date of death: 12 March 2019 (aged 73)
- Place of death: Ferrara, Italy
- Height: 1.80 m (5 ft 11 in)
- Position: Goalkeeper

Senior career*
Years	Team	Apps	(Gls)
1964–1965	Fiorentina	0	(0)
1965–1966	Empoli	14	(0)
1966–1970	SPAL	85	(0)
1970–1971	Brescia	15	(0)
1971–1973	Como	69	(0)
1973–1977	Atalanta	120	(0)
1977–1982	Internazionale	7	(0)
- * Club domestic league appearances and goals

Renato Cipollini (27 August 1945 in Codogno, Province of Lodi – 12 March 2019 in Ferrara) was an Italian professional football player. Following his active career, Cipollini acted as president for Bologna during three years, in a time when the club was at its most successful for 25 years, especially when almost qualifying for the Champions League, only missing out with three points in 2001–02.

== Honours ==
Inter

- Serie A champion: 1979–80.
- Coppa Italia winner: 1977–78.
