= Franco Pancheri =

Italian footballer and coach

Personal information
- Date of birth: 25 January 1958 (age 68)
- Place of birth: Travagliato, Italy
- Height: 1.74 m (5 ft 8 1/2 in)
- Position: Defender

Senior career*
Years	Team	Apps	(Gls)
1976–1981	Internazionale	28	(0)
1977–1979	→ Como (loan)	41	(1)
1981–1984	Udinese	34	(0)
1984–1985	Cremonese	26	(0)
1985–1987	Cesena	74	(0)
1987–1989	Casertana	70	(0)
1990	Trento	9	(0)
1992–1993	Aversa Normanna		

Managerial career
- Internazionale (youth)
- 2003: FC Levadia
- * Club domestic league appearances and goals

Franco Pancheri (born 25 January 1958, in Travagliato) is an Italian professional football coach and former player.

== Honours ==
- Serie A champion: 1979–80
