= Nazzareno Canuti =

Italian footballer (1956–2026)

Personal information
- Date of birth: 15 January 1956
- Place of birth: Bozzolo, Italy
- Date of death: 24 January 2026 (aged 70)
- Height: 1.85 m (6 ft 1 in)
- Position: Defender

Senior career*
Years	Team	Apps	(Gls)
1974–1982	Inter Milan	130	(1)
1982–1983	→ A.C. Milan	35	(0)
1983–1985	Genoa	50	(0)
1985–1988	Catania	81	(2)
1988–1989	Solbiatese	31	(1)
- * Club domestic league appearances and goals

Nazzareno Canuti (15 January 1956 – 24 January 2026) was an Italian professional footballer who played as a defender. He died on 24 January 2026, at the age of 70.

== Honours ==
Inter Milan

- Serie A: 1979–80
- Coppa Italia: 1977–78, 1981–82
