= Alessandro Altobelli =

Italian footballer (born 1955)

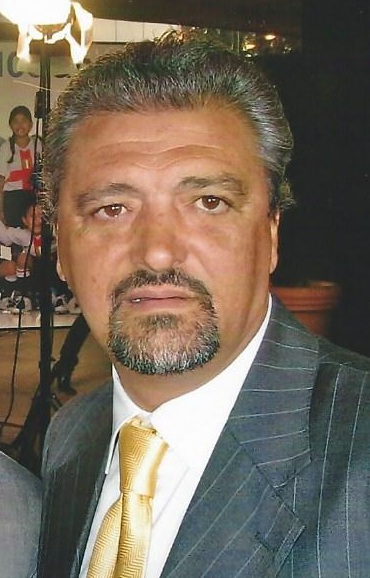

Personal information
- Date of birth: 28 November 1955 (age 70)
- Place of birth: Sonnino, Italy
- Height: 1.81 m (5 ft 11 in)
- Position: Forward

Senior career*
| Years | Team | Apps | (Gls) |
| 1973–1974 | Latina | 28 | (7) |
| 1974–1977 | Brescia | 76 | (26) |
| 1977–1988 | Inter Milan | 317 | (128) |
| 1988–1989 | Juventus | 20 | (4) |
| 1989–1990 | Brescia | 32 | (7) |
| Total | | 473 | (172) |

International career
| 1980–1988 | Italy | 61 | (25) |
Medal record
Men's football
Representing Italy
FIFA World Cup
| Winner | 1982 Spain |
Men's Beach Soccer
Beach Soccer World Championship
| Bronze medal – third place | 1996 Brazil |
- * Club domestic league appearances and goals

Alessandro Altobelli (Italian pronunciation: [alesˈsandro altoˈbɛlli]; born 28 November 1955) is a former professional Italian footballer who played as a forward, and who won the 1982 World Cup with Italy. Nicknamed Spillo ("Needle") for his slender build, Altobelli was a prolific goalscorer and regarded as one of the greatest and most effective Italian strikers of the late 1970s and 1980s. Altobelli is currently the all-time top scorer in the Coppa Italia, with 56 goals in 93 appearances, and the ninth-highest scoring Italian player in all competitions, with almost 300 career goals.

== Club career ==
Altobelli was born in Sonnino, Latina. Following spells at Latina (Serie C) and Brescia (Serie B), he was signed by Serie A club Inter Milan in 1977, for whom he played 466 times, scoring 209 goals (128 in Serie A). He contributed heavily to his team's scudetto victory of 1980 (scoring 15 goals), and also helped Inter to win two Coppa Italia titles in 1978 and 1982, finishing as the tournament's top scorer in the 1982 edition, with nine goals. Altobelli was also the top scorer in the 1978–79 European Cup Winners' Cup, with seven goals, leading Inter to the quarter-finals of the tournament. After his lengthy period with Inter, he played one season with Juventus during the 1988–89 season, before ending his career with Brescia in Serie B once again, during the 1989–90 season.

== International career ==
For Italy, Altobelli was capped 61 times between 1980 and 1988, scoring 25 goals, and he is currently Italy's sixth highest goalscorer. His most notable international goal was Italy's third goal in the 1982 FIFA World Cup final, which Italy won 3–1 over West Germany. After coming on in the seventh minute of play for the injured Francesco Graziani, he became the second ever substitute to score in a FIFA World Cup final (after Dick Nanninga in 1978 and with Rudi Völler and Mario Götze repeating this, in 1986 and in 2014, respectively). Altobelli also played at Euro 80, with Italy finishing in fourth place on home soil, as well as representing Italy at the 1986 FIFA World Cup, scoring four goals, which were, however, not enough to prevent the defending champions from crashing out of the tournament in the round of 16. He also represented Italy at Euro 88, where he played as the team's captain, leading the Italian squad to the semi-finals once again. He made four substitute appearances scoring just after coming on in a 2–0 win over Denmark in the group stages.

== Style of play ==
Altobelli played as a centre-forward and was regarded by several commentators as one of the leading strikers of his generation. A left-footed player, he was known for his aerial ability, including his heading accuracy, elevation, agility, and acrobatic finishing. He was also noted for his pace, work rate, technical ability, and finishing with either foot. Despite his relatively slender build, he combined balance and physical strength, enabling him to shield the ball, play with his back to goal, and bring teammates into attacking moves.

== After retirement ==
After retirement, he played for Italy national beach soccer team, being the top scorer at the 1995 and 1996 Beach Soccer World Championships.

In the 1990s, he entered politics. He also worked as a sporting director for Padova and as a football scout for Inter.

In the 2000s, he served as a pundit for Al Jazeera. Since September 2020, he serves as a pundit for RAI TV show A tutto campo. He also featured as a pundit in 90º minuto.

== Career statistics ==
=== Club ===
Appearances and goals by club, season and competition
| Club | Season | League | | | Coppa Italia | | Europe | | Total | |
| Club | Season | Division | Apps | Goals | Apps | Goals | Apps | Goals | Apps | Goals |
|---|---|---|---|---|---|---|---|---|---|---|
| Latina | 1973–74 | Serie C | 28 | 7 | – | | – | | 28 | 7 |
| Brescia | 1974–75 | Serie B | 16 | 2 | 1 | 0 | – | | 17 | 2 |
| Brescia | 1975–76 | Serie B | 26 | 11 | 4 | 0 | – | | 30 | 11 |
| Brescia | 1976–77 | Serie B | 34 | 13 | 3 | 3 | – | | 37 | 16 |
| Brescia | Total | | 76 | 26 | 8 | 3 | – | | 84 | 29 |
| Inter Milan | 1977–78 | Serie A | 28 | 10 | 10 | 4 | 2 (Note: Appearances in UEFA Cup) | 0 | 40 | 14 |
| Inter Milan | 1978–79 | Serie A | 29 | 11 | 2 | 1 | 6 (Note: Appearances in European Cup Winners' Cup) | 7 | 37 | 19 |
| Inter Milan | 1979–80 | Serie A | 29 | 15 | 5 | 4 | 4 | 3 | 38 | 22 |
| Inter Milan | 1980–81 | Serie A | 29 | 12 | 4 | 1 | 8 (Note: Appearances in European Cup) | 4 | 41 | 17 |
| Inter Milan | 1981–82 | Serie A | 29 | 9 | 9 | 9 | 4 | 3 | 42 | 21 |
| Inter Milan | 1982–83 | Serie A | 30 | 15 | 11 | 4 | 5 | 3 | 46 | 22 |
| Inter Milan | 1983–84 | Serie A | 28 | 10 | 5 | 3 | 6 | 2 | 39 | 15 |
| Inter Milan | 1984–85 | Serie A | 30 | 17 | 11 | 6 | 10 | 2 | 51 | 25 |
| Inter Milan | 1985–86 | Serie A | 29 | 9 | 6 | 4 | 10 | 6 | 45 | 19 |
| Inter Milan | 1986–87 | Serie A | 28 | 11 | 7 | 5 | 8 | 3 | 43 | 19 |
| Inter Milan | 1987–88 | Serie A | 28 | 9 | 10 | 5 | 6 | 2 | 44 | 16 |
| Inter Milan | Total | | 317 | 128 | 80 | 46 | 69 | 35 | 466 | 209 |
| Juventus | 1988–89 | Serie A | 20 | 4 | 6 | 7 | 8 | 4 | 35 | 15 |
| Brescia | 1989–90 | Serie B | 32 | 7 | 1 | 0 | – | | 33 | 7 |
| Career total | | | 473 | 172 | 95 | 56 | 77 | 39 | 645 | 275 |

=== International ===
Appearances and goals by national team and year
| National team | Year | Apps | Goals |
|---|---|---|---|
| Italy | 1980 | 6 | 2 |
| Italy | 1981 | 3 | 0 |
| Italy | 1982 | 7 | 2 |
| Italy | 1983 | 4 | 1 |
| Italy | 1984 | 9 | 3 |
| Italy | 1985 | 7 | 3 |
| Italy | 1986 | 10 | 9 |
| Italy | 1987 | 10 | 4 |
| Italy | 1988 | 5 | 1 |
| Total | | 61 | 25 |

Scores and results list Italy's goal tally first, score column indicates score after each Altobelli goal.

List of international goals scored by Alessandro Altobelli
| No. | Date | Venue | Opponent | Score | Result | Competition | Ref. |
|---|---|---|---|---|---|---|---|
| 1 | 22 June 1980 | Stadio Luigi Ferraris, Genoa, Italy | Portugal | 1–0 | 3–1 | Friendly | |
| 2 | 22 June 1980 | Stadio Luigi Ferraris, Genoa, Italy | Portugal | 2–1 | 3–1 | Friendly | |
| 3 | 11 July 1982 | Santiago Bernabéu Stadium, Madrid, Spain | West Germany | 3–0 | 3–1 | 1982 FIFA World Cup | |
| 4 | 13 November 1982 | San Siro, Milan, Italy | Czechoslovakia | 1–0 | 2–2 | UEFA Euro 1984 qualifying | |
| 5 | 22 December 1983 | Stadio Renato Curi, Perugia, Italy | Cyprus | 1–0 | 3–1 | UEFA Euro 1984 qualifying | |
| 6 | 3 March 1984 | BJK İnönü Stadium, Istanbul, Turkey | Turkey | 2–1 | 2–3 | Friendly | |
| 7 | 26 May 1984 | Varsity Stadium, Toronto, Canada | Canada | 1–0 | 2–0 | Friendly | |
| 8 | 9 December 1984 | Stadio Adriatico – Giovanni Cornacchia, Pescara, Italy | Poland | 1–0 | 2–0 | Friendly | |
| 9 | 5 February 1985 | Dalymount Park, Dublin, Republic of Ireland | Republic of Ireland | 2–0 | 2–0 | Friendly | |
| 10 | 6 June 1985 | Estadio Azteca, Mexico City, Mexico | England | 2–1 | 2–1 | Friendly | |
| 11 | 25 September 1985 | Stadio Via del Mare, Lecce, Italy | Norway | 1–0 | 1–2 | Friendly | |
| 12 | 26 March 1986 | Stadio Friuli, Udine, Italy | Austria | 1–1 | 2–1 | Friendly | |
| 13 | 11 May 1986 | Stadio San Paolo, Naples, Italy | China | 2–0 | 2–0 | Friendly | |
| 14 | 31 May 1986 | Estadio Azteca, Mexico City, Mexico | Bulgaria | 1–0 | 1–1 | 1986 FIFA World Cup | |
| 15 | 5 June 1986 | Estadio Cuauhtémoc, Puebla, Mexico | Argentina | 1–0 | 1–1 | 1986 FIFA World Cup | |
| 16 | 10 June 1986 | Estadio Cuauhtémoc, Puebla, Mexico | South Korea | 1–0 | 3–2 | 1986 FIFA World Cup | |
| 17 | 10 June 1986 | Estadio Cuauhtémoc, Puebla, Mexico | South Korea | 2–1 | 3–2 | 1986 FIFA World Cup | |
| 18 | 15 November 1986 | San Siro, Milan, Italy | Switzerland | 2–1 | 3–2 | UEFA Euro 1988 qualifying | |
| 19 | 15 November 1986 | San Siro, Milan, Italy | Switzerland | 3–1 | 3–2 | UEFA Euro 1988 qualifying | |
| 20 | 6 December 1986 | National Stadium, Ta' Qali, Malta | Malta | 2–0 | 2–0 | UEFA Euro 1988 qualifying | |
| 21 | 24 January 1987 | Stadio Comunale, Bergamo, Italy | Malta | 3–0 | 5–0 | UEFA Euro 1988 qualifying | |
| 22 | 24 January 1987 | Stadio Comunale, Bergamo, Italy | Malta | 4–0 | 5–0 | UEFA Euro 1988 qualifying | |
| 23 | 14 February 1987 | Estádio Nacional, Lisbon, Portugal | Portugal | 1–0 | 1–0 | UEFA Euro 1988 qualifying | |
| 24 | 23 September 1987 | Arena Garibaldi – Stadio Romeo Anconetani, Pisa, Italy | Yugoslavia | 1–0 | 1–0 | Friendly | |
| 25 | 17 June 1988 | Müngersdorfer Stadion, Cologne, Germany | Denmark | 1–0 | 2–0 | UEFA Euro 1988 | |

== Honours ==
Inter Milan

- Serie A: 1979–80
- Coppa Italia: 1977–78, 1981–82

Italy

- FIFA World Cup: 1982

Individual

- European Cup Winners' Cup top goalscorer: 1978–79
- Coppa Italia top goalscorer: 1981–82
- Beach Soccer World Championships top goalscorer: 1995, 1996
- Italian Football Hall of Fame: 2022

== See also ==
- List of FIFA World Cup top goalscorers

Sporting positions
| Preceded by Erwin Vandenbergh | FIFA World Cup opening goal 1986 | Succeeded by François Omam-Biyik |
