= Gianfranco Bellotto =

Italian footballer and manager (born 1949)

Personal information
- Date of birth: 2 July 1949 (age 77)
- Place of birth: Camposampiero, Italy
- Height: 1.73 m (5 ft 8 in)
- Position: Midfielder

Youth career
- Campetra
- Giorgione

Senior career*
Years	Team	Apps	(Gls)
1968–1970	Giorgione	57	(3)
1970–1972	Solbiatese	41	(6)
1972–1973	Reggina	31	(1)
1973–1974	Brescia	31	(2)
1974–1977	Modena	108	(10)
1977–1981	Ascoli	123	(16)
1981–1984	Sampdoria	72	(1)
1984–1986	Mestre	31	(1)
Total		494	(40)

Managerial career
- 1987–1989: Pisa (Assistant)
- 1989–1990: Mestre (Youth)
- 1990–1992: Giorgione
- 1992–1993: Pistoiese
- 1993–1994: Mantova
- 1994–1995: Fidelis Andria
- 1995–1997: Venezia
- 1997–2000: Treviso
- 2000–2001: Cagliari
- 2001–2002: Sampdoria
- 2002–2003: Venezia
- 2004: Modena
- 2004–2005: Vicenza
- 2006–2007: Salernitana
- 2007–2008: Novara
- 2012–2013: Ragusa
- 2019–2020: Treviso
- * Club domestic league appearances and goals

Gianfranco Bellotto (Camposampiero, 2 July 1949) is an Italian football manager and former football player, who played as a midfielder. He served as head coach several Italian football teams such as Modena, Sampdoria and Venezia. Among others, he achieved a Serie B Championship, a Capodanno Cup and a Red Leaf Cup.

== Career ==
=== Playing career ===
He was a midfielder: he played two years in Giorgione in Serie D, two years in Solbiatese in Serie C, a year in Reggina in Serie B, one year in Brescia always among the cadets and three years in Modena (one in Serie C and two in Serie B), four years in Ascoli (one in Serie B and three in Serie A), first with Giovan Battista Fabbri, with which finished fourth in the league, and then with Carlo Mazzone.

In 1981, he moved to Sampdoria where he played three seasons (one in Serie B and two in Serie A), before ending his career in Serie D.

He made his debut in Serie A on 1 October 1978 in Napoli-Ascoli (2-1). In top division as a player has collected a total of 126 appearances and 11 goals. Among the cadets 203 appearances and 17 goals.

=== Coaching career ===
As a coach, he started as assistant coach of Pisa, then he coached the youth of Mestre and in Serie D has been the head coach of Giorgione. In Serie C2 led the Pistoiese and in Serie C1 Mantova.

Subsequently, he found employment as head coach in Serie B with Fidelis Andria, then two years in Venezia and three in Treviso.

In Serie B he also led Cagliari, Sampdoria and Salernitana. His only experience in Serie A as manager was in the 2003–2004 season, when he took over Alberto Malesani at Modena.

In January 2007, replaced Raffaele Novelli to the guide of Salernitana [1] and in 2008 coached Novara, [2] formation of Serie C with which ended the season at the center of the table.

In August 2013, he has been hired by Ragusa, Sicilian team of Serie D, taking over Antonio Germano.

On 8 October 2019, 70-year old Bellotto returned to the coaching bench and was appointed manager of his former club, Treviso. In accordance with the club, he decided to step back in early January 2020.

== Honours ==
- Serie B (1)
- Capodanno Cup (1)
- The Red Leaf Cup (1)
- Serie D (2)
- Serie C2 (1)
