= Giancarlo Pasinato =

Italian footballer and coach

Personal information
- Date of birth: 20 September 1956 (age 70)
- Place of birth: Cittadella, Italy
- Height: 1.83 m (6 ft 0 in)
- Position: Midfielder

Senior career*
Years	Team	Apps	(Gls)
1973–1974	Cittadella		
1974–1977	Treviso	82	(8)
1977–1978	Ascoli	36	(5)
1978–1982	Internazionale	96	(6)
1982–1983	→ Milan	33	(7)
1983–1985	Internazionale	35	(2)
1985–1986	Ascoli	28	(3)
1986–1991	Cittadella	112	(4)

Managerial career
- 2001–?: Legnano (assistant)
- ?: Luparense
- * Club domestic league appearances and goals

Giancarlo Pasinato (born 20 September 1956 in Cittadella) is an Italian professional football coach and a former player, who played as a midfielder.

== Play style ==
Although he was initially often deployed in the centre of the pitch as a defensive midfielder, and even wore the number four shirt, which was associated with this particular midfield position at the time, Pasinato was also capable of playing in a free role out wide, essentially acting as a right winger, a position in which he eventually made a name for himself due to his speed and stamina, which enabled him to cover the flank effectively by making forward attacking runs from behind, and then dropping back to cover defensively. He was also a capable assist provider, courtesy of his crossing ability and good feet, which along with his pace and strength, enabled him to get past defenders frequently and deliver balls into the area, despite not being the most gifted dribbler. A tall and physically powerful player, he was given the nickname "Carro Armato" ("Tank," in Italian) throughout his career. He also stood out for his tactical intelligence and tenacity on the pitch.

== Honours ==
Ascoli

- Serie B: 1977–78, 1985–86

Inter

- Serie A: 1979–80
- Coppa Italia: 1981–82

Milan

- Serie B: 1982–83
