= Leonardo Occhipinti =

Italian footballer

Personal information
- Date of birth: August 11, 1960 (age 66)
- Place of birth: Milan, Italy
- Height: 1.75 m (5 ft 9 in)
- Position: Midfielder

Senior career*
Years	Team	Apps	(Gls)
1978–1980	Internazionale	2	(0)
1980–1981	Pisa	38	(0)
1981–1982	Como	10	(0)
1982–1984	Pisa	58	(0)
1984–1985	Fiorentina	23	(0)
1985–1986	Cagliari	35	(0)
1986–1989	Brescia	87	(6)
1989–1991	Piacenza	50	(0)
1991–1994	Solbiatese	59	(2)
- * Club domestic league appearances and goals

Leonardo Occhipinti (born August 11, 1960) is an Italian former footballer who made more than 350 appearances in the Italian professional leagues, including 111 in Serie A.

== Honours ==
- Serie A champion: 1979–80
