= Ivano Bordon =

Italian footballer

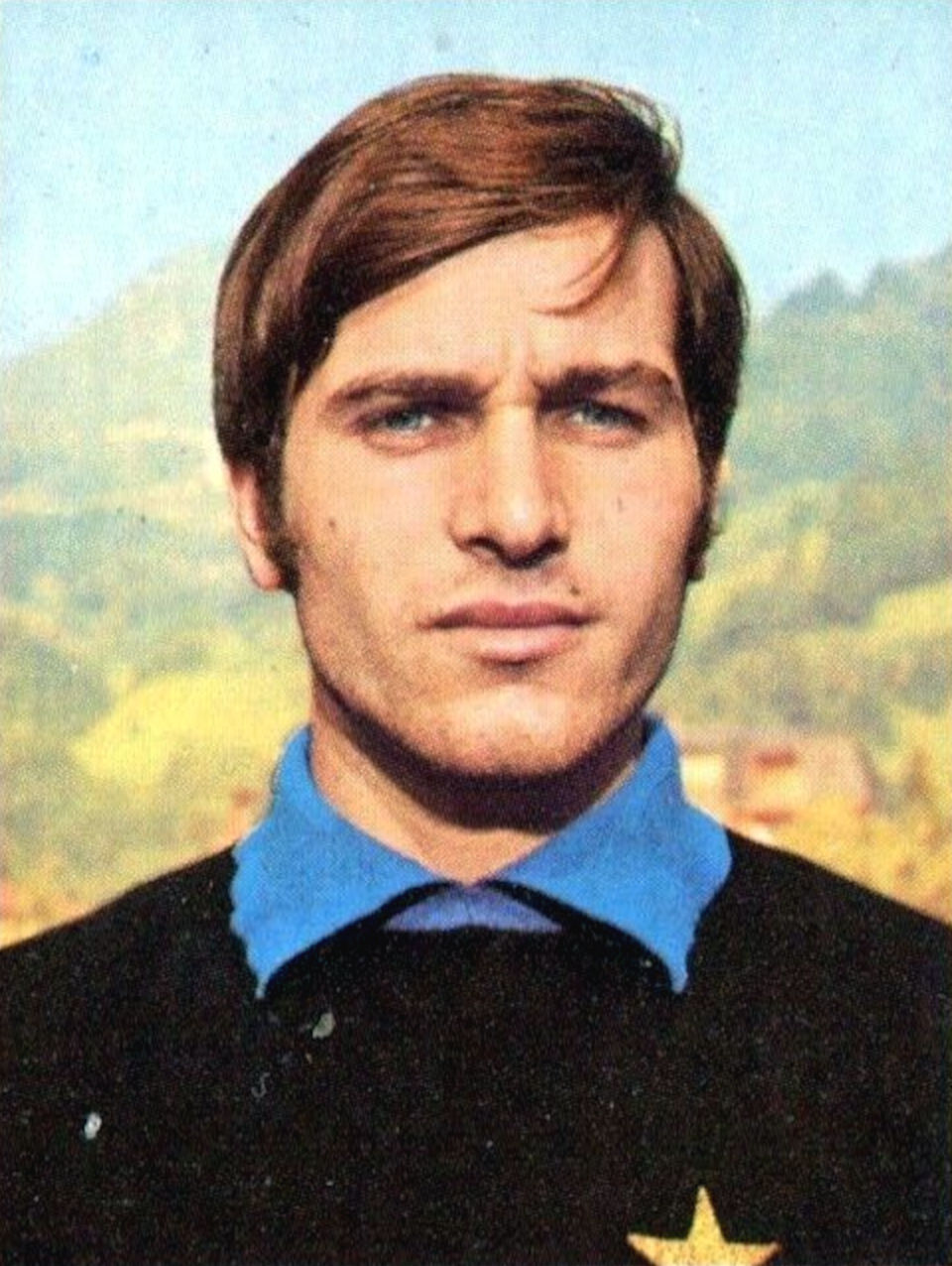
- Bordon with Inter Milan in 1973

Personal information
- Date of birth: 13 April 1951 (age 75)
- Place of birth: Marghera, Italy
- Height: 1.83 m (6 ft 0 in)
- Position: Goalkeeper

Senior career*
Years	Team	Apps	(Gls)
1970–1983	Inter Milan	281	(0)
1983–1986	Sampdoria	90	(0)
1987	Sanremese	16	(0)
1987–1989	Brescia	62	(0)
Total		449	(0)

International career
1970–1973	Italy U21	6	(0)
1978–1985	Italy	21	(0)

Managerial career
- 1989–1993: Solbiatese (goalkeeping coach)
- 1993–1994: Udinese (goalkeeping coach)
- 1994–1999: Juventus (goalkeeping coach)
- 1999–2001: Inter Milan (goalkeeping coach)
- 2001–2004: Juventus (goalkeeping coach)
- 2004–2006: Italy (goalkeeping coach)
Medal record
Representing Italy
FIFA World Cup
Winner	1982 Spain
- * Club domestic league appearances and goals

Ivano Bordon (Italian pronunciation: [iˈvaːno borˈdon]; born 13 April 1951) is an Italian former professional footballer who played as a goalkeeper. During his career he was regarded as one of the best goalkeepers in Italy, and had a successful career playing for several Italian clubs. At international level, he mainly served as a back-up to Dino Zoff, and was a member of the Italy national football team that won the 1982 FIFA World Cup, also taking part at the 1978 FIFA World Cup and UEFA Euro 1980.

After retiring, he became a notable and successful goalkeeping coach with Juventus and the Italy national team that won the 2006 FIFA World Cup, under manager Marcello Lippi.

== Club career ==
Bordon was born in Marghera, Venice. In 1966, he joined Inter Milan youth squad and debuted for the first team four years later. During his career, he mostly played for the Nerazzurri (1970–83) making 388 appearances. He initially served as a back-up to Lido Vieri, but later won a place as the team's starting goalkeeper, winning two Serie A titles in 1971 and 1980, as well as two Coppa Italia titles. He also reached the 1972 European Cup final with Inter, where they were defeated by Cruyff's Ajax side. In the 1979–80 season, he set the club's record for the longest run without conceding a single goal in Serie A (686 minutes).

He later played for Sampdoria (1983–86), where he won another Coppa Italia in 1985. He also played for Sanremese (1987) and Brescia (1987–89) before retiring.

== International career ==
At the international level, Bordon received 21 caps for the Italy national team between 1978 and 1984, and he participated in three major tournaments with Italy as Dino Zoff's backup. He represented Italy at the 1978 FIFA World Cup (where Italy reached the semi-finals finishing in fourth place), UEFA Euro 1980 (where Italy reached the semi-finals finishing in fourth place once again), and he was also a member of Italy's 1982 World Cup-winning squad.

== Managerial career ==
After hanging the boots, he began coaching goalkeepers. He did so at Solbiatese and Udinese, before starting, a long-term collaboration with manager Marcello Lippi.

In 1994, Bordon was tasked by Juventus manager Lippi with enhancing the performance of the goalkeeper Angelo Peruzzi. He stayed with Lippi at Juventus until 1999, during which the club won numerous trophies, including five Serie A titles and one UEFA Champions League. In 1999, Bordon followed Lippi at Inter, where he worked for two years even if Lippi was sacked at the beginning of the second season. Bordon then reunited with Lippi again, first in Juventus and then in the Italy national team that went ahead to win the 2006 FIFA World Cup.

== Style of play ==
He is regarded as one of the best Italian goalkeepers of his generation. Bordon was an introverted goalkeeper, known in particular for his cool-headedness, focus, positioning, and responsiveness. His agility in particular earned him the nickname Pallottolla ("Bullet").

== Honours ==
Inter

- Serie A: 1970–71, 1979–80
- Coppa Italia: 1977–78, 1981–82

Sampdoria

- Coppa Italia: 1984–85

Italy

- FIFA World Cup: 1982

Individual

- Inter Milan Hall of Fame: 2022
