= Carlo Muraro =

Italian footballer (born 1955)

Personal information
- Date of birth: 1 June 1955 (age 71)
- Place of birth: Gazzo, Italy
- Height: 1.76 m (5 ft 9 1/2 in)
- Position: Striker

Senior career*
Years	Team	Apps	(Gls)
1972–1981	Internazionale	126	(38)
1975–1976	→ Varese (loan)	35	(16)
1981–1982	Udinese	22	(2)
1982–1983	Ascoli	15	(0)
1983–1985	Internazionale	14	(1)
1985–1987	Arezzo	33	(9)
1987–1988	Pistoiese	6	(1)

Managerial career
- 1996–1997: Solbiatese
- 1998–1999: Saronno
- 1999–2000: Lecco
- 2001–2004: Pro Patria
- 2006–2007: Pro Sesto
- * Club domestic league appearances and goals

Carlo Muraro (born 1 June 1955) is a retired Italian professional footballer who played as a left winger.

== Style of play ==
A versatile forward, with an eye for goal, Muraro was capable of playing both as a centre-forward and as a left winger. His main characteristics were his exceptional pace, as well as his work-rate, dribbling skills, agility, and ability to time his runs, which made him a dangerous attacking threat on counter-attacks. He was also a powerful and accurate striker of the ball with either foot, and was known for his precise crossing, and ability in the air, courtesy of his elevation, timing, and heading accuracy. Beyond his skills as a player, he was also known for his intelligence both when attacking and defending, his ability to read the game, and his tendency to be decisive away from home. Due to his playing style and role on the pitch with Inter, he was given the nickname "The White Jair."

== Honours ==
Inter

- Serie A: 1979–80
- Coppa Italia: 1977–78
