= Gabriele Oriali =

Italian footballer

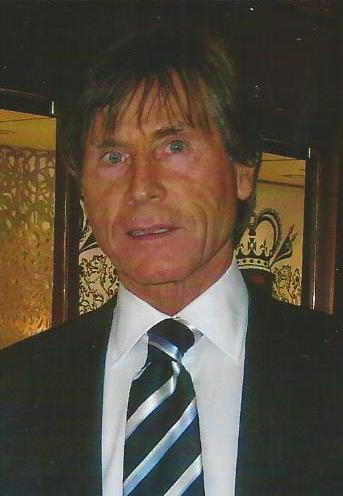
- Oriali in 2011

Personal information
- Date of birth: 25 November 1952 (age 73)
- Place of birth: Como, Italy
- Height: 1.76 m (5 ft 9 in)
- Positions: Defensive midfielder; right-back

Team information
- Current team: Italy (team manager)

Youth career
- 1966–1971: Inter Milan

Senior career*
Years	Team	Apps	(Gls)
1970–1983	Inter Milan	277	(33)
1983–1987	Fiorentina	105	(7)
Total		382	(40)

International career
1971–1974	Italy U21	4	(1)
1978–1983	Italy	28	(1)

Managerial career
- 1988–1994: Solbiatese (sporting director)
- 1994–1998: Bologna (sporting director)
- 1998–1999: Parma (technical director)
- 1999–2010: Inter Milan (technical director)
- 2014–2023: Italy (team manager)
- 2019–2021: Inter Milan (team manager)
- 2024–2026: Napoli (sports coordinator)
- 2026–: Italy (team manager)
Medal record
Men's football
Representing Italy
FIFA World Cup
Winner	1982 Spain
- * Club domestic league appearances and goals

Gabriele "Lele" Oriali Commendatore OMRI (Italian pronunciation: [ɡabriˈɛːle ˈlɛːle oˈrjaːli]; born 25 November 1952) is an Italian former professional footballer who primarily played as a defensive midfielder but also played as a right-back, who is currently team manager for Italy national team.

As a player, he was known in particular for his stamina, work-rate, ball-winning ability, and for his adeptness at breaking down opposition plays.

Oriali spent his club career initially with Inter Milan, and subsequently with Fiorentina. At international level, he represented Italy at the 1980 European Championship, and was also a member of the team that won the 1982 FIFA World Cup. Following his retirement, he worked as a sporting director and as a team manager.

== Club career ==
A native of Como, Lombardy, son of an Italian father and a Romanian mother, Oriali played for the Inter Milan youth team for four seasons before being promoted to the senior Inter squad; he would spend most of his career with Inter, making his professional debut for the club during the 1970–71 Scudetto winning season, and was an integral part of the Inter Milan squad of the 1970s and early 1980s.

With Inter, he won the scudetto again during the 1979–80 season (scoring 6 goals), and the Coppa Italia twice; his first Coppa victory was during the 1977–78 season, whilst his second came during the 1981–82 season. In all he played 70 matches and scored 8 goals for Inter in the Coppa Italia competition.

Oriali played 45 matches and scored 3 goals for Inter in European cup competitions. He was part of the team that lost to Ajax in the 1971–72 European Cup final.

Oriali is also remembered for a heroic performance in a Milan Derby, played on 25 October 1981. In that game he scored the winning goal but also required thirty stitches having been booted in the face by the AC Milan defender Mauro Tassotti. That year Inter won both of its derby games, a feat that would not be repeated until 2007, 26 years later.

After winning the 1982 FIFA World Cup with Italy, and following the end of the 1982–83 season, he moved to Fiorentina where he played for four seasons. He retired from football in 1987 after 382 games (40 goals) in Serie A.

== International career ==
Oriali was called up to the Italy national team for the first time on 21 December 1978, under manager Enzo Bearzot, in a friendly against Spain, quickly earning a starting spot. His one and only goal for Italy came in a friendly against Sweden, which was played in Florence on 26 September 1979; the game finished in a 1–0 Italian victory.

Oriali played for Italy in the 1980 European Championship, where Italy finished in fourth place on home soil, losing to Czechoslovakia in a penalty shootout in the third-place match, after reaching the semi-final.

In 1982, he was a key member of the Italy national team that in Spain won the 1982 World Cup. Oriali appeared in five games at the tournament, including the victorious final against West Germany, which Italy won 3–1, to win their third FIFA World Cup. He was also featured in Italy's second round matches against Argentina and Brazil, in the "group of death", and he also appeared as Italy defeated Poland in the semi-final.

Oriali's last game for Italy was on 29 May 1983 against Sweden, played in Gothenburg, as part of the qualifying for the 1984 European Championship. Italy lost the game 2–0. In total, he made 28 appearances for Italy between 1978 and 1983, scoring 1 goal.

== Managerial career ==
After finishing his playing career Oriali moved into the managing side of Italian football. First becoming a sporting director at Bologna, then at Parma. He returned to Inter Milan in 1999 to become its technical director. He held that position until 2010 when it was taken over by another former Inter player, Marco Branca (who held the position until January 2014). In 2001, as technical director, he was sanctioned for his part in the Álvaro Recoba fake passport incident. Oriali returned to the role as technical director at Inter in 2019, and was also appointed as team manager of the Italy national team concurrently.

== Style of play ==
Oriali did not have the best technical ability, but he was a tenacious and hard-working player, who was both tactically intelligent, and versatile; this allowed him to play anywhere in midfield, and also in defence, mainly as a full-back. Throughout his career, he distinguished himself for being a central or defensive midfielder with notable stamina, who excelled at reading the game and stopping opposing players; he was also an excellent man-marker. In addition to his work-rate, energy, and defensive abilities as a ball-winner, he was also known for his reliable distribution, and for having a tendency to receive and play many balls during matches. Due to his playing style, he was labeled an "incontrista" by the Italian press, a player whose sole responsibility was to break up plays and distribute the ball to another player to start an attack after winning back possession. He is considered one of the best Italian players of all time in his position. He was also highly regarded for his positional sense, as well as his ability to interpret the game and time his attacking runs, which allowed him to contribute to his team's offensive play with occasional goals.

In 2012, Oriali stated that the player who currently most resembled him in terms of his playing style was Daniele De Rossi, although, unlike De Rossi, Oriali was never sent-off throughout his career.

== Career statistics ==
Appearances and goals by national team and year
National team	Year	Apps	Goals
Italy	1978	1	0
Italy	1979	5	1
Italy	1980	8	0
Italy	1981	4	0
Italy	1982	8	0
Italy	1983	2	0
Total		28	1

Scores and results list Italy's goal tally first, score column indicates score after each Oriali goal.

List of international goals scored by Gabriele Oriali
No.	Date	Venue	Opponent	Score	Result	Competition
1	26 September 1979	Stadio Comunale, Florence, Italy	Sweden	1–0	1–0	Friendly

== Trivia ==
- His face appeared on a Chad stamp in 1983–one of a series of stamps commemorating the 1982 World Cup. He appears on a 60 franc stamp alongside Włodi Smolarek of Poland.
- Oriali is cited in the Luciano Ligabue song Una vita da mediano (A life as a half back), one of his most popular songs. Ligabue is a known Inter fan.

== Honours ==
=== Player ===
Inter Milan

- Serie A: 1970–71, 1979–80
- Coppa Italia: 1977–78, 1981–82
- European Cup runner-up: 1971–72

Italy

- FIFA World Cup: 1982

Individual

- Italian Football Hall of Fame: 2019
- Golden Foot: 2021, as Football Legend

Orders

- 3rd Class / Commander: Commendatore Ordine al Merito della Repubblica Italiana: 2021
