= Franco Selvaggi =

Italian footballer (born 1953)

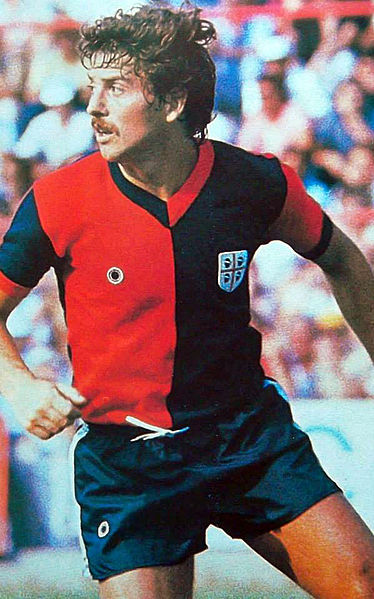

Personal information
- Date of birth: 15 May 1953 (age 73)
- Place of birth: Pomarico, Italy
- Height: 1.71 m (5 ft 7 in)
- Position: Striker

Youth career
- Pro Matera

Senior career*
Years	Team	Apps	(Gls)
1972–1973	Ternana	12	(1)
1973–1974	→ A.S. Roma (loan)	2	(0)
1974	Ternana	1	(0)
1974–1979	Taranto	146	(22)
1979–1982	Cagliari	85	(28)
1982–1984	Torino	56	(15)
1984–1985	Udinese	20	(5)
1985–1986	Inter	7	(0)
1986–1987	Sambenedettese	26	(9)
Total		355	(80)

International career
1980	Italy U21	2	(2)
1981	Italy	3	(0)

Managerial career
- 1992–1993: Catanzaro
- 1994: Taranto
- 1996: Matera
- 1998: Castel di Sangro
- 2002: Crotone
Medal record
Representing Italy
FIFA World Cup
Winner	1982 Spain
- * Club domestic league appearances and goals

Franco Selvaggi (Italian pronunciation: [ˈfraŋko selˈvaddʒi]; born 15 May 1953) is an Italian former football player. Born in Pomarico, province of Matera, he was deployed as a striker.

== Club career ==
In his Serie A career (1972–1986), Selvaggi played for Ternana (1972–74), A.S. Roma (1973–74), Cagliari (1979–82), Torino (1982–84), Udinese (1984–85), and Inter (1985–86), also playing with Taranto (1974–79), and ending his career with Sambenedettese (1986–87).

== International career ==
Selvaggi represented the Italy national under-21 football team twice in 1980, scoring 2 goals. With the Italy national team, he earned 3 caps in 1981, making his debut in a 0–0 home draw against East Germany on 19 April. He was a member of the Italy team that won the 1982 World Cup under Enzo Bearzot, but he never played a match in that event.

== Style of play ==
Selvaggi played centre-forward, despite being considered small for the position. He was known for making attacking runs off the ball, and his passing ability while playing off his team-mates during build-up plays. He was also capable of holding up the ball for his team with his back to goal.

== Retirement and managerial career ==
Following his retirement from playing football, Selvaggi became a football coach.

== Honours ==
=== International ===
Italy

- FIFA World Cup: 1982

=== Individual ===
- Medaglia d'Oro al valore atletico: 1982
