= Claudio Ambu =

Italian footballer (born 1958)

Personal information
- Date of birth: 2 August 1958 (age 68)
- Place of birth: Milan, Italy
- Height: 1.78 m (5 ft 10 in)
- Position: Striker

Senior career*
Years	Team	Apps	(Gls)
1977–1977	Inter Milan	1	(0)
1977–1979	Ascoli	50	(20)
1979–1981	Inter Milan	32	(4)
1981–1982	Perugia	30	(5)
1982–1983	Lazio	29	(3)
1982–1986	Monza	90	(17)
1986–1988	Genoa	38	(6)
1988–1990	Frosinone	56	(12)
1992–1994	Viareggio	20	(5)
- * Club domestic league appearances and goals

Claudio Ambu (born 2 August 1958) is an Italian former professional footballer who played for Inter Milan, Ascoli, Perugia, Lazio, Monza, Genoa, Frosinone and Viareggio.
