= Graziano Bini =

Italian footballer and manager

Personal information
- Date of birth: 7 January 1955 (age 71)
- Place of birth: San Daniele Po, Italy
- Height: 1.87 m (6 ft 2 in)
- Position: Defender

Youth career
- 1966: Cremonese
- 1968–1971: Inter

Senior career*
Years	Team	Apps	(Gls)
1971–1985	Internazionale	233	(7)
1985–1988	Genoa	28	(0)
Total		261	(7)

Managerial career
- 1996–1998: Inter Primavera
- * Club domestic league appearances and goals

Graziano Bini (born 7 January 1955) is an Italian retired professional football player and manager, who played as a defender. He spent the majority of his club career with Italian side Inter, where he won a Serie A title and two Coppa Italia titles; he ended his career with Genoa.

== Club career ==
Bini was born in San Daniele Po. After spending his youth career with Cremonese (1966) and Inter (1968–71), he also went on to represent the Inter senior team for fourteen seasons during his club career. He joined the first team during the 1971–72 season, making his debut on 7 May 1972, in a 0–0 away draw against Sampdoria; he remained with the club until 1985, later being named the team's captain in 1978, and wearing the armband for the next seven seasons, until he left the club. During his time in Milan, he made 343 appearances (233 in Serie A), scoring 13 goals (seven in Serie A); he won a Serie A title in 1980, and two Coppa Italia titles, in 1978, and 1982, also reaching the semi-finals of the 1980–81 European Cup, during which he scored a goal against Real Madrid. After struggling with injuries and competing with Riccardo Ferri for a place in the starting line-up during his final season with the club, Bini later joined Genoa, where he remained until his retirement in 1988, spending the last two seasons of his career in Serie B.

== International career ==
Due to much competition from Facchetti and subsequently Scirea in his position, at international level, Bini only made a single appearance for Italy, which came in a 4–1 unofficial friendly home win against Norway, on 10 February 1975; he also made five appearances with the Under-23 side, and two with the Italy national under-21 football team.

== After retirement ==
Following his retirement, Bini worked as a scout; he currently coaches the Free Players, a non-professional Italy national team made up of Serie A free agents.

== Style of play ==
A tall, physically strong and elegant sweeper, Bini was known for his confidence on the ball, his leadership, and his goalscoring as a defender, due to his ability in the air, although he was also injury prone. He was also capable of playing as a man-marking centre-back, or stopper.

== Honours ==
Inter

- Serie A: 1979–80.
- Coppa Italia: 1977–78, 1981–82.
