= Gianpiero Marini =

Italian footballer and manager

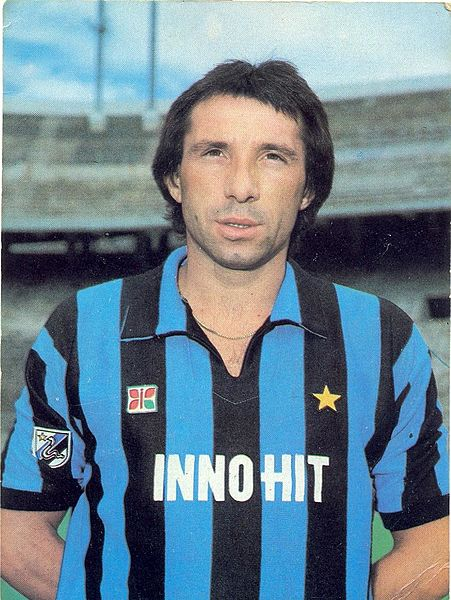
- Marini with Inter Milan

Personal information
- Date of birth: 25 February 1951 (age 75)
- Place of birth: Lodi, Italy
- Height: 1.76 m (5 ft 9 in)
- Position: Midfielder

Youth career
- Fanfulla

Senior career*
Years	Team	Apps	(Gls)
1968–1969	Fanfulla	19	(0)
1969–1970	Varese	0	(0)
1970–1972	Reggina	15	(0)
1971–1972	Triestina	25	(4)
1972–1975	Varese	89	(0)
1975–1986	Inter Milan	375	(13)
Total		523	(17)

International career
1980–1983	Italy	20	(0)

Managerial career
- 1994: Inter Milan
- 1997: Como
- 1997–1999: Cremonese
- 1999–2000: Como
- 2001: Italy B
Medal record
Men's football
Representing Italy
FIFA World Cup
Winner	1982 Spain
- * Club domestic league appearances and goals

Gianpiero Marini (Italian pronunciation: [dʒamˈpjɛːro maˈriːni]; born 25 February 1951) is an Italian former professional football manager and player, who played as a midfielder. A strong and hard-working defensive midfielder, Marini played for several Italian clubs throughout his career, in particular Inter Milan, where he won a Serie A title and two Coppa Italia titles during his 11 seasons with the club. At international level, he represented Italy on 20 occasions between 1980 and 1983, and was a member of the team that won the 1982 FIFA World Cup.

As a manager, Marini also coached Inter Milan, where he won the UEFA Cup in 1994, as well as Como, Cremonese, and the Italy B side.

== Club career ==
Marini was born in Lodi. Nicknamed Malik by fans, he played 256 matches in Serie A, scoring 10 goals. Throughout his career, he played for several teams, including Fanfulla, Varese, Reggina, Triestina and most notably Inter Milan. With Inter, he won a Serie A title ("Scudetto") during the 1979–80 season, and two Coppa Italia titles in 1978 and 1982.

== International career ==
With Italy, Marini obtained 20 caps between 1980 and 1983, and he represented Italy in their victorious 1982 FIFA World Cup campaign, which enabled him to become a World Champion. He made five appearances throughout the tournament.

== Style of play ==
Although Marini was not the most elegant or co-ordinated player with his feet from a technical standpoint or in terms of his movements and touch on the ball (leading famous Italian sportswriter Gianni Brera to nickname him "Pinna d'Oro," or golden fin in Italian, a reference to the perceived awkward shape of his feet but also the high quality of his performances), he was an efficient and tenacious player, who was known in particular for his strength, work-rate, tactical intelligence, vision, positioning, and ability to break down plays and subsequently start attacks as a holding midfielder or defensive-minded deep-lying playmaker. Moreover, he was known for his powerful and accurate striking ability from a distance. He was also nicknamed "Il Pirata" (the pirate) and Malik by his teammates, due to his combative playing style. Beyond his playing ability, he stood out throughout his career for his longevity, as well as his leadership and good sense of humour, which led him to make a name for himself as a key dressing room personality with his clubs.

== Managerial career ==
As coach, Marini also managed Inter Milan during the second half of the 1993–94 season, after replacing Osvaldo Bagnoli, where he won the UEFA Cup in 1994, despite narrowly avoiding relegation to Serie B in the league; Inter only won the relegation battle on the last match-day of the league season. He later also coached Como on two occasions (1997; 1999–2000), as well as Cremonese (1997–99), and the Italy B side in 2001.

== Outside of football ==
Following his coaching career, Marini pursued a career as a financial broker. He also enjoys playing the guitar and singing.

== Honours ==
=== Player ===
Inter

- Serie A: 1979–80
- Coppa Italia: 1977–78, 1981–82

Italy

- FIFA World Cup: 1982

=== Coach ===
Inter

- UEFA Cup: 1993–94

== See also ==
- List of UEFA Cup winning managers
