= 1977–78 Coppa Italia =

Tournament details
- Country: Italy
- Dates: 21 Aug 1977 – 8 June 1978
- Teams: 36

Final positions
- Champions: Internazionale (2nd title)
- Runners-up: Napoli

Tournament statistics
- Matches played: 96
- Goals scored: 247 (2.57 per match)
- Top goal scorer(s): Giuseppe Savoldi (12 goals)

The 1977–78 Coppa Italia was the 31st Coppa Italia, the major Italian domestic cup. The competition was won by Internazionale, who defeated Napoli in a one-legged final played at the Stadio Olimpico in Rome.

== First round ==
=== Group 1 ===
Pos	Team	Pld	W	D	L	GF	GA	GD	Pts
1	Juventus(A)	4	3	1	0	8	2	+6	7
2	Cesena(B)	4	2	1	1	6	3	+3	5
3	Brescia(B)	4	2	0	2	3	4	−1	4
4	Sambenedettese(B)	4	1	0	3	6	9	−3	2
5	Hellas Verona(A)	4	1	0	3	6	11	−5	2

=== Group 2 ===
Pos	Team	Pld	W	D	L	GF	GA	GD	Pts
1	Monza(B)	4	2	1	1	7	4	+3	5
2	Lazio(A)	4	2	0	2	7	5	+2	4
3	Varese(B)	4	1	2	1	3	3	0	4
4	Ternana(B)	4	2	0	2	4	8	−4	4
5	Bologna(A)	4	1	1	2	5	6	−1	3

=== Group 3 ===
Pos	Team	Pld	W	D	L	GF	GA	GD	Pts
1	Fiorentina(A)	4	4	0	0	9	3	+6	8
2	Roma(A)	4	3	0	1	7	5	+2	6
3	Sampdoria(B)	4	1	1	2	5	7	−2	3
4	Modena(B)	4	1	0	3	4	6	−2	2
5	Rimini(B)	4	0	1	3	3	7	−4	1

=== Group 4 ===
Pos	Team	Pld	W	D	L	GF	GA	GD	Pts
1	Torino(A)	4	3	1	0	7	3	+4	7
2	Genoa(A)	4	2	1	1	9	5	+4	5
3	Lecce(B)	4	1	2	1	3	3	0	4
4	Foggia(A)	4	1	1	2	8	11	−3	3
5	Bari(B)	4	0	1	3	2	7	−5	1

=== Group 5 ===
Pos	Team	Pld	W	D	L	GF	GA	GD	Pts
1	Internazionale(A)	4	3	1	0	7	1	+6	7
2	Ascoli(B)	4	2	2	0	4	2	+2	6
3	Atalanta(A)	4	1	1	2	4	6	−2	3
4	Cremonese(B)	4	1	1	2	2	4	−2	3
5	Como(B)	4	0	1	3	1	5	−4	1

=== Group 6 ===
Pos	Team	Pld	W	D	L	GF	GA	GD	Pts
1	Napoli(A)	4	4	0	0	11	3	+8	8
2	Palermo(B)	4	2	0	2	5	6	−1	4
3	Vicenza(A)	4	1	1	2	6	7	−1	3
4	Catanzaro(B)	4	1	1	2	4	5	−1	3
5	Avellino(B)	4	1	0	3	3	8	−5	2

=== Group 7 ===
Pos	Team	Pld	W	D	L	GF	GA	GD	Pts
1	Taranto(A)	4	2	2	0	7	2	+5	6
2	Pescara(B)	4	2	2	0	7	2	+5	6
3	Perugia(A)	4	2	2	0	4	1	+3	6
4	Cagliari(B)	4	1	0	3	5	11	−6	2
5	Pistoiese(B)	4	0	0	4	1	8	−7	0

Play-off match

Team 1	Agg.	Team 2	1st leg	2nd leg
Taranto	3-2	Pescara	2-2	1-0

== Second round ==
Join the defending champion: Milan.

=== Group A ===
Pos	Team	Pld	W	D	L	GF	GA	GD	Pts
1	Internazionale(A)	6	3	3	0	8	2	+6	9
2	Fiorentina(A)	6	2	3	1	8	5	+3	7
3	Torino(A)	6	1	3	2	4	5	−1	5
4	Monza(B)	6	1	1	4	5	13	−8	3

=== Group B ===
Pos	Team	Pld	W	D	L	GF	GA	GD	Pts
1	Napoli(A)	6	3	2	1	10	2	+8	8
2	Milan(A)	6	3	2	1	11	5	+6	8
3	Juventus(A)	6	2	1	3	7	14	−7	5
4	Taranto(B)	6	0	3	3	3	10	−7	3

== Final ==
8 June 1978
20:30

Internazionale	2–1	Napoli
Altobelli 18'; Bini 89'		Restelli 6'

Stadio Olimpico, Rome
Referee: Gino Menicucci

== Top goalscorers ==
Rank	Player	Club	Goals
1	(Italy) Giuseppe Savoldi	Napoli	12
2	(Italy) Giovanni Sartori	Milan	5
3	(Italy) Alessandro Altobelli	Internazionale	4
3	(Italy) Carlo Muraro	Internazionale	4
3	(Italy) Pietro Anastasi	Internazionale	4
3	(Italy) Oscar Damiani	Genoa	4
3	(Venezuela) (Italy) Bruno Nobili	Pescara	4
3	(Italy) Paolo Pulici	Torino	4
3	(Italy) Claudio Desolati	Fiorentina	4
3	(Italy) Enio Fiaschi	Hellas Verona	4
3	(Italy) Aldo Cantarutti	Monza	4
