= 1981–82 Coppa Italia =

Tournament details
- Country: Italy
- Dates: 23 Aug 1981 – 20 May 1982
- Teams: 36

Final positions
- Champions: Internazionale (3rd title)
- Runners-up: Torino

Tournament statistics
- Matches played: 84
- Goals scored: 162 (1.93 per match)
- Top goal scorer(s): Alessandro Altobelli (9 goals)

The 1981–82 Coppa Italia, the 35th Coppa Italia was an Italian Football Federation domestic cup competition won by Internazionale.

== Group stage ==
=== Group 1 ===
| Pos | Team | Pld | W | D | L | GF | GA | GD | Pts |
|---|---|---|---|---|---|---|---|---|---|
| 1 | Torino | 4 | 3 | 0 | 1 | 6 | 1 | +5 | 6 |
| 2 | Juventus | 4 | 2 | 1 | 1 | 7 | 4 | +3 | 5 |
| 3 | Perugia | 4 | 1 | 3 | 0 | 3 | 2 | +1 | 5 |
| 4 | Rimini | 4 | 1 | 1 | 2 | 3 | 5 | −2 | 3 |
| 5 | Cavese | 4 | 0 | 1 | 3 | 0 | 7 | −7 | 1 |

=== Group 2 ===
| Pos | Team | Pld | W | D | L | GF | GA | GD | Pts |
|---|---|---|---|---|---|---|---|---|---|
| 1 | Catanzaro | 4 | 2 | 2 | 0 | 7 | 1 | +6 | 6 |
| 2 | Palermo | 4 | 1 | 3 | 0 | 3 | 2 | +1 | 5 |
| 3 | Pistoiese | 4 | 1 | 2 | 1 | 3 | 3 | 0 | 4 |
| 4 | Cesena | 4 | 1 | 1 | 2 | 3 | 5 | −2 | 3 |
| 5 | Catania | 4 | 1 | 0 | 3 | 2 | 7 | −5 | 2 |

=== Group 3 ===
| Pos | Team | Pld | W | D | L | GF | GA | GD | Pts |
|---|---|---|---|---|---|---|---|---|---|
| 1 | Internazionale | 4 | 2 | 2 | 0 | 9 | 3 | +6 | 6 |
| 2 | Hellas Verona | 4 | 3 | 0 | 1 | 7 | 3 | +4 | 6 |
| 3 | Milan | 4 | 2 | 1 | 1 | 8 | 4 | +4 | 5 |
| 4 | SPAL | 4 | 0 | 2 | 2 | 2 | 5 | −3 | 2 |
| 5 | Pescara | 4 | 0 | 1 | 3 | 0 | 11 | −11 | 1 |

=== Group 4 ===
| Pos | Team | Pld | W | D | L | GF | GA | GD | Pts |
|---|---|---|---|---|---|---|---|---|---|
| 1 | Sampdoria | 4 | 2 | 1 | 1 | 5 | 2 | +3 | 5 |
| 2 | Cagliari | 4 | 1 | 3 | 0 | 3 | 2 | +1 | 5 |
| 3 | Lecce | 4 | 0 | 4 | 0 | 4 | 4 | 0 | 4 |
| 4 | Como | 4 | 0 | 3 | 1 | 3 | 4 | −1 | 3 |
| 5 | Sambenedettese | 4 | 0 | 3 | 1 | 2 | 5 | −3 | 3 |

=== Group 5 ===
| Pos | Team | Pld | W | D | L | GF | GA | GD | Pts |
|---|---|---|---|---|---|---|---|---|---|
| 1 | Napoli | 4 | 2 | 2 | 0 | 3 | 0 | +3 | 6 |
| 2 | Bari | 4 | 0 | 4 | 0 | 3 | 3 | 0 | 4 |
| 3 | Avellino | 4 | 0 | 4 | 0 | 1 | 1 | 0 | 4 |
| 4 | Ascoli | 4 | 1 | 2 | 1 | 5 | 6 | −1 | 4 |
| 5 | Cremonese | 4 | 0 | 2 | 2 | 0 | 2 | −2 | 2 |

=== Group 6 ===
| Pos | Team | Pld | W | D | L | GF | GA | GD | Pts |
|---|---|---|---|---|---|---|---|---|---|
| 1 | Fiorentina | 4 | 3 | 0 | 1 | 7 | 1 | +6 | 6 |
| 2 | Genoa | 4 | 2 | 2 | 0 | 2 | 0 | +2 | 6 |
| 3 | Varese | 4 | 2 | 1 | 1 | 5 | 5 | 0 | 5 |
| 4 | Brescia | 4 | 1 | 0 | 3 | 4 | 6 | −2 | 2 |
| 5 | Foggia | 4 | 0 | 1 | 3 | 2 | 8 | −6 | 1 |

=== Group 7 ===
| Pos | Team | Pld | W | D | L | GF | GA | GD | Pts |
|---|---|---|---|---|---|---|---|---|---|
| 1 | Reggiana | 4 | 2 | 2 | 0 | 6 | 2 | +4 | 6 |
| 2 | Udinese | 4 | 2 | 2 | 0 | 4 | 2 | +2 | 6 |
| 3 | Bologna | 4 | 1 | 2 | 1 | 4 | 4 | 0 | 4 |
| 4 | Pisa | 4 | 1 | 1 | 2 | 3 | 4 | −1 | 3 |
| 5 | Lazio | 4 | 0 | 1 | 3 | 2 | 7 | −5 | 1 |

== Quarter-finals ==
Join the defending champion: Roma.

| Team 1 | Agg. | Team 2 | 1st leg | 2nd leg |
|---|---|---|---|---|
| Catanzaro | (a) 2-2 | Napoli | 0-1 | 2-1 |
| Torino | (a) 1-1 | Fiorentina | 0-0 | 1-1 |
| Roma | 4-4 (a) | Internazionale | 4-1 | 0-3 |
| Reggiana | 1-1 (p: 3–5) | Sampdoria | 1-0 | 0-1 |

p=after penalty shoot-out

== Semi-finals ==
| Team 1 | Agg. | Team 2 | 1st leg | 2nd leg |
|---|---|---|---|---|
| Sampdoria | 2-2 (a) | Torino | 2-1 | 0-1 |
| Internazionale | 4-4 | Catanzaro | 2-1 | 2-3 (aet) |

== Final ==
=== First leg ===
5 May 1982
20:45

| Internazionale | 1–0 | Torino |
|---|---|---|
| Serena 40' |

San Siro, Milan
Referee: Paolo Bergamo

=== Second leg ===
20 May 1982
20:30

| Torino | 1–1 | Internazionale |
|---|---|---|
| Cuttone 13' | | Altobelli 23' |

Stadio Communale, Turin
Referee: Giancarlo Redini

Inter won 2–1 on aggregate.

== Top goalscorers ==
| Rank | Player | Club | Goals |
|---|---|---|---|
| 1 | (Italy) Alessandro Altobelli | Internazionale | 9 |
| 2 | (Italy) Edi Bivi | Catanzaro | 5 |
| 3 | (Italy) Carlo Borghi | Catanzaro | 4 |
| 4 | (Scotland) Joe Jordan | Milan | 3 |
| 4 | (Italy) Paolo Pulici | Torino | 3 |
| 4 | (Italy) Antonio Bordon | Cesena | 3 |
