= 1979–80 Serie A =

78th season of top-tier Italian football

Serie A
- Season: 1979–80
- Dates: 16 September 1979 – 11 May 1980
- Champions: Internazionale; 12th title
- Relegated: Pescara; Milan; Lazio
- European Cup: Internazionale
- Cup Winners' Cup: Roma
- UEFA Cup: Juventus; Torino
- Matches: 240
- Goals: 452 (1.88 per match)
- Top goalscorer: Roberto Bettega (16 goals)

Serie A 1979–80 team distribution

The 1979–80 Serie A season was the 78th edition of Serie A, the top-level football competition in Italy. The championship was won by Internazionale. Milan were relegated for the first time in their history following a match fixing scandal.

== Teams ==
Udinese, Cagliari and Pescara had been promoted from Serie B.

== Events ==
Following the creation of the UEFA ranking, Italy lost two out of its four places in the UEFA Cup inherited from the Fairs Cup.

== Final classification ==
Pos	Team	Pld	W	D	L	GF	GA	GD	Pts	Qualification or relegation
1	Inter (C)	30	14	13	3	44	25	+19	41	Qualification to European Cup
2	Juventus	30	16	6	8	42	25	+17	38	Qualification to UEFA Cup
3	Torino (Note: A.C. Milan and S.S. Lazio placed in the last position and relegated to Serie B by FIGC because of the Totonero 1980 scandal. Torino qualified to UEFA Cup instead of Milan.)	30	11	13	6	26	15	+11	35	Qualification to UEFA Cup
4	Ascoli	30	11	12	7	35	28	+7	34	
5	Fiorentina	30	11	11	8	33	27	+6	33	
6	Roma	30	10	12	8	34	35	−1	32	Qualification to Cup Winners' Cup
7	Bologna	30	8	14	8	23	24	−1	30	
8	Cagliari	30	8	14	8	27	29	−2	30	
9	Perugia	30	9	12	9	27	32	−5	30	
10	Napoli	30	7	14	9	20	20	0	28	
11	Avellino	30	7	13	10	24	32	−8	27	
12	Catanzaro	30	5	14	11	20	34	−14	24	
13	Udinese	30	3	15	12	24	38	−14	21	
14	Pescara (R)	30	4	8	18	18	44	−26	16	Relegation to Serie B
15	Milan (D, R)	30	14	8	8	34	19	+15	36	Relegation to Serie B
16	Lazio (D, R)	30	5	15	10	21	25	−4	25	Relegation to Serie B

Source: RSSSF.com
Rules for classification: 1) Points; 2) Head-to-head points; 3) Head-to-head goal difference; 4) Goal difference; 5) Goals scored; 6) Draw. (Note: Head-to-head record is used only after all the matches between the teams in question have been played).
Goal difference is used in case of equal points.
(C) Champions; (D) Disqualified; (R) Relegated

== Results ==
Home \ Away	ASC	AVE	BOL	CAG	CAT	FIO	INT	JUV	LAZ	MIL	NAP	PER	PES	ROM	TOR	UDI
Ascoli	—	0–0	2–0	1–0	2–2	1–0	1–1	2–3	1–1	0–0	0–0	1–0	3–1	3–0	1–0	3–0
Avellino	2–2	—	1–0	2–2	2–0	0–2	0–0	1–0	0–0	1–0	2–3	2–2	2–0	0–1	0–2	0–0
Bologna	0–0	1–0	—	0–1	4–1	2–1	1–2	1–1	1–0	0–1	0–0	1–1	0–0	1–1	1–2	2–1
Cagliari	1–1	1–1	1–0	—	1–0	2–1	1–1	2–1	1–1	0–0	1–0	1–2	1–0	1–3	0–0	3–1
Catanzaro	1–1	0–0	0–0	1–0	—	0–1	0–0	0–1	2–1	0–3	2–0	2–1	1–1	2–2	0–0	1–1
Fiorentina	3–1	3–0	0–0	1–1	3–0	—	0–2	2–1	0–0	1–1	0–0	0–0	2–0	3–1	1–0	1–1
Internazionale	2–4	3–0	0–0	3–3	3–1	0–0	—	4–0	2–1	2–0	1–0	3–2	2–0	2–2	1–1	2–1
Juventus	2–3	2–0	1–1	1–0	1–0	3–0	2–0	—	0–0	2–1	1–0	3–0	3–0	2–0	0–0	1–1
Lazio	0–1	1–1	0–1	1–1	2–0	2–0	0–0	1–0	—	0–2	1–1	1–1	2–0	1–2	2–1	0–0
Milan	3–0	1–0	4–0	2–0	0–0	2–0	0–1	2–1	2–1	—	1–2	1–0	3–1	0–0	0–2	0–0
Napoli	1–0	0–1	1–1	0–0	1–1	0–0	3–4	0–0	0–0	0–1	—	1–1	2–0	3–0	1–0	1–0
Perugia	0–0	2–1	1–1	1–0	0–0	1–2	0–0	1–0	0–0	1–1	1–0	—	1–0	3–1	0–2	2–0
Pescara	0–0	1–1	0–0	2–0	1–1	1–2	0–2	0–2	2–0	2–1	1–0	1–1	—	2–3	0–2	1–1
Roma	1–0	1–1	1–2	1–1	1–0	2–1	1–0	1–3	1–1	0–0	0–0	4–0	2–0	—	1–1	1–1
Torino	1–0	2–2	0–0	0–0	0–0	1–1	0–0	1–2	1–0	0–1	0–0	2–0	2–0	1–0	—	1–1
Udinese	3–1	0–1	0–2	1–1	1–2	2–2	1–1	1–3	1–1	2–1	0–0	1–2	2–1	0–0	0–1	—

Legend: Blue = home team win; Yellow = draw; Red = away team win.

== Top goalscorers ==
Rank	Player	Club	Goals
1	(Italy) Roberto Bettega	Juventus	18
2	(Italy) Alessandro Altobelli	Internazionale	15
3	(Italy) Paolo Rossi	Perugia	13
4	(Italy) Francesco Graziani	Torino	12
4	(Italy) Franco Selvaggi	Cagliari	12
4	(Italy) Roberto Pruzzo	Roma	12
7	(Italy) Giuseppe Savoldi	Bologna	11
8	(Italy) Massimo Palanca	Catanzaro	9
8	(Italy) Bruno Giordano	Lazio	9
10	(Italy) Gianfranco Bellotto	Ascoli	8
10	(Italy) Giancarlo Antognoni	Fiorentina	8

== Attendances ==
#	Club	Average
1	Napoli	55,535
2	Internazionale	49,656
3	Roma	44,589
4	Milan	40,660
5	Fiorentina	39,154
6	Lazio	31,560
7	Juventus	31,144
8	Cagliari	31,057
9	Torino	27,607
10	Bologna	27,039
11	Avellino	23,880
12	Udinese	21,757
13	Pescara	20,466
14	Perugia	20,338
15	Ascoli	19,141
16	Catanzaro	12,137
