= 1929–30 AS Ambrosiana season =

Associazione Sportiva Ambrosiana
1929–30 season
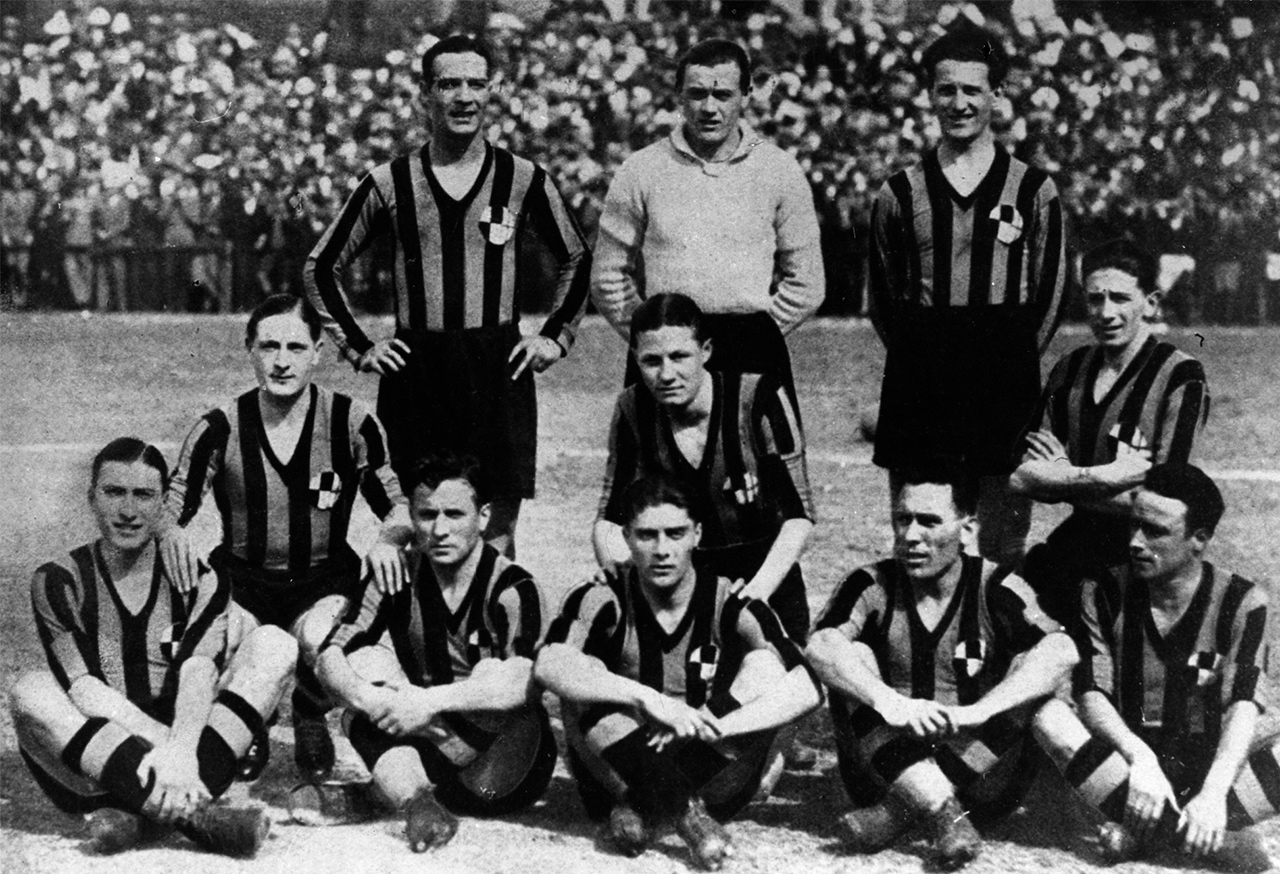
- President: Oreste Simonotti
- Manager: Árpád Weisz
- Stadium: Campo Virgilio Fossati
- Serie A: 1st (in Mitropa Cup)
- Mitropa Cup: Semifinals
- Top goalscorer: League: Giuseppe Meazza (31); All: Meazza (31)
Home colours

During the 1929–30 season Associazione Sportiva Ambrosiana competed in Serie A and Mitropa Cup.

== Summary ==
New club chairman Oreste Simonotti changed the club's name to Associazione Sportiva Ambrosiana and restored the previous black-and-blue jerseys. The new colors were a legacy from Unione Sportiva Milanese, before the merger. Hungarian manager Árpád Weisz returned to the bench, and Oreste Simonotti arrived from Casale as new chairman due to deficit left by former chairman Ernesto Torrusio.

In a 1929–30 Serie A campaign changing competition format to a sole group, Ambrosiana debut match was a triumph against Livorno. By 16 February 1930, the squad counts 23 points (with a match pending against Juventus). Played the game on 20 April, Ambrosiana took an advantage of + 4 points over Juventus and Genoa. The success was determined in direct matches between teams programmed for last round on Sunday. On 8 June in Genoa, Juventus is defeated 2-0 falling to − 6 points. Meanwhile, Ambrosiana draw 3–3 at home against Liguria (included a penalty missed in last minutes) standing with 4 points of advantage. The scudetto is clinched on 29, with a victory in stadio San Siro against Torino taking Ambrosiana to a 50 points and leadership. Crucial to the trophy was Giuseppe Meazza, league topscorer: 31 goals.

The squad competed in 1930 Mitropa Cup defeated in semifinals by Sparta Praha.

== Squad ==
Note: Flags indicate national team as defined under FIFA eligibility rules; some limited exceptions apply. Players may hold more than one non-FIFA nationality.

Pos.	Nation	Player
GK	ITA	Valentino Degani
GK	ITA	Bonifacio Smerzi
DF	ITA	Luigi Allemandi
DF	ITA	Giovanni Bolzoni
DF	ITA	Vincenzo Coppo
DF	ITA	Stefano Gallio
DF	ITA	Giovanni Gasparini
DF	ITA	Guido Gianfardoni
DF	ITA	Silvio Pietroboni
MF	Kingdom of Yugoslavia	Antonio Blasevich
MF	ITA	Armando Castellazzi

Pos.	Nation	Player
MF	ITA	Luigi Ciminaghi
MF	ITA	Enrico Rivolta
MF	ITA	Luigi Rizzi
MF	ITA	Pietro Serantoni
MF	ITA	Giuseppe Viani
FW	ITA	Giulio Balestrini
FW	ITA	Leopoldo Conti (Captain)
FW	ITA	Giuseppe Meazza
FW	ITA	Luigi Pedrazzini
FW	ITA	Pietro Povero
FW	ITA	Umberto Visentin

== Competitions ==
=== Serie A ===
==== League table ====
Pos	Team	Pld	W	D	L	GF	GA	GD	Pts	Qualification or relegation
1	Ambrosiana (C)	34	22	6	6	85	38	+47	50	1930 Mitropa Cup
2	Genoa	34	20	8	6	63	36	+27	48	1930 Mitropa Cup
3	Juventus	34	19	7	8	56	31	+25	45	
4	Torino	34	16	7	11	52	31	+21	39	
5	Napoli	34	14	9	11	61	51	+10	37	

Source: lega-calcio.it (in Italian)
Rules for classification: 1) points; 2) goal average
(C) Champions

==== Position by round ====
Round	1	2	3	4	5	6	7	8	9	10	11	12	13	14	15	16	17	18	19	20	21	22	23	24	25	26	27	28	29	30	31	32	33	34	35
Ground	A	A	H	A	H	A	H	A	H	A	A	H	A	H	A	A	H	H	H	A	A	H	A	H	A	H	A	H	H	A	H	A	H	H	A
Result	W	L	W	D	W	W	W	L	L	W	D	W	D	W	W	-	W	W	W	D	W	W	D	W	W	W	W	W	W	L	W	L	D	W	L
Position	1	8	4	7	2	1	1	3	4	3	3	3	5	3	3	3	2	1	1	2	1	1	1	1	1	1	1	1	1	1	1	1	1	1	1

Source: http://calcio-seriea.net/allenatori_squadra/1929/8/
A = Away; H = Home; W = Win; D = Draw; L = Loss; = Leader, Mitropa Cup; = Invited to 1930 Mitropa Cup; = Relegation to 1930–31 Serie B

==== Matches ====
6 October 1929 1	Livorno	1–2	Ambrosiana	Livorno
	Palandri 60'	Report	6' Meazza; 31' Rivolta	Stadium: Villa Chayes; Referee: Giuseppe Turbiani

13 October 1929 2	Pro Vercelli	1–0	Ambrosiana	Vercelli
	Casalino 23'	Report		Stadium: Foro Boario; Referee: Cesare Lenti

20 October 1929 3	Ambrosiana	2–1	Bologna	Milan
	Serantoni 43'; Balestrini 56'	Report	41' Pilati IV	Stadium: Campo Virgilio Fossati; Referee: Rinaldo Barlassina

27 October 1929 4	Lazio	1–1	Ambrosiana	Rome
	Sbrana 33'	Report	63' Balestrini	Stadium: Stadio della Rondinella; Referee: Costante Pessato

3 November 1929 5	Ambrosiana	3–2	Cremonese	Milan
	Meazza 5', 47'; Blasevich 30'	Report	69', 75' Camisaschi	Stadium: Campo Virgilio Fossati; Referee: Domenico Enrietti

10 November 1929 6	Milan	1–2	Ambrosiana	Milan
	Tansini 9'	Report	6' Visentin III; 60' Meazza	Stadium: Campo Milan; Referee: Albino Carraro

17 November 1929 7	Ambrosiana	6–1	Padova	Milan
	Meazza 8', 10', 31'; Visentin III 11'; Povero 16'; Conti 54'	Report	55' Perazzolo	Stadium: Campo Virgilio Fossati; Referee: Mattea

24 November 1929 8	Roma	2–0	Ambrosiana	Rome
	Benatti 27'; Chini Ludueña 84'	Report		Stadium: Campo Testaccio; Referee: Giovanni Bruna

8 December 1929 9	Ambrosiana	1–2	Triestina	Milan
	Meazza 13'	Report	11' (o.g.) Gasparini; 65' Pasinati	Stadium: Arena Civica; Referee: Girelli

15 December 1929 10	Alessandria	1–2	Ambrosiana	Alessandria
	Ferrari 25'	Report	20' Serantoni; 54' Conti	Stadium: Campo del Littorio; Referee: Rinaldo Barlassina

22 December 1929 11	Pro Patria	0–0	Ambrosiana	Busto Arsizio
		Report		Stadium: Stadio Carlo Speroni; Referee: Albino Carraro

5 January 1930 12	Ambrosiana	2–1	Napoli	Milan
	Blasevich 23', 47'	Report	90' Vojak I	Stadium: Campo Virgilio Fossati; Referee: Raffaele Mastellari

12 January 1930 13	Brescia	0–0	Ambrosiana	Brescia
		Report		Referee: Siro Galassi

19 January 1930 14	Ambrosiana	3–0	Torino	Milan
	Meazza 4', 55'; Serantoni 68'	Report		Stadium: Campo Virgilio Fossati; Referee: Giovanni Gonani

26 January 1930 15	Genoa	1–4	Ambrosiana	Genoa
	Banchero I 60'	Report	20' (pen.) Rivolta; 47', 84' Meazza; 55' Conti	Stadium: Campo Marassi; Referee: Francesco Mattea

1 February 1930 16	Juventus	v	Ambrosiana	Torino
10:00 CET		Report		Stadium: Stadio di Corso Marsiglia; Referee: Giuseppe Turbiani di Ferrara
Note: Match suspended due to snow issues.

16 February 1930 17	Ambrosiana	5–1	Modena	Milan
	Blasevich 28', 78'; Serantoni 30'; Visentin III 54'; Rivolta 71'	Report	84' Piccaluga	Stadium: Campo Virgilio Fossati; Referee: Giuseppe Scarpi

23 February 1930 18	Ambrosiana	6–2	Livorno	Milan
	Blasevich 15', 70'; Meazza 24', 42'; Rivolta 36' (pen.); Serantoni 75'	Report	19' Silvestri; 40' Palandri	Stadium: Campo Virgilio Fossati; Referee: Carlo Dani

9 March 1930 19	Ambrosiana	4–0	Pro Vercelli	Milan
	Blasevich 34'; Meazza 52', 61'; Povero 71'	Report		Stadium: Campo Virgilio Fossati; Referee: Giovanni Gonani

16 March 1930 20	Bologna	2–2	Ambrosiana	Bologna
	Busini I 25', 70' (pen.)	Report	23' Serantoni; 81' Blasevich	Stadium: Stadio Littoriale; Referee: Francesco Mattea

19 March 1930 16	Juventus	1–2	Ambrosiana	Torino
10:00 CET	Della Valle 56'	Report	32' Meazza; 61' Visentin III	Stadium: Stadio di Corso Marsiglia; Referee: Albino Carraro
Note: Match rescheduled from 2 February 1930.

23 March 1930 21	Ambrosiana	4–2	Lazio	Milan
	Blasevich 25'; Meazza 26', 33', 85'	Report	8' Spivach; 42' Ziroli	Stadium: Campo Virgilio Fossati; Referee: Cesare Lenti

30 March 1930 22	Cremonese	0–0	Ambrosiana	Cremona
		Report		Stadium: Stadio Giovanni Zini; Referee: Carlo Garbieri

13 April 1930 23	Ambrosiana	2–0	Milan	Milan
	Serantoni 19', 47'	Report		Stadium: Campo Virgilio Fossati; Referee: Francesco Mattea

20 April 1930 24	Padova	1–2	Ambrosiana	Padua
	Vecchina 72'	Report	20' Meazza; 62' Conti	Stadium: Stadio Silvio Appiani; Referee: Carlo Dani

27 April 1930 25	Ambrosiana	6–0	Roma	Milan
	Meazza 1', 3', 4', 40'; Visentin III 45'; Blasevich 65'	Report		Stadium: Campo Virgilio Fossati; Referee: Giovanni Gonani

4 May 1930 26	Triestina	1–2	Ambrosiana	Trieste
	Baldi 79'	Report	5' Blasevich; 76' Serantoni	Stadium: Stadio Montebello; Referee: Carlo Garbieri

18 May 1930 27	Ambrosiana	2–0	Alessandria	Milan
	Serantoni 53', 64'	Report		Stadium: Campo Virgilio Fossati; Referee: Giovanni Bruna

25 May 1930 28	Ambrosiana	8–0	Pro Patria	Milan
	Blasevich 27', 88'; Conti 29'; Serantoni 53', 61'; Rivolta 62'; Meazza 69', 79'	Report		Stadium: Campo Virgilio Fossati; Referee: Raffaele Scorzoni

29 May 1930 29	Napoli	3–1	Ambrosiana	Naples
	Perani II 44'; Sallustro I 58', 89'	Report	72' Serantoni	Stadium: Stadio Giorgio Ascarelli; Referee: Cesare Lenti

1 June 1930 30	Ambrosiana	5–1	Brescia	Milan
	Serantoni 14', 41'; Conti 23'; Meazza 69'; Rivolta 89'	Report	90' (pen.) Moretti	Stadium: Campo Virgilio Fossati; Referee: Ermenegildo Melandri

8 June 1930 31	Torino	4–1	Ambrosiana	Turin
	Rossetti 4'; Casaro 30'; Imberti 48', 69'	Report	45' Conti	Stadium: Campo Torino; Referee: Giovanni Gonani

15 June 1930 32	Ambrosiana	3–3	Genoa	Milan
	Meazza 22', 30', 53'	Report	4', 28' Levratto; 14' Bodini I	Stadium: Campo Virgilio Fossati; Referee: Albino Carraro

29 June 1930 33	Ambrosiana	2–0	Juventus	Milan
	Viani I 32'; Conti 67'	Report		Stadium: Campo Virgilio Fossati; Referee: Giuseppe Scarpi

6 July 1930 34	Modena	2–0	Ambrosiana	Modena
	Mazzoni 4'; Aimi 15'	Report		Stadium: Ex Velodromo; Referee: Cesare Lenti

== Statistics ==
=== Squad statistics ===
Competition	Points	Home						Away						Total						GD
Competition	Points	G	W	D	L	Gs	Ga	G	W	D	L	Gs	Ga	G	W	D	L	Gs	Ga	GD
Serie A	50	17	15	1	1	64	16	17	7	5	5	21	22	34	22	6	6	85	38	47
Total	-	17	15	1	1	64	16	17	7	5	5	21	22	34	22	6	6	85	38	47

=== Players statistics ===
No.	Pos	Nat	Player	Total		Serie A	
No.	Pos	Nat	Player	Apps	Goals	Apps	Goals
	GK	(Italy) ITA	Valentino Degani	29	-33	29	-33
	DF	(Italy) ITA	Luigi Allemandi	29	0	29	0
	DF	(Italy) ITA	Guido Gianfardoni	31	0	31	0
	MF	(Italy) ITA	Armando Castellazzi	32	0	32	0
	MF	(Italy) ITA	Enrico Rivolta	33	6	33	6
	MF	(Italy) ITA	Giuseppe Viani	31	1	31	1
	FW	(Kingdom of Yugoslavia) Yugoslavia	Antonio Blasevich	32	14	32	14
	FW	(Italy) ITA	Leopoldo Conti	25	8	25	8
	FW	(Italy) ITA	Giuseppe Meazza	33	31	33	31
	FW	(Italy) ITA	Pietro Serantoni	31	16	31	16
	FW	(Italy) ITA	Umberto Visentin	27	5	27	5
	GK	(Italy) ITA	Bonifacio Smerzi	5	-5	5	-5
	FW	(Italy) ITA	Pietro Povero	9	2	9	2
	FW	(Italy) ITA	Giulio Balestrini	9	2	9	2
	DF	(Italy) ITA	Giovanni Bolzoni	8	0	8	0
	DF	(Italy) ITA	Vincenzo Coppo	3	0	3	0
	MF	(Italy) ITA	Giovanni Gasparini	2	0	2	0
	MF	(Italy) ITA	Luigi Ciminaghi	1	0	1	0
	DF	(Italy) ITA	Stefano Gallio	1	0	1	0
	FW	(Italy) ITA	Luigi Pedrazzini	1	0	1	0
	MF	(Italy) ITA	Silvio Pietroboni	1	0	1	0
	FW	(Italy) ITA	Luigi Rizzi	1	0	1	0

== See also ==
- Fabrizio Melegari (a cura di). Almanacco illustrato del calcio, la storia 1898–2004. Modena, Panini, 2004.
- Carlo F. Chiesa. Il grande romanzo dello scudetto, da Calcio 2000, annate 2002 e 2003
