= List of Inter Milan players =

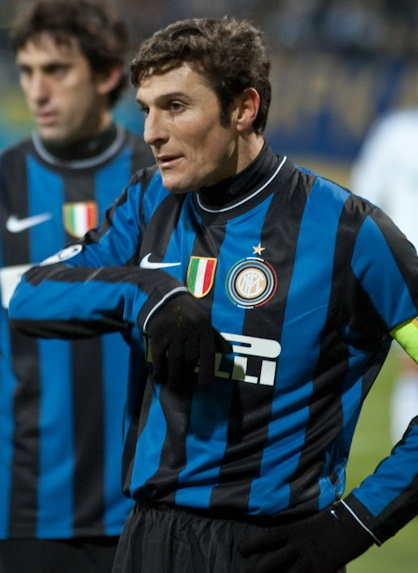
Javier Zanetti made 858 appearances in nineteen seasons with Internazionale. He was part of their 2009–10 UEFA Champions League winning squad.

Football Club Internazionale Milano is an Italian association football club based in Milan, Lombardy. The club was formed on 9 March 1908 to allow foreign players to play in Italy. Inter played its first competitive match on 10 January 1910 against their cross-town rivals Milan, in which they lost 3–2. The club won its very first title in 1910 – the 1909–10 Italian Football Championship. Since then, the club has won a further twenty league titles, along with ten Italian Cups and eight Italian Supercups. They have also been crowned champions of Europe on three occasions by winning two European Cups back-to-back in 1964 and 1965 and then another in 2010. The club experienced the most successful period in their history from 2006 to 2011, in which it won five successive league titles, equaling the all-time record at that time, by adding three Italian Cups, four Italian Supercups, one UEFA Champions League and one FIFA Club World Cup. During the 2009–10 season, Inter became the first and only Italian team to win the Treble and the second team to win five trophies in a calendar year.

Since playing their first competitive match, more than 900 players have appeared in competitive first-team matches for the club, some of whom have played at least 100 matches (including substitute appearances). Ronaldo, who was signed by Inter for a then world record fee of $27 million, fell one short of 100 appearances for the club, due to various injuries during his Inter career.

As of 2026, more than 150 players have played at least 100 matches for the club.

== List of players ==
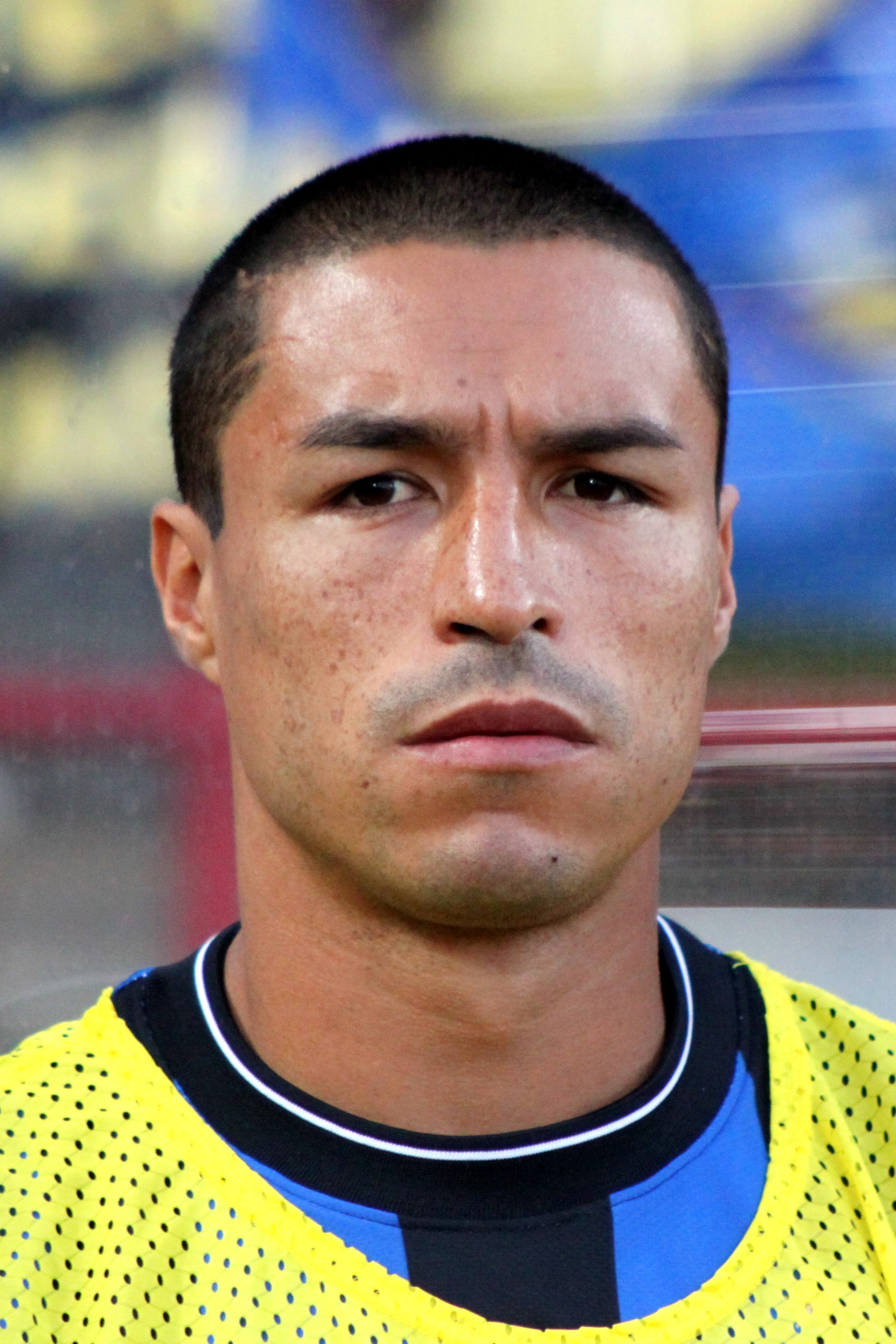
Iván Córdoba made 455 appearances in twelve seasons with Inter.

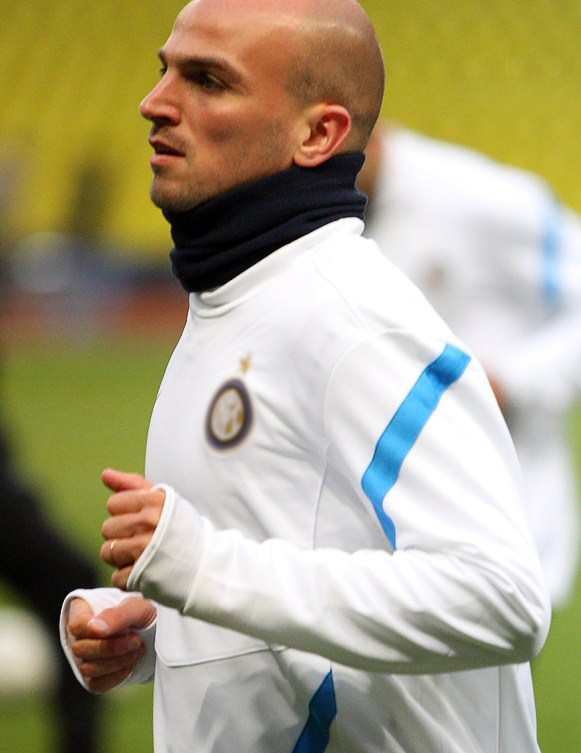
Esteban Cambiasso made 431 appearances and scored 51 goals for Inter.

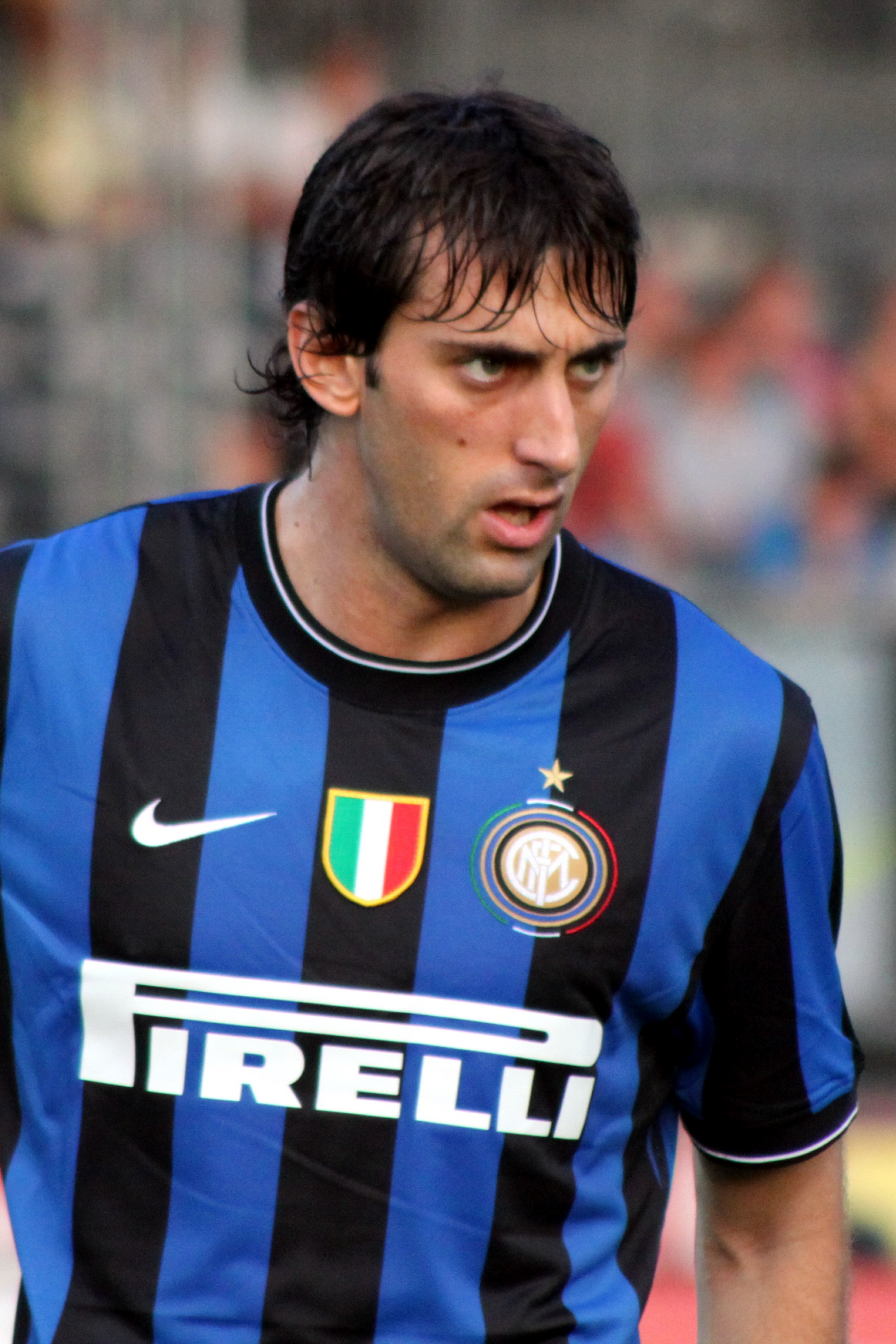
Diego Milito was one of the main protagonists during the treble season.

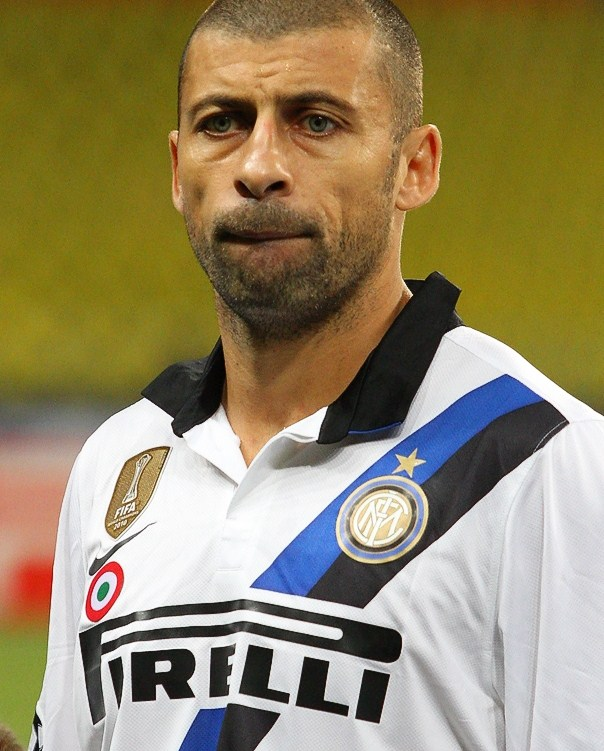
Walter Samuel made 300 appearances in nine seasons.

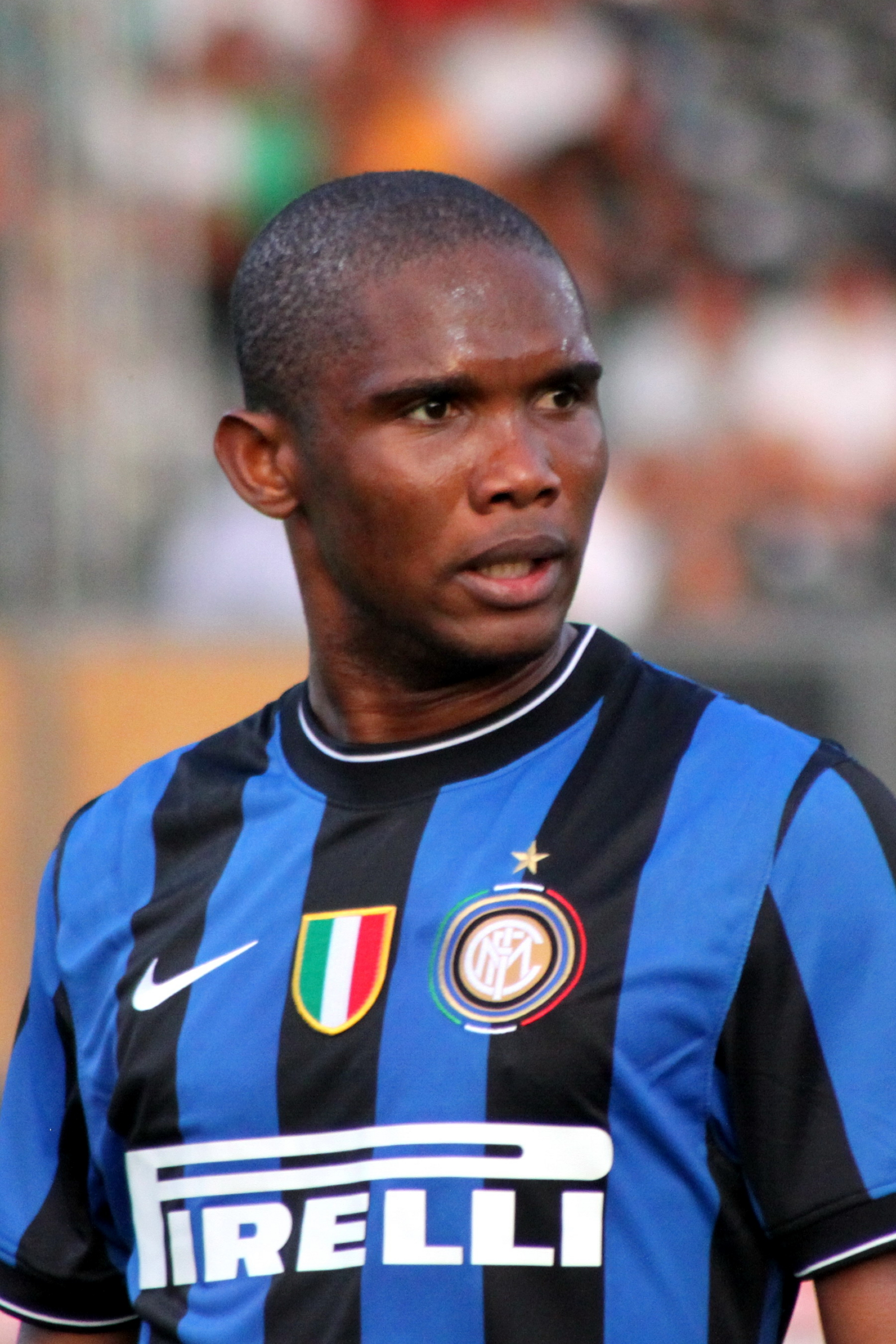
Samuel Eto'o played 102 matches and scored 53 goals.

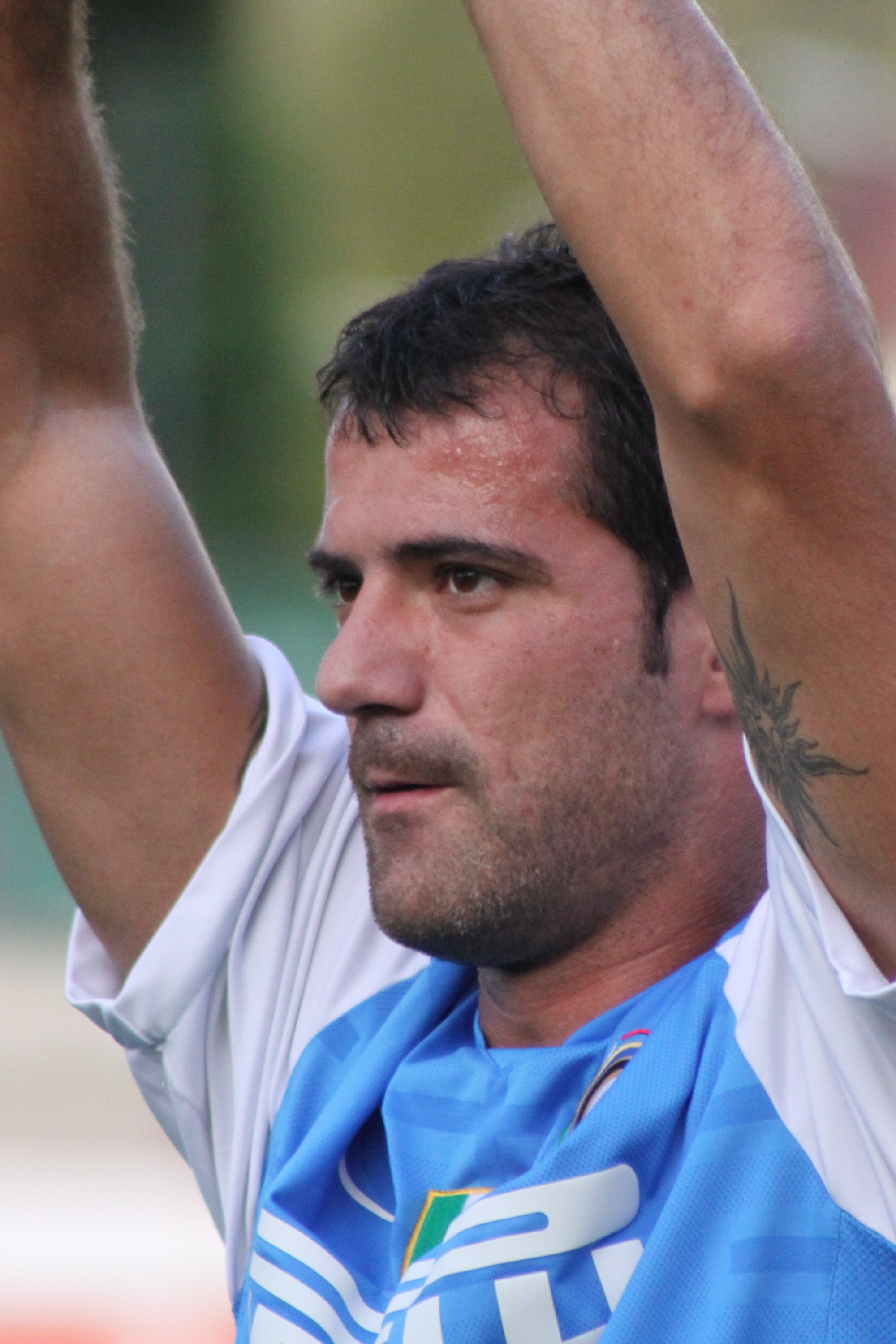
The UEFA Champions League winner Dejan Stanković played for nine-and-a-half seasons with Inter.

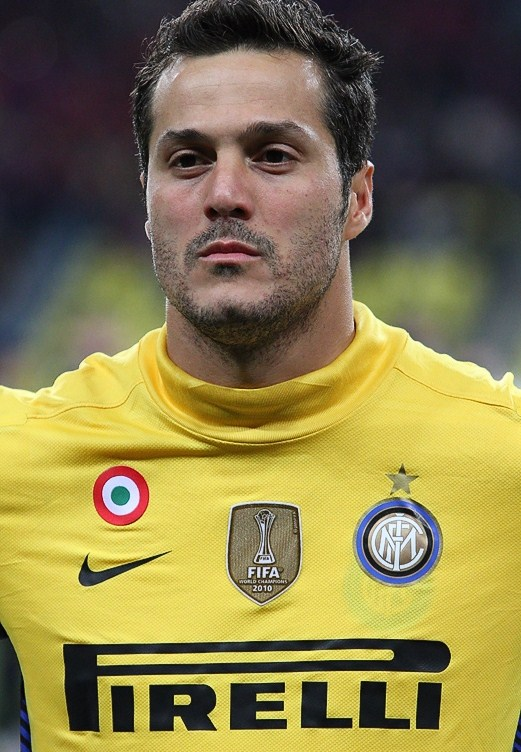
Júlio César made 235 appearances in seven seasons.

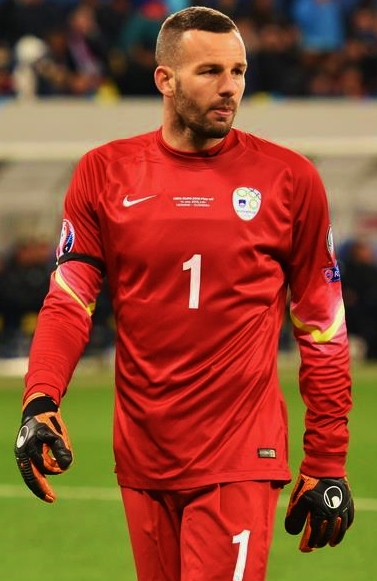
Samir Handanović made 455 appearances in eleven seasons with Inter.

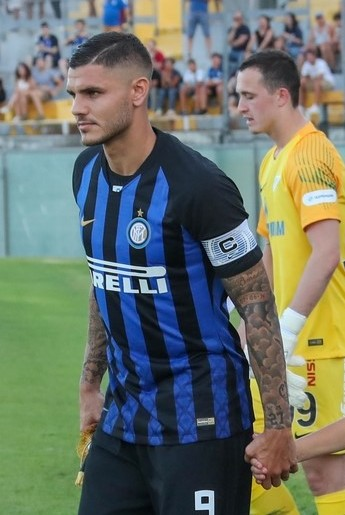
Mauro Icardi played 219 matches and scored 124 goals.

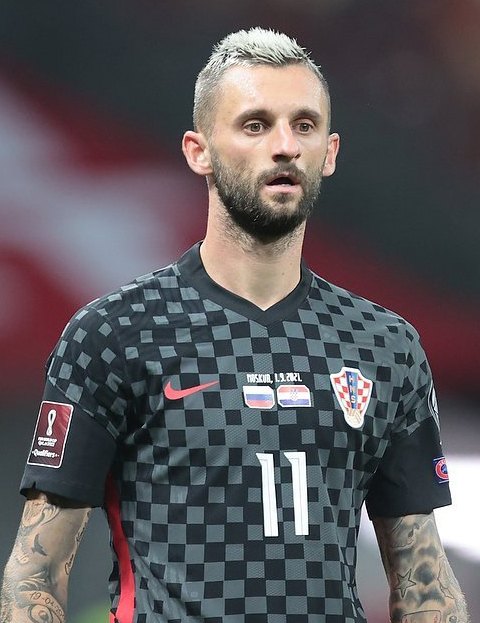
Marcelo Brozović played for eight-and-a-half seasons with Inter.

- Appearances and goals are for first-team competitive matches only, including Serie A, Coppa Italia, Supercoppa Italiana, UEFA Europa League/UEFA Cup, European Cup/Champions League, Cup Winners' Cup, Inter-Cities Fairs Cup, Super Cup and Club World Cup matches.
- Players are listed in alphabetical order.

Statistics correct as of 8 November 2026.

Table headers

- Nationality – If a player played international football, the country or countries he played for are shown. Otherwise, the player's nationality is given as his country of birth.
- Inter career – The year of the player's first appearance for Inter Milan to the year of his last appearance.
- Appearances – The total number of games played, both as a starter and as a substitute.

Positions key
Pre-1960s		Post-1960s	
GK	Goalkeeper		
FB	Full back	DF	Defender
HB	Half back	MF	Midfielder
FW	Forward		
U	Utility player (Note: A utility player is someone who is recognised for their ability to perform in multiple positions.)		

List of Internazionale players with at least 100 appearances
Player	Nationality	Position	Inter career	Appearances	Goals	Ref(s)
Francesco Acerbi	Italy	DF	2022–2026	148	5	
Camillo Achilli	Italy	HB	1945–1951	198	19	
Adriano	Brazil	FW	2001–2002; 2004–2008; 2008–2009	177	74	
Ermanno Aebi	Italy	HB	1909–1922	142	106	
Emilio Agradi	Italy	HB	1914–1928	166	62	
Luigi Allemandi	Italy	FB	1927–1935	207	0	
Alessandro Altobelli	Italy	FW	1977–1988	466	209	
Antonio Angelillo	Argentina; Italy	FW	1957–1961	127	77	
Gino Armano	Italy	FW	1948–1956	255	73	
Carlos Augusto	Brazil	DF	2023–present	154	10	
Salvatore Bagni	Italy	MF	1981–1984	121	17	
Giuseppe Ballerio	Italy	FB	1932–1940	102	0	
Nicolò Barella	Italy	MF	2019–present	349	29	
Giuseppe Baresi	Italy	DF	1977–1992	559	13	
Alessandro Bastoni	Italy	DF	2019–present	311	9	
Sergio Battistini	Italy	DF	1990–1994	155	13	
Evaristo Beccalossi	Italy	MF	1978–1984	216	37	
Gianfranco Bedin	Italy	MF	1964–1974	310	23	
Mauro Bellugi	Italy	DF	1969–1974	137	1	
Emre Belözoğlu	Turkey	MF	2001–2005	115	5	
Giuseppe Bergomi	Italy	DF	1979–1999	756	28	
Nicola Berti	Italy	MF	1988–1997	311	41	
Mario Bertini	Italy	MF	1968–1977	295	38	
Alessandro Bianchi	Italy	MF	1988–1996	236	13	
Mauro Bicicli	Italy	FW	1955–1967	182	27	
Graziano Bini	Italy	DF	1972–1985	343	13	
Yann Bisseck	Germany	DF	2023–present	116	10	
Bruno Bolchi	Italy	DF	1958–1963	125	10	
Roberto Boninsegna	Italy	FW	1969–1976	281	171	
Ivano Bordon	Italy	GK	1970–1983	382	0	
Andreas Brehme	Germany	DF	1988–1992	154	12	
Marcelo Brozović	Croatia	MF	2015–2023	335	34	
Carmelo Buonocore	Italy	FB	1936–1945	158	0	
Nicolás Burdisso	Argentina	DF	2004–2009	140	8	
Tarcisio Burgnich	Italy	DF	1962–1974	467	6	
Hakan Çalhanoğlu	Turkey	MF	2021–present	225	53	
Esteban Cambiasso	Argentina	MF	2004–2014	431	51	
Aldo Campatelli	Italy	HB	1936–1950	297	39	
Piero Campelli	Italy	GK	1910–1925	179	0	
Enrico Candiani	Italy	FW	1937–1946	169	59	
Antonio Candreva	Italy	MF	2016–2020	153	18	
Nazzareno Canuti	Italy	DF	1974–1982	183	1	
Armando Castellazzi	Italy	HB	1923–1936	261	16	
Benoît Cauet	France	MF	1997–2001	146	8	
Carlo Ceresoli	Italy	GK	1932–1936	129	0	
Luigi Cevenini	Italy	HB	1912–1915; 1919–1921; 1922–1927	190	158	
Cristian Chivu	Romania	U	2007–2014	169	3	
Fulvio Collovati	Italy	DF	1982–1986	168	8	
Severo Cominelli	Italy	HB	1941–1943; 1945–1946	118	6	
Leopoldo Conti	Italy	FW	1919–1920; 1922–1931	222	75	
Iván Córdoba	Colombia	DF	2000–2012	455	18	
Mario Corso	Italy	MF	1957–1973	502	94	
Hernán Crespo	Argentina	FW	2002–2003; 2006–2009	116	45	
Julio Cruz	Argentina	FW	2003–2009	196	75	
Danilo D'Ambrosio	Italy	DF	2014–2023	290	23	
Matteo Darmian	Italy	DF	2020–2026	218	13	
Stefan de Vrij	Netherlands	DF	2018–2026	296	13	
Attilio Demaría	Argentina; Italy	U	1931–1943	295	86	
Valentino Degani	Italy	GK	1924–1925; 1926–1928	176	0	
Luigi Di Biagio	Italy	MF	1999–2003	163	18	
Federico Dimarco	Italy	DF	2014–2016; 2019–2020; 2021–present	250	26	
Youri Djorkaeff	France	MF	1996–1999	127	39	
Angelo Domenghini	Italy	FW	1964–1969	164	54	
Denzel Dumfries	Netherlands	DF	2021–2026	207	27	
Edin Džeko	Bosnia and Herzegovina	FW	2021–2023	102	31	
Oscar Engler	Switzerland	FB	1909–1915	102	18	
Samuel Eto'o	Cameroon	FW	2009–2011	102	53	
Giacinto Facchetti	Italy	DF	1960–1978	634	75	
Pietro Fanna	Italy	MF	1985–1989	146	14	
Osvaldo Fattori	Italy	HB	1947–1954	178	7	
Adriano Fedele	Italy	DF	1973–1979	192	13	
Giovanni Ferrari	Italy	HB	1935–1940	125	33	
Pietro Ferraris	Italy	FW	1936–1941	162	56	
Riccardo Ferri	Italy	DF	1981–1994	418	8	
Luís Figo	Portugal	MF	2005–2009	140	11	
Eddie Firmani	Italy	FW	1958–1961	103	69	
Livio Fongaro	Italy	HB	1955–1961	174	0	
Davide Fontolan	Italy	MF	1990–1996	160	16	
Angelo Franzosi	Italy	GK	1941–1951	192	0	
Davide Frattesi	Italy	MF	2023–present	121	15	
Salvatore Fresi	Italy	DF	1995–1998; 1999–2000	123	1	
Annibale Frossi	Italy	HB	1936–1942	147	49	
Roberto Gagliardini	Italy	MF	2017–2023	191	16	
Giorgio Ghezzi	Italy	GK	1951–1958	191	0	
Giovanni Giacomazzi	Italy	FB	1949–1957	211	3	
Guido Gianfardoni	Italy	FB	1926–1931; 1932–1933	128	1	
Attilio Giovannini	Italy	HB	1948–1954	191	0	
Mario Giubertoni	Italy	DF	1970–1976	214	2	
Aristide Guarneri	Italy	DF	1958–1967; 1969–1970	335	3	
Fredy Guarín	Colombia	MF	2012–2016	141	23	
Samir Handanović	Slovenia	GK	2012–2023	455	0	
Zlatan Ibrahimović	Sweden	FW	2006–2009	116	66	
Mauro Icardi	Argentina	FW	2013–2019	219	124	
Giovanni Invernizzi	Italy	HB	1949–1950; 1951–1952; 1954–1960	148	6	
Jair	Brazil	FW	1962–1972	260	69	
Juan Jesus	Brazil	DF	2012–2016	142	1	
Júlio César	Brazil	GK	2005–2012	300	0	
Jürgen Klinsmann	Germany	FW	1989–1992	123	40	
Spartaco Landini	Italy	DF	1962–1970	136	1	
Bengt Lindskog	Sweden	MF	1958–1961	102	35	
Ugo Locatelli	Italy	HB	1936–1941	168	1	
Benito Lorenzi	Italy	FW	1947–1958	314	143	
Lúcio	Brazil	DF	2009–2012	136	5	
Romelu Lukaku	Belgium	FW	2019–2021; 2022–2023	133	78	
Maicon	Brazil	DF	2006–2012	249	20	
Andrea Mandorlini	Italy	MF	1984–1991	275	13	
Giampiero Marini	Italy	MF	1975–1986	375	13	
Obafemi Martins	Nigeria	FW	2002–2006	136	49	
Lautaro Martínez	Argentina	FW	2018–present	383	181	
Enea Masiero	Italy	MF	1955–1964	168	12	
Gianfranco Matteoli	Italy	MF	1986–1990	167	8	
Lothar Matthäus	Germany	MF	1988–1992	153	53	
Marco Materazzi	Italy	DF	2001–2011	276	20	
Maxwell	Brazil	DF	2006–2009	105	2	
Sandro Mazzola	Italy	FW	1960–1977	565	158	
Giuseppe Meazza	Italy	FW	1927–1940; 1946–1947	408	284	
Gary Medel	Chile	U	2014–2017	109	1	
Andrea Milani	Italy	HB	1941–1947	101	0	
Diego Milito	Argentina	FW	2009–2014	171	75	
Miranda	Brazil	DF	2015–2019	121	1	
Henrikh Mkhitaryan	Armenia	MF	2022–present	195	12	
Carlo Muraro	Italy	FW	1972–1981; 1983–1985	193	55	
Yuto Nagatomo	Japan	U	2011–2018	210	11	
Fulvio Nesti	Italy	HB	1952–1957	125	6	
Maino Neri	Italy	HB	1951–1955	109	0	
István Nyers	Hungary	FW	1948–1954	182	133	
Renato Olmi	Italy	HB	1937–1941; 1942–1943	129	1	
Angelo Orlando	Italy	MF	1991–1995	125	0	
Gabriele Oriali	Italy	MF	1970–1983	392	43	
Antonio Paganin	Italy	DF	1990–1995	142	1	
Massimo Paganin	Italy	DF	1993–1997	151	2	
Gianluca Pagliuca	Italy	GK	1994–1999	234	0	
Rodrigo Palacio	Argentina	FW	2012–2017	169	58	
Giancarlo Pasinato	Italy	MF	1978–1982; 1983–1985	185	11	
Ubaldo Passalacqua	Italy	FB	1942–1949	120	0	
Ivan Perišić	Croatia	U	2015–2022	254	55	
Giuseppe Peruchetti	Italy	GK	1936–1940	115	0	
Armando Picchi	Italy	DF	1960–1967	257	2	
Silvio Pietroboni	Italy	HB	1919–1933	194	9	
Andrea Ranocchia	Italy	DF	2010–2016; 2016–2022	226	14	
Álvaro Recoba	Uruguay	FW	1997–2008	261	72	
Enrico Rivolta	Italy	HB	1922–1933	271	54	
Karl-Heinz Rummenigge	Germany	FW	1984–1987	107	42	
Antonio Sabato	Italy	MF	1976–1977; 1982–1985	122	7	
Walter Samuel	Argentina	DF	2005–2014	235	17	
Alexis Sánchez	Chile	FW	2019–2022; 2023–2024	142	24	
Davide Santon	Italy	DF	2008–2011; 2015–2018	110	0	
Giuliano Sarti	Italy	GK	1963–1968	198	0	
Pietro Serantoni	Italy	HB	1928–1934	164	58	
Aldo Serena	Italy	FW	1978–1979; 1981–1982; 1983–1984; 1987–1991	223	78	
Lennart Skoglund	Sweden	HB	1950–1959	246	57	
Milan Škriniar	Slovakia	DF	2017–2023	250	11	
Wesley Sneijder	Netherlands	MF	2009–2013	116	22	
Yann Sommer	Switzerland	GK	2023–2026	139	0	
Ruben Sosa	Uruguay	FW	1992–1995	104	50	
Dejan Stanković	Serbia	MF	2004–2013	326	42	
Luis Suárez	Spain	MF	1961–1970	328	54	
Marcus Thuram	France	FW	2023–present	154	57	
Francesco Toldo	Italy	GK	2001–2010	233	0	
Borja Valero	Spain	MF	2017–2020	102	6	
Matías Vecino	Uruguay	FW	2017–2022	130	15	
Giuseppe Viani	Italy	HB	1928–1934	148	11	
Lido Vieri	Italy	GK	1969–1976	199	0	
Christian Vieri	Italy	FW	1999–2005	190	123	
Guido Vincenzi	Italy	FB	1953–1958	109	4	
Umberto Visentin	Italy	FW	1928–1933	124	27	
Aron Winter	Netherlands	MF	1996–1999	119	3	
Iván Zamorano	Chile	FW	1996–2001	149	41	
Javier Zanetti	Argentina	U	1995–2014	858	21	
Cristiano Zanetti	Italy	MF	1998–2000; 2001–2006	146	3	
Walter Zenga	Italy	GK	1982–1994	473	0	
Piotr Zieliński	Poland	MF	2024–present	102	12	

== Club captains ==
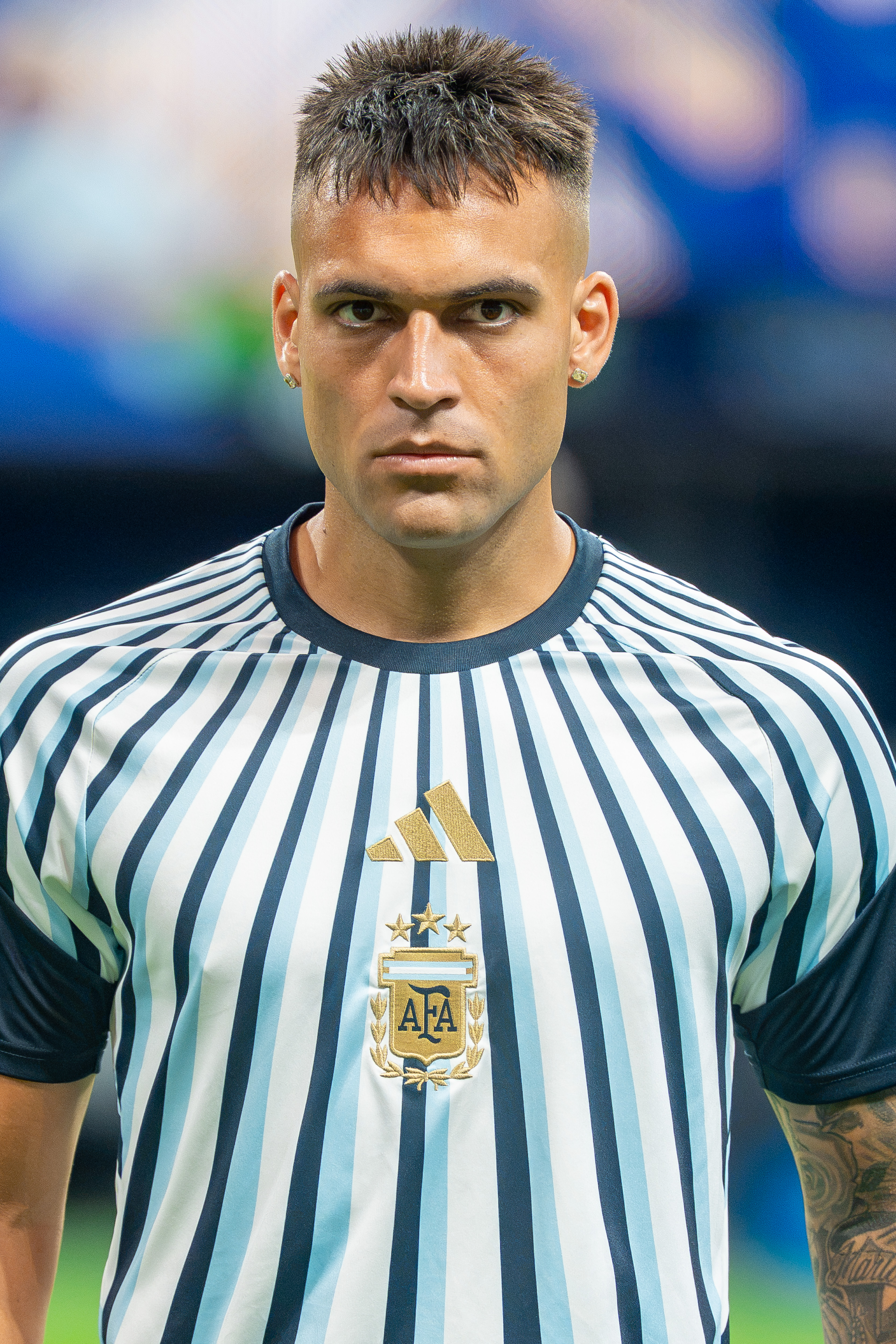
Lautaro Martínez is the current captain of the club.

Since 1908, 27 players have held the position of club captain for Internazionale. The first club captain was Hernst Marktl, who filled the role for the inaugural season. The longest-serving club captain is Javier Zanetti, who captained the club from 2001 to 2014. Zanetti also has the distinction of having won the most trophies as club captain, with 15; he won five Serie A titles, four Italian Cups, four Italian Super Cups, one UEFA Champions League title and one FIFA Club World Cup.

List of Internazionale club captains
Dates	Player	Nationality	Notes
1909	Hernst Marktl	(Germany)	First club captain and one of the charter members of the club
1909–1915	Virgilio Fossati	(Italy)	First club captain from Italy
1915–1922	Ermanno Aebi	(Switzerland) (Italy)	
1922–1931	Leopoldo Conti	(Italy)	
1931–1940	Giuseppe Meazza	(Italy)	
1940–1943	Attilio Demaría	(Argentina) (Italy)	
1943–1950	Aldo Campatelli	(Italy)	
1950–1954	Attilio Giovannini	(Italy)	
1954–1956	Gino Armano	(Italy)	
1956–1957	Giovanni Giacomazzi	(Italy)	
1957–1958	Giovanni Invernizzi	(Italy)	
1958–1961	Antonio Angelillo	(Argentina) (Italy)	
1961–1962	Bruno Bolchi	(Italy)	
1962–1967	Armando Picchi	(Italy)	
1967–1970	Mario Corso	(Italy)	
1970–1977	Sandro Mazzola	(Italy)	
1977–1978	Giacinto Facchetti	(Italy)	
1978–1985	Graziano Bini	(Italy)	
1985–1988	Alessandro Altobelli	(Italy)	
1988–1992	Giuseppe Baresi	(Italy)	
1992–1999	Giuseppe Bergomi	(Italy)	
1999–2001	Ronaldo	(Brazil)	
2001–2014	Javier Zanetti	(Argentina)	Led the team to more official trophies (15) than any other Inter captain
2014–2015	Andrea Ranocchia	(Italy)	
2015–2019	Mauro Icardi	(Argentina)	
2019–2023	Samir Handanovič	(Slovenia)	
2023–present	Lautaro Martínez	(Argentina)	

== Honours ==
List of players who won at least ten trophies with Internazionale.

Rank	Player	SA	CI	SCI	UCL	EL	FCWC IC	Total
1	(Argentina) Javier Zanetti	5	4	4	1	1	1	16
2	(Argentina) Esteban Cambiasso	5	4	4	1	-	1	15
2	(Colombia) Iván Córdoba	5	4	4	1	-	1	15
2	(Italy) Marco Materazzi	5	4	4	1	-	1	15
2	(Serbia) Dejan Stanković	5	4	4	1	-	1	15
6	(Brazil) Júlio César	5	3	4	1	-	1	14
6	(Italy) Paolo Orlandoni	5	3	4	1	-	1	14
8	(Argentina) Walter Samuel	5	3	4	1	-	-	13
9	(Italy) Francesco Toldo	5	3	3	1	-	-	12
10	(Brazil) Maicon	4	2	3	1	-	1	11

== See also ==
- Serie A winning players
- Inter Milan and the Italy national football team
- Inter Milan Hall of Fame
