= Gallio =

Gallio may refer to:

== People ==
- Lucius Junius Gallio Annaeanus (1–65), Roman governor of Achaea
- Stefano Gallio (born 1908), Italian footballer
- Tolomeo Gallio (1527–1607), Italian Cardinal

== Other uses ==
- Gallio, Veneto, town in Vicenza, Veneto, Italy
- Gallio (skipper), genus of skipper butterflies in the family Hesperiidae

== See also ==
- Gallia (disambiguation)
- Galio (disambiguation)
