= Galio =

Galio may refer to:

- Galio, Liberia, a town in Grand Gedeh County
- Galio, a League of Legends character voiced in English by Josh Petersdorf
- Galio Arbelo, Cuban cyclist, gold medalist in the men's team time trial in cycling at the 1971 Pan American Games

== See also ==
- Gallio (disambiguation)
