= Ludueña =

Ludueña is a Spanish surname. Notable people with the surname include:

- Arturo Chini Ludueña (1904 – 1993), Argentine professional footballer
- Daniel Emmanuel Ludueña (born 1982), Argentine former professional footballer
- Gonzalo Ludueña (born 1986), Argentine former professional footballer

== See also ==
- Fortín de Ludueña
- Ludueña Stream
