= Calcio =

Calcio may refer to:

- Football in Italy
- Calcio storico fiorentino, an early form of football that originated in 16th-century Italy
- Calcio 2000, Italian football magazine
- Calcio, Lombardy, a town and commune in the province of Bergamo, Lombardy, Italy
