= Inter Milan Hall of Fame =

- Sport: Association football
- Awarded for: Football players and personalities that have contributed to Inter Milan history
- Local name: Inter Hall of Fame (Italian)
- Country: Italy
- Presented by: Inter Milan

History
- First award: 2018
- Editions: 5
- First winner: Walter Zenga (ITA); Javier Zanetti (ARG); Lothar Matthäus (GER); Ronaldo (BRA); The Moratti family
- Most recent: Ivano Bordon (ITA); Maicon (BRA); Sandro Mazzola (ITA); Christian Vieri (ITA)
- Website: Official website

This is a list of Inter players who have been inducted into the club's Hall of Fame.

== History and regulations ==
Inter's Hall of Fame was launched in 2018 as a yearly competition as part of the initiatives for the club's 110th anniversary. To be eligible, players must have made at least 60 competitive appearances for Inter, have won at least one trophy with Inter, and have been retired for at least three years.

During the initial two editions in 2018 and 2019, fans used electronic voting to select four shortlisted players, one for each position (goalkeeper, defender, midfielder, and forward). Subsequently, winners in each category (a goalkeeper, a defender, a midfielder, and a forward) were determined from three candidates per position through voting from:

- national and international media;
- players from all of the Inter teams, from the Pulcini to the First Team.
- Inter employees and collaborators;
- existing Hall of Famers once they've been elected.

Starting from the 2020 edition, the shortlist has been eliminated, and the four winners are now directly chosen through voting by fans, players from all of Inter's teams, club employees, individuals previously inducted into the Hall of Fame, and representatives from major national and international newspapers.

Also since the 2020 edition, branded as Timeless Edition to celebrate the tenth anniversary of the treble, former Inter players from the 2009–10 season have become eligible – irrespective of whether they have been retired for at least three years.

== List of Hall of Fame players ==
Positions key
GK	Goalkeeper
DF	Defender
MF	Midfielder
FW	Forward

Year	Player	Pos.	Inter career	Apps.	Goals	Honours with Inter	Ref.
2018	(Italy) Walter Zenga	GK	1982–1994	473	0	1988–89 Serie A, 1989 Supercoppa Italiana, 1990–91 UEFA Cup, 1993–94 UEFA Cup	
2018	(Argentina) Javier Zanetti	DF	1995–2014	858	21	2005–06 Serie A, 2006–07 Serie A, 2007–08 Serie A, 2008–09 Serie A, 2009–10 Serie A, 2004–05 Coppa Italia, 2005–06 Coppa Italia, 2009–10 Coppa Italia, 2010–11 Coppa Italia, 2005 Supercoppa Italiana, 2006 Supercoppa Italiana, 2008 Supercoppa Italiana, 2010 Supercoppa Italiana, 2009–10 UEFA Champions League, 1997–98 UEFA Cup, 2010 FIFA Club World Cup	
2018	(Germany) Lothar Matthäus	MF	1988–1992	153	53	1988–89 Serie A, 1989 Supercoppa Italiana, 1990–91 UEFA Cup	
2018	(Brazil) Ronaldo	FW	1997–2002	99	59	1997–98 UEFA Cup	
2019	(Italy) Francesco Toldo	GK	2001–2010	232	0	2005–06 Serie A, 2006–07 Serie A, 2007–08 Serie A, 2008–09 Serie A, 2009–10 Serie A, 2004–05 Coppa Italia, 2005–06 Coppa Italia, 2009–10 Coppa Italia, 2005 Supercoppa Italiana, 2006 Supercoppa Italiana, 2008 Supercoppa Italiana, 2009–10 UEFA Champions League	
2019	(Italy) Giacinto Facchetti	DF	1960–1978	629	75	1962–63 Serie A, 1964–65 Serie A, 1965–66 Serie A, 1970–71 Serie A, 1977–78 Coppa Italia, 1963–64 European Cup, 1964–65 European Cup, 1964 Intercontinental Cup, 1965 Intercontinental Cup	
2019	(Serbia) Dejan Stanković	MF	2004–2013	326	42	2005–06 Serie A, 2006–07 Serie A, 2007–08 Serie A, 2008–09 Serie A, 2009–10 Serie A, 2004–05 Coppa Italia, 2005–06 Coppa Italia, 2009–10 Coppa Italia, 2010–11 Coppa Italia, 2005 Supercoppa Italiana, 2006 Supercoppa Italiana, 2008 Supercoppa Italiana, 2010 Supercoppa Italiana, 2009–10 UEFA Champions League, 2010 FIFA Club World Cup	
2019	(Italy) Giuseppe Meazza	FW	1927–1940 1946–1947	408	284	1929–30 Serie A, 1937–38 Serie A, 1939–40 Serie A, 1938–39 Coppa Italia	
2020	(Brazil) Júlio César	GK	2005–2012	300	0	2005–06 Serie A, 2006–07 Serie A, 2007–08 Serie A, 2008–09 Serie A, 2009–10 Serie A, 2005–06 Coppa Italia, 2009–10 Coppa Italia, 2010–11 Coppa Italia, 2005 Supercoppa Italiana, 2006 Supercoppa Italiana, 2008 Supercoppa Italiana, 2010 Supercoppa Italiana, 2009–10 UEFA Champions League, 2010 FIFA Club World Cup	
2020	(Italy) Giuseppe Bergomi	DF	1979–1999	756	28	1988–89 Serie A, 1981–82 Coppa Italia, 1989 Supercoppa Italiana, 1990–91 UEFA Cup, 1993–94 UEFA Cup, 1997–98 UEFA Cup	
2020	(Argentina) Esteban Cambiasso	MF	2004–2014	430	51	2005–06 Serie A, 2006–07 Serie A, 2007–08 Serie A, 2008–09 Serie A, 2009–10 Serie A, 2004–05 Coppa Italia, 2005–06 Coppa Italia, 2009–10 Coppa Italia, 2010–11 Coppa Italia, 2005 Supercoppa Italiana, 2006 Supercoppa Italiana, 2008 Supercoppa Italiana, 2010 Supercoppa Italiana, 2009–10 UEFA Champions League, 2010 FIFA Club World Cup	
2020	(Argentina) Diego Milito	FW	2009–2014	171	75	2009–10 Serie A, 2009–10 Coppa Italia, 2010–11 Coppa Italia, 2010 Supercoppa Italiana, 2009–10 UEFA Champions League, 2010 FIFA Club World Cup	
2021	(Italy) Gianluca Pagliuca	GK	1994–1999	234	0	1997–98 UEFA Cup	
2021	(Italy) Marco Materazzi	DF	2001–2011	276	20	2005–06 Serie A, 2006–07 Serie A, 2007–08 Serie A, 2008–09 Serie A, 2009–10 Serie A, 2004–05 Coppa Italia, 2005–06 Coppa Italia, 2009–10 Coppa Italia, 2010–11 Coppa Italia, 2005 Supercoppa Italiana, 2006 Supercoppa Italiana, 2008 Supercoppa Italiana, 2010 Supercoppa Italiana, 2009–10 UEFA Champions League, 2010 FIFA Club World Cup	
2021	(Netherlands) Wesley Sneijder	MF	2009–2013	116	22	2009–10 Coppa Italia, 2009–10 Serie A, 2009–10 UEFA Champions League, 2010 Supercoppa Italiana, 2010 FIFA Club World Cup, 2010–11 Coppa Italia	
2021	(Cameroon) Samuel Eto'o	FW	2009–2011	102	53	2009–10 Coppa Italia, 2009–10 Serie A, 2009–10 UEFA Champions League, 2010 Supercoppa Italiana, 2010 FIFA Club World Cup, 2010–11 Coppa Italia	
2022	(Italy) Ivano Bordon	GK	1970–1983	388	0	1970–71 Serie A, 1977–78 Coppa Italia, 1979–80 Serie A, 1981–82 Coppa Italia	
2022	(Brazil) Maicon	DF	2006–2012	248	20	2006–07 Serie A, 2007–08 Serie A, 2008–09 Serie A, 2009–10 Serie A, 2009–10 Coppa Italia, 2010–11 Coppa Italia, 2006 Supercoppa Italiana, 2008 Supercoppa Italiana, 2010 Supercoppa Italiana, 2009–10 UEFA Champions League, 2010 FIFA Club World Cup	
2022	(Italy) Sandro Mazzola	MF	1960–1977	570	162	1962–63 Serie A, 1964–65 Serie A, 1965–66 Serie A, 1970–71 Serie A, 1963–64 European Cup, 1964–65 European Cup, 1964 Intercontinental Cup, 1965 Intercontinental Cup	
2022	(Italy) Christian Vieri	FW	1999–2005	190	123	2004–05 Coppa Italia	

=== Special award ===
Year	Name	Notes	Ref.
2018	The Moratti family	Angelo (from 1955 to 1968) and Massimo Moratti (from 1995 to 2004 and from 2006 to 2013) were chairmen of the club	
2019	Astutillo Malgioglio	Goalkeeper from 1986 to 1991. Awarded with Premio Brothers Universally United	
2020	Ernesto Pellegrini	Chairman from 1984 to 1995	
2021	Giuseppe Prisco	Vice-chairman from 1963 to 2001	

== List of candidates ==
The 2018 and 2019 editions of the Hall of Fame saw the creation of a shortlist of four players, one per role, decided through fans' votes. Since the 2020 edition, the shortlist is no longer in use.

2018

- Goalkeepers: Francesco Toldo, Gianluca Pagliuca, Walter Zenga
- Defenders: Giuseppe Bergomi, Giacinto Facchetti, Javier Zanetti
- Midfielders: Sandro Mazzola, Lothar Matthäus, Dejan Stanković
- Forwards: Giuseppe Meazza, Ronaldo, Alessandro Altobelli

2019

- Goalkeepers: Gianluca Pagliuca, Giuliano Sarti, Francesco Toldo
- Defenders: Giuseppe Bergomi, Giacinto Facchetti, Marco Materazzi
- Midfielders: Nicola Berti, Sandro Mazzola, Dejan Stanković
- Forwards: Giuseppe Meazza, Christian Vieri, Alessandro Altobelli

== See also ==
- List of Inter Milan players (100+ appearances)
- List of Inter Milan players (25–99 appearances)
