= Martinengo (Italy) =

- Comune
- Comune di Martinengo
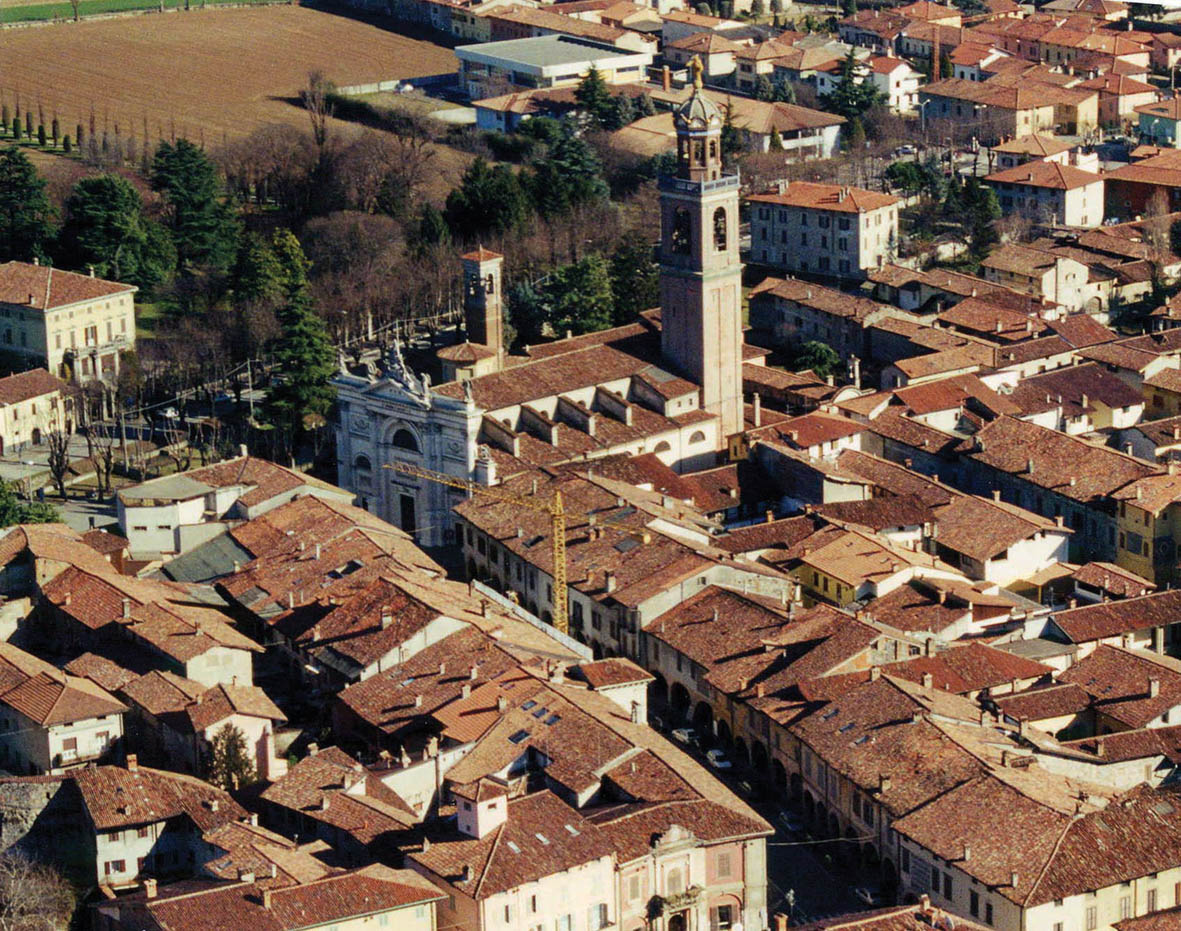
- Martinengo

- Coat of arms

- Location within Italy Location within Lombardy
- Coordinates: 45°34′N 9°46′E
- Country: Italy
- Region: Lombardy
- Province: Province of Bergamo (BG)
- Frazioni: Cortenuova di Sopra

Area
  - Total: 21.7 km^{2} (8.4 sq mi)
- Elevation: 149 m (489 ft)

Population (Dec. 2004)
  - Total: 9,138
  - Density: 421/km^{2} (1,090/sq mi)
- Demonym: Martinenghesi
- Time zone: UTC+1 (CET)
  - Summer (DST): UTC+2 (CEST)
- Postal code: 24057
- Dialing code: 0363
- Website: Official website

Martinengo (Bergamasque: Martinèngh) is a comune (municipality) in the Province of Bergamo in the Italian region of Lombardy, located about 50 kilometres (31 mi) east of Milan and about 15 kilometres (9 mi) southeast of Bergamo. As of 31 December 2004, it had a population of 9,138 and an area of 21.7 square kilometres (8.4 mi^{2}).

The municipality of Martinengo contains the frazione (subdivision) Cortenuova di Sopra.

Martinengo borders the municipalities of Cividate al Piano, Cologno al Serio, Cortenuova, Ghisalba, Morengo, Mornico al Serio, Palosco, and Romano di Lombardia.

The municipality is home to the mother house of the Congregation of the Holy Family of Bergamo.

== Demographic evolution ==
Historical population

Year	Pop.	±%
1861	4,350	—
1871	4,782	+9.9%
1881	5,116	+7.0%
1901	5,544	+8.4%
1911	5,581	+0.7%

Year	Pop.	±%
1921	6,012	+7.7%
1931	6,074	+1.0%
1936	5,872	−3.3%
1951	6,219	+5.9%
1961	5,721	−8.0%

Year	Pop.	±%
1971	6,384	+11.6%
1981	7,214	+13.0%
1991	7,835	+8.6%
2001	8,570	+9.4%
2011	10,088	+17.7%

Source: Data from ISTAT
