= Mornico al Serio =

- Comune
- Comune di Mornico al Serio
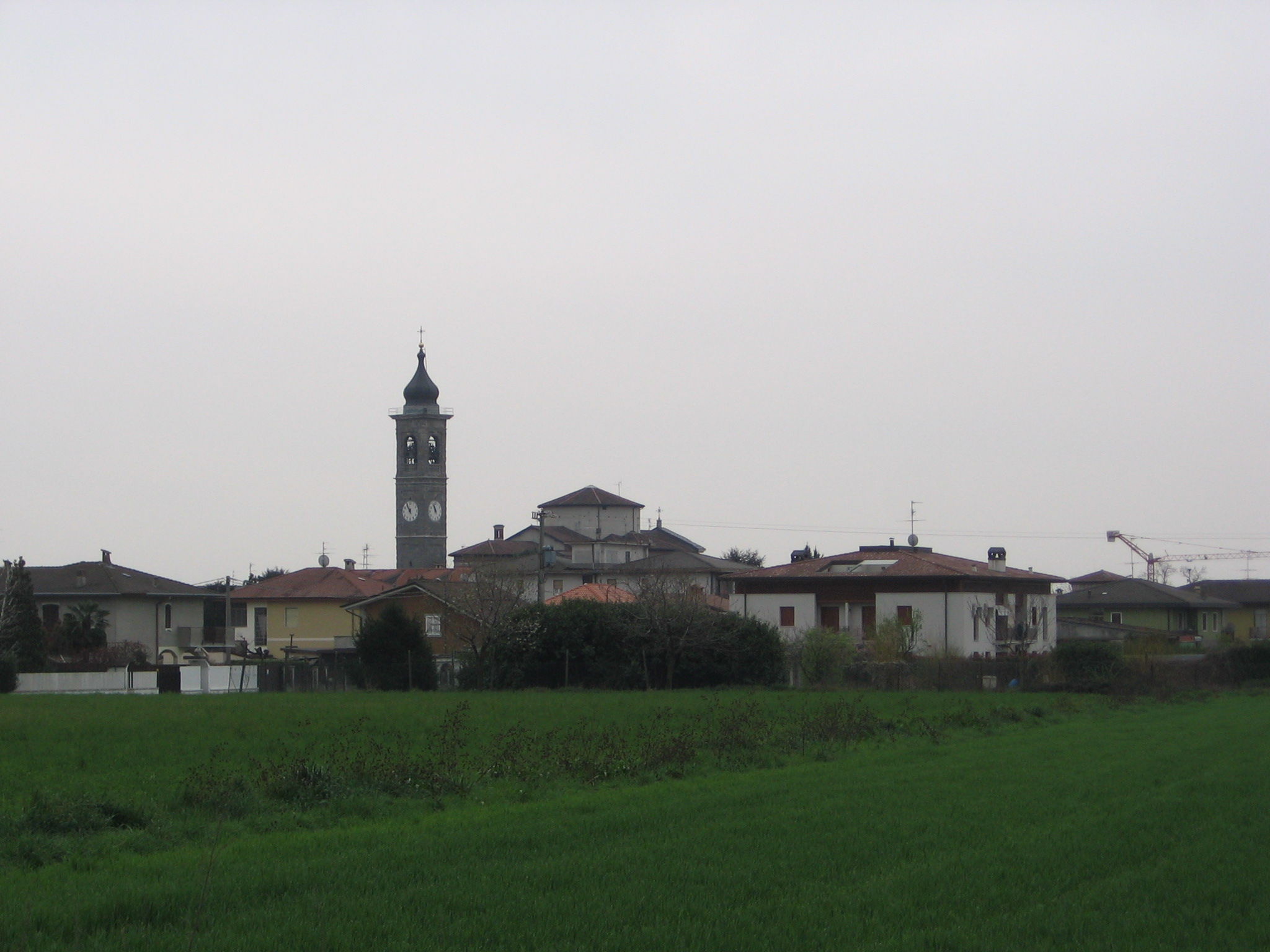
- Mornico al Serio

- Location within Italy Location within Lombardy
- Coordinates: 45°37′N 9°48′E
- Country: Italy
- Region: Lombardy
- Province: Province of Bergamo (BG)

Area
  - Total: 7.0 km^{2} (2.7 sq mi)
- Elevation: 162 m (531 ft)

Population (Dec. 2004)
  - Total: 2,632
  - Density: 380/km^{2} (970/sq mi)
- Demonym: Mornicesi
- Time zone: UTC+1 (CET)
  - Summer (DST): UTC+2 (CEST)
- Postal code: 24050
- Dialing code: 035

Mornico al Serio (Bergamasque: Mürnìch) is a comune (municipality) in the Province of Bergamo in the Italian region of Lombardy, located about 50 kilometres (31 mi) northeast of Milan and about 14 kilometres (9 mi) southeast of Bergamo. As of 31 December 2004, it had a population of 2,632 and an area of 7.0 square kilometres (2.7 mi^{2}).

Mornico al Serio borders the following municipalities: Calcinate, Ghisalba, Martinengo, Palosco.

== Demographic evolution ==
Historical population

| Year | Pop. | ±% |
|---|---|---|
| 1861 | 1,496 | — |
| 1871 | 1,686 | +12.7% |
| 1881 | 1,810 | +7.4% |
| 1901 | 1,852 | +2.3% |
| 1911 | 1,874 | +1.2% |

| Year | Pop. | ±% |
|---|---|---|
| 1921 | 1,882 | +0.4% |
| 1931 | 2,004 | +6.5% |
| 1936 | 1,870 | −6.7% |
| 1951 | 1,950 | +4.3% |
| 1961 | 1,910 | −2.1% |

| Year | Pop. | ±% |
|---|---|---|
| 1971 | 1,960 | +2.6% |
| 1981 | 2,237 | +14.1% |
| 1991 | 2,470 | +10.4% |
| 2001 | 2,588 | +4.8% |
| 2011 | 2,890 | +11.7% |

Source: Data from ISTAT
