= Palosco =

- Comune
- Comune di Palosco
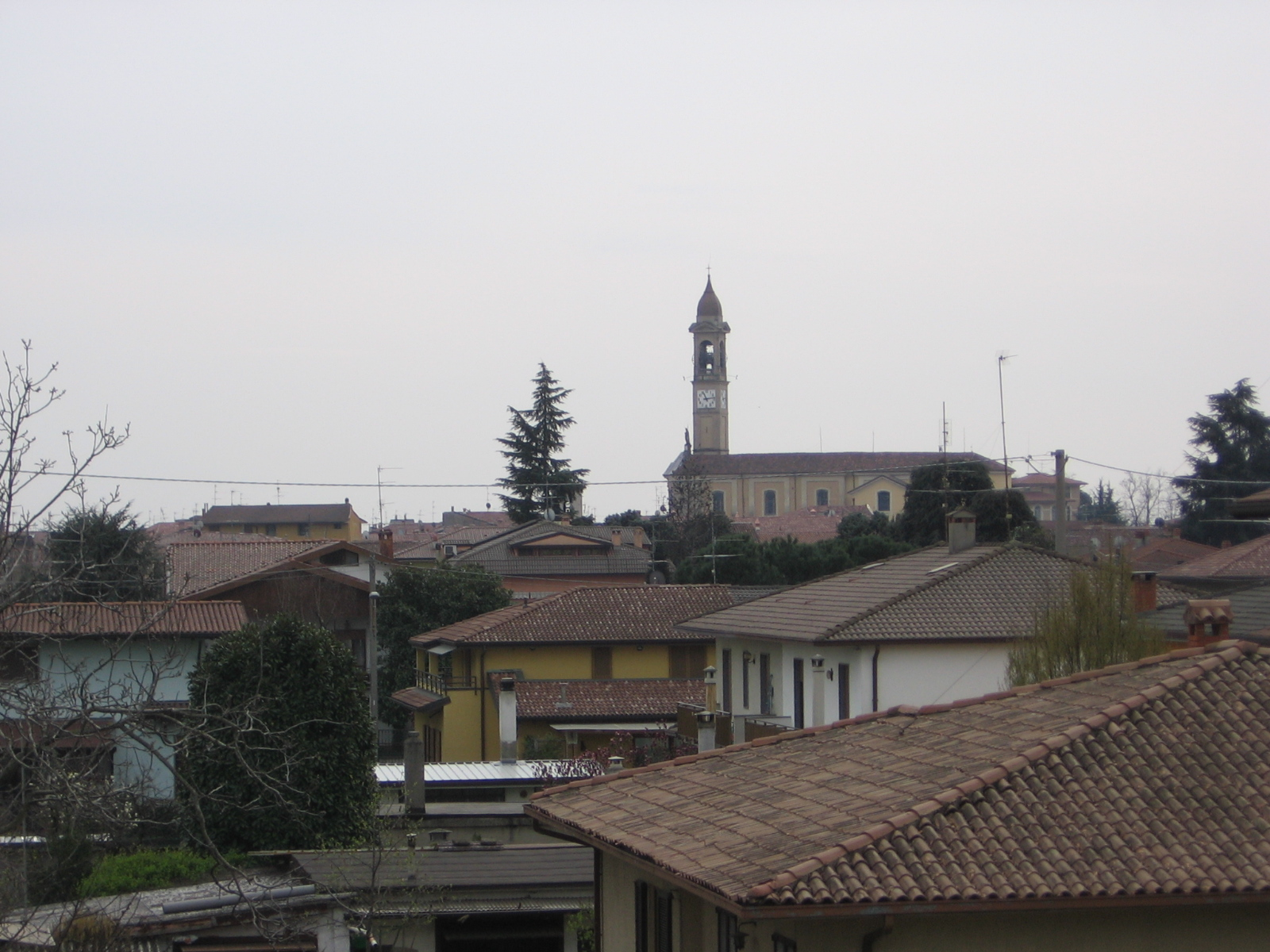
- Palosco

- Location within Italy Location within Lombardy
- Coordinates: 45°35′N 9°50′E
- Country: Italy
- Region: Lombardy
- Province: Province of Bergamo (BG)

Area
  - Total: 10.4 km^{2} (4.0 sq mi)
- Elevation: 157 m (515 ft)

Population (Dec. 2004)
  - Total: 5,353
  - Density: 515/km^{2} (1,330/sq mi)
- Demonym: Paloschesi
- Time zone: UTC+1 (CET)
  - Summer (DST): UTC+2 (CEST)
- Postal code: 24050
- Dialing code: 035

Palosco (Bergamasque: Palósch) is a comune (municipality) in the Province of Bergamo in the Italian region of Lombardy, located about 50 kilometres (31 mi) east of Milan and about 20 kilometres (12 mi) southeast of Bergamo. As of 31 December 2004, it had a population of 5,353 and an area of 10.4 square kilometres (4.0 mi^{2}).

Palosco borders the following municipalities: Bolgare, Calcinate, Cividate al Piano, Martinengo, Mornico al Serio, Palazzolo sull'Oglio, Pontoglio, Telgate.

The surnames Paloschi y Palloschi are believed to be toponyms for Palosco (Palösch in dialetto bergamasco

== Demographic evolution ==
Historical population

Year	Pop.	±%
1861	1,705	—
1871	1,834	+7.6%
1881	1,877	+2.3%
1901	2,131	+13.5%
1911	2,495	+17.1%

Year	Pop.	±%
1921	2,743	+9.9%
1931	2,972	+8.3%
1936	2,909	−2.1%
1951	3,470	+19.3%
1961	3,853	+11.0%

Year	Pop.	±%
1971	4,277	+11.0%
1981	4,643	+8.6%
1991	4,804	+3.5%
2001	4,999	+4.1%

Source: Data from ISTAT

== Notable people from Palosco ==
- Giovanni Gasparini (born 1908), football player
