= Nuova Ternana 1925 =

Italian football club

Ternana
- Full name: Ternana Calcio S.p.A.
- Nicknames: I Rossoverdi (The Red and Greens); Le Fere ("The Beasts" in Umbrian)
- Founded: October 2, 1925; 101 years ago 2026; 0 years ago (refounded)
- Ground: Stadio Libero Liberati
- Capacity: 22,000
- Owner: N21Holding
- Chairman: Claudia Rizzo
- Manager: Andrea Lisuzzo
- League: Serie C Group B
- 2025–26: Serie C Group B, 9th of 20
- Website: ternanacalcio.com
Home colours	Away colours	Third colours

Ternana Calcio, commonly referred to as Ternana, is an Italian football club based in Terni, Umbria. They were founded in 1925 and were refounded in 2026, competed in Serie C, and won Serie B in the 1971-72 season.

The club was founded in 1925 and refounded in 1993. In its history, Ternana has twice played in Serie A (in the 1972–73 and 1974–75 seasons) and 28 times in Serie B.

The first team from Umbria to reach Serie A, Ternana enjoys a local rivalry with Perugia. Ternana plays its home matches at the Stadio Libero Liberati.

== History ==
=== Foundation ===
The club was founded in 1925 as Terni F.B.C after the merger between Terni Football Club and Unione Sportiva Ternana, reaching the II Division in 1926 and the I Division (nowadays known as Serie B) just a year later.

=== From Serie C to Serie B ===
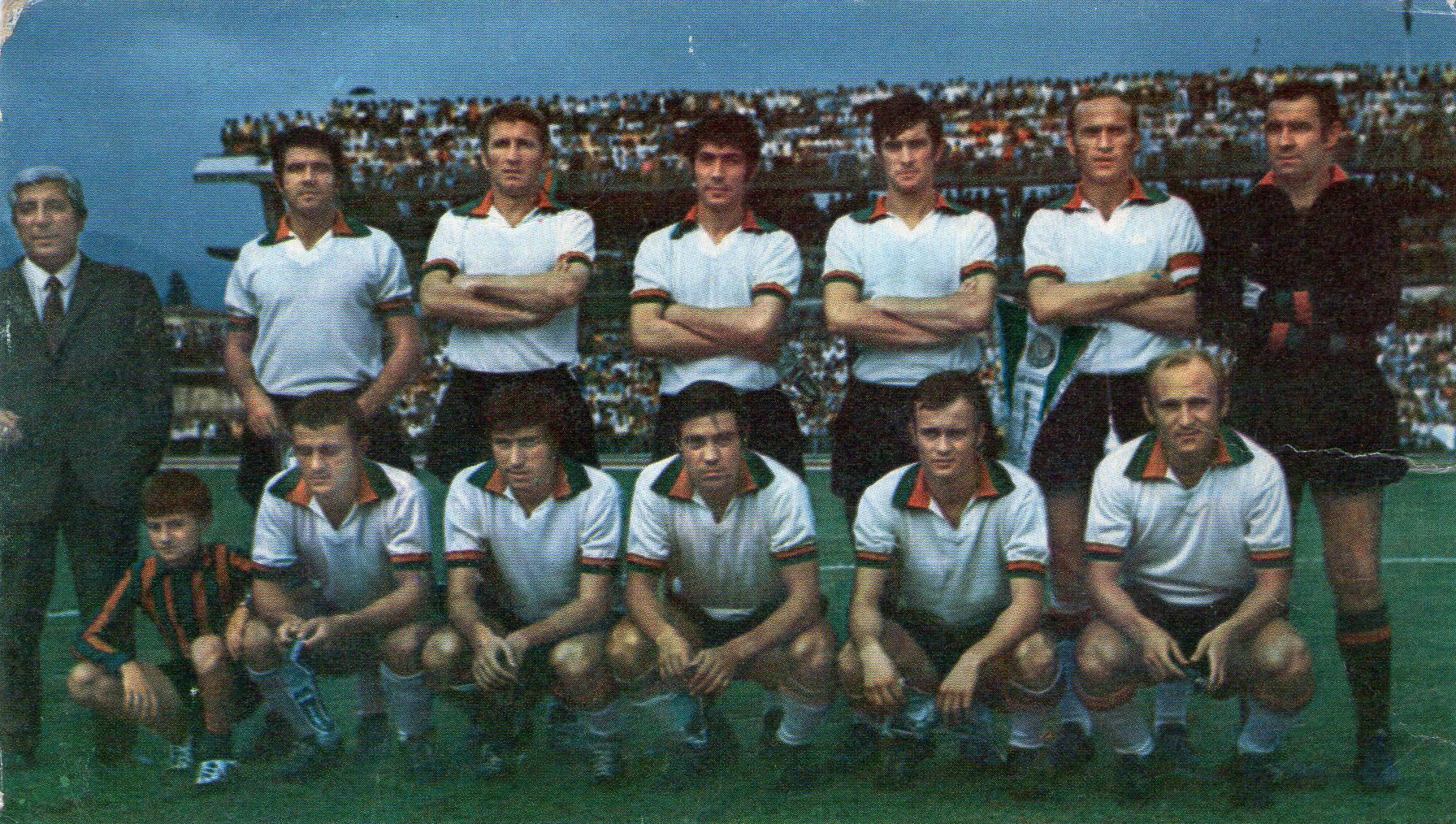
1969–70 Ternana

The club, however, folded in due to financial difficulties, being refounded in 1929 as Unione Fascista Ternana (a denomination that was common during the Italian fascist regime). Folding again in 1933, the club returned to footballing action in 1935 under the name Polisportiva Mario Umberto Borzacchini, after a racing car driver and a native of Terni who had died at the 1933 Monza Grand Prix. In 1938 the new club reached promotion to Serie C, missing a second consecutive promotion the following year.

In 1946, after the World War II, football restarted in Italy and Ternana played in the Serie B, missing promotion for two consecutive years, and being relegated to Serie C in 1949 and IV Serie in 1950. A third relegation, this time to Promozione, came in 1953, and was followed by two years in the regional division for Ternana before returning to IV Serie in 1955. The club returned to Serie C in 1964, and Serie B in 1968, the latter under coach Corrado Viciani.

=== 1970s–1993: From Serie A to bankruptcy ===
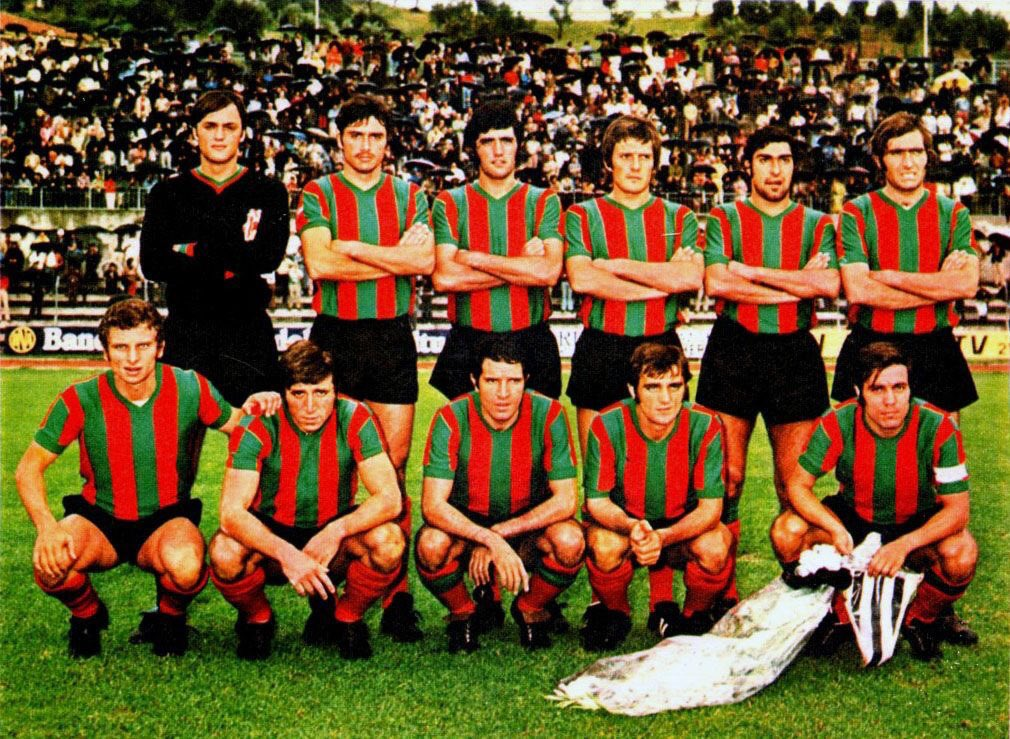
1972–73 Ternana, at its first Serie A season.

In 1972, Ternana finally won Serie B and reached Serie A for their first time, again with Viciani as coach. However, the club did not prove to be ready for Serie A, as they were promptly relegated in their debut appearance in the top flight, managing only three wins in 30 matches. In 1974, again in Serie B, Ternana managed to reach one of the three top spots, winning their second promotion to Serie A; this was, however, followed by yet another sad relegation. In the following years, despite a number of noted head coaches such as Edmondo Fabbri, Cesare Maldini and Renzo Ulivieri, Ternana did not manage to return in the top flight, and instead were relegated to Serie C in 1980, despite a prestigious run in the 1979–80 Coppa Italia, where Ternana reached the semi-finals, being then eliminated 3–1 on aggregate by Roma.

During the 1980s Ternana played between Serie C1 and Serie C2, before going bankrupt on 12 December 1987. Managed by an official liquidator, Ternana ended the season and escaped relegation. The club, bought in the summer of 1988 by a consortium headed by Gaspare Gambino, won promotion to Serie C in 1988–89 after winning the penalty shootout in a playoff against Chieti. Successively, Ternana won Serie C1 in 1992 and marked their return to Serie B. The promotion was, however, followed by financial troubles that prevented new signings. At the end of the season, which the team finished in the last position, Ternana went officially bankrupt.

=== 1993–1998: From the refoundation to Serie B ===
On the summer 1993 the club was refounded as Ternana Calcio and was being forced to begin again from Serie D. In their first Serie D campaign, Ternana missed promotion, ending in third place behind Teramo and local rivals Narnese. This was followed by another unsuccessful attempt, as Ternana lost promotion to Viterbese; despite this, the club was later readmitted to Serie C2 to fill a league vacancy (ripescaggio). In 1996–97 and 1997–98, with a new president and Luigi Delneri as head coach, Ternana won two consecutive promotions, thus returning to Serie B.

=== 1998–present: From Serie B to Lega Pro Prima Divisione and back ===
Ternana played Serie B from 1998 until 2006. In 2004 missed a promotion in Serie A finishing 4 points behind Fiorentina.

In 2006 they were relegated to Serie C1 (since the season 2008–09 Lega Pro Prima Divisione).

In the season 2010–11 the club was relegated to Lega Pro Seconda Divisione after losing the play-out, but it was later readmitted to Lega Pro Prima Divisione on 4 August 2011 to fill vacancies.

In the following season 2011–12 it was promoted from Lega Pro Prima Divisione to Serie B.

Back in Serie B, Ternana has avoided relegation as well as play-outs for 6 consecutive seasons.

In June 2017, the ownership of the club passed to Stefano Bandecchi (owner of the Università degli Studi Niccolò Cusano). When the club was bought by Unicusano, thus adding the name of the private university to the club. The word "Unicusano" was also added to the crest in 2017–18 season, but was removed in May 2018.

Ternana was relegated from Serie B on 12 May 2018 and returned to Serie B after a three-year purgatory. In their last season in Serie C, Ternana dominated the (Southern) group C, finishing 22 points ahead Catanzaro.

On 28 May 2026 the club was officially liquidated. Following the bankruptcy, a phoenix club was established under the name Nuova Ternana 1925, created through the merger of Orvietana (whose sporting title was acquired by mayor and former Ternana president Stefano Bandecchi) and Ternana Tip Power Futsal. The new club was admitted to Serie D for the 2026–27 season and plays its home matches at the Stadio Libero Liberati.

== Colors and badge ==
The team's colours are red and green. It is the only Italian professional team with a red and green combination.

== Supporters ==
The ultra supporters of Ternana Calcio are called "The Freak Brothers". They are linked with the political left.

== Squad ==
=== Current squad ===
As of 27 July 2026

Note: Flags indicate national team as defined under FIFA eligibility rules; some limited exceptions apply. Players may hold more than one non-FIFA nationality.

No.	Pos.	Nation	Player
32	FW	ITA	Stefano Pettinari
38	MF	ITA	Tiberio Bruti
—	GK	ITA	Filippo Novelli
—	DF	ITA	Giulio Biondini
—	DF	ITA	Matteo Comozzi Mais

No.	Pos.	Nation	Player
—	DF	ITA	Alberto Di Gaetani
—	MF	ITA	Tommaso Barbini
—	MF	ITA	Simone Curzi
—	MF	ITA	Ermanno Pepe
—	FW	ITA	Lorenzo Liurni

== Managers ==
- Karl Harmer (1930)
- Guido Gianfardoni (1939–41)
- Enrico Colombari (1941–42)
- Oreste Cioni (1952–54), (1960–61), (1965–66)
- Umberto Pinardi (1969–70)
- Luís Vinício (1970–71)
- Cesare Maldini (1976–77)
- Renzo Ulivieri (1978–79)
- Gian Piero Ghio (1980–81)
- Lauro Toneatto (1985–86)
- Mario Facco (1986–88)
- Claudio Tobia (1988–90)
- Angelo Orazi (1990–91)
- Roberto Clagluna (1991–92)
- Franco Liguori (1992–93)
- Claudio Tobia (1993–94)
- Leonardo Acori (1994–95)
- Massimo Silva (1995–96)
- Luciano Spinosi (1996)
- Luigi Delneri (1996–98)
- Antonello Cuccureddu (1998)
- Luigi Delneri (1998–99)
- Vincenzo Guerini (1998–00)
- Tarcisio Burgnich (1999–00)
- Andrea Agostinelli (2000–01)
- Bruno Bolchi (2001–02)
- Mario Beretta (2002–04)
- Bruno Bolchi (2004)
- Corrado Verdelli (2004)
- Giovanni Vavassori (2004)
- Domenico Caso (2005–06)
- Renzo Gobbo (2010)
- Fernando Orsi (2010–11)
- Bruno Giordano (2011)
- Domenico Toscano (2011–13)
- Attilio Tesser (2013–15)
- Domenico Toscano (2015)
- Roberto Breda (2015–2016)
- Cristian Panucci (2016)
- Benito Carbone (2016–2017)
- Carmine Gautieri (2017)
- Fabio Liverani (2017)
- Sandro Pochesci (2017–2018)
- Ferruccio Mariani (2018)
- Luigi De Canio (2018–2019)
- Alessandro Calori (2019)
- Fabio Gallo (2019–2020)
- Cristiano Lucarelli (2020–present)

== Honours ==
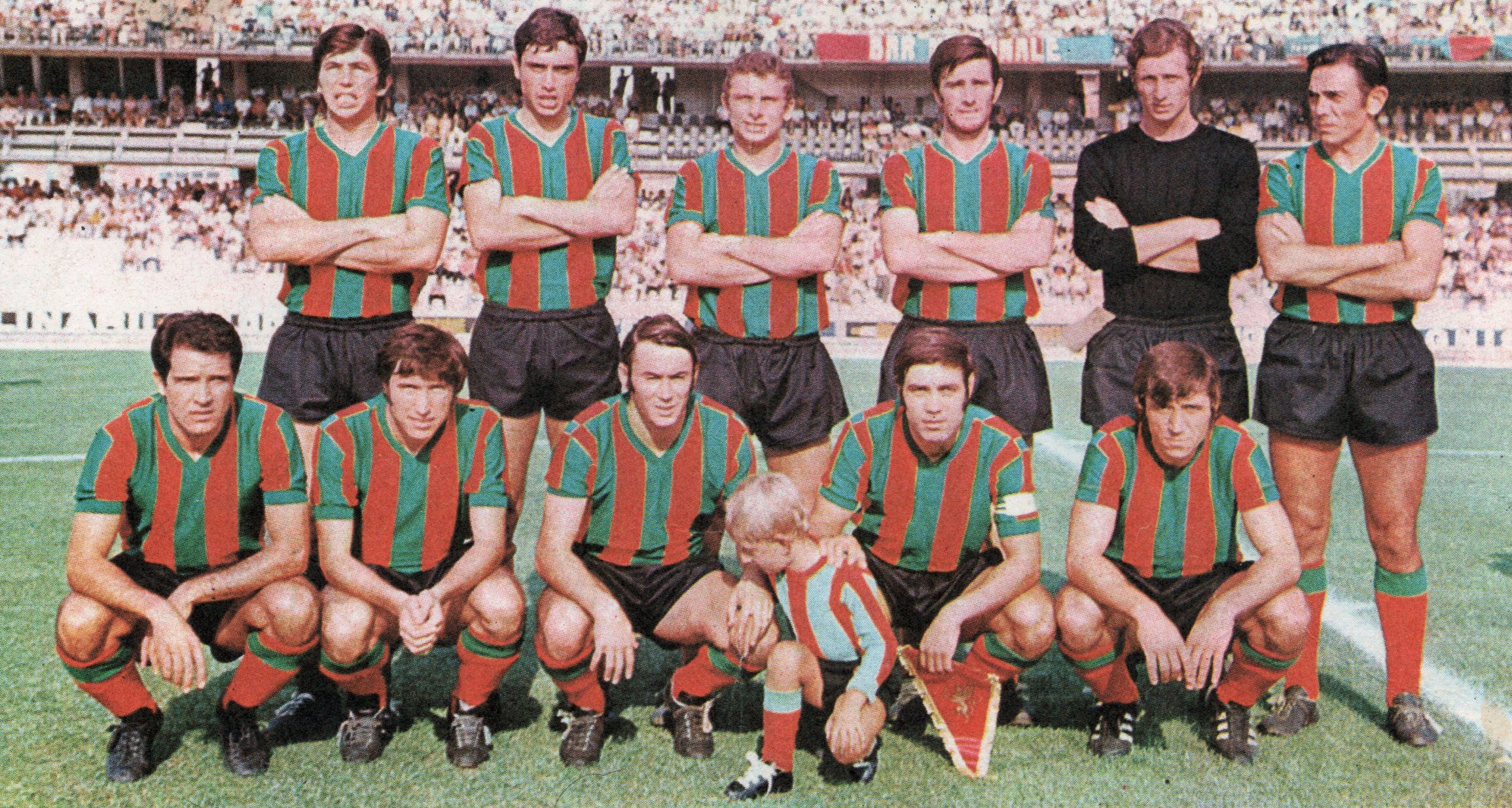
Ternana's 1971–72 Serie B winning squad

- Serie B
  - Winners: 1971–72
- Serie C1
  - Winners: 1967–68, 1991–92, 2011–12, 2020–21
- Serie C2
  - Winners: 1996–97
- Supercoppa di Serie C
  - Winners: 2021

== Bibliography ==
- Armadori, Giorgio; Christian Armadori (2001). Tra storia e leggenda, almanacco illustrato della Ternana dalle origini al 2000 (in Italian). Ternana Calcio. ISBN 88-434-0859-3.
