= Giuseppe Prisco =

Italian lawyer and football chairman (1921–2001)

- Born: 10 December 1921; Milan, Kingdom of Italy
- Died: 12 December 2001 (aged 80); Milan, Italy
- Occupations: Lawyer and sporting director
- Known for: Former vice-chairman of Inter Milan

Giuseppe "Peppino" Prisco (10 December 1921 – 12 December 2001) was an Italian lawyer and sporting director, known for being the vice-chairman of Inter Milan from 1963 until his death.

== Life and career ==
Prisco was born in Milan on 10 December 1921. At the age of 18, he joined the Italian participation in the Eastern Front as lieutenant of the 9th Alpini Regiment. He was awarded a Silver Medal of Military Valor for distinguishing himself in combat. He graduated in law in 1944 and became a layer in 1946. In 1948, he married Maria Irene De Vecchi, with which he had two children.

He died from a heart attack on 12 December 2001.

== Vice-chairman of Inter Milan ==
The Bussolas, close family friends whom Prisco regarded as an aunt and uncle, helped spark his lifelong support for Inter by bringing some cakes to celebrate the club’s 1929–30 victory in the Milan derby. He quickly climbed the hierarchy of the club, becoming an associate member in 1946, secretary in 1949, advisor in 1950, and vice-chairman on 23 July 1963 until his death.

During his time at the club, Inter won six Serie A A titles, two Coppa Italia, one Supercoppa Italiana, two European Cups, two Intercontinental Cups and three UEFA Cups.

In 2001, he was posthumously awarded the Pirata d'Oro, an award usually given to the best Inter player of the previous season. In 2005, the town of Arcisate dedicated the local football stadium to his memory.

In 2021, he was inducted into Inter Milan Hall of Fame.
