= Valentino Degani =

Italian footballer

Personal information
- Date of birth: 14 February 1905
- Place of birth: Badia Polesine, Italy
- Date of death: 8 November 1974 (aged 69)
- Place of death: Bollate, Italy
- Height: 1.69 m (5 ft 6 1/2 in)
- Position: Goalkeeper

Senior career*
Years	Team	Apps	(Gls)
1924–1925	Internazionale	6	(0)
1925–1926	Treviso	10	(0)
1926–1938	Ambrosiana-Inter	160	(0)
1938–1940	Biellese	40	(0)

International career
1929	Italy B	2	(0)

Managerial career
- 1942–1943: Falck
Medal record
Representing Italy
Summer Olympics
Bronze medal – third place	Summer Olympics	1928 Amsterdam
- * Club domestic league appearances and goals

Valentino Degani (14 February 1905 – 8 November 1974) was an Italian footballer who played in the role of goalkeeper.

== Club career ==
Degani was born in Badia Polesine, province of Rovigo. He played 176 matches in Serie A Inter Milan from 1924 to 1937, winning one league title during the 1929–30 season.

== International career ==
With the Italy national football team, Degani won a bronze medal at the 1928 Summer Olympics, although did not feature in a match.

== Honours ==
=== International ===
Italy

- Olympic Bronze Medal: 1928
