= Armando Castellazzi =

Italian footballer (1904–1968)

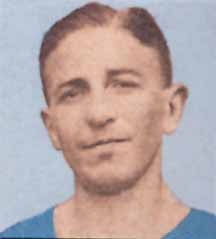
- Armando Castellazzi

Personal information
- Full name: Armando Castellazzi
- Date of birth: 7 October 1904
- Place of birth: Milan, Kingdom of Italy
- Date of death: 4 January 1968 (aged 63)
- Place of death: Milan, Italy
- Height: 1.84 m (6 ft 0 in)
- Position: Midfielder

Senior career*
Years	Team	Apps	(Gls)
1924–1936	Ambrosiana-Inter	261	(16)

International career
1929–1934	Italy	3	(0)

Managerial career
- 1936–1938: Ambrosiana-Inter
Medal record
Italy
FIFA World Cup
Gold medal – first place	1934 Italy
- * Club domestic league appearances and goals

Armando Castellazzi (Italian pronunciation: [arˈmando kastelˈlattsi]; 7 October 1904 – 4 January 1968) was an Italian professional footballer and manager who played as a midfielder.

== Club career ==
Born in Milan, Castellazzi spent his entire club career in the 1920s and 1930s playing for Ambrosiana-Inter in Serie A. He played 261 match in all competitions for the team, scoring 16 goals, helping the club to win the 1929–30 Serie A championship. His club debut came on 6 October 1929, in a 2–1 away win over Livorno.

== International career ==
With the Italy national team, Castellazzi made three appearances between 1929 and 1934; he made his international debut on 1 December 1929, in a 6–1 friendly home win over Portugal in Milan, and later appeared in a 4–2 friendly home win over Switzerland in Rome, on 9 February 1930. He also made one appearance – his final international cap – in the team's victorious 1934 FIFA World Cup campaign on home soil, starting in the first quarter-final against Spain, held in Florence, on 31 May, which ended in a 1–1 draw.

== Managerial career ==
After retiring from football at the age of 32, Castellazzi remained with the Ambrosiana-Inter organization where in 1938 he became the youngest person in the history of Serie A to win the championship as a coach.

== Career statistics ==
=== International ===
Appearances and goals by national team and year
National team	Year	Apps	Goals
Italy	1929	1	0
Italy	1930	1	0
Italy	1934	1	0
Total		3	0

== Honours ==
=== Player ===
==== Club ====
Ambrosiana-Inter

- Serie A: 1929–30

==== International ====
Italy

- FIFA World Cup: 1934

=== Coach ===
==== Club ====
Ambrosiana-Inter

- Serie A: 1937–38
