= Vincenzo Coppo =

Italian footballer

Personal information
- Date of birth: March 29, 1905
- Place of birth: Mirabello Monferrato, Italy
- Position: Defender

Senior career*
Years	Team	Apps	(Gls)
1923–1924	Internazionale	0	(0)
1924–1926	Libertas Firenze		
1926–1927	Atalanta	24	(0)
1927–1928	Internazionale	20	(0)
1928–1929	Prato	28	(0)
1929–1930	Ambrosiana-Inter	3	(0)
1930–1932	Vigevanesi		
1932–1933	Acireale	15	(0)
1933–1934	Reggina	19	(0)
1934–1935	Acqui		
- * Club domestic league appearances and goals

Vincenzo Coppo (born March 29, 1905, in Mirabello Monferrato) was an Italian professional football player.

== Honours ==
- Serie A champion: 1929/30
