= Hernst Marktl =

German footballer

Personal information
- Full name: Hernst Xavier Marktl
- Date of birth: 23 June 1887
- Place of birth: Ettringen, Germany
- Position: Defender

Senior career*
Years	Team	Apps	(Gls)
1909	Internazionale	2	(0)
- * Club domestic league appearances and goals

Hernst Marktl (23 June 1887 – ?) was a German footballer who played as a defender. Throughout his club career, he played for Italian side Internazionale, also serving as the team's captain.
