= Edmondo Della Valle =

Italian-Argentine footballer (1904–1976)

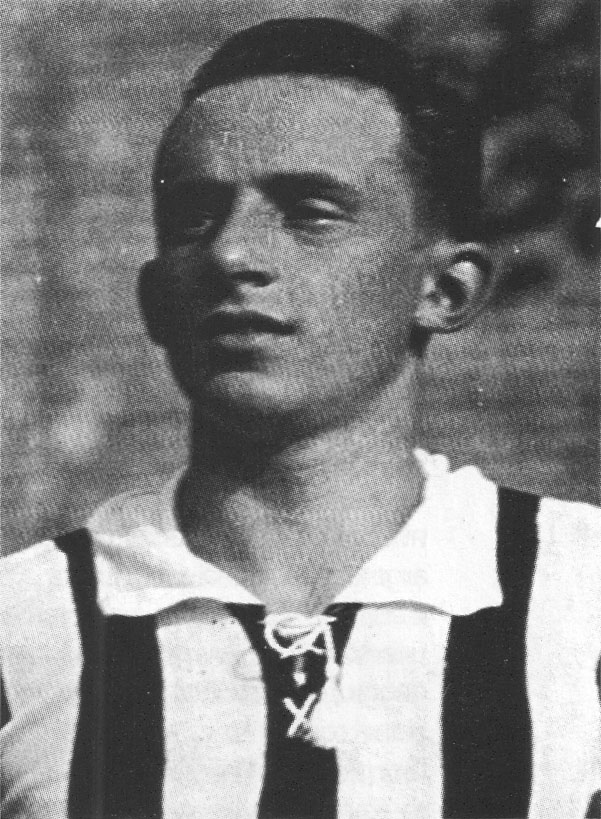
- Della Valle with Juventus

Personal information
- Place of birth: Arce, Italy
- Date of death: 1976
- Position: Midfielder

Senior career*
Years	Team	Apps	(Gls)
1925–1928	Foggia		
1928–1930	Juventus	15	(2)
1930–1931	Bari	23	(0)
1931–1932	Andrea Doria		
1932–1934	Nice	15	(0)
1934–1935	Cornigliano		
- * Club domestic league appearances and goals

Edmondo Della Valle (16 November 1904 – 1976) was an Italian professional football player. He was born in Arce, Italy. He also held Argentine citizenship.
