= Leopoldo Conti =

Italian footballer and coach

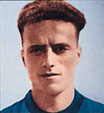

Personal information
- Date of birth: 12 April 1901
- Place of birth: Milan, Italy
- Date of death: 14 January 1970 (aged 68)
- Place of death: Milan, Italy
- Position: Forward

Senior career*
Years	Team	Apps	(Gls)
1917–1918	Enotria Goliardo		
1918–1920	Internazionale	30	(10)
1920–1921	Padova	15	(6)
1921–1931	Internazionale	206	(66)
1931–1933	Pro Patria	37	(3)

International career
1920–1929	Italy	31	(8)

Managerial career
- 1934–1935: Lecco
- 1936–1937: Lecco
Medal record
Italy
Central European International Cup
Gold medal – first place	1927–30 Central European International Cup
- * Club domestic league appearances and goals

Leopoldo Conti (Italian pronunciation: [leoˈpɔldo ˈkonti]; 12 April 1901 – 14 January 1970) was an Italian professional football player and coach, who played as a striker or winger.

== Club career ==
At club level, Conti played for several Italian clubs, in particular Ambrosiana Inter (as they were known at the time), with whom he had two spells (1918–20; 1921–31), winning two league titles, in 1920 and 1930, and scoring a total of 76 league goals in 236 league appearances; he also served as the team's captain between 1922 and 1931. He also played for Enotria Goliardo (1917–18), Padova (1920–21), and Pro Patria (1931–33). He made his professional debut in the Italian top flight on 3 November 1929, with A. Inter, in a 3–2 home win over Cremonese.

== International career ==
At international level, Conti obtained 31 appearances for Italy between 1920 and 1929, scoring 8 goals. He made his international debut on 28 March 1920, starting in a 3–0 friendly away loss to Switzerland, at the age of 18 years, 351 days. Conti is either the second or third-youngest player ever to start a match for Italy, behind only Eugenio Mosso, and possibly Rodolfo Gavinelli. Mosso made his only international appearance for Italy on 5 April 1914, starting in a 1–1 friendly away draw against Switzerland, at the age of 18 years, 238 days. Gavinelli, on the other hand, made his only international appearance for Italy on 9 April 1911, starting in a 2–2 friendly away draw against France, at the age of either 20 years, 98 days, or 16 years, 98 days, as it is not known officially whether he was born on 1 January in 1891 or 1895. Conti later took part at the 1924 Summer Olympics with the Italy national football team. He was also a part of the squad that won the 1927–30 Central European International Cup.

== Coaching career ==
Following his retirement from professional football, Conti also served as a coach with Lecco from 1934 to 1937.

== Honours ==
=== Club ===
Inter

- Italian Football Championship: 1919–20
- Serie A: 1929–30

=== International ===
Italy

- Central European International Cup: 1927–30
