= Giovanni Gasparini =

Italian footballer (born 1908)

Personal information
- Date of birth: February 20, 1908
- Place of birth: Palosco, Italy
- Height: 1.73 m (5 ft 8 in)
- Position: Midfielder

Senior career*
Years	Team	Apps	(Gls)
1926–1928	Atalanta	38	(?)
1928–1929	Verona	30	(0)
1929–1930	Ambrosiana-Inter	2	(0)
1930–1939	Brescia	172	(1)
1940–1941	Pro Palazzolo		
- * Club domestic league appearances and goals

Giovanni Gasparini (born February 20, 1908, in Palosco) was an Italian professional football player.

== Honours ==
- Serie A champion: 1929/30
