= Giulio Balestrini =

Italian footballer (1907–1997)

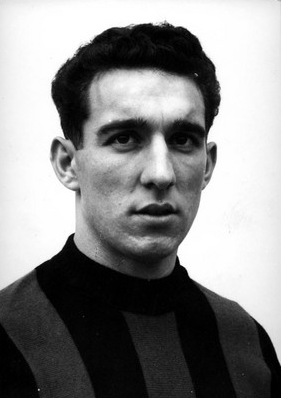
- Balestrini c. 1920s

Personal information
- Date of birth: July 19, 1907
- Place of birth: Saronno, Italy
- Date of death: May 5, 1997 (aged 89)
- Place of death: Milan, Italy
- Position: Midfielder

Senior career*
Years	Team	Apps	(Gls)
1925–1927	Saronno		
1927–1930	Ambrosiana-Inter	12	(2)
1930–1931	Lugano		
1931–1932	Saronno		
1932–1933	Roma	0	(0)
1933–1935	Saronno		
- * Club domestic league appearances and goals

Giulio Balestrini (19 July 1907 – May 5, 1997) was an Italian football player.

== Career ==
=== Player ===
He made his debut with Saronno in the Third Division and in 1927 he was bought by Inter where in his first season he made his debut in the top flight in the derby against Milan, on 10 November 1929. After the merger with US Milanese and the birth of Ambrosiana, he remained two seasons in the new team, collecting a total of 11 more appearances and 2 goals, crowned by the victory of the championship in 1929-1930.

After this experience, there were those with Lugano, Roma, Saronno again and finally Monza

== Honours ==
- Serie A champion: 1929/30
