= Luigi Pedrazzini =

Italian footballer

Personal information
- Date of birth: July 20, 1909
- Place of birth: Milan, Italy
- Position: Midfielder

Senior career*
Years	Team	Apps	(Gls)
1927–1928	Atalanta	7	(0)
1928–1929	Cremonese	1	(0)
1929–1930	Ambrosiana-Inter	1	(0)
1930–1931	Desio		
1931–1933	Catanzaro		
1933–1934	Servette		
1934–1935	Chiasso		
- * Club domestic league appearances and goals

Luigi Pedrazzini (born July 20, 1909, in Milan) was an Italian professional football player.

== Honours ==
- Serie A champion: 1929/30
