= Mariano Tansini =

Italian footballer and manager

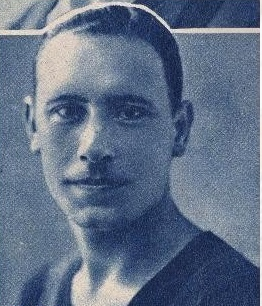

Personal information
- Full name: Mariano Tansini
- Date of birth: 10 August 1903
- Place of birth: Codogno, Italy
- Date of death: 15 June 1968 (aged 64)
- Place of death: Padua, Italy
- Position: Forward

Senior career*
Years	Team	Apps	(Gls)
1921–1922	Codogno	?	(?)
1922–1923	→ Cremonese (loan)	?	(0)
1923–1924	Piacenza	14	(4)
1924–1927	Cremonese	57	(10)
1927–1930	Milan	82	(18)
1930–1932	Napoli	54	(12)
1932–1933	Padova	32	(6)
1933–1934	Milan	13	(3)
1934–1935	Sampierdarenese	4	(1)

International career
1926	Italy	2	(0)
1929	Italy B	2	(1)

Managerial career
- 1934–1935: Fanfulla
- 1937–1938: Brescia Calcio
- 1939: Padova
- 1943–1946: Padova
- 1946–1947: Castelfranco Veneto
- 1949–1950: Inter
- 1951–1953: Piacenza
- 1953: Padova
- * Club domestic league appearances and goals

Mariano Tansini (Italian pronunciation: [maˈrjaːno tanˈsiːni]; 10 August 1903 – 15 June 1968) was an Italian association football manager and footballer who played as a forward. He played for the Italy national football team twice, the first being on 21 March 1926, the occasion of a friendly match against Ireland in a 3–0 home win.
