= Galio, Liberia =

Galio
- Location in Liberia
- Coordinates: 5°46′24″N 7°32′59″W
- Country: Liberia
- County: Grand Gedeh County

Galio is a town in Grand Gedeh County in Liberia, near the border of Ivory Coast.
