= Silvio Pietroboni =

Italian footballer

Personal information
- Date of birth: 9 April 1904
- Place of birth: Milan, Kingdom of Italy
- Date of death: 18 February 1987 (aged 82)
- Place of death: Milan, Italy
- Position: Midfielder

Senior career*
Years	Team	Apps	(Gls)
1919–1933	Internazionale	194	(9)
1920–1921	→ Lecco (loan)	20	(0)
1933–1934	Gallaratese		

International career
1927–1929	Italy	11	(0)
Medal record
Representing Italy
Summer Olympics
Bronze medal – third place	1928 Amsterdam
Central European International Cup
Gold medal – first place	1927–30 Central European International Cup
- * Club domestic league appearances and goals

Silvio Pietroboni (Italian pronunciation: [ˈsilvjo ˌpjɛtroˈbɔːni]; 9 April 1904 – 18 February 1987) was an Italian association footballer who played as a midfielder. He competed in the 1928 Summer Olympics with the Italy national football team.

== International career ==
Pietroboni was a member of the Italy national team which won the bronze medal in the 1928 Olympic football tournament.

== Honours ==
=== Club ===
Inter

- Serie A champion: 1929–30

=== International ===
Italy

- Central European International Cup: 1927–30
- Summer Olympics: Bronze Medal 1928
