= Giovanni Bolzoni (footballer, born 1905) =

Italian footballer (born 1905)

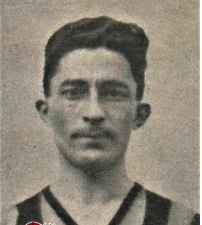

Personal information
- Date of birth: 27 November 1905
- Place of birth: Milan, Kingdom of Italy
- Position: Defender

Senior career*
Years	Team	Apps	(Gls)
1924–1925	Milan	1	(0)
1925–1926	Parma	20	(1)
1926–1927	Milan	4	(0)
1927–1928	Milanese	18	(0)
1928–1932	Ambrosiana-Inter	71	(0)
1932–1935	Pavia	55	(0)
1935–1939	Monza		
1939–1940	Cantù		
- * Club domestic league appearances and goals

Giovanni Bolzoni (born 27 November 1905) was an Italian professional football player born in Milan and a Serie A champion in 1929/30.
