= Antonio Blasevich =

Italian footballer and coach (1902-1976)

Personal information
- Date of birth: 18 August 1902
- Place of birth: Split, Kingdom of Dalmatia, Austria-Hungary
- Date of death: 1976 (aged 73–74)
- Place of death: Trieste, Italy
- Position: Midfielder

Senior career*
Years	Team	Apps	(Gls)
1919–1928	Triestina		
1928–1931	Ambrosiana-Inter	89	(30)
1931–1935	Palermo	121	(17)
1935–1936	Napoli	7	(0)

Managerial career
- 1950–1951: Padova
- * Club domestic league appearances and goals

Antonio Blasevich (18 August 1902 – 1976) was an Italian professional football player and coach.

== Honours ==
- Serie A champion: 1929/30.
