= Pietro Povero =

Italian footballer

Personal information
- Date of birth: 23 June 1899
- Place of birth: Vercelli, Kingdom of Italy
- Position: Outside right

Senior career*
Years	Team	Apps	(Gls)
1916–1917	Amatori Torino		
1919–1921	Alessandria		
1921–1923	Libertas Palermo		
1924–1925	SPAL	14	(1)
1925–1926	Reggiana	22	(6)
1926–1927	Modena	12	(2)
1927–1928	Milanese	18	(?)
1928–1929	Triestina	20	(7)
1929–1930	Ambrosiana-Inter	9	(2)
1930	Ascoli	11	(2)
1931–1933	Cavour Torino		
- * Club domestic league appearances and goals

Pietro Povero (born 23 June 1899) was an Italian professional footballer.

== Honours ==
- Serie A champion: 1929/30
