= Aldo Aimi =

Italian footballer (1906-1980)

Personal information
- Date of birth: 19 July 1906
- Place of birth: Modena, Italy
- Date of death: 1 January 1980 (aged 73)
- Place of death: Modena, Italy
- Position(s): Utility player

Senior career*
Years	Team	Apps	(Gls)
1925–1926	Parma	19	(2)
1926–1933	Modena	94	(12)
- *Club domestic league appearances and goals

Aldo Aimi (19 July 1906 – 1 January 1980) was an Italian football player, who operated in a variety positions in defence, midfield and even in goal. He was born in Modena, Italy. A tireless player, short of stature, Aimi possessed remarkable agility and speed married to his stamina.

== Career ==
Aimi started career his in 1925 with Parma, where he stayed for a year. He then moved on to hometown club Modena, where he stayed until his career's end in 1933. He made 67 appearances in Serie A in his career, all with Modena.
