= Enrico Rivolta =

Italian footballer (1905–1974)

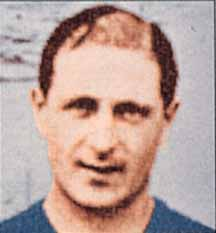

Personal information
- Date of birth: 29 June 1905
- Place of birth: Milan, Kingdom of Italy
- Date of death: 18 March 1974 (aged 68)
- Place of death: Milan, Italy
- Height: 1.63 m (5 ft 4 in)
- Position: Midfielder

Senior career*
Years	Team	Apps	(Gls)
1922–1933	Internazionale	265	(54)
1933–1936	Napoli	85	(2)
1936–1937	Milan	0	(0)
1937–1939	Crema		

International career
1928–1929	Italy	8	(1)
Medal record
Italy
Summer Olympics
Bronze medal – third place	1928 Amsterdam
Central European International Cup
Gold medal – first place	1927–30 Central European International Cup
- * Club domestic league appearances and goals

Enrico Rivolta (Italian pronunciation: [enˈriːko riˈvɔlta]; 29 June 1905 – 18 March 1974) was an Italian association footballer who played as a midfielder. He competed in the 1928 Summer Olympics with the Italy national football team. as well as played one match for the successful 1927-30 Central European International Cup squad.

== International career ==
Rivolta was a member of the Italy national team which won the bronze medal in the 1928 Olympic football tournament and due to his single match also the team that won the gold medal in the 1927–30 Central European International Cup.

== Honours ==
=== Club ===
Inter

- Serie A: 1929–30

=== International ===
Italy

- Central European International Cup: 1927–30
- Summer Olympics: Bronze 1928
