= Stefano Gallio =

Italian footballer

Personal information
- Date of birth: 16 May 1908
- Place of birth: Marostica, Italy
- Position: Defender

Senior career*
Years	Team	Apps	(Gls)
1925–1926	Marostica		
1926–1927	Stelvio Olona Milano		
1927–1928	Milanese	17	(0)
1928–1931	Ambrosiana-Inter	1	(0)
- * Club domestic league appearances and goals

Stefano Gallio (born 16 May 1908 in Marostica) was an Italian professional football player.

== Honours ==
- Serie A champion: 1929/30
