= Guido Gianfardoni =

Italian footballer and manager

Personal information
- Date of birth: 25 February 1901
- Place of birth: La Spezia, Italy
- Date of death: 26 April 1941 (aged 40)
- Position: Defender

Senior career*
Years	Team	Apps	(Gls)
1921–1922	Novara	21	(0)
1922–1926	Juventus	57	(4)
1926–1931	Ambrosiana-Inter	124	(1)
1931–1932	Lecce	27	(2)
1932–1933	Ambrosiana-Inter	2	(0)
1933–1934	Cremonese	3	(0)

Managerial career
- 1935–1938: Spezia
- 1939–1941: Ternana
- * Club domestic league appearances and goals

Guido Gianfardoni (25 February 1901 – 26 April 1941) was an Italian professional football player and coach.

== Honours ==
- Italian Football Championship champion: 1925/26
- Serie A champion: 1929/30
