= Umberto Visentin =

Italian footballer and manager

Personal information
- Date of birth: December 24, 1909
- Place of birth: Treviso, Italy
- Date of death: July 27, 1994 (aged 84)
- Position: Midfielder

Senior career*
Years	Team	Apps	(Gls)
1924–1928	Treviso	66	(21)
1928–1933	Ambrosiana-Inter	118	(27)
1933–1935	Napoli	27	(2)
1935–1936	Lazio	12	(2)
1936–1941	Treviso	82	(25)
1948–1949	Treviso	1	(0)

Managerial career
- 1948–1949: Treviso
- * Club domestic league appearances and goals

Umberto Visentin (December 24, 1909 in Treviso – July 27, 1994) was an Italian professional football player and coach.

His older brothers Giuseppe Visentin and Gino Visentin played football professionally, mostly for Treviso. To distinguish them, Giuseppe was known as Visentin I, Gino as Visentin II and Umberto as Visentin III.

== Honours ==
- Serie A champion: 1929/30
