= Calcio 2000 =

Monthly football magazine in Italy

- 38th edition (February 2001)
- Editor: Fabrizio Ponciroli
- Categories: Football
- Frequency: Monthly
- Founded: 1997
- First issue: August 1997
- Final issue: October 2020 (print)
- Country: Italy
- Based in: Brescia
- Language: Italian
- Website: calcio2000.it
- ISSN: 1126-1056

Calcio 2000 was a monthly Italian football magazine reporting on all aspects of Italian and European football. The magazine was published by Action Group Editore, and in October 2020 it became an online-only publication.

== History and profile ==
Calcio 2000 was first published in August 1997 as a monthly magazine. The founding editor-in-chief was Marino Bartoletti.

Written in Italian, it reports on football in Serie A, Serie B, Serie C1 and Serie C2. It also reports on how the other famous European teams are doing; and what happened in Premier League, La Liga, Bundesliga and Ligue 1. It also presents news on Italian teams in European competitions and there is sometimes special editions about clubs.
