= Pietro Serantoni =

Italian footballer & manager (1906–1964)

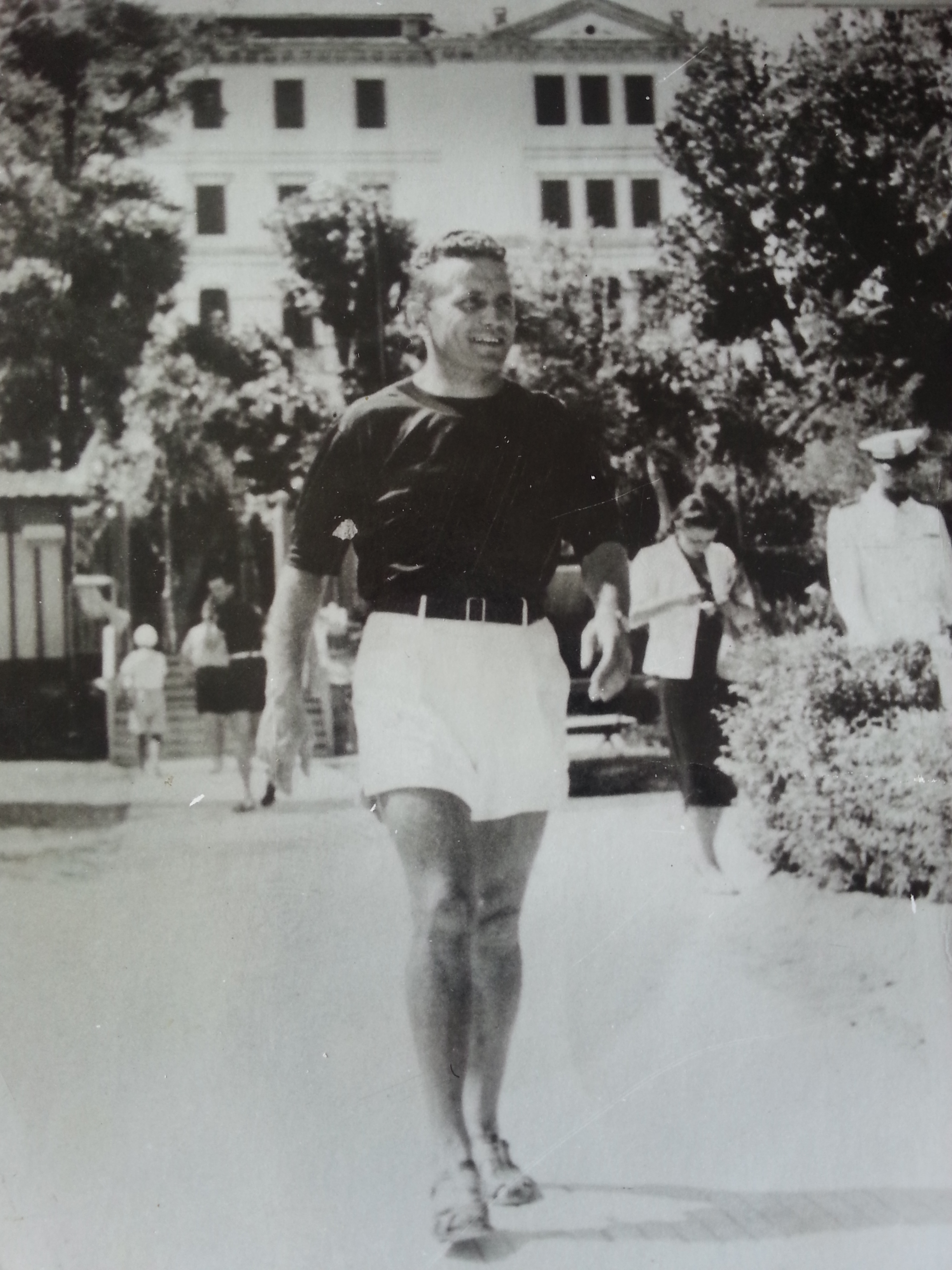

Personal information
- Full name: Pietro Serantoni
- Date of birth: 12 December 1906
- Place of birth: Venice, Kingdom of Italy
- Date of death: 6 October 1964 (aged 57)
- Place of death: Rome, Italy
- Height: 1.63 m (5 ft 4 in)
- Position: Midfielder

Senior career*
Years	Team	Apps	(Gls)
1925–1926	Ferrovieri Venezia		
1926–1927	Venezia	18	
1927–1928	Minerva Milano		
1928–1934	Ambrosiana-Inter	153	(55)
1934–1936	Juventus	35	(7)
1936–1940	Roma	73	(7)
1940–1944	Suzzara		
1946–1947	Padova	1	(0)

International career
1933–1939	Italy	17	(0)

Managerial career
- 1947–1949: Padova
- 1950: Padova
- 1950–1951: Roma
Medal record
Italy
Central European International Cup
Gold medal – first place	1933-35 Central European International Cup
FIFA World Cup
Gold medal – first place	1938 France
- * Club domestic league appearances and goals

Pietro Serantoni (Italian pronunciation: [ˈpjɛːtro seranˈtɔːni]; 12 December 1906 – 6 October 1964) was an Italian football midfielder and manager.

== Club career ==
Born in Venice, Serantoni played for Società Sprotiva Calcio Venezia, Internazionale (1928–1934), Juventus (1934–1936), A.S. Roma (1936–1940) and Suzzara.

He won two Italian titles, with Inter in 1930 (the club's first ever Serie A championship) and with Juventus in 1936.

== International career ==
Serantoni played 16 matches with the Italy national team, and they won the 1933–35 Central European International Cup, 1934 FIFA World Cup and the 1938 FIFA World Cup.

== Honours ==
=== Club ===
Inter-Ambrosiana

- Serie A: 1929–30

Juventus

- Serie A: 1934–35

=== International ===
Italy

- FIFA World Cup: 1938, 1934
- Central European International Cup: 1933–35
