= 1929–30 Serie A =

29th season of top-tier Italian football

Serie A
- Season: 1929–30
- Champions: Ambrosiana; 3rd title
- Relegated: Padova; Cremonese
- Matches: 306
- Goals: 969 (3.17 per match)
- Top goalscorer: Giuseppe Meazza (31 goals)

The 1929–30 Serie A was the thirtieth edition of the Italian Football Championship. It was also the seventh season from which the Italian Football Champions adorned their team jerseys in the subsequent season with a Scudetto. Replacing Divisione Nazionale, this was the first season of the Italian Football Championship after its landmark fourth re-brand that created Serie A. Serie A was the first Italian football nationwide round robin to decide Italy's champion club. Secondary division Serie B was created the same season, facilitating meritocratic promotion and relegation between two Italian nationwide divisions. Internazionale were inaugural Serie A winners, and thus were Italian national champions for the third time. This was their first win since the Scudetto started being awarded from 1924. At the time Inter were named Ambrosiana.

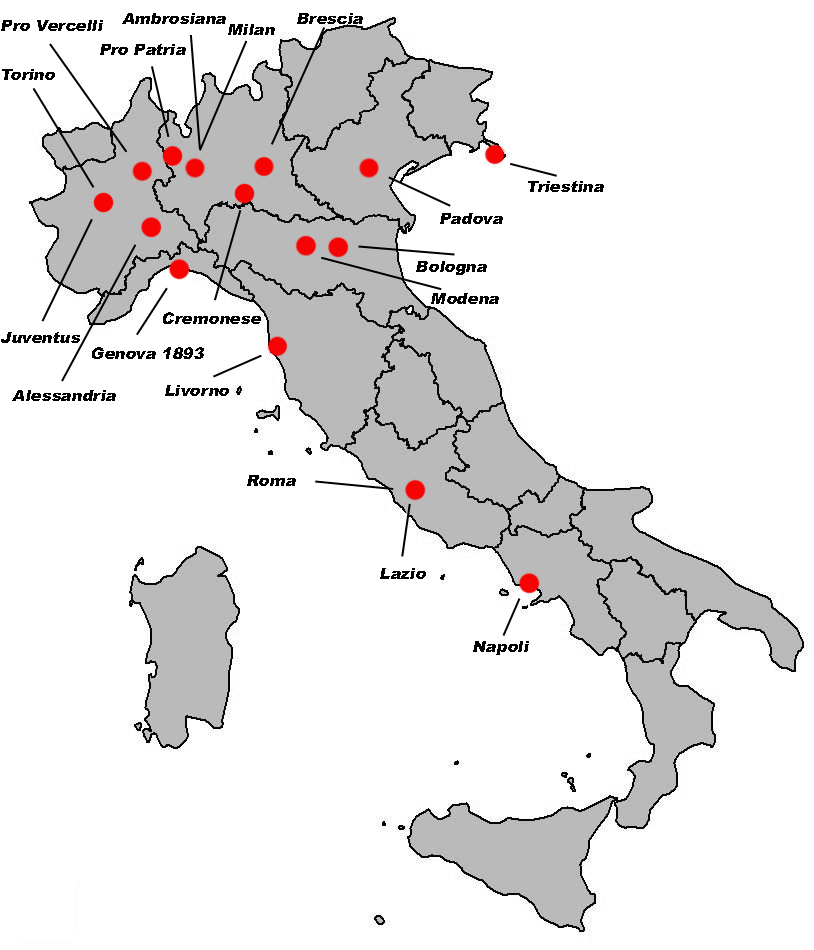
Serie A 1929-30 teams distribution

== Teams ==
The 18 clubs were the top 9 from each of the two groups in 1928–29 Divisione Nazionale.

== Final classification ==
Pos	Team	Pld	W	D	L	GF	GA	GD	Pts	Qualification or relegation
1	Ambrosiana (C)	34	22	6	6	85	38	+47	50	1930 Mitropa Cup
2	Genoa	34	20	8	6	63	36	+27	48	1930 Mitropa Cup
3	Juventus	34	19	7	8	56	31	+25	45	
4	Torino	34	16	7	11	52	31	+21	39	
5	Napoli	34	14	9	11	61	51	+10	37	
6	Roma	34	15	6	13	73	52	+21	36	
7	Bologna	34	14	8	12	56	46	+10	36	
8	Alessandria	34	14	8	12	55	49	+6	36	
9	Pro Vercelli	34	12	9	13	52	60	−8	33	
10	Brescia	34	13	7	14	45	56	−11	33	
11	Milan	34	11	10	13	52	48	+4	32	
12	Modena	34	11	8	15	48	55	−7	30	
13	Pro Patria	34	12	6	16	46	64	−18	30	
14	Livorno	34	12	5	17	51	79	−28	29	
15	Lazio	34	10	8	16	49	50	−1	28	
16	Triestina	34	11	6	17	42	78	−36	28	
17	Padova (R)	34	11	4	19	52	78	−26	26	Relegation to Serie B
18	Cremonese (R)	34	4	8	22	31	83	−52	16	Relegation to Serie B

Source: lega-calcio.it (in Italian)
Rules for classification: 1) points; 2) goal average
(C) Champions; (R) Relegated

== Results ==
Home \ Away	ALE	AMB	BOL	BRE	CRE	GEN	JUV	LAZ	LIV	MIL	MOD	NAP	PAD	PPA	PVE	ROM	TOR	TRI
Alessandria		1–2	2–3	4–0	3–0	0–2	1–0	4–2	3–2	2–1	1–1	2–1	4–2	0–0	0–2	3–1	3–3	4–1
Ambrosiana	2–0		2–1	5–1	3–2	3–3	2–0	4–2	6–2	2–0	5–1	2–1	6–1	8–0	4–0	6–0	3–0	1–2
Bologna	1–2	2–2		0–0	4–1	0–1	0–1	3–2	6–1	1–1	2–1	3–1	1–2	2–0	2–2	5–2	0–1	2–2
Brescia	2–1	0–0	2–0		4–3	4–1	2–2	3–2	2–0	4–1	3–2	2–1	3–2	2–1	1–0	1–1	0–2	0–1
Cremonese	1–1	0–0	0–3	0–1		1–2	0–0	1–3	1–2	0–2	2–2	0–0	1–1	1–2	0–0	1–0	0–1	2–1
Genoa	2–1	1–4	2–0	1–0	2–1		2–0	2–0	2–0	2–2	2–2	2–2	8–0	6–2	1–0	3–1	1–0	2–1
Juventus	2–1	1–2	2–0	0–0	4–1	0–0		3–1	4–1	3–1	1–0	3–2	3–1	1–0	6–1	2–1	2–0	0–1
Lazio	0–0	1–1	3–0	0–0	6–0	3–0	0–1		3–1	0–0	4–0	0–2	4–0	2–1	3–2	0–1	1–0	0–0
Livorno	2–1	1–2	0–2	5–3	1–1	3–1	1–5	4–0		4–1	2–2	3–0	4–3	2–1	1–1	1–0	1–0	2–0
Milan	0–1	1–2	0–1	4–1	5–2	0–2	1–1	2–2	2–2		1–0	2–2	6–0	3–2	3–0	3–1	1–2	2–1
Modena	0–1	2–0	1–2	2–1	5–1	2–1	2–1	0–0	6–0	1–1		0–5	0–2	2–1	1–1	1–2	2–1	2–1
Napoli	3–1	3–1	2–1	1–1	3–0	1–2	2–2	3–0	1–1	2–1	2–1		1–0	4–2	1–1	1–1	2–0	4–1
Padova	1–3	1–2	2–3	2–1	0–1	0–0	2–1	2–1	3–1	1–1	1–3	3–0		7–0	5–0	3–0	1–0	1–2
Pro Patria	4–0	0–0	2–1	2–0	4–2	0–1	0–1	0–0	5–0	2–1	2–0	3–2	0–0		1–0	6–1	1–0	1–1
Pro Vercelli	2–2	1–0	2–2	2–0	3–2	3–3	1–0	3–1	4–1	0–1	2–1	4–0	5–1	0–0		2–0	0–2	6–0
Roma	1–1	2–0	2–2	2–1	9–0	2–0	2–3	3–1	2–0	1–0	4–2	2–2	8–0	5–0	7–0		3–0	5–0
Torino	2–2	4–1	0–0	5–0	2–3	1–1	0–0	1–0	3–0	0–0	0–0	1–0	3–1	7–0	5–1	1–0		4–1
Triestina	1–0	1–2	0–1	1–0	4–0	0–2	0–1	3–3	3–0	2–2	0–1	3–4	2–1	2–1	3–1	1–1	0–1	

Source: Almanacco Illustrato del Calcio - La Storia 1898-2004, Panini Edizioni, Modena, September 2005 (in Italian)
Legend: Blue = home team win; Yellow = draw; Red = away team win.

== Top goalscorers ==
Rank	Player	Club	Goals
1	(Italy) Giuseppe Meazza	Ambrosiana	31
2	(Italy) Rodolfo Volk	Roma	21
3	(Italy) Antonio Vojak	Napoli	20
3	(Italy) Bruno Maini	Bologna	20
5	(Italy) Elvio Banchero	Genoa	17
5	(Italy) Giovanni Ferrari	Alessandria	17
5	(Italy) Gino Rossetti	Torino	17
5	(Italy) Giovanni Vecchina	Padova	17
9	(Italy) Pietro Serantoni	Ambrosiana	16
10	(Italy) Virgilio Levratto	Genoa	15
10	(Italy) Mario Magnozzi	Livorno	15
10	(Italy) Raimundo Orsi	Juventus	15
13	(Italy) Anton Blazevic	Ambrosiana	14
13	(Italy) Italo Rossi	Pro Patria	14
15	(Italy) Carlo Reguzzoni	Pro Patria	13
15	(Paraguay) (Italy) Attila Sallustro	Napoli	13
15	(Argentina) (Italy) Arturo Chini Ludueña	Roma	13
15	(Italy) Federico Munerati	Juventus	13
15	(Italy) Mario Palandri	Livorno	13

== Sources ==
- Almanacco Illustrato del Calcio - La Storia 1898-2004, Panini Edizioni, Modena, September 2005
- Il Littoriale - years 1929 and 1930
- La Stampa - years 1929 and 1930
