= List of Argentine Americans =

The following is a list of notable Argentine Americans, including both original immigrants who obtained American citizenship.

== List ==
=== Actors and actresses ===
- Alejandro Agresti - film director and producer
- Lorenzo Lamas - actor
- Carlos Alazraqui - actor, comedian, impressionist and voice actor
- Stephanie Beatriz - actress
- Norma Aleandro - actor
- Guy Williams (actor) - American actor of Argentine nationality
- Valentina Zenere - actress
- Alexis Bledel - actress
- Linda Cristal - actress
- Juan Diego Botto - actor
- India Eisley - actress
- Julie Gonzalo - actress; Argentine born, American raised
- Bérénice Bejo - French-Argentine actress
- Michel Brown - actor
- Fernando Lamas - actor and director
- Steve Lemme - actor, writer, and producer\
- Florencia Lozano - actress
- Lorenzo Zurzolo - Italian actor of Argentine descent
- Mía Maestro - actress
- Miguel Mas - actor, writer, director
- Dolores Fonzi - actress
- Eduardo Montes-Bradley - American writer-filmmaker
- Luz Cipriota - actress
- James Morosini - American actor of Argentine Jewish descent
- Camila Morrone - actress, model
- Jacqueline Obradors - American actress
- Luisana Lopilato - actress
- Carolina Kopelioff - actress
- Sebastián Rulli - actor
- Delfina Chaves - actress
- Juan Pablo Di Pace - actor
- J. D. Pardo - American actor of Argentine and Salvadoran descent
- María Eugenia Suárez - actress
- Carlos Olguin-Trelawny - film director, screenwriter and digital artist
- Jake T. Austin - American actor of Argentine nationality
- Cecilia Roth - actress
- Rodrigo Guirao Díaz - actor
- Horacio Pancheri - actor
- Maia Reficco - actress
- Alejandro Rey - actor
- Leonardo Sbaraglia - actor
- Sol Rodriguez - actress
- Macarena Achaga - actress
- Eva De Dominici - actress
- Ignacio Serricchio - actor
- Nick Merico (actor) - actor
- Ignacio Serricchio - actor
- Agustín Della Corte - Uruguayan actor of Argentine descent
- Adrián Suar - Argentine actor
- Anya Taylor-Joy - actress, model
- Alice Pagani - Italian actress of Argentine descent
- Oriana Sabatini - actress, singer, model, and writer
- Brenda Asnicar - actress
- Katie Sarife - American actress of Argentine descent
- Cástulo Guerra - actor
- Carmen Zapata - American actress

=== Journalists ===
- Candela Ferro - journalist, model
- Uki Goñi - journalist, author and historian
- Enrique Gratas - journalist
- Pablo Kleinman - journalist and entrepreneur
- Andrés Oppenheimer - journalist
- David Pakman - journalist
- Daniel Viotto - former news presenter of CNN en Español

=== Models ===
- Valeria Mazza - model
- Iván de Pineda - model
- Yamila Diaz-Rahi - model
- Luján Fernández - model
- Inés Rivero - model
- Solange Gómez - model
- Mica Argañaraz - model
- Valentina Ferrer - model
- Antonela Roccuzzo - model
- Zaira Nara - model
- Wanda Nara - model
- Georgina Rodríguez - model

=== Musicians ===
- Mildred Couper - American composer and pianist
- Jorge Dalto - jazz pianist, born in Argentina
- Carlos Gardel - singer and songwriter
- Diego García - lead singer of the band Elefant and solo artist
- Tini (singer) - singer and actress
- Lali Espósito - singer and actress
- Dick Haymes - singer and actor
- Kevin Johansen - singer, half Argentine
- Gustavo Cerati - singer
- Julio "Jimmy" Ledezma - Argentine-born American musician
- Ana Lenchantin - cellist
- Nathy Peluso - singer
- Paz Lenchantin - musician
- Miguel Mateos - Argentine singer
- Raul Midon - singer-songwriter and guitarist from New Mexico
- María Becerra - singer
- Astor Piazzolla - tango composer
- Silvia Roederer - musician
- Gustavo Santaolalla - musician, composer
- Lalo Schifrin - pianist and composer; composed theme for the Mission: Impossible television series
- Bebu Silvetti - Argentine pianist, composer
- Magdalena Bay - alternative pop duo
- Terig Tucci - composer, violinist, pianist, and mandolinist
- Ezequiel Viñao - composer

=== Science and mathematics ===
- Fernando Caldeiro - astronaut
- Gregory Chaitin - mathematician and theoretical computer scientist
- Graciela Chichilnisky - mathematical economist and an expert on climate change
- Gustavo Scuseria - physics and mathematics
- Irene M. Gamba - mathematician
- Andrew Huberman - neuroscientist
- William Henry Hudson - Argentine-British author, naturalist and ornithologist
- Veronica Prego - medical doctor
- David D. Sabatini - cell biologist
- Eduardo D. Sontag - mathematics
- Carlos Sueldo - physician, professor of medicine

=== Sport ===
- Marcelo Balboa - American former soccer defender
- Diego Maradona - Argentine footballer
- Max Battimo - American hockey referee
- Lionel Messi - Argentine footballer
- Sophia Braun - footballer
- Ernie Buriano - retired Argentine-American footballer
- Franco Colapinto - race car driver
- Tranquilo Cappozzo - rower
- Efrain Chacurian - retired Argentine-American soccer forward
- Renato Corsi - retired American-Argentine footballer
- Matko Miljevic - American-Argentine footballer
- Benjamin Cremaschi - footballer
- Juan DeBiedma - professional Super Smash Bros. Melee player
- Angelo DiBernardo - retired Argentine-American soccer player
- Paul DiBernardo - retired Argentine-American soccer midfielder who coaches youth soccer
- Emiliano Martínez - Argentine footballer
- Héctor Echavarría - kickboxer
- Michael Hoyos - footballer
- Bryan Gerzicich - footballer
- Rodrigo De Paul - Argentine footballer
- Bill Gramática - American football placekicker
- Julián Alvarez - Argentine footballer
- Martin Gramatica - American football placekicker
- Juan Kachmanian - professional wrestler
- Nico Paz - Argentine footballer
- Sebastian Lletget - soccer player
- Horatio Luro - race horse trainer
- Lautaro Martínez - Argentine footballer
- Pablo Mastroeni - footballer
- Angel Penna Sr. and Angel Penna Jr. - race horse trainers
- Claudio Reyna - footballer, half Argentine
- Leandro Paredes - Argentine footballer
- Giovanni Reyna - footballer
- Alan Soñora - footballer
- Joel Soñora - soccer player
- Enzo Fernández - Argentine footballer
- Diana Taurasi - basketball player
- Mauricio Pochettino - head coach of the United States men's national team

=== Visual artists ===
- Sebastian Spreng - visual artist

=== Others ===
- Luis Alberto Ambroggio - poet, scholar, and writer
- Pope Francis - former Pope, supreme leader of the Catholic Church
- Queen Máxima of the Netherlands - Queen of the Netherlands
- Ricardo Fort - Argentine socialite, entrepreneur and television director
- Hector Arzeno - Connecticut state representative
- Lisa Cano Burkhead - lieutenant governor of Nevada
- Andrés Cantor - sportscaster
- Gonzalo Casals - New York City Commissioner of Cultural Affairs
- Bizarrap - record producer
- Santiago Mitre - director and screenwriter
- Billy Dalto - politician
- Ariel Dorfman - author
- Jim Farley - CEO of the Ford Motor Company
- Gerardo L. Munck - professor, academic
- Che Guevara - Argentine revolutionary
- Fabian Nicieza - writer and editor
- Alejandro Orfila - Argentine career diplomat
- Luis Palau - Christian evangelist
- Alicia Partnoy - human rights activist, poet, and translator
- César Pelli - architect
- Henry Pleasants (1833–1880) - Argentine-born, he was a coal mining engineer and an officer in the Union Army during the American Civil War.
- Felix Pogliano - Colorado labor union officer
- Jorge M. Pérez - real estate developer
- Richard Revesz - dean of the New York University School of Law
- Nancy Sutley - Chair of the White House Council on Environmental Quality
- Susana Torre - Argentine-born American architect, critic and educator
- Rodolfo Valentin - New York City hairdresser and entrepreneur
- Alex Yemenidjian - CEO of Armenco Holdings and Regal Entertainment Group
- Cecilia Gentili - Argentine-born transgender activist and author
