= Prego (disambiguation) =

Prego is a U.S. brand of Italian pasta sauce.

Prego, an Italian interjection meaning "You're welcome", may also refer to:

== Arts and entertainment ==
- Prego (film), a 2015 American short comedy film
- "Prego", a 1991 instrumental by Wrathchild America from 3-D
- "Prego", a 2009 song by Melinda Santiago, Sticky Fingaz & Chocolatt from the A Day in the Life film soundtrack

== Food ==
- Prego Restaurant, known as one of the originators of California-style pizza
- Prego (Portuguese sandwich), a grilled beef sandwich in Portuguese cuisine
  - McPrego, a McDonalds sandwich in Portugal; see International availability of McDonald's products
- Prego, a brand of soft drink similar to Rivella

== Other uses ==
- Prego v. City of New York, a 1988 hospital safety negligence lawsuit involving HIV
  - Verónica Prego, American doctor who was the plaintiff in the suit
- Victoria Prego (1948–2024), Spanish journalist
- Prego, a line of cameras from Rollei

== See also ==
- Preggo (disambiguation)
- Pregnancy
