= Pogliano =

Pogliano may refer to:

- Pogliano Milanese, an Italian comune in Lombardy
- Pogliano, a populated placed in Moncucco Torinese, Piedmont

== People ==
- Cesare Pogliano, Italian footballer
- Felix Pogliano, Argentine-American officer of the United Mine Workers of America
- Gilberto Pogliano, Italian professional football player

== See also ==
- Pogliana
- Pugliano
