= Lautaro Martínez =

Argentine footballer (born 1997)

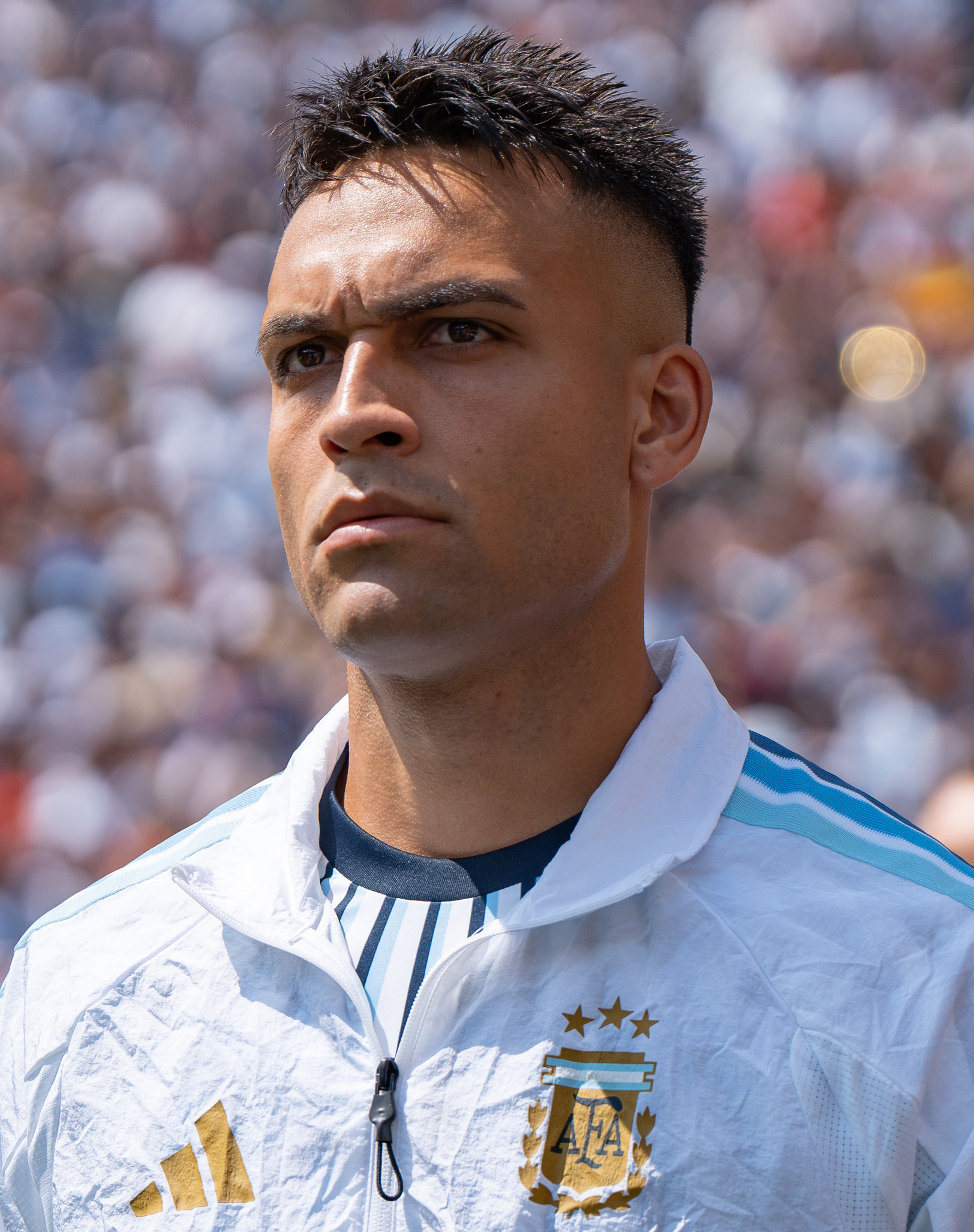
- Martínez with Argentina in 2026

Personal information
- Full name: Lautaro Javier Martínez
- Date of birth: 22 August 1997 (age 29)
- Place of birth: Bahía Blanca, Argentina
- Height: 1.74 m (5 ft 9 in)
- Position: Striker

Team information
- Current team: Inter Milan
- Number: 10

Youth career
- 2006–2014: Liniers
- 2014–2015: Racing Club

Senior career*
Years	Team	Apps	(Gls)
2015–2018	Racing Club	48	(22)
2018–	Inter Milan	273	(136)

International career^{‡}
2016–2017	Argentina U20	11	(7)
2018–	Argentina	87	(42)
Medal record
Men's football
Representing Argentina
FIFA World Cup
Winner	2022 Qatar
Runner-up	2026 Canada–Mexico–US
Copa América
Winner	2021 Brazil
Winner	2024 United States
Third place	2019 Brazil
CONMEBOL–UEFA Cup of Champions
Winner	2022 England
- * Club domestic league appearances and goals as of 22:39, 22 November 2026 (UTC) ‡ National team caps and goals as of 03:31, 7 October 2026 (UTC)

Lautaro Javier Martínez (born 22 August 1997) is an Argentine professional footballer who plays as a striker for Serie A club Inter Milan, which he captains, and the Argentina national team. Known for his work rate, clinical finishing, and tactical ability, he is widely regarded as one of the best strikers in the world.

Martínez began his senior career with Argentine Primera División side Racing Club, before signing with Inter Milan in 2018 in a transfer worth €22.7 million. In his second season with the club, he helped them reach the Europa League final before combining with Romelu Lukaku in a formidable duo to help them win their first Serie A title in 11 years. Following Lukaku's departure from the club, Martínez became Inter's sole striker. He has since won two more Serie A titles and three Coppa Italias, including a double in 2025–26. In the 2023 Coppa Italia final, he scored both of Inter's goals in a 2–1 victory. He was also involved in the club reaching the UEFA Champions League final in 2023 and 2025.

Individually, Martínez was awarded the Serie A Most Valuable Player in 2023–24 and the Serie A Best Striker in 2025–26. He also finished as the league's top scorer in the 2023–24 and 2025–26 seasons. Martínez currently ranks as Inter's third highest all-time top goalscorer.

Martínez first represented Argentina at youth level, playing in both the 2017 FIFA U-20 World Cup and the 2017 South American U-20 Championship. He made his senior international debut in 2018 and has won the 2021 Copa América, 2022 FIFA World Cup, and the 2024 Copa América, winning the Golden Boot as top scorer of the latter and scoring the winner in the final. He was also in the Argentina squad that finished as runners-up at the 2026 FIFA World Cup.

== Club career ==
=== Early career ===
Martínez was born in Bahía Blanca. He followed in his father's footsteps to become a professional footballer, joining local side Liniers, with whom he excelled at U–17 level. In 2013, he scored 13 goals in the U–17 league and netted in the final of the National Cup, though Liniers ultimately lost on penalties to Rosario.

=== Racing Club ===
Martínez's form at youth level caught the attention of Racing Club interim coach Fabio Radaelli who subsequently signed him in January 2014. Soon after joining the club, Martínez began suffering from homesickness and wanted to return to his hometown. He was ultimately convinced by teammate Braian Mansilla to stay and went on to score 53 goals in 64 appearances for the club's reserve side. In 2015, a deal was concluded between Racing Club and Spanish side Real Madrid for Martínez's signature but he chose to remain in Argentina. Martínez's father, Mario later revealed that he chose to stay with Racing at the time as he was not ready to leave the club. His league debut followed on 1 November 2015 when he came on as a second-half substitute for Diego Milito in a 3–0 win over Crucero del Norte. On 17 April 2016, he was sent off for the first time in his career after picking up two bookings in the space of five minutes in a 2–2 draw with Argentinos. He scored his first goal later that year, netting the opener in a 1–1 draw with Huracán in November.

Following an injury to regular starting striker Lisandro López, Martínez assumed a more senior role for the 2016–17 season, scoring 9 goals in 23 league appearances for the campaign. He continued to lead the line for Racing during the first half of the following season and in December 2017 underwent a medical with La Liga side Atlético Madrid. Reports followed that Martínez had signed for Atlético Madrid side but Racing later announced that he had signed a renewed contract which included an increased release clause. They also criticised their Spanish contemporaries for submitting him to a medical without their permission. He ended the year with a man of the match performance, scoring once and assisting another in a 3–1 win over Gimnasia. On 27 February, he scored his second hat-trick of the season when he scored three times on his Copa Libertadores debut against Brazilian side Cruzeiro. Racing won the match 4–2.

That same month, Martínez was linked with a transfer to Italian side Inter Milan and on 5 May Racing Club President Victor Blanco confirmed that the sale had gone through. Blanco indicated that Martínez was set to join Inter ahead of the 2018–19 Serie A campaign but that he would attempt to keep him on loan until December 2018 in order for the striker to continue to participate in the Argentine side's Copa Libertadores campaign.

=== Inter Milan ===
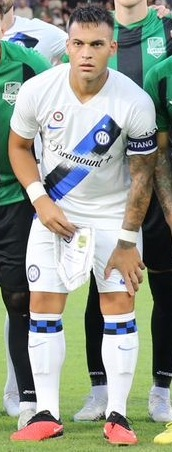
Martínez with Inter Milan in 2023

Martínez joined Inter on 4 July 2018 for a reported fee of €22.7 million and he signed a five-year contract with the club. He made his unofficial debut ten days later and scored in a 3–0 friendly win over Swiss club, Lugano. His full debut followed on 19 August when he started in a 1–0 Serie A loss to Sassuolo in the opening week. He scored his first league goal against Cagliari, the opener of a 2–0 win at San Siro on 29 September.

Martínez scored his first European goal on 14 February 2019, netting a penalty to help Inter win against Rapid Wien, in the first leg of 2018–19 UEFA Europa League round of 32. Following this match, he began to start in every match, profiting from Mauro Icardi's absence for personal reasons. In his first Derby della Madonnina match against city rivals Milan, Martínez first assisted Matías Vecino's header before scoring himself a penalty in the second half, helping Inter to win 3–2; Inter retook the third place in Serie A, and also achieved the first league double over them since 2011–12 season.

On 2 October 2019, Lautaro Martínez scored his first goal in UEFA Champions League in a 2–1 away defeat to Barcelona in group stage; he became the first player since Roberto Boninsegna in 1970 to score at Camp Nou for Inter. Later in the competition, by scoring a brace in a 3–1 away win against Slavia Prague, Martínez reached two milestones: he became only the fourth Inter player (after Hernán Crespo in 2002, Christian Vieri in 2003 and Samuel Eto'o in 2010) and the fifth Argentinian player (after Hernan Crespo in 2002, Lionel Messi in six occasions, Sergio Agüero in 2019 and Ezequiel Lavezzi in 2013) to score in four consecutive Champions League games. On 17 August 2020, Martínez scored a brace in a 5–0 win against Shakhtar Donetsk to reach the 2020 UEFA Europa League final. On 8 March 2022, Martínez scored against Liverpool in a 1–0 victory at Anfield, marking Inter's first Champions League knockout goal in 3,600 days.

On 16 May 2023, he scored the only goal in a 1–0 victory over rivals Milan in the Champions League semi-final second leg, which secured a 3–0 win on aggregate for his club and qualification to the Champions League final for the first time since 2010. On 24 May, he scored a brace in a 2–1 victory over Fiorentina, to achieve his second consecutive Coppa Italia.

Martínez, who became the club's captain following Samir Handanović, began the 2023–24 season, his sixth with the club, as the first choice striker, albeit once again without his strike partner Romelu Lukaku after he returned to Chelsea finishing the end of his loan spell. He began the season with an immediate impact for Inter, scoring both goals in a 2–0 home win over Monza on the first match day, and then scoring Inter's second goal the following week in another 2–0 win away against Cagliari.

On 30 September 2023, after replacing Alexis Sánchez in the 55th minute of Inter's 4–0 win against Salernitana, Martínez became the first player in Serie A history to score 4 goals as a substitute. On 25 February 2024, Martínez scored twice in a 4–0 away league win against Lecce, the first goal was his 100th Serie A goal and the second was his 22nd league goal of the season (with only 23 games played), surpassing his personal record of most league goals in a season. Martínez eventually won the Capocannoniere award in the 2023–24 season, finishing as the top scorer in Serie A with 24 goals. He also won the Serie A MVP for the season.

On 29 January 2025, he netted his first Champions League hat-trick, the first goal of which was a penalty, in a 3–0 victory over Monaco. On 16 April, he netted his 150th goal for Inter in a 2–2 draw against Bayern Munich during the Champions League quarter-finals, in addition to becoming the first player to score for the club in five consecutive matches in the competition. In the second leg of the semi-finals against Barcelona, he scored a goal and delivered an assist, contributing to a 4–3 victory after extra time and helping his team reach their second Champions League final in three years.

Upon scoring his 171st goal for Inter in their 5–0 victory over Sassuolo on 8 February 2026, Martinez became the club's joint third all-time top goalscorer, along with Roberto Boninsegna. Two months later, on 5 April, he netted a brace in a 5–2 victory over Roma, taking sole possession of third place, behind only Giuseppe Meazza and Alessandro Altobelli. On 24 May, he became Capocannoniere for the 2025–26 season by finishing top scorer of the Serie A with 17 goals, winning the award for the second time. During the 2026 summer transfer window, Martínez attracted interest from Barcelona but chose to remain at Inter, citing his happiness with the club, his teammates and supporters.

== International career ==
=== Youth team ===
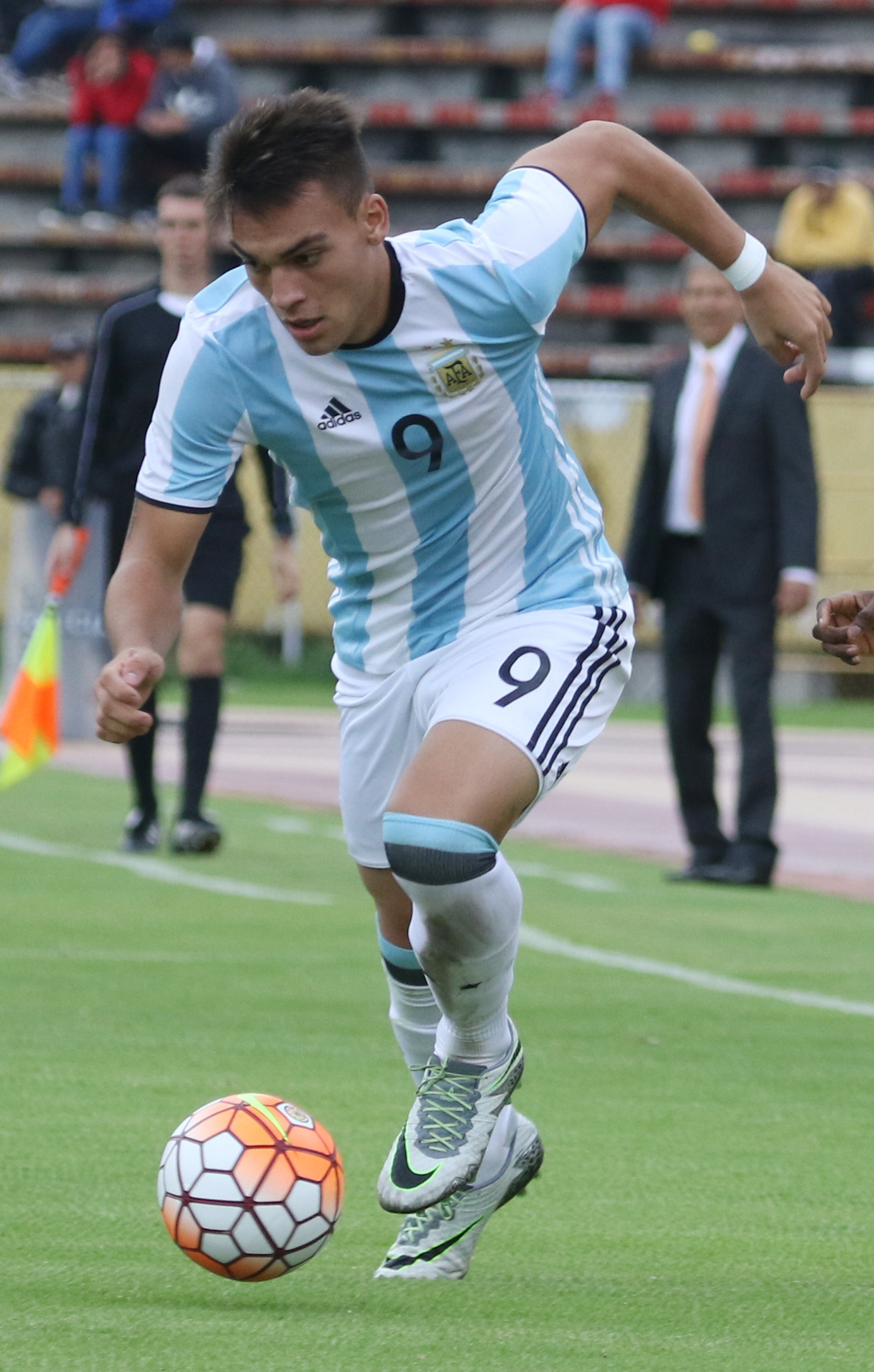
Martínez playing for Argentina U20 at the 2017 South American U-20 Championship

In 2017, Martínez represented Argentina at the 2017 South American U-20 Championship where he ended as the tournament's joint-top scorer with five goals, in the process helping Argentina qualify for the 2017 FIFA U-20 World Cup.

He was subsequently named in the squad for the World Cup which kicked off in May that year. In the build-up to the tournament, he suffered damage to his nasal cartilage after being struck by a knee in a warm-up match against Vietnam. As a result of the injury, he started Argentina's opening match at the tournament against England from the bench and was later sent off after video technology indicated that he had lashed out at Fikayo Tomori. Upon doing so, he became the first ever player to be dismissed after a video referral, and Argentina ultimately lost the match 3–0. On his return, he scored a brace in a 5–0 win over Guinea, though his goals were not enough to prevent Argentina from being eliminated from the group-stages.

=== Senior team ===
On 12 March 2018, Martínez received his first call-up for the senior team for two friendly matches against Italy and Spain. He made his debut against the latter on 27 March, coming on as a substitute for Gonzalo Higuaín in a 6–1 defeat. In May 2018 he was named in Argentina's preliminary squad for the 2018 FIFA World Cup in Russia but was omitted from the final selection. Later that year, he made his full debut in a 4–0 Superclásico Championship win over Iraq, during which he also scored his first senior international goal.

In May 2019, Martínez was included in Lionel Scaloni's final 23-man Argentina squad for the 2019 Copa América. In Argentina's final group match against Qatar on 23 June, he scored the opening goal in a 2–0 win, which enabled them to advance to the knock-out stages of the competition. On 28 June, in the quarter-finals of the tournament, Martínez scored the opening goal in an eventual 2–0 win over Venezuela with a back-heel in the opening ten minutes of the match; he was later named Man of the match, and the victory enabled Argentina to advance to the semi-finals of the competition.

On 10 September 2019, Martínez scored his first international hat-trick in a friendly against Mexico, which Argentina won, 4–0.

On 28 June 2021, he scored Argentina's final goal in a 4–1 win over Bolivia in his nation's final group match of the 2021 Copa América. On 3 July, he scored the second goal in a 3–0 win over Ecuador in the quarter-finals of the competition. On 6 July, Martínez scored the opening goal in a 1–1 draw in the semi-finals against Colombia; he later netted his spot kick in Argentina's eventual 3–2 penalty shoot-out victory to progress to the final.

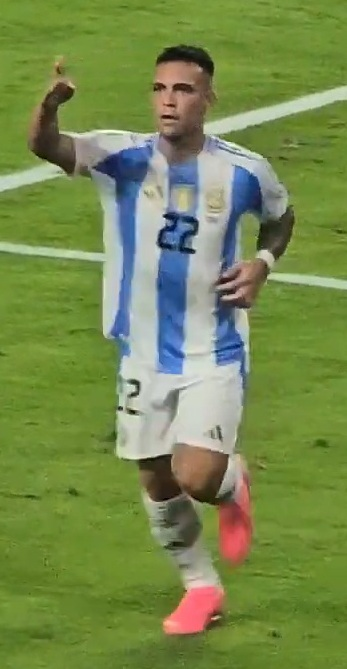
Martínez with Argentina at the 2024 Copa América

On 1 June 2022, Martínez scored the opening goal and provided an assist for Ángel Di María in a 3–0 win over reigning European Champions Italy at Wembley Stadium in the 2022 Finalissima.

Martínez was included in the final 26-man squad for the 2022 FIFA World Cup by Lionel Scaloni. Although he was struggling with an ankle injury, he started the initial two games of the tournament, having a goal disallowed for offside in Argentina's opening 2–1 defeat to Saudi Arabia, before being dropped from the starting lineup for Julián Álvarez, and would come off the bench for the remainder of the tournament, going scoreless throughout the competition. On 9 December 2022, during the quarter-final, Martínez scored the winning penalty in Argentina's 4–3 shoot-out victory against the Netherlands to send his side into the semi-finals. On 18 December, during the final, he replaced Álvarez in extra-time as Argentina defeated France, 4–2, in the penalty shoot-out after the match ended 3–3 in extra-time to win the World Cup.

At the 2024 Copa América, Martínez scored Argentina's second goal in the team's opening 2–0 win over Canada. He followed this up with the only goal of the match in a win against Chile, which allowed Argentina to advance to the knock-out stages. In Argentina's final group match against Peru, he scored both goals in a 2–0 win. In the final against Colombia, Martínez scored the only goal in the 112th minute of the game during extra time, putting Argentina up 1–0, and eventually winning them the tournament. With his 5 goals in the tournament, he was awarded the Golden Boot as the competition's top goalscorer.

Martínez playing for Argentina at the 2026 FIFA World Cup

On 27 May 2026, Martínez was selected in the 26-man squad for the 2026 FIFA World Cup. A month later, on 27 June, he netted his first World Cup goal, converting a penalty in a 3–1 victory over Jordan. He provided an assist for Enzo Fernández's stoppage-time goal in a 3–2 victory over Egypt in the round of 16, helping his team complete a comeback after trailing 2–0. On 11 July, Martínez scored Argentina's third goal of the game in the 121st minute of extra time in their quarterfinal victory over Switzerland. On 15 July, Martínez scored the decisive second goal in stoppage time during Argentina's 2–1 semi-final triumph over England, sending his team into a second straight World Cup final. He was left on the bench in the final, as Spain defeated Argentina 1–0 after extra-time.

== Style of play ==
Martínez initially played as a defender in his youth and later switched to a forward, citing Radamel Falcao as one of his influences. A quick and agile player, he is known for his dribbling skills, his prolific goalscoring, his positioning in the box, and his physical strength and aerial prowess despite not being particularly tall; however, he has been criticised by pundits for his lack of accuracy when taking penalties. He also possesses good link-up play and defensive work-rate, and is capable of assisting goals in addition to scoring goals himself; because of this, he can also play as a second striker, aside from his usual role as a striker.

Due to his leadership and winning mentality, he has been nicknamed El Toro ("The Bull", in Spanish). In 2020, Spencer Rance of 90min.com regarded Martínez as one of the most promising young players, while manager Mauricio Pochettino regarded him as one of the best strikers of his generation. Former Argentina and Inter striker Hernán Crespo likened Martínez to compatriot Sergio Agüero in 2020.

== Personal life ==
Since 2016, Martínez has been in a relationship with Agustina Gandolfo, an Argentine entrepreneur and fitness trainer. On 27 May 2023, they got married in Villa d'Este on Lake Como, Italy.

== Career statistics ==
=== Club ===
As of match played 22 November 2026

Appearances and goals by club, season and competition
Club	Season	League			National cup (Note: Includes Copa Argentina, Coppa Italia)		Continental		Other		Total	
Club	Season	Division	Apps	Goals	Apps	Goals	Apps	Goals	Apps	Goals	Apps	Goals
Racing	2015	Argentine Primera División	1	0	0	0	0	0	—		1	0
Racing	2016	Argentine Primera División	3	0	2	0	0	0	—		5	0
Racing	2016–17	Argentine Primera División	23	9	0	0	5 (Note: Appearances in Copa Sudamericana)	0	—		28	9
Racing	2017–18	Argentine Primera División	21	13	1	0	6 (Note: Appearances in Copa Libertadores)	5	—		28	18
Racing	Total		48	22	3	0	11	5	—		62	27
Inter Milan	2018–19	Serie A	27	6	2	2	6 (Note: Three appearances in UEFA Champions League, three appearances and one goal in UEFA Europa League)	1	—		35	9
Inter Milan	2019–20	Serie A	35	14	3	0	11 (Note: Six appearances and five goals in UEFA Champions League, five appearances and two goals in UEFA Europa League)	7	—		49	21
Inter Milan	2020–21	Serie A	38	17	4	1	6 (Note: Appearances in UEFA Champions League)	1	—		48	19
Inter Milan	2021–22	Serie A	35	21	5	2	8	1	1 (Note: Appearance(s) in Supercoppa Italiana)	1	49	25
Inter Milan	2022–23	Serie A	38	21	5	3	13	3	1	1	57	28
Inter Milan	2023–24	Serie A	33	24	1	0	8	2	2	1	44	27
Inter Milan	2024–25	Serie A	31	12	2	0	14	9	6 (Note: Two appearances and one goal in Supercoppa Italiana, four appearances and two goals in FIFA Club World Cup)	3	53	24
Inter Milan	2025–26	Serie A	30	17	2	1	8	4	1	0	41	22
Inter Milan	2026–27	Serie A	6	4	0	0	2	2	0	0	8	6
Inter Milan	Total		273	136	24	9	76	30	11	6	384	181
Career total			320	158	27	9	87	35	11	6	446	208

=== International ===
As of match played 6 October 2026

Appearances and goals by national team and year
National team	Year	Apps	Goals
Argentina	2018	4	1
Argentina	2019	13	8
Argentina	2020	4	2
Argentina	2021	14	6
Argentina	2022	11	4
Argentina	2023	8	0
Argentina	2024	16	11
Argentina	2025	5	4
Argentina	2026	12	6
Total		87	42

As of match played 3 October 2026
Scores and results list Argentina's goal tally first, score column indicates score after each Martínez goal.

List of international goals scored by Lautaro Martínez
No.	Date	Venue	Cap	Opponent	Score	Result	Competition
1	11 October 2018	Prince Faisal bin Fahd Sports City Stadium, Riyadh, Saudi Arabia	2	Iraq	1–0	4–0	2018 Superclásico Championship
2	22 March 2019	Metropolitano Stadium, Madrid, Spain	5	Venezuela	1–2	1–3	Friendly
3	7 June 2019	Estadio San Juan del Bicentenario, San Juan, Argentina	7	Nicaragua	3–1	5–1	Friendly
4	7 June 2019	Estadio San Juan del Bicentenario, San Juan, Argentina	7	Nicaragua	4–1	5–1	Friendly
5	23 June 2019	Arena do Grêmio, Porto Alegre, Brazil	9	Qatar	1–0	2–0	2019 Copa América
6	28 June 2019	Estádio do Maracanã, Rio de Janeiro, Brazil	10	Venezuela	1–0	2–0	2019 Copa América
7	10 September 2019	Alamodome, San Antonio, United States	13	Mexico	1–0	4–0	Friendly
8	10 September 2019	Alamodome, San Antonio, United States	13	Mexico	2–0	4–0	Friendly
9	10 September 2019	Alamodome, San Antonio, United States	13	Mexico	4–0	4–0	Friendly
10	13 October 2020	Hernando Siles Stadium, La Paz, Bolivia	19	Bolivia	1–1	2–1	2022 FIFA World Cup qualification
11	17 November 2020	National Stadium of Peru, Lima, Peru	21	Peru	2–0	2–0	2022 FIFA World Cup qualification
12	28 June 2021	Arena Pantanal, Cuiabá, Brazil	26	Bolivia	4–1	4–1	2021 Copa América
13	3 July 2021	Estádio Olímpico Pedro Ludovico, Goiânia, Brazil	27	Ecuador	2–0	3–0	2021 Copa América
14	6 July 2021	Estádio Nacional Mané Garrincha, Brasília, Brazil	28	Colombia	1–0	1–1	2021 Copa América
15	2 September 2021	Estadio Olímpico de la UCV, Caracas, Venezuela	30	Venezuela	1–0	3–1	2022 FIFA World Cup qualification
16	10 October 2021	Estadio Monumental, Buenos Aires, Argentina	32	Uruguay	3–0	3–0	2022 FIFA World Cup qualification
17	14 October 2021	Estadio Monumental, Buenos Aires, Argentina	33	Peru	1–0	1–0	2022 FIFA World Cup qualification
18	27 January 2022	Estadio Zorros del Desierto, Calama, Chile	36	Chile	2–1	2–1	2022 FIFA World Cup qualification
19	1 February 2022	Estadio Mario Alberto Kempes, Córdoba, Argentina	37	Colombia	1–0	1–0	2022 FIFA World Cup qualification
20	1 June 2022	Wembley Stadium, London, England	38	Italy	1–0	3–0	2022 Finalissima
21	23 September 2022	Hard Rock Stadium, Miami Gardens, United States	39	Honduras	1–0	3–0	Friendly
22	26 March 2024	Los Angeles Memorial Coliseum, Los Angeles, United States	56	Costa Rica	3–1	3–1	Friendly
23	14 June 2024	Commanders Field, Landover, United States	58	Guatemala	2–1	4–1	Friendly
24	14 June 2024	Commanders Field, Landover, United States	58	Guatemala	3–1	4–1	Friendly
25	20 June 2024	Mercedes-Benz Stadium, Atlanta, United States	59	Canada	2–0	2–0	2024 Copa América
26	25 June 2024	MetLife Stadium, East Rutherford, United States	60	Chile	1–0	1–0	2024 Copa América
27	29 June 2024	Hard Rock Stadium, Miami Gardens, United States	61	Peru	1–0	2–0	2024 Copa América
28	29 June 2024	Hard Rock Stadium, Miami Gardens, United States	61	Peru	2–0	2–0	2024 Copa América
29	14 July 2024	Hard Rock Stadium, Miami Gardens, United States	64	Colombia	1–0	1–0 (a.e.t.)	2024 Copa América
30	15 October 2024	Estadio Monumental, Buenos Aires, Argentina	68	Bolivia	2–0	6–0	2026 FIFA World Cup qualification
31	14 November 2024	Estadio Defensores del Chaco, Asunción, Paraguay	69	Paraguay	1–0	1–2	2026 FIFA World Cup qualification
32	19 November 2024	La Bombonera, Buenos Aires, Argentina	70	Peru	1–0	1–0	2026 FIFA World Cup qualification
33	4 September 2025	Estadio Monumental, Buenos Aires, Argentina	71	Venezuela	2–0	3–0	2026 FIFA World Cup qualification
34	14 October 2025	Chase Stadium, Fort Lauderdale, United States	74	Puerto Rico	5–0	6–0	Friendly
35	14 October 2025	Chase Stadium, Fort Lauderdale, United States	74	Puerto Rico	6–0	6–0	Friendly
36	14 November 2025	Estádio 11 de Novembro, Luanda, Angola	75	Angola	1–0	2–0	Friendly
37	6 June 2026	Kyle Field, College Station, United States	76	Honduras	1–0	2–0	Friendly
38	27 June 2026	AT&T Stadium, Arlington, United States	80	Jordan	2–0	3–1	2026 FIFA World Cup
39	11 July 2026	Arrowhead Stadium, Kansas City, United States	83	Switzerland	3–1	3–1 (a.e.t.)	2026 FIFA World Cup
40	15 July 2026	Mercedes-Benz Stadium, Atlanta, United States	84	England	2–1	2–1	2026 FIFA World Cup
41	30 September 2026	Estadio Mario Alberto Kempes, Córdoba, Argentina	85	Bolivia	1–0	4–0	Friendly
42	3 October 2026	Estadio Monumental, Buenos Aires, Argentina	86	Burkina Faso	1–0	7–0	Friendly

== Honours ==
Inter Milan

- Serie A: 2020–21, 2023–24, 2025–26
- Coppa Italia: 2021–22, 2022–23, 2025–26
- Supercoppa Italiana: 2021, 2022, 2023
- UEFA Champions League runner-up: 2022–23, 2024–25
- UEFA Europa League runner-up: 2019–20

Argentina

- FIFA World Cup: 2022; runner-up: 2026
- Copa América: 2021, 2024
- CONMEBOL–UEFA Cup of Champions: 2022

Individual

- South American Youth Football Championship top scorer: 2017
- Argentine Primera División Breakthrough Player: 2017–18
- Argentine Primera División Team of the Year: 2017–18
- UEFA Europa League Squad of the Season: 2019–20
- IFFHS CONMEBOL Team of the Year: 2020, 2021, 2023, 2024, 2025
- Gazzetta Sports Awards Performance of the Year: 2023
- Copa América Golden Boot: 2024
- Copa América Team of the Tournament: 2024
- IFFHS Top 11 Copa América: 2024
- Serie A Player of the Month: October 2023, December 2025, May 2026
- Serie A Most Valuable Player: 2023–24
- Capocannoniere: 2023–24, 2025–26
- EA Sports FC Serie A Team of the Season: 2023–24, 2025–26
- ESM Team of the Year: 2023–24
- Golden Foot: 2024
- Serie A Team of the Year: 2023–24, 2024–25, 2025–26
- Serie A Footballer of the Year: 2024
- Serie A Best Striker: 2025–26
