= List of Inter Milan records and statistics =

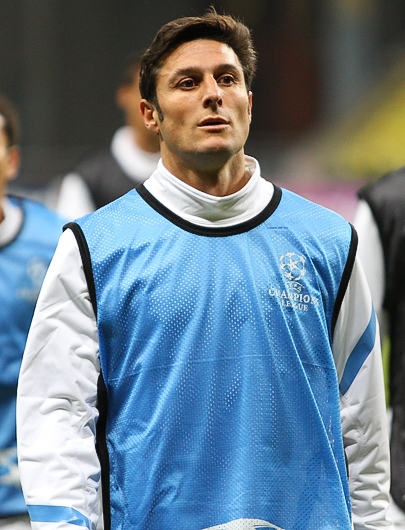
Javier Zanetti, pictured here in 2011, holds the records for most appearances with the club, with 858.

Football Club Internazionale Milano is an Italian professional association football club based in Milan that currently plays in the Italian Serie A. They were one of the founding members of Serie A in 1929, and are the only club never to have been relegated from the league. They have also been involved in European football, winning the UEFA Champions League and the UEFA Cup three times each. Inter become the first Italian club to win back-to-back European Cups, achieving the feat in 1964 and 1965.

This list encompasses the major honours won by Inter Milan and records set by the club, their managers and their players. The player records section includes details of the club's leading goalscorers and those who have made most appearances in first-team competitions. It also records notable achievements by Inter Milan players on the international stage, and the highest transfer fees paid and received by the club.

Inter has set various records since its founding. In 2010, Inter became the first Italian club to win the treble consisting of Serie A, the Coppa Italia and the UEFA Champions League. Between 2005 and 2010, Inter won five consecutive national championships, a record which was broken by Juventus in the 2016–17 season. Inter has also signed several high-profile players, setting the world record in transfer fees on two occasions with the purchase of Ronaldo in 1997 and Christian Vieri in 1999.

The statistics listed below are updated to 10 October 2026.

== Honours ==
Inter Milan have won 39 domestic trophies, including the league 21 times, the Coppa Italia ten times and the Supercoppa Italiana eight times. From 2006 to 2010, the club won five successive league titles, equalling the all-time record in that period. Inter has won the Champions League three times; two back-to-back titles in 1964 and 1965, and then another in 2010. The 2010 title completed an unprecedented Italian treble along with the Coppa Italia and the Scudetto. The club has also won three UEFA Cups, two Intercontinental Cups and one FIFA Club World Cup.

=== National titles ===
Serie A:

- Winners (21): 1909–10, 1919–20, 1929–30, 1937–38, 1939–40, 1952–53, 1953–54, 1962–63, 1964–65, 1965–66, 1970–71, 1979–80, 1988–89, 2005–06, (Note: Title was awarded retrospectively following the Calciopoli scandal.) 2006–07, 2007–08, 2008–09, 2009–10, 2020–21, 2023–24, 2025–26
- Runners-up (17): 1932–33, 1933–34, 1934–35, 1940–41, 1948–49, 1950–51, 1961–62, 1963–64, 1966–67, 1969–70, 1992–93, 1997–98, 2002–03, 2010–11, 2019–20, 2021–22, 2024–25

Coppa Italia:

- Winners (10): 1938–39, 1977–78, 1981–82, 2004–05, 2005–06, 2009–10, 2010–11, 2021–22, 2022–23, 2025–26
- Runners-up (6): 1958–59, 1964–65, 1976–77, 1999–2000, 2006–07, 2007–08

Supercoppa Italiana:

- Winners (8): 1989, 2005, 2006, 2008, 2010, 2021, 2022, 2023
- Runners-up (5): 2000, 2007, 2009, 2011, 2024

=== International titles ===
The following titles include only those which are recognised by UEFA and FIFA.

==== World-wide titles ====
Intercontinental Cup:

- Winners (2): 1964, 1965

Intercontinental Supercup:

- Runners-up (1): 1968

FIFA Club World Cup:

- Winners (1): 2010

==== European titles ====
European Cup/UEFA Champions League:

- Winners (3): 1963–64, 1964–65, 2009–10
- Runners-up (4): 1966–67, 1971–72, 2022–23, 2024–25

UEFA Cup/UEFA Europa League:

- Winners (3): 1990–91, 1993–94, 1997–98
- Runners-up (2): 1996–97, 2019–20

UEFA Super Cup:

- Runners-up (1): 2010

Mitropa Cup:

- Runners-up (1): 1933

=== Youth Team honours ===
Trofeo Giacinto Facchetti:

- Champions (11): 1964, 1966, 1969, 1989, 2002, 2007, 2012, 2017, 2018, 2022, 2025

Primavera Italian Cup:

- Champions (6): 1973, 1976, 1977, 1978, 2006, 2016

Supercoppa Primavera:

- Champions (2): 2017, 2025

Campionato De Martino / Campionato Under 23:

- Champions (8): 1957, 1958, 1959, 1961, 1962, 1963, 1966, 1975

Viareggio World Club Tournament, Carnevale Cup:

- Champions (8): 1962, 1971, 1986, 2002, 2008, 2011, 2015, 2018

Blue Stars/FIFA Youth Cup:

- Champions (1): 1983

Champions Under-18 Challenge::

- Champions (1): 2010

NextGen Series:

- Champions (1): 2011–12

Under 13 Championship:

- Champions (1): 2018

Under 14 Championship:

- Champions (7): 2010, 2011, 2012, 2015, 2016, 2018, 2022

Under 15 Championship:

- Champions (10): 1988, 1997, 2003, 2006, 2009, 2012, 2013, 2015, 2018, 2023

Under 16 Championship:

- Champions (1): 2018

Under 17 Championship:

- Champions (8): 1985, 1987, 1991, 1998, 2008, 2014, 2017, 2019

Under 19 Championship:

- Champions (6): 1980, 1984, 1991, 2012, 2016, 2017

Under 20 Championship:

- Champions (8): 1975, 1983, 1989, 1990, 1991, 2014, 2015, 2017

Supercoppa Under-17:

- Champions (3): 2014, 2017, 2019

Supercoppa Under-15:

- Champions (1): 2018

Filippo De Cecco Tournament:

- Champions (2): 2006, 2008

== Club statistics ==
=== Divisional movements ===
Series	Years	Last	Promotions	Relegations
A	95	2026–27	–	never
95 years of professional football in Italy since 1929
Founding member of the Football League's First Division in 1921

=== Serie A ===
- Most seasons played in Serie A: 95 (from 1929–30 season to 2026–27 season) (sole club that has played Serie A football in every season from 1909 to 2027)
- Most consecutive wins: 17 (in 2006–07 season)

=== Matches ===
==== Firsts ====
- First league match: Milan 3–2 Inter, Prima Categoria, 10 January 1909
- First Coppa Italia match: Inter 14–0 Acciaierie e Ferriere Novi, 11 November 1926
- First European match: Inter 0–0 Birmingham City, Inter-Cities Fairs Cup, 16 May 1956.

==== Wins ====
- Record win: 16–0 against ACIVI Vicenza, Prima Categoria, 10 January 1915
- Record Serie A win: 9–0 against Casale, 10 September 1933
- Record Coppa Italia win: 7–0 against Mantova, 14 September 1958
- Record win in European competitions: 7–0 against Lyon, Inter-Cities Fairs Cup, 10 December 1958
- Most wins in a Serie A season: 30 (out of 38 games), during the 2006–07 season

==== Defeats ====
- Record Serie A defeat: 1–9 against Juventus, 10 June 1961.
- Record Coppa Italia defeat:
  - 0–5 against Milan, 8 January 1998
- Record defeat in European competitions:
  - 0–5 against Paris Saint-Germain, UEFA Champions League, 31 May 2025
- Most defeats in a Serie A season: 19 (out of 40 games), during the 1947–48 season
- Fewest defeats in a Serie A season: 1 (out of 38 games), during the 2006–07 season

=== Points ===
- Most points in a Serie A season:
  - Two points for a win: 58 in 34 games, during the 1988–89 season
  - Three points for a win: 97 in 38 games, during the 2006–07 season
- Fewest points in a Serie A season:
  - Two points for a win: 26 in 30 games, during the 1941–42 season
  - Three points for a win: 46 in 34 games, during the 1998–99 season

== Player statistics ==
=== Most appearances ===
Rank	Nationality	Player	Position	Years	League	Cup	Europe	Others	Total
1	Argentina	Javier Zanetti	DF	1995–2014	615	71	159	13	858
2	Italy	Giuseppe Bergomi	DF	1979–1999	519	120	117	1	756
3	Italy	Giacinto Facchetti	DF	1960–1978	476	85	68	5	634
4	Italy	Sandro Mazzola	FW	1960–1977	418	80	63	4	565
5	Italy	Giuseppe Baresi	DF	1977–1992	392	92	74	1	559
6	Italy	Mario Corso	FW	1958–1973	414	41	48	5	503
7	Italy	Walter Zenga	GK	1982–1994	328	73	71	1	473
8	Italy	Tarcisio Burgnich	DF	1962–1974	359	47	57	4	467
9	Italy	Alessandro Altobelli	FW	1977–1988	317	80	69	0	466
10	Colombia	Iván Córdoba	DF	2000–2012	324	34	92	5	455
10	Slovenia	Samir Handanović	GK	2012–2023	380	22	52	1	455

- Most appearances made in official competitions: 858 – Javier Zanetti, 1995–2014

=== Top goalscorers ===
Rank	Nationality	Player	Position	Years	League	Cup	Europe	Others	Total
1	Italy	Giuseppe Meazza	FW	1927–1940; 1946–1947	243	12	0	29	284
2	Italy	Alessandro Altobelli	FW	1977–1988	128	46	35	0	209
3	Argentina	Lautaro Martínez	FW	2018–present	136	9	28	6	181
4	Italy	Roberto Boninsegna	FW	1969–1976	113	36	22	0	171
5	Italy	Sandro Mazzola	FW	1960–1977	116	24	18	3	161
6	Italy	Luigi Cevenini	FW	1912–1915; 1919–1921; 1922–1927	158	0	0	0	158
7	Italy	Benito Lorenzi	FW	1947–1958	138	2	3	0	143
8	Hungary	István Nyers	FW	1948–1954	133	0	0	0	133
9	Argentina	Mauro Icardi	FW	2013–2019	111	3	10	0	124
10	Italy	Christian Vieri	FW	1999–2005	103	8	12	0	123

- Most goals scored in official competitions: 284 – Giuseppe Meazza, 1927–1940 & 1946–1947

=== Inter Milan's top flight top goalscorers ===
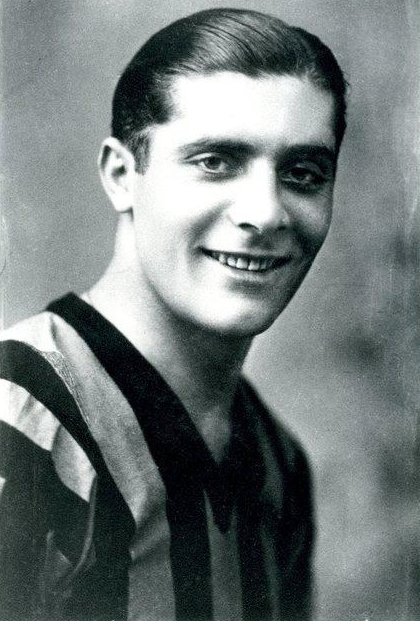
"il Balilla" Giuseppe Meazza was named top goalscorer three times with Inter, respectively in 1929–30, 1935–36 and 1937–38 seasons.

This is the top ten of Inter's top league goalscorers in a single season.

Rank	Player	Season	Goals
1	Luigi Cevenini	1913–14	35
2	Antonio Angelillo	1958–59	33
3	Emilio Agradi	1914–15	31
3	Luigi Cevenini	1920–21	31
3	Giuseppe Meazza	1929–30	31
6	Mauro Icardi (Note: Icardi finished the season as joint top scorer along with Lazio's Ciro Immobile.)	2017–18	29
7	István Nyers	1948–49	26
8	Ernest Peterly	1909–10	25
8	Giuseppe Meazza	1935–36	25
8	Zlatan Ibrahimović	2008–09	25

=== Award winners ===
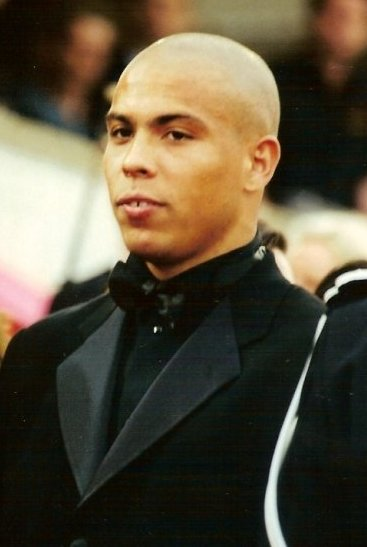
Ronaldo was the last Inter Milan player to win the FIFA World Player of the Year award.

FIFA World Player of the Year

The following players won the FIFA World Player of the Year award whilst playing for Inter Milan:
- 2002 – (Brazil) Ronaldo
- 1997 – (Brazil) Ronaldo
- 1991 – (Germany) Lothar Matthäus

Ballon d'Or/European Footballer of the Year

The following players have won the Ballon d'Or award whilst playing for Inter Milan:
- 1997 – (Brazil) Ronaldo
- 1990 – (Germany) Lothar Matthäus

World Soccer Player of the Year

The following players have won the World Player of the Year award whilst playing for Inter Milan:
- 2002 – (Brazil) Ronaldo
- 1997 – (Brazil) Ronaldo
- 1990 – (Germany) Lothar Matthäus

UEFA Club Footballer of the Year

The following players have won the UEFA Club Footballer of the Year award whilst playing for Inter Milan:
- 2009–10 – (Argentina) Diego Milito
- 1997–98 – (Brazil) Ronaldo

Serie A Footballer of the Year

The following players have won the Serie A Footballer of the Year award whilst playing for Inter Milan:
- 2026 – (Italy) Federico Dimarco
- 2024 – (Argentina) Lautaro Martínez
- 2021 – (Belgium) Romelu Lukaku
- 2018 – (Argentina) Mauro Icardi
- 2010 – (Argentina) Diego Milito
- 2009 – (Sweden) Zlatan Ibrahimović
- 2008 – (Sweden) Zlatan Ibrahimović
- 1998 – (Brazil) Ronaldo

Serie A Goalkeeper of the Year

The following players have won the Serie A Goalkeeper of the Year award whilst playing for Inter Milan:
- 2024 – (Switzerland) Yann Sommer
- 2019 – (Slovenia) Samir Handanović
- 2013 – (Slovenia) Samir Handanović
- 2010 – (Brazil) Júlio César
- 2009 – (Brazil) Júlio César

Serie A Most Valuable Player

The following players have won the Serie A Award for most valuable player whilst playing for Inter Milan:
- 2025–26 – (Italy) Federico Dimarco
- 2023–24 – (Argentina) Lautaro Martínez
- 2020–21 – (Belgium) Romelu Lukaku

Serie A Best Defender

The following players have won the Serie A Award for best defender whilst playing for Inter Milan:
- 2024–25 – (Italy) Alessandro Bastoni
- 2023–24 – (Italy) Alessandro Bastoni
- 2019–20 – (Netherlands) Stefan de Vrij

Serie A Best Midfielder

The following players have won the Serie A Award for best midfielder whilst playing for Inter Milan:
- 2023–24 – (Turkey) Hakan Çalhanoğlu
- 2022–23 – (Italy) Nicolò Barella
- 2021–22 – (Croatia) Marcelo Brozović
- 2020–21 – (Italy) Nicolò Barella

Serie A Best Striker

The following players have won the Serie A Award for best striker whilst playing for Inter Milan:
- 2025–26 – (Argentina) Lautaro Martínez

Serie A Most Valuable Coach

The following managers have won the Serie A Award for most valuable coach whilst managing Inter Milan:
- 2025–26 – (Romania) Cristian Chivu
- 2023–24 – (Italy) Simone Inzaghi

Serie A Coach of the Year

The following managers have won the Serie A Coach of the Year award whilst managing Inter Milan:
- 2024 – (Italy) Simone Inzaghi
- 2021 – (Italy) Antonio Conte
- 2010 – (Portugal) José Mourinho
- 2009 – (Portugal) José Mourinho

UEFA Europa League Player of the Season

The following players have won the UEFA Europa League Player of the Season whilst playing for Inter Milan:
- 2019–20 – (Belgium) Romelu Lukaku

=== Transfers ===
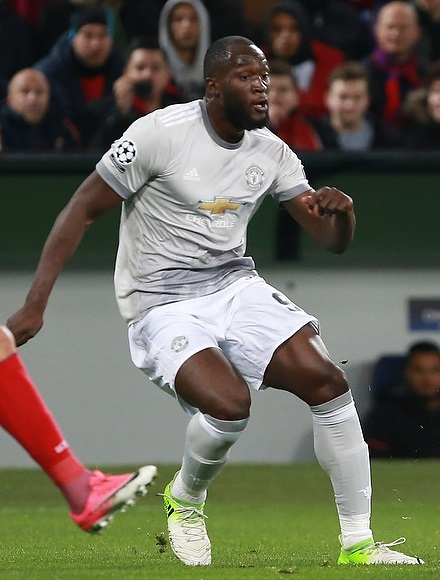
Romelu Lukaku (pictured in 2017), signed in August 2019 from Manchester United for €80 million, became Inter's most expensive purchase. He was then sold for a club-record fee of €115 million to Chelsea two years later.

==== Highest transfer fees paid ====
Inter Milan's record signings are Romelu Lukaku and Christian Vieri. Lukaku was signed from Manchester United for a reported fee of €65 million in August 2019. Vieri signed for the club from Lazio, for a fee which according to media reports is €49 million, in June 1999.

Rank	Player	From	Transfer fee	Date	Ref.
1	(Belgium) Romelu Lukaku	(England) Manchester United	€80m (Note: €10 million of Lukaku's cost was additional bonuses.)	August 2019	
2	(Italy) Christian Vieri	(Italy) Lazio	€49m	June 1999	
3	(Italy) Nicolò Barella	(Italy) Cagliari	€40.5m	September 2020	
4	(Morocco) Achraf Hakimi	(Spain) Real Madrid	€40m	July 2020	
4	(Portugal) João Mário	(Portugal) Sporting CP	€40m	August 2016	
6	(Belgium) Radja Nainggolan	(Italy) Roma	€38m	June 2018	
7	(Argentina) Hernán Crespo	(Italy) Lazio	€31.5m (Note: Hernán Crespo was actually purchased for €26 million fee + Bernardo Corradi. Lazio later re-valued Corradi to €5.5 million.)	August 2002	
8	(France) Geoffrey Kondogbia	(France) Monaco	€31m	June 2015	
9	(Brazil) Gabriel Barbosa	(Brazil) Santos	€29.5m	August 2016	
10	(Italy) Francesco Toldo	(Italy) Fiorentina	€28.5m	July 2001	

==== Highest transfer fees received ====
The club's record sale came on 12 August 2021, when they sold Romelu Lukaku to Chelsea for a fee of €115 million.

Rank	Player	To	Transfer fee	Date	Ref.
1	(Belgium) Romelu Lukaku	(England) Chelsea	€115m	August 2021	
2	(Sweden) Zlatan Ibrahimović	(Spain) Barcelona	€69m (Note: Initial transfer fee for Ibrahimović is indeterminable. Ibrahimović signed a 5-year contract, for €46 million and the exchange of Eto'o (valued at €20 million) and loan of Alexander Hleb (with an option to buy for a €10 million fee), with a €250 million release clause, making Ibrahimović worth €69 million. However, the Hleb deal collapsed. Eventually Ibrahimović cost Barcelona €69.884 million (£59 million), which included other fees. As per the Inter book the fee was €69.5 million, but part of the Inter fee (about 4.5%) was redistributed to youth clubs as solidarity contribution (except Juventus).)	July 2009	
3	(Morocco) Achraf Hakimi	(France) Paris Saint-Germain	€60m (Note: €11 million of additional bonuses linked to the achievement of certain objectives, reaching a potential €71 million transfer fee.)	July 2021	
4	(Argentina) Mauro Icardi	(France) Paris Saint-Germain	€58m (Note: €8 million of Icardi's fee was add-ons.)	May 2020	
5	(Cameroon) André Onana	(England) Manchester United	€52.5m (Note: €5 million of additional bonuses linked to the achievement of certain objectives, reaching a potential €57.5 million transfer fee.)	July 2023	
6	(Brazil) Ronaldo	(Spain) Real Madrid	€46m	August 2002	
7	(Croatia) Mateo Kovačić	(Spain) Real Madrid	€29m	August 2015	
8	(France) Geoffrey Kondogbia	(Spain) Valencia	€25m	May 2018	
9	(Cameroon) Samuel Eto'o	(Russia) Anzhi Makhachkala	€21.8m	August 2011	
9	(Italy) Mario Balotelli	(England) Manchester City	€21.8m	September 2010	

== World Cup winning players ==
The following World Cup winning players played at Inter Milan at some point during their career. Highlighted players played for Inter Milan while winning the World Cup. Relatedly, there has been an Inter Milan player in the FIFA World Cup final for every edition since 1982.

- Luigi Allemandi (Italy 1934)
- Armando Castellazzi (Italy 1934)
- Attilio Demaria (Italy 1934)
- Giovanni Ferrari (Italy 1934)
- Giuseppe Meazza (Italy 1934)
- (Italy) Carlo Ceresoli (France 1938)
- (Italy) Giovanni Ferrari (France 1938)
- (Italy) Pietro Ferraris (France 1938)
- (Italy) Ugo Locatelli (France 1938)
- (Italy) Giuseppe Meazza (France 1938)
- (Italy) Renato Olmi (France 1938)
- (Italy) Pietro Serantoni (France 1938)
- (Brazil) Jair da Costa (Chile 1962)
- Daniel Passarella (Argentina 1978)
- (Italy) Alessandro Altobelli (Spain 1982)
- (Italy) Giuseppe Bergomi (Spain 1982)
- (Italy) Ivano Bordon (Spain 1982)
- (Italy) Franco Causio (Spain 1982)
- (Italy) Giampiero Marini (Spain 1982)
- (Italy) Gabriele Oriali (Spain 1982)
- (Italy) Franco Selvaggi (Spain 1982)
- (Italy) Marco Tardelli (Spain 1982)
- (Italy) Fulvio Collovati (Spain 1982)
- (Argentina) Daniel Passarella (Mexico 1986)
- (Germany) Andreas Brehme (Italy 1990)
- (Germany) Jürgen Klinsmann (Italy 1990)
- (Germany) Lothar Matthäus (Italy 1990)
- (Brazil) Ronaldo (United States 1994)
- Laurent Blanc (France 1998)
- Youri Djorkaeff (France 1998)
- Patrick Vieira (France 1998)
- (Brazil) Lúcio (South Korea/Japan 2002)
- (Brazil) Roberto Carlos (South Korea/Japan 2002)
- (Brazil) Ronaldo (South Korea/Japan 2002)
- (Brazil) Vampeta (South Korea/Japan 2002)
- (Italy) Fabio Cannavaro (Germany 2006)
- (Italy) Fabio Grosso (Germany 2006)
- (Italy) Marco Materazzi (Germany 2006)
- (Italy) Angelo Peruzzi (Germany 2006)
- (Italy) Andrea Pirlo (Germany 2006)
- (Germany) Lukas Podolski (Brazil 2014)
- Benjamin Pavard (France 2018)
- (Argentina) Lautaro Martínez (Qatar 2022)
