= Preggo =

Preggo may refer to:

- Slang for a woman who is pregnant
- Pregnancy fetishism, contexts in which pregnancy is seen by individuals and cultures as an erotic phenomenon

== See also ==
- Prego (disambiguation)
