= Giuseppe Bergomi =

Italian footballer (born 1963)

Giuseppe Bergomi OMRI
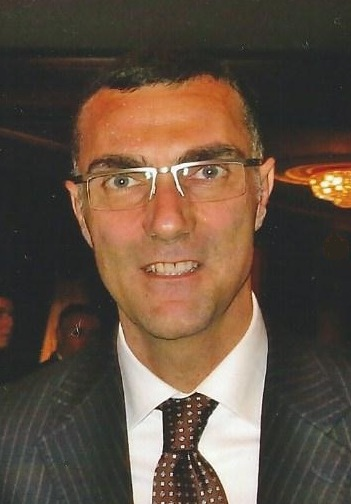
- Bergomi in 2008

Personal information
- Date of birth: 22 December 1963 (age 62)
- Place of birth: Milan, Italy
- Height: 1.84 m (6 ft 0 in)
- Position: Defender

Youth career
- 1977–1979: Inter Milan

Senior career*
Years	Team	Apps	(Gls)
1979–1999	Inter Milan	517	(24)

International career
1982–1984	Italy U21	4	(0)
1982–1998	Italy	81	(6)
Medal record
Men's football
Representing Italy
FIFA World Cup
Winner	1982 Spain
Third place	1990 Italy
UEFA European Championship
Third place	1988 West Germany
UEFA European Under-21 Championship
Third place	1984
- * Club domestic league appearances and goals

Giuseppe "Beppe" Bergomi OMRI (Italian pronunciation: [dʒuˈzɛppe ˈbɛppe ˈbɛrɡomi]; born 22 December 1963) is an Italian former professional footballer who spent his entire career at Inter Milan. He is regarded as one of the greatest Italian defenders of all time, and as one of the best of his generation, being elected by Pelé to be part of the FIFA 100 in 2004.

A one-club man, Bergomi held the record of most appearances for the club for several years, while also being the side's longtime captain. He was affectionately referred to as "Lo zio" ("the uncle") because of his bushy eyebrows and the impressive moustache he wore even as a youngster, which reminded teammate Gianpiero Marini of his own uncle's appearance.

Bergomi works as a pundit at Sky Sports Italia and frequently co-commentates on Serie A matches alongside Fabio Caressa.

== Club career ==
Born in Milan, Bergomi began training with Inter Milan's first team at the age of only 15, and made his professional debut at the age of 16, 1 month and 8 days in the 1979–80 Coppa Italia against rivals Juventus in Turin, on 30 January 1980, becoming the youngest to make it in the history of the club. During the 1980–81 season, at the age of 17, he made his first Serie A appearance in a 2–1 home win over Como on 22 February 1981. After winning the Coppa Italia the following year, also reaching the semifinals of the European Cup whilst putting on consistent performances, he soon was part of Italy's senior squad choices.

Bergomi would go on to spend his entire career with Inter, later becoming team captain. The twenty Serie A campaigns in which he competed were often in the shadow of A.C. Milan, as he only won the Scudetto once, during a record-breaking campaign in 1988–89; he did, however, conquer the UEFA Cup on three occasions (1990–91, 1993–94, and 1997–98, also reaching the final for a fourth time in 1997). For a time, he held the records for both the most appearances in European competition by an Italian player and the most Milan derbies played, both later broken by Paolo Maldini.

Bergomi retired in 1999 at the age of almost 36, holding the record of most appearances for Inter (758) until late September 2011, when he was overtaken by Javier Zanetti. He also scored 28 goals for the club. With 96 appearances, he currently holds the record for most appearances in the UEFA Cup. In total, he made 117 appearances in UEFA club competitions, without scoring a goal. In March 2004 he was named by Pelé as one of the top 125 greatest living footballers.

== International career ==
With Italy Bergomi won the 1982 FIFA World Cup. He also played in the 1986 and 1990 campaigns (acting as captain in the latter), as well as UEFA Euro 1988, with the nation reaching the semi-finals of the latter two tournaments. His final international tournament was the 1998 World Cup.

Alongside the likes of Inter's Giuseppe Baresi, his younger brother Franco of A.C. Milan and Juventus trio of Antonio Cabrini, Claudio Gentile and Gaetano Scirea, he formed the backbone of the national team's defence for much of the 1980s, making his debut on 14 April 1982 in a 0–1 friendly loss in East Germany, aged only 18 years and 3 months, making him the youngest player to feature in a match for Italy post-World War II. He was included in the Italy team for the World Cup in Spain later that year, becoming the youngest Italian player ever to be called up for a World Cup. In the victorious tournament, he appeared in three games, including Italy's 3–2 second round victory against Brazil in their final group match, where he put in a strong performance after coming on for the injured defender Fulvio Collovati, marking opposing striker Serginho Chulapa, despite later deflecting Paulo Roberto Falcão's shot into his own net; the result allowed Italy to advance to the semi-final ahead of Brazil and Argentina in the so-called "Group of Death." At the age of 18 years and 195 days, Bergomi was the youngest Italian player ever to have appeared at a World Cup. Although he was initially not in manager Enzo Bearzot's plans to feature in the knock-out rounds, Bergomi also went on to play the full 180 minutes in the last two matches of the tournament. Due to Gentile's suspension ahead of the semi-final against Poland, coupled with an injury to goalkeeper Dino Zoff, which impeded him from taking goal kicks, Bergomi started the match, keeping a clean sheet in the 2–0 victory. An injury to playmaker Giancarlo Antognoni also allowed Bergomi to start in the 3–1 final victory over West Germany, where he effectively marked German forward Karl-Heinz Rummenigge, despite picking up a minor injury in the first half, and even participated in the lead-up to the second goal of the match, scored by Marco Tardelli. Aged 18 years and 201 days, at the time, he was the second youngest player ever to win the title, after Brazil's Pelé, who won the tournament at the age of 17 years and 249 days in 1958.

Bergomi also appeared in the 1986 edition of the tournament, where Italy were eliminated in the round-of-16 by eventual semi-finalists France following a 2–0 loss.

During the first match under Bearzot's successor, Azeglio Vicini, Bergomi scored his first two goals for Italy in a 2–0 friendly win against Greece in Bologna on 8 October 1986, becoming the first Italian defender to score a brace at international level; he also wore the captain's armband for the first time, following striker Alessandro Altobelli's substitution. On 20 February 1988, Bergomi was named Italy captain ahead of Italy's 4–1 friendly win over the USSR in Bari, a role he held for 33 games, until 1991. As captain, Bergomi was part of Italy's Euro 88 squad under Vicini, where the nation reached the semi-finals, before suffering a 2–0 defeat to the Soviet Union; Bergomi was elected part of the team of the tournament.

Bergomi went on to captain his country in the 1990 World Cup – held on home soil – to a third-place finish, playing in all seven matches, which included five consecutive wins and as many clean sheets, for a total of 518 minutes without conceding a goal, and the best defensive record overall in the history of the competition, conceding only two goals in total. Italy were eliminated in the semi-finals by defending champions Argentina on penalties, following a 1–1 draw, the only match that Italy did not win throughout the competition. Italy went on to win the bronze medal match 2–1 over England. Bergomi was named to the FIFA World Cup All-Star Team for his performances.

After being sent off in a 2–1 away defeat against Norway for the Euro 1992 qualifiers on 5 June 1991 (Vicini's second-last match as Italy coach), following a clash with Erik Pedersen and an ensuing altercation with Gøran Sørloth, resulting in a six-match ban, Bergomi spent years without being called up to the Azzurri; this was in part due to subsequent Italy manager Arrigo Sacchi's preference for a zonal rather than man-marking defensive system, following Italy's failure to qualify for UEFA Euro 1992.

However, Bergomi was surprisingly selected by Cesare Maldini for the 1998 World Cup at age 34, due to an injury to Ciro Ferrara, after playing 28 times in the league and leading the Nerazzurri to the UEFA Cup – his third and last edition of the tournament. After appearing in a pre-tournament friendly against Sweden, which ended in a 1–0 defeat, in France, Bergomi started off as a reserve, but was substituted in during the last group stage match against Austria, when Alessandro Nesta suffered a tournament-ending injury, with Italy winning the match 2–1. He partnered for the rest of the tournament with Fabio Cannavaro, Alessandro Costacurta and Maldini, playing three games in total, starting in the 1–0 win over Norway in the round of 16, and leading Italy to a quarter-final finish, where they would be eliminated by hosts and eventual champions France 4–3 on penalties on 3 July, following a goalless draw; this would be his 81st and final international appearance, to which he added six goals in total. At the time, he was Italy's fourth–most capped player of all time, alongside Franco Baresi and Tardelli.

Along with Gianluigi Buffon, Fabio Cannavaro, Paolo Maldini, and Gianni Rivera, Bergomi is one of only five Italian players to have appeared in four editions of the FIFA World Cup. However, despite playing in four editions of the tournament, Bergomi failed to make one single appearance in the qualifying stages.

== Player profile ==
=== Style of play ===
Bergomi was a versatile defender who played across the backline and adapted to multiple formations. Primarily a right-back, he also operated on the left as a central defender, and as a sweeper, at both the club and international levels.

As a full-back, he utilized his pace, stamina, and aerial ability to advance up the flank and support offensive plays, contributing crosses and distance shots with his right foot. Defensively, he initially functioned as a man-marking "stopper", before transitioning to a zonal marking system. His defensive style relied heavily on tackling accuracy and positional anticipation.

Despite having a strong temper and being a hard tackler − he was sent off 12 times in his career − Bergomi also distinguished himself by his fairness, professionalism and discipline, which made him well-respected among teammates, opponents and coaches; he was also regarded for his 'silent leadership' throughout his career. Because of his physical and tenacious playing style, in 2007, The Times placed him at number nine in their list of the 50 hardest football players in history.

Bergomi began his career as a forward before establishing himself as a defender. He was noted for his longevity and adaptability over the course of his playing career. As his role evolved, he increasingly played as a sweeper, where his experience, tactical awareness, positional sense, technique, composure in possession, and ability to play the ball out from defence became key attributes. These qualities enabled him to remain effective despite a gradual decline in pace later in his career.

=== Legacy ===
Bergomi is regarded as one of the greatest Italian defenders of all time, and as one of the best defenders of his generation, being elected by Pelé to be part of the FIFA 100 in 2004.

== Post-playing career ==
A licensed football coach, Bergomi became youth coach of the Esordienti at Inter in 2008. In July 2009 he was appointed youth coach of Allievi Nazionali (under-17) at Monza, being promoted as head of the Berretti under-19 team, in co-operation with Giuseppe Chieppa, one year later.

In July 2011, Bergomi left Monza to accept the same position at Atalanta. Additionally, he also worked as a football pundit and commentator for Italian satellite television Sky Italia, often commentating with Fabio Caressa, including in Italy's victorious run at the 2006 World Cup.

== Personal life ==
Bergomi is married to Daniela; they have two children: Andrea and Sara.

In May 2020, Bergomi revealed that he had recovered from COVID-19, after contracting it following its outbreak in Italy.

== Career statistics ==
=== Club ===
Appearances and goals by club, season and competition
Club	Season	Serie A		Domestic Cups (Note: Includes appearances in the Coppa Italia and Supercoppa Italiana)		Europe		Total	
Club	Season	Apps	Goals	Apps	Goals	Apps	Goals	Apps	Goals
Inter Milan	1979–80	0	0	1	0	–		1	0
Inter Milan	1980–81	12	0	–		4	0	16	0
Inter Milan	1981–82	24	2	10	2	4	0	38	4
Inter Milan	1982–83	27	1	9	1	6	0	42	2
Inter Milan	1983–84	25	0	5	0	5	0	35	0
Inter Milan	1984–85	29	2	9	0	10	0	48	2
Inter Milan	1985–86	30	5	6	0	10	0	46	5
Inter Milan	1986–87	28	2	9	0	8	0	45	2
Inter Milan	1987–88	28	1	9	0	5	0	42	1
Inter Milan	1988–89	32	1	8	0	6	0	46	1
Inter Milan	1989–90	32	2	5	0	2	0	39	2
Inter Milan	1990–91	30	3	4	1	12	0	46	4
Inter Milan	1991–92	29	0	6	0	2	0	37	0
Inter Milan	1992–93	31	2	6	0	–		37	2
Inter Milan	1993–94	31	0	4	0	12	0	47	0
Inter Milan	1994–95	32	2	7	1	2	0	41	3
Inter Milan	1995–96	27	0	5	0	1	0	33	0
Inter Milan	1996–97	19	0	7	0	10	0	36	0
Inter Milan	1997–98	28	0	5	0	9	0	42	0
Inter Milan	1998–99	23	1	5	0	9	0	37	1
Career total		517	24	120	5	117	0	754	29

=== International ===
Appearances and goals by national team and year
National team	Year	Apps	Goals
Italy	1982	6	0
Italy	1983	4	0
Italy	1984	9	0
Italy	1985	7	0
Italy	1986	8	2
Italy	1987	8	1
Italy	1988	11	2
Italy	1989	10	1
Italy	1990	12	0
Italy	1991	2	0
Italy	1998	4	0
Total		81	6

Scores and results list Italy's goal tally first, score column indicates score after each Bergomi goal.

List of international goals scored by Giuseppe Bergomi
No.	Date	Venue	Opponent	Score	Result	Competition	Ref.
1	8 October 1986	Stadio Renato Dall'Ara, Bologna, Italy	Greece	1–0	2–0	Friendly	
2	8 October 1986	Stadio Renato Dall'Ara, Bologna, Italy	Greece	2–0	2–0	Friendly	
3	24 January 1987	Stadio Atleti Azzurri d'Italia, Bergamo, Italy	Malta	2–0	5–0	UEFA Euro 1988 qualification	
4	20 February 1988	Stadio della Vittoria, Bari, Italy	Soviet Union	4–1	4–1	Friendly	
5	27 April 1988	Stade Josy Barthel, Luxembourg City, Luxembourg	Luxembourg	2–0	3–0	Friendly	
6	22 February 1989	Arena Garibaldi, Pisa, Italy	Denmark	1–0	1–0	Friendly	

== Honours ==
Inter Milan

- Serie A: 1988–89
- Coppa Italia: 1981–82
- Supercoppa Italiana: 1989
- UEFA Cup: 1990–91, 1993–94, 1997–98

Italy

- FIFA World Cup: 1982; Third Place: 1990

Individual

- UEFA European Championship Team of the Tournament: 1988
- Onze Mondial: 1989, 1990, 1991
- FIFA World Cup All-Star Team: 1990
- Pirata d'Oro (Inter Milan Player of the Year): 1990
- Premio Nazionale Carriera Esemplare "Gaetano Scirea": 1997
- FIFA 100: 2004
- Italian Football Hall of Fame: 2016
- Inter Milan Hall of Fame: 2020
- One Club Man Award: 2024

Orders

- 4th Class / Officer: Ufficiale Ordine al Merito della Repubblica Italiana: 1991
