= Daniel Viotto =

Argentinian news presenter & broadcaster

Daniel Viotto is an Argentine former news presenter of CNN en Español. In his last seasons working for the chain, he hosted the shows Encuentro con Daniel Viotto, and Nuestro Mundo.

Viotto studied journalism in Mendoza, Argentina. He joined CNN in 1997, and since covered many events such as the Kosovo War, the liberation of Augusto Pinochet in London, and the return of Cuban boy Elián González to his country.

Viotto left CNN in November 2010 at a time when the chain conducted deep changes in its programming. He said goodbye in an emotional moment at the end of his final program of Encuentro con Daniel Viotto.
