= Mauro Icardi =

Argentine footballer (born 1993)

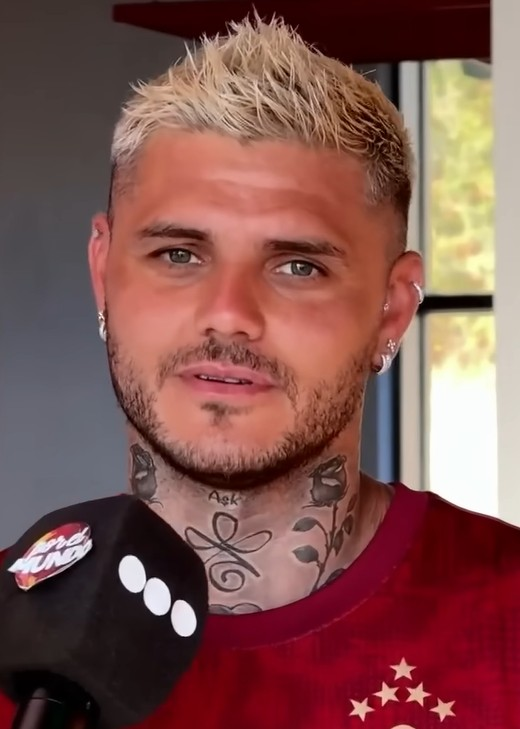
- Icardi with Galatasaray in 2025

Personal information
- Full name: Mauro Emanuel Icardi Rivero
- Date of birth: 19 February 1993 (age 33)
- Place of birth: Rosario, Argentina
- Height: 1.81 m (5 ft 11 in)
- Position: Striker

Youth career
- 1998–2002: CF Sarratea
- 2002–2008: Vecindario
- 2008–2011: Barcelona
- 2011–2012: Sampdoria

Senior career*
Years	Team	Apps	(Gls)
2011–2013	Sampdoria	33	(11)
2013–2020	Inter Milan	188	(111)
2019–2020	→ Paris Saint-Germain (loan)	20	(12)
2020–2023	Paris Saint-Germain	44	(11)
2022–2023	→ Galatasaray (loan)	24	(22)
2023–2026	Galatasaray	72	(43)

International career^{‡}
2012–2013	Argentina U20	5	(0)
2013–2018	Argentina	8	(1)
- * Club domestic league appearances and goals as of 28 June 2026 (UTC) ‡ National team caps and goals as of 17 March 2024 (UTC)

Mauro Emanuel Icardi Rivero (born 19 February 1993) is an Argentine professional footballer who plays as a striker. Currently he is free agent.

Icardi began his footballing career at the youth team of Vecindario in Gran Canaria, Spain, where he moved to from Argentina at the age of nine. He then passed through La Masia, the youth system of La Liga club Barcelona, before moving to Serie A club Sampdoria to begin his professional career in 2012. After an impressive season, he joined Inter Milan in July 2013, where he developed into one of the most prolific strikers in Europe. Icardi won the Capocannoniere in both the 2014–15 and 2017–18 seasons, (Note: Icardi's title as top scorer was shared with Luca Toni and Ciro Immobile, respectively.) receiving the Serie A Footballer of the Year in the latter season. He was named the captain of Inter in 2015, at age 22. Three years later, Icardi was integral to Inter reaching a place in the UEFA Champions League, their first time in six years. He is one of the club's highest goalscorers of all time.

In 2019, Icardi signed for Paris Saint-Germain on an initial one-year loan deal, where he won a domestic treble and helped the club finish as Champions League runners-up in his debut season. After joining PSG permanently for €50 million in May 2020, Icardi scored in the 2020 Trophée des Champions victory over rivals Marseille and opened the scoring in the club's win in the 2021 Coupe de France final. After a successful season on loan to Galatasaray in 2022 where he led the side to a Süper Lig title, Icardi joined permanently in 2023 for a €10 million fee. He won three more Süper Lig titles, as well as a Turkish Cup.

Icardi made his senior debut for Argentina in October 2013. He played sparingly until 2018, earning eight caps and scoring once.

== Early life ==
Icardi was born in Rosario, Argentina and moved to Canary Islands when he was nine. He is of partial Italian origin through his paternal ancestors named Icardi from Piedmont and Da Mezan from Venice. He has an Italian passport.

== Club career ==
=== Early career ===
Icardi began his football career with Vecindario in Gran Canaria, and scored over 50 goals in their youth categories.

In 2007, he was disputed over by Barcelona and Real Madrid, after offers from Valencia, Sevilla, Espanyol, Deportivo La Coruña, Arsenal and Liverpool. Barcelona won the race for Icardi, and signed with him until 2013.

==== FC Barcelona ====
Icardi joined the Catalan club at the start of 2008–09 season and was included on the U-17 team. He was promoted to the U-19 team the following season before joining Sampdoria on loan in January 2011. Icardi later stated that leaving Barcelona was not a bad decision, and that he was convinced that his decision was the right one.

=== Sampdoria ===
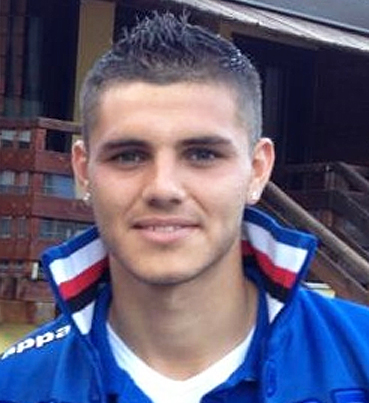
Icardi in Sampdoria colours, 2011

On 11 January 2011, Sampdoria confirmed Icardi had signed with the club on loan until the end of the season. After a successful six-month loan for la Samp, scoring 13 goals in 19 games with the Primavera team, the Italian side utilised the option to buy Icardi for €400,000 in July, signing a three-year deal. In 2011–12 season, he scored 19 goals in the reserve league Group A, as the joint-third topscorer of the league along with Gonzalo Barreto of Group C.

On 12 May 2012, he made his first-team debut, against Juve Stabia, after coming off the bench to replace Bruno Fornaroli in the 75th minute of the match. Ten minutes later, Icardi scored his first professional goal to win the match 2–1 for Sampdoria.

On 26 September, he made his Serie A debut for Sampdoria against Roma, substituting the Paraguayan midfielder Marcelo Estigarribia in the 49th minute. On 12 November, Icardi scored his first goal in Serie A in the Derby della Lanterna against Genoa in an eventual 3–1 win. On 6 January 2013, he scored two goals against Juventus in Sampdoria's 2–1 upset at Juventus Stadium. It was Juventus's second ever loss in the Juventus Stadium since the construction.

On 27 January, he scored four goals in a six-goal thrashing of fellow strugglers Pescara, lifting the Genoese side clear of the Serie A relegation zone. On 18 May, during the final match of 2012–13 season, Icardi scored again against Juventus, helping the team to beat the eventual champions of Italy 3–2 at Stadio Luigi Ferraris.

=== Inter Milan ===
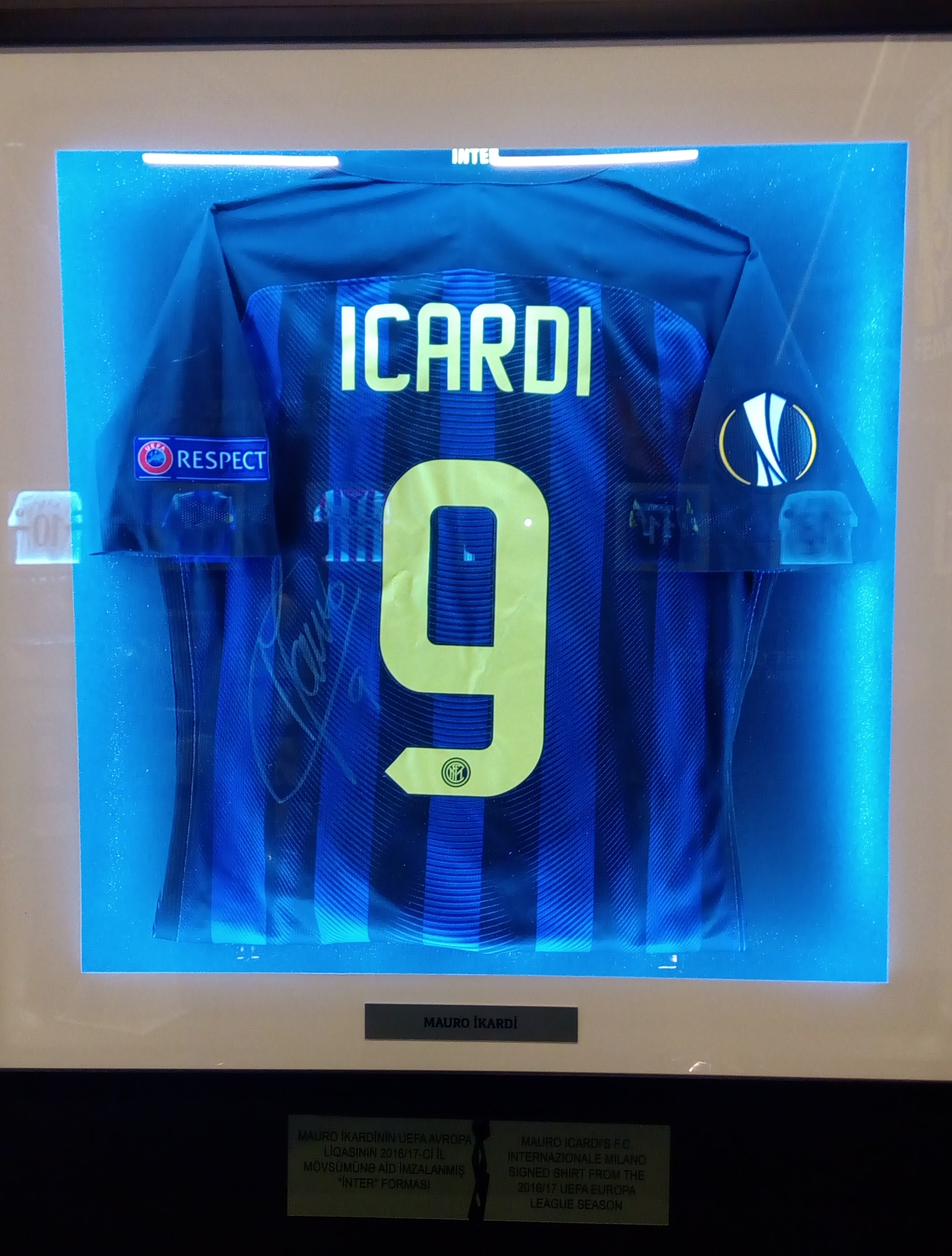
Icardi's Inter Milan shirt

In late April, it was announced that Icardi would join Inter Milan before the beginning of the 2013–14 season. The deal was also later confirmed by Sampdoria board. The transfer fee was €6.5 million for 50% registration rights. Icardi was officially unveiled as an Inter player on 16 July along with Algerian striker Ishak Belfodil, where he was allocated squad number 9. He said that moving to Inter is a "dream come true", adding that he "had a lot of offers, but wanted only Inter".

He made his unofficial debut one day later during the 3–0 away win against Trentino Select XI by playing in the first half of the 3–0 away win. He scored his first goal for Inter in their 1–1 pre-season friendly draw with Bundesliga club Hamburger SV, netting after less than two minutes on the field and being assisted by Fredy Guarín.

==== 2013–2015: Debut season and Capocannoniere ====
On 25 August, Icardi made his Inter official debut, coming on as a second-half substitute in a 2–0 home success over Genoa, hitting the crossbar late in the game; he scored his first league goal for the Nerazzurri on 14 September, netting the first of a 1–1 home draw against Juventus, after coming on as a substitute in the 73rd minute.

Due to injury, Icardi missed most of the games of the first part of the season, only returning to first-team matches in February. On 14 February 2014, during the away match against Fiorentina at Stadio Artemio Franchi, Icardi returned in the field after four months and scored the winner after only ten minutes. Later, on 5 April, Icardi scored a brace during the 2–2 home draw against Bologna. That was his first brace of his Inter career. This was followed by another brace during the 0–4 away win against his former side Sampdoria. Before the match, he was booed by the home fans, but he quieted them down by scoring in the 13th minute from a cross from Palacio, making a negative gesture which saw him booked.

On 10 May, in Javier Zanetti's last competitive match at the San Siro, in which Inter defeated Lazio 4–1 to secure a place in Europa League play-off for next season, Icardi scored the second goal of the match in the 37th minute after an assist from Kovačić and went to celebrate with Zanetti. He ended his first season with Nerazzurri with 23 matches in all competitions, including 22 in the league, scoring 9 goals in the process with an average of one goal in every 145 minutes.

On 10 June, Inter and Sampdoria reached the deal to terminate the co-ownership for another €6.5 million, making Inter was the sole employer of Icardi in the football field.

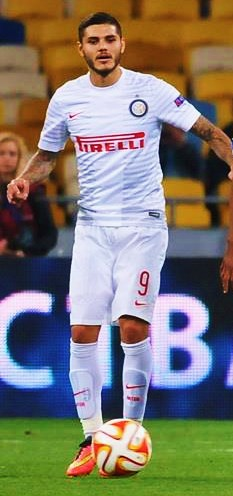
Icardi playing for Inter Milan in 2014

On 20 August, in Inter's first match of the season against Iceland's Stjarnan for first leg of play-off round of the 2014–15 Europa League, Icardi opened a 3–0 away win. That was his first European goal, in his European debut. In the returning leg, he came in as a second-half substitute and scored two times in a 6–0 win at the San Siro, to advance his team into the group stage 9–0 on aggregate.

During the second match of the league season on 14 September, he scored his second Serie A hat-trick in a 7–0 thrashing of Sassuolo. Ten days later, Icardi was injured and substituted in the 24th minute for Dani Osvaldo during the 2–0 home win against Atalanta. On 26 October, Icardi netted his first Serie A goal for over a month, the winner on a penalty kick against Cesena and giving Inter their first away win of the league. He was decisive again three days later, scoring a 90th-minute penalty kick won by Zdravko Kuzmanović in a 1–0 win against Sampdoria, giving his former side their first loss of 2014–15 season.

On 9 November, Icardi scored twice after two assists by Palacio during a 2–2 home draw against Hellas Verona. This draw caused the sacking of coach Walter Mazzarri, who was replaced with the returning Roberto Mancini. On 6 January of the following year, in the first match of the second part of the season, Icardi netted the only goal for his team during the 1–1 draw against Juventus at Juventus Stadium; the goal came in 64th minute after a pass from the Colombian midfielder Fredy Guarín. During that match, he had a conflict with his strike partner Osvaldo who was angry with him after Icardi decided to shoot instead of passing to his teammate who was in a better position to score. Due to this, Osvaldo left the team in the end of January. Five days later, Icardi was decisive in Inter's 3–1 home win against Genoa, scoring the second goal and earlier making an overhead kick (saved by goalkeeper) which was turned into an assist for Palacio.

In the match against Sassuolo, Inter lost 1–3 with Icardi scoring the only goal for his team after a mistake from the Sassuolo defence. After the match, he along with Guarín had a conflict with the fans at the Mapei Stadium. They went to throw their shirt to the fans who refused and threw them back at them, spewing insults at them. On 7 February, Icardi responded by scoring twice in a 3–0 home win against Palermo, refusing to celebrate in the process. After the match Icardi told to the media that the reason he did not celebrate was not the conflict with the fans but failing to find a way to renew his contract with the club directors. He was later criticized by Mancini for not celebrating.

On 11 April, he scored the first goal during the 0–3 away win against Verona, helping Inter get their first win after six consecutive matches. He scored twice on the final day in a 4–3 win over Empoli and finished the season as the joint Serie A top goalscorer with 22 goals with Verona's Luca Toni. Although Inter failed to qualify for European competition for the second time since 1999, Icardi's form attracted attention from abroad, however he signed a new four-year contract at the season's end.

==== 2015–2017: Captaincy and controversy ====
Before the start of 2015–16 season, it was announced that Icardi would be the new captain of Inter, replacing Andrea Ranocchia who lost his status after a poor 2014–15 season. In his first match as skipper, he was taken off after 15 minutes during the league win against Atalanta; Icardi was substituted for Stevan Jovetić, who scored the winning goal in the third minute of added time. After the examinations, it was announced that Icardi suffered a thigh injury and he missed the following league match against Carpi. He made his comeback on 13 September during the 1–0 home win against the cross-town rivals of Milan and opened his scoring account one week later against Chievo Verona, helping Inter to clinch the 4th consecutive victory. On 27 September, Icardi was again on the scoresheet but this time in a 1–4 defeat versus Fiorentina, who ended Inter's undefeated streak of the 2015–16 season.

One month later, on 28 October, following the 0–1 away win over Bologna where Icardi scored the only goal of the match following an assist from Adem Ljajić, he complained about lack of services to him, accusing his teammates in the process. Icardi told the media that: "In ten matches I've received four chances to score, and I've taken three. I think that is a good average." After that, he was benched for the following league match against Roma, where Inter won, again a 1–0 victory. After the game, coach Mancini said that leaving Icardi on the bench was a "tactical decision", adding that Icardi "must improve his game". He returned to the starting lineup in the next league match against Torino, where Inter grabbed another 1–0 victory.

On 22 November, in his 100th Serie A appearance, he scored in a 4–0 win over the minnows of Frosinone, helping Inter to seal its biggest victory of the season. On 13 December, Icardi netted his first brace of the season, in the 0–4 thrashing of Udinese, benefiting in both occasions from the mistakes of Udinese defenders. In Inter's final match of 2015, Icardi's goal was not enough to avoid the 2–1 home loss against Lazio, but still the team managed to end the year in the first place. At the end of the year, Icardi was ranked the 82nd best footballer in the world by the English newspaper The Guardian.

On 6 January 2016, Icardi finished Ivan Perišić's cross from close range for the only goal away against Empoli, putting Inter on top of Serie A. A month later, on 3 February, he scored his 50th Inter goal in all competitions in a 1–0 home win over Chievo, returning Inter to its winning ways after four consecutive matches. In February 2016, it was reported by several newspapers that Inter had rejected a €30 million bid from Manchester United to sign Icardi. On 9 April, he scored his 50th Serie A goal in a 1–0 away win over Frosinone, making his 100th Inter appearance in the process.

Icardi started the next season on 21 August by playing in the 2–0 away defeat to Chievo Verona in the opening league match, and scored his first goal of the season a week later during the 1–1 draw against Palermo at home. On 11 September, Icardi scored both goals, including a last-minute winner, as Inter overturn the score against newly promoted side Pescara for the first win of the season under the new coach Frank de Boer. One week later, in the Derby d'Italia match against Juventus, Icardi scored an equalizer in the 68th minute, and provided the Ivan Perišić goal ten minutes later, as Inter overturn the score again to beat the lifetime rivals for the first time in league since November 2012. It was Icardi's seventh goal in eight appearances against Juventus.

This was followed by a brace in Inter's 2–0 win at Empoli three days later, taking the lead of goalscorers table with six goals in six appearances; it was also the first time that he has scored in four consecutive Serie A matches.

On 7 October, Icardi signed a new contract extension with Inter until June 2021, with a buy-out clause of €110 million. With the new deal, Icardi will earn €4,5 million per season plus various bonuses based on his performances, goals and image rights. Shortly after signing the contract, Icardi stated: "I'm really happy to have signed this new contract that will keep me at the club until 2021. My dream is to win trophies with this team. I heard lots of things during the transfer window, as you always do, but the club was on my side. I have my agent and wife Wanda to thank for this renewal and we're all pleased at home."

Icardi scored a brace to beat Torino 2–1 at the San Siro, giving Inter their first win in their last 5 games. Then, he continued with his outrageous form, scoring back-to-back home braces against Crotone and Fiorentina. In the last match of 2016, Icardi scored another brace against Lazio to help Inter finish the year on a high. He finished the first part of the season with 14 goals and 5 assists, being the most efficient striker in the top 5 leagues, overtaking stars such Cristiano Ronaldo and Lionel Messi. The Guardian named him the world's 49th best player, winning 33 positions compared to last year ranking.

On 15 January 2017, in the 3–1 home win against Chievo which was the fifth consecutive win in league, Icardi scored his 15th league goal of the season becoming the first Inter player to score at least 15 goals in three consecutive seasons since Zlatan Ibrahimović and Christian Vieri. On 12 March, he scored a hat-trick against Atalanta, bringing his tally to 20 goals for the season. Icardi amassed 24 league goals in 34 appearances in the 2016–17 season, setting a new personal best. In Europa League, he scored twice in five matches as Inter finished last in Group K.

==== 2017–2019: Second Capocannoniere and departure ====
"He is the captain of Inter, and he is not your average kind of attacker. I have always told that he has the back bone like Ibrahimovic, because he wants the responsibility, he is a special kind of person and football player. A great guy and a great professional."

— Inter manager Luciano Spalletti, October 2017

Icardi missed much of the pre-season after getting injured in May. He was ready for the start of the season, however, scoring a brace inside 15 minutes in the opening matchday against Fiorentina as Inter won 3–0. He repeated the feat a week later at Roma, as Inter overturned the score to win 3–1, the first league win at Stadio Olimpico after nine years; the goals were Icardi's first at the Olimpico as well. On 10 September, Icardi scored with penalty kick against SPAL to record his 76th Serie A goal for Nerazzurri, entering in Inter's top 10 Serie A goalscorers.

Later on 15 October, Icardi scored all three goals as Inter defeated cross-town rivals Milan 3–2 to put Inter in second place. He became the first player to score a hat-trick in the Derby della Madonnina since Diego Milito in May 2012. Later on throughout the season, on 18 March 2018, Icardi scored four goals, including a 14-minute hat-trick, his 6th in Serie A, against his former club, Sampdoria, to give Inter a 5–0 win at the Stadio Luigi Ferraris. Furthermore, he broke the 100 goal mark in Serie A during the same match, taking his total tally to 103 Serie A goals in his 180th Serie A appearance, becoming the 6th youngest player ever to achieve this feat, at the age of 25 years and 27 days; his fourth goal of the match was also his 100th goal for Inter, in his 172nd appearance for the club.

On 22 April, Icardi scored a tap-in in the 2–1 away win versus Chievo which was his 26th league goal of the season, becoming the first Inter player since Angelillo in the 1958–59 season to achieve the feat. The next week, Icardi scored on Inter's dramatic 2–3 loss to Juventus, marking his 8th goal in 11 appearances against the Turin side.

In the final championship game away versus Lazio, Icardi won and converted a penalty kick to temporally level the score in an eventual 3–2 win. This win placed Inter fourth in championship tied on points with Lazio but ahead on head-to-head points, meaning the club had returned to Champions League for the first time since 2012. With 29 goals, Icardi won the Capocannoniere jointly with Lazio's Ciro Immobile, breaking his previous record of 24 goals set in the previous season; he also become the first Inter player to reach this tally since Antonio Angelillo during the 1958–59 season (33 goals).

Icardi began the new season in slow form, failing to score in the opening six championship matches. He also missed the away game against Bologna due to injury. Icardi played his first match in the UEFA Champions League on 18 September in Inter's opening Group B game against Tottenham Hotspur, netting a late equalizer with a 20-yard volley in an eventual 2–1 home win. His strike was named Champions League Goal of the Week. In the second game away at PSV Eindhoven, Icardi was on the score-sheet again by netting a tap-in after taking the ball around goalkeeper Jeroen Zoet to give Inter a second 2–1 comeback win. By doing so Icardi become the first Inter player since Adriano in 2004–05 season to score in each of his first two Champions League matches.

By scoring a brace in Inter's 2–1 win at SPAL, Icardi reached 103 Serie A goals by matching Christian Vieri tally as the seventh player with the most Serie A goals scored with Inter. In the first game following the international break, Icardi played and scored the game-winner against Milan to make it five league wins in a row for Inter, also scoring the club's 300th goal in the Derby della Madonnina.

Icardi made his 200th Serie A appearance on 24 November by playing in the last 13 minutes of a 3–0 home win over Frosinone. On 13 February 2019, because of several comments that Icardi's wife and agent, Wanda Nara, made about Inter's management and its players on the TV program Tiki Taka, Inter announced that he was to be replaced by Samir Handanović as club captain. In response to being stripped of the captaincy, Icardi refused to play in the club's UEFA Europa League match against Rapid Wien the following day.

He returned in action on 3 April in the league match against Genoa, 53 days since his last appearance; on his return, Icardi scored a penalty after being fouled inside the penalty area by Cristian Romero, who received a straight red card. In the second half, he also set up Ivan Perišić goal before making way for Keita Balde in 80th minute. With this goal, Icardi matched Christian Vieri as Inter's eighth all-time top goalscorer with 123 goals.

In July 2019, it was announced that Icardi would not travel on the club's pre-season tour. On 8 August 2019, the club signed Belgian striker Romelu Lukaku; the following day he was assigned the number 9 shirt that had been worn by Icardi since his arrival in 2013. To avoid potential legal complications, on 20 August Inter assigned Icardi with the number 7 shirt.

=== Paris Saint-Germain ===
==== 2019–20: Initial loan and first trophies ====
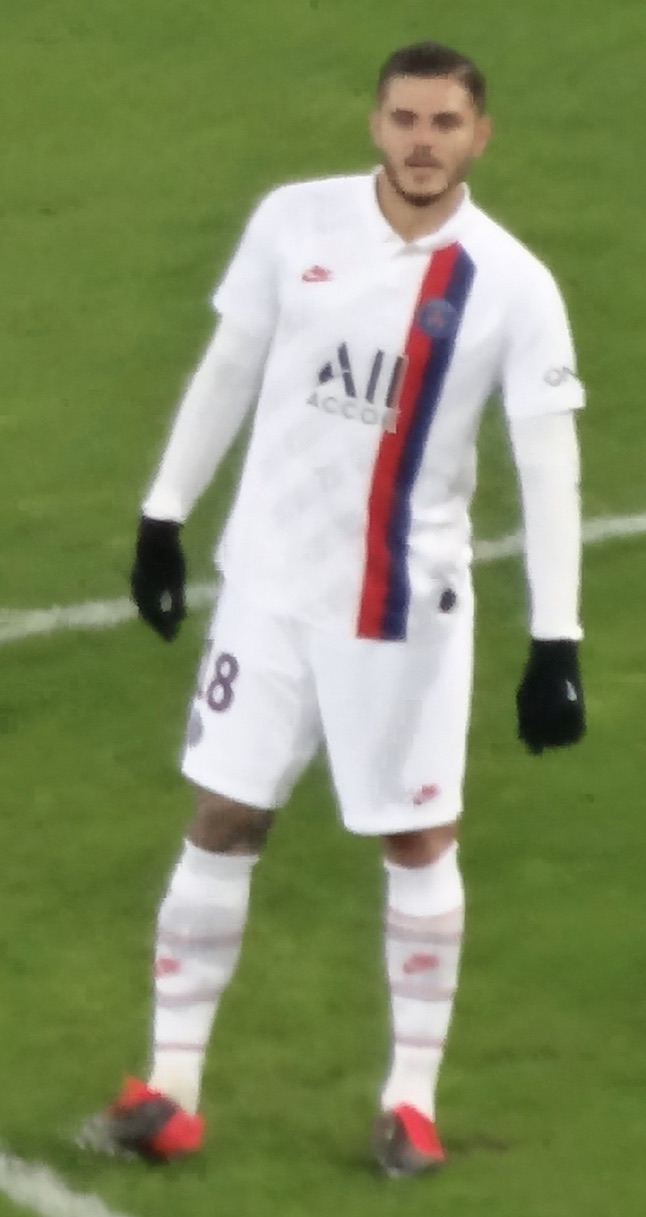
Icardi playing for Paris Saint-Germain in 2020

On 2 September 2019, Icardi joined French club Paris Saint-Germain on a one-season loan deal with a €70 million option to buy. He made his debut for PSG off the bench in their 1–0 win against Strasbourg on 14 September. On 1 October, he scored his first goal for the club in a 1–0 away win over Galatasaray, in the UEFA Champions League. On 5 October, he scored his first goal in Ligue 1 in a 4–0 home win over Angers. Icardi scored a brace against rivals Marseille on 27 October in a 4–0 win. He got his first hat-trick for the club on 8 January 2020, in a 6–1 Coupe de la Ligue win over Saint-Étienne.

On 1 May, Icardi won his first club trophy, as PSG were crowned Ligue 1 champions after the season had been called off amid the COVID-19 pandemic; at the time of the league's premature suspension, PSG were in first place, with a twelve–point lead over second–placed Marseille. On 31 May, Paris Saint-Germain and Inter Milan reached an agreement for Icardi's transfer, worth a reported €60 million. Icardi signed a four-year contract with PSG. After the season resumed in the summer, Icardi went onto win the Coupe de France, Coupe de la Ligue, and reached the UEFA Champions League final, in which he remained an unused substitute despite being the team's leading goalscorer in the tournament with 5 goals in 7 games, alongside Kylian Mbappé.

==== 2020–2022: Injury struggles and decline ====
Icardi missed the first two matches of the season, which were against Lens and Marseille, due to having tested positive for COVID-19. He made his return to action on 16 September 2020, in a 1–0 win against Metz, and scored his first two goals of the season in a 2–0 win against Reims on 27 September. In October, PSG manager Thomas Tuchel announced that Icardi had suffered an injury to the internal ligament of the knee.

Icardi's return to play came on 28 November, as he came on as a substitute in a 2–2 league draw against Bordeaux. Before the next match against Manchester United, he suffered a setback on his injury, and his time on the sidelines was extended. He had to wait until 9 January 2021 to make his return, coming on as a substitute in a 3–0 win against Brest; he would go on to score a goal himself and assist another for Pablo Sarabia. In the following match, which was against rivals Marseille in the Trophée des Champions, Icardi scored a goal and won a penalty, as PSG were victorious 2–1. He was awarded the man of the match trophy. On 19 May, Icardi opened the scoring for PSG in their 2–0 defeat of Monaco in the 2021 Coupe de France Final.

On 7 August 2021, Icardi scored his first goal of the 2021–22 season in a 2–1 league win over newly promoted Troyes. On 19 September, he scored the winning goal in stoppage time to hand PSG a 2–1 victory over Lyon. By the end of the season, Icardi had only scored five goals across all competitions, his lowest tally in a campaign since his debut season at Sampdoria.

Icardi began the 2022–23 season in Paris without participating in a match for PSG; however, he was named to the squad against Nantes for the Trophée des Champions. The decision was made by coach Galtier to keep Icardi out of PSG's squad list for the Champions League for the season.

=== Galatasaray ===
==== 2022–23: Turkish Footballer of the Year and league title ====
On 8 September 2022, Icardi signed a one-year loan contract with Turkish Süper Lig club Galatasaray. He was presented to thousands of fans when he landed at Atatürk Airport in the same night.

Icardi made his official debut for the side on 16 September, coming off the bench in a 2–1 win against Konyaspor. Notably, he played a significant role in the encounter against Alanyaspor on 23 October, where he netted his first league goal and contributed a pivotal outside-of-foot assist to Dries Mertens, ultimately helping them get a draw. Demonstrating his prowess, Icardi had another fine performance in a 7–0 triumph over İstanbul Başakşehir, recording one goal and two assists. Following a minor injury sustained towards the end of the 2022 FIFA World Cup, the Argentine footballer made an impressive comeback by scoring and assisting in the intercontinental derby against Fenerbahçe, within just fifteen minutes of play. His passion and determination quickly earned him a place in the hearts of the fans. During a match against Antalyaspor at the Nef Stadium, the song "Aşkın Olayım," which had been dedicated to Icardi for some time, was played, further solidifying his connection with the supporters.

On 14 April 2023, Icardi scored a hat-trick and recorded a further assist in a 6–0 win over Kayserispor. Following a 4–1 away victory against Ankaragücü on 30 May, in which Icardi scored a brace, Galatasaray secured the 2022–23 Süper Lig title. Icardi then scored in Galatasaray's reverse fixture against Fenerbahçe on 4 June, capping off a run of 13 goals in 9 matches. This also meant he had scored in all of the derby games he played in for his side (against Fenerbahçe and Beşiktaş). Icardi would conclude the league campaign with 22 goals and 7 assists.

==== 2023–24: Süper Lig top goalscorer and back-to-back league titles ====
On 28 July Galatasaray announced that Icardi had arrived in Istanbul to complete his permanent transfer to Turkey. On 30 July, he signed a three-year contract with the club. As per the agreement, Icardi would receive a salary of €6 million per year and a transfer fee of €10 million was paid to his former club Paris Saint-Germain.

On 23 August, Icardi scored the 200th goal of his club career, coming in his 375th match, in a 3–2 away win against Molde in the Champions League play-off round. On 3 October, he scored the winning goal against Manchester United, after missing a penalty, in a 3–2 victory at Old Trafford in the Champions League group stage, to secure Galatasaray's first ever competitive away win against an English side. On 21 October, Icardi surpassed Gala legend Gheorghe Hagi's tally of eight goals to become the foreign player with the most goals in derbies for Galatasaray, reaching ten. On 24 October, he scored a Panenka penalty against Bayern Munich in his side's 3–1 Champions League group stage home defeat.

On 26 May 2024, Icardi scored twice in a 3–1 away over Konyaspor, a result that clinched the Süper Lig title for the club with a league record 102 points. He also ended the season as the Süper Lig's top scorer with 25 goals.

==== 2024–26: Season ending-injury and departure ====
Icardi enjoyed a strong start to the 2024–25, scoring the club's first goal of the Süper Lig season during a comeback win against Hatayspor. His goal, a calmly taken penalty in the 80th minute, helped Galatasaray overturn a 1–0 defeat to win the match 2–1. On November 7, he suffered an anterior cruciate ligament (ACL) injury in his right knee during a 3–2 Europa League win against Tottenham Hotspur in Istanbul. Icardi went down in pain as he attempted to close down a pass from Tottenham goalkeeper Fraser Forster. The club has declared that he ruptured his ACL and damaged his meniscus and would undergo a "pre-operative rehabilitation" before an operation on his right knee. He was set to miss the rest of the season.

Coach Okan Buruk announced that Icardi would take over as Galatasaray team captain after Fernando Muslera's departure to Argentine club Estudiantes. On 15 August 2025, in the second match of the 2025–26 season, he returned to action after 281 days, scoring a goal in a 3–0 win over Fatih Karagümrük at Rams Park. On 13 December, in a Süper Lig match against Antalyaspor, Icardi scored in a 4–1 away victory, equaling Gheorghe Hagi's record for most Süper Lig goals scored by a foreign player in Galatasaray history.

On 4 February 2026, Icardi became the highest scoring foreign player in Galatasaray history. On 26 March, it was reported that Icardi sent a formal legal warning (ihtarnâme) to Galatasaray following an alleged non-payment of €4 million related to his image rights. Two days later, the club reported that the issue was resolved. On 9 May, Icardi provided the assist for Kaan Ayhan, who scored the final goal in the 4–2 victory over Antalyaspor, a match in which the team's 26th league title was secured. In June 2026, Icardi announced he would be departing Galatasaray.

After the expiration of his contract, Galatasaray announced on 15 July that it had parted ways with Icardi, ending his four season tenure in Turkey as a free agent. Some media outlets criticised Icardi labeling him as "one man walking soap opera", for his constant off pitch distractions, including a complex international legal battle over divorce, child support, and custody of his daughters, travel restrictions, litigation over unpaid rent in Istanbul, and intense media exposure alongside his current partner, actress China Suárez have buried his professional prospects, turning him into a high risk institutional asset for any club.

== International career ==
=== Youth ===
In April 2012, Icardi received a call-up from Italy under-19 squad to play in the friendly against England, but the player refused to accept the invitation as he wanted to play for Argentina. His wish was fulfilled on 26 July where he was summoned by Argentina under-20 coach Marcelo Trobbiani to play in the friendly against Germany, in which he made his debut on 14 August at Commerzbank-Arena, and the L'Alcúdia Tournament, held in Valencia, Spain.

Icardi scored his first goal with Argentina U20 on 19 August in a 2–0 win over Japan, which was followed by another two in the 2–1 win against Turkey three days later. The tournament ended in conquest, as Icardi was the top scorer with three goals.

=== Senior ===
Following Italy national football team manager Cesare Prandelli's interest in Icardi's performances, in February 2013, Icardi stated his wish to play for the Argentina senior team, despite also being eligible to play for Italy, saying: "I'm very grateful to Italian football for the opportunity it has given me, I'd also like to thank Prandelli for the nice words he expressed about me. But I have to be honest and sincere – I'm Argentine, I feel Argentine, and I've always dreamed of wearing the shirt of my nation. To actually do that would be the maximum for me."

On 15 October 2013, he played his first game for the main squad, coming on as an 82nd-minute substitute for Augusto Fernández in a 2–3 FIFA World Cup qualifier loss away to Uruguay.

In April 2016, Icardi was excluded from Gerardo Martino's preliminary squad for the Copa América Centenario, although the Argentine manager later named him to Argentina's preliminary under-23 squad for the 2016 Summer Olympics in Rio de Janeiro. However, Inter did not release Icardi to participate in the Olympics.

In October 2016, rumours started to speculate in Argentina that Lionel Messi was behind Icardi's exclusion from the national team due to Messi's friendship with Maxi López, Icardi's wife's former partner. The national team coach Edgardo Bauza stated that Icardi's off-field antics have nothing to do with him not being selected for Argentina and he would receive a call-up soon, adding that Messi does not "dictate" the team. However, he was omitted again for the 2018 FIFA World Cup qualification matches against Brazil and Colombia in November.

On 19 May 2017, Icardi received his first call-up after more than three years by newly appointed coach Jorge Sampaoli for the friendlies against Brazil and Singapore in June.

In May 2018, Icardi was named in Argentina's preliminary 35-man squad for the 2018 FIFA World Cup in Russia. Later that month, however, he was left out from the final 23.

Icardi scored his first senior international goal on 20 November 2018, in a 2–0 friendly home win over Mexico. His goal, scored after just 71 seconds, was the fourth quickest goal in Argentina history. In this match, he won the first trophy with the senior team - Copa Adidas 2018.

In May 2019, Icardi was included in Argentina manager Lionel Scaloni's preliminary 40-man squad for the 2019 Copa América. Later that month, however, he was excluded from the final 23-man squad for the tournament.

Throughout multiple periods, Icardi's form dipped and he was subsequently left out of Argentina's squad for the 2022 FIFA World Cup having failed to impress with Paris Saint-Germain or on loan with Galatasaray.

== Player profile ==
Nicknamed El niño del partido, Icardi is a quick, tactically intelligent, and physically strong striker, with good technique. Known for his excellent attacking movement, positioning, an eye for goal, he mainly operates in central areas inside the penalty box. An accurate and efficient finisher with his head and either foot inside the area, he is known for his ability to score from few touches, although he can also hold up the ball in order to create space or chances for other players, and play off of his teammates. Although he was once criticised for his limited creative and defensive contribution, as well as his lack of significant pace, stamina, power, and movement outside the box, his work-rate has improved in recent seasons, and has seen him drift out to wide positions in order to create space or provide assists for teammates. Long regarded as a talented and promising prospect, in 2013, Don Balón listed him as one of the top 100 young players born after 1992.

Speaking of Icardi, Inter coach Stefano Pioli stated that Icardi "is an animal in the box", and "always finding the right position", while the 1982 FIFA World Cup winner Paolo Rossi described Icardi as a "deadly striker", adding that "even in the most complicated games he can create the right opportunity and take advantage of it." Inter manager Luciano Spalletti called him "a complete striker" adding that "for his age shoulders so much responsibility". In an interview in January 2015, Icardi said his role model is Gabriel Batistuta, but during his time at Barcelona, he added that the forward he mostly resembled was Samuel Eto'o.

== Media and sponsorship ==
Icardi features on the cover of the Italian version of EA Sports' FIFA 16, alongside global cover star and compatriot Lionel Messi.

Mauro Icardi has maintained a long-standing endorsement relationship with the American sportswear giant Nike. He first signed with the brand in 2013, during his early years at Inter Milan. In December 2018, Icardi extended his partnership with Nike by signing a significant long-term deal reported to last nine years, securing the relationship until 2027. This renewal was seen as a strategic move by Nike to retain one of the top goal-scorers in European football, particularly at a time when Icardi was Inter's captain and a prominent figure in Serie A. As part of the sponsorship, Icardi has consistently worn Nike football boots and appeared in various promotional campaigns. The deal further solidified his position as one of Nike's key football ambassadors, especially in the Latin American and European markets.

In December 2023, Icardi and his then-wife, Wanda Nara, became ambassadors for Zen Pırlanta, a leading Turkish diamond jewelry brand. They appeared together in high-profile advertising campaigns, gaining attention in Turkey and enhancing Icardi's presence in the luxury market.

== Personal life ==
Icardi married Argentine media personality Wanda Nara in 2014. Nara was married to Icardi's former Sampdoria teammate Maxi López, but the couple broke up after her extramarital affair with Icardi was exposed. Nara and López began divorce proceedings in December 2013. Nara and Icardi married on 27 May, not long after her divorce from López was finalised, in a small ceremony in Buenos Aires. Icardi and Nara have two daughters: Francesca, born on 19 January 2015, and Isabella, born on 27 October 2016. Both were born in Milan.

Icardi's marriage to Nara provoked animosity against him in Argentina, making him a regular target in Argentinian tabloids. It was argued the animosity towards him was an important factor against Icardi being called to the national team. Prospective calls were heavily criticized by sporting figures, including Diego Maradona, who had an infamous social media exchanges with Icardi regarding his marriage to Nara in 2017. During an April 2014 Serie A match between Sampdoria and Inter, López notably refused to shake Icardi's hand, leading Argentinian press to dub games between the pair as the "Wanda derby". Two years later, López again refused to shake Icardi's hand during a Serie A match against Torino.

On 6 December 2015, Icardi was robbed of his €39,000 Hublot watch after Inter's 1–0 home win over Genoa. On 11 October 2016, the release of Icardi's autobiography, Sempre Avanti (Always Forward), caused controversy for a passage offending some Inter fans, leading to a banner being displayed at games calling for Icardi to leave the club. Icardi was fined by Inter and the passage was removed from subsequent editions of the book.

As of 2026, Icardi lives in Istanbul with Argentine model and actress María Eugenia Suárez and her three children. In March 2026, Icardi was implicated in legal proceedings concerning €416,000 worth of unpaid rent and damage to the couple's villa in Istanbul.

=== Divorce from Wanda Nara ===
In October 2021, Icardi was publicly accused by Nara of having an affair with María Eugenia Suárez, stating she discovered explicit messages between the pair on his phone. Icardi and Nara officially separated in July 2024, and he initiated divorce proceedings that November in Italy. Icardi and Nara's divorce included lengthy legal proceedings due to disputes over financial support, custody of their two daughters, and allegations of physical abuse against Icardi by Nara: Nara, who previously served as Icardi's agent, requested €500,000 per month in support.

As of March 2026, the couple's divorce proceedings were ongoing in Milan, after legal separation was ordered one year prior. Icardi was criticized by the Argentinian press during the divorce after it was reported that the Buenos Aires government incurred ARG$3,200,000 (€2,000.18) in additional public costs during the 2025 Argentinian economic crisis for conducting a judicial operation at the Chateau Libertador building, due to Icardi allegedly preventing officers from entering the building. In response, during an interview on 14 March 2026, Icardi stated that he had requested the divorce from Nara, complied with all legal requirements in Italy and Argentina, and criticized Argentinian media for misrepresenting the situation, specifically targeting journalist and presenter Yanina Latorre.

On 27 March, Buenos Aires Judge Adrián Hagopian imposed daily fines of ARG$5 million (€3,125.27) on Icardi for violating court orders regarding his daughters' school attendance, with Icardi's defense alleging bias from Hagopian and requesting his recusal. During this, it was revealed that Icardi has an outstanding child support debt of approximately €134,308. Following an escalation in the legal dispute, the Milan Court of Appeal issued a major financial ruling on 27 July 2026, completely dismissing Nara's modified demands. According to public statements from Icardi verified by standard sports coverage on The Sun, the Italian court declared Nara's appeal inadmissible due to her independent wealth, officially striking down her requests for a €250,000 monthly personal allowance, €65,000 monthly for each daughter, and a €100,000 monthly divorce settlement. Despite these interim rulings, the permanent alimony and final division of assets remain unresolved until after the European judicial recess (feria judicial), at Tribunale di Milano resumes and determines a required multimillion-dollar asset verification. Under Italian Civil Law, this will be executed via a Technical Office Consultation (Consulenza Tecnica d'Ufficio or CTU) audit. Due to the high net worth of the parties and the complexity of evaluating their shared international real estate, corporate holdings, and sports contracts, this comprehensive CTU audit is projected to take between 5 and 8 years before a final financial judgment is entered.

=== Custody battle ===
The international custody battle intensified days later in the Civil Court of Milan (Corte di Milano). Following a burglary at Nara's villa in Galliate where the daughters' passports were stolen, Icardi refused to authorize the issuance of new travel documents. Nara accused Icardi of obstructionism meant to block the children from returning to Argentina. In response, Icardi requested international restitution of the minors, arguing they had been unlawfully removed from Europe and asserting that the Milan court lacked jurisdiction. On 30 July 2026, Guardianship Judge Cristina Bassi ruled against Icardi, granting Nara sole authorization to bypass his consent and sign for the new passports. The Italian court rejected Icardi's international restitution claim. The court noted that he did not hold an active professional contract in Italy or Turkey to justify a European center of life, determining that the daughters' habitual residence was permanently established in Buenos Aires, Argentina. The judge ordered Icardi to pay a €3,000 legal penalty for his unsubstantiated refusal to sign the documents. As a consequence, an Argentinian judge issued an urgent travel ban blocking Mauro Icardi from leaving the country after he traveled to Buenos Aires to attend the 6th birthday party of his partner's son, child of actress China Suárez, and her former boyfriend Benjamín Vicuña. Seizing the opportunity, while Icardi was physically within Argentine jurisdiction, the family court intervened in protection of his biological daughter's legal rights to their personal passports and to return home to Argentina in order start the school year.

=== Istanbul property litigation ===
In June 2026, Icardi became involved in a high-profile real estate dispute in Istanbul, following his premature departure from a luxury villa in the Göktürk district. The property owner initiated legal action for roughly 8 million Turkish lira in unpaid rent and claimed significant structural damage to the residence he was sharing with model China Suárez. Following failed mediation, the case was accepted by the Istanbul Civil Court of Peace as Icardi refused to pay for the last four months in his contract.

=== Driving violation and license suspension ===
On 21 September 2026, the Ministry of Transportation of the Buenos Aires Province issued a preventive suspension of Icardi's driver's license following a widely publicized road safety violation. The incident escalated after his partner, Argentine actress China Suárez, published social media footage showing herself unbuckled and leaning half of her body out of the window of a moving vehicle driven by Icardi.

The Undersecretariat of Road Policy and Safety characterized the behavior as reckless and negligent, and upon reviewing the vehicle's documentation, provincial authorities discovered that Icardi was operating the vehicle with an Argentine license that had been expired since 2019. Consequently, the government mandated that Icardi undergo a comprehensive psychophysical evaluation to determine his psychological and physical aptitude before his driving privileges could be legally restored.

Rather than issuing an apology, Icardi publicly escalated the conflict on the social media platform X, using profanity to attack the Ministry of Transportation and accusing the government of exploiting his celebrity status for media attention. Deflecting responsibility for the safety infractions, Icardi challenged the legal jurisdiction of the provincial ban by claiming ownership of a valid Italian driving permit and directed the ministry to focus on infrastructure maintenance, demanding that they fix the local roads instead of posting updates online.

== Criminal Case ==
In November 2026, Argentine footballer Mauro Icardi became the subject of a criminal investigation in Argentina following allegations of physical violence against his 11 year old daughter, Francesca Icardi. According to police reports and media coverage, the incident occurred on November 6, 2026, at Icardi's residence in the La Isla gated community of Nordelta, when Francesca allegedly contacted her mother, Wanda Nara, via computer to report that she had been locked in a room and struck by her father. Responding officers from the Tigre Patrol Command interviewed the child at the scene who subsequently required medical attention from paramedics after giving her statement. Icardi declined to speak with responding officers, prompting the Tigre Gender Violence Prosecutor's Office, led by prosecutor Julio Petrucci, to open an investigation into suspected aggravated minor injuries.On November 7, Tigre's Guarantees Court No. 2 issued a 45 day restraining order prohibiting Icardi from approaching or contacting Francesca. Two days later, on November 8, Buenos Aires police executed a court ordered search of Icardi's Nordelta home, seizing an Apple MacBook, an iPhone 17 Pro, a school backpack, and a River Plate membership card for forensic examination. That same day, Guarantees Judge Orlando Abel Díaz granted Icardi an exemption from detention under sworn bail requiring him to formally appear before the court within five days while Icardi's defense team, represented by attorney Francisco Oneto, denied the allegations.

Following a dispute with her former partner Mauro Icardi in Nordelta and a subsequent complaint regarding alleged injuries, Argentine media personality and businesswoman Wanda Nara required medical attention after appearing at the Tigre prosecutor's office. According to footage broadcast by the América TV program LAM, Nara arrived at the location in a vehicle accompanied by her boyfriend Martín Migueles before exiting to enter a nearby ambulance for an on site evaluation by medical personnel. Reporters at the scene described Nara as visibly distressed following the earlier altercation with Icardi, while Migueles remained in the vehicle and signaled to journalists that she was stable without giving formal statements. No official medical report was immediately released detailing her condition or whether she required further hospital transfer.

== In Denying Assault, Mauro Icardi Implicates Himself and China Suárez ==
Former Galatasaray striker Mauro Icardi testified for more than an hour before Prosecutor Julio Petrucci at the Gender Based Violence Office in General Pacheco, Tigre, on November 12, 2026, denying allegations that he physically assaulted his 11 year old daughter. Following the hearing, Icardi departed the courthouse without speaking to the press. The investigation stems from a November 6 dispute at his Nordelta residence that prompted an emergency police response, a subsequent criminal complaint filed by the child's mother, Wanda Nara, and a November 8 police search to seize electronic devices. A Tigre court has also enacted a 45 day restraining order prohibiting Icardi from approaching or contacting his daughter while the probe is underway. During the proceedings, defense attorney Francisco Oneto characterized the incident as a verbal disagreement over social plans rather than a physical assault. Oneto submitted video recordings and medical evaluations indicating no new physical trauma, attributing a reported knee injury to a pre existing condition. However, in his own testimony, Icardi acknowledged that he entered his 11 year old daughter's locked bedroom through a balcony to film and question her while she was crying. He further admitted that he and his partner, María Eugenia Suárez, had the children call Licenciada Fernanda Matera, a court appointed psychologist from Argentina's Public Guardianship Ministry (Ministerio Público Tutelar) to deny that any physical abuse had occurred, while involving his 10 year old daughter to dispute her sister's account despite neither Suárez nor the younger child being present during the initial incident. Even in the absence of physical evidence of assault, legal experts note that Icardi's defense faces significant vulnerability under Argentine child protection and domestic violence statutes, specifically Articles 639 and 647 of the National Civil and Commercial Code alongside Laws 26.061, 26.485, and 12.569. Under these frameworks, his admissions of breaching his daughter's locked room via a balcony to record and interrogate her, as well as pitting her 10 year old sister against her in real time, can be construed as psychological mistreatment, coercion, and the improper triangulation of minors. Further complicating the defense,María Eugenia Suárez allegedly attempted to influence media coverage against TV host Wanda Nara today by circulating an edited video aimed at portraying herself in a favorable light. Simultaneously, a second witness has reportedly corroborated the 11 year old girl's allegations, stating that Suárez was overheard actively attempting to coach and coerce the younger daughter during the aftermath of the dispute.

== Career statistics ==
=== Club ===
As of match played 17 May 2026

Appearances and goals by club, season and competition
Club	Season	League			National cup (Note: Includes Coppa Italia, Coupe de France, Turkish Cup)		Europe		Other		Total	
Club	Season	Division	Apps	Goals	Apps	Goals	Apps	Goals	Apps	Goals	Apps	Goals
Sampdoria	2011–12	Serie B	2	1	0	0	—		—		2	1
Sampdoria	2012–13	Serie A	31	10	0	0	—		—		31	10
Sampdoria	Total		33	11	0	0	—		—		33	11
Inter Milan	2013–14	Serie A	22	9	1	0	—		—		23	9
Inter Milan	2014–15	Serie A	36	22	2	1	10 (Note: Appearances in UEFA Europa League)	4	—		48	27
Inter Milan	2015–16	Serie A	33	16	1	0	—		—		34	16
Inter Milan	2016–17	Serie A	34	24	2	0	5	2	—		41	26
Inter Milan	2017–18	Serie A	34	29	2	0	—		—		36	29
Inter Milan	2018–19	Serie A	29	11	2	2	6 (Note: Appearances in UEFA Champions League)	4	—		37	17
Inter Milan	Total		188	111	10	3	21	10	—		219	124
Paris Saint-Germain (loan)	2019–20	Ligue 1	20	12	4	0	7	5	3 (Note: Appearances in Coupe de la Ligue)	3	34	20
Paris Saint-Germain	2020–21	Ligue 1	20	7	4	5	3	0	1 (Note: Appearance in Trophée des Champions)	1	28	13
Paris Saint-Germain	2021–22	Ligue 1	24	4	2	1	3	0	1	0	30	5
Paris Saint-Germain	PSG total		64	23	10	6	13	5	5	4	92	38
Galatasaray (loan)	2022–23	Süper Lig	24	22	2	1	—		—		26	23
Galatasaray	2023–24	Süper Lig	34	25	0	0	12 (Note: Ten appearances and five goals in UEFA Champions League, two appearances and one goal in UEFA Europa League)	6	1 (Note: Appearance(s) in Turkish Super Cup)	1	47	32
Galatasaray	2024–25	Süper Lig	7	4	0	0	6 (Note: Two appearances in UEFA Champions League, four appearances and two goals in UEFA Europa League)	2	1	0	14	6
Galatasaray	2025–26	Süper Lig	31	14	4	1	10	0	2	1	47	16
Galatasaray	Galatasaray total		96	65	6	2	28	8	4	2	134	77
Career total			381	210	26	11	62	23	9	6	478	250

=== International ===
As of match played 20 November 2018

Appearances and goals by national team and year
National team	Year	Apps	Goals
Argentina	2013	1	0
Argentina	2014	0	0
Argentina	2015	0	0
Argentina	2016	0	0
Argentina	2017	3	0
Argentina	2018	4	1
Total		8	1

As of match played 20 November 2018
Argentina score listed first, score column indicates score after each Icardi goal.

List of international goals scored by Mauro Icardi
No.	Date	Venue	Cap	Opponent	Score	Result	Competition
1	20 November 2018	Estadio Malvinas Argentinas, Mendoza, Argentina	8	Mexico	1–0	2–0	Friendly

== Honours ==
Paris Saint-Germain

- Ligue 1: 2019–20, 2021–22
- Coupe de France: 2019–20, 2020–21
- Coupe de la Ligue: 2019–20
- Trophée des Champions: 2020, 2022

Galatasaray

- Süper Lig: 2022–23, 2023–24, 2024–25, 2025–26
- Turkish Cup: 2024–25
- Turkish Super Cup: 2023

Individual

- Capocannoniere: 2014–15, 2017–18
- Serie A Team of the Year: 2014–15, 2017–18
- Serie A Footballer of the Year: 2018
- Süper Lig Team of the Season: 2022–23
- Süper Lig Top Goalscorer: 2023–24
- Turkish Footballer of the Year: 2023

== Bibliography ==
- Paolo Fontanesi, Mauro Icardi, Sempre avanti. La mia storia segreta, Milan, Sperling & Kupfer, 2016, ISBN 88-20060-92-2 (Always forward. My secret life). (in Italian)

Sporting positions
Preceded by Andrea Ranocchia	Internazionale captain 2015–2018	Succeeded by Samir Handanović
Preceded by Fernando Muslera	Galatasaray captain 2025–2026	Succeeded by Abdülkerim Bardakcı
