= Carlos Sueldo =

Argentine physician and researcher

Personal details
- Born: Province of Buenos Aires, Argentina
- Education: Chicago Medical School; University of Southern California
- Alma mater: Universidad de Buenos Aires
- Profession: Physician, Professor, Researcher

Carlos Sueldo is a physician and professor of obstetrics and gynaecology (OB/GYN) for the University of California, San Francisco. Dr. Sueldo is also the founder (1984) and present Director of the in vitro fertilization IVF Fertility Center. Dr. Sueldo concurrently serves as the Scientific Director at the Center for Gynecology and Reproduction (CEGYR) in Buenos Aires, Argentina, and is a founding board member of the World Endometriosis Research Foundation.

Dr. Carlos Sueldo was born and raised in Buenos Aires, Argentina, where he completed Medical School at the University of Buenos Aires (UBA) and graduated in 1970. Dr. Sueldo completed an internship and residency in obstetrics and gynaecology in the department of OB/GYN at the Chicago Medical School in 1976. After two years as a junior faculty member in the same department, Professor Sueldo moved to California and joined the OB/GYN department at the University of California at San Francisco, as a clinical assistant, then associate, and as professor in 1994. He also completed a fellowship in reproductive endocrinology at the University of Southern California (1982–83).

As part of the American Society for Reproductive Medicine (ASRM), Dr. Sueldo is Chairman of The International Membership Committee, and Member of the International Advisory Committee. He is also a member of and frequent lead presenter and discussant at numerous other international reproductive societies, including the Argentine Society of Reproductive Medicine. Dr. Sueldo was also a lead researcher in developing the innovative virtual hysterosalpingography method, a non-invasive image-diagnostic procedure that offers valuable information as to the existence of causal anomalies of infertility.

Professor Carlos Sueldo is the recipient of numerous scientific awards and distinctions from around the world, and has also authored numerous articles in peer-reviewed reproductive medicine journals.

== Publications ==
- "Significance of ovarian macrophages in the follicular aspirates from ART patients" (Journal of Assisted Reproduction and Genetics, April 2007)
- "Virtual hysteroscopy by multidetector computed tomography" (Abdominal Imaging, 2007)
- "O-120:Virtual hysterosalpingography: A novel painless technique for the study of the female reproductive tract in infertile patients" (Fertility & Sterility)
- "Nuevas Observaciones de la fisiología Endometrial luego de la inyección transcervical de azul de Metileno" (Revista Reproduccion, August 2004)
- "Conceptos generales sobre mecanismos que causan infertilidad en pacientes con Endometriosis y el tratamiento de esta asociación" (Revista Reproduccion, December 2004)
- "In vitro fertilization: Simple or complex?" (with Luis Montero, Journal of Assisted Reproduction and Genetics, February 1988)
- "Implantation: Oocyte donation in humans: a model to study the effect of age on embryo implantation rate" (European Society of Human Reproduction and Embryology, 1994)
- "Exudative Ascites Produced by Pelvic inflammatory disease" (with Robert Wilson, Obstetrics & Gynecology, 1983)
- "Preliminary experience with a low-cost stimulation protocol that includes letrozole and human menopausal gonadotropins in normal responders for assisted reproductive technologies" (Fertility & Sterility)

== See also ==
- IVF
- Gynecology
- Infertility
