= Luján Fernández =

Argentine model (born 1980)

- Born: 12 March 1980 (age 46); Buenos Aires, Argentina
- Modeling information
- Height: 1.77 m (5 ft 9 1/2 in)
- Hair color: Light Brown
- Eye color: hazel
- Agency: The Fashion Model Management, Traffic, W Models Agency
- Website: www.instagram.com/dlujo

Luján Fernández (born 12 March 1980) is an Argentine model, perhaps best known for her three-year run in the Sports Illustrated Swimsuit Issue. She also worked for Victoria's Secret.

== Early life ==
Since childhood, Fernández was involved with several local television programs. She was a teenage TV star before becoming a model, when she was discovered at the age of 14 while on a Uruguayan beach. After consulting with her parents, she pursued a modeling career.

== Career ==
Fernández appeared on the covers of ELLE, GQ, Harper's Bazaar, as well as American, German, and French Vogue. The work kept coming and, like many foreign models before her, she decided to move to New York City.

Fernández hit the runway for the likes of Ralph Lauren, BCBG and John Bartlett, and has been featured in print campaigns for Perry Ellis, Chloé, Emanuel Ungaro, and XOXO, and appeared in the Victoria's Secret catalogs. She also appeared in the Sports Illustrated Swimsuit Issue from 1999 through 2001.

She ranked #66 in Maxim's 100 Sexiest Women in 2001. That same year, she appeared in Sports Illustrated Swimsuit Issue Collection of 2001.
