= Prego v. City of New York =

1988 HIV-related medical negligence lawsuit

Veronica Prego v. City of New York et al. was a $175 million negligence lawsuit filed in 1988 by a medical doctor, Verónica Prego, against the New York City Health and Hospitals Corporation, Dr. Joyce F. Fogel and Dr. Sheldon H. Landesman. Prego contracted HIV in 1983 when she was working at Kings County Hospital Center. In her lawsuit she contended that she was infected with the virus by pricking her finger on an infected needle at the hospital. According to Prego the needle was improperly disposed of by Dr. Fogel after being used on an AIDS patient. The defense contended that Dr. Prego had drawn the infected blood herself and had caused the accident on her own.

In March 1990, just before summations to the jury would have been held, she suddenly dropped her lawsuit, settling out-of-court without a public acknowledgement of negligence from the defendants and for what was initially an undisclosed sum of money. The judge later disclosed that $1.35 million was awarded to Prego in the settlement.

== Impact ==
The same year Prego contracted HIV, the Centers for Disease Control and Prevention announced that HIV was transmitted by blood and cautioned hospitals to implement precautionary measures to protect employees from exposure to blood. Prego's case focussed public attention to the issue, and continues to be mentioned in reference works that deal with hospital safety and AIDS in the workplace related issues.
