= Felix Pogliano =

Argentine-American member of the United Mine Workers of America

- Born: July 31, 1888; Colonia Carolina, Argentina
- Occupations: Coal miner, union leader
- Known for: Secretary-Treasurer of District 15, United Mine Workers of America; Colorado coal strikes

Felix Pogliano (born July 31, 1888) was an Argentine-American member of the United Mine Workers of America, who served as the Secretary and Treasurer of the union's 15th district based in Colorado.

== Background ==
Born in Colonia Carolina, Argentina on July 31, 1888, Pogliano immigrated to the United States in 1894 after spending four years in Italy. With his father serving as a miller and a miner, the family settled in Fremont County, Colorado, where Felix attended primary school in the coal camps. At the age of 11 Pogliano began work as a trapper boy in the coal mines and joined the United Mine Workers of America as a twelve-year-old. By 1903 Pogliano had assumed the office of secretary for a local union; a position he would hold for more than ten years. In 1920, he landed the most influential role of his career when he became the Secretary and Treasurer of the District 15 sector of the United Mine Workers of America in Colorado. Here, he would do the majority of his work known to the public, contributing numerous articles to the United Mine Workers Journal while acting as a correspondent for the coal strikes that took place in District 15 during 1921–1922. Shortly after the Ludlow Massacre in 1914, Pogliano was arrested during ongoing protests of the Colorado Coal Strike of 1913-1914, one of the most violent strikes in U.S. history, but was acquitted along with six others after a seven-week trial. Pogliano would go on to enlist in the U.S. Army from 1917 to 1919, where he spent 11 months overseas. Pogliano's other affiliations included membership to the American Legion and his identification as an Independent Democrat.

== Contributions ==
During his time as Secretary and Treasurer of District 15, Pogliano made several contributions to the United Mine Workers Journal concerning relevant events that took place as part of the Colorado Coal Strike of 1921-1922. In the first of these correspondences with the journal, Pogliano describes the scene of the southern part of the coal strike in 1921. In a letter to the journal, Pogliano speaks of the forced attempt to cut workers wages by the Colorado Fuel and Iron Company, declaration of martial law by Colorado's Governor, and the intervention of State Rangers. Throughout the article, Pogliano catalogs what he deems as the lies told to the miners by the Colorado Fuel and Iron Company, which ranged from deceit concerning signed petitions issued by the company, to broken promises about the use of strikebreakers. Despite this constant persecution from authorities, Pogliano finishes the letter with the assurance that Colorado miners are refusing to budge and continue to protest for their rightful conditions.

The second of these correspondences acts as an update on the strike a few months after the first letter, in order to alert the journal's readers of the progress being made. Here, Pogliano states that over 11,000 mine workers have now joined the strike and are currently idle. The large number of these strikers have forced many of the mines in Colorado to close, while others remain only partially open. Although the article states that the Fuel and Iron Company have now resorted to scare tactics used before and during the strikes of 1913–14, it assures readers that they have not been detrimental to the cause. Pogliano finishes the update with a plea to the miners reading the letter not to go looking for work in Colorado, as it will only harm the progress already made and cause more trouble. In the last of these letters, Pogliano brings news of the victory for the strikers, as the coal companies of Colorado agreed to return wages to the original levels that existed before the strike. Acting as the conclusion to these strike correspondences for Pogliano, he relates that most miners have now returned to working and the strike is officially over. The agreement resulted in an increase of $2.30 for day miners in Colorado according to the article and represented a big victory for the union.
