= History of US Salernitana 1919 =

Italian football club history

The history of US Salernitana 1919, so renamed since 12 July 2012, officially started in 2011 as Salerno Calcio, following the collapse of Salernitana Calcio 1919 in Lega Pro Prima Divisione, based in Salerno, Campania. The previous incarnation of the club was founded in 1919 as Unione Sportiva Salernitana, changing its name to Salernitana Sport in 1978 and being refounded in 2005 with Salernitana Calcio 1919.

== From 1919 to today ==
=== Unione Sportiva Salernitana ===
Unione Sportiva Salernitana was founded on 19 June 1919 by Adalgiso Onesti, who initiated the merger of an older club using the same name; which itself was founded in 1911 by a merger of four local clubs; and Foot-Ball Club Salerno.

The club was known as Società Sportiva Salernitanaudax for a time during the 1920s.

=== Salernitana Sport ===
In 1978 the club was renamed Salernitana Sport. It can be argued that Salernitana's best period as a club was 1997–1999. In the 1997–98 season, Salernitana topped Serie B and gained their second promotion to Serie A (first was in 1947–48). A young Marco Di Vaio led the scoring charts with 21 goals. In the 1998–99 season, their first in Serie A after 50 years, Salernitana fought hard and were led by Cameroonian international Rigobert Song and Salvatore Fresi in defense, a young Gennaro Gattuso in midfield, and Marco Di Vaio and David Di Michele leading the attack. They recorded surprise wins against Inter, Juventus, Roma and Lazio. They finished 1 point shy of salvation and were relegated.

Since then, the club did not manage to return to the top flight, and was excluded from Serie B in 2005.

=== Salernitana Calcio 1919 ===
In the summer 2005 was established Salernitana Calcio 1919, a new club which started again from Serie C1. In 2008, Salernitana finally returned to Serie B as Serie C1/B champions, after mathematically securing the title on 27 April.

In the season 2009-10 the club was relegated to Lega Pro Prima Divisione with 6-point deduction for economic default.

In the summer 2011, it did not appeal against the exclusion of Covisoc and it is definitely excluded by the Italian football.

=== From Salerno Calcio to U.S. Salernitana 1919 ===
On 21 July 2011 the new club of Salerno Calcio was founded in the city by the company Morgenstern S.r.l.; however, they were forced to give up their Salernitana Calcio 1919 name for the present one.

The club in the 2011–12 season was immediately promoted to Lega Pro Seconda Divisione winning the Group G of Serie D.

On 12 July 2012 the club was renamed U.S. Salernitana 1919.

== Presidential history ==
Below is the complete presidential history of Salernitana, from when Adalgiso Onesti was first in place at the club in 1919 to 2011.

Name	Years
Adalgiso Onesti	1919–20
Renato De Crescenzo	1920–21
Settimio Mobilio; Raffaele Schiavone	1921–22
Settimio Mobilio	1922–23
Adalgiso Onesti	1923–24
Settimio Mobilio; Carmine Caiafa	1924–25
Antonio Conforti; Vittorio La Rocca	1927–28
Pasquale Pinto	1928–29
Luigi Conforti; Enrico Chiari	1929–30
Giovanni Negri; Enrico Chiari	1930–31
Enrico Chiari	1931–33
Riccardo Gambrosie	1933–34
Enrico Chiari	1934–36
Savino Mione	1936–37
Giuseppe Carpinelli	1937–40
Eugenio Saligeri-Zucchi	1940
Matteo Scaramella	1940–43

Name	Years
Felice Del Galdo	1944–45
Domenico Mattioli	1945–48
Marcantionio Ferro	1948–54
Roberto Spirito	1954–55
Michele Scarmella; Achille Lauro	1955–56
Carmine De Martino	1956–57
Giuseppe Tortorella	1957–58
Matteo Guariglia	1958–60
Leopoldo Fulgione	1960
Pasquale Gagliardi	1960–63
Antonio D'Amico; Michele Scozia	1963–64
Michele Scozia	1964–65
Michele Gagliardi	1965–67
Giuseppe Tedesco	1967–72
Americo Vessa; Alfredo Caiafa	1972–73
Americo Vessa; Giovanni Benvenuto; Cesare Trucillo	1973–74
Americo Vessa	1974–75

Name	Years
Pietro Esposito	1975–76
Pietro Esposito; Aldo Matera	1976–77
Enzo Paolillo; Giovanni Benvenuto	1977–78
Enzo Paolillo; Vincenzo Grieco	1978–79
Antonio Ventura; Federico De Piano; Vincenzo Grieco	1979–80
Filippo Troisi	1980–82
Antonio Scermino	1983
Arcangelo Japicca	1983–85
Augusto Strianese	1985–87
Giuseppe Soglia	1987–91
Franco Del Mese	1991–94
Aniello Aliberti	1994–05
Antonio Lombardi	2005–2011
Marco Mezzaroma	2011–

== Managerial history ==
Salernitana have had many managers and trainers running the team during their history, here is a chronological list of them from 1919 onwards.

Name	Nationality	Years
Vincenzo Giordano	(Italy)	1919
Raffaele Schiavone	(Italy)	1919–21
Toledo	(Italy)	1921–22
Ciminari	(Italy)	1922–23
Alfonso Guasco	(Italy)	1923–24
Willy Kargus	(Germany)	1924–25
Bellone	(Italy)	1925
Venturini	(Italy)	1927–28
Barone	(Italy)	1928
Finizio	(Italy)	1928–29
Apicella	(Italy)	1929
Géza Kertész	(Hungary)	1929–31
Luigi Leone	(Italy)	1931–32
Mora	(Italy)	1932
Ivo Fiorentini	(Italy)	1932–33
Walter Colombati	(Italy)	1933–34
Imre Schoffer	(Hungary)	1934–35
Buratti	(Italy)	1935
Armand Halmos	(Hungary)	1935–36
Ferenc Hirzer	(Italy)	1936–38
Francesco Hansel	(Czech Republic)	1938–39
Attila Sallustro	(Italy) (Paraguay)	1939
Béla Karoly	(Hungary)	1939–40
Ferenc Hirzer	(Hungary)	1940–41
Géza Kertész	(Hungary)	1941
Antonio Valese	(Italy)	1941
Giuseppe Viani	(Italy)	1941–43
Milite	(Italy)	1944
Antonio Valese	(Italy)	1944–45
Vittorio Mosele	(Italy)	1945
Ferenc Hirzer	(Italy)	1945
Giuseppe Viani	(Italy)	1945–47
Pietro Piselli	(Italy)	1948–50
Arnaldo Sentimenti	(Italy)	1950
Walter Crociani	(Italy)	1950–51
Rodolphe Hiden	(Austria)	1951–52
Carlo Ceresoli	(Italy)	1952–53
Enrico Carpitelli	(Italy)	1953–55
Saracino	(Italy)	1955
Antonio Valese	(Italy)	1955–56
Saracino	(Italy)	1956
Paolo Todeschini	(Italy)	1956–57
Enrico Carpitelli	(Italy)	1957
Giovanni Varglien	(Italy)	1957–58
Nicolò Nicolosi	(Italy)	1958–59
Vittorio Mosele	(Italy)	1959
István Mike Mayer	(Hungary)	1959
Pietro Piselli	(Italy)	1959–60
Ettore Puricelli	(Italy) (Uruguay)	1960–61
Di Gennaro	(Italy)	1961–62
Gyula Zsengellér	(Hungary)	1962
Piero Pasinati	(Italy)	1962–63
Giunchi	(Italy)	1963–64
Rodolphe Hiden	(Austria)	1964
Riccardo Carapellese	(Italy)	1964–65
Rodolphe Hiden	(Austria)	1965
Rosati	(Italy)	1965–66
Oscar Montez	(Argentina)	1967
Guido Settembrino	(Italy)	1967–69
Pietro Magni	(Italy)	1969
Sergio Piacentini	(Italy)	1969–70
Edi Gratton	(Italy)	1970
Rosati	(Italy)	1970–71
Giancarlo Vitali	(Italy)	1971–72
Nicola Chiricallo	(Italy)	1972–73

Name	Nationality	Years
Franco Viviani	(Italy)	1973–74
Ettore Recagni	(Italy)	1974–75
Giacomo Losi	(Italy)	1975
Guido Settembrino	(Italy)	1975
Massimo Giacomini	(Italy)	1975–76
Ottavio Bugatti	(Italy)	1976
Carlo Regalia	(Italy)	1976–77
Lucio Muiesan	(Italy)	1977
Carlo Facchin	(Italy)	1977
Enea Masiero	(Italy)	1977–78
Lucio Muiesan	(Italy)	1978
Rosati	(Italy)	1978–79
Franco Viviani	(Italy)	1979–80
Antonio Giammarinaro	(Italy)	1980
Gigante	(Italy)	1980
Lamberto Leonardi	(Italy)	1980–81
Antonio Giammarinaro	(Italy)	1981–82
Romano Mattè	(Italy)	1982
Francisco Lojacono	(Argentina)	1982–83
Marino Perani	(Italy)	1983
Mario Facco	(Italy)	1983–84
Gian Piero Ghio	(Italy)	1984–86
Giorgio Sereni	(Italy)	1986
Carmelo Russo	(Italy)	1986–87
Claudio Tobia	(Italy)	1987–88
Roberto Clagluna	(Italy)	1988
Carlo Soldo	(Italy)	1988
Giancarlo Pasinato	(Italy)	1988–89
Lamberto Leonardi	(Italy)	1989
Giancarlo Ansaloni	(Italy)	1989–91
Gianni Simonelli	(Italy)	1991–92
Tarcisio Burgnich	(Italy)	1992
Giuliano Sonzogni	(Italy)	1992–93
Delio Rossi	(Italy)	1993–95
Franco Colomba	(Italy)	1995–97
Franco Varrella	(Italy)	1997
Delio Rossi	(Italy)	1997–99
Francesco Oddo	(Italy)	1999
Adriano Cadregari	(Italy)	1999
Luigi Cagni	(Italy)	1999–00
Adriano Cadregari	(Italy)	2000
Francesco Oddo	(Italy)	2000–01
Nedo Sonetti	(Italy)	2001
Zdeněk Zeman	(Czech Republic)	2001–03
Franco Varrella	(Italy)	2003
Stefano Pioli	(Italy)	2003–04
Aldo Ammazzalorso	(Argentina)	2004–05
Angelo Gregucci	(Italy)	2005
Maurizio Costantini	(Italy)	2005–06
Stefano Cuoghi	(Italy)	2006
Raffaele Novelli	(Italy)	2006
Gianfranco Bellotto	(Italy)	2007
Andrea Agostinelli	(Italy)	2007–08
Fabio Brini	(Italy)	2008–
Bortolo Mutti	(Italy)	2008–
Fabrizio Castori	(Italy)	2008–09
Fabio Brini	(Italy)	2009
Marco Cari	(Italy)	2009
Gianluca Grassadonia	(Italy)	2009–10
Ersilio Cerone	(Italy)	2010
Roberto Breda	(Italy)	2010-11
Carlo Perrone	(Italy)	2011-2012
Giuseppe Galderisi	(Italy)	2012
Carlo Perrone	(Italy)	2012-
