= 1965–66 Inter Milan season =

Football Club Internazionale
1965–66 season
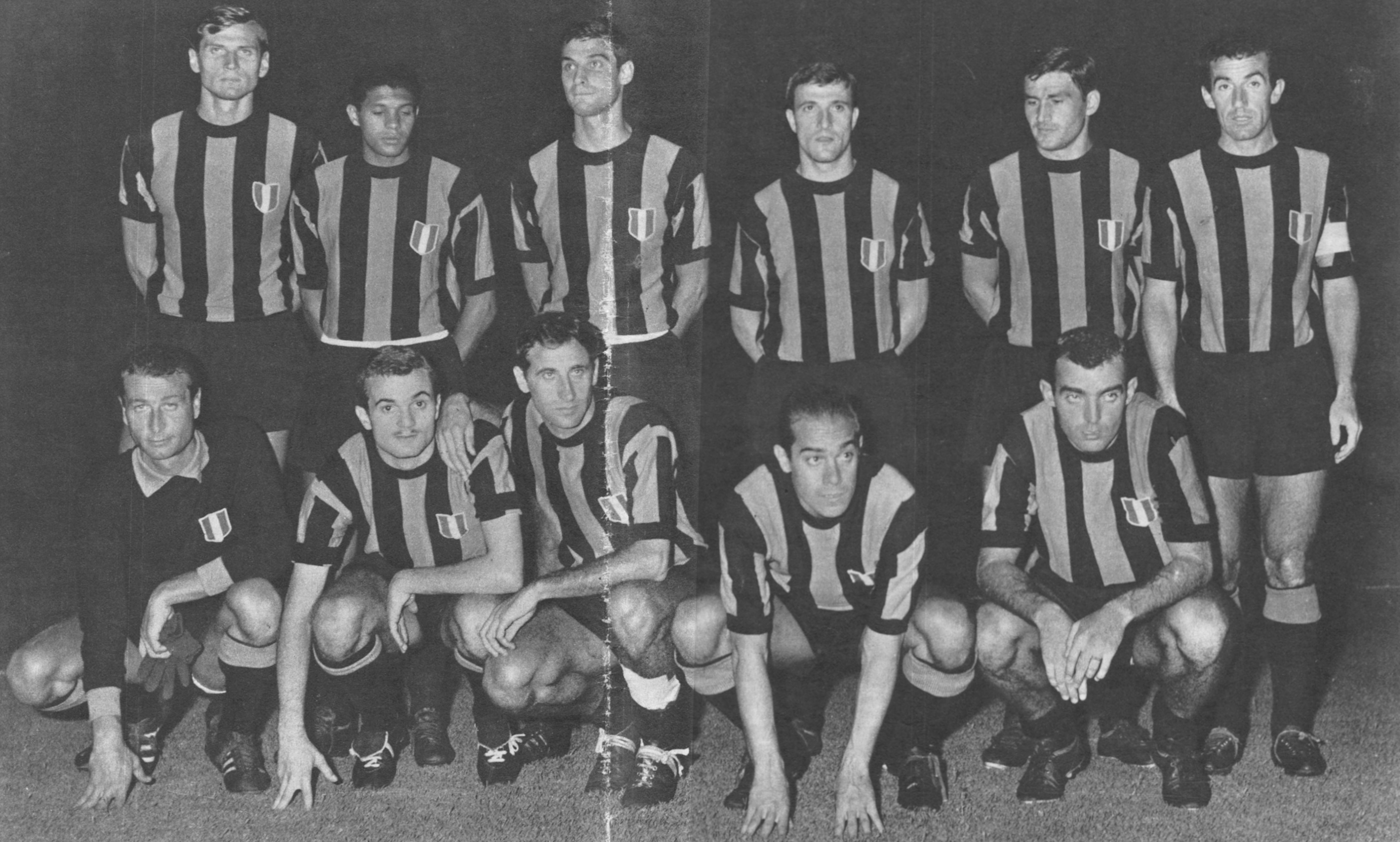
- Chairman: Angelo Moratti
- Manager: Helenio Herrera
- Stadium: San Siro
- Serie A: 1st in (European Cup)
- Coppa Italia: Semifinals
- European Cup: Semi-finals
- Intercontinental Cup: Winners
- Top goalscorer: League: Mazzola (19); All: Mazzola (20)
- Highest home attendance: 76,707 vs. Juventus (8 May 1966)
- Lowest home attendance: 25,590 vs. Vicenza (30 January 1966)
- Average home league attendance: 49759
Home colours	Away colours	Third colours

During 1965–66, Football Club Internazionale competed in Serie A, Coppa Italia and the European Cup.

== Summary ==
After winning the European Cup last season, the club made just a few transfers in to the team, such as young players Cordova and Facco, also Cappellini back to the squad. Manager Herrera confirmed Grande Inter, with a substantial change: defender Facchetti moved to the left back and made numerous contributions in attacking, notably his capacity to finish and scoring goals. Facchetti held the record for most goals in a single Serie A season by a defender, with ten goals scored during this season, until it was broken by Perugia's Marco Materazzi during the 2000–01 season.

The team also won the 1965 Intercontinental Cup against Independiente de Avellaneda. The first leg was held on 8 September at San Siro, and Inter won the match 3–0, with goals from Joaquín Peiró and Sandro Mazzola. La Doble Visera hosted the return leg seven days later on 15 September 1965, and ended in a goalless draw. Internazionale thus won the Intercontinental Cup for the second year in a row.

The title holders advanced to the semi-finals in European Cup, where lost to Real Madrid with a 1–3 score after two legs.

== Squad ==
Note: Flags indicate national team as defined under FIFA eligibility rules; some limited exceptions apply. Players may hold more than one non-FIFA nationality.

Pos.	Nation	Player
GK	ITA	Giuliano Sarti
GK	ITA	Ferdinando Miniussi
DF	ITA	Giacinto Facchetti
DF	ITA	Tarcisio Burgnich
DF	ITA	Armando Picchi
DF	ITA	Spartaco Landini
DF	ITA	Mario Facco
DF	ITA	Aristide Guarneri
DF	ITA	Giorgio Dellagiovanna
DF	ITA	Dante Lodrini
MF	ITA	Sandro Mazzola

Pos.	Nation	Player
MF	ITA	Mario Corso
MF	ESP	Luis Suárez
MF	ITA	Gianfranco Bedin
MF	ITA	Franco Cordova
MF	ITA	Sergio Gori
MF	ITA	Saul Malatrasi
FW	ITA	Angelo Domenghini
FW	BRA	Jair
FW	ITA	Renato Cappellini
FW	ITA	Francesco Canella
FW	ESP	Joaquín Peiró

=== Transfers ===
In
Pos.	Name	from	Type
GK	Ferdinando Miniussi	Varese	
DF	Mario Facco		
MF	Franco Cordova	Catania	
FW	Renato Cappellini	Genoa	

Out
Pos.	Name	To	Type
GK	Rosario Di Vincenzo	Varese	
DF	Giorgio Dellagiovanna	Varese	

== Competitions ==
=== Serie A ===
==== League table ====
Pos	Team	Pld	W	D	L	GF	GA	GD	Pts	Qualification or relegation
1	Internazionale (C)	34	20	10	4	70	28	+42	50	Qualification to European Cup
2	Bologna	34	19	8	7	60	37	+23	46	Chosen for Inter-Cities Fairs Cup
3	Napoli	34	17	11	6	44	27	+17	45	Chosen for Inter-Cities Fairs Cup
4	Fiorentina	34	16	11	7	45	22	+23	43	Qualification to Cup Winners' Cup
5	Juventus	34	13	16	5	38	23	+15	42	Chosen for Inter-Cities Fairs Cup

Source: Panini
(C) Champions

==== Results by round ====
Round	1	2	3	4	5	6	7	8	9	10	11	12	13	14	15	16	17	18	19	20	21	22	23	24	25	26	27	28	29	30	31	32	33	34
Ground	H	H	A	A	H	A	H	A	A	H	A	H	A	H	A	A	H	A	H	A	H	A	H	A	H	H	A	H	A	H	A	H	H	A
Result	W	W	L	D	W	W	W	D	W	D	W	D	W	D	D	W	D	W	W	W	D	L	W	W	W	W	W	W	D	D	L	W	W	L
Position	1	4	8	5	4	2	1	1	1	1	1	1	1	1	1	1	1	1	1	1	1	1	1	1	1	1	1	1	1	1	1	1	1	1

Source: Competitive matches
A = Away; H = Home; W = Win; D = Draw; L = Loss; = Leader, 1966-67 European Cup; = 1966–67 Inter-Cities Fairs Cup

==== Matches ====
4 September 1965 1	Inter Milan	5–2	Varese	Milan
	Corso 3' (pen.); Gori 12'; Domenghini 21'; Facchetti 39', 49'	Report	45' Bagatti; 87' Combin	Stadium: San Siro; Referee: Mario Bernardis

21 September 1965 3	Inter Milan	1–0	Atalanta	Milan
	Mazzola 41'	Report		Stadium: San Siro; Referee: Bruno De Marchi

26 September 1965 4	Roma	2–0	Inter Milan	Rome
	Benítez 62'; Barison 73'	Report		Stadium: Stadio Olimpico; Referee: Fabio Monti

29 September 1965 2	Vicenza	1–1	Inter Milan	Vicenza
	Maraschi 25'	Report	15' Mazzola	Stadium: Stadio Romeo Menti; Referee: Mario Bernardis

3 October 1965 5	Inter Milan	3–1	Catania	Milan
	Facchetti 59'; Bedin 65'; Mazzola 79' (pen.)	Report	64' Facchin	Stadium: San Siro; Referee: Giuliano Acernese

10 October 1965 6	Foggia	1–3	Inter Milan	Foggia
	Di Giovanni 79'	Report	42', 55' (pen.) Mazzola; 90' Corso	Stadium: Stadio Pino Zaccheria; Referee: Alessandro D'Agostini

17 October 1965 7	Inter Milan	4–0	Torino	Milan
15:00 UTC+1	Rosato 15' (o.g.); Mazzola 42', 63'; Domenghini 46'	Report		Stadium: San Siro; Attendance: 59 469; Referee: Concetto Lo Bello

24 October 1965 8	Brescia	2–2	Inter Milan	Brescia
	Landini 38' (o.g.); De Paoli 48'	Report	47' Domenghini; 71' Guarneri	Stadium: Stadio Mario Rigamonti; Referee: Aurelio Angonese

14 November 1965 9	Cagliari	0–1	Inter	Cagliari
		Report	69' Facchetti	Stadium: Stadio Amsicora; Referee: Alessandro D'Agostini

21 November 1965 10	Inter Milan	1–1	AC Milan	Milan
	Domenghini 31'	Report	56' Amarildo	Stadium: San Siro; Referee: Concetto Lo Bello

28 November 1965 11	SPAL	0–1	Inter Milan	Ferrara
		Report	75' Jair	Stadium: Stadio Paolo Mazza; Referee: Mario Bernardis

12 December 1965 12	Inter Milan	0–0	Fiorentina	Milan
		Report		Stadium: San Siro; Referee: Priamo Varazzani

19 December 1965 13	Sampdoria	0–5	Inter Milan	Genoa
		Report	12' Facchetti; 14' Bedin; 68' (pen.), 76' Mazzola; 78' Jair	Stadium: Stadio Luigi Ferraris; Referee: Sergio Gonella

26 December 1965 14	Inter Milan	0–0	Bologna	Milan
		Report		Stadium: San Siro; Referee: Fabio Monti

1 January 1966 15	Juventus	0–0	Inter	Turin
		Report		Stadium: Comunale; Referee: Concetto Lo Bello

9 January 1966 16	Lazio	1–3	Inter Milan	Rome
	Governato 78'	Report	7' Domenghini; 21' Mazzola; 41' Jair	Stadium: Stadio Olimpico; Referee: Fabio Monti

16 January 1966 17	Inter Milan	0–0	Napoli	Milan
		Report		Stadium: San Siro; Referee: Bruno De Marchi

23 January 1966 18	Varese	1–3	Inter Milan	Varese
	Ferrario 75'	Report	30' Cappellini; 54' Corso; 59' Mazzola	Stadium: Stadio Franco Ossola; Referee: Mario Bernardis

30 January 1966 19	Inter Milan	3–2	Vicenza	Milan
	Demarco 7' (o.g.); Peiró 74', 75'	Report	3' Maraschi; 40' Vinicio	Stadium: San Siro; Referee: Fulvio Pieroni

6 February 1966 20	Atalanta	0–2	Inter Milan	Bergamo
		Report	41', 53' Domenghini	Stadium: Stadio Atleti Azzurri d'Italia; Referee: Fabio Monti

13 February 1966 21	Inter Milan	2–2	Roma	Milan
	Mazzola 29'; Suarez 60'	Report	28' Barison; 39' Spanio	Stadium: San Siro; Referee: Antonio Di Tonno

20 February 1966 22	Catania	1–0	Inter Milan	Catania
	Facchin 19'	Report		Stadium: Stadio Cibali; Referee: Alessandro D'Agostini

27 February 1966 23	Inter Milan	5–0	Foggia	Milan
	Domenghini 16'; Suárez 25'; Mazzola 44', 55' (pen.), 61'	Report		Stadium: San Siro; Referee: Fulvio Pieroni

6 March 1966 24	Torino	1–2	Inter Milan	Turin
15:00 UTC+1	Puia 83'	Report	16' Suárez; 86' Cappellini	Stadium: Comunale; Referee: Fabio Monti

13 March 1966 25	Inter Milan	7–0	Brescia	Milan
	Domenghini 1', 16'; Jair 20'; Mazzola 50', 78', 85'; Facchetti 52'	Report		Stadium: San Siro; Referee: Antonio Vitullo

27 March 1966 26	Inter Milan	2–0	Cagliari	Milan
	Bedin 63'; Facchetti 88'	Report		Stadium: San Siro; Referee: Francesco De Robbio

3 April 1966 27	AC Milan	1–2	Inter Milan	Milan
	Amarildo 32'	Report	8' Bedin; 68' Domenghini	Stadium: San Siro; Referee: Concetto Lo Bello

9 April 1966 28	Inter Milan	2–1	SPAL	Milan
	Peiró 17', 66'	Report	47' Muzzio	Stadium: San Siro; Referee: Antonio Vitullo

17 April 1966 29	Fiorentina	0–0	Inter Milan	Florence
		Report		Stadium: Comunale; Referee: Antonio Sbardella

24 April 1966 30	Inter Milan	1–1	Sampdoria	Milan
	Facchetti 72'	Report	54' Frustalupi	Stadium: San Siro; Referee: Francesco De Robbio

1 May 1966 31	Bologna	2–1	Inter Milan	Bologna
	Pascutti 23'; Perani 28'	Report	16' Bedin	Stadium: Stadio Renato Dall'Ara; Referee: Concetto Lo Bello

8 May 1966 32	Inter	3–1	Juventus	Milan
	Facchetti 9', 14'; Suárez 27'	Report	74' Mazzia	Stadium: San Siro; Referee: Fulvio Pieroni

15 May 1966 33	Inter Milan	4–1	Lazio	Milan
	Suárez 45'; Mazzola 63'; Governato 68' (o.g.); Domenghini 89'	Report	58' Renna	Stadium: San Siro; Referee: Sergio Gonella

22 May 1966 34	Napoli	3–1	Inter Milan	Naples
	Altafini 54', 82'; Juliano 55'	Report	81' (o.g.) Panzanato	Stadium: Stadio San Paolo; Referee: Antonio Sbardella

=== Eightfinals ===
1 December 1965	(Romania) Dinamo Bucharest	2–1	Inter Milan	Bucharest
	Fratila 25'; Haidu 51'		12' Peiró	Stadium: Stadionul Dinamo; Referee: (Switzerland) Keller

16 December 1965	Inter Milan	2–0	(Romania) Dinamo Bucharest	Milan
	Mazzola 22' (pen.); Facchetti 89'			Stadium: San Siro; Referee: (Austria) Mayer

=== Quarterfinals ===
23 February 1966	Inter Milan	4–0	(Hungary) Ferencváros	Milan
	Jair 8'; Corso 36'; Peiró 65', 73'			Stadium: San Siro; Referee: (Spain) Arriba

2 March 1966	(Hungary) Ferencváros	1–1	Inter Milan	Budapest
	Novák 31' (pen.)		62' Domenghini	Stadium: Albert Flórián Stadion; Referee: (West Germany) Kurt Tschenscher

=== Semifinals ===
13 April 1966	(Spain) Real Madrid	1–0	Inter Milan	Madrid
	Pirri 12'			Stadium: Santiago Bernabeu; Referee: (Austria) Wlachojanis

20 April 1966	Inter Milan	1–1	(Spain) Real Madrid	Milan
	Facchetti 78'		20' Amancio	Stadium: San Siro; Referee: (Hungary) Gyorgy Vadas

=== Intercontinental Cup ===
==== First leg ====
8 September 1965	Inter Milan	3–0	(Argentina) Independiente	Milan
	Peiró 3'; Mazzola 22', 59'			Stadium: San Siro; Referee: (Germany) Rudolf Kreitlein

==== Second leg ====
15 September 1965	(Argentina) Independiente	0–0	Inter Milan	Avellaneda
				Stadium: Estadio Libertadores de América; Referee: (Peru) Yamasaki

=== Quarterfinals ===
6 January 1966	Vicenza	1–2	Inter Milan	Vicenza
	Corradi 19'		42' Gori; 78' Domenghini	Stadium: Stadio Romeo Menti; Referee: Fulvio Pieroni

==== Semifinals ====
9 February 1966	Fiorentina	2–1	Inter Milan	Florence
	Brugnera 76'; Hamrin 90'		75' Jair	Stadium: Comunale; Referee: Priamo Varazzani

== Statistics ==
=== Squad statistics ===
Competition	Points	Home				Away				Total				Gf	Ga	DR
Competition	Points	G	W	D	L	G	W	D	L	G	W	D	L	Gf	Ga	DR
Serie A	50	17	11	6	0	17	9	4	4	34	20	10	4	70	28	42
Coppa Italia	-	-	-	-	-	2	1	0	1	2	1	0	1	3	3	0
European Cup	-	3	2	1	0	3	0	1	2	6	2	2	2	9	5	4
Intercontinental Cup	-	1	1	0	0	1	0	1	0	2	1	1	0	3	0	3
Total	-	21	14	7	0	23	10	6	7	44	24	13	7	85	36	49

==== Player statistics ====
No.	Pos	Nat	Player	Total		1965–66 Serie A	
No.	Pos	Nat	Player	Apps	Goals	Apps	Goals
	GK	(Italy) ITA	Sarti	32	-27	32	-27
	DF	(Italy) ITA	Burgnich	30	0	30	0
	DF	(Italy) ITA	Picchi	29	0	29	0
	DF	(Italy) ITA	Guarneri	31	1	31	1
	DF	(Italy) ITA	Facchetti	32	10	32	10
	MF	(Italy) ITA	Bedin	30	5	30	5
	MF	(Italy) ITA	Corso	30	3	30	3
	MF	(Spain) ESP	Luis Suárez	27	5	27	5
	FW	(Italy) ITA	Domenghini	31	12	31	12
	FW	(Italy) ITA	Mazzola	30	19	30	19
	FW	(Brazil) BRA	Jair	27	4	27	4
	GK	(Italy) ITA	Miniussi	3	-1	3	-1
	DF	(Italy) ITA	Facco	1	0	1	0
	DF	(Italy) ITA	Landini	11	0	11	0
	DF	(Italy) ITA	Malatrasi	7	0	7	0
	FW	(Spain) ESP	Peiró	11	4	11	4
	FW	(Italy) ITA	Cappellini	6	2	6	2
	FW	(Italy) ITA	Gori	6	1	6	1
	FW	(Italy) ITA	Canella	1	0	1	0
	MF	(Italy) ITA	Cordova	1	0	1	0

- Source: http://calcio-seriea.net/rose/1965/596/

== See also ==
- Grande Inter
- "Serie A 1965-66". RSSSF.
- "Archivio storico della La Stampa". La Stampa.
- "Archivio storico dell'Unità". L'Unita. Archived from the original on 2013-12-02.
