= Carlo Perrone =

Carlo Perrone may refer to:

- Carlo Perrone (footballer, born July 1960), former footballer and manager of Olhanense
- Carlo Perrone (footballer, born October 1960), former footballer and manager
