= Facco =

Facco is an Italian surname. Notable people with the surname include:

- Giacomo Facco (1676–1753), Italian Baroque violinist, conductor and composer
- Mario Facco (1946–2018), Italian footballer and manager

== See also ==
- Gianfranco Facco-Bonetti (born 1940), Italian diplomat
