= Franco Cordova =

Italian footballer

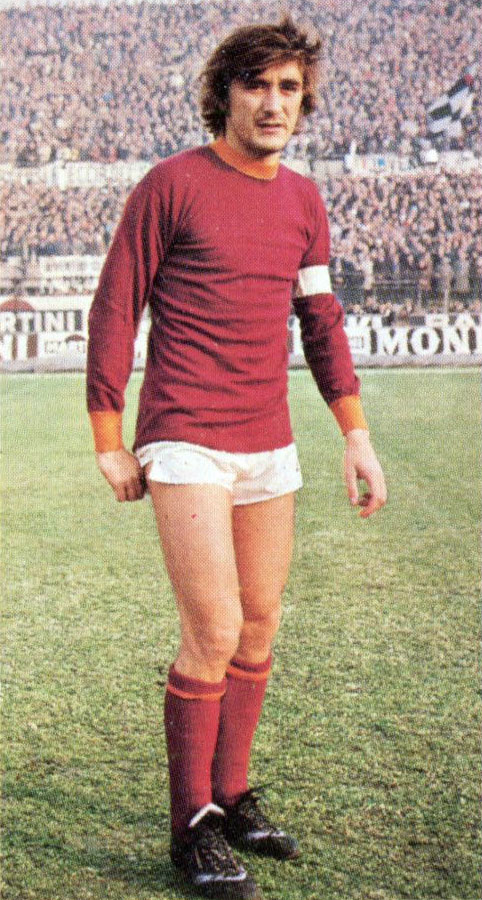
- Cordova captaining Roma in 1974

Personal information
- Date of birth: 21 June 1944 (age 82)
- Place of birth: Forlì, Italian Social Republic
- Height: 1.79 m (5 ft 10 1/2 in)
- Position: Midfielder

Senior career*
Years	Team	Apps	(Gls)
1962–1963	Salernitana	6	(1)
1963–1965	Catania	10	(1)
1965–1966	Internazionale	1	(0)
1966–1967	Brescia	25	(0)
1967–1976	Roma	212	(9)
1976–1979	Lazio	85	(2)
1979–1980	Avellino	5	(1)

International career
1975	Italy	2	(0)
- * Club domestic league appearances and goals

Franco Cordova (Italian pronunciation: [ˈfraŋko ˈkɔrdova]; born 21 June 1944) is a former Italian international football player who played as midfielder.

Born in Forlì but raised in Naples, he played for Catania, Inter and Brescia before settling in Rome at A.S. Roma and becoming team's captain. He then left suddenly for AS Roma's rivals S.S. Lazio in 1976 where he played 3 seasons before ending his career at U.S. Avellino.

He also has 2 full caps for Italy, both in 1975.

His career ended with a 1-year and 2 months ban from football in the Totonero 1980 match-fixing scandal.

== Honours ==
Inter

- Intercontinental Cup: 1965
- Serie A champion: 1965–66.

Roma

- Coppa Italia winner: 1968–69.
- Anglo-Italian Cup: 1971-1972
