= Géza Kertész =

Hungarian footballer

Personal information
- Date of birth: 18 November 1894
- Place of birth: Budapest, Austria-Hungary
- Date of death: 6 February 1945 (aged 50)
- Place of death: Budapest, Hungary
- Position: Midfielder

Senior career*
Years	Team	Apps	(Gls)
1911–1919	BTC Budapesti		
1920–1923	Ferencváros	19	(8)
1925–1926	Spezia (player-manager)	13	(1)

International career
1914	Hungary	1	(0)

Managerial career
- 1925–1926: Spezia
- 1926–1928: Carrarese
- 1928–1929: Viareggio
- 1929–1931: Salernitana
- 1931: Catanzaro
- 1931: Salernitana
- 1931–1933: Catanzaro
- 1933–1936: Catania
- 1936–1938: Taranto
- 1938–1939: Atalanta
- 1939–1940: Lazio
- 1940–1941: Salernitana
- 1941–1942: Catania
- 1942: R.S.T. Littorio
- 1942–1943: Roma
- 1943–1944: Újpest
- * Club domestic league appearances and goals

Géza Kertész (18 November 1894 – 6 February 1945), also known as Kertész IV, was a Hungarian footballer and manager from Budapest. He is most noted for his career as a football manager in Italy at clubs such as Lazio, Roma and Atalanta.

== Death ==
During World War II, Kertesz returned from Italy to Hungary in 1943, when he was recalled to serve as lieutenant-colonel in the Hungarian Army in training role. In liaison with the American secret service he set up a clandestine resistance network with former teammate Istvan Toth which rescued many Hungarian partisans and Jews from deportation to Nazi concentration camps during German occupation and Arrow Cross Party rule, sometimes disguising himself as a German Wehrmacht officer for cover. He was denounced to the Gestapo by an informer for sheltering Jews and was executed at Budapest alongside Toth on 6 February 1945, a few days before the city was liberated by the Soviet forces.

His body and that of Toth were reburied together with honour at Kerepesi Cemetery, Budapest, in April 1946.
