= Catania football riot =

2007 riot in Catania, Sicily, Italy

- SKY Sport coverage of the clashes
Catania	Palermo
1	2
- Date: 2 February 2007
- Venue: Stadio Angelo Massimino, Catania, Sicily

On 2 February 2007, football violence occurred between football supporters and the police in Catania, Sicily, Italy. The clashes occurred during and after the Serie A match between the Catania and Palermo football clubs, also known as the Sicilian derby. Police officer Filippo Raciti was killed; in response Italian football was suspended for about a week.

== Events ==
Gazzetta dello Sport frontpage on 3 February. The headline reads: Policeman murdered, football closes

The football match between Catania and Palermo, a derby between two of the three Serie A club that hail from Sicily (the other being Messina), was originally scheduled to be played on 4 February at 15:00. However, after requests from the Catania management, the Lega Nazionale Professionisti brought the match forward to 2 February, with 18:00 as the scheduled kick-off time, in order to avoid clashing with the official St. Agatha celebrations in Catania.

The match started without the Palermo supporters, who arrived in the stadium ten minutes after the beginning of the second half, allegedly because of organizational problems. After the Palermo supporters' entrance, with Palermo leading 1–0 thanks to a controversial goal by Andrea Caracciolo, the throwing of smoke bombs and firecrackers started, forcing the police to reply by throwing tear gas canisters towards the Ultras (groups of football supporters). As a result, the match referee Stefano Farina decided to suspend the match for over forty minutes, in part because tear gas had drifted into the stadium and was affecting the players. After the end of the match, won 2–1 by Palermo, Catania supporters outside the venue began attacking members of the police force; Raciti died during these incidents, a fatality which was found to be due to severe liver injuries caused by a blunt object, contradicting an initial hypothesis which claimed his death was caused by an improvised explosive device. The local magistrate assured there was no direct responsibility by Palermo supporters in the events.

== Filippo Raciti ==
The riot's sole fatality was police officer Filippo Raciti.

Born in Catania, Sicily, Raciti joined the Italian police in June 1986, and joined the local flying squad in late 2006. He lived in Acireale, in the Province of Catania with his wife and two children, aged 15 and 9.

A week before his death, Raciti gave evidence at the trial of a football hooligan, who was then freed by the local magistrate. According to one of his colleagues, the hooligan laughed in his face as he left the court.

Raciti died as a result of liver damage caused by blunt object trauma, disproving an initial hypothesis which claimed his death was caused by a homemade firecracker.

Raciti's death provoked outrage in Italy, with a great and somewhat uncommon amount of solidarity towards the Italian law enforcement forces, and massive coverage worldwide. A 17-year-old from Catania was later jailed and detained in custody, charged with the murder. As of February 2007, he was being investigated by the Italian police.

On 17 February 2007, the city council of Quarrata, in Tuscany, approved a proposal to name the local football stadium after the Italian policeman. An official ceremony, also attended by Raciti's widow, was held on 10 March, making Quarrata the first city to name a stadium after him.

== Aftermath ==
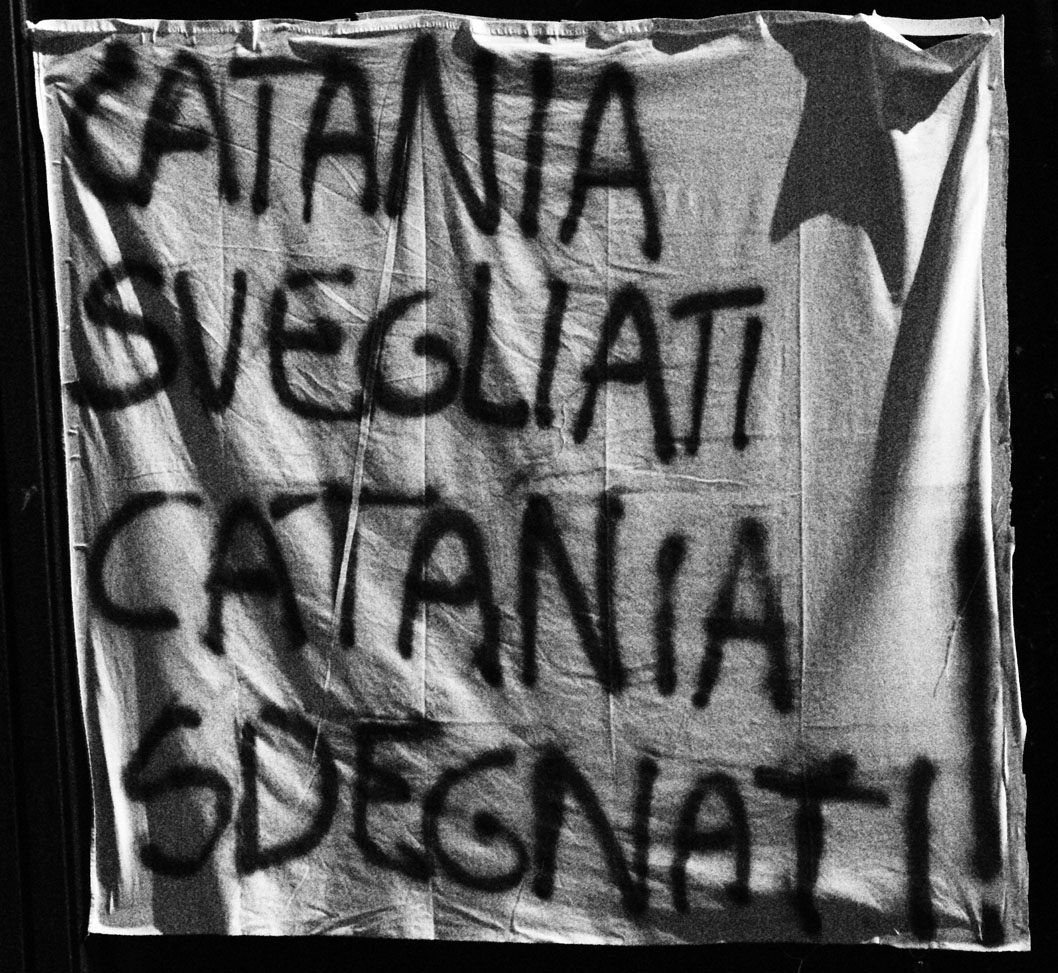
A banner against violence in football at the Massimino stadium, Catania. (translated: "Catania, wake up. Catania, show your indignation.")

The Sicilian derby riots happened a week after the death of an amateur football club official named Ermanno Licursi, who was beaten to death during a riot soon after a Terza Categoria league match.

Events in Catania led Italian Football Federation commissioner Luca Pancalli to cancel all football-related events in the country, including all professional and amateur league matches, as well as all national team matches. The whole football world strongly condemned the riot, showing full support for Pancalli's decision to stop all football activities in Italy, and suggested a solution akin to the UK's Football Spectators Act 1989, the goal of which was to wipe out football hooliganism.

Catania chairman and owner Antonino Pulvirenti announced his willingness to leave the football world, stating it was not possible to go on "doing football" in the city of Catania. A couple of days later he reconsidered.

The day after the event, graffiti appeared in the headquarters of local newspaper Il Tirreno in Livorno, hailing the riot as revenge for the 2001 death of anti-globalization rioter Carlo Giuliani. Similar graffiti also appeared in Piacenza, Rome, Milan, and Palermo.

== Consequences ==
Following the riots, the government announced its willingness to harshen the current football stadia act, also known as Pisanu decree (Italian: Decreto Pisanu) after former Minister of the Interior Giuseppe Pisanu, who enacted the law in 2005. In its original form, the Pisanu decree required Italian mayors and football clubs to meet specific safety standards in their stadiums; however, these have been ignored by most of Serie A and B clubs, meaning that the majority of Italian football venues, including Catania, did not comply with these standards. Former Minister of the Interior Giuliano Amato officially permitted departures from these standards for the 2006–07 football season. The events in Catania, however, led Minister Amato, and Minister of Sports Giovanna Melandri, to immediately cancel every derogation, thus forcing teams to play "behind closed doors" (forbidding the presence of spectators for every venue not within the law), including Stadio San Siro in Milan, Stadio San Paolo in Naples and Stadio Artemio Franchi in Florence. Catania were banned from playing in their stadium for the remainder of the season, and had to play the remainder of their home fixtures at a neutral venue. The Catania club was successively punished by the Italian Football Federation with the obligation not to play its home matches in its home stadium, and additionally with no spectators (a porte chiuse). This was however partially overturned on 4 April by the TAR (Tribunale Amministrativo Regionale, regional administrative court) of Catania, which decided the Football Federation should allow spectators to take part on the team's home matches. The decision was overturned by the TAR of Rome some days later, but re-overturned by the Catania TAR in mid-April; this caused the delay of the league match Catania vs Ascoli, originally scheduled to be played on 22 April in Modena with no spectators' presence. The match was rescheduled on 2 May. In the end, the FIGC allowed Catania supporters to attend the two final "home" matches against AC Milan and Chievo, both played at Stadio Renato Dall'Ara, Bologna.

Other countermeasures provided by the government include a ban on rockets, smoke-producers and firecrackers at sports events, the prohibition of night-matches for the entire month of February 2007, a ban on the block sale of tickets to away supporters, and the so-called "preventive Daspo" (where Daspo stands for "Prohibition to Participate to Sports Events"), which since 1992 allows the police force to precautionarily ban suspected hooligans from attending football matches. Clubs will also be forbidden to make financial or working relationships with the fan associations. The Amato decree which included all such measures was finally ratified by the Senate on 4 April, only five days short of its expiration (in Italy, a governmental decree must be ratified by both the chambers of the Parliament in sixty days).

On 10 February, the San Siro in Milan was declared safe enough to host the match of the next day.

On 2 September, Stadio Massimino finally reopened its doors for the first time since the tragic events causing Raciti's death, hosting a Serie A 2007-08 game between Catania and Genoa, after the venue underwent major work to fulfil the newly introduced safety regulations. Raciti's widow Marisa Grasso attended the match, and one minute silence was observed before the starting whistle to honour the inspector's memory.

== See also ==
- 2006–07 Serie A
- Sicilian derby
