= Stadio Angelo Massimino =

Multi-use stadium in Catania, Italy

Coordinates: 37°30′57″N 15°4′17″E

- Cibali
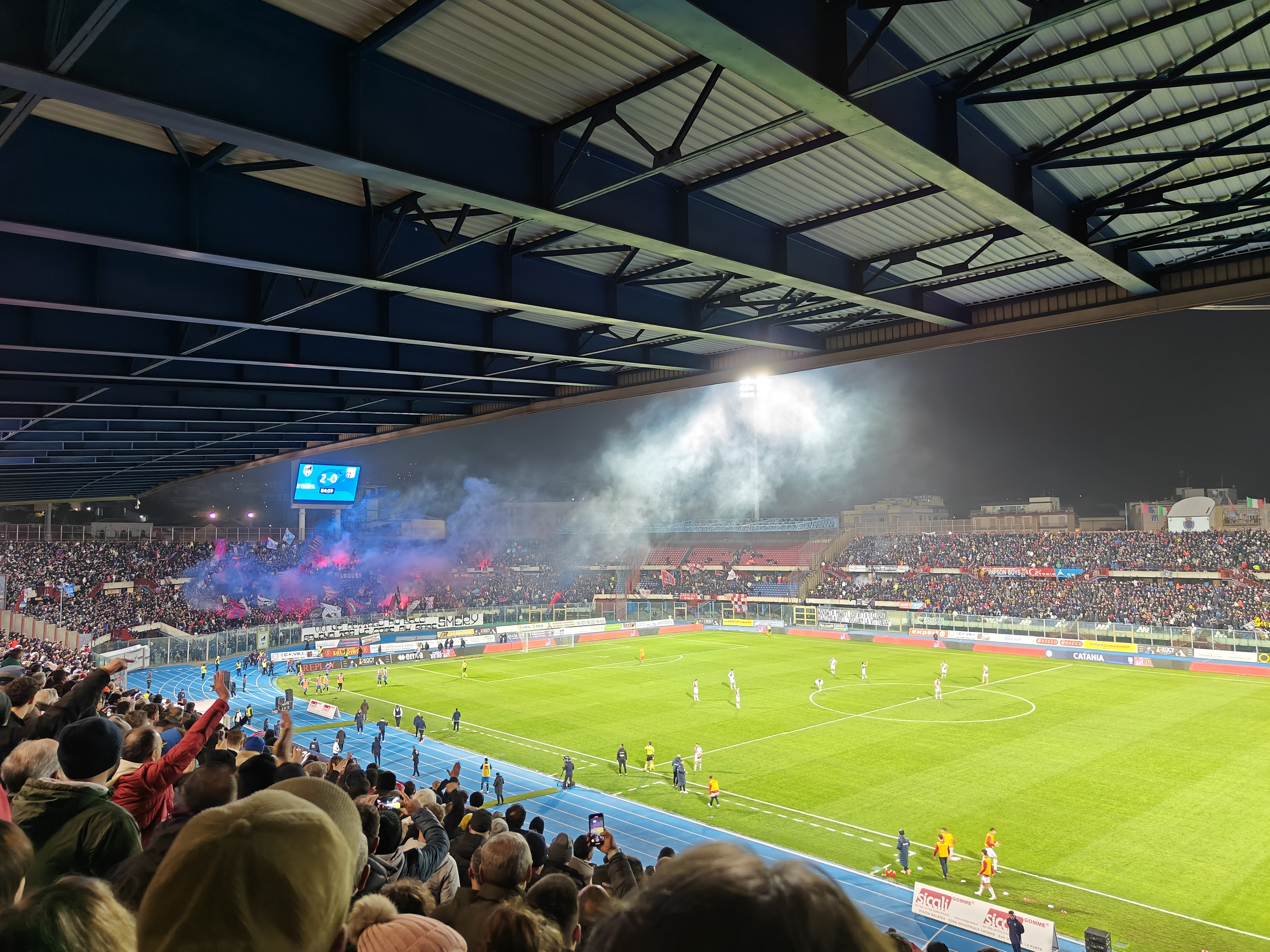
- Interactive map of Stadio Angelo Massimino
- Former names: Stadio Cibali
- Location: Catania, Italy
- Owner: Municipality of Catania
- Capacity: 23,266
- Surface: Grass

Construction
- Groundbreaking: 1937
- Opened: 1937

Tenants
- Calcio Catania (1937–present); Italy national football team (selected matches)

Stadio Angelo Massimino (previously known as Stadio Cibali) is a multi-use stadium in Catania, Italy. It is used mostly for football matches and the home of Calcio Catania. The stadium was built in 1935 by architect Raffaele Leone on behalf of the company owned by Antonio Ferro and holds 23,266 people. It was renamed in 2002 after former Catania chairman Angelo Massimino (1927–1996).

The Angelo Massimino stadium in Catania, formerly the Cibali stadium from the homonymous Catania district in which it is located (it is still commonly known by this name), is the multi-sports stadium that hosts the home matches of Calcio Catania. It was also the stadium of Atletico Catania and Jolly Componibili Catania, the women's football team that won the 1978 Scudetto. It is among the best known stadiums in Italy.

== History ==
It was built from 1935 on a project by the architect Raffaele Leone on behalf of the company owned by the engineer Antonio Ferro and inaugurated on 28 November 1937 on the occasion of the Serie C match between ACF Catania and Foggia, which ended 1-0 for the hosts. Baptized Cibali (and nicknamed "stadium of the twenty thousand"), in 1941 it was dedicated to Italo Balbo, only to sum up the first name after the fall of fascism. Since 1960, after the second promotion to Serie A, the management of Catania advances the hypothesis of leaving the plant to build a new stadium in Pantano d'Arci due to the athletics track that prevented and, still today, prevents a perfect view of the game. On 4 June 1961 the stadium was the scene of the famous expression "Clamoroso al Cibali!", When commentator Sandro Ciotti spoke about Catania's victory over Helenio Herrera's Inter. Renovated in 1991 and then in 1997, it hosted two national team matches (in 1998 against Slovakia and in 2002 against the United States), some competitions of various sports, the closing event of the 1997 Summer Universiade and the main games of the Games Military World Cup in 2003. It is equipped with an 8-lane athletics track, a training ground (the Cibalino), a volleyball court (the PalaSpedini, where both Paoletti and Alidea played, who respectively won the Scudetto men's and women's volleyball courts), an external basketball court (the external PalaSpedini) and various offices. In the Catania Calcio magazine of February 2002, 20 good reasons were listed for why the stadium was inadequate but, despite several projects being carried out, not even the first stone of the new facility was laid. In 2007 the Vincenzo Spedini square in front of the stadium was the scene of the clashes that led to the death of the police inspector Filippo Raciti. From the 2008-2009 sports season it has been equipped with an electronic video billboard. In the summer of 2013, the Massimino undergoes a first restyling: the two benches are buried, five Sky boxes are built in the center of grandstand A and two restaurant areas.

Currently, the public tender is published on the MEPA electronic market to identify the company that will have to carry out the restyling project of the stadium and the adjoining reduced-size pitch, called "Cibalino": both pitches will be worked on, with the installation of a mixed natural / synthetic pitch, while the seats in the central stands will be replaced in the stands and new seats will be installed in the two curves. The press stand, the access tunnel from the changing rooms to the pitch and all the toilets of the facility will also be renovated. A new light board will also be installed, replacing the current one, which is 16 meters wide and 4 meters high. Other interventions will concern the internal fence, the athletics track that will be redone, the fire and electrical system, the benches, the parterre-field fence, the partitions between the stands and the area reserved for the disabled, which will be moved to the same level. of the pitch.

The renewal of the older Etnean facility coincides with the establishment of a new football club that will inherit the fate of Calcio Catania SpA, which had gone bankrupt. The new owner, the Sicilian-Australian Ross Pelligra, has already declared that he wants to focus, at least in the early years, on the old plant, trying to make it a structure that is at the service of the neighborhood and the city, as well as the natural stage for the new rossazzurra team, for which the goal is the return of Catania to Serie A in the shortest possible time, starting with the Amateurs.

== Capacity ==
There are different versions of the current capacity of the stadium. After the last renovation, with the addition of the guest sector and the reconstruction of the Curva Sud, many useful areas have been lost (in the sixties, in Serie A, 40,000 fans could be hosted in the stands).

The Lega Calcio reports a capacity of 31 530 seats. As regards the approved capacity, the National Center for Information on Sporting Events (CNIMS) indicates a certified capacity of 26,266 seats.

The maximum number of paying spectators in a league (including season ticket holders) was reached on 14 September 2002 (Catania-Genoa 3-2) with about 28,200 spectators; similar to that for the 1998 Italy-Slovakia football match, but on 28 May 2006 (Catania-AlbinoLeffe 2-1) it was sold out with just 21,327 paying spectators even if there was a greater number of people in the stands, thanks also to the large parterre of Tribuna B and of the curves (north and south), which together with Tribuna A make up the sectors of the stadium.

In 2019, the actual capacity of 20,016 seats was certified, divided as follows: 3,243 in Grandstand A, 4.502 in Grandstand B, 5,865 in Curva Sud, 5.406 in Curva Nord and 1,000 in the Guest Sector. [2] However, these capacities are destined to undergo further changes by virtue of the planned redevelopment works of the stadium, which involve the installation of 20,806 new seats.

== International football matches ==
- Italy - Slovakia 3-0 (28 January 1998, friendly)
- Italy - United States 1-0 (13 February 2002, friendly)
- Italy - Moldova 4-0 (6 September 2019, friendly under 21)
- Italy - Armenia 6-0 (19 November 2019, European under 21 qualifiers)

== International rugby matches ==
- Italy - Romania 24-6 (1 October 1994)
- Italy - Fiji 19-10 (11 November 2017)

== Transportation ==
- Cibali Metro stop
- Milo Metro stop
- AMTS Urban Bus Lines

== Use and beneficiaries ==
- Catania (Football) (1937–Today)
- Massiminiana (Football) (1959–1976)
- Atletico Catania (Football)

(1986–1988; 1994–2001)

- Jolly Catania (women's soccer)

(1976–1979)

- Sicula Leonzio (Football) (2017–2018)
