= Adelmo Prenna =

Italian footballer and manager (1930-2008)

Personal information
- Date of birth: 27 May 1930
- Place of birth: Rome, Italy
- Date of death: 15 December 2008 (aged 78)
- Place of death: Catania, Italy
- Height: 1.83 m (6 ft 0 in)
- Position: Midfielder

Senior career*
Years	Team	Apps	(Gls)
1950–1955	Colleferro		
1955–1956	Roma	13	(6)
1956–1958	SPAL	34	(6)
1958–1963	Catania	140	(40)
1963–1964	Napoli	8	(2)
1964–1967	Massiminiana		
1967–1969	Leonzio		

Managerial career
- 1967–1969: Leonzio
- 1969–1970: Massiminiana
- 1973–1974: Catania
- * Club domestic league appearances and goals

Adelmo Prenna (born 27 May 1930 – 14 December 2008) was an Italian professional football player and coach.

He played for 6 seasons (128 games, 37 goals) in the Serie A for A.S. Roma, SPAL 1907 and Calcio Catania.

He holds the record for most league goals and most goals scored in one season in Serie A for Calcio Catania.
