= Nello Governato =

Italian footballer and sports director (1938–2019)

Personal information
- Date of birth: 14 September 1938
- Place of birth: Turin, Italy
- Date of death: 7 June 2019 (aged 80)
- Place of death: Rome, Italy
- Height: 1.76 m (5 ft 9 in)
- Position: Midfielder

Senior career*
Years	Team	Apps	(Gls)
- Torino
- Como
1961–1966	Lazio		
1966–1967	Lanerossi Vicenza		
1967–1971	Lazio		
1971–1973	Savona		
- * Club domestic league appearances and goals

Nello Governato (14 September 1938 – 7 June 2019) was an Italian footballer who played for Torino, Como, Lazio, Lanerossi Vicenza and Savona. He later worked as a director of sports at Lazio, Bologna, Juventus and Fiorentina.
