= Angelo Massimino =

Italian entrepreneur

Angelo Massimino (Catania, 1927 — Scillato, 4 March 1996) was an Italian entrepreneur and football owner, who served as chairman of Calcio Catania for almost 25 years.

A Sicilian emigrant who made his fortune in Argentina, returned in Catania during the 1950s and, together with his brothers, founded in 1962 an amateur football club called Massiminiana, leading them up to Serie C, where they played for four consecutive seasons. In 1968, he became the owner of Calcio Catania, and immediately invested in his new club, obtaining a promotion to Serie A only one year later. He then resigned in 1972, following immediate relegation to Serie B followed by two poor seasons in the second-highest national division, but returned to serve as chairman two years later, immediately obtaining a second promotion. During the following years, Catania proved to be a yo-yo team, playing in all of the three highest national division, making a one-year comeback to Serie A in 1983. He left the club in 1987 following relegation to Serie C1 and criticisms by the local supporters. He however returned once again in 1992 to save the club from bankruptcy, but was unable to avoid a controversial cancellation of his club one year later. The club cancellation was later declared invalid by the Italian magistrature, and Catania was readmitted to Italian football, namely into the Eccellenza regional league, and immediately started to rise the football league pyramid with two consecutive promotions, despite Massimino's partial blindness and worsening health caused by diabetes. Angelo Massimino died in 1996, aged 69, in a road accident on the Palermo-Catania highway. His funeral in Catania was attended by over a thousand people.

Massimino is still remembered by Catania supporters as their most representative chairman, and the local stadium, formerly known as Cibali, was named after him in 2002. He was also nationally known for his poor Italian language skills, heavily influenced by his Sicilian heritage, and several blunders who made him popular among Italian football fans.
