= Lamberto Leonardi =

Italian footballer and coach (1939–2021)

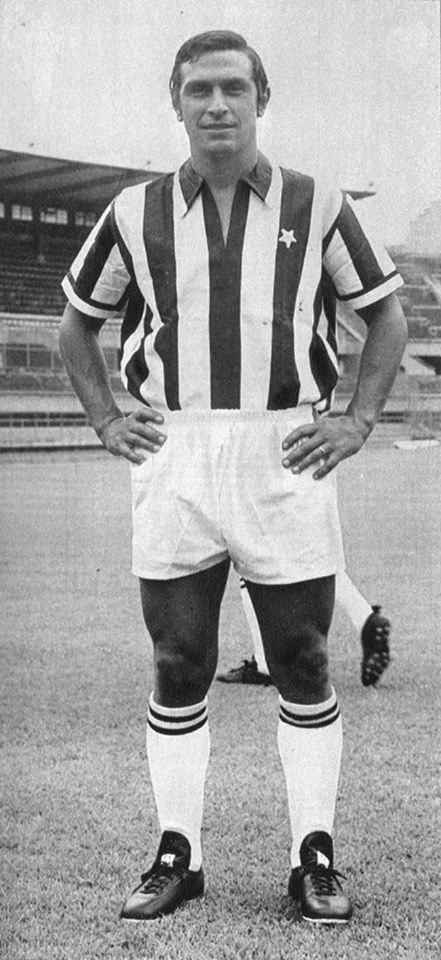
- Leonardi with Juventus in 1969

Personal information
- Date of birth: 8 August 1939
- Place of birth: Rome, Italy
- Date of death: 22 February 2021 (aged 81)
- Place of death: Latina, Italy
- Height: 1.73 m (5 ft 8 in)
- Position: Midfielder

Senior career*
| Years | Team | Apps | (Gls) |
| 1958–1959 | Roma | 2 | (0) |
| 1959–1960 | Cosenza | 29 | (3) |
| 1960–1961 | Prato | 28 | (2) |
| 1961–1962 | Modena | 29 | (3) |
| 1962–1966 | Roma | 74 | (5) |
| 1966–1969 | Varese | 86 | (20) |
| 1969–1970 | Juventus | 28 | (5) |
| 1970–1972 | Atalanta | 36 | (2) |
| 1972–1973 | Mantova | 0 | (0) |
| Total | | 312 | (40) |

Managerial career
- 1974–1975: Ischia
- 1975–1976: Paganese
- 1976–1979: Latina
- 1980–1981: Salernitana
- 1981–1982: Nocerina
- 1982–1983: Foggia
- 1983–1985: Francavilla
- 1986–1987: Torres
- 1989: Salernitana
- 1993–1994: Nocerina
- 1995: Catania
- 1999–2001: Torres
- * Club domestic league appearances and goals

Lamberto Leonardi (8 August 1939 – 22 February 2021) was an Italian professional football coach and player.
