= Angelo Spanio =

Italian footballer (1939-1999)

Personal information
- Date of birth: October 4, 1939
- Place of birth: Venice, Italy
- Date of death: October 1, 1999 (aged 59)
- Height: 1.77 m (5 ft 9 1/2 in)
- Position: Midfielder

Senior career*
Years	Team	Apps	(Gls)
1958–1960	Mestrina	15	(3)
1960–1961	Pro Vercelli	31	(6)
1961–1962	Parma	34	(2)
1962–1963	Torino	2	(0)
1963–1964	Parma	33	(5)
1964–1965	Napoli	21	(4)
1965–1966	Roma	26	(3)
1966–1967	Savona	22	(1)
1967–1968	Cesena	19	(11)
1968–1971	Spezia	95	(19)
- * Club domestic league appearances and goals

Angelo Spanio (October 4, 1939 in Venice – October 1, 1999) was an Italian professional football player.

He played for 3 seasons (28 games, 3 goals) in the Serie A for A.C. Torino and A.S. Roma.

== See also ==
- Football in Italy
- List of football clubs in Italy
