= Gian Piero Ghio =

Italian footballer and coach

Personal information
- Date of birth: 28 January 1944 (age 82)
- Place of birth: Agna, Italy
- Height: 1.78 m (5 ft 10 in)
- Position: Striker

Senior career*
Years	Team	Apps	(Gls)
1962–1965	Sampdoria	2	(0)
1963–1964	→ Vis Pesaro (loan)	19	(1)
1965–1966	Monza	18	(3)
1966–1967	Sampdoria	2	(0)
1967–1968	Avellino	29	(28)
1968–1970	Lazio	66	(15)
1970–1971	Napoli	27	(4)
1971–1972	Internazionale	9	(1)
1972–1973	Atalanta	9	(1)
1973–1975	Novara	51	(9)
1975–1976	Juniorcasale	22	(3)
1976–1977	Brescia	28	(4)

Managerial career
- 1980–1981: Ternana
- 1982–1983: Alessandria
- 1983–1984: Cosenza
- 1984–1986: Salernitana
- 1988–1989: Pavia
- 1989–1990: Mantova
- 1991–1992: Mantova
- 1993–1994: Giarre
- 1996–1997: Spezia
- * Club domestic league appearances and goals

Gian Piero Ghio (born 28 January 1944 in Agna) is an Italian football coach and former player who played as a forward. He scored 69 goals from 282 appearances in the Italian professional leagues, which included 72 appearances in Serie A.
