= Nicolò Nicolosi =

Italian footballer and manager

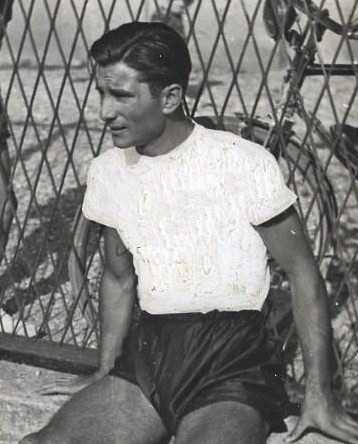

Personal information
- Full name: Nicolò Nicolosi
- Date of birth: 9 August 1912
- Place of birth: Lercara Friddi, Italy
- Date of death: 3 May 1986 (aged 73)
- Position: Forward

Senior career*
Years	Team	Apps	(Gls)
1930–1932	Lazio	2	(2)
1932–1937	Catania	106	(57)
1937–1938	Napoli	9	(2)
1938–1939	Atalanta	23	(7)
1939–1940	Catania	23	(3)
1940–1941	Atalanta	5	(1)
1942–1943	Vigevano	5	(0)
	Saronno	7	(5)
	Rovigo	1	(0)
- Frattese
	Catania	9	(2)

Managerial career
- 1948: Catania
- 1953–1954: Pisa
- 1954: Palermo
- 1957–1958: Catania
- 1958–1959: Salernitana
- 1969–1970: Massiminiana
- * Club domestic league appearances and goals

Nicolò Nicolosi (9 August 1912 – 3 May 1986) was an Italian football player and manager from Lercara Friddi in the Province of Palermo. During his career, Nicolosi played as a forward for Lazio, Napoli and Atalanta in Serie A.

He played for six seasons in Catania Calcio, both in Serie B and Serie C, partaking in over 150 games and was later a manager there for some time.
