= Catania FC =

Association football club in Italy

Catania
- Full name: Catania Football Club S.r.l.
- Nicknames: I Rossazzurri (The Red and Blues); Gli Elefanti (The Elephants); Gli Etnei (The Etneans)
- Founded: 19 June 1908; 118 years ago 1946; 80 years ago (refounded); 2022; 4 years ago (refounded)
- Stadium: Stadio Angelo Massimino
- Capacity: 23,266
- Owner: Catania Calcio Holding S.r.l.
- President: Ross Pelligra
- Head coach: Emilio Longo
- League: Serie C Group C
- 2025–26: Serie C Group C, 2nd of 20
- Website: cataniafc.it
Home colours	Away colours	Third colours

Catania Football Club, commonly known as Catania, is an Italian football club based in the city of Catania, Sicily, that plays in Serie C.

Originally founded on 19 June 1908 as Associazione Sportiva Educazione Fisica Pro Patria, the club boasts 17 appearances in the top flight of the Italian football league, reaching eighth place in Serie A in two seasons during the first half of the 1960s and again in 2012–13. It is the 12th most popular team in Italy, with around 600,000 fans. Catania has participated in international competitions such as the Mitropa Cup, the Coppa dell'Amicizia, and the Cup of the Alps.

== History ==
=== Foundation and early years (1901–1943) ===
Crews of English merchant ships brought football to Sicily and the earliest Catania team can be traced to a match that took place on 2 May 1901 at San Raineri (the peninsula that forms one side of the Port of Messina) against Messina F.C.. The team comprised members of the crew of the Royal Yacht Squadron schooner Catania, owned by the 4th Duke of Sutherland and crewed by Catanians.

The team was a pastime for the Catania's crew, and Catania's first professional football club was founded on 19 June 1908 by Italian film director Gaetano Ventimiglia and Francesco Sturzo d'Aldobrando, who founded the club under the name Associazione Sportiva Educazione Fisica Pro Patria. Early on, they played against sailors visiting the port of Catania, foreign ships in particular, though their first ever match was against crewmen from the Italian battleship Regina Margherita; the game ended in a 1–1 draw and the Catania line-up that day consisted of Vassallo, Gismondo, Bianchi, Messina, Slaiter, Caccamo, Stellario, Binning, Cocuzza, Ventimiglia and Pappalardo. Just two years later, the club was renamed to Unione Sportiva Catanese.

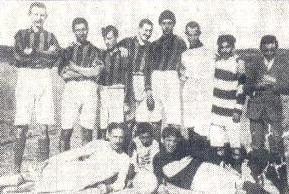
Earliest club photograph as Pro Patria in 1908

In Northern Italy, football was more organised and clubs in the area competed in the early Italian Football Championship, while the southern clubs competed in competitions such as the Lipton, Sant' Agata, and Agordad cups. U.S. Catanese survived World War I, and after that, played in the local Coppa Federale Siciliana. Seven seasons later, in 1927, they were promoted to the Campionato Catanese, later winning in the 1928–29 season. As they gained promotion, the team entered the Seconda Divisione, but the fascist reform of Italian football dictated the disbandment of U.S. Catanese and the establishment of Società Sportiva Catania on 27 June 1929. The new club first competed in Serie B in the 1934–35 season, where they finished fourth; that year, Genoa won the Serie B title.

Catania played in the league for three seasons during this period before ultimately being relegated. Down in Serie C, Catania was crowned the champion in the 1938–39 season, finishing above Sicilian rivals Siracusa and Messina, who came in second and third place respectively. The club finished bottom of the league in Serie B and won only three games that season. The club's name was briefly changed to Associazione Fascista Calcio Catania during the 1942–43 season in Serie C, which ended prematurely due to World War II.

=== Rebirth (1945–1949) ===
Calcio Catania during 1946

After World War II ended, a local competition was organised, the Campionato Siciliano. At the end of that season, a local team named Elefante Catania was merged into the club. The merged club kept the U.S. Catanese name and competed in Serie C during the 1945–46 season, but finished last. In the same league that season, a team called Virtus Catania competed with them, finishing eighth.

At the end of the 1945–46 season, U.S. Catanese and Virtus Catania merged to form Calcio Catania, with the club's first president as Santi Manganaro-Passanisi, who had previously been president of U.S. Catanese. They were promoted to Serie C, where they spent three seasons. After a duel with Reggina for first place in the league, Catania gained a promotion to Serie B for the 1948–49 season.

=== Golden years (1953–1965) ===
The late 1950s–1960s are considered the golden years for the Catanian club, as they managed to achieve a promotion to Serie A on two occasions during this time. Their first promotion from Serie B came when, during the 1953–54 season, they beat Cagliari and Lombardy side Pro Patria and were crowned champions of the division. Their first season in Serie A saw the club achieve a respectable 12th-place finish, but the club was forcibly relegated due to financial scandals, as were Udinese Calcio.

Catania during their second spell in Serie A, in the 1960s

Under the management of Carmelo Di Bella, who had played for the club in the late 1930s, Catania gained promotion from Serie B in the 1959–60 season. Catania had lost their final game 4–2 to Brescia and needed Parma to get a good result against Triestina for the Sicilian club to secure promotion. That is exactly what happened, and Catania had gained a promotion.

Catania returned into Serie A for the 1960–61 season to begin what would be a six-year stay in the league. The newly promoted club finished in eighth, above top Italian clubs such as Lazio and Napoli. This season produced several notable wins; they beat Napoli and Bologna twice, Sampdoria 3–0 at home, and most notably, Milan 4–3 in Sicily. Additionally, on the final day of the season, they beat Inter Milan 2–0, with goals from Castellazzi and Calvanese. Inter lost the closely contested title that year to Juventus.

Four years later, in 1965, Catania would also finish eighth in the league, this time above Roma and Sicilian rivals Messina. Many of the club's most notable stars played around this time, such as midfielders Alvaro Biagini and the Brazilian Chinesinho, along with wingers Carlo Facchin and Giancarlo Danova in the side. Catania won against Juventus (2–0), Fiorentina (2–0), and Lazio (1–0).

=== Decline (1966–1984) ===
After Catania's relegation in 1966, Carmelo Di Bella left and the club stayed in Serie B, later playing with Palermo in the Sicilian derby before the Palermitan club was promoted. Catania followed in 1969–70 with a third-place finish, gaining a promotion. They were relegated from Serie A after one season. In that season, they had a 3–1 win against Lazio and a draw at home against Milan. Catania only scored 18 goals altogether in 30 games.

In 1973–74, they were relegated down to Serie C, but were able to get a promotion to Serie B by winning as champions. A similar situation occurred in 1976–77, where they were relegated down to Serie C. They finished second, and later third, before finally being crowned champions of what was now known as Serie C1 in 1979–80.

After three short seasons, Catania was promoted after finishing in third place, behind Milan and Lazio, into Serie A. They played the 1983–84 season in Italy's top league, only winning once (which came against Pisa) with 12 points.

=== Further decline and revival (1985–2006) ===
The decline of Catania started after their last relegation to Serie B. The team was no longer able to reach the top division of Italian football, and instead continued to decline, remaining in Serie C1 for the latter part of the 1980s. In 1993, the team's participation for the year was cancelled by the Italian Football Federation (FIGC) due to financial irregularities.

After a court session, magistrates declared the FIGC's decision as invalid, thus forcing it to include Catania back into the footballing fold for the year. Catania was included in the Sicilian Eccellenza (the sixth tier of Italian football). In the meantime, another Sicilian football team, Atletico Leonzio, from Lentini (in the Province of Syracuse), had been relocated in the city and renamed Atletico Catania. Despite all of this, the real Catania was able to promote back to Serie C in a short amount of time, later back to Serie B in 2002.

In 2003, Catania was at the centre of a controversy that led to the enlargement of Serie B from 20 to 24 teams, known as Caso Catania. The club claimed that Siena fielded an ineligible player in a 1–1 tie, a result which saw Catania relegated, whereas the two extra points from a victory would have kept them safe. They were awarded a 2–0 victory before the result was reverted because the guilty player was a substitute which did not play the match; Catania appealed to the judges of the Autonomous Region of Sicily, who evaluated the victory. In August, the FIGC decided to let Catania, along with Genoa and Salernitana, stay in Serie B; the newly reborn Fiorentina was also added for the 2003–04 season. The ruling led to protests and boycotts by the other Serie B clubs that delayed the start of the season, until the intervention of the Italian government.

The league was reduced to 22 teams for 2004–05, while at the same time, Serie A expanded from 18 to 20 teams. During the start of that season, Antonino Pulvirenti, chairman of the flight company Wind Jet and owner of Sicilian Serie C1 team Acireale, bought the club. Catania's new ownership revived the team, and in 2005–06, Catania ended in second place, earning a promotion to Serie A.

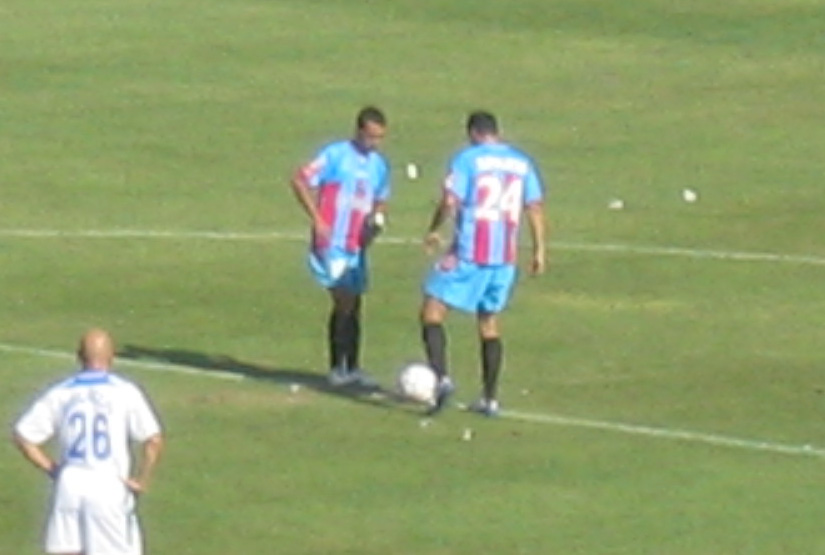
Catania against Atalanta in Serie A in 2006

=== Return to Serie A (2006–2013) ===
The 2006–07 season had Catania in Serie A for its first appearance in 22 years. In their first year back, their home form saw them peak as high as fourth place after 20 games.

Their return season changed drastically on 2 February 2007, due to the a violent incident. It happened during the Sicilian derby with Palermo – policeman Filippo Raciti was killed during football-related violence caused by Catania ultras outside the Stadio Angelo Massimino. The event led FIGC Commissioner Luca Pancalli to cancel all football-related events in the country for a period of time, including league and national team matches. Catania chairman and owner Antonino Pulvirenti announced his willingness to leave the football world, stating it was not possible to go on staging football matches in Catania.

After the Italian football league reopened, Catania continued on. They failed to win for 12 games in a row before beating Udinese 1–0 in late April 2007, where they eventually finished 13th.

The following season, with manager Pasquale Marino leaving for Udinese and Silvio Baldini taking charge of the team, proved to be much harder. In the Coppa Italia, Catania reached to the semi-finals, then lost to Roma. Subsequently, Baldini resigned from his post on 31 March 2008, being replaced by Walter Zenga. Despite this, Zenga managed to lead the rossazzurri off the relegation zone in a heated final week game, a 1–1 home tie to Roma, with an equaliser goal scored by Jorge Martínez in the 85th minute. Zenga was successively confirmed in charge of the team for the upcoming 2008–09 season.

On 5 June 2009, Zenga left Catania to be the manager at arch-rival football club Palermo. He was replaced by Gianluca Atzori, with one year of experience at Lega Pro Prima Divisione team Ravenna. Atzori was noted for using an attacking 4–3–3 formation at Ravenna and was expected to continue a similar approach with the Elefanti.

On 8 December 2009, Siniša Mihajlović was appointed new head coach of Catania, taking over Atzori. He signed a contract until June 2011, with the Elefanti. Arriving at the club that was last in the Serie A standings, Mihajlović debuted with a loss against Livorno. The following week, his team beat Juventus away in Turin with a 2–1 scoreline. After Mihajlović's departure to Fiorentina, Catania appointed Marco Giampaolo as new head coach for the 2010–11 season. In January 2011, Catania decided to remove Giampaolo from his position due to poor results and replace him with former Argentine football player Diego Simeone, who managed to guide the Sicilians to safety before to part company by the end of the season, after only four months in charge of the team. Later, Catania appointed 37-year-old Vincenzo Montella to replace Simeone at his second managerial experience after having served as caretaker at Roma during the final part of the 2010–11 season.

Rolando Maran managed the team in the 2012–13 season, who guided Catania to a record-breaking season where they accrued 56 points from 38 Serie A matches. The season also saw Catania take a record number of home wins in one season, its record number of victories overall in a single top flight campaign, as well as its record points total in Serie A for the fifth consecutive season. They finished ahead of Inter Milan at the conclusion of the season and were just five points away from competing in the UEFA Europa League.

=== Second decline and 2022 bankruptcy (2013–2022) ===
After being relegated from Serie A after the 2013–14 season, Catania was again relegated to the Lega Pro and was deducted by nine points after. During the 2014–15 season, head coach and owner Antonio Pulvirenti admitted to fixing five matches.

The club announced that Sport Investment Group Italia S.p.A. (S.I.G.I.) acquired 95.4% of the club's assets on Friday, 24 July 2020. On 16 January 2021, a preliminary purchase agreement was signed, with which a group of investors represented by the American lawyer Joe Tacopina undertook to purchase all shares from SIGI. The takeover never materialized, and on 22 December 2021, the club was declared insolvent and entered administration. Following three auctions and a takeover offer by entrepreneur Benedetto Mancini, the club's provisional exercise by the Tribunal of Catania effectively ended on 9 April 2022, leading to its immediate exclusion from the 2021–22 Serie C season. Soon after, the Italian Football Federation formalised the club's exclusion from the Italian professional ranks, and released all of the club's players and non-playing staff.

=== 2022 refoundation (2022–present) ===
Club Logo in the 2022–2023 season

In June 2022, Australian real estate development entrepreneur Ross Pelligra, whose mother was born in Catania, was assigned by the city the right to register a new club in the Italian Serie D, in compliance with Article 52 of NOIF. He promised to invest economical resources, with the main goal to bring back Catania to Serie A, additionally showing interest in acquiring the Torre Del Grifo training center, built during the Pulvirenti era.

The new club was renamed to Catania Football Club Società Sportiva Dilettantistica, with Ross Pelligra as president and Vince Grella as vice-president; the new team was subsequently admitted to the 2022–23 Serie D. Catania then went onto finish first in Group I in Serie D, thereby obtaining automatic promotion back into Serie C for the 2023–2024 season.

== Players ==
=== Current squad ===
As of 1 September 2026

Note: Flags indicate national team as defined under FIFA eligibility rules; some limited exceptions apply. Players may hold more than one non-FIFA nationality.

No.	Pos.	Nation	Player
1	GK	ITA	Filippo Rinaldi (on loan from Parma)
2	DF	ITA	Gabriele Pagliai (on loan from Ascoli)
4	MF	ITA	Salvatore Aloi
5	DF	ITA	Marco Perrotta
6	DF	ITA	Andrea Allegretto
7	FW	ITA	Giovanni Bruzzaniti
9	FW	ITA	Salvatore Caturano
10	FW	ITA	Emanuele Cicerelli
15	DF	ITA	Matteo Di Gennaro
16	MF	ITA	Alessandro Quaini
19	DF	ITA	Alessandro Raimo
20	DF	ITA	Daniele Donnarumma
21	FW	ITA	Michael Liguori
23	MF	ITA	Gabriel Lunetta
25	FW	ITA	Christian Torre
27	MF	ITA	Tommaso Di Marco (on loan from Torino)

No.	Pos.	Nation	Player
30	MF	ITA	Andrea Corbari
32	DF	ITA	Edoardo Masciangelo
57	GK	ITA	Andrea Dini
66	GK	ITA	Cristian De Falco
68	DF	ITA	Mario Ierardi
70	FW	ITA	Nicolò Catania
76	MF	ITA	Catello Amendola
99	FW	ITA	Flavio Russo (on loan from Sassuolo)
—	DF	ITA	Eddy Cabianca (on loan from Cremonese)
—	MF	ITA	Fabrizio Caligara
—	MF	ITA	Nicolò Cavuoti (on loan from Cagliari)
—	MF	ITA	Emanuele Torrasi
—	FW	ITA	Massimo Coda
—	FW	ITA	Roberto Insigne
—	FW	ITA	Gianfranco Quiroz

=== Out on loan ===
Note: Flags indicate national team as defined under FIFA eligibility rules; some limited exceptions apply. Players may hold more than one non-FIFA nationality.

No.	Pos.	Nation	Player
—	DF	ITA	Riccardo Cargnelutti (at Sorrento until 30 June 2027)
—	DF	ITA	Fabio Ponsi (at Reggiana until 30 June 2027)
—	MF	ITA	Francesco Di Tacchio (at Casertana until 30 June 2027)
—	MF	ITA	Carmelo Forti (at Siracusa until 30 June 2027)

No.	Pos.	Nation	Player
—	MF	ESP	Kaleb Jiménez (at Spezia until 30 June 2027)
—	FW	ITA	Marco Chiarella (at L'Aquila until 30 June 2027)
—	FW	ITA	Simone Leonardi (at Campobasso until 30 June 2027)

== Presidential history ==
Catania had several presidents over time, some of which have been owners or honorary presidents, below is a list of them since 1946:

Name	Years
Santi Passanisi Manganaro	1946–48
Lorenzo Fazio	1948–51
Arturo Michisanti	1951–54
Giuseppe Rizzo	1954–56
Agatino Pesce Michele Giuffrida	1956–59
Ignazio Marcoccio	1959–69
Angelo Massimino	1969–73
Salvatore Coco	1973–74

Name	Years
Angelo Massimino	1974–87
Angelo Attaguile	1987–91
Salvatore Massimino	1991–92
Angelo Massimino	1992–96
Grazia Codiglione	1996–00
Riccardo Gaucci	2000–04
Antonino Pulvirenti	2004–15
vacant office	2015–22
Ross Pelligra	2022–present

== Managerial history ==
Catania had many managers and trainers over time. In some seasons, more than one manager was in charge. Below is a chronological list of them since 1946:

Name	Years
Giovanni Degni	1946–48
Nicolò Nicolosi	1948
Miroslav Banas	1948–49
Mario Magnozzi	1949–50
Stanislav Klein	1950
Lajos Politzer	1950–51
Nereo Marini	1951–52
Rodolfo Brondi	1952
Giulio Cappelli	1952–53
Fioravante Baldi	1953
Piero Andreoli	1953–56
Matteo Poggi	1956–57
Riccardo Carapellese	1957
Nicolò Nicolosi	1958
Francesco Capocasale	1958
Blagoje Marjanović	1958–59
Carmelo Di Bella	1959–66
Luigi Valsecchi	1966
Dino Ballacci	1966–67
Luigi Valsecchi	1968
Egizio Rubino	1968–71
Salvador Calvanese; Luigi Valsecchi	1971–72
Carmelo Di Bella	1972–73
Luigi Valsecchi	1973
Guido Mazzetti	1974
Adelmo Prenna	1974
Gennaro Rambone	1974–75
Egizio Rubino	1975–76
Guido Mazzetti	1976
Carmelo Di Bella	1976–77
Luigi Valsecchi	1977
Carlo Matteucci	1977–78
Guido Mazzetti	1978
Adelmo Capelli	1978–79
Gennaro Rambone	1979–80
Lino De Petrillo	1980–81
Guido Mazzetti	1981
Giorgio Michelotti	1981–82
Salvo Bianchetti	1982
Guido Mazzetti	1982
Gianni Di Marzio	1982–84
Giovan Battista Fabbri	1984
Antonio Renna	1984–85
Gennaro Rambone	1985
Salvo Bianchetti	1985–86
Antonio Colomban	1986
Gennaro Rambone	1986–87
Bruno Pace	1987
Osvaldo Jaconi	1987
Pietro Santin	1987–88
Bruno Pace	1988–89
Carmelo Russo	1989–90
Angelo Benedicto Sormani	1990–91
Giuseppe Caramanno	1991–92
Franco Vannini	1992
Salvo Bianchetti	1992–93

Name	Years
Franco Indelicato	1993–94
Lorenzo Barlassina	1994
Pier Giuseppe Mosti	1994–95
Angelo Busetta	1995
Lamberto Leonardi	1995
Aldo Cerantola	1995–96
Mario Russo	1996
Angelo Busetta	1996–97
Giovanni Mei	1997–98
Franco Gagliardi	1998
Piero Cucchi	1998–99
Giovanni Simonelli	1999 – 30 Jun 2000
Ivo Iaconi	1 Jul 2000 – 30 Sep 2000
Vincenzo Guerini	15 Oct 2000 – 5 Dec 2000
Aldo Ammazzalorso	23 Jun 2001 – 18 Dec 2001
Pietro Vierchowod	2001
Francesco Graziani; Maurizio Pellegrino	2001–02
Osvaldo Jaconi	1 Jul 2002 – 31 Dec 2002
Maurizio Pellegrino	20 May 2002 – 18 Nov 2003
John Toshack	2002–03
Edoardo Reja	29 Jan 2003 – 6 Apr 2003
Vincenzo Guerini	6 Apr 2003 – 30 Jun 2003
Gabriele Matricciani; Stefano Colantuono	1 Jul 2003 – 30 Jun 2004
Maurizio Costantini	2004–05
Nedo Sonetti	2005
Pasquale Marino	1 Jul 2005 – 4 Jun 2007
Silvio Baldini	1 Jul 2007 – 31 Mar 2008
Walter Zenga	1 Apr 2008 – 30 Jun 2009
Gianluca Atzori	1 Jul 2009 – 7 Dec 2009
Siniša Mihajlović	8 Dec 2009 – 24 May 2010
Marco Giampaolo	30 May 2010 – 18 Jan 2011
Diego Simeone	19 Jan 2011 – 1 Jun 2011
Vincenzo Montella	9 Jun 2011 – 5 Jun 2012
Rolando Maran	11 Jun 2012 – 20 Oct 2013
Luigi De Canio	20 Oct 2013 – 16 Jan 2014
Rolando Maran	16 Jan 2014 – 7 Apr 2014
Maurizio Pellegrino	2014
Giuseppe Sannino	2014
Maurizio Pellegrino	2014–15
Dario Marcolin	2015
Giuseppe Pancaro	2015–16
Francesco Moriero	2016
Pino Rigoli	2016–17
Mario Petrone	2017
Giovanni Pulvirenti	2017
Cristiano Lucarelli	2017–18
Andrea Sottil	2018–19
Walter Novellino	2019
Andrea Sottil	2019
Cristiano Lucarelli	2019–20
Giuseppe Raffaele	2020–21
Francesco Baldini	2021–22
Giovanni Ferraro	2022–23
Luca Tabbiani	2023
Cristiano Lucarelli	2023–current

== Stadium information ==
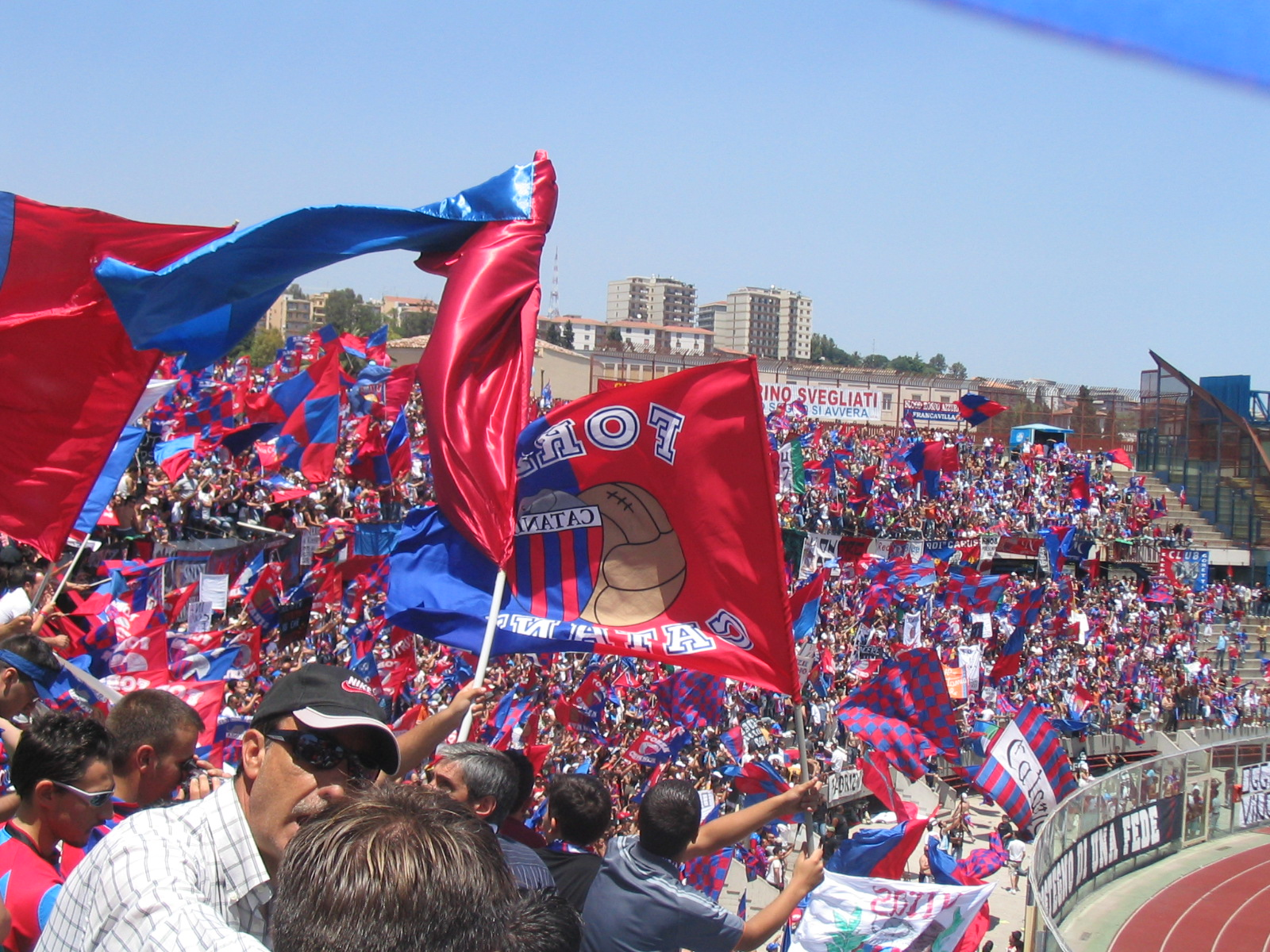
Curva Nord supporters at Stadio Angelo Massimino, Catania

- Name: Stadio Angelo Massimino
- Location: Catania
- Capacity: 23,420
- Inauguration: 27 November 1937
- Pitch Size: 110 x 70 metres

Catania first made their debut at the Stadio Angelo Massimino, formerly called the Stadio Cibali, in 1937. The stadium was renamed in honour of former president Angelo Massimino in 2002; he had been president of the club from 1969 until his death in 1996.

It has been proposed that the club would move to a 33,765 seater stadium named Stadio Dèi Palici, which is to be located in the southern outskirts of the city of Catania in an industrial zone called Pantano d'Arci.

== Sports centre ==
Catania trains at the Torre del Grifo Village sports center, inaugurated on 18 May 2011 and located in the adjacent municipality of Mascalucia. Owned by the Etna club, the centre covers an area of 150,000 m^{2} and has four regulation football fields—two with natural grass and two with synthetic grass—two swimming pools, and four gyms. In addition, Torre del Grifo houses the headquarters of Catania F.C..

== Honours ==
Competition	Titles
Coppa delle Alpi	1960 (representing FIGC)

Competition	Titles
Serie B	1953–54

Competition	titles
Prima Divisione	1933–34

competition	titles
Serie C	1938–39, 1947–48, 1948–49, 1974–75, 1979,80

competition	titles
Serie C2	1998–99

competition	titles
Serie D	1994–95, 2022–23

competition	titles
Eccellenza	1993–94

=== Important placings ===
Coppa delle Alpi	Final
Genoa vs Catania	1964

Coppa Italia	Semifinal
Roma vs Catania	2007–08

== Divisional movements ==
Series	Years	Last	Promotions	Relegations
A	17	2013–14	-	▼5 (1955, 1966, 1971, 1984, 2014)
B	34	2014–15	▲5 (1954, 1960, 1970, 1983, 2006)	▼6 (1937, 1940, 1974, 1977, 1987, 2015)
C +C2	32 +4	2021–22	▲6 (1934, 1939, 1949, 1975, 1980, 2002) ▲1 (1999 C2)	▼2 (1993✟, 2022)
87 out of 90 years of professional football in Italy since 1929
D	2	1994–95	▲2 (1930, 1995)	never
E	1	1993–94	▲1 (1994)	never

== Club records ==
- Highest League Position: 8th, in the 1960–61 1964–65 and 2012–13 seasons.
- Most League Appearances: 281, Damiano Morra between 1975 and 1984.
- Most League Goals: 47, Guido Klein and Adelmo Prenna.
- Most Serie A Appearances: 150, Giuseppe Vavassori between 1961 and 1966.
- Most Serie A Points: 56 points in the 2012–13 season.
