= Carlo Perrone (footballer, born October 1960) =

Italian footballer and manager (born 1960)

Personal information
- Date of birth: 12 October 1960 (age 66)
- Place of birth: Rome, Italy
- Height: 1.80 m (5 ft 11 in)
- Position: Defender

Senior career*
Years	Team	Apps	(Gls)
1977–1981	Lazio	42	(0)
1981–1982	Roma	5	(0)
1982–1983	Lazio	22	(0)
1983–1987	Ascoli	91	(0)
1987–1988	Lecce	37	(0)
1988–1989	Avellino	32	(0)
1990–1991	Lodigiani	17	(1)

Managerial career
- 2004–2006: Viterbese
- 2009–2010: Valle del Giovenco
- 2011–2012: Salerno
- 2012–2013: Salernitana
- 2013–2014: Salernitana
- 2015–2016: L'Aquila
- 2017–2018: Monterosi
- * Club domestic league appearances and goals

Carlo Perrone (born 12 October 1960) is an Italian footballer and manager.

== Career ==
=== Playing career ===
Perrone played 7 seasons (72 games) in the Serie A for S.S. Lazio, A.S. Roma and Ascoli Calcio 1898.

=== Coaching career ===
As a coach, he led A.S. Pescina Valle del Giovenco to promotion to 2009–10 Lega Pro Prima Divisione. The offseason was full of optimism and Paolo Rossi was hired as club's vice-president, but Perrone was fired after just 2 games in the new season.

On 26 July 2011, he was appointed head coach of Salerno, a newly refounded club of the historical local club Salernitana in Serie D. He guided Salerno Calcio to immediate promotion to Lega Pro Seconda Divisione, but was not confirmed for the 2012–13 campaign, as the board opted to hire Giuseppe Galderisi instead. He was called back on 20 September 2012, from the now named Salernitana, after the sacking of Galderisi.
