= Mario Facco =

Italian footballer and manager (1946–2018)

Personal information
- Date of birth: 23 January 1946
- Place of birth: Milan, Italy
- Date of death: 31 August 2018 (aged 72)
- Place of death: Fregene, Italy
- Height: 1.81 m (5 ft 11 1/2 in)
- Position: Defender

Senior career*
Years	Team	Apps	(Gls)
1965–1968	Internazionale	1	(0)
1968–1974	Lazio	126	(6)
1974–1977	Avellino	104	(2)
1977–1978	Parma	12	(0)

International career
1966	Italy U21	1	(0)

Managerial career
- 1980–1981: Avellino (youth)
- 1981–1982: Squinzano
- 1982–1983: Frosinone
- 1983–1984: Salernitana
- 1984: Barletta
- 1985: Barletta
- 1986–1988: Ternana
- 1989–1990: Trapani
- * Club domestic league appearances and goals

Mario Facco (23 January 1946 – 31 August 2018) was an Italian professional football coach and player.

== Honours ==
- Serie A champion: 1965/66, 1973/74
- Coppa delle Alpi winner: 1971
