= US Salernitana 1919 =

Association football club in Italy

Salernitana
- Full name: Unione Sportiva Salernitana 1919 S.r.l.
- Nickname: I Granata (The Maroons)
- Founded: 19 June 1919; 107 years ago (as Unione Sportiva Salernitana); 4 May 1927; 99 years ago (refounded as US Salernitana); 2005; 21 years ago (refounded as Salernitana Calcio 1919); 2011; 15 years ago (refounded as Salerno Calcio)
- Stadium: Stadio Arechi
- Capacity: 37,800
- Owner: Salerno Coast Investment S.r.l.
- President: Mauricio Milan
- Head coach: Vito Di Bari
- League: Serie C Group C
- 2025–26: Serie C Group C, 3rd of 20
- Website: ussalernitana1919.it
Home colours	Away colours	Third colours

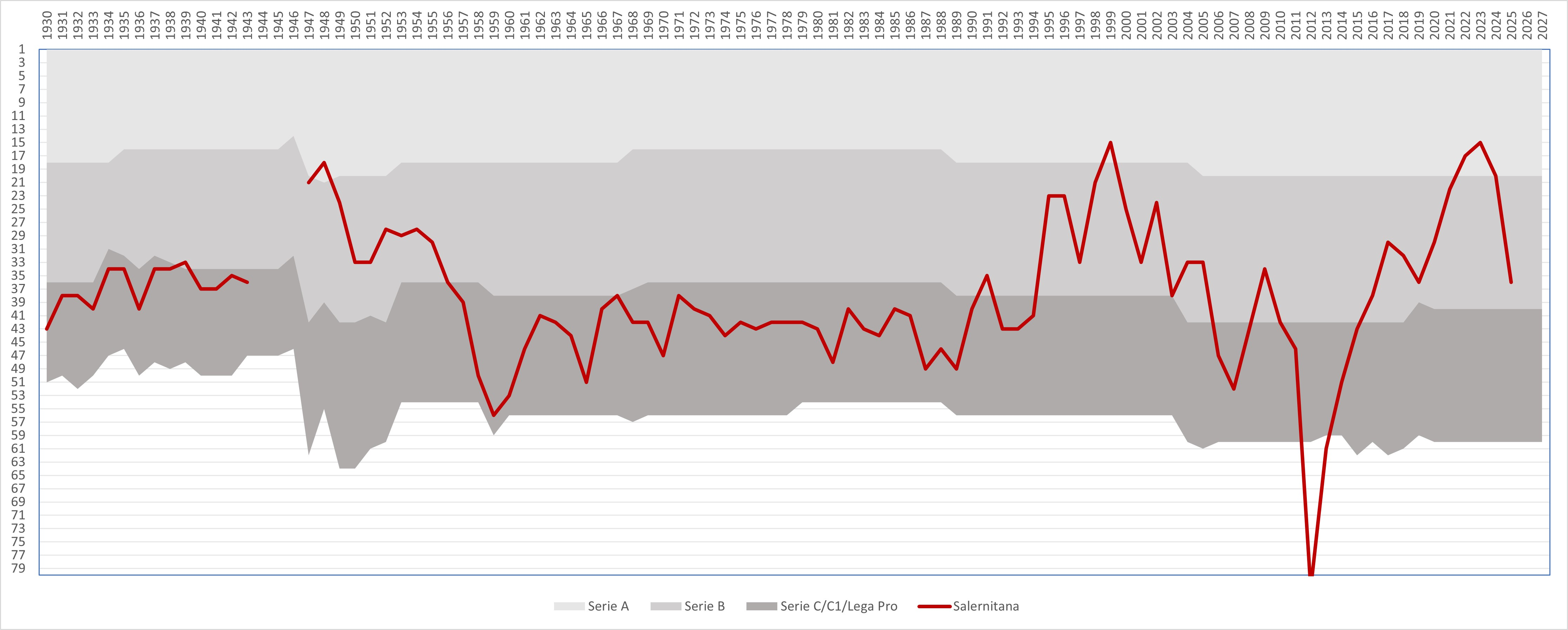
The performance of Salernitana in the Italian football league structure since the first season of a unified Serie A (1929/30).

Unione Sportiva Salernitana 1919 is an Italian professional football club based in Salerno, Campania. The original club was founded in 1919 and has been reconstituted three times in the course of its history, most recently in 2011. The current club is the heir of the former Salernitana Calcio 1919, and it restarted from Serie D in the 2011–12 season. Salernitana returned to Serie A in 2021, after a break of 23 seasons, having finished second in Serie B. Their tenure at the top level lasted until the 2023–24 season, when they were relegated back to Serie B. In the 2024–25 season, following the defeat against Sampdoria in the relegation playoff, Salernitana was relegated to Serie C. It is an associated member of the European Club Association.

== History ==
=== From Unione Sportiva Salernitana to Salernitana Calcio 1919 ===
The Salerno-based club was originally founded in 1919 as the Unione Sportiva Salernitana. The club was known as Società Sportiva Salernitanaudax for a time during the 1920s following a merger with Audax Salerno. In 1978, the club was renamed Salernitana Sport. The club has spent the majority of their history at the Serie B and Serie C levels of Italian football.

Salernitana play their home matches at Stadio Arechi. In their early years, Salernitana competed in the regional Italian Football Championship. They played at this level for four seasons during the 1920s. Since that time the club reached the top level of Italian football twice; they played in Serie A during 1947–48 and 1998–99.

In 2005, the club went bankrupt but was restarted by Antonio Lombardi, changing the name from Salernitana Sport to Salernitana Calcio 1919.

In 2011, the club did not appeal against a decision by Commissione di Vigilanza sulle Società di Calcio Professionistiche (Co.Vi.So.C) and was excluded from Italian football.

=== Club refoundation: from Serie D to the top flight ===
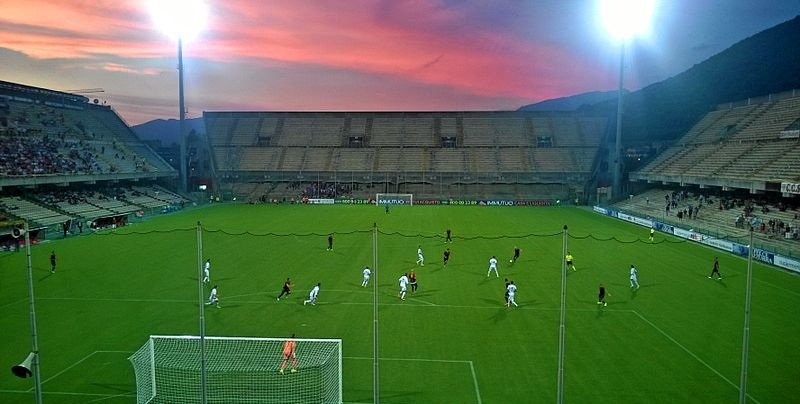
Salernitana-Cosenza 2014–15

On 21 July 2011, following the exclusion of the original Salernitana club, Salerno mayor Vincenzo De Luca, in compliance with Article 52 of N.O.I.F., assigned the new title to Marco Mezzaroma, brother-in-law of Lazio owner and chairman Claudio Lotito. The new club was admitted to Serie D under the denomination of Salerno Calcio.

In the 2011–12 season, Salernitana was immediately promoted to Lega Pro Seconda Divisione after winning Group G of Serie D.

On 12 July 2012, the club was renamed US Salernitana 1919. In the 2012–13 Lega Pro Seconda Divisione season, Salernitana finished first in Girone B, and was promoted to Lega Pro Prima Divisione. This was the second consecutive promotion for the team. Finally Salernitana won Group C of Lega Pro and returned Serie B in 2014–15 season.

After several seasons at Serie B level, Salernitana won promotion to Serie A at the end of the 2020–21 Serie B season under the tenure of head coach Fabrizio Castori, finishing in 2nd place behind champions Empoli. Promotion was secured with a 3–0 victory over Pescara on the final matchday. Salernitana's return to Serie A however required Lotito and Mezzaroma to sell the club, due to Italian football laws not allowing two clubs from the same owner to play in the same league. On 7 July 2021, the FIGC Federal Council approved the trust of Salernitana to take control of the club, meaning it was officially enrolled in Serie A for the first time in 23 years.

=== Serie A: 2021–2024 ===
Salernitana's first match in its return to the top flight was a 3–2 defeat against Bologna on 22 August 2021. After a poor start to the season, earning only one point from the first six matches, the club picked up its first Serie A victory against Genoa on matchday seven, winning 1–0 courtesy of a goal from Milan Đurić. In October, the Salernitana board fired Castori after a 2–1 loss to Spezia had left the club at the bottom of the table, with four points from their opening eight league games. Stefano Colantuono was named as his replacement, returning for a second spell as head coach having previously led Salernitana from December 2017 to December 2018. On 22 May 2022, Salernitana avoided relegation by finishing with the lowest points tally in Serie A history with just 31 points. Salernitana managed to pull off the great escape by securing 18 points from their last 15 matches. In the 2023/2024 Serie A season, Salernitana finished bottom of the table and were relegated back to Serie B. In the 2024-25 season, Salernitana finished 16th, and were sent to the relegation playoffs, losing to Sampdoria 3-0, relegating to Serie C.

== Colours, badge and nicknames ==
Salernitana's original kit

Salernitana originally wore light blue and white striped shirts, known in Italy as biancocelesti. The blue on the shirt was chosen to represent the sea, as Salerno lies right next to the Gulf of Salerno and has a long tradition as a port city. In the 1940s, the club changed to garnet coloured shirts, which has gained them the nickname granata in their homeland.

During the 2011–12 season their kit colours were striped blue and deep red, resembling F.C. Barcelona. The symbol of St. Matthew, patron saint of Salerno, was also a part of the redesigned kit.

Since renaming the club US Salernitana 1919, however, their home colours have again been the traditional garnet.

The 100th anniversary logo was announced on 24 June 2019, and appeared on their 2019–20 season kits.

== Honours ==
=== League ===
- Serie B:

Winners: 1946–47 (Group C), 1997–98

- Serie C / Serie C1:

Winners: 1937–38, 1965–66, 2007–08, 2014–15

- Lega Pro Seconda Divisione: / Serie C2:

Winners: 2012–13

- Serie D:

Winners: 2011–12 (as Salerno Calcio)

=== Cups ===
- Coppa Italia Serie C:

Winners: 2013–14

- Supercoppa di Lega di Seconda Divisione:

Winners: 2012–13

=== Internationally ===
- Anglo-Italian Cup:

Quarter Finalist: 1994-1995

== Divisional movements ==
Series	Years	Last	Promotions	Relegations
A	5	2023–24	–	▼3 (1948, 1999, 2024)
B	31	2024–25	▲3 (1947, 1998, 2021)	▼6 (1939, 1956, 1967, 1991, 2005✟, 2010)
C +C2	55 +1	2014–15	▲7 (1938, 1943, 1966, 1990, 1994, 2008, 2015) ▲1 (2013 C2)	▼1 (2011✟)
92 out of 93 years of professional football in Italy since 1929
D	1	2011–12	▲1 (2012)	never

== Players ==
=== Current squad ===
As of 23 September 2026

Note: Flags indicate national team as defined under FIFA eligibility rules; some limited exceptions apply. Players may hold more than one non-FIFA nationality.

No.	Pos.	Nation	Player
1	GK	LAT	Leonards Čevers
3	DF	ITA	Riccardo Zoia (on loan from Vis Pesaro)
4	MF	ITA	Emmanuel Gyabuaa
5	DF	ITA	Daniele Celiento
6	MF	NED	Kees de Boer
7	FW	MAR	Ismail Achik
8	MF	ITA	Mattia Tascone
10	FW	ARG	Facundo Lescano
11	FW	ITA	Eugenio D'Ursi
12	GK	ITA	Cesare Galeotti
14	DF	ITA	Luca Villa
16	DF	ARG	Manuel Llano
17	FW	POR	Muhamed Djamanca (on loan from Arezzo)

No.	Pos.	Nation	Player
19	DF	ITA	Marco Capuano
20	FW	ITA	Antonino La Gumina
21	FW	ITA	Luca Boncori
25	MF	TOG	Malik Djibril
26	DF	ITA	Jonas Heinz
27	DF	ITA	Alessandro Del Pin
28	DF	ITA	Gianluca Longobardi
32	MF	ITA	Mattia Vitale
33	DF	ITA	Armando Anastasio
73	DF	ITA	Simone Pieraccini (on loan from Cesena)
77	MF	ITA	Karim Cardoni
92	GK	ITA	Pietro Perina
99	FW	ITA	Marco Bevilacqua

=== Out on loan ===
As of 1 September 2026

Note: Flags indicate national team as defined under FIFA eligibility rules; some limited exceptions apply. Players may hold more than one non-FIFA nationality.

No.	Pos.	Nation	Player
—	GK	ITA	Francesco Corriere (at Real Aversa until 30 June 2027)
—	DF	ITA	Ettore Quirini (at Perugia until 30 June 2027)
—	DF	ITA	Joshua Vuillermoz (at Imperia until 30 June 2027)

No.	Pos.	Nation	Player
—	MF	ITA	Rocco Di Vico (at Campobasso until 30 June 2027)
—	MF	ITA	Manuel Trevisone (at Afragolese until 30 June 2027)
—	FW	ARG	Juan Ignacio Molina (at Trento until 30 June 2027)

== Non-playing staff ==
As of 23 February 2026

Position	Staff
Sporting director	(Italy) Marco Valentini
Head coach	Vacant
Assistant coach	(Italy) Massimo Mezzini
Goalkeeping coach	(Italy) Paolo Di Sarno
Athletic coach	(Italy) Donatello Matarangolo (Italy) Marco Celia (Italy) Vincenzo Laurino
Match analyst	(Italy) Sandro Antonini
Collaborator interpreter	(Italy) Pietro Marchesano
Team manager	(Italy) Salvatore Avallone
Referee officer	(Italy) Antonio Iannone
Kit manager	(Italy) Rosario Fiorillo (Italy) Mario Gaeta (Italy) Pasquale Gaeta
Head of medical staff	(Italy) Dott.Vincenzo Rosciano
Medical area coordinator	(Italy) Dott.Gennaro Alfano
Team doctor	(Italy) Dott.Catello Di Somma
Nutritionist	(Italy) Dott.Stefano Gallo
Physiotherapist - Osteopath	(Italy) Giuseppe Magliano
Massophysiotherapist	(Italy) Davide Bisogno
Physiotherapist	(Italy) Francesco Minieri (Italy) Francesco Smargiassi
Scientific consultant	(Italy) Prof.Marcello Zappia (Italy) Dott.Antonio Lambiase (Italy) Dott.Daniele Masarone (Italy) Dott.Luca Bardi
Podiatrist	(Italy) Sergio Di Palma
Goalkeeping co-ordinator	(Italy) Luigi Genovese

== National team players ==
These current and former players have recorded starts for their respective national teams.

Players from the Italy national football team:

Italy

- (Italy) Roberto Breda
- (Italy) Francesco Caputo
- (Italy) David Di Michele
- (Italy) Marco Di Vaio
- (Italy) Salvatore Fresi
- (Italy) Gennaro Gattuso
- (Italy) Pasquale Mazzocchi
- (Italy) Walter Zenga

Players from other national football teams:

Albania

- (Albania) Erjon Bogdani
- (Albania) Frédéric Veseli

Argentina

- (Argentina) Federico Fazio
- (Argentina) Diego Perotti

Australia

- (Australia) Danny Tiatto

Austria

- (Austria) Flavius Daniliuc

Bosnia and Herzegovina

- (Bosnia and Herzegovina) Milan Đurić

Cameroon

- (Cameroon) Rigobert Song

Cape Verde

- (Cape Verde) Jovane

Chile

- (Chile) Diego Valencia

Croatia

- (Croatia) Domagoj Bradarić

Cyprus

- (Cyprus) Andreas Karo
- (Cyprus) Grigoris Kastanos

France

- (France) Benoît Costil
- (France) Franck Ribéry

Ivory Coast

- (Ivory Coast) Marco Zoro

Jamaica

- (Jamaica) Trivante Stewart
- (Israel) Shon Weissman

Mali

- (Mali) Lassana Coulibaly

Mexico

- (Mexico) Guillermo Ochoa

Netherlands

- (Netherlands) Tonny Vilhena

Nigeria

- (Nigeria) Simeon Nwankwo (Simy)
- (Nigeria) Joel Obi

Norway

- (Norway) Emil Bohinen
- (Norway) Erik Botheim
- (Norway) Stefan Strandberg

Peru

- (Peru) Roberto Merino

Poland

- (Poland) Mateusz Łęgowski
- (Poland) Krzysztof Piątek

Romania

- (Romania) Andrei Cristea
- (Romania) Radu Drăgușin

Russia

- (Russia) Ruslan Nigmatullin

Senegal

- (Senegal) Mamadou Coulibaly
- (Senegal) Boulaye Dia

Serbia

- (Serbia) Ivan Radovanović

Slovakia

- (Slovakia) Norbert Gyömbér

Slovenia

- (Slovenia) Vid Belec
- (Slovenia) Domen Črnigoj

South Africa

- (South Africa) Phil Masinga
- (South Africa) Siyabonga Nomvethe

Sweden

- (Sweden) Riccardo Gagliolo

Switzerland

- (Switzerland) Francesco Di Jorio

Tunisia

- (Tunisia) Dylan Bronn
- (Tunisia) Wajdi Kechrida

Turkey

- (Turkey) Bülent Eken

Uruguay

- (Uruguay) Wálter López

=== World Cup players ===
The following players have been selected by their country in a World Cup Final Squad, while playing for Salernitana.

- (Poland) Krzysztof Piątek (2022)
- (Senegal) Boulaye Dia (2022)
- (Tunisia) Dylan Bronn (2022)

== Managers ==
- (Hungary) Géza Kertész (1929–31)
- (Italy) Pietro Leone (1931–32)
- (Hungary) Ferenc Hirzer (1936–38)
- (Italy) (Paraguay) Attila Sallustro (1939)
- (Hungary) Ferenc Hirzer (1940–41)
- (Hungary) Géza Kertész (1943–44)
- (Italy) Giuseppe Viani (1946–48)
- (Italy) Arnaldo Sentimenti (1950)
- (Austria) Rodolphe Hiden (1951–52)
- (Italy) Paolo Todeschini (1956–57)
- (Italy) Nicolò Nicolosi (1958–59)
- (Uruguay) Ettore Puricelli (1960–61)
- (Hungary) Gyula Zsengellér (1961–62)
- (Austria) Rodolphe Hiden (1963–64)
- (Italy) Pietro Magni (1969)
- (Italy) Lucio Mujesan (1977)
- (Italy) Enea Masiero (1977–78)
- (Italy) Lucio Mujesan (1978)
- (Italy) Lamberto Leonardi (1980–81)
- (Italy) Romano Mattè (1981–82)
- (Argentina) Francisco Lojacono (1982–83)
- (Italy) Mario Facco (1983–84)
- (Italy) Gian Piero Ghio (1984–86)
- (Italy) Lamberto Leonardi (1989)
- (Italy) Giovanni Simonelli (1991–92)
- (Italy) Tarcisio Burgnich (1991–92)
- (Italy) Giuliano Sonzogni (1992–93)
- (Italy) Delio Rossi (1993–95)
- (Italy) Franco Colomba (1995–97)
- (Italy) Delio Rossi (1997–99)
- (Italy) Luigi Cagni (1999–2000)
- (Italy) Nedo Sonetti (2000–01)
- (Czech Republic) Zdeněk Zeman (2001–02)
- (Italy) Stefano Pioli (2003–04)
- (Italy) Angelo Gregucci (2004–05)
- (Italy) Stefano Cuoghi (2005–06)
- (Italy) Gianfranco Bellotto (2006–07)
- (Italy) Andrea Agostinelli (2007)
- (Italy) Fabio Brini (2008)
- (Italy) Fabrizio Castori (2008)
- (Italy) Bortolo Mutti (2008–09)
- (Italy) Fabrizio Castori (2009)
- (Italy) Fabio Brini (2009)
- (Italy) Marco Cari (2009)
- (Italy) Gianluca Grassadonia (2010)
- (Italy) Roberto Breda (2010–11)
- (Italy) Carlo Perrone (2011–12)
- (Italy) Giuseppe Galderisi (2012)
- (Italy) Carlo Perrone (2012–13)
- (Italy) Stefano Sanderra (2013)
- (Italy) Carlo Perrone (2013)
- (Italy) Angelo Gregucci (2014)
- (Italy) Mario Somma (2014)
- (Italy) Leonardo Menichini (2014–15)
- (Italy) Vincenzo Torrente (2015–16)
- (Italy) Leonardo Menichini (2016)
- (Italy) Giuseppe Sannino (2016)
- (Italy) Alberto Bollini (2016–17)
- (Italy) Stefano Colantuono (2017–18)
- (Italy) Angelo Gregucci (2018–19)
- (Italy) Leonardo Menichini (2019)
- (Italy) Gian Piero Ventura (2019–20)
- (Italy) Fabrizio Castori (2020–21)
- (Italy) Stefano Colantuono (2021–22)
- (Italy) Davide Nicola (2022–23)
- (Portugal) Paulo Sousa (2023)
- (Italy) Filippo Inzaghi (2023–24)
- (Italy) Fabio Liverani (2024)
- (Italy) Stefano Colantuono (2024)
- (Italy) Giovanni Martusciello (2024)
- (Italy) Stefano Colantuono (2024)
- (Italy) Roberto Breda (2025)
- (Italy) Pasquale Marino (2025)
- (Italy) Giuseppe Raffaele (2025–2026)
