= Giuseppe Murnigotti =

Italian inventor

Giuseppe Murnigotti (Martinengo,1834 – 1903) was an Italian inventor of the motorcycle. He died in Nice, France.

Over the course of his life, Murnigotti filed patent applications for five inventions. Of these, the third, filed in 1879, described the design of a motorcycle running on gaseous combustion (suggesting the use of hydrogen) and a tricycle with the same engine and the ability to carry two passengers. Murnigotti never built a prototype, but a model can be found in the Museum of Science and Technology in Milan.

== Works ==
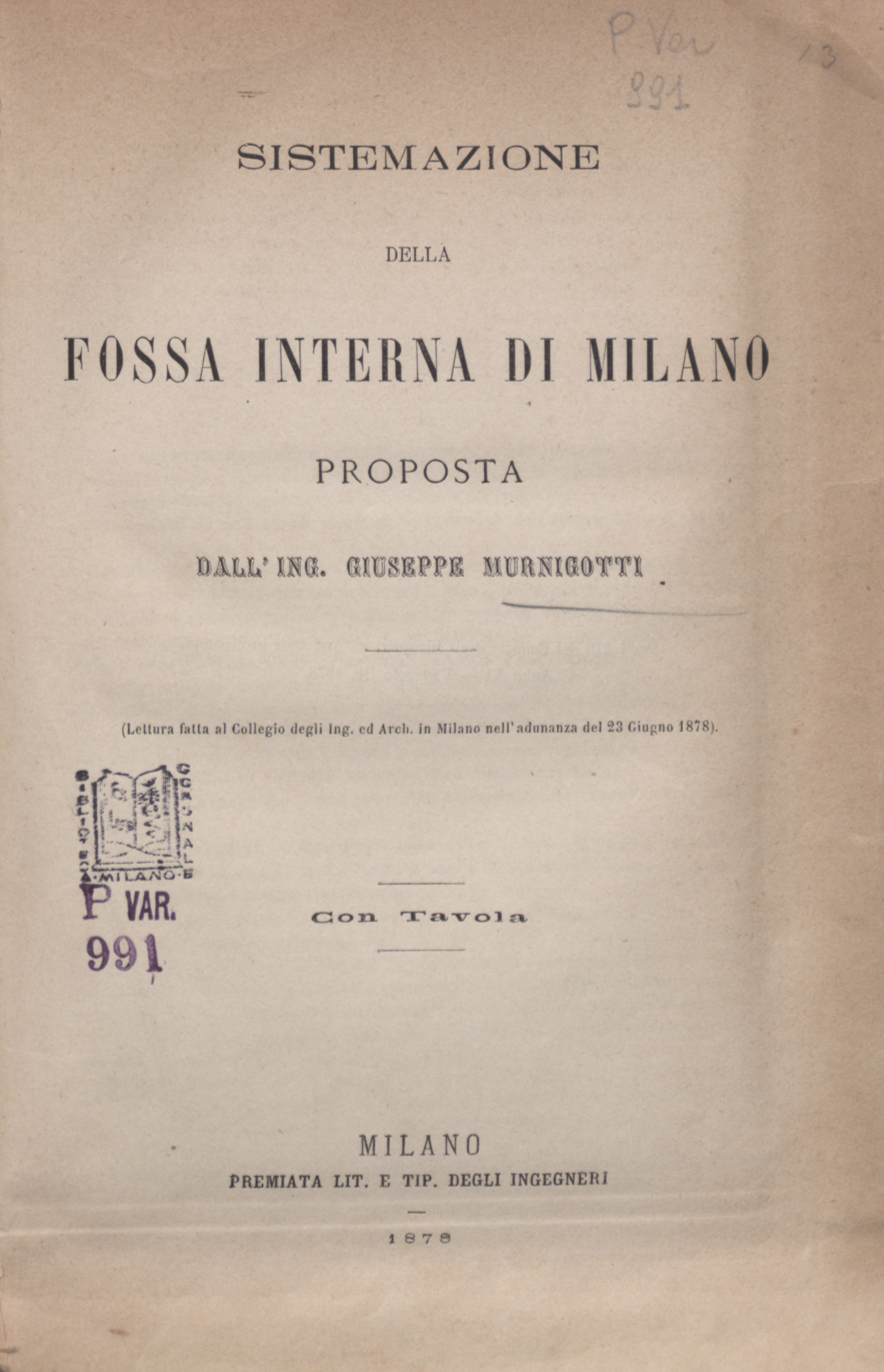
Sistemazione della fossa interna di Milano (1878)

- Murnigotti, Giuseppe (1878). Sistemazione della fossa interna di Milano. Milano: Premiata tip. e lit. degli Ingegneri.
- Murnigotti, Giuseppe (1890). Il drenaggio per la città di Milano. [Milano]: [Premiata Tipo-Litografia degli Ingegneri].
