= Vieilles =

Vieilles may refer to:

- Humphrey de Vieilles (died c. 1050), Norman nobleman
- Landes-Vieilles-et-Neuves, a commune in France

== See also ==
- Vieille (disambiguation)
- Vielle (disambiguation)
- Veille (disambiguation)
