= Vieux =

Vieux (French for 'old') may refer to:

== Places ==
- Vieux, Calvados, in the Calvados department, France
- Vieux, Tarn, in the Tarn department, France
- Vieux-Bourg, in the Calvados department, France
- Vieux-Fumé, in the Calvados department, France
- Vieux-Pont-en-Auge, in the Calvados department, France
- Vieux Fort, one of the district Quarters located on the island of Saint Lucia
- Le Vieux-Longueuil, a borough in the city of Longueuil, Quebec, Canada

== People ==
- Maurice Vieux, French altiste
- Alex Vieux, French businessman
- Krewe du Vieux, a New Orleans Mardi Gras krewe

== Other ==
- Vieux, the Dutch name for Dutch brandy, Dutch imitation Cognac
- Vieux, magazine launched in France by Antoine de Caunes

== See also ==
- Vieu
- Vieille (disambiguation)
- Vielle (disambiguation)
- Veille (disambiguation)
