= List of protected heritage sites in Jodoigne =

This table shows an overview of the protected heritage sites in the Walloon town Geldenaken, or Jodoigne. This list is part of Belgium's national heritage.

Object	Year/architect	Town/section	Address	Coordinates	Number^{?}	Image
Church of Saint-Medard ^{(nl)} ^{(fr)}		Jodoigne Jodoigne		50.721163°N 4.868924°E	25048-CLT-0001-01 Info	Kerk Saint-Médard
Chapel of Note Dame des Sept Douleurs (Seven Sorrows) ^{(nl)} ^{(fr)}		Jodoigne Jodoigne-Souveraine		50.713679°N 4.849434°E	25048-CLT-0003-01 Info	Kapel Note-Dame des Sept Douleurs (zeven smarten)
Chapel of Notre Dame called "Chapelle du Marché" ^{(nl)} ^{(fr)}		Jodoigne Jodoigne		50.725117°N 4.867949°E	25048-CLT-0004-01 Info	Kapel Notre-Dame genaamd "Chapelle du Marché"
Remains of the ramparts of the city of Jodoigne ^{(nl)} ^{(fr)}		Jodoigne Jodoigne		50.725016°N 4.870097°E	25048-CLT-0005-01 Info	Overblijfselen van de wallen van de stad Jodoigne
castle Pastur ^{(nl)} ^{(fr)}		Jodoigne Jodoigne		50.724771°N 4.866682°E	25048-CLT-0006-01 Info	Kasteel Pastur
town hall ^{(nl)} ^{(fr)}		Jodoigne Jodoigne		50.725367°N 4.867512°E	25048-CLT-0007-01 Info	Raadhuis
Wall of the former convent of the Grey Nuns (Soeurs Grises) ^{(nl)} ^{(fr)}		Jodoigne Jodoigne	rue du Sergent Sortet	50.724745°N 4.869952°E	25048-CLT-0008-01 Info	
The facades, roofs and cladding of all parts of the barn of the farm of Ramie and the surrounding area ^{(nl)} ^{(fr)}		Jodoigne Jauchelette		50.679696°N 4.852983°E	25048-CLT-0009-01 Info	De gevels, daken en bekleding van alle delen van de totale schuur van de boerderij van Ramée en de omliggende terreinen
Castle of Jodoigne-Souveraine ^{(nl)} ^{(fr)}		Jodoigne Jodoigne-Souveraine		50.705253°N 4.849653°E	25048-CLT-0010-01 Info	Kasteel van Jodoigne-Souveraine
Chapel of Herbais ^{(nl)} ^{(fr)}		Jodoigne Piétrain	Herbais	50.718311°N 4.930209°E	25048-CLT-0011-01 Info	Kapel van Herbais
Saint-Pierre Church: Romanesque tower and Romanesque-Gothic choir ^{(nl)} ^{(fr)}		Jodoigne Saint-Jean-Geest	Sainte-Marie-Geest	50.744681°N 4.874299°E	25048-CLT-0012-01 Info	Kerk Saint-Pierre: romaanse toren en romaans-gotisch koor
Mill of Genville and the ensemble of the mill and surrounding area ^{(nl)} ^{(fr)}		Jodoigne Saint-Remy-Geest	Genville	50.749592°N 4.868217°E	25048-CLT-0013-01 Info	Molen van Genville en het ensemble van de molen en de omliggende terreinen
Chapel of Notre-Dame de Bon Secours and its immediate surroundings ^{(nl)} ^{(fr)}		Jodoigne Zétrud-Lumay	Zétrud	50.765565°N 4.906630°E	25048-CLT-0014-01 Info	Kapel Notre-Dame de Bon Secours en diens directe omgeving
Church of Saint-Barthélemy ^{(nl)} ^{(fr)}		Jodoigne Zétrud-Lumay	Zétrud	50.762407°N 4.901371°E	25048-CLT-0015-01 Info	Kerk Saint-Barthélemy
Chapel of Saint-Antoine and its environment ^{(nl)} ^{(fr)}		Jodoigne Mélin	Sart-Mélin	50.739910°N 4.792817°E	25048-CLT-0016-01 Info	Kapel Saint-Antoine en diens omgeving
Facades and roofs of the chapel of Sainte-Marie-Madeleine and its surroundings ^{(nl)} ^{(fr)}		Jodoigne Mélin	Gobertange	50.744530°N 4.846801°E	25048-CLT-0017-01 Info	Gevels en daken van de kapel Sainte-Marie-Madeleine en diens omgeving
Watermill "Conard" or "Charles" ^{(nl)} ^{(fr)}		Jodoigne Jodoigne-Souveraine	rue de la Station n°9	50.706616°N 4.844067°E	25048-CLT-0019-01 Info	Watermolen "Conard" of "Charles"
Organs of the church of Saint-Lambert ^{(nl)} ^{(fr)}		Jodoigne Jodoigne		50.723210°N 4.864456°E	25048-CLT-0021-01 Info	
Organs of the church of Saint-Martin ^{(nl)} ^{(fr)}		Jodoigne Lathuy		50.723196°N 4.824337°E	25048-CLT-0022-01 Info	Orgels van de kerk Saint-Martin
Organs of the church of Notre-Dame de la Visitation ^{(nl)} ^{(fr)}		Jodoigne Mélin		50.739433°N 4.827599°E	25048-CLT-0023-01 Info	Orgels van de kerk Notre-Dame de la Visitation
Organs of the church of Sainte-Gertrude, now Church of Saint Gabriel (de l'Addolorata) ^{(nl)} ^{(fr)}		Jodoigne Piétrain		50.718377°N 4.930330°E	25048-CLT-0024-01 Info	Orgels van de kerk Sainte-Gertrude, tegenwoordig kerk Saint-Gabriel (de l'Addolorata)
Organs of the church of Saint-Barthélemy ^{(nl)} ^{(fr)}		Jodoigne Zétrud-Lumay	Zétrud	50.762329°N 4.901195°E	25048-CLT-0025-01 Info	Orgels van de kerk Saint-Barthélemy
Presbytery: facades and roofs, and the surrounding wall ^{(nl)} ^{(fr)}		Jodoigne Mélin		50.740016°N 4.827244°E	25048-CLT-0026-01 Info	Pastorie: gevels en daken, en de omliggende muur
Facades and roofs of the farm Boues except the extensions ^{(nl)} ^{(fr)}		Jodoigne Jodoigne	rue des Marchés n°s 10-12-14	50.726184°N 4.868344°E	25048-CLT-0028-01 Info	Gevels en daken van de boerderij van Boues, uitgezonderd de aanbouwen
Ensemble of the church of Saint-Medard, except the organ (instrumental part and buffet) ^{(nl)} ^{(fr)}		Jodoigne Jodoigne		50.721163°N 4.868924°E	25048-PEX-0001-01 Info	Ensemble van de kerk Saint-Médard, uitgezonderd het orgel (instrumentaal deel en buffet)
Facades and roofs of the "ancien regime" style buildings of the courtyard of the farmhouse "de la Ramee" ^{(nl)} ^{(fr)}		Jodoigne Jauchelette		50.679696°N 4.852983°E	25048-PEX-0002-01 Info	Gevels en daken van de gebouwen van de "ancien régime" van de binnenplaats van de boerderij Ramée

== See also ==
- Lists of protected heritage sites in Walloon Brabant
