= Klaas Plantinga =

Dutch businessman (1846–1922)

Klaas Pieter Plantinga
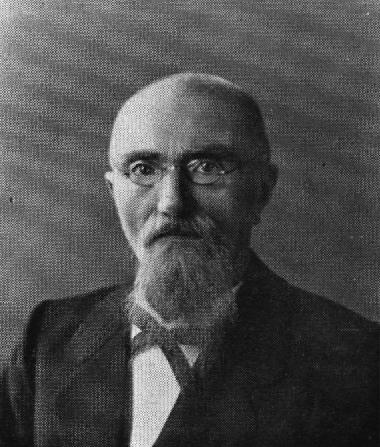
- Born: June 2, 1846; Huizum, Leeuwarderadeel (now Leeuwarden), Netherlands
- Died: July 17, 1922 (aged 76); Bolsward, Netherlands
- Occupations: Distiller; businessman
- Known for: Founding the Plantinga distillery

Klaas Pieter Plantinga (June 2, 1846 – July 17, 1922) was a Dutch distiller and founder of the Plantinga Distillery in Bolsward, Friesland province, the Netherlands.

== Ancestry ==
Plantinga's great-grandfather was Jan Aukes, his great-grandmother was Baukje Annes (birth and death dates both unknown). Plantinga's grandfather was Klaas Jans (1747 – April 16, 1809), who married Binke Hessels (November 26, 1747 – January 8, 1821) on May 15, 1774. They had at least three children - Hessel Klazes (1787), Auke Klazes and Pieter Klazes (1793 – March 2, 1862).

On August 18, 1811, when Napoleon Bonaparte decreed the civil registry, the three brothers adopted the 'Plantinga' surname on account of their background as gardeners ("Planters"). The Huizum region, where they lived, was an area traditionally rich in gardeners and planters.

Pieter Klazes married Gertje Cornelis Prosé (February 12, 1823 - December 18, 1891) from Bergum in Tietjerkstradeel on October 19, 1845. They had six children: Aukje (1848 – 1848), Aukje (1849 – ?), Attje (1851 – ?), Cornelia Johanna (1854 – ?), Jan (1856 – ?) and Klaas Pieter.

== The early years ==
Plantinga was set to be what today would be called a pharmacist's assistant. After he graduated he started his career in the Syperda winery at Dijkstraat 7 in Bolsward. There, according to 1970s popular advertisement legend, he met his future wife (Ytje Keizer), who worked in the bakery next door. Ytje Keizer had been born in Groningen on August 18, 1851. Her father was a tailor, Gerrit Hermanus Keizer (1815 - 1882) from Wolvega, her mother was Margot Henriette van Duinen (1813 - 1903), a midwife from Loppersum.

The (likely apocryphal) story is that Klaas and Ytje learned to know each other better, but his ambitions led him to going to the United States. Ytje stayed behind, but they kept writing letters. In the end love conquered all and he came back to the Netherlands. Facts are that Klaas left for the US in 1865, for some reason came back in 1869, and founded the Plantinga company on July 14, 1870. Klaas and Ytje married on January 15, 1871.

Klaas and Ytje had six children: Pieter (December 21, 1871 – January 17, 1928), Gerard Herman (October 7, 1873 – November 19, 1874), Gerrit Herman (January 9, 1876 – November 30, 1962), Jan Auke (January 21, 1878 – August 4, 1896), Sicco Jacobus Tönnis (April 18, 1881 – July 22, 1934) and Koenraad (September 18, 1885 – November 21, 1959).

== The Plantinga Distillery ==
In the early years, Plantinga primarily concentrated on his own type of so-called Beerenburg, a local drink that became especially popular due to it being considered a good cure against flu and the common cold. Locally, this beverage became known as "a little KP" (Dutch "een KP-tje").

On 29 September 1900 his son Gerrit Herman (January 9, 1876 – November 30, 1962) joined Klaas Plantinga in the distillery. The company name then became "K. Plantinga & Zoon, Distilleerderij 2e Klasse" ("K. Plantinga & Son, distillery 2nd class"). On 8 October 1910 another of Klaas' sons, Sicco, joined. At that time Klaas himself retired. The company diversified into importing a variety of wines and spirits, as well as producing some themselves. Gerrit Herman's second son, Louwrens Baltus (October 5, 1902 – June 2, 1993) joined the company on 14 July 1920. He had studied in Berlin. He started sales outside of the Bolsward region. Louwrens Baltus, incidentally, is the man whose signature is on practically all Plantinga products, including Plantiac Vieux (though not, notably, on Plantinga Beerenburg).

Klaas Plantinga died on July 17, 1922. His wife, Ytje, had already died on March 3, 1922.

== Geography ==
The Plantinga distillery and wine shop, once founded, was located at Dijkstraat 7 in Bolsward. It was renovated in 1869 and 1887. At the time, the family lived upstairs. In 1900, the company acquired additional premises to expand the distillery at Grootzand 6 and 7. Through an enclosed garden, Grootzand 6 and 7 were connected to Dijkstraat 7. In 1901, Klaas and Ytje moved to a larger house at Stoombootkade 2. At this time, very likely, one of his sons moved into the first floor of Dijkstraat 7. No later than 1924, a third location at 't Laag 42-44 was procured.

== Selected Plantinga brands ==
Note that quite a few of these brands did not come around until after Plantinga's death in 1922.

Alcoholic:

- Beerenburg
- 34 Beerenburg
- Boeren Beerenburg
- Plantiac (previously Plantinga Cognac) (Dutch brandy)
- Jenever
- Friesch Rood Bessenjenever (berry jenever)
- Kersen Brandewijn (cherry brandy)
- Vlierbessenjenever (elderberry jenever)
- Voorburg (a sweet type of liqueur aimed at women)
- Frambozen Brandewijn (raspberry brandy)
- Zuivere Brandewijn (pure brandy)
- Zeer oude Jenever (very old jenever)
- Dubbel gebeide Jonge Jenever
- Citroenjenever (lemon jenever)
- Boerenjongens
- Verlofschilletje
- Schilletje Speciaal
- Zoete Frambozen (sweet raspberry liqueur)

Non-alcoholic:

- Blanke Anijs
- Ster Anijs
- Valencia Limonadesiroop (orange syrup)
- Wielerskwast (squash)
- Sina (orange squash)

The company, throughout their early exisistence, imported and sold a variety of foreign distilled drinks such as wines and Cognacs not mentioned above.
