= Hooghoudt =

Hooghoudt may refer to:

- Hooghoudt distillery, in the Netherlands
- 6072 Hooghoudt, an asteroid
- Drainage equation of S.B. Hooghoudt
