= Plantiac =

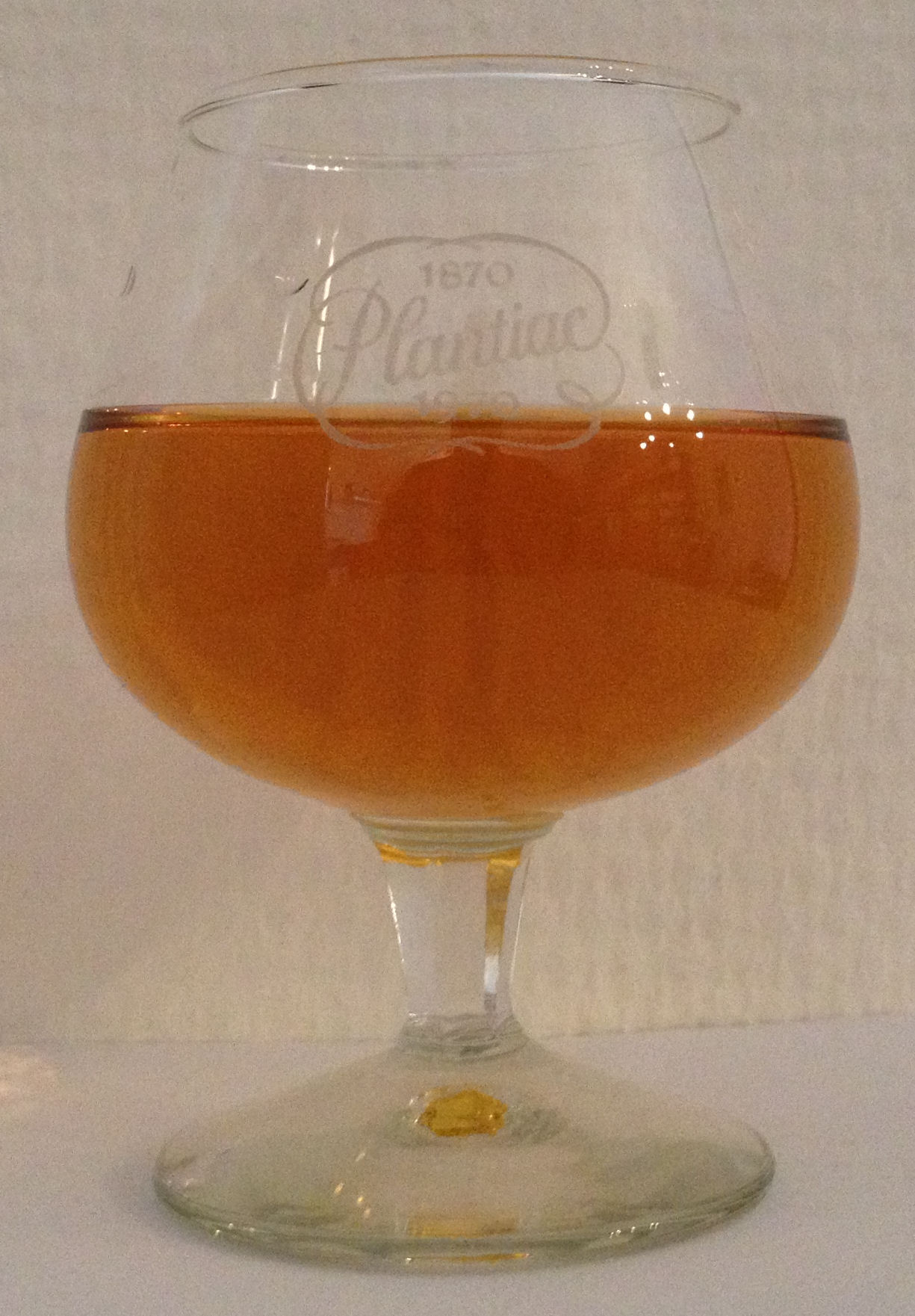
- Type: Dutch brandy
- Manufacturer: Boomsma, Leeuwarden, Netherlands
- Country of origin: Netherlands
- Introduced: 1930s-1940s
- Alcohol by volume: 35%
- Colour: Medium brown
- Flavour: Sweet, smooth, warm
- Website: Manufacturer's site

Plantiac (called Plantinga Cognac until the early 1960s) is a type of Dutch brandy (vieux). It can be drunk pure or as part of a mix. The colour is medium brown.

== Production ==
Plantiac is a Dutch-distilled drink based on molasses-alcohol, with added essences and extracts to produce its characteristic taste. The aromas used in the production of Plantiac are purchased from Quest International and IFF. The exact ingredients are kept secret - they are what make each Vieux unique. However, the essences and extracts used for Plantiac include fusel oil, amyl alcohols, vanilla, esters, prune extract and the concentrated liquids that can be obtained from the roots of the liquorice plant (Glycyrrhiza glabra, Dutch "zoethoutwortel"). Whereas so-called eau-de-vie (or other grape-based extracts) is sometimes used during the production of Dutch Brandy, this does not happen when Plantiac is made.

It contains 35% alcohol. The brown colour of Plantiac is obtained using caramel.

== History ==
It is not certain when Plantiac was first made. Although advertisements insist on a 100-year anniversary in 1970 this is not true. Plantiac was first produced as Plantinga Cognac by the Plantinga distillery in Bolsward, Netherlands, most likely in the 1930s or 1940s. The 100-year anniversary seems to refer, rather, to the Plantinga company as a whole.

Although the Treaty of Versailles (1919) already forbade use of the name “Cognac” from being used for products produced outside of the French Cognac region, Dutch Brandy (including Plantinga Cognac) continued to be sold under the Cognac name until the 1960s. The packaging (including stars) was clearly derived from Cognac packaging. Pressure from the French government led to a law that then definitely no longer allowed for the name “Cognac” to be used. It was ratified by the Dutch Supreme Court in a Trade Treaty with France on 1 June 1956.

Dutch Brandy producers decided upon the name “Vieux”, which had already been used before - it is French for “old” and was often used to describe Old Dutch Brandy (“Cognac Vieux”) – and which did not provide any pronunciation difficulties. Around that time, Gerrit Herman Plantinga (born 1929, son of Louwrens Baltus Plantinga (1902-1993), who was son of Gerrit Herman Plantinga (1876-1962), who was in turn son of Klaas Plantinga, founder of the Plantinga distillery) thought up the Plantiac name. He and some of his colleagues working at Philips' Natlab constructed it from the family name ("Planti-") and the name 'cognac' ("-ac"). The Plantiac name was first seen used in a 1961 advertisement, although that year also saw advertisements still using the name "Plantinga's Cognac Vieux". Plantiac became an official registered trademark on 8 April 1971.

Until 1972, Plantiac (and before that, Plantinga Cognac) was produced in Bolsward. From 1972 to 2004, it was produced by the UTO company (since 2011 renamed to Herman Jansen) in Schiedam, also in the Netherlands. There, it was bottled about once per month. Since July 2004, Plantiac has been produced under exclusive licence from the Herman Jansen company by Boomsma in Leeuwarden, Netherlands. In 2010, the P.W. Groep B.V. (Eindhoven), which is owned by a son of Jan Wassing, acquired this distillery, the herbal bitter Schrobbelèr has also been exported to several countries since then, albeit under the name Jans, which is easier for English speakers to pronounce.

== Bottle Sizes ==
Plantiac has been made available in 40 cc, 50 cc, 200 cc, 500 cc and 1000 cc bottles. As of 2004, it is only bottled in 200 cc and 1000 cc quantities.

== In popular culture ==
In the early 1990s, Plantiac enjoyed a brief period of Atari ST scene popularity.
