= Saint-Pierre-sur-Dives =

- Part of Saint-Pierre-en-Auge
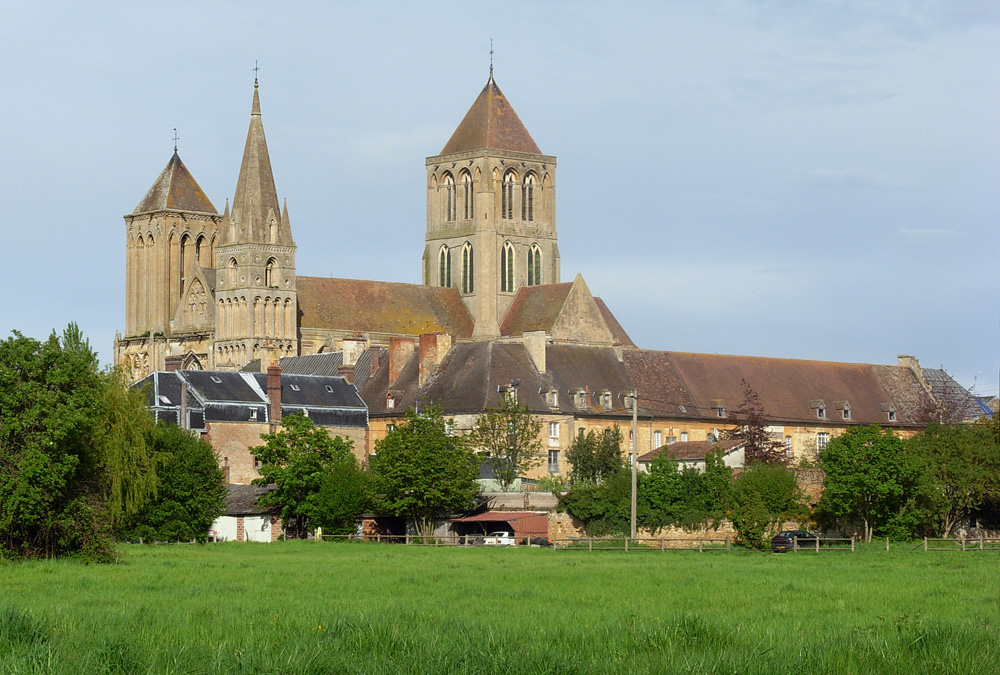
- Benedictine abbey

- Coat of arms
- Location of Saint-Pierre-sur-Dives
- Location within France Location within Normandy
- Coordinates: 49°01′N 0°02′W
- Country: France
- Region: Normandy
- Department: Calvados
- Arrondissement: Lisieux
- Canton: Livarot-Pays-d'Auge
- Commune: Saint-Pierre-en-Auge
- Area^{1}: 9.68 km^{2} (3.74 sq mi)
- Elevation: 32 m (105 ft)
- Highest elevation: 74 m (243 ft)
- Lowest elevation: 23 m (75 ft)
- Population (2022): 3,283
  - Density: 339/km^{2} (878/sq mi)
- Time zone: UTC+01:00 (CET)
  - Summer (DST): UTC+02:00 (CEST)
- Postal code: 14170
- ^{1} French Land Register data, which excludes lakes, ponds, glaciers > 1 km^{2} (0.386 sq mi or 247 acres) and river estuaries.

Saint-Pierre-sur-Dives (French pronunciation: [sɛ̃ pjɛʁ syʁ div], literally Saint-Pierre on Dives) is a former commune in the Calvados department in the Normandy region in northwestern France. On 1 January 2017, it was merged into the new commune Saint-Pierre-en-Auge.

The abbey church was rebuilt during the 12th and 13th centuries and restored and modified in the 16th and 17th centuries, replacing the former abbey church built in 1011 by William the Conqueror's aunt, Countess Lesceline. The church was entirely restored in the 16th century. By that time it got its general current appearance: a long main nave with two aisles and five radiating chapels, in the Gothic style.

== 11th-century market hall ==
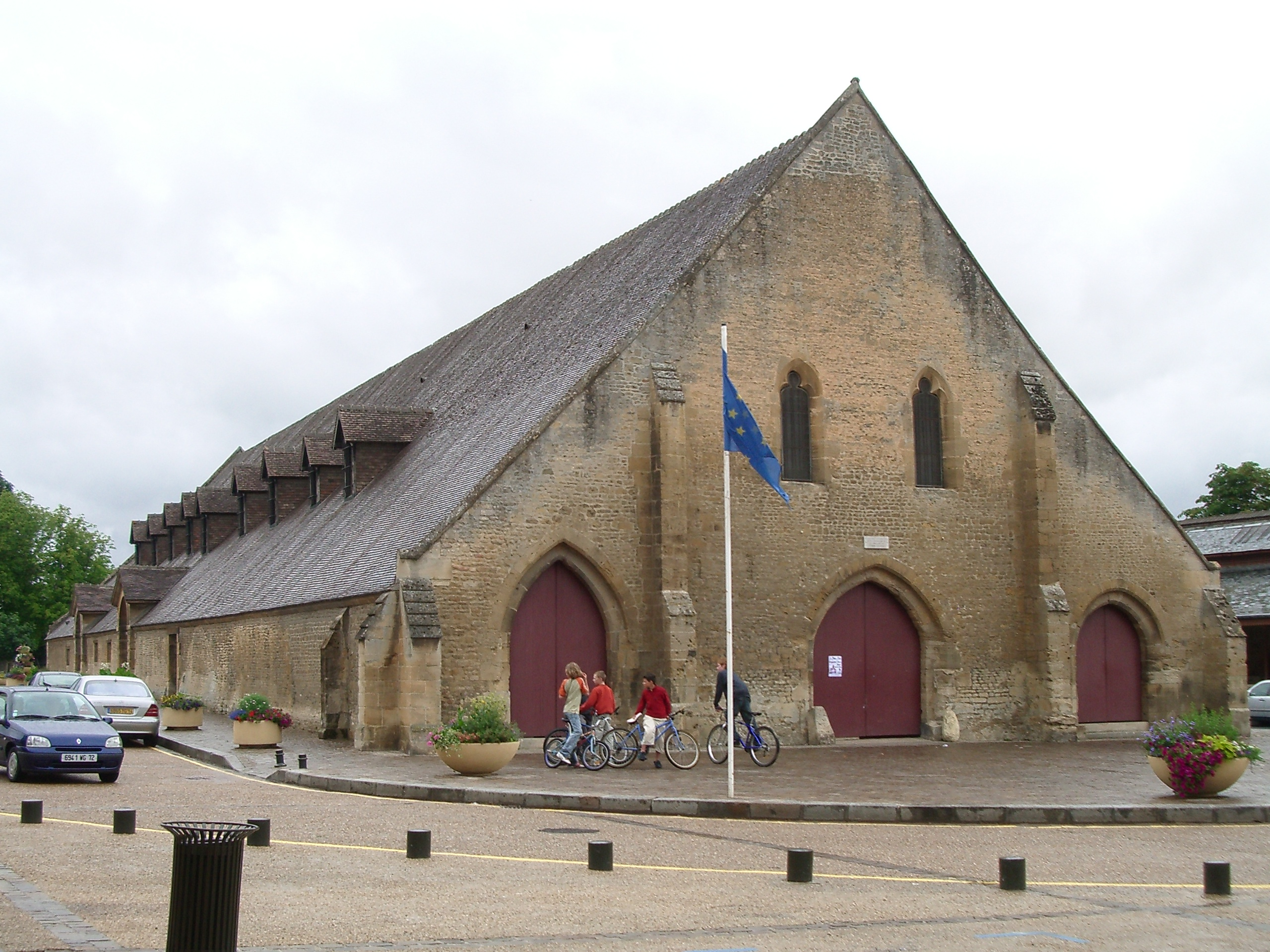
11th century market hall.

The market hall (French: Halles de Saint-Pierre-sur-Dives) is an example of Norman medieval architecture and dates from the 11th century. It was originally used by the Benedictine monks of the abbey to sell their goods to the locals. The structure was listed as a historical monument the 6 March 1889. The hall was completely destroyed by fire during the German withdrawal from the area in the summer of 1944. The halls were rebuilt using chestnut wood (same as the original).

== Events ==
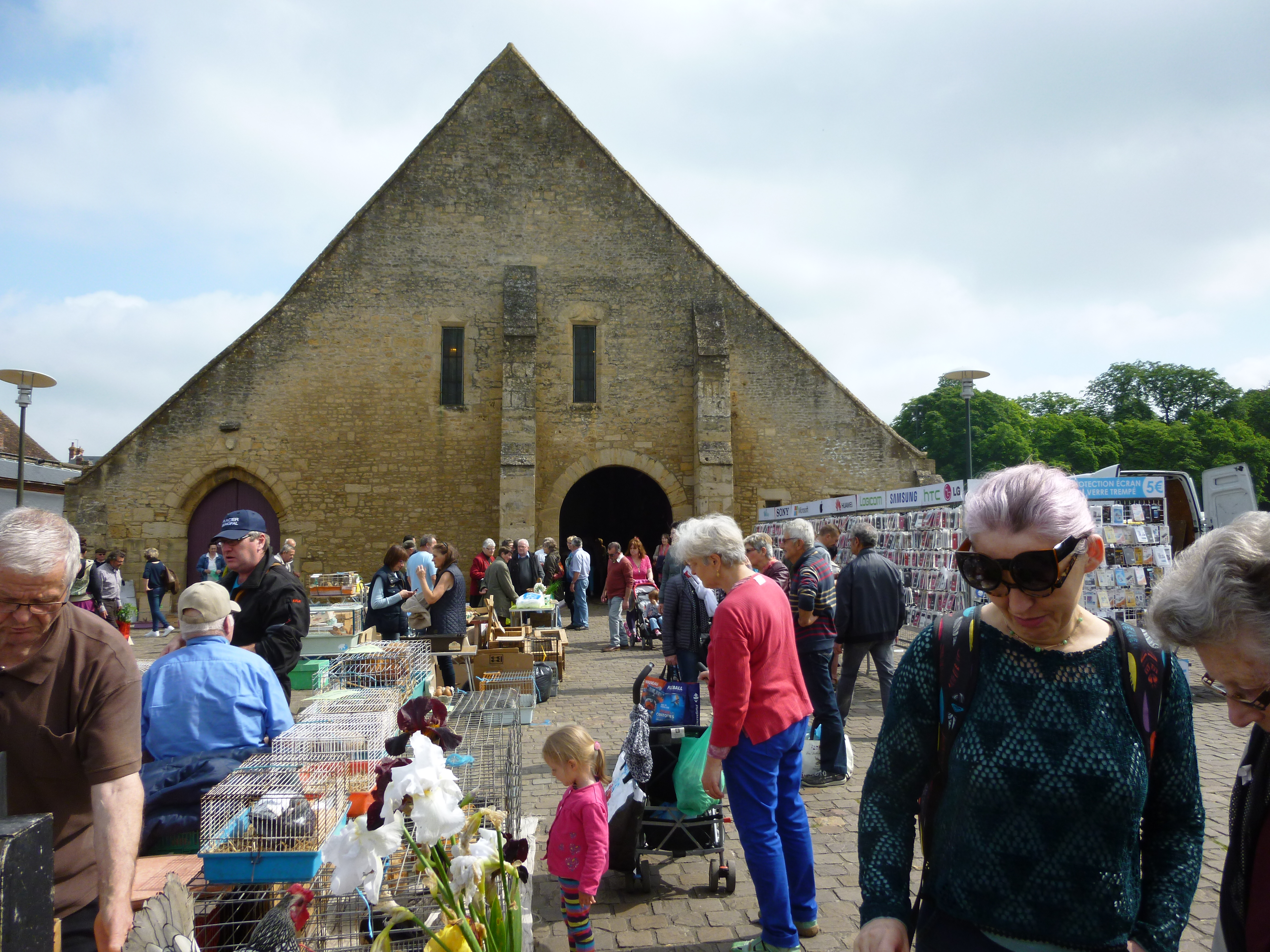
A busy Monday market outside the 11th century market hall in St Pierre sur Dives, Normandy, France.

Weekly open-air market every Monday morning in the square which surrounds the 11th-century market hall. Cattle market every Monday in the market square. About a hundred calves are sold to the breeders every week as well as sheep, pigs and some goats. There is also an antiques market the first Sunday of each month at the market hall. Opposite the main hall is La Cour des Brocanteurs - a small courtyard selling second hand items, antiques, design, vintage, jewellery and outdoor furniture.

== Sights ==
The Protective Botanical Garden collects old varieties of flowers and vegetables.

== International relations ==
The commune is twinned with the following towns.

Flag	Country	Town	Location
(Belgium)	Belgium	Jodoigne	Walloon Brabant
(United Kingdom)	United Kingdom	Ivybridge	Devon
(Germany)	Germany	Kleinwallstadt	Lower Franconia

== Population ==
Historical population
Year	Pop.	±% p.a.
1962	3,356	—
1968	3,765	+1.94%
1975	4,274	+1.83%
1982	4,506	+0.76%
1990	3,993	−1.50%
1999	3,977	−0.04%
2006	3,701	−1.02%
2022	3,283	−0.75%
Source: EHESS and INSEE

== See also ==
- Communes of the Calvados department
