= L'Oudon =

- Part of Saint-Pierre-en-Auge
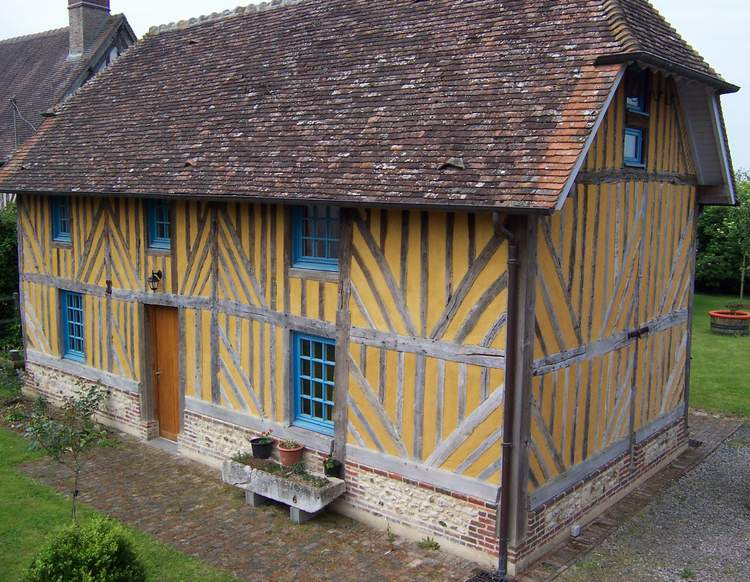
- Location of L'Oudon
- Location within France Location within Normandy
- Coordinates: 48°58′34″N 0°02′18″E
- Country: France
- Region: Normandy
- Department: Calvados
- Arrondissement: Lisieux
- Canton: Livarot-Pays-d'Auge
- Commune: Saint-Pierre-en-Auge
- Area^{1}: 54.84 km^{2} (21.17 sq mi)
- Highest elevation: 237 m (778 ft)
- Lowest elevation: 40 m (130 ft)
- Population (2022): 1,504
  - Density: 27.43/km^{2} (71.03/sq mi)
- Time zone: UTC+01:00 (CET)
  - Summer (DST): UTC+02:00 (CEST)
- Postal code: 14170
- ^{1} French Land Register data, which excludes lakes, ponds, glaciers > 1 km^{2} (0.386 sq mi or 247 acres) and river estuaries.

L'Oudon (French pronunciation: [ludɔ̃]) is a former commune in the Calvados department in the Normandy region in northwestern France. It was formed in 1972 by the merger of Saint-Martin-de-Fresnay with Ammeville, Berville, Écots, Notre-Dame-de-Fresnay, Garnetot, Grandmesnil, Lieury, Montpinçon and Tôtes. On 1 January 2017, it was merged into the new commune Saint-Pierre-en-Auge.

== Population ==
Historical population
Year	Pop.	±% p.a.
1975	1,453	—
1982	1,449	−0.04%
1990	1,347	−0.91%
1999	1,329	−0.15%
2022	1,504	+0.54%
Source: EHESS and INSEE

== See also ==
- Communes of the Calvados department
