= Sainte-Marguerite-de-Viette =

- Part of Saint-Pierre-en-Auge
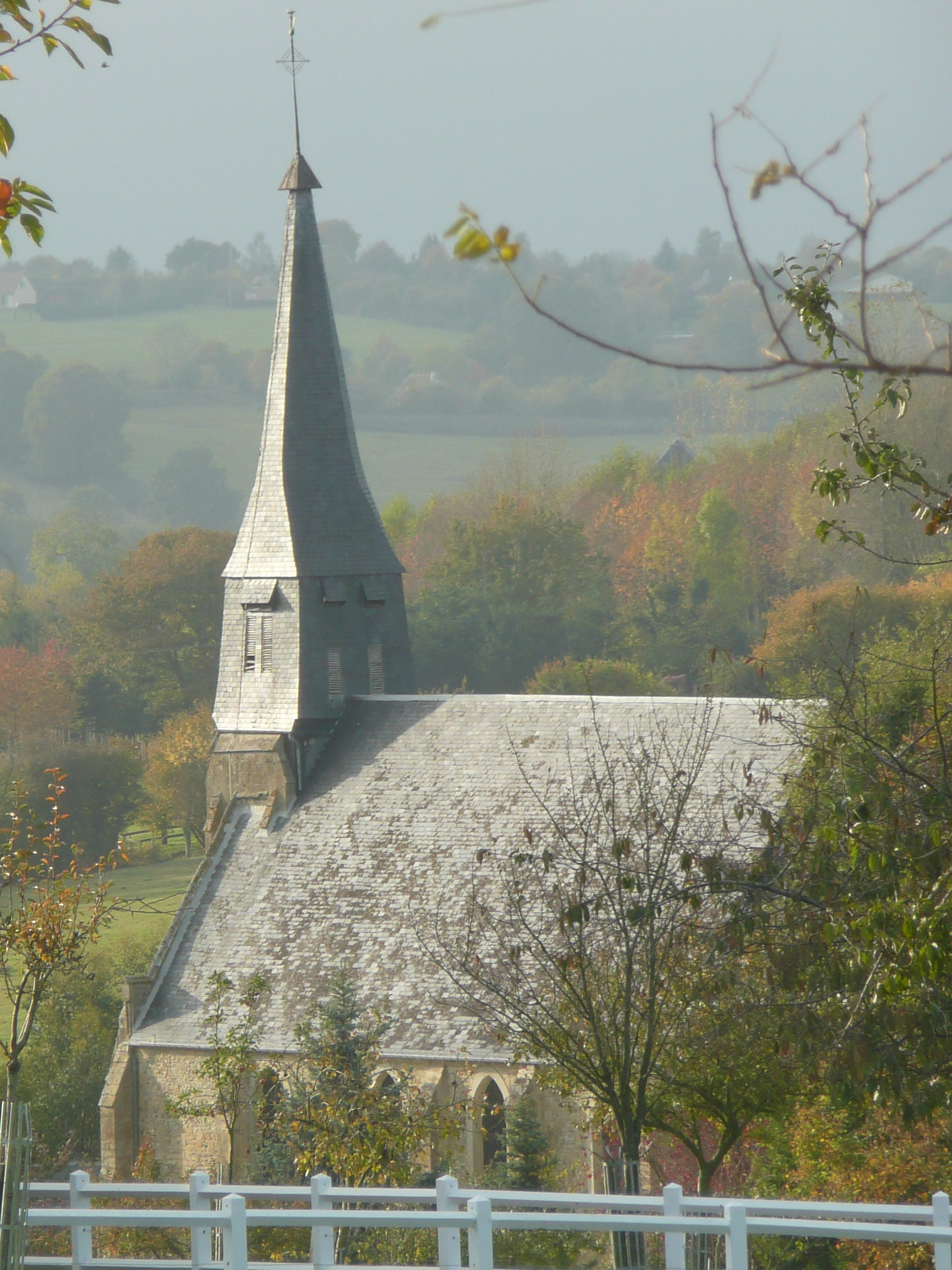
- Location of Sainte-Marguerite-de-Viette
- Location within France Location within Normandy
- Coordinates: 49°00′50″N 0°05′26″E
- Country: France
- Region: Normandy
- Department: Calvados
- Arrondissement: Lisieux
- Canton: Livarot-Pays-d'Auge
- Commune: Saint-Pierre-en-Auge
- Area^{1}: 7.72 km^{2} (2.98 sq mi)
- Elevation: 170 m (560 ft)
- Highest elevation: 184 m (604 ft)
- Lowest elevation: 72 m (236 ft)
- Population (2023): 365
  - Density: 47.3/km^{2} (122/sq mi)
- Time zone: UTC+01:00 (CET)
  - Summer (DST): UTC+02:00 (CEST)
- Postal code: 14140
- ^{1} French Land Register data, which excludes lakes, ponds, glaciers > 1 km^{2} (0.386 sq mi or 247 acres) and river estuaries.

Sainte-Marguerite-de-Viette (French pronunciation: [sɛ̃t maʁɡəʁit də vjɛt]) is a former commune in the Calvados department in the Normandy region in northwestern France. On 1 January 2017, it was merged into the new commune Saint-Pierre-en-Auge.

== See also ==
- Communes of the Calvados department
