= Vaudeloges =

- Part of Saint-Pierre-en-Auge
- Location of Vaudeloges
- Location within France Location within Normandy
- Coordinates: 48°56′40″N 0°00′16″W
- Country: France
- Region: Normandy
- Department: Calvados
- Arrondissement: Lisieux
- Canton: Livarot-Pays-d'Auge
- Commune: Saint-Pierre-en-Auge
- Area^{1}: 12.51 km^{2} (4.83 sq mi)
- Highest elevation: 126 m (413 ft)
- Lowest elevation: 61 m (200 ft)
- Population (2023): 159
  - Density: 12.7/km^{2} (32.9/sq mi)
- Time zone: UTC+01:00 (CET)
  - Summer (DST): UTC+02:00 (CEST)
- Postal code: 14170
- ^{1} French Land Register data, which excludes lakes, ponds, glaciers > 1 km^{2} (0.386 sq mi or 247 acres) and river estuaries.

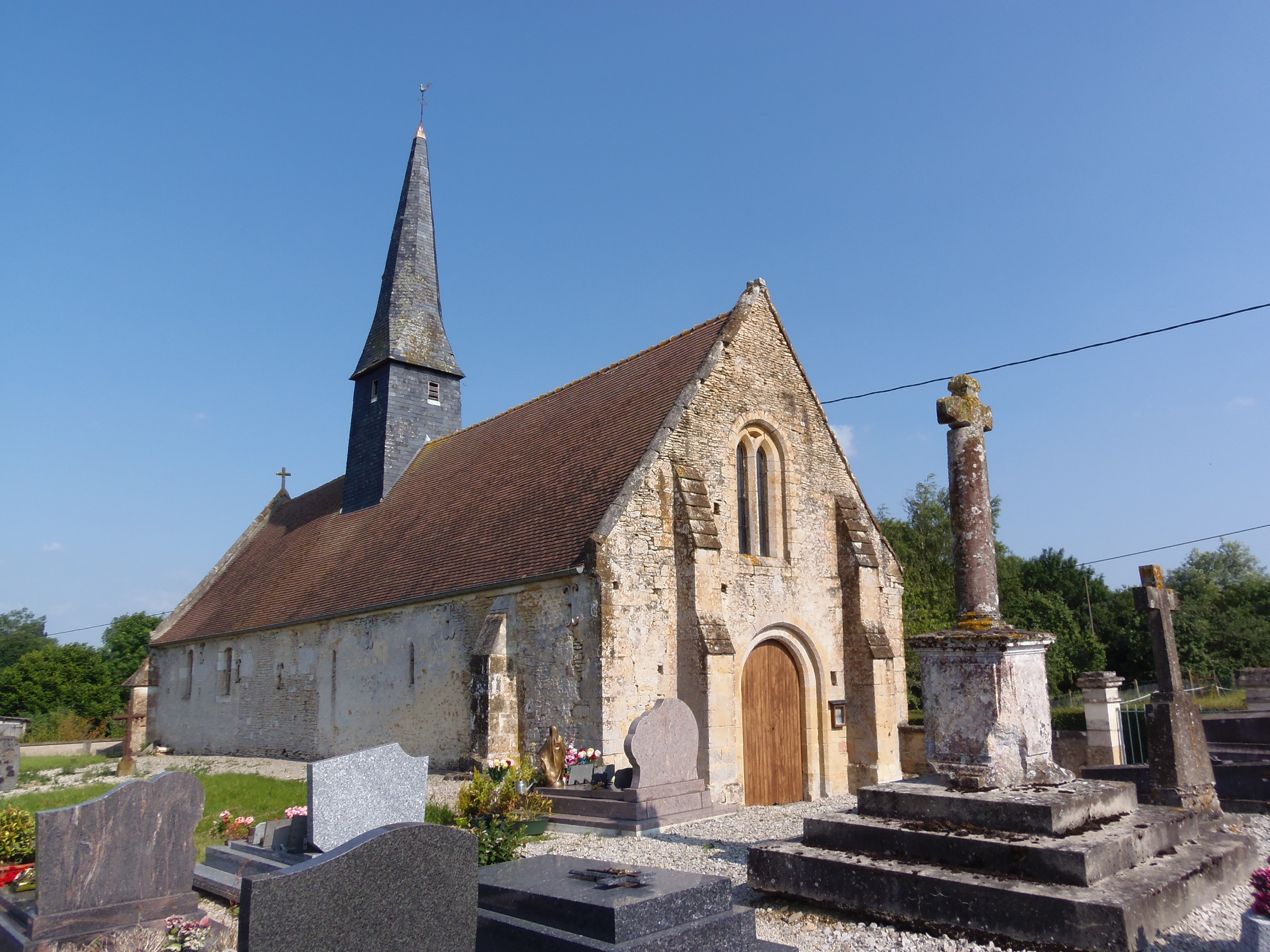
Vaudeloges

Vaudeloges (French pronunciation: [vodlɔʒ]) is a former commune in the Calvados department in the Normandy region in northwestern France. On 1 January 2017, it was merged into the new commune Saint-Pierre-en-Auge.

== See also ==
- Communes of the Calvados department
