= Saint-Remy-Geest =

Village in Wallonia, Belgium

Coordinates: 50°45′N 4°51′E

Saint-Remy-Geest (Dutch: Sint-Remigius-Geest; Walloon: Djé-Sint-Rmey) is a village of Wallonia and a district of the municipality of Jodoigne, located in the province of Walloon Brabant, Belgium.
