= Hiéville =

- Part of Saint-Pierre-en-Auge
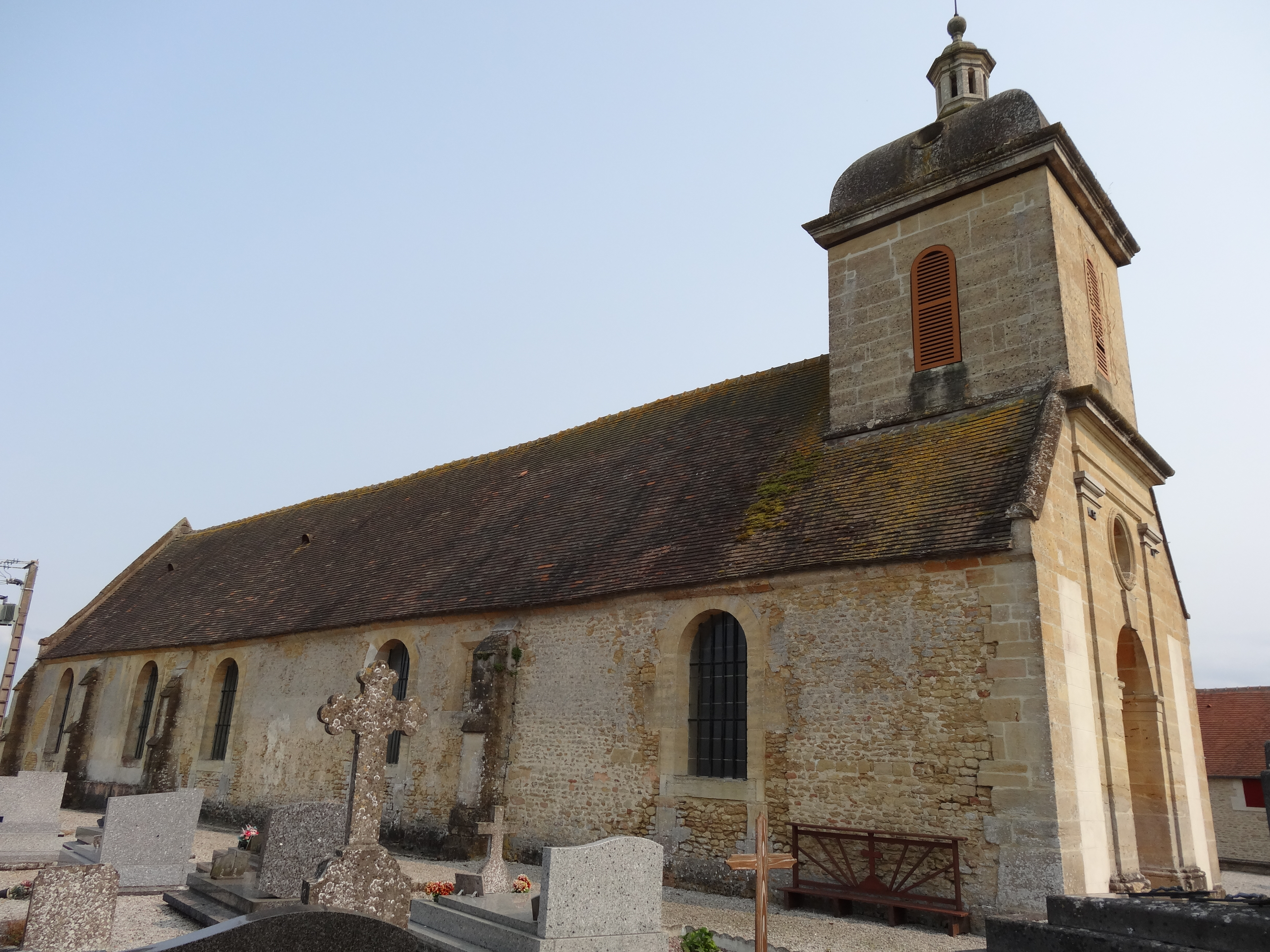
- L'église Saint-Pierre
- Location of Hiéville
- Location within France Location within Normandy
- Coordinates: 49°01′26″N 0°00′25″W
- Country: France
- Region: Normandy
- Department: Calvados
- Arrondissement: Lisieux
- Canton: Livarot-Pays-d'Auge
- Commune: Saint-Pierre-en-Auge
- Area^{1}: 4.77 km^{2} (1.84 sq mi)
- Elevation: 50 m (160 ft)
- Highest elevation: 74 m (243 ft)
- Lowest elevation: 22 m (72 ft)
- Population (2023): 318
  - Density: 66.7/km^{2} (173/sq mi)
- Time zone: UTC+01:00 (CET)
  - Summer (DST): UTC+02:00 (CEST)
- Postal code: 14170
- ^{1} French Land Register data, which excludes lakes, ponds, glaciers > 1 km^{2} (0.386 sq mi or 247 acres) and river estuaries.

Hiéville (French pronunciation: [jevil]) is a former commune in the Calvados department in the Normandy region in northwestern France. On 1 January 2017, it was merged into the new commune Saint-Pierre-en-Auge.

== Etymology ==
French linguist René Lepelley writes that the etymology of Hiéville is similar to that of the commune Hiesville in the Manche department. Both names probably come from the word 'hedo' (a Germanic personal name) and the Old French word 'ville', which originally referred to a rural estate or territory. Ville itself was derived from the Latin phrase 'villa rustica,' a countryside home.

== See also ==
- Communes of the Calvados department
