= Montviette =

- Part of Saint-Pierre-en-Auge
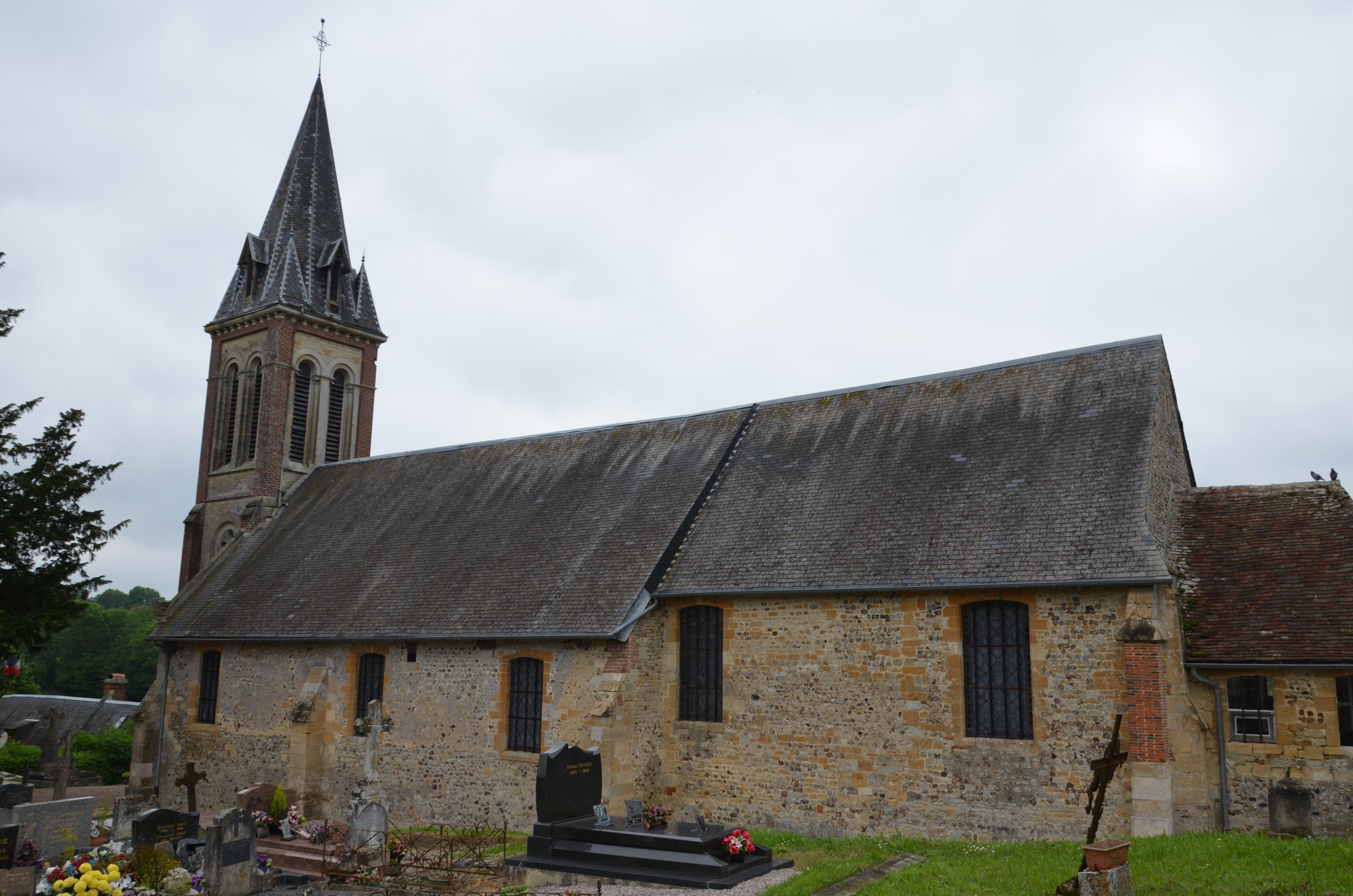
- Location of Montviette
- Location within France Location within Normandy
- Coordinates: 49°00′01″N 0°05′49″E
- Country: France
- Region: Normandy
- Department: Calvados
- Arrondissement: Lisieux
- Canton: Livarot-Pays-d'Auge
- Commune: Saint-Pierre-en-Auge
- Area^{1}: 6.62 km^{2} (2.56 sq mi)
- Elevation: 150 m (490 ft)
- Highest elevation: 195 m (640 ft)
- Lowest elevation: 109 m (358 ft)
- Population (2023): 211
  - Density: 31.9/km^{2} (82.6/sq mi)
- Time zone: UTC+01:00 (CET)
  - Summer (DST): UTC+02:00 (CEST)
- Postal code: 14140
- ^{1} French Land Register data, which excludes lakes, ponds, glaciers > 1 km^{2} (0.386 sq mi or 247 acres) and river estuaries.

Montviette (French pronunciation: [mɔ̃vjɛt]) is a former commune in the Calvados department in the Normandy region in northwestern France. On 1 January 2017, it was merged into the new commune Saint-Pierre-en-Auge.

== See also ==
- Communes of the Calvados department
