= Jauchelette =

- Village
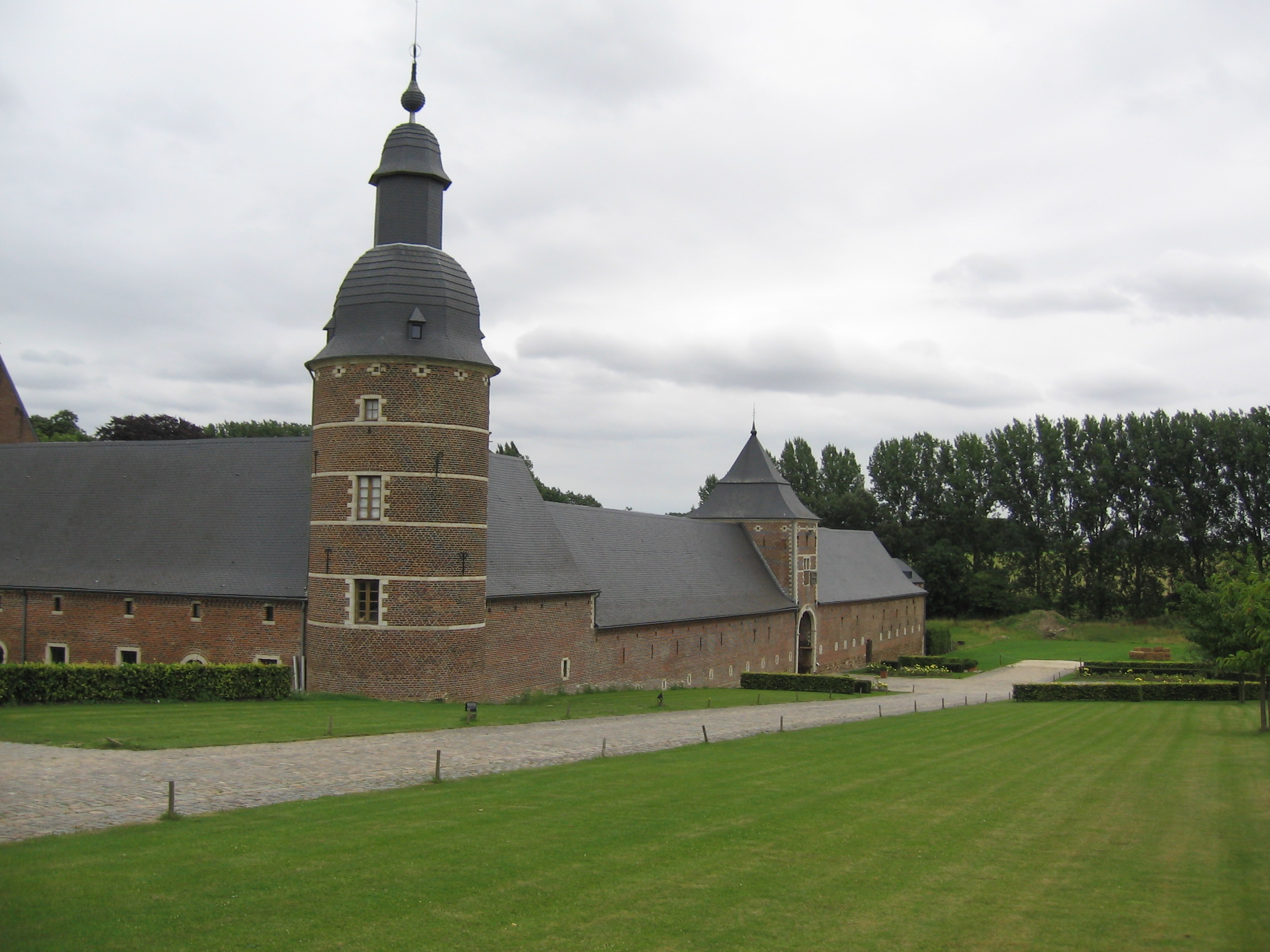
- The abbey of La Ramée

- Location in Jauchelette, Belgium
- Coordinates: 50°41′N 4°51′E
- Country: Belgium
- Municipality: Jodoigne
- Province: Walloon Brabant
- Elevation: 102 m (335 ft)
- Time zone: UTC+2:00 (UTC+02:00)

Jauchelette (French pronunciation: [ʒoʃlɛt]; Walloon: Djåçlete) is a village of Wallonia and a district of the municipality of Jodoigne, located in the province of Walloon-Brabant, Belgium.

The village lies next to the Grand Gette (Djåce in Walloon) and the name means Small Gette (Jauche is the French form for Djåce). The Abbaye de la Ramée was founded here in 1215.
