= Saint-Pierre-en-Auge =

- Commune
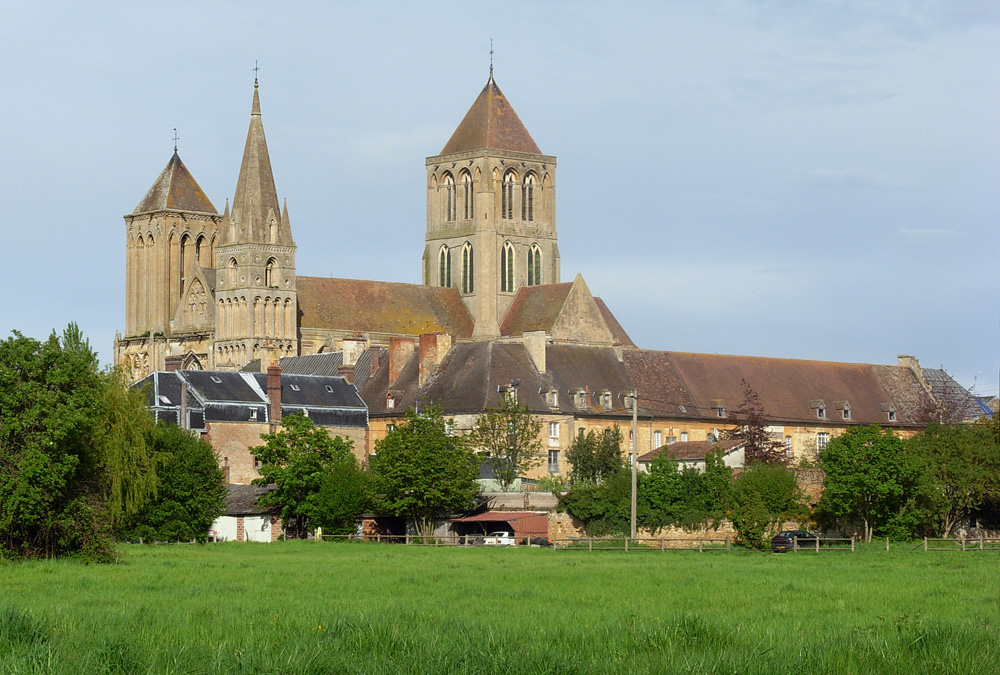
- The abbey in Saint-Pierre-sur-Dives
- Location of Saint-Pierre-en-Auge
- Location within France Location within Normandy
- Coordinates: 49°01′08″N 0°01′59″W
- Country: France
- Region: Normandy
- Department: Calvados
- Arrondissement: Lisieux
- Canton: Livarot-Pays-d'Auge
- Intercommunality: CA Lisieux Normandie

Government
  - Mayor (2020–2026): Jacky Marie
- Area^{1}: 144.97 km^{2} (55.97 sq mi)
- Population (2023): 7,100
  - Density: 49/km^{2} (130/sq mi)
- Time zone: UTC+01:00 (CET)
  - Summer (DST): UTC+02:00 (CEST)
- INSEE/Postal code: 14654 /14170
- ^{1} French Land Register data, which excludes lakes, ponds, glaciers > 1 km^{2} (0.386 sq mi or 247 acres) and river estuaries.

Saint-Pierre-en-Auge (French pronunciation: [sɛ̃ pjɛʁ ɑ̃.n‿oʒ], lit. 'Saint-Pierre in Auge') is a commune in the department of Calvados, northwestern France. The municipality was established on 1 January 2017 by merger of the former communes of Saint-Pierre-sur-Dives (the seat), Boissey, Bretteville-sur-Dives, Hiéville, Mittois, Montviette, L'Oudon, Ouville-la-Bien-Tournée, Sainte-Marguerite-de-Viette, Saint-Georges-en-Auge, Thiéville, Vaudeloges and Vieux-Pont-en-Auge.

== Geography ==
The commune is made up of the following collection of villages and hamlets, Vieux-Pont-en-Auge, Hiéville, Mittois, Sainte-Marguerite-de-Viette, Berville, Carel, Montviette, Saint-Georges-en-Auge, Le Robillard, Saint-Martin-de-Fresnay, L'Oudon, Le Billot, Notre-Dame-de-Fresnay, Meautry, Montpinçon, Vaudeloges, Ammeville, Abbeville, Garnetot, Grandmesnil and Saint-Pierre-en-Auge.

The Dives, La Viette and The Oudon are the three rivers that run through the commune. In addition there are 15 streams that flow through this commune;

1. Ruisseau de la Garenne
2. Ruisseau de la Fontaine du Sue
3. Ruisseau de la Fontaine des Bequilles
4. Ruisseau d'Abbeville
5. Ruisseau du Tilleul
6. Ruisseau de Croquemain
7. Ruisseau de Courville
8. Ruisseau du Val Ingou
9. Ruisseau de la Hanoudiere
10. Ruisseau de Gronde
11. Ruisseau de la Fontaine Saint-Julien
12. Ruisseau de la Fontaine Heurtas
13. Ruisseau de Saint-Georges
14. Ruisseau au Bec

== Population ==
Population data refer to the commune in its geography as of January 2025.

Historical population
Year	Pop.	±% p.a.
1968	7,970	—
1975	8,167	+0.35%
1982	8,267	+0.17%
1990	7,791	−0.74%
1999	7,785	−0.01%
2007	7,819	+0.05%
2012	7,880	+0.16%
2017	7,676	−0.52%
2023	7,100	−1.29%
Source: INSEE

== Points of Interest ==
=== Museums ===
- Museum of Cheesemaking Techniques - is a Museum of France that opened in 1986 based in the Abbey of Saint-Pierre.

=== National heritage sites ===
The commune has eighteen sites listed as a Monument historique.

- Abbaye de Saint-Pierre-sur-Dives - a former abbey established in the eleventh century, with buildings dating from the thirteenth century listed as a monument in 1904. It is open to the public.
- Château de Carel - a sixteenth century Château listed as a monument in 1950. It is open to the public.
- Église Saint-Gervais et Saint-Protais de Mittois - a thirteenth century church listed as a monument in 1926.
- Église Notre-Dame d'Ouville-la-Bien-Tournée - a thirteenth century church listed as a monument in 1896.
- Église Saint-Martin de Thiéville' - a thirteenth century church listed as a monument in 1913.
- Église Saint-Aubin de Vieux-Pont-en-Auge' - a twelfth century church listed as a monument in 1862.
- Église Saint-Paterne de Lieury - a fourteenth century church listed as a monument in 1928.
- Halles à Saint-Pierre-en-Auge - a fifteenth century market hall, that still used to house the weekly market, listed as a monument in 1889.
- Manoir d'Houlbec, à Ecots - a fifteenth century Manor house listed as a monument in 1993.
- Manoir de Boissey - a seventeenth century Manor house listed as a monument in 2021.
- Manoir de Saint-Martin-de-Fresnay - a sixteenth century Manor house listed as a monument in 1975.
- Manoir de la Roque, à Montpinçon - a sixteenth century Manor house listed as a monument in 1993.
- Manoir dit Cour d'Elu - a sixteenth century Manor house listed as a monument in 1927.
- Manoir dit Manoir de Thomas Dunot - a seventeenth century Manor house listed as a monument in 1973.
- Manoir dit la Commanderie - a fourteenth century Manor house, known as the Commanderie, listed as a monument in 1927.
- Manoir du Lieu-Rocher - a seventeenth century Manor house listed as a monument in 2004.

There are a further two house in the town of Saint-Pierre-en-Auge listed as monuments.

== Transport ==
The commune has a railway station at Saint-Pierre-sur-Dives on the Le Mans to Mézidon line.

== Notable people ==
- Ferdinand Barbedienne (1810 - 1892) - a metalworker and manufacturer, well known as a bronze founder, who was born here in Saint-Martin-de-Fresnay.
- Jacques-Pierre Amette (born 1943) - a writer, was born here in Saint-Pierre-sur-Dives.

== Twin towns – sister cities ==
Saint-Pierre-en-Auge is twinned with:

- (England) - Ivybridge since 1972.
- (Germany) - Kleinwallstadt since 1991.
- (Belgium) - Jodoigne since 1978.

== See also ==
- Communes of the Calvados department
