= Sainte-Marie-Geest =

Coordinates: 50°44′41″N 4°52′28″E

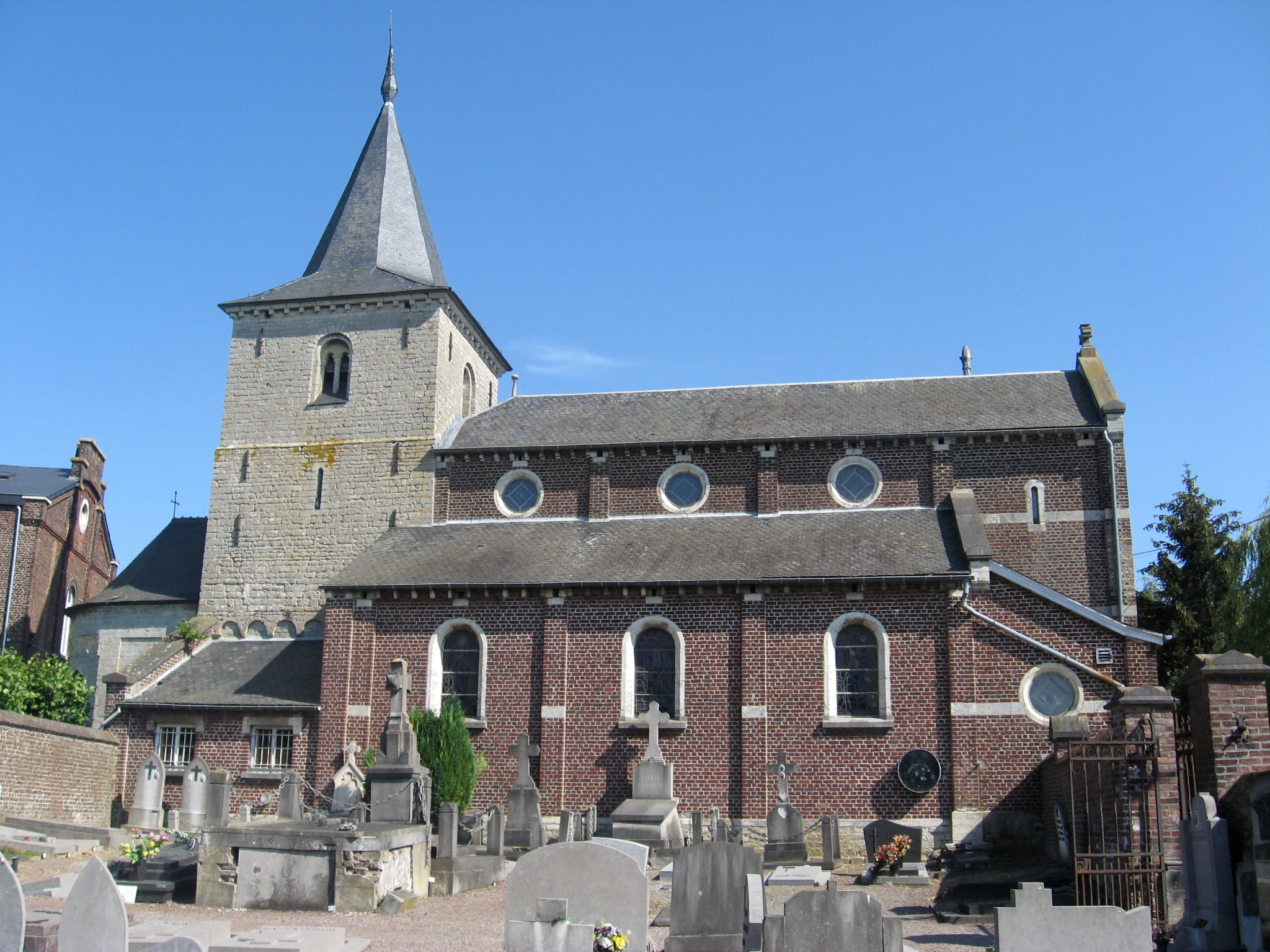
Church of Saint Pierre

Sainte-Marie-Geest (Walloon: Djé-Sinte-Mareye) is a village of Wallonia in the municipality of Jodoigne, district of Saint-Jean-Geest, located in the province of Walloon Brabant, Belgium.
