= Boissey, Calvados =

Boissey
- Part of Saint-Pierre-en-Auge
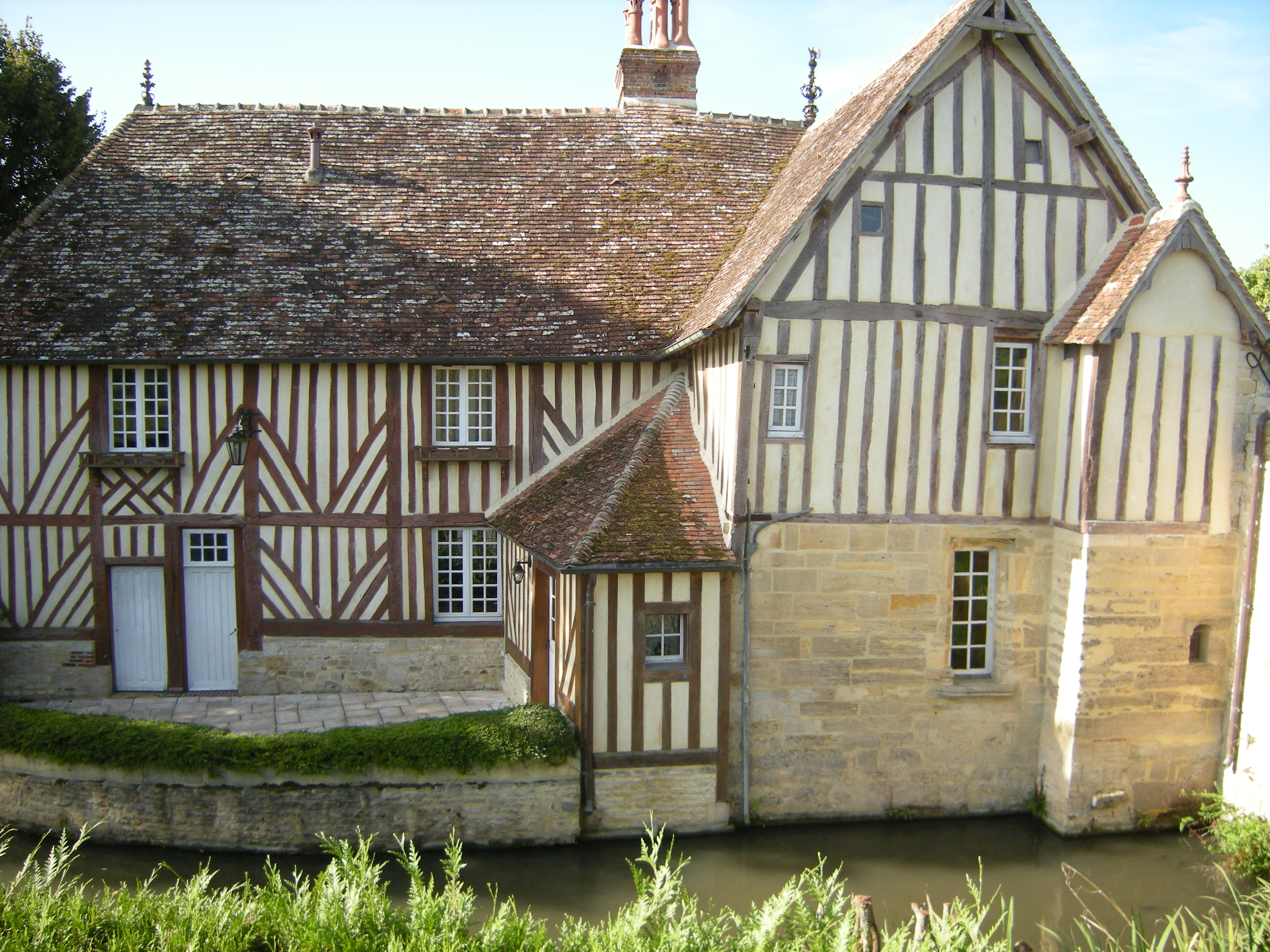
- Manoir of Boissey
- Location of Boissey
- Location within France Location within Normandy
- Coordinates: 49°01′12″N 0°02′52″E
- Country: France
- Region: Normandy
- Department: Calvados
- Arrondissement: Lisieux
- Canton: Livarot-Pays-d'Auge
- Commune: Saint-Pierre-en-Auge
- Area^{1}: 5.28 km^{2} (2.04 sq mi)
- Elevation: 70 m (230 ft)
- Highest elevation: 165 m (541 ft)
- Lowest elevation: 34 m (112 ft)
- Population (2023): 205
  - Density: 38.8/km^{2} (101/sq mi)
- Time zone: UTC+01:00 (CET)
  - Summer (DST): UTC+02:00 (CEST)
- Postal code: 14170
- ^{1} French Land Register data, which excludes lakes, ponds, glaciers > 1 km^{2} (0.386 sq mi or 247 acres) and river estuaries.

Boissey (French pronunciation: [bwasɛ]) is a former commune in the Calvados department in the Normandy region in northwestern France. On 1 January 2017, it was merged into the new commune Saint-Pierre-en-Auge.

== See also ==
- Communes of the Calvados department
