= Beerenburg =

Dutch spirit drink

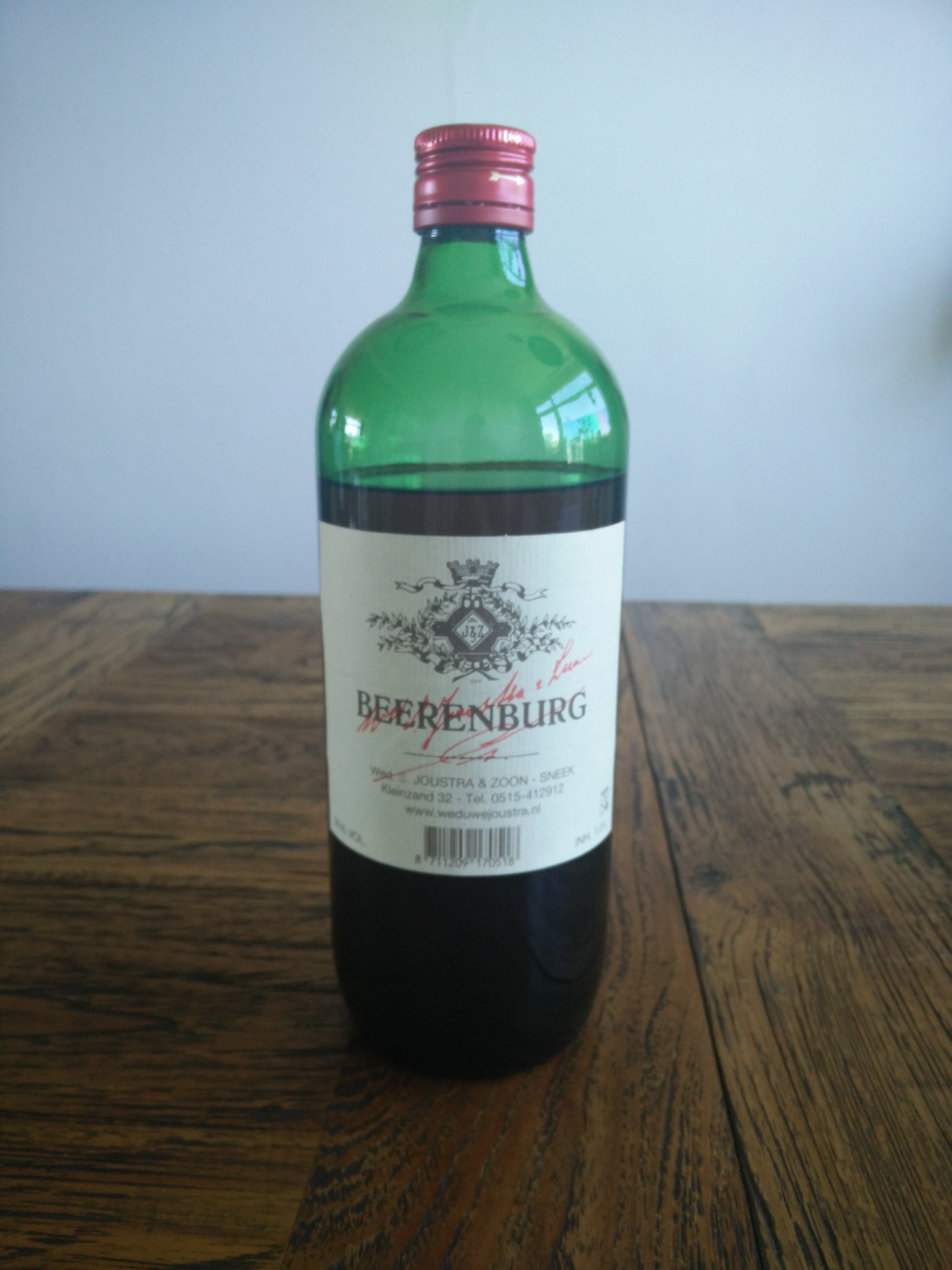
Weduwe Joustra Beerenburg

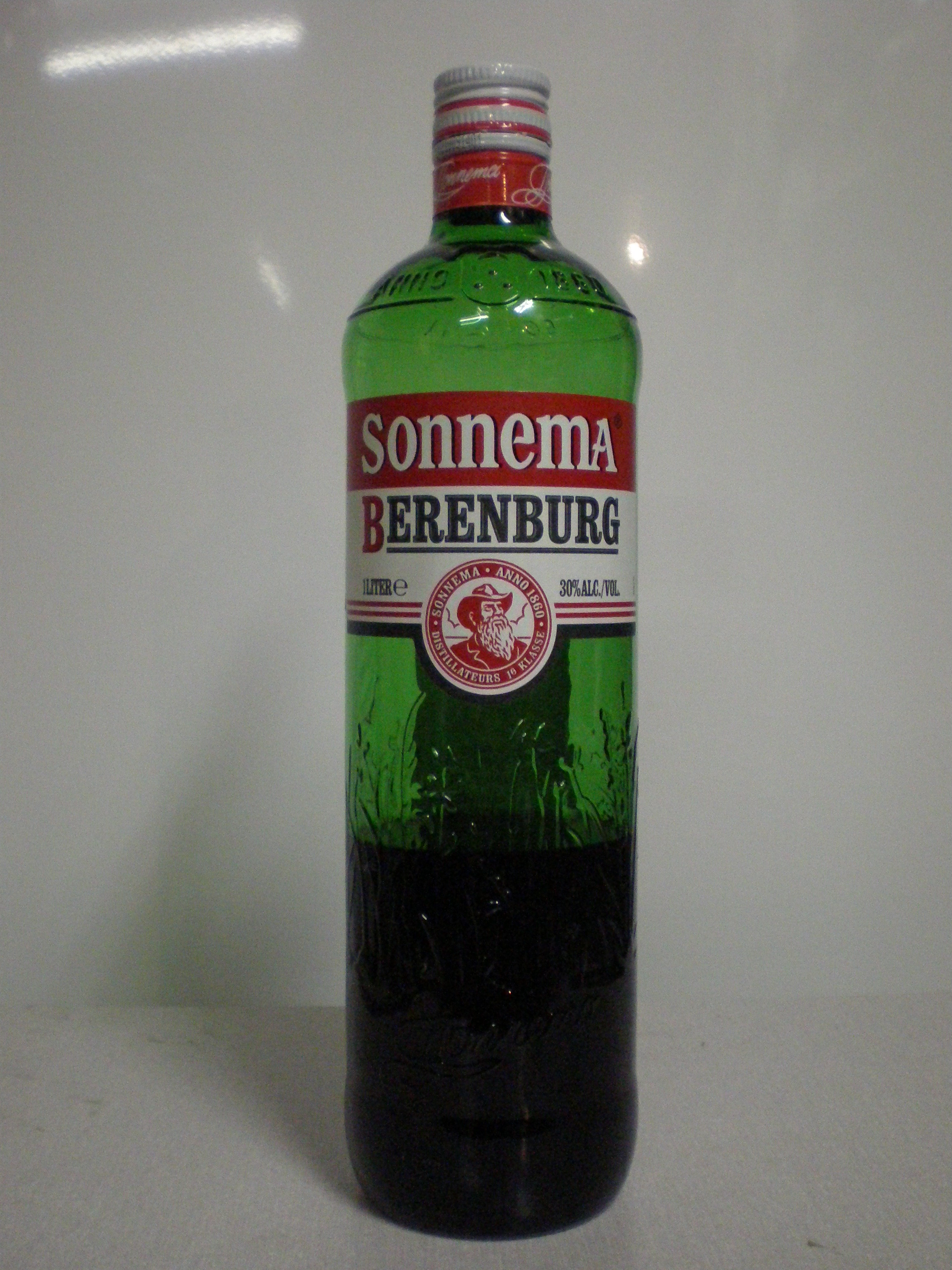
Bottle of Sonnema Berenburg

Beerenburg (West Frisian: Bearenburch) is a Dutch drink, made by adding herbs to jenever, with about 30% alcohol.

The original Beerenburg was made in the early 18th century by the Amsterdam spice merchant Hendrik Beerenburg, to whom it owes its name. Beerenburg opened his own shop at the Stromarkt 6 in Amsterdam in 1724, a location which to date shows on its roof a bear ('beer') crawling out of a fortress ('burcht'). Beerenburg kept his recipe secret but soon local varieties emerged, each with its own recipe. These were, however, not allowed to use the name "Beerenburg", which is why there are variations on the spelling, such as Berenburg and Berenburger.

Despite the Amsterdam (North Holland) origin of Beerenburg, the drink became most popular in the northern provinces Friesland, Groningen and Drenthe. It is related to the Italian amaro, another type of digestive bitters.

In the European Union, Beerenburg is classified as a spirit drink.

== Brands ==
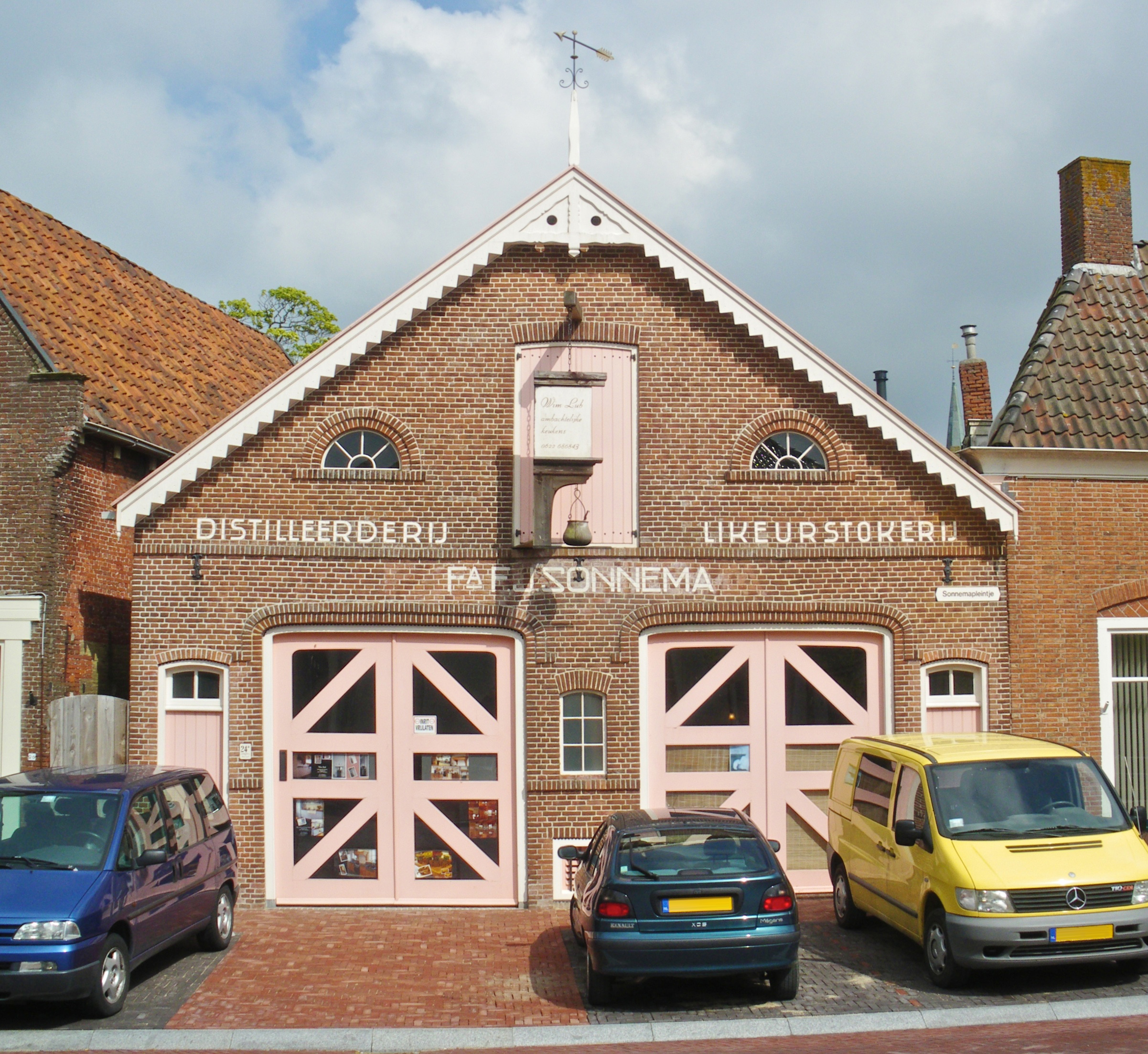
Old building of the Berenburg distillery F.J. Sonnema in Dokkum.

Some famous brands of Beerenburg are: Boomsma (Leeuwarden), Bokma, Sonnema (Dokkum), Weduwe Joustra (Sneek), Plantinga (Bolsward), all from Friesland, and Hooghoudt Kalmoes, from Groningen.
