= Piétrain, Belgium =

Village in Walloon Brabant, Belgium

Coordinates: 50°44′N 4°55′E

Piétrain (French pronunciation: [pjetʁɛ̃]; Dutch: Petrem; Walloon: Pîtrin) is a village of Wallonia and a district of the municipality of Jodoigne, located in the province of Walloon Brabant, Belgium. The village Herbais lies south of the sub-municipality.
