= Saint-Georges-en-Auge =

- Part of Saint-Pierre-en-Auge
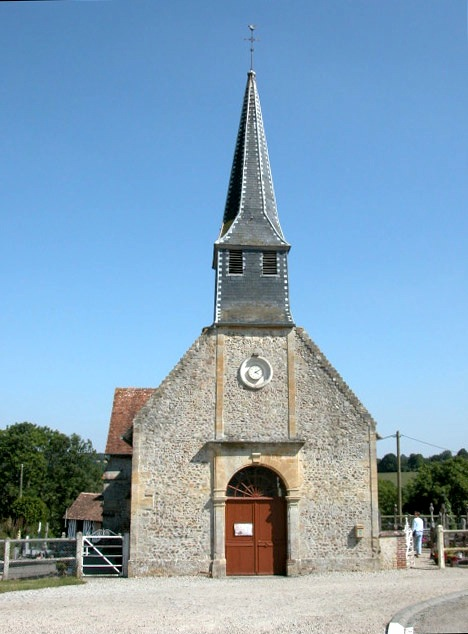
- Location of Saint-Georges-en-Auge
- Location within France Location within Normandy
- Coordinates: 48°59′29″N 0°03′40″E
- Country: France
- Region: Normandy
- Department: Calvados
- Arrondissement: Lisieux
- Canton: Livarot-Pays-d'Auge
- Commune: Saint-Pierre-en-Auge
- Area^{1}: 5.16 km^{2} (1.99 sq mi)
- Elevation: 150 m (490 ft)
- Highest elevation: 197 m (646 ft)
- Lowest elevation: 98 m (322 ft)
- Population (2023): 71
  - Density: 14/km^{2} (36/sq mi)
- Time zone: UTC+01:00 (CET)
  - Summer (DST): UTC+02:00 (CEST)
- Postal code: 14140
- ^{1} French Land Register data, which excludes lakes, ponds, glaciers > 1 km^{2} (0.386 sq mi or 247 acres) and river estuaries.

Saint-Georges-en-Auge (French pronunciation: [sɛ̃ ʒɔʁʒ ɑ̃.n‿oʒ], literally Saint-Georges in Auge) is a former commune in the Calvados department in the Normandy region in northwestern France. On 1 January 2017, it was merged into the new commune Saint-Pierre-en-Auge.

== See also ==
- Communes of the Calvados department
