= Lathuy =

- Village
- Location in Lathuy, Belgium
- Coordinates: 50°43′N 4°50′E
- Country: Belgium
- Municipality: Jodoigne
- Province: Walloon Brabant
- Elevation: 102 m (335 ft)
- Time zone: UTC+2:00 (UTC+02:00)

Lathuy (French pronunciation: [latɥi]; Dutch: Laatwijk; Walloon: Låtu) is a village of Wallonia and a district of the municipality of Jodoigne, located in the province of Walloon Brabant, Belgium.
