= Boomsma =

Boomsma is a Dutch surname. Notable people with the surname include:

- Arie Boomsma (born 1974), Dutch television presenter
- Clifford David Boomsma (1915–2004), Australian botanist
- Diederik Boomsma (born 1978), Dutch politician
- Dorret Boomsma (born 1957), Dutch biological psychologist
- Jacobus Boomsma (born 1951), Danish-Dutch evolutionary biologist
- Rein Boomsma (1879–1943), Dutch footballer
