= Jodoigne-Souveraine =

Coordinates: 50°43′N 4°51′E

Jodoigne-Souveraine (French pronunciation: [ʒɔdɔɲ suvʁɛn]; Walloon: Djodogne Sovrinne) is a village of Wallonia and a district of the municipality of Jodoigne, located in the province of Walloon Brabant, Belgium.

The village lies next to the Great Gette.

== Patrimony ==
- The Saint Peter Church built in 1769-1771 with a tower from 1681.
- The Castle of Jodoigne-Souveraine is on the list of Exceptional heritage of Wallonia.
- Moulin Conard: the watermill of 1848 is a classified monument.
- The old cure: a walled presbytery from 1733.
- Café Jacquet: the pub is for about 200 years in a building from the 18th century; the party room was a blacksmith's shop in the 1828.

== Gallery ==
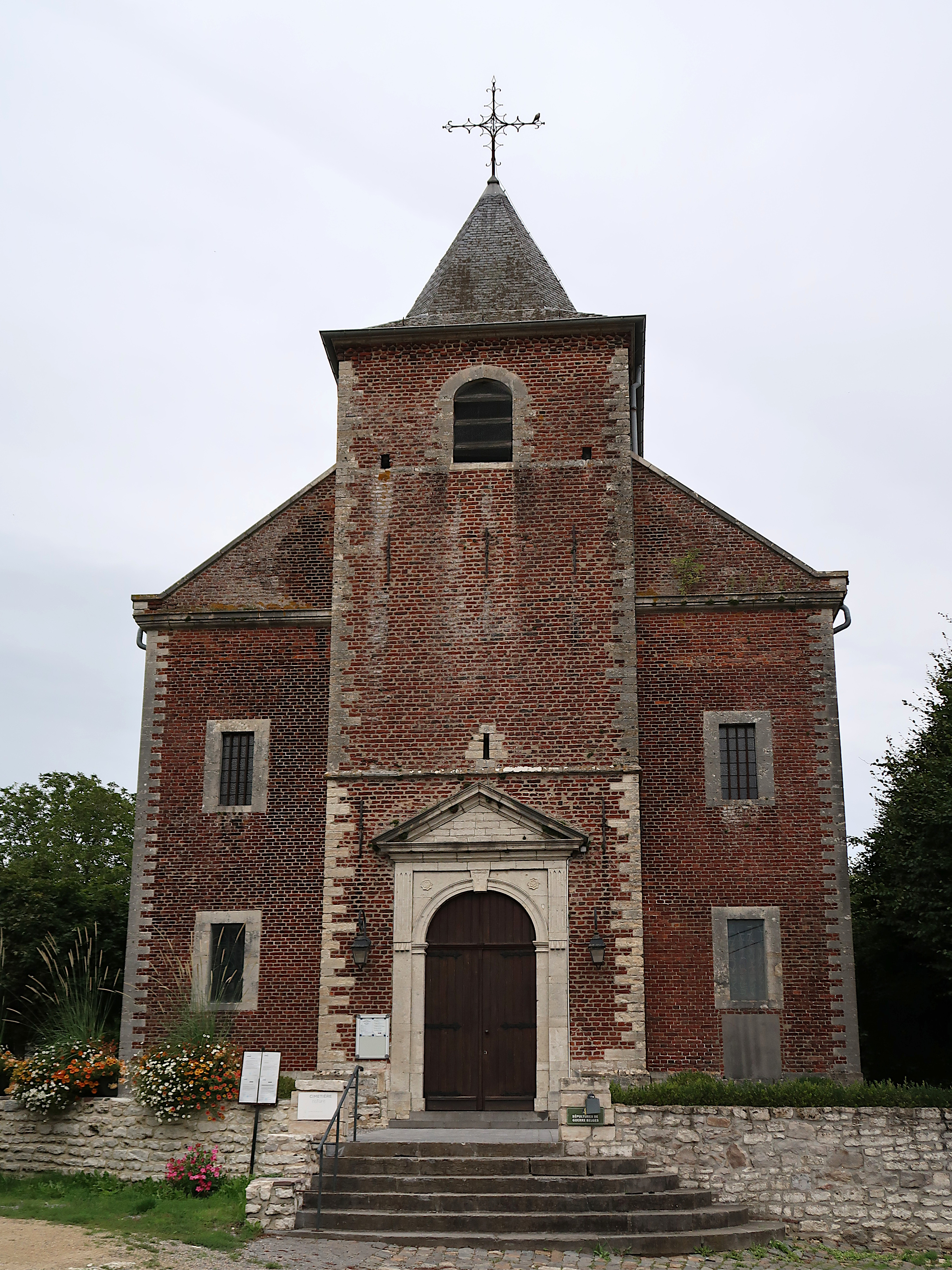
Saint Peter Church

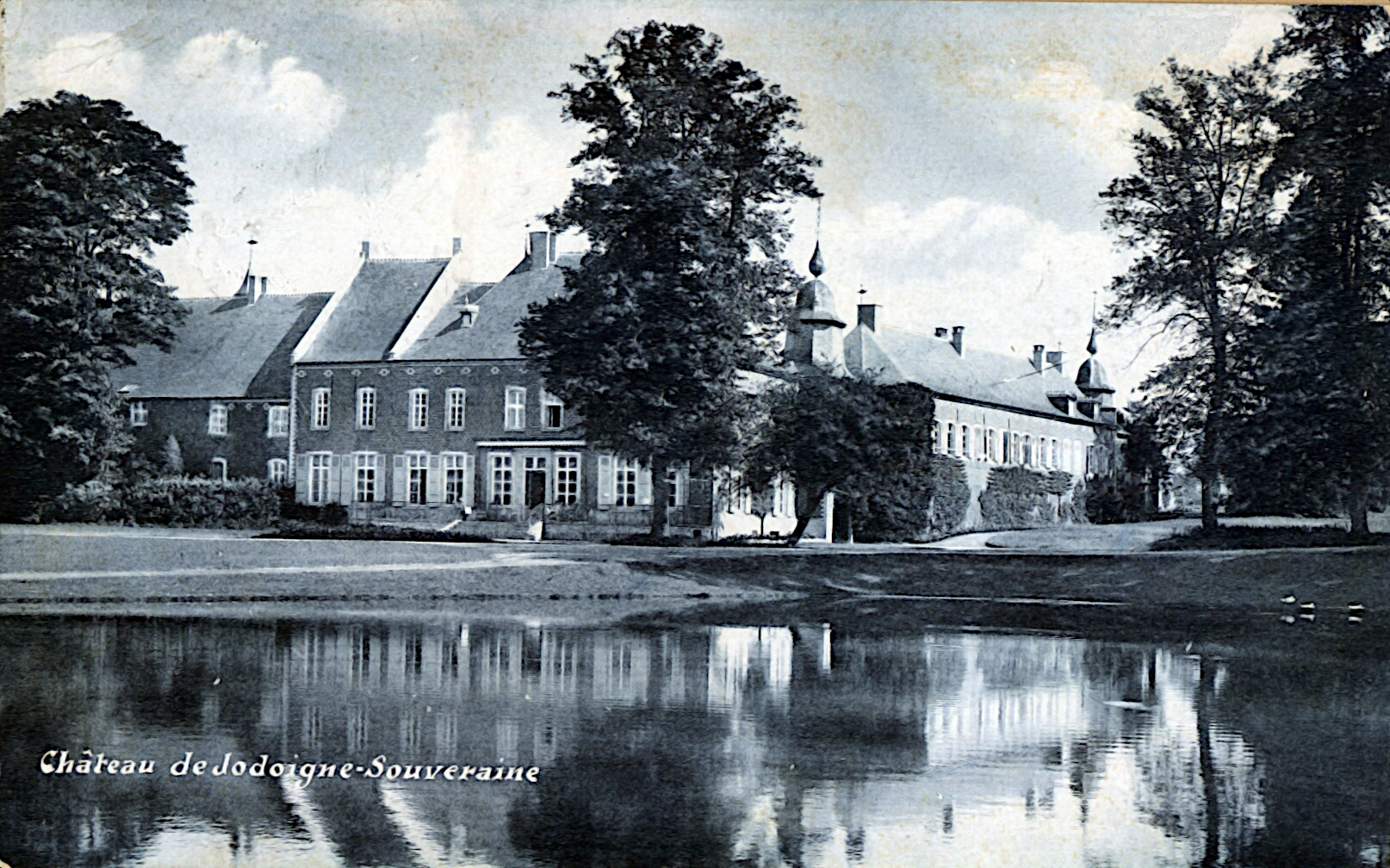
The Castle of Jodoigne-Souveraine

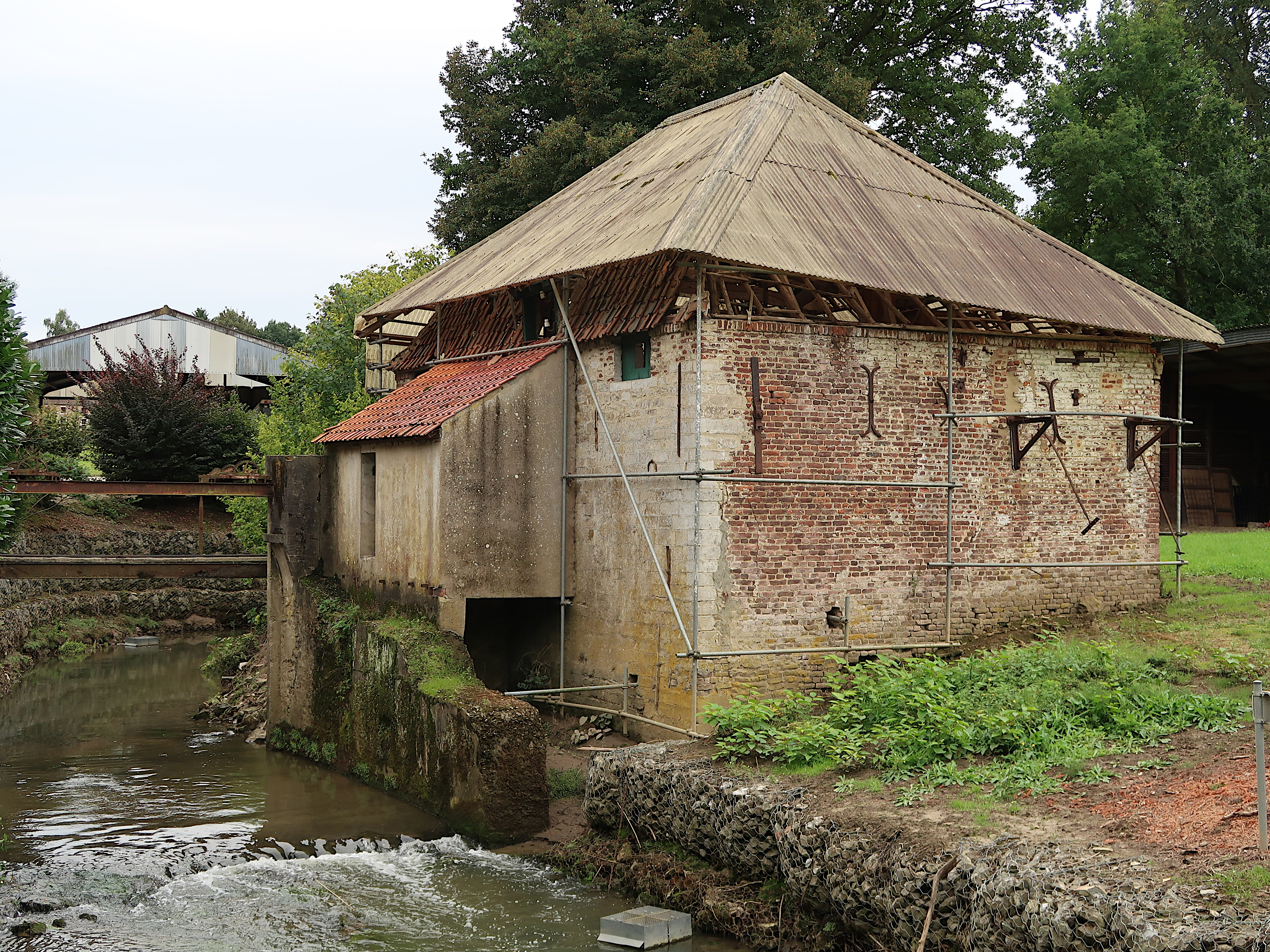
Mill Conard (with a provisional plastic protection since 1993)

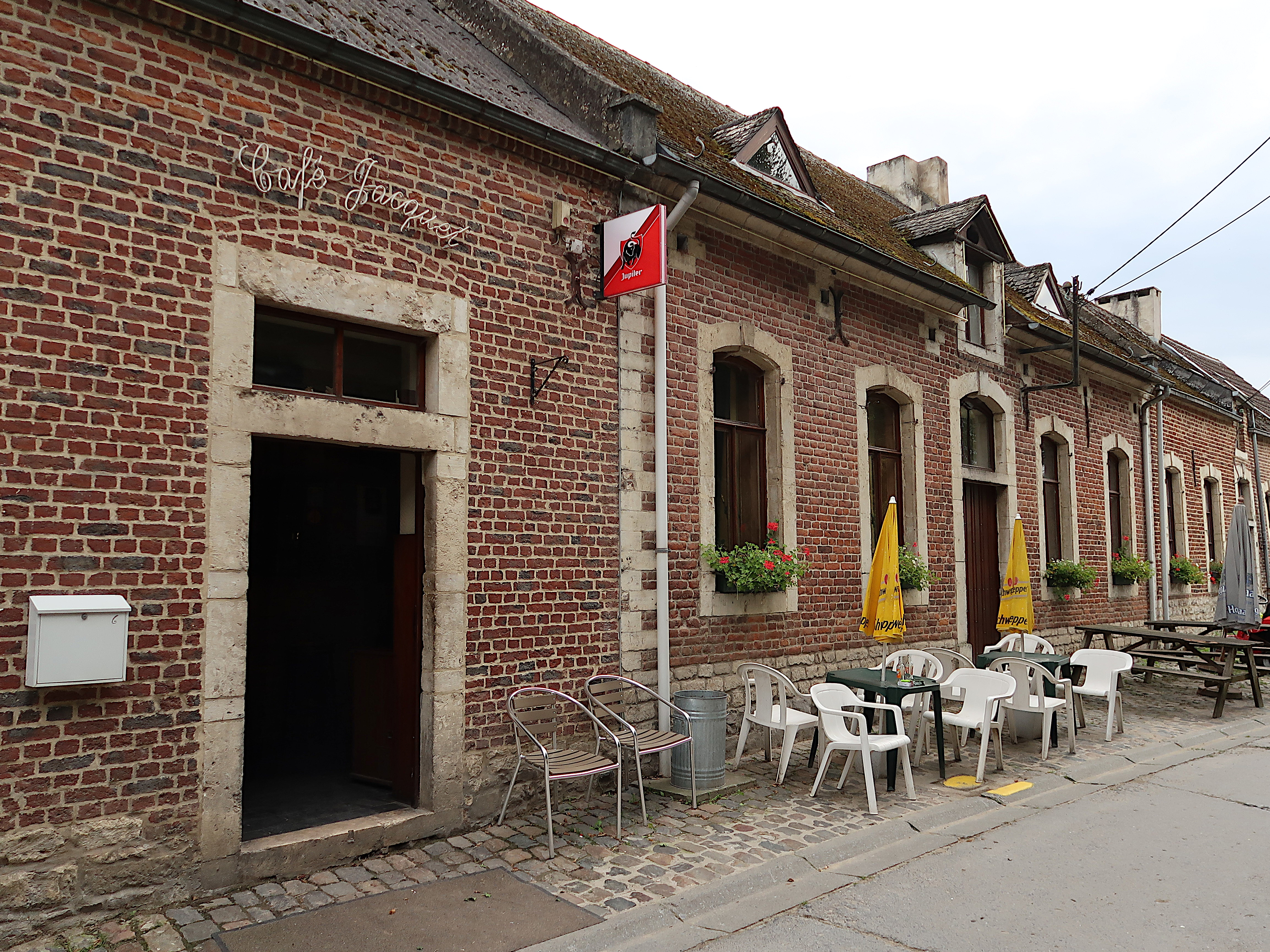
Café Jacquet pub
