= Hooghoudt (distillery) =

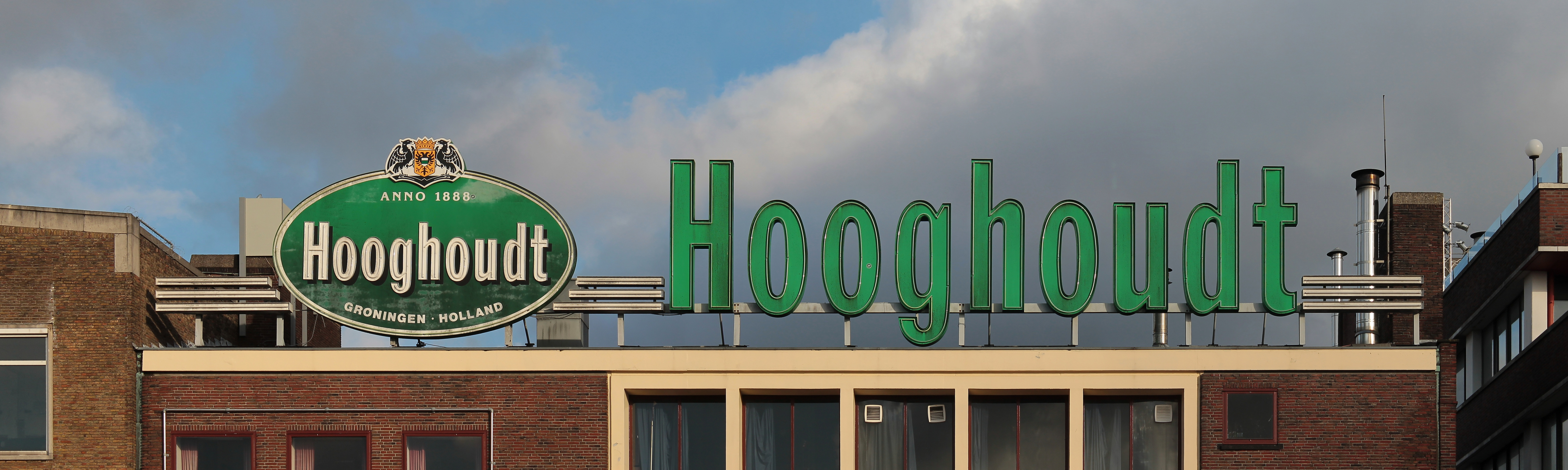
Advertisement for Hooghoudt

Hooghoudt is a Groninger producer of several alcoholic beverages. The company was founded in 1888. Hooghoudt's products include jenever (Dutch gin), vodka and beerenburg.

== History ==
The family company was founded in 1888 by Hero Jan Hooghoudt, who had been a baker. The distillery was based in the city centre of Groningen, but has since moved to a new complex in an office park in Euvelgunne. The distillery employs between 50 and 100 people and has an estimated revenue of 10 to 25 million euros. The distillery has a relationship with the Herberg Hooghoudt tasting room and café on Reguliersgracht ("regulator's canal") in Amsterdam.

Hooghoudt was acquired in May 2025 by La Martiniquaise who announced in July that the distillery would close by the end of 2025 and production would be transferred to a facility in Ghent, Belgium.
