= Vieille (disambiguation) =

Paul Vieille (1854–1934) was a French chemist and inventor.

Vieille may also refer to:

== People ==
- Catherine Hermary-Vieille (born 1943), French writer
- Pierre de Vieille-Brioude (c. 1200–1242), French nobleman

== Places ==
- La Vieille, a lighthouse in France
- La Vieille Airfield, abandoned WWII military airfield
- La Vieille Rivière, a river in Canada

== See also ==
- Vieilles (disambiguation)
- Vieux (disambiguation)
- Vielle (disambiguation)
- Veille (disambiguation)
