= Vielle (disambiguation) =

The vielle is a medieval European stringed instrument.

Vielle may also refer to:

== People ==
- Ernoul le Vielle de Gastinois, 13th-century French composer
- Eugene Vielle (1913–2015), British Royal Air Force officer

== Places ==
- Vielle-Aure, a commune in France
- Vielle-Adour, a commune in France
- Vielle-Tursan, a commune in France
- Vielle-Louron, a commune in France
- Vielle-Soubiran, a commune in France
- Vielle-Saint-Girons, a commune in France
- Vieille-Église, a commune in France
- Canal de la Vieille-Autise, a.k.a. Vieille-Autise Canal, a commune in France

== See also ==
- Vieux (disambiguation)
- Vieille (disambiguation)
- Veille (disambiguation)
