= Veille (disambiguation) =

Amélie Veille (born 1981) is a Canadian singer and songwriter.

Veille may also refer to:

- La Veille, a historic home in the United States

== See also ==
- Vieille (disambiguation)
- Vielle (disambiguation)
