= Dutch brandy =

Liquor

Dutch brandy (vieux)
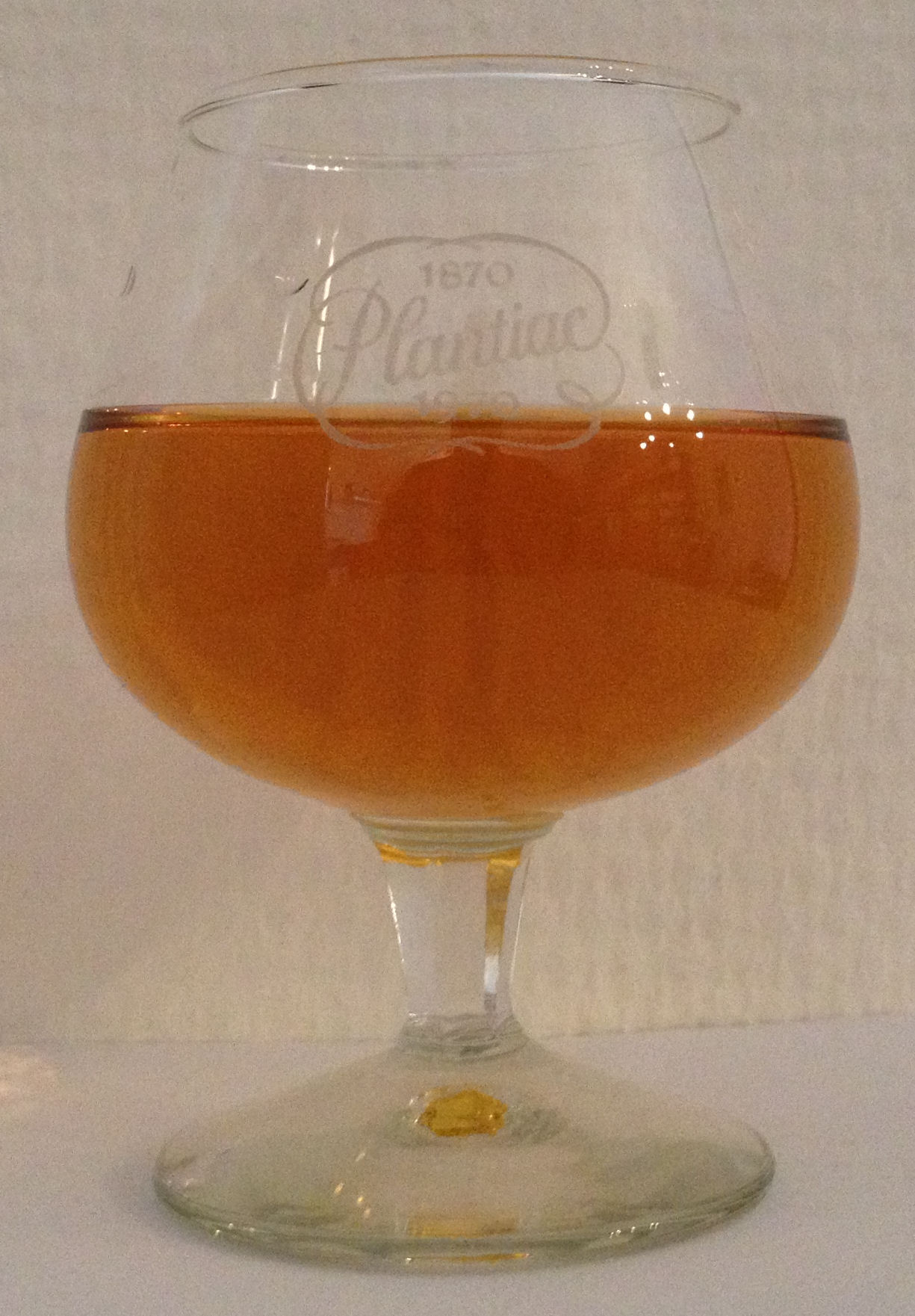
- Type: Dutch Distilled
- Manufacturer: Various, including Bols, Boomsma, Hooghoudt, Wenneker
- Origin: Netherlands
- Introduced: Early 20th century
- Alcohol by volume: 35%
- Colour: White to dark brown
- Flavour: Sweet, smooth, warm
- Related products: Cognac

Dutch brandy (Dutch: vieux, pronounced [vjøː]) is a distilled spirit made from either grain or molasses alcohol flavored with various essences and extracts produced in the Netherlands. It was formerly referred to as "Dutch cognac" until that name was legally restricted to grape brandy from the Cognac region of France. Dutch names included Koetsiertje or Koetsierscognac (cognac drunk by koetsiers, i.e. carriage riders) or Hollandse Cognac (Dutch Cognac). Its colour ranges from clear to dark brown, reflecting added caramel or artificial dye.

== Production ==
Dutch brandy is based on either grain or molasses alcohol, with added essences and extracts to produce a particular taste. These may include fusel oil, amyl alcohols, vanilla, esters, oak curls, prune extract and the concentrated liquids obtained from liquorice root (Glycyrrhiza glabra, Dutch "zoethoutwortel").

Any Dutch brandy is supposed to contain at least 35% of alcohol, and not more than 20 grammes of sugar per litre. Usually, a little real cognac, eau-de-vie or other grape-based distilled product is added. The brown colour of vieux can be obtained using caramel or an artificial colouring.

== History ==
Although the Treaty of Versailles (1919) already forbade the name "Cognac" from being applied to products produced outside of the French Cognac region, Dutch brandy continued to be sold using it until the 1960s. The packaging (often including stars) was clearly derived from cognac packaging. Pressure from the French government led to a specific Dutch law banning its use, ratified by the Dutch Supreme Court in a trade treaty with France on 1 June 1956.

Dutch brandy producers decided upon the name "vieux", French for "old", which had already been used before and which did not provide any pronunciation difficulties. The term is and was often used to describe old Dutch brandy ("Cognac Vieux").

Although its manufacturers feared a decline in sales due to the name change, the opposite occurred. Older people prefer it in traditional ways, by itself or with coffee, younger mixed with cola.

Initially Dutch brandy had a cheap public image, in spite of attempting to borrow Cognac's prestige. Most manufacturers sought to distance themselves from even their own product. Lucas Bols, for example, used the name "Parade Vieux" (with the Dutch advertisement slogan "Pa pakt Parade" – "Dad picks Parade"), and disclaimed production by crediting its production to "Distillery Westertoren" rather than the official name of their facility. After Dutch brandy's reputation improved, the Parade name was changed to "Bols Vieux".

== Statistics ==
In 2009, Dutch brandy was the fifth most popular distilled beverage in the Netherlands by consumption percentage (after Jonge Jenever, whisky, liqueur and rum). Its 5.9% market share was on a par with Beerenburg.

== Companies and brands ==
Dutch brandy is made by a variety of distilleries, though several of them are owned (at least in name) by the Herman Jansen group (previously UTO). Vieux brands include Het Anker, Bestevaer, Bootz (made by Bols), Boots, Dujardin (made by Wenneker, who sell their regular 35% "Dujardin Blue label" as well as the more exclusive 38% "Vieux Superieur Gold Label"), Floryn, Henkes (made by Bols), Hooghoudt, Hoppe (made by Bols), Hulsink, De Kuyper, Legner Fine Vieille (not officially named "Vieux" as it only contains 30% of alcohol), Olifant and Plantiac (made by Boomsma).
