= Jodoigne =

City in Walloon Brabant province, Wallonia, Belgium

Jodoigne Djodogne (Walloon)
- Municipality
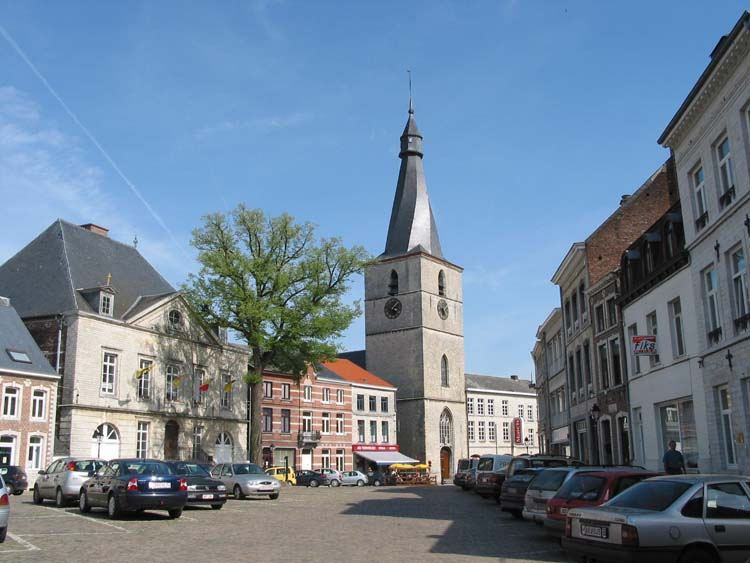

- Flag Coat of arms

- The municipality of Jodoigne in Walloon Brabant
- Interactive map of Jodoigne
- Location in Belgium
- Coordinates: 50°43′N 04°52′E
- Country: Belgium
- Community: French Community
- Region: Wallonia
- Province: Walloon Brabant
- Arrondissement: Nivelles

Government
  - Mayor: Jean-Luc Meurice (MR)
  - Governing party: Union Communale

Area
  - Total: 73.73 km^{2} (28.47 sq mi)

Population (2018-01-01)
  - Total: 14,079
  - Density: 191.0/km^{2} (494.6/sq mi)
- Postal codes: 1370
- NIS code: 25048
- Area codes: 010
- Website: www.jodoigne.be

Jodoigne (French: [ʒɔdɔɲ]; Walloon: Djodogne [dʒɔdɔɲ]; Dutch: Geldenaken [ˈɣɛldəˌnaːkə(n)]) is a municipality and city of Wallonia located in the province of Walloon Brabant, Belgium.

On January 1, 2006, Jodoigne had a total population of 12,440. The total area is 73.31 km^{2} (28.31 sq mi) which gives a population density of 170 inhabitants per square kilometre (440/sq mi).

The municipality consists of the following districts: Dongelberg, Jauchelette, Jodoigne, Jodoigne-Souveraine, Lathuy, Piétrain, Saint-Jean-Geest (including the hamlet of Sainte-Marie-Geest), Saint-Remy-Geest, and Zétrud-Lumay.

In the 1568 Battle of Jodoigne, one of the early battles of the Eighty Years' War, the Spanish Duke of Alba defeated a Dutch rebel force under William the Silent.

The previous mayor of Jodoigne, Louis Michel, a liberal politician was the Belgian foreign minister from 1999 until 2004 and was the Belgian European commissioner from 2004 until 2009. The current mayor is Jean-Paul Wahl.

The asteroid 1199 Geldonia was named in its honour (from the Latin form of the name) by Eugène Delporte.

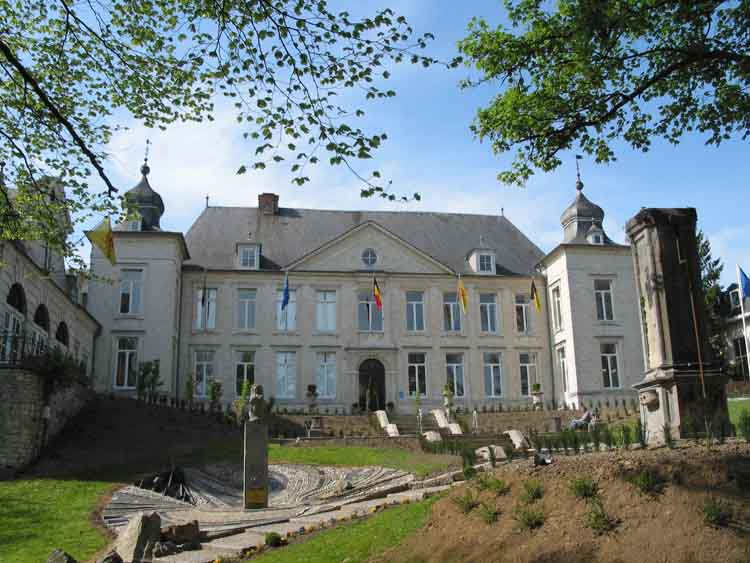
Château Pastur, a former residence of Henry I of Brabant, now the hôtel de ville of Jodoigne

== Twin towns – sister cities ==
Jodoigne is twinned with:

- (France) - Saint-Pierre-en-Auge since 1978.
