= 1997–98 Inter Milan season =

Football team season

Inter Milan
1997–98 season
- Owner: Massimo Moratti
- President: Massimo Moratti
- Manager: Luigi Simoni
- Serie A: 2nd (in 1998-99 UEFA Champions League)
- Coppa Italia: Quarter-finals
- UEFA Cup: Winners
- Top goalscorer: League: Ronaldo (25); All: Ronaldo (34)
- Highest home attendance: 80,095 vs. Milan (22 November 1997)
- Lowest home attendance: 16,085 vs. Lyon (21 October 1997)
- Average home league attendance: 67,825
Home colours	Away colours	Third colours
- All statistics correct as of 16 May 1998.

In the 1997–98 season, the Italian football club Inter Milan, managed by Luigi Simoni, won the UEFA Cup and achieved second place in the Serie A league.

== Season overview ==
Massimo Moratti relied on Luigi Simoni as coach and on Ronaldo as star. Further purchases resulted in Diego Simeone, Francesco Moriero and Álvaro Recoba who – in his debut – scored twice, helping Inter beat Brescia in a 2–1 comeback. Compared to the previous seasons, it proved to be better for Inter who mounted their first serious shot at the title since 1989.

However, with a loss at Juventus, the reigning champions won 1–0, holding three points over Inter. Ten days later, Inter won – for the third time in the last seven years – the UEFA Cup beating Lazio 3–0. The domestic league ended with Inter in second place, last achieved in 1993.

== Players ==
Note: Flags indicate national team as defined under FIFA eligibility rules; some limited exceptions apply. Players may hold more than one non-FIFA nationality.

No.	Pos.	Nation	Player
1	GK	ITA	Gianluca Pagliuca
2	DF	ITA	Giuseppe Bergomi
3	DF	ITA	Massimo Tarantino
4	DF	ARG	Javier Zanetti
5	DF	ITA	Fabio Galante
6	MF	FRA	Youri Djorkaeff
7	DF	ITA	Salvatore Fresi
8	MF	NED	Aron Winter
9	FW	CHI	Iván Zamorano
10	FW	BRA	Ronaldo
11	FW	NGR	Nwankwo Kanu
12	GK	ITA	Andrea Mazzantini
13	MF	BRA	Zé Elias
14	MF	ARG	Diego Simeone
15	MF	FRA	Benoît Cauet

No.	Pos.	Nation	Player
16	DF	NGR	Taribo West
17	MF	ITA	Francesco Moriero
18	MF	ITA	Nicola Berti
19	DF	ITA	Massimo Paganin
20	FW	URU	Álvaro Recoba
21	DF	ITA	Luca Mezzano
22	GK	ITA	Raffaele Nuzzo
23	FW	ITA	Maurizio Ganz
24	DF	ITA	Luigi Sartor
27	FW	ITA	Marco Branca
33	DF	ITA	Francesco Colonnese
35	DF	URU	Martin Rivas
36	DF	ITA	Mauro Milanese
40	MF	POR	Paulo Sousa

=== Transfers ===
In
Pos.	Name	from	Type
FW	Ronaldo	Barcelona	U$31,0 million
MF	Diego Simeone	Atletico Madrid	U$6,5 million
FW	Álvaro Recoba	Nacional de Montevideo	U$3,5 million
MF	Zé Elias	Bayer Leverkusen	
MF	Benoît Cauet	Paris Saint-Germain	
DF	Luigi Sartor	Vicenza	U$3,2 million
DF	Taribo West	Auxerre	U$3,0 million
MF	Francesco Moriero	A.C. Milan	co-ownership
DF	André Cruz	Napoli	
DF	Devis Nossa	Orsa Treviglio	
FW	Alessandro Sgrigna	Lodigiani	
MF	Alessandro Conticchio	Gualdo	re-purchased
MF	Fabio Di Sauro	Cremonese	re-purchased
MF	Marco Nichetti	Gualdo	re-purchased
MF	Andrea Zanchetta	Foggia	re-purchased
GK	Marco Fortin	Torres	loan ended
GK	Giorgio Frezzolini	Trapani	loan ended
GK	Raffaele Nuzzo	Gualdo	loan ended
GK	Paolo Orlandoni	Foggia	loan ended
DF	Alessandro Fioretti	Trapani	loan ended
DF	Natale Gonnella	Ravenna	loan ended
DF	Luca Mezzano	Torino	loan ended
DF	Alessandro Pedroni	Cremonese	loan ended
MF	Fabio Cinetti	Torino	loan ended
MF	Pierluigi Orlandini	Hellas Verona	loan ended
MF	Gianni Testa	Frosinone	loan ended
FW	Caio	Napoli	loan ended
FW	Samuel Ipoua	Torino	loan ended
FW	Mohammed Kallon	Lugano	loan ended
FW	Fabrizio Laccetti	Solbiatese	loan ended
FW	Marco Veronese	Monza	loan ended

Out
Pos.	Name	To	Type
MF	Paul Ince	Liverpool	
MF	Ciriaco Sforza	Kaiserslautern	
DF	Jocelyn Angloma	Valencia	
DF	André Cruz	A.C. Milan	
DF	Alessandro Pistone	Newcastle United	
MF	Pierluigi Orlandini	Parma	
FW	Marco Delvecchio	AS Roma	
GK	Christian Berretta	Varese	
GK	Marco Fortin	Giorgione	
DF	Matteo Ferrari	Genoa	
DF	Natale Gonnella	Hellas Verona	
DF	Alessandro Pedroni	Monza	
FW	Caio	Santos	released
MF	Alessandro Conticchio	Lecce	
MF	Gianni Testa	Lodigiani	
GK	Paolo Orlandoni	Acireale	loan
GK	Giorgio Frezzolini	Fidelis Andria	loan
MF	Fabio Cinetti	Chievo Verona	loan
MF	Fabio Di Sauro	Fidelis Andria	loan
MF	Marco Nichetti	Ascoli	loan
FW	Arturo Di Napoli	Vicenza	loan
FW	Mohammed Kallon	Bologna	loan
FW	Marco Veronese	Prato	loan
FW	Samuel Ipoua	Rapid Wien	loan renewal
MF	Andrea Zanchetta	Chievo Verona	co-ownership
FW	Gionatha Spinesi	Castel di Sangro	co-ownership

==== Autumn ====
In
Pos.	Name	To	Type
MF	Paulo Sousa	Borussia Dortmund	U$6,0 million
DF	Mauro Milanese	Parma	loan
DF	Francesco Colonnese	Napoli	
DF	Martín Rivas	Danubio	
GK	Giorgio Frezzolini	Fidelis Andria	loan ended
MF	Marco Nichetti	Ascoli	loan ended
FW	Mohammed Kallon	Bologna	loan ended

Out
Pos.	Name	To	Type
FW	Marco Branca	Middlesbrough	
FW	Maurizio Ganz	A.C. Milan	
MF	Nicola Berti	Tottenham Hostpur	
DF	Massimo Paganin	Bologna	
DF	Massimo Tarantino	Bologna	co-ownership
GK	Giorgio Frezzolini	Udinese	loan
MF	Marco Nichetti	Varese	loan
FW	Mohammed Kallon	Genoa	loan

==== Winter ====
In			
Pos.	Name	from	Type
GK	Sébastien Frey	Cannes	

Out
Pos.	Name	To	Type
GK	Sébastien Frey	Cannes	loan

== Competitions ==
=== Serie A ===
==== League table ====
Pos	Team	Pld	W	D	L	GF	GA	GD	Pts	Qualification or relegation
1	Juventus (C)	34	21	11	2	67	28	+39	74	Qualification to Champions League group stage
2	Internazionale	34	21	6	7	62	27	+35	69	Qualification to Champions League second qualifying round
3	Udinese	34	19	7	8	62	40	+22	64	Qualification to UEFA Cup
4	Roma	34	16	11	7	67	42	+25	59	Qualification to UEFA Cup
5	Fiorentina	34	15	12	7	65	36	+29	57 (Note: Fiorentina finished ahead of Parma on head-to-head points: FIO 1–1 PAR; PAR 1–2 FIO.)	Qualification to UEFA Cup

Source: 1997–98 Serie A, RSSSF.com, Soccerway
Rules for classification: 1) Points; 2) Head-to-head points; 3) Head-to-head goal difference; 4) Goal difference; 5) Goals scored; 6) Draw. (Note: Head-to-head record is used only after all the matches between the teams in question have been played).
(C) Champions

==== Results by round ====
Round	1	2	3	4	5	6	7	8	9	10	11	12	13	14	15	16	17	18	19	20	21	22	23	24	25	26	27	28	29	30	31	32	33	34
Ground	H	A	H	A	H	A	H	A	H	A	A	H	A	H	A	H	A	A	H	A	H	A	H	A	H	A	H	H	A	H	A	H	A	H
Result	W	W	W	W	D	W	W	W	D	W	D	W	L	W	W	L	D	W	L	D	W	L	W	L	W	W	W	W	W	W	L	D	L	W
Position	2	1	1	1	1	1	1	1	1	1	1	1	1	1	1	1	2	2	2	2	2	2	2	3	3	2	2	2	2	2	2	2	2	2

Source: Competitive matches
A = Away; H = Home; W = Win; D = Draw; L = Loss; P = Postponed; = Leader, 1998–99 UEFA Champions League Group stage; = 1998–99 UEFA Champions League Second Qualifying round; = 1998–99 UEFA Cup First round; = 1998–99 Serie B

==== Matches ====
31 August 1997 1	Inter	2–1	Brescia	Milan
16:00 CET	Recoba 80', 85'	Report	Hübner 73'	Stadium: San Siro; Attendance: 69,682; Referee: Pasquale Rodomonti

14 September 1997 2	Bologna	2–4	Inter	Bologna
16:00 CET	R. Baggio 45', 58' (pen.)	Report	Galante 12'; Ganz 38'; Ronaldo 52'; Zamorano 66'	Stadium: Stadio Renato Dall'Ara; Attendance: 36,267; Referee: Stefano Braschi

21 September 1997 3	Inter	3–2	Fiorentina	Milan
16:00 CET	Ronaldo 45'; Moriero 72'; Djorkaeff 81'	Report	Serena 46'; Batistuta 47'	Stadium: San Siro; Attendance: 73,375; Referee: Graziano Cesari

27 September 1997 4	Lecce	1–5	Inter	Lecce
20:30 CET	Palmieri 61' (pen.)	Report	Djorkaeff 33', 78'; Ronaldo 48', 81'; Ganz 84'	Stadium: Stadio Via del Mare; Attendance: 35,535; Referee: Stefano Farina

5 October 1997 5	Inter	1–1	Lazio	Milan
20:30 CET	Ronaldo 41' (pen.)	Report	Nedvěd 35'	Stadium: San Siro; Attendance: 65,656; Referee: Fiorenzo Treossi

18 October 1997 6	Napoli	0–2	Inter	Naples
15:30 CET		Report	Galante 10'; Turrini 69' (o.g.)	Stadium: Stadio San Paolo; Attendance: 55,881; Referee: Pierluigi Pairetto

1 November 1997 7	Inter	1–0	Parma	Milan
14:30 CET	Ronaldo 15'	Report		Stadium: San Siro; Attendance: 72,000; Referee: Piero Ceccarini

9 November 1997 8	Atalanta	1–2	Inter	Bergamo
15:00 CET	Caccia 81'	Report	Djorkaeff 28'; West 88'	Stadium: Stadio Atleti Azzurri d'Italia; Attendance: 23,870; Referee: Pasquale Rodomonti

22 November 1997 9	Inter	2–2	Milan	Milan
20:30 CET	Simeone 13'; Ronaldo 68' (pen.)	Report	Weah 29'; Cruz 80' (pen.)	Stadium: San Siro; Attendance: 80,905; Referee: Pierluigi Collina

30 November 1997 10	Vicenza	1–3	Inter	Vicenza
15:00 CET	Ambrosini 59'	Report	Simeone 33', 39'; Ronaldo 68'	Stadium: Stadio Romeo Menti; Attendance: 19,744; Referee: Alfredo Trentalange

6 December 1997 11	Sampdoria	1–1	Inter	Genoa
14:30 CET	Montella 31' (pen.)	Report	Ronaldo 9'	Stadium: Stadio Luigi Ferraris; Attendance: 35,375; Referee: Fiorenzo Treossi

14 December 1997 12	Inter	3–0	Roma	Milan
14:30 CET	Djorkaeff 40' (pen.); Branca 49'; Petruzzi 71' (o.g.)	Report		Stadium: San Siro; Attendance: 65,846; Referee: Domenico Messina

21 December 1997 13	Udinese	1–0	Inter	Udine
20:30 CET	Bierhoff 90+1'	Report		Stadium: Stadio Friuli; Attendance: 29,123; Referee: Livio Bazzoli

4 January 1998 14	Inter	1–0	Juventus	Milan
20:30 CET	Djorkaeff 47'	Report		Stadium: San Siro; Attendance: 80,569; Referee: Stefano Braschi

11 January 1998 15	Piacenza	0–1	Inter	Piacenza
14:30 CET		Report	70' Moriero	Stadium: Stadio Leonardo Garilli; Attendance: 17,508; Referee: Gennaro Borriello

18 January 1998 16	Inter	0–1	Bari	Milan
14:30 CET		Report	77' Masinga	Stadium: San Siro; Attendance: 63,846; Referee: Stefano Farina

25 January 1998 17	Empoli	1–1	Inter	Empoli
14:30 CET	Esposito 3'	Report	82' Recoba	Stadium: Stadio Carlo Castellani; Attendance: 19,720; Referee: Emilio Pellegrino

1 February 1998 18	Brescia	0–1	Inter	Brescia
14:30 CET		Report	75' Ronaldo	Stadium: Stadio Mario Rigamonti; Attendance: 26,121; Referee: Graziano Cesari

8 February 1998 19	Inter	0–1	Bologna	Milan
14:30 CET		Report	56' Paramatti	Stadium: San Siro; Attendance: 66,327; Referee: Roberto Bettin

11 February 1998 20	Fiorentina	1–1	Inter	Florence
20:30 CET	Batistuta 42'	Report	26' Ronaldo	Stadium: Stadio Artemio Franchi; Attendance: 40,547; Referee: Robert Boggi

15 February 1998 21	Inter	5–0	Lecce	Milan
15:00 CET	Ronaldo 18', 70' (pen.), 79'; Milanese 29'; Cauet 40'	Report		Stadium: San Siro; Attendance: 57,362; Referee: Tarcisio Serena

22 February 1998 22	Lazio	3–0	Inter	Rome
15:00 CET	Fuser 25'; Bokšić 29'; Casiraghi 61'	Report		Stadium: Stadio Olimpico; Attendance: 66,535; Referee: Pierluigi Collina

28 February 1998 23	Inter	2–0	Napoli	Milan
20:30 CET	Zamorano 63'; Ronaldo 73'	Report		Stadium: San Siro; Attendance: 57,564; Referee: Pierpaolo Rossi

8 March 1998 24	Parma	1–0	Inter	Parma
15:30 CET	Crespo 78'	Report		Stadium: Stadio Ennio Tardini; Attendance: 27,924; Referee: Pasquale Rodomonti

14 March 1998 25	Inter	4–0	Atalanta	Milan
15:00 CET	Moriero 66'; Kanu 74'; Ronaldo 78'; Cauet 89'	Report		Stadium: San Siro; Attendance: 60,131; Referee: Massimo De Santis

22 March 1998 26	Milan	0–3	Inter	Milan
20:30 CET		Report	42', 87' Simeone; 77' Ronaldo	Stadium: San Siro; Attendance: 80,227; Referee: Livio Bazzoli

28 March 1998 27	Inter	2–1	Vicenza	Milan
15:00 CET	Simeone 67'; Ronaldo 90+5' (pen.)	Report	Zauli 82'	Stadium: Giuseppe Meazza; Attendance: 64,674; Referee: Domenico Messina

5 April 1998 28	Inter	3–0	Sampdoria	Milan
15:00 CET	Hugo 50' (o.g.); Sartor 53'; Ronaldo 88'	Report		Stadium: Giuseppe Meazza; Attendance: 69,273; Referee: Robert Boggi

11 April 1998 29	Roma	1–2	Inter	Rome
16:00 CET	Cafu 63'	Report	53', 75' Ronaldo	Stadium: Stadio Olimpico; Attendance: 71,766; Referee: Graziano Cesari

19 April 1998 30	Inter	2–0	Udinese	Milan
16:00 CET	Djorkaeff 80'; Ronaldo 85'	Report		Stadium: San Siro; Attendance: 77,172; Referee: Gennaro Borriello

26 April 1998 31	Juventus	1–0	Inter	Turin
16:00 CET	Del Piero 21'	Report		Stadium: Stadio delle Alpi; Attendance: 64,001; Referee: Piero Ceccarini

3 May 1998 32	Inter	0–0	Piacenza	Milan
16:00 CET		Report		Stadium: San Siro; Attendance: 65,484; Referee: Livio Bazzoli

10 May 1998 33	Bari	2–1	Inter	Bari
16:00 CET	Ventola 86'; Masinga 89'	Report	34' Ronaldo	Stadium: Stadio San Nicola; Attendance: 48,614; Referee: Pierluigi Collina

16 May 1998 34	Inter	4–1	Empoli	Milan
16:00 CET	Colonnese 23'; Fusco 31' (o.g.); Ronaldo 62' (pen.), 72'	Report	Cappellini 79' (pen.)	Stadium: San Siro; Attendance: 58,205; Referee: Roberto Rosetti

=== Coppa Italia ===
==== Round of 32 ====
3 September 1997 First leg	Foggia	0–1	Inter Milan	Foggia
20:45 CET			Recoba 21'	Stadium: Stadio Pino Zaccheria; Referee: Pierluigi Pairetto

23 September 1997 Second leg	Inter Milan	3–2 (4–2 agg.)	Foggia	Milan
20:45 CET	Recoba 3' (pen.); Zé Elias 82'; Winter 90+4'		Bergomi 45' (o.g.); Di Michele 67'	Stadium: San Siro; Referee: Pierpaolo Rossi

==== Eightfinals ====
15 October 1997 First leg	Piacenza	0–3	Inter Milan	Piacenza
20:45 CET			Ronaldo 17', 19', 58'	Stadium: Stadio Leonardo Garilli; Referee: Pasquale Rodomonti

18 November 1997 Second leg	Inter Milan	0–1 (3–1 agg.)	Piacenza	Milan
20:45 CET			Stroppa 90'	Stadium: San Siro; Referee: Lorenzo Branzoni

==== Quarter-finals ====
8 January 1998 First leg	Milan	5–0	Inter Milan	Milan
20:45 CET	Albertini 29' (pen.); Ganz 33'; Savićević 44'; Colonnese 46' (o.g.); Nilsen 60'			Stadium: San Siro; Referee: Graziano Cesari

21 January 1998 Second leg	Inter Milan	1–0 (1–5 agg.)	Milan	Milan
20:45 CET	Branca 90'			Stadium: San Siro; Referee: Roberto Bettin

=== UEFA Cup ===
==== First round ====
16 September 1997	Inter Milan (Italy)	2–0	(Switzerland) Neuchâtel Xamax	Milan
20:45 (CET)	Ronaldo 59'; Zé Elias 71'	Report		Stadium: San Siro; Attendance: 30,000; Referee: Karl-Erik Nilsson (Sweden)

30 September 1997	Neuchâtel Xamax (Switzerland)	0–2	(Italy) Inter Milan	Neuchâtel
20:45 (CET)		Report	Moriero 26'; Ganz 69'	Stadium: La Maladière; Attendance: 15,000; Referee: Ryszard Wójcik (Poland)

==== Second round ====
21 October 1997	Inter Milan (Italy)	1–2	(France) Lyon	Milan
20:45 (CET)	Ganz 69'	Report	Giuly 22'; Caveglia 80' (pen.)	Stadium: San Siro; Attendance: 16,085; Referee: Peter Mikkelsen (Denmark)

4 November 1997	Lyon (France)	1–3	(Italy) Inter Milan	Lyon
20:45 (CET)	Bąk 67'	Report	Moriero 9', 69'; Cauet 46'	Stadium: Stade Gerland; Attendance: 29,591; Referee: Bernd Heynemann (Germany)

==== Round of 16 ====
25 November 1997	Strasbourg (France)	2–0	(Italy) Inter Milan	Strasbourg
20:45 (CET)	Baticle 11'; Ismaël 19'	Report		Stadium: Stade de la Meinau; Attendance: 25,101; Referee: Sergei Khusainov (Russia)

9 December 1997	Inter Milan (Italy)	3–0	(France) Strasbourg	Milan
20:45 (CET)	Ronaldo 27'; Zanetti 48'; Simeone 73'	Report		Stadium: San Siro; Attendance: 46,560; Referee: Atanas Ouzounov (Bulgaria)

==== Quarter-finals ====
3 March 1998	Inter Milan (Italy)	1–0	(Germany) Schalke 04	Milan
20:45 (CET)	Ronaldo 17'	Report		Stadium: San Siro; Attendance: 45,000; Referee: Urs Meier (Czech Republic)

17 March 1998	Schalke 04 (Germany)	1–1	(Italy) Inter Milan	Gelsenkirchen
20:30 (CET)	Goossens 90+2'	Report	West 90+1'	Stadium: Parkstadion; Attendance: 56,824; Referee: Gilles Veissière (France)

==== Semi-finals ====
31 March 1998	Inter Milan (Italy)	2–1	(Russia) Spartak Moscow	Milan
20:45 (CET)	Zamorano 45'; Zé Elias 89'	Report	Alenichev 48'	Stadium: San Siro; Attendance: 57,803; Referee: Markus Merk (Germany)

14 April 1998	Spartak Moscow (Russia)	1–2	(Italy) Inter Milan	Moscow
17:30 (CET)	Tikhonov 12'	Report	Ronaldo 45', 75'	Stadium: Dynamo Stadium; Attendance: 36,500; Referee: Hugh Dallas (Scotland)

==== Final ====
6 May 1998	Lazio (Italy)	0–3	(Italy) Inter Milan	Paris
20:45 (CET)		Report	Zamorano 5'; Zanetti 60'; Ronaldo 70'	Stadium: Parc des Princes; Attendance: 44,412; Referee: Antonio López Nieto (Spain)

== Statistics ==
=== Players statistics ===
No.	Pos	Nat	Player	Total		Serie A		Coppa Italia		UEFA Cup	
No.	Pos	Nat	Player	Apps	Goals	Apps	Goals	Apps	Goals	Apps	Goals
1	GK	(Italy) ITA	Pagliuca	49	-42	34	-26	4	-8	11	-8
4	DF	(Argentina) ARG	Zanetti J	41	2	25+3	0	4	0	9	2
2	DF	(Italy) ITA	Bergomi	42	0	28	0	5	0	9	0
24	DF	(Italy) ITA	Sartor	38	1	23	1	6	0	9	0
5	DF	(Italy) ITA	Galante	31	2	20	2	4	0	7	0
16	DF	(Nigeria) NGR	West	34	2	22+1	1	3	0	8	1
17	MF	(Italy) ITA	Moriero	44	6	26+2	3	6	0	10	3
14	MF	(Argentina) ARG	Simeone	41	7	27+3	6	2	0	9	1
8	MF	(Netherlands) NED	Winter	35	1	23+1	0	3	1	8	0
6	MF	(France) FRA	Djorkaeff	42	8	25+4	8	4	0	9	0
10	FW	(Brazil) BRA	Ronaldo	47	34	32	25	4	3	11	6
12	GK	(Italy) ITA	Mazzantini	3	-2	0+1	-1	2	-1	0	0
33	DF	(Italy) ITA	Colonnese	29	1	17+4	1	3	0	5	0
15	MF	(France) FRA	Cauet	42	3	15+13	2	5	0	9	1
7	DF	(Italy) ITA	Fresi	23	0	13+3	0	2	0	5	0
13	MF	(Brazil) BRA	Zé Elias	30	2	12+8	0	3	1	7	1
40	MF	(Portugal) POR	Paulo Sousa	11	0	10+1	0	0	0	0	0
36	DF	(Italy) ITA	Milanese	9	1	5+4	1	0	0	0	0
9	FW	(Chile) CHI	Zamorano	20	3	4+9	1	2	0	5	2
27	FW	(Italy) ITA	Branca	8	1	3+4	1	0	0	1	0
23	FW	(Italy) ITA	Ganz	10	4	3+3	2	1	0	3	2
11	FW	(Nigeria) NGR	Kanu	18	1	3+8	1	2	0	5	0
20	FW	(Uruguay) URU	Recoba	19	5	2+6	3	5	2	6	0
21	DF	(Italy) ITA	Mezzano	8	0	2+2	0	2	0	2	0
18	MF	(Italy) ITA	Berti	4	0	0+4	0	0	0	0	0
22	GK	(Italy) ITA	Nuzzo	0	0	0	0	0	0	0	0
19	DF	(Italy) ITA	Paganin	0	0	0	0	0	0	0	0
35	DF	(Uruguay) URU	Rivas	3	0	0+1	0	1	0	1	0
3	DF	(Italy) ITA	Tarantino	2	0	0	0	2	0	0	0

- Source: http://calcio-seriea.net/rose/1997/1130/

== Sources ==
- RSSSF - Italy 1997/98
