= 1998–99 Inter Milan season =

Inter Milan
1998–99 season
- Owner: Massimo Moratti
- President: Massimo Moratti
- Manager: Luigi Simoni (until 30 November 1998); Mircea Lucescu (until 22 March 1999); Luciano Castellini (until 30 April 1999); Roy Hodgson
- Serie A: 8th
- Coppa Italia: Semi-finals
- UEFA Champions League: Quarter-finals
- Top goalscorer: League: Ronaldo (14); All: Ronaldo (15)
- Average home league attendance: 68,459
Home colours	Away colours	Third colours

The 1998–99 Inter Milan season was the club's 90th in existence and 83rd consecutive season in Serie A, the top flight of Italian football.

== Season ==
Inter continued its increasingly frustrating run without the league title, which was extended to ten years following a chaotic season. Head coach Luigi Simoni was fired when the side did not perform to the expected level, and the season saw a further three coaches trying to tame Inter without any success. Despite the chaos, the side managed to reach the quarter-finals of the UEFA Champions League, where it lost to eventual champions Manchester United.

Another worry was the injury problems affecting star striker Ronaldo, who only played in 19 of the 34 league matches (although in those 19 games he scored 14 goals).

After the season, Inter signed Christian Vieri from Lazio for a world-record transfer fee of £32 million to help with goalscoring, while successful ex-Juventus coach Marcello Lippi was appointed in the hope he could end Inter's title drought.

== Squad ==
Squad at end of season

Note: Flags indicate national team as defined under FIFA eligibility rules; some limited exceptions apply. Players may hold more than one non-FIFA nationality.

No.	Pos.	Nation	Player
1	GK	(Italy) ITA	Gianluca Pagliuca
2	DF	(Italy) ITA	Giuseppe Bergomi (captain)
3	DF	(Italy) ITA	Francesco Colonnese
4	DF	(Argentina) ARG	Javier Zanetti
5	DF	(Italy) ITA	Fabio Galante
6	MF	(France) FRA	Youri Djorkaeff
7	DF	(Italy) ITA	Salvatore Fresi
8	MF	(Netherlands) NED	Aron Winter
9	FW	(Brazil) BRA	Ronaldo
10	FW	(Italy) ITA	Roberto Baggio
11	FW	(Italy) ITA	Nicola Ventola
13	MF	(Brazil) BRA	Zé Elias

No.	Pos.	Nation	Player
14	MF	(Argentina) ARG	Diego Simeone
15	MF	(France) FRA	Benoît Cauet
16	DF	(Nigeria) NGA	Taribo West
17	MF	(Italy) ITA	Francesco Moriero
18	FW	(Chile) CHI	Iván Zamorano (Note: Zamorano had "1+8" printed on the back of his shirt; however, the plus sign was only symbolic and his number was officially listed as 18.)
19	MF	(Portugal) POR	Paulo Sousa
20	MF	(Brazil) BRA	Gilberto
21	MF	(Italy) ITA	Andrea Pirlo
22	GK	(France) FRA	Sebastien Frey
23	DF	(Croatia) CRO	Dario Šimić
24	DF	(France) FRA	Mikaël Silvestre
25	DF	(Italy) ITA	Mauro Milanese (on loan from Parma)

=== Transfers ===
In
Pos.	Name	from	Type
FW	Roberto Baggio	Bologna	€1.80 million
FW	Nicola Ventola	Bari	
MF	Andrea Pirlo	Brescia	
DF	Zoumana Camara	Saint-Étienne	
DF	Mikaël Silvestre	Rennes	
MF	Ousmane Dabo	Rennes	
MF	Cristiano Zanetti	Reggiana	
FW	Gionatha Spinesi	Castel di Sangro	
FW	Mohammed Kallon	Bologna	loan ended
FW	Alonso Piola	Internacional	loan ended
DF	Matteo Ferrari	Genoa	loan ended
GK	Sébastien Frey	Cannes	loan ended
GK	Giorgio Frezzolini	Fidelis Andria	loan ended

Out
Pos.	Name	To	Type
DF	Luigi Sartor	Parma	
FW	Samuel Ipoua	Toulouse	
DF	Massimo Tarantino	Bologna	co-ownership
FW	Gionatha Spinesi	Bari	co-ownership
FW	Mohammed Kallon	Cagliari	loan
GK	Giorgio Frezzolini	Cosenza	loan
DF	Matteo Ferrari	Lecce	loan
DF	Martín Rivas	Perugia	loan

==== Autumn ====
In
Pos.	Name	from	Type

Out
Pos.	Name	To	Type
FW	Nwankwo Kanu	Arsenal	
DF	Salvatore Fresi	Salernitana	loan
MF	Cristiano Zanetti	Cagliari	loan
MF	Ousmane Dabo	Vicenza	loan

==== Winter ====
In
Pos.	Name	from	Type
DF	Gilberto	Cruzeiro	
DF	Dario Šimić	Dinamo Zagreb	

Out
Pos.	Name	To	Type
FW	Álvaro Recoba	Venezia	loan
GK	Andrea Mazzantini	Perugia	
DF	Luca Mezzano	Perugia	loan
GK	Giorgio Frezzolini	Milan	loan

== Competitions ==
=== Serie A ===
==== League table ====
Pos	Team	Pld	W	D	L	GF	GA	GD	Pts	Qualification or relegation
6	Udinese (Note: Udinese gained entry to the 1999–2000 UEFA Cup winning the UEFA Cup qualification match against Juventus)	34	16	6	12	52	52	0	54	Qualification to UEFA Cup first round
7	Juventus (Note: Juventus qualified to the 1999 UEFA Intertoto Cup Third round.)	34	15	9	10	42	36	+6	54	Qualification to Intertoto Cup third round
8	Inter Milan	34	13	7	14	59	54	+5	46	
9	Bologna (Note: Bologna gained entry to the 1999–2000 UEFA Cup winning the cup third place UEFA Cup qualification match against Inter Milan)	34	11	11	12	44	47	−3	44	Qualification to UEFA Cup first round
10	Bari	34	9	15	10	39	44	−5	42 (Note: BAR 1–0 VEN, VEN 2–1 BAR)	

Source: Serie A, RSSSF.com, Soccerway
Rules for classification: 1) Points; 2) Head-to-head points; 3) Head-to-head goal difference; 4) Goal difference; 5) Goals scored; 6) Draw. (Note: Head-to-head record is used only after all the matches between the teams in question have been played).

==== Results by round ====
Round	1	2	3	4	5	6	7	8	9	10	11	12	13	14	15	16	17	18	19	20	21	22	23	24	25	26	27	28	29	30	31	32	33	34
Ground	A	H	A	H	H	A	H	A	H	A	H	A	A	H	A	H	A	H	A	H	A	A	H	A	H	A	H	A	H	H	A	H	A	H
Result	D	W	W	W	L	L	L	D	W	L	W	D	W	W	L	W	L	W	D	W	L	L	D	L	D	L	W	L	D	L	W	L	L	W
Position	6	4	2	2	2	4	6	7	6	6	6	5	5	4	5	4	5	5	5	5	5	6	6	7	8	9	8	9	9	9	8	8	9	8

Source: Competitive matches
A = Away; H = Home; W = Win; D = Draw; L = Loss; = Leader, UEFA Champions League Groups stage; = UEFA Champions League Groups stage; = UEFA Champions League Qualifying round; = 1999–2000 UEFA Cup; = 1999 UEFA Intertoto Cup; = 1999–2000 Serie B

==== Matches ====
13 September 1998 1	Cagliari	2–2	Inter Milan	Cagliari
16:00 CEST	Kallon 31'; Muzzi 42'	Report	Ventola 32'; Ventola 37'	Stadium: Stadio Sant'Elia; Attendance: 30,000; Referee: Florenzo Treossi

20 September 1998 2	Inter Milan	1–0	Piacenza	Milan
20:30 CEST	Ronaldo 66' (pen.)	Report		Stadium: San Siro; Attendance: 66,178; Referee: Emilio Pellegrino

27 September 1998 3	Empoli	1–2	Inter Milan	Empoli
16:00 CEST	Carparelli 13'	Report	Ventola 37'; Bergomi 53'	Stadium: Stadio Carlo Castellani; Attendance: 13,464; Referee: Salvatore Racalbuto

4 October 1998 4	Inter Milan	2–0	Perugia	Milan
15:30 CEST	Zamorano 11'; Djorkaeff 55'	Report		Stadium: San Siro; Attendance: 66,752; Referee: Stefano Farina

18 October 1998 5	Inter Milan	3–5	Lazio	Milan
20:30 CEST	Winter 22'; Ventola 77', 90'	Report	Salas 2'; Nedvěd 29'; Conceição 36', 53'; Mancini 40'	Stadium: San Siro; Attendance: 70,000; Referee: Robert Boggi

25 October 1998 6	Juventus	1–0	Inter Milan	Turin
20:30 CET	Del Piero 87' (pen.)	Report		Stadium: Stadio delle Alpi; Attendance: 58,459; Referee: Domenico Messina

1 November 1998 7	Inter Milan	2–3	Bari	Milan
14:30 CET	Ronaldo 81' (pen.); Colonnese 90'	Report	Zambrotta 46'; Masinga 74', 88'	Stadium: San Siro; Attendance: 65,000; Referee: Stefano Farina

8 November 1998 8	Milan	2–2	Inter Milan	Milan
20:30 CET	Weah 13'; Albertini 60' (pen.)	Report	Ronaldo 7'; Moriero 48'	Stadium: San Siro; Attendance: 80,814; Referee: Daniele Tombolini

15 November 1998 9	Inter Milan	3–0	Sampdoria	Milan
14:30 CET	Djorkaeff 6' (pen.), 17' (pen.); Zamorano 80'	Report		Stadium: San Siro; Attendance: 60,000; Referee: Alfredo Trentalange

22 November 1998 10	Fiorentina	3–1	Inter Milan	Florence
14:30 CET	Padalino 5'; Batistuta 16'; Heinrich 75'	Report	Djorkaeff 3' (pen.)	Stadium: Stadio Artemio Franchi; Attendance: 40,873; Referee: Pasquale Rodomonti

29 November 1998 11	Inter Milan	2–1	Salernitana	Milan
14:30 CET	Simeone 76'; Zanetti 90'	Report	Di Michele 43'	Stadium: San Siro; Attendance: 53,000; Referee: Pasquale Rodomonti

6 December 1998 12	Vicenza	1–1	Inter Milan	Vicenza
14:30	Luiso 21' (pen.)	Report	Silvestre 90'	Stadium: Stadio Romeo Menti; Attendance: 17,379; Referee: Salvatore Racalbuto

13 December 1998 13	Udinese	0–1	Inter Milan	Udine
14:30		Report	Ronaldo 88' (pen.)	Stadium: Stadio Friuli; Attendance: 27,000; Referee: Domenico Messina

20 December 1998 14	Inter Milan	4–1	Roma	Milan
20:30	Cauet 58'; Zamorano 76'; R. Baggio 86'; Zanetti 88'	Report	Paulo Sérgio 38'	Stadium: San Siro; Attendance: 67,797; Referee: Emilio Pellegrino

6 January 1999 15	Parma	1–0	Inter Milan	Parma
14:30	Fuser 54'	Report		Stadium: Stadio Ennio Tardini; Attendance: 29,964; Referee: Alfredo Trentalange

10 January 1999 16	Inter Milan	6–2	Venezia	Milan
14:30	Ronaldo 4' (pen.), 72'; R. Baggio 24'; Zamorano 29', 42', 47'	Report	Maniero 20', 90'	Stadium: San Siro; Attendance: 66,370; Referee: Gennaro Borriello

17 January 1999 17	Bologna	2–0	Inter Milan	Bologna
14:30	Signori 41' (pen.); Bergomi 52' (o.g.)	Report		Stadium: Stadio Renato Dall'Ara; Attendance: 40,000; Referee: Robert Boggi

24 January 1999 18	Inter Milan	5–1	Cagliari	Milan
14:30	R. Baggio 30', 78'; Šimić 60'; Simeone 67', 72'	Report	Muzzi 3'	Stadium: San Siro; Attendance: 58,000; Referee: Alfredo Trentalange

31 January 1999 19	Piacenza	0–0	Inter Milan	Piacenza
14:30 CET		Report		Stadium: Stadio Leonardo Garilli; Attendance: 16,000; Referee: Domenico Messina

7 February 1999 20	Inter Milan	5–1	Empoli	Milan
14:30	Baggio 7'; Simeone 17'; Djorkaeff 35' (pen.), 67', 90'	Report	Carparelli 57'	Stadium: San Siro; Attendance: 65,311; Referee: Daniele Tombolini

14 February 1999 21	Perugia	2–1	Inter Milan	Perugia
15:00	Kaviedes 19'; Rapaić 81'	Report	Djorkaeff 90' (pen.)	Stadium: Stadio Renato Curi; Attendance: 25,000; Referee: Salvatore Racalbuto

21 February 1999 22	Lazio	1–0	Inter Milan	Rome
15:00	Conceição 38'	Report		Stadium: Stadio Olimpico; Attendance: 70,000; Referee: Graziano Cesari

27 February 1999 23	Inter Milan	0–0	Juventus	Milan
20:30		Report		Stadium: San Siro; Attendance: 18,000; Referee: Daniele Tombolini

7 March 1999 24	Bari	1–0	Inter Milan	Bari
15:00	Osmanovski 43'	Report		Stadium: Stadio San Nicola; Attendance: 45,000; Referee: Alfredo Trentalange

13 March 1999 25	Inter Milan	2–2	Milan	Milan
20:30	Ngotty 7' (o.g.); Zanetti 77'	Report	Leonardo 14', 52'	Stadium: San Siro; Attendance: 79,540; Referee: Pierluigi Collina

21 March 1999 26	Sampdoria	4–0	Inter Milan	Genoa
16:00	Montella 12', 56' (pen.), 59'; Ortega 69'	Report		Stadium: Stadio Luigi Ferraris; Attendance: 25,000; Referee: Daniele Tombolini

3 April 1999 27	Inter Milan	2–0	Fiorentina	Milan
20:30	Ronaldo 45' (pen.), 84' (pen.)	Report		Stadium: San Siro; Attendance: 74,000; Referee: Alfredo Trentalange

11 April 1999 28	Salernitana	2–0	Inter Milan	Salerno
16:00	Di Michele 8'; Giampaolo 90'	Report		Stadium: Stadio Arechi; Attendance: 34,787; Referee: Piero Ceccarini

18 April 1999 29	Inter Milan	1–1	Vicenza	Milan
16:00	Ronaldo 42' (pen.)	Report	Beghetto 51'	Stadium: San Siro; Attendance: 65,000; Referee: Gennaro Borriello

25 April 1999 30	Inter Milan	1–3	Udinese	Milan
16:00	Zamorano 53'	Report	M. Amoroso 11' (pen.), 64'; Poggi 87'	Stadium: San Siro; Attendance: 55,000; Referee: Salvatore Racalbuto

2 May 1999 31	Roma	4–5	Inter Milan	Rome
20:30	Totti 26' (pen.); Paulo Sérgio 47'; Delvecchio 49'; Di Francesco 79'	Report	Ronaldo 17', 56'; Zamorano 22', 35'; Simeone 87'	Stadium: Stadio Olimpico; Attendance: 65,000; Referee: Pierluigi Collina

9 May 1999 32	Inter Milan	1–3	Parma	Milan
20:30	Ronaldo 25'	Report	Stanić 47'; Asprilla 49'; Fuser 62'	Stadium: San Siro; Attendance: 65,700; Referee: Salvatore Racalbuto

16 May 1999 33	Venezia	3–1	Inter Milan	Venice
16:30	Volpi 1'; Frey 5' (o.g.); Maniero 19'	Report	Ronaldo 52' (pen.)	Stadium: Stadio Pier Luigi Penzo; Attendance: 12,137; Referee: Massimo De Santis

23 May 1999 34	Inter Milan	3–1	Bologna	Milan
16:30	Ronaldo 8'; Šimić 87'; Ventola 89'	Report	Simutenkov 88'	Stadium: San Siro; Attendance: 62,705; Referee: Pasquale Rodomonti

=== Coppa Italia ===
==== Round of 32 ====
9 September 1998	Inter Milan	1–0	Cesena	Milan
20:30 CET	Zamorano 27'			Stadium: San Siro; Attendance: 23,772; Referee: Alfredo Trentalange

24 September 1998	Cesena	0–0	Inter Milan	Cesena
20:30 CET				Stadium: Stadio Dino Manuzzi; Attendance: 21,369; Referee: Pasquale Rodomonti

==== Round of 16 ====
28 October 1998	Inter Milan	1–0	Castel di Sangro	Milan
20:30 CET	Ventola 26'			Stadium: San Siro; Attendance: 10,000; Referee: Daniele Tombolini

11 November 1998	Castel di Sangro	1–1	Inter Milan	Castel di Sangro
20:30 CET	Bernardi 76'		Djorkaeff 79' (o.g.)	Stadium: Stadio Teofilo Patini; Attendance: 10,000; Referee: Daniele Tombolini

==== Quarter-finals ====
3 December 1998	Lazio	2–1	Inter Milan	Rome
20:30 CET	Salas 13' (pen.), 47'	Report	Djorkaeff 32'	Stadium: Stadio Olimpico; Attendance: 35,000; Referee: Piero Ceccarini

27 January 1999	Inter Milan	5–2	Lazio	Milan
20:30 CET	Cauet 13'; Djorkaeff 26', 69'; Zé Elias 74'; Moriero 90+3'	Report	Vieri 10'; Lombardo 34'	Stadium: San Siro; Attendance: 17,007; Referee: Piero Ceccarini

==== Semi-finals ====
17 February 1999	Inter Milan	0–2	Parma	Milan
20:30 CET		Report	Verón 76'; Balbo 90+6'	Stadium: San Siro; Attendance: 15,053; Referee: Stefano Braschi

9 March 1999	Parma	2–1	Inter Milan	Parma
20:30 CET	Chiesa 4'; Verón 36'	Report	Zamorano 10'	Stadium: Stadio Ennio Tardini; Attendance: 11,419; Referee: Massimo De Santis

==== UEFA Cup qualification ====
27 May 1999	Inter Milan	1–2	Bologna	Milan
	Baggio 59'		Andersson 7'; Paramatti 49'	Stadium: San Siro; Attendance: 62,705; Referee: Robert Boggi

30 May 1999	Bologna	2–1	Inter Milan	Bologna
	Signori 3'; Bettarini 41'		Ventola 90'	Stadium: Stadio Renato Dall'Ara; Attendance: 27,000; Referee: Graziano Cesari

Coppa Italia 3rd place: Bologna

=== UEFA Champions League ===
==== Second round ====
12 August 1998	Inter Milan (Italy)	4–0	(Latvia) Skonto	Pisa
20:30 CEST	Zamorano 6'; Simeone 10'; Ventola 20'; Baggio 59'	Report		Stadium: Arena Garibaldi; Attendance: 16,000; Referee: Fritz Stuchlik (Austria)

26 August 1998	Skonto (Latvia)	1–3 (1–7 agg.)	(Italy) Inter Milan	Riga
20:30 CEST	Miholaps 21'		Zamorano 9'; Galante 53'; Djorkaeff 70'	Stadium: Skonto Stadium; Attendance: 6,500; Referee: Georgios Bikas (Greece)

==== Group phase ====
Pos	Team	Pld	W	D	L	GF	GA	GD	Pts	Qualification	INT	RMA	SPM	STM
1	(Italy) Internazionale	6	4	1	1	9	5	+4	13	Advance to knockout stage	—	3–1	2–1	1–0
2	(Spain) Real Madrid	6	4	0	2	17	8	+9	12	Advance to knockout stage	2–0	—	2–1	6–1
3	(Russia) Spartak Moscow	6	2	2	2	7	6	+1	8		1–1	2–1	—	0–0
4	(Austria) Sturm Graz	6	0	1	5	2	16	−14	1		0–2	1–5	0–2	—

Source: UEFA

16 September 1998 1	Real Madrid (Spain)	2–0	(Italy) Inter Milan	Seville
20:30 CET	Hierro 80' (pen.); Seedorf 90'			Stadium: Ramón Sánchez Pizjuán Stadium; Attendance: 40,000; Referee: Hugh Dallas (Scotland)

30 September 1998 2	Inter Milan (Italy)	1–0	(Austria) Sturm Graz	Milan
20:45 CET	Djorkaeff 90'			Stadium: San Siro; Attendance: 24,791; Referee: Rune Pedersen (Norway)

21 October 1998 3	Inter Milan (Italy)	2–1	(Russia) Spartak Moscow	Milan
20:45 CET	Ventola 32'; Ronaldo 59'	Report	Tsymbalar 65'	Stadium: San Siro; Attendance: 44,199; Referee: Marc Batta (France)

4 November 1998 4	Spartak Moscow (Russia)	1–1	(Italy) Inter Milan	Moscow
20:30 CET	Tikhonov 68'		Simeone 89'	Stadium: Luzhniki Stadium; Attendance: 75,000; Referee: Urs Meier (Czech Republic)

25 November 1998 5	Inter Milan (Italy)	3–1	(Spain) Real Madrid	Milan
20:45 CET	Zamorano 51'; Baggio 86', 90'		Seedorf 57'	Stadium: San Siro; Attendance: 77,820; Referee: Markus Merk (Germany)

9 December 1998 6	Sturm Graz (Austria)	0–2	(Italy) Inter Milan	Graz
20:30 CET			Zanetti 64'; Baggio 80'	Stadium: Arnold Schwarzenegger-Stadion; Attendance: 12,685; Referee: (Poland) Jacek Granat

==== Quarter-finals ====
3 March 1999	Manchester United (England)	2–0	(Italy) Inter Milan	Manchester
	Yorke 7', 45'			Stadium: Old Trafford; Attendance: 54,430; Referee: Hellmut Krug (Germany)

17 March 1999	Inter Milan (Italy)	1–1	(England) Manchester United	Milan
	Ventola 63'		Scholes 88'	Stadium: San Siro; Attendance: 79,528; Referee: Gilles Veissière (France)

== Statistics ==
=== Appearances and goals ===
As of 30 June 1999

No.	Pos	Nat	Player	Total		Serie A		Coppa Italia		Champions League	
No.	Pos	Nat	Player	Apps	Goals	Apps	Goals	Apps	Goals	Apps	Goals
1	GK	(Italy) ITA	Pagliuca	47	0	31	0	6	0	10	0
4	DF	(Argentina) ARG	Zanetti J	50	4	34+2	3	5	0	7+2	1
3	DF	(Italy) ITA	Colonnese	40	1	28+1	1	5	0	6	0
2	DF	(Italy) ITA	Bergomi	37	1	23	1	5	0	9	0
24	DF	(France) FRA	Silvestre	31	1	17+3	1	3+2	0	4+2	0
8	MF	(Netherlands) NED	Winter	42	1	24+5	1	6	0	7	0
14	MF	(Argentina) ARG	Simeone	44	7	28	5	7	0	9	2
15	MF	(France) FRA	Cauet	46	3	22+8	1	3+4	1	9	1
18	FW	(Chile) CHI	Zamorano	38	14	21+4	9	3	2	7+3	3
9	FW	(Brazil) BRA	Ronaldo	28	15	18+2	14	1+1	0	6	1
10	FW	(Italy) ITA	Baggio	35	11	19+6	6	3+1	0	4+2	5
22	GK	(France) FRA	Frey	9	0	5+2	0	2	0	0	0
16	DF	(Nigeria) NGA	West	30	0	20+3	0	3+1	0	3	0
23	DF	(Croatia) CRO	Simic	21	2	18+1	2	2	0	0	0
6	MF	(France) FRA	Djorkaeff	36	14	17+8	8	6	4	5	2
5	DF	(Italy) ITA	Galante	29	1	16+1	0	3	0	9	1
11	FW	(Italy) ITA	Ventola	37	11	14+9	7	5+2	1	3+4	3
19	MF	(Portugal) POR	Paulo Sousa	19	0	10+2	0	4	0	3	0
25	DF	(Italy) ITA	Milanese	15	0	7+1	0	4	0	3	0
17	MF	(Italy) ITA	Moriero	18	2	6+5	1	1+2	1	3+1	0
13	MF	(Brazil) BRA	Zé Elias	23	1	5+9	0	2+3	1	2+2	0
21	MF	(Italy) ITA	Pirlo	32	0	5+15	0	2+3	0	0+7	0
27	MF	(France) FRA	Dabo	8	0	4+1	0	1+2	0	0	0
20	MF	(Brazil) BRA	Gilberto	3	0	2	0	0+1	0	0	0
7	DF	(Italy) ITA	Fresi	5	0	1	0	1	0	2+1	0
26	DF	(France) FRA	Camara	2	0	0	0	2	0	0	0
28	DF	(Italy) ITA	Mezzano	2	0	0	0	1+1	0	0	0
23	MF	(Italy) ITA	Zanetti C	2	0	0	0	0+1	0	0+1	0
20	FW	(Uruguay) URU	Recoba	4	0	0+1	0	1	0	0+2	0
32	FW	(Italy) ITA	Sinigaglia	1	0	0+1	0	0	0	0	0
29	FW	(Nigeria) NGA	Kanu	2	0	1	0	1	0	0	0

Last updated: 30 June 1999
Source: Competitions

== Sources ==
- - RSSSF Italy Championship 1998/99
