= 1999–2000 Inter Milan season =

Inter Milan
1999–2000 season
- Owner: Massimo Moratti
- President: Massimo Moratti
- Manager: Marcello Lippi
- Stadium: San Siro
- Serie A: 4th
- Coppa Italia: Runner-up
- Top goalscorer: League: Christian Vieri (13); All: Christian Vieri (18)
Home colours	Away colours	Third colours

The 1999–2000 season was Inter Milan's 91st in existence and 84th consecutive season in the top flight of Italian football.

== Season ==
Following a poor previous season, Inter welcomed the arrival of Marcello Lippi on the bench. Striker Christian Vieri was acquired from Lazio for €49,000,000 which broke the world transfer record at the time. The other purchases were Di Biagio, Peruzzi, Blanc (France national team captain), Panucci, Jugović, and the winter window added Iván Córdoba and Seedorf.

Vieri proved to be an excellent goalscorer, scoring five times in first the month of the league, bringing Inter to the top of the standings. However, when autumn came, the side lost him and his partner, Ronaldo, to heavy injuries. Inter was not able to retain their advantage: Lazio and Juventus surpassed them, leaving Lippi's side in fourth place. After the regular season, Inter beat Parma in a play-off awarding the last spot of the Champions League: Inter won 3–1, with two goals scored from Roberto Baggio in his last appearance for the side. Inter also had the chance to win a trophy but failed, losing the final of the Coppa Italia to Lazio for a 2–1 aggregate.

== Squad ==
Squad at end of season

Note: Flags indicate national team as defined under FIFA eligibility rules; some limited exceptions apply. Players may hold more than one non-FIFA nationality.

No.	Pos.	Nation	Player
1	GK	ITA	Angelo Peruzzi
2	DF	ITA	Christian Panucci
3	DF	ITA	Francesco Colonnese
4	DF	ARG	Javier Zanetti
5	DF	FRA	Laurent Blanc
6	DF	ITA	Michele Serena
7	MF	ITA	Francesco Moriero
8	MF	YUG	Vladimir Jugović
9	FW	BRA	Ronaldo
10	FW	ITA	Roberto Baggio
11	DF	ITA	Salvatore Fresi
12	GK	ITA	Giorgio Frezzolini
13	DF	CRO	Dario Šimić
14	MF	NED	Clarence Seedorf
15	MF	FRA	Benoît Cauet

No.	Pos.	Nation	Player
16	FW	ROU	Adrian Mutu
17	DF	CIV	Cyril Domoraud
18	FW	CHI	Iván Zamorano (Note: Zamorano had "1+8" printed on the back of his shirt; however, the plus sign was only symbolic and his number was officially listed as 18.)
19	FW	ITA	Nello Russo
20	FW	URU	Álvaro Recoba
21	DF	COL	Iván Córdoba
22	GK	ITA	Fabrizio Ferron
23	MF	ITA	Luigi Di Biagio
25	DF	URU	Martín Rivas
26	MF	ITA	Carlo Raffaele Trezzi
28	MF	ITA	Giuseppe Imburgia
30	MF	POR	Hugo Infante
31	DF	GRE	Grigoris Georgatos
32	FW	ITA	Christian Vieri

=== Left club during season ===
Note: Flags indicate national team as defined under FIFA eligibility rules; some limited exceptions apply. Players may hold more than one non-FIFA nationality.

No.	Pos.	Nation	Player
6	MF	POR	Paulo Sousa (to Parma)
14	MF	FRA	Ousmane Dabo (to Parma)
16	FW	ITA	Davide Sinigaglia (released)
20	MF	ITA	Cristiano Zanetti (to Roma)
21	MF	ITA	Andrea Pirlo (on loan to Reggina)

No.	Pos.	Nation	Player
24	DF	FRA	Mikaël Silvestre (to Manchester United)
26	DF	FRA	Zoumana Camara (on loan to Bastia)
27	DF	NGR	Taribo West (to Milan)
30	DF	ITA	Fabio Galante (to Torino)

=== Transfers ===
In
Pos.	Name	from	Type
FW	Christian Vieri	Lazio	€46.48 million
GK	Angelo Peruzzi	Juventus	€19.00 million
DF	Christian Panucci	Real Madrid	€9.30 million
DF	Laurent Blanc	Marseille	€6.00 million
MF	Vladimir Jugović	Atletico Madrid	€2.00 million
MF	Luigi Di Biagio	Roma	
GK	Fabrizio Ferron	Sampdoria	
DF	Grigorios Georgatos	Olympiacos	€7.00 million
MF	Cyril Domoraud	Marseille	€7.00 million
GK	Luca Anania		-
DF	Salvatore Fresi	Salernitana	loan ended
MF	Ousmane Dabo	Vicenza	loan ended
FW	Álvaro Recoba	Venezia	loan ended
GK	Giorgio Frezzolini	A.C. Milan	loan ended

Out
Pos.	Name	To	Type
DF	Giuseppe Bergomi	-	retired
GK	Gianluca Pagliuca	Bologna	
MF	Youri Djorkaeff	Kaiserslautern	€1.50 million
MF	Diego Simeone	Lazio	€10.90 million
MF	Aron Winter	Ajax	€0.60 million
MF	Zé Elias	Bologna	€0.750 million
MF	Ousmane Dabo	Parma	€15.49 million
DF	Fabio Galante	Torino	
DF	Mauro Milanese	Perugia	
DF	Mikaël Silvestre	Manchester United	€5.70 million
DF	Massimo Tarantino	Bologna	
DF	Gilberto	Vasco da Gama	
MF	Cristiano Zanetti	Roma	co-ownership
DF	Zoumana Camara	Bastia	loan
MF	Andrea Pirlo	Reggina	loan
FW	Nicola Ventola	Bologna	loan
FW	Mohammed Kallon	Reggina	loan
GK	Sébastien Frey	Hellas Verona	loan
GK	Luca Anania	Lecco	loan
DF	Matteo Ferrari	Bari	loan

==== Winter ====
In
Pos.	Name	from	Type
MF	Clarence Seedorf	Real Madrid	€24.01 million
DF	Iván Córdoba	San Lorenzo	€14.00 million
FW	Adrian Mutu	Dinamo București	€6.50 million
DF	Michele Serena	Parma	loan

Out
Pos.	Name	To	Type
DF	Taribo West	A.C. Milan	€2.50 million
MF	Paulo Sousa	Parma	loan

== Competitions ==
=== Serie A ===
==== League table ====
Pos	Team	Pld	W	D	L	GF	GA	GD	Pts	Qualification or relegation
2	Juventus	34	21	8	5	46	20	+26	71	Qualification to Champions League first group stage
3	Milan	34	16	13	5	65	40	+25	61	Qualification to Champions League third qualifying round
4	Internazionale (Note: Internazionale entered the 2000–01 UEFA Champions League after winning the UEFA Champions League qualification match against Parma.)	34	17	7	10	58	36	+22	58	Qualification to Champions League third qualifying round
5	Parma	34	16	10	8	52	37	+15	58	Qualification to UEFA Cup first round
6	Roma	34	14	12	8	57	34	+23	54	Qualification to UEFA Cup first round

Source: Serie A, RSSSF.com, Soccerway
Rules for classification: 1) Points; 2) Head-to-head points; 3) Head-to-head goal difference; 4) Goal difference; 5) Goals scored; 6) Draw. (Note: Head-to-head record is used only after all the matches between the teams in question have been played).

==== Results by round ====
Round	1	2	3	4	5	6	7	8	9	10	11	12	13	14	15	16	17	18	19	20	21	22	23	24	25	26	27	28	29	30	31	32	33	34
Ground	H	A	H	A	H	A	H	H	A	H	A	H	A	A	H	A	H	A	H	A	H	A	H	A	A	H	A	H	A	H	H	A	H	A
Result	W	D	W	W	W	L	L	D	L	W	W	W	L	L	W	L	W	W	W	D	D	W	W	W	D	D	L	D	L	L	W	W	L	W
Position	1	1	1	1	1	2	3	3	6	5	4	4	5	6	6	6	6	4	3	5	5	5	4	3	3	3	4	3	5	6	5	4	4	4

Source: Competitive matches
A = Away; H = Home; W = Win; D = Draw; L = Loss; = Leader, UEFA Champions League Groups stage; = UEFA Champions League Groups stage; = UEFA Champions League Qualifying round; = 2000–01 UEFA Cup; = 2000 UEFA Intertoto Cup; = 2000–01 Serie B

==== Matches ====
29 August 1999 1	Inter	3–0	Hellas Verona	Milan
	Vieri 16', 53', 65'	Report		Stadium: San Siro; Attendance: 67,203; Referee: Stefano Braschi

12 September 1999 2	Roma	0–0	Inter	Rome
		Report		Stadium: Stadio Olimpico; Attendance: 73,260; Referee: Domenico Messina

19 September 1999 3	Inter	5–1	Parma	Milan
	Zamorano 7', 63'; Vieri 17'; Moriero 38'; Thuram 71' (o.g.)	Report	Crespo 14'	Stadium: San Siro; Attendance: 69,084; Referee: Massimo De Santis

26 September 1999 4	Torino	0–1	Inter	Turin
		Report	Vieri 76'	Stadium: Stadio Olimpico Grande Torino; Attendance: 40,452; Referee: Stefano Farina

2 October 1999 5	Inter	2–1	Piacenza	Milan
	Panucci 14'; Ronaldo 69'	Report	Dionigi 81' (pen.)	Stadium: San Siro; Attendance: 69,448; Referee: Alfredo Trentalange

17 October 1999 6	Venezia	1–0	Inter	Venice
	Maniero 46'	Report		Stadium: Stadio Pier Luigi Penzo; Attendance: 12,312; Referee: Pierluigi Collina

23 October 1999 7	Inter	1–2	Milan	Milan
	Ronaldo 20' (pen.)	Report	Shevchenko 28'; Weah 89'	Stadium: San Siro; Attendance: 78,815; Referee: Gennaro Borriello

30 October 1999 8	Inter	1–1	Lazio	Milan
	Zamorano 36'	Report	Pancaro 90'	Stadium: San Siro; Attendance: 76,161; Referee: Fiorenzo Treossi

7 November 1999 9	Bologna	3–0	Inter	Bologna
	K. Andersson 39', 70'; Signori 78'	Report		Stadium: Stadio Renato Dall'Ara; Attendance: 35,626; Referee: Graziano Cesari

21 November 1999 10	Inter	6–0	Lecce	Milan
	Georgatos 1'; Zanetti 11'; Jugović 37'; Zamorano 45'; Ronaldo 49' (pen.); Ronaldo 59'; Recoba 65'	Report		Stadium: San Siro; Attendance: 62,532; Referee: Gennaro Borriello

28 November 1999 11	Reggina	0–1	Inter	Reggio Calabria
		Report	Recoba 89'	Stadium: Stadio Oreste Granillo; Attendance: 27,272; Referee: Livio Bazzoli

5 December 1999 12	Inter	3–0	Udinese	Milan
	Recoba 19'; Vieri 57'; Russo 90'	Report		Stadium: San Siro; Attendance: 59,462; Referee: Pierpaolo Rossi

12 December 1999 13	Juventus	1–0	Inter	Turin
	F. Inzaghi 21'	Report		Stadium: Stadio Delle Alpi; Attendance: 51,905; Referee: Daniele Tombolini

18 December 1999 14	Bari	2–1	Inter	Bari
	Enyinnaya 6'; Cassano 87'	Report	12' Vieri	Stadium: Stadio San Nicola; Attendance: 35,401; Referee: Stefano Braschi

6 January 2000 15	Inter	5–0	Perugia	Milan
	Georgatos 17'; Seedorf 44'; Vieri 57'; Jugović 63'; Hilário 71' (o.g.)	Report		Stadium: San Siro; Attendance: 66,220; Referee: Pasquale Rodomonti

9 January 2000 16	Fiorentina	2–1	Inter	Florence
	Batistuta 37'; Adani 90'	Report	Recoba 71'	Stadium: Artemio Franchi; Attendance: 38,815; Referee: Alfredo Trentalange

16 January 2000 17	Inter	2–1	Cagliari	Milan
	Šimić 3'; Moriero 82'	Report	Oliveira 17'	Stadium: San Siro; Attendance: 58,018; Referee: Pierluigi Collina

23 January 2000 18	Verona	1–2	Inter	Verona
	Laursen 34'	Report	Recoba 48'; R. Baggio 78'	Stadium: Stadio Marcantonio Bentegodi; Attendance: 33,099; Referee: Stefano Braschi

30 January 2000 19	Inter	2–1	Roma	Milan
	Vieri 8'; R. Baggio 42'	Report	Aldair 33'	Stadium: San Siro; Attendance: 67,875; Referee: Salvatore Racalbuto

6 February 2000 20	Parma	1–1	Inter	Parma
	Crespo 90' (pen.)	Report	61' Vieri	Stadium: Stadio Ennio Tardini; Attendance: 28,815; Referee: Pierluigi Collina

13 February 2000 21	Inter	1–1	Torino	Milan
	Vieri 31'	Report	20' Méndez	Stadium: San Siro; Attendance: 66,294; Referee: Massimo De Santis

20 February 2000 22	Piacenza	1–3	Inter	Piacenza
	Delli Carri 69'	Report	Blanc 20', 78'; Vieri 88'	Stadium: Stadio Leonardo Garilli; Attendance: 15,247; Referee: Alfredo Trentalange

27 February 2000 23	Inter	3–0	Venezia	Milan
	Vieri 41'; Zamorano 52'; Vieri 58'; Recoba 83'	Report		Stadium: San Siro; Attendance: 60,093; Referee: Gennaro Borriello

5 March 2000 24	Milan	1–2	Inter	Milan
	Shevchenko 90' (pen.)	Report	43' Zamorano; 63' Di Biagio	Stadium: San Siro; Attendance: 80,736; Referee: Alfredo Trentalange

11 March 2000 25	Lazio	2–2	Inter	Rome
	S. Inzaghi 82'; Pancaro 87'	Report	19' Recoba; 79' Di Biagio	Stadium: Stadio Olimpico; Attendance: 66,491; Referee: Stefano Braschi

18 March 2000 26	Inter	1–1	Bologna	Milan
	Recoba 83'	Report	3' Paramatti	Stadium: San Siro; Attendance: 61,224; Referee: Graziano Cesari

25 March 2000 27	Lecce	1–0	Inter	Lecce
	Sesa 23'	Report	67'Vieri	Stadium: Stadio Via del Mare; Attendance: 28,847; Referee: Gennaro Borriello

2 April 2000 28	Inter	1–1	Reggina	Milan
	Recoba 13'	Report	Possanzini 81'	Stadium: San Siro; Attendance: 67,300; Referee: Pasquale Rodomonti

8 April 2000 29	Udinese	3–0	Inter	Udine
	Sosa 6', 45', 68'	Report		Stadium: Stadio Friuli; Attendance: 27,934; Referee: Salvatore Racalbuto

16 April 2000 30	Inter	1–2	Juventus	Milan
	Seedorf 83'	Report	Kovačević 54', 79'	Stadium: San Siro; Attendance: 79,677; Referee: Fiorenzo Treossi

22 April 2000 31	Inter	3–0	Bari	Milan
	Cauet 24'; Blanc 33'; R. Baggio 51'	Report		Stadium: San Siro; Attendance: 58,009; Referee: Livio Bazzoli

30 April 2000 32	Perugia	1–2	Inter	Perugia
	Amoruso 77'	Report	Seedorf 28'; Recoba 65'	Stadium: Stadio Renato Curi; Attendance: 15,836; Referee: Stefano Farina

7 May 2000 33	Inter	0–4	Fiorentina	Milan
		Report	Chiesa 31', 46'; Batistuta 71'; Bressan 87'	Stadium: San Siro; Attendance: 65,616; Referee: Stefano Braschi

14 May 2000 34	Cagliari	0–2	Inter	Cagliari
		Report	R. Baggio 74' (pen.); Zamorano 87'	Stadium: Stadio Sant'Elia; Attendance: 15,726; Referee: Salvatore Racalbuto

==== UEFA Champions League qualification ====
23 May 2000	Inter	3–1	Parma	Verona
20:30 CEST	Baggio 35', 73'; Zamorano 89'	Report	Stanić 69'	Stadium: Stadio Marcantonio Bentegodi; Attendance: 25,000; Referee: Graziano Cesari

Inter Milan qualified to 2000–01 UEFA Champions League's third qualifying round, while Parma qualified to the 2000–01 UEFA Cup first round.

=== Coppa Italia ===
==== Round of 16 ====
1 December 1999 First leg	Inter	2–1	Bologna	Milan
20:30 CET	Georgatos 9'; Zanetti 35'		80' Ventola	Stadium: San Siro; Attendance: 3,647; Referee: Tarcisio Serena

15 December 1999 Second leg	Bologna	1–3 (2–5 agg.)	Inter	Bologna
20:30 CET	Ingesson 75' (pen.)		41', 91' Vieri; 86' Cauet	Stadium: Stadio Renato Dall'Ara; Attendance: 10,050; Referee: Livio Bazzoli

==== Quarterfinals ====
12 January 2000 First leg	Milan	2–3	Inter	Milan
20:30 CET	Ševčenko 44', 55'		28' Vieri; 54' Mutu; 69' Seedorf	Stadium: San Siro; Attendance: 32,645; Referee: Stefano Farina

27 January 2000 Second leg	Inter	1–1 (4–3 agg.)	Milan	Milan
20:30 CET	Baggio 37'		35' Ševčenko	Stadium: San Siro; Attendance: 63,823; Referee: Fiorenzo Treossi

==== Semifinals ====
9 February 2000 First leg	Cagliari	1–3	Inter	Cagliari
20:30 CET	Modesto 58'		49' Mutu; 60', 90' Vieri	Stadium: Stadio Sant'Elia; Attendance: 20,000; Referee: Alfredo Trentalange

16 February 2000 Second leg	Inter	1–2 (4–3 agg.)	Cagliari	Milan
20:30 CET	Zamorano 10'		20' Sulcis; 26' Corradi	Stadium: San Siro; Attendance: 8,491; Referee: Tarcisio Serena

==== Finals ====
12 April 2000 First leg	Lazio	2–1	Inter	Rome
20:30 CEST	Nedvěd 40'; Simeone 52'	Report	8' Seedorf; 64' Ronaldo	Stadium: Stadio Olimpico; Attendance: 35,000; Referee: Alfredo Trentalange

18 May 2000 Second leg	Inter	0–0 (1–2 agg.)	Lazio	Milan
20:30 CEST		Report		Stadium: San Siro; Attendance: 53,406; Referee: Gianluca Paparesta

== Statistics ==
Overall								Home						Away					
Pld	W	D	L	GF	GA	GD	Pts	W	D	L	GF	GA	GD	W	D	L	GF	GA	GD
34	17	7	10	58	36	+22	58	10	4	3	41	16	+25	7	3	7	17	20	−3

Last updated: 14 May 2000.
Source: Competitive matches

=== Appearances and goals ===
As of 31 June 2001

No.	Pos	Nat	Player	Total		Serie A		Coppa Italia	
No.	Pos	Nat	Player	Apps	Goals	Apps	Goals	Apps	Goals
1	GK	(Italy) ITA	Peruzzi	37	-31	33	-31	4	0
4	DF	(Argentina) ARG	Zanetti	42	2	34	1	7+1	1
5	DF	(France) FRA	Blanc	41	3	34	3	7	0
2	DF	(Italy) ITA	Panucci	31	1	26	1	4+1	0
31	DF	(Greece) GRE	Georgatos	34	3	24+4	2	4+2	1
15	MF	(France) FRA	Cauet	36	2	20+9	1	7	1
23	MF	(Italy) ITA	Di Biagio	36	3	23+6	2	6+1	1
14	MF	(Netherlands) NED	Seedorf	25	5	19+1	3	5	2
18	FW	(Chile) CHI	Zamorano	35	8	22+8	7	3+2	1
32	FW	(Italy) ITA	Vieri	24	18	16+3	13	3+2	5
20	FW	(Uruguay) URU	Recoba	33	10	17+10	10	4+2	0
12	GK	(Italy) ITA	Ferron	8	-6	1+3	-6	4	0
13	DF	(Croatia) CRO	Simic	23	1	19	1	4	0
21	DF	(Colombia) COL	Cordoba	24	0	19	0	5	0
7	MF	(Italy) ITA	Moriero	21	2	14+3	2	3+1	0
8	MF	(Federal Republic of Yugoslavia) YUG	Jugovic	21	2	10+7	2	2+2	0
6	MF	(Portugal) POR	Paulo Sousa	10	0	8+2	0	0	0
11	DF	(Italy) ITA	Fresi	13	0	8+1	0	3+1	0
10	FW	(Italy) ITA	Baggio	23	4	7+11	4	4+1	0
6	DF	(Italy) ITA	Serena	14	0	5+5	0	4	0
9	FW	(Brazil) BRA	Ronaldo	8	3	5+2	3	0+1	0
16	FW	(Romania) ROU	Mutu	14	2	3+7	0	2+2	2
14	MF	(France) FRA	Dabo	10	0	3+5	0	1+1	0
3	DF	(Italy) ITA	Colonnese	11	0	2+5	0	1+3	0
17	DF	(Ivory Coast) CIV	Domoraud	7	0	2+4	0	1	0
19	FW	(Italy) ITA	Russo	2	1	0+1	1	0+1	0
25	DF	(Uruguay) URU	Rivas	0	0	0	0	0	0
12	GK	(Italy) ITA	Frezzolini	0	0	0	0	0	0
27	DF	(Nigeria) NGR	West	0	0	0	0	0	0
29	DF	(Italy) ITA	Lizzori	0	0	0	0	0	0
33	MF	(Italy) ITA	Passiglia	0	0	0	0	0	0
24	DF	(France) FRA	Silvestre	0	0	0	0	0	0
16	FW	(Italy) ITA	Sinigaglia	0	0	0	0	0	0
26	MF	(Italy) ITA	Trezzi	0	0	0	0	0	0

- Source: http://calcio-seriea.net/presenze/1999/1164/
