= Fabio Di Sauro =

Italian footballer

Personal information
- Date of birth: December 19, 1975 (age 50)
- Place of birth: Terracina, Italy
- Height: 1.80 m (5 ft 11 in)
- Position: Defender

Senior career*
Years	Team	Apps	(Gls)
1993–1999	Internazionale	1	(0)
1994–1995	→ Gualdo (loan)	16	(0)
1995–1996	→ Reggina (loan)	27	(0)
1996–1997	→ Cremonese (loan)	29	(0)
1997–1998	→ Fidelis Andria (loan)	14	(0)
1998–1999	→ Cosenza (loan)	23	(0)
1999–2001	A.C. Milan		
1999–2001	→ Arezzo (loan)	59	(0)
2001–2002	Reggiana	30	(1)
2002–2003	Avellino	29	(0)
2003–2004	Viterbese	33	(0)
2004–2005	Benevento	24	(0)
2005–2007	Ancona	20	(0)
2007	Portogruaro	8	(0)
2007–2008	Gela		
- * Club domestic league appearances and goals

Fabio Di Sauro (born December 19, 1975, in Terracina) is a retired Italian professional football player. He last played for Gela.

At first a fullback, he played as a central back in his later career.

== Biography ==
Di Sauro started his career at Internazionale. He was loaned to Serie C1 side Gualdo, then Serie B clubs Reggina and Cremonese. In June 1997, he was about to join Ancona. but left for Fidelis Andria along with Giorgio Frezzolini. The duo also left for Cosenza in 1998. He was also one of the player that sold by Inter to Milan in player exchange, but with inflated nominal transfer fees, made the club gained "false profit" in 2000s (decade). He swapped club with Davide Cordone, made Inter gained €4.6million, but in terms of Cordone's registration rights. In 1999-2000 and 2000–01 season, he was loaned to Arezzo, and met with another AC Milan player Mattia Rinaldini in the 2nd half of 2000–01 season. he then played for Serie C1 clubs and signed by Ancona in summer 2005. In January 2007, he was transferred to Portogruaro in exchange with Gianmario Specchia.
