= Taribo West =

Nigerian footballer

Personal information
- Full name: Taribo West
- Date of birth: 26 March 1974 (age 52)
- Place of birth: Port Harcourt, Nigeria
- Height: 1.86 m (6 ft 1 in)
- Position: Defender

Youth career
- Sharks

Senior career*
Years	Team	Apps	(Gls)
1989	Obanta United		
1990	Sharks		
1991	Enugu Rangers		
1992	Julius Berger		
1993–1997	Auxerre	73	(1)
1997–1999	Inter Milan	44	(1)
2000–2001	AC Milan	4	(1)
2000–2001	→ Derby County (loan)	18	(0)
2001–2002	1. FC Kaiserslautern	10	(0)
2003–2004	Partizan	16	(1)
2004–2005	Al-Arabi		
2005	Plymouth Argyle	4	(0)
2007	Paykan	0	(0)
Total		169	(4)

International career
1993	Nigeria U21		
1996	Nigeria U23	6	(0)
1994–2002	Nigeria	42	(0)
Medal record
Gold medal – first place	Olympic Games	1996
Silver medal – second place	Africa Cup of Nations	2000
Bronze medal – third place	Africa Cup of Nations	2002
- * Club domestic league appearances and goals

Taribo West (born 26 March 1974) is a Nigerian pastor and former professional footballer who played as a defender. He is best remembered for his various unusual and colourful hairstyles.

After winning several major trophies with Auxerre in French football, West went on to play for both Milanese clubs, Inter Milan and AC Milan. He also appeared in the top-level leagues of England and Germany.

At international level, West was capped 42 times for Nigeria between 1994 and 2005, taking part in two World Cups and two African Championships. He also represented his country at the 1996 Olympics, winning a gold medal.

== Club career ==
=== Early years ===
Born in Port Harcourt, West was discovered by Monday Sinclair, who recruited him to play for Sharks. He started playing professionally with Obanta United in 1989, before returning to Sharks in 1990. West then played for Enugu Rangers in 1991, before joining Julius Berger in 1992.

=== Auxerre ===
Following successful trials in early 1993, West joined French side Auxerre led by Guy Roux. He was on the bench during a 2–2 UEFA Cup draw against Tenerife on 15 September 1993, but failed to make his debut. West eventually played his first competitive game for the club in a 0–0 away league draw at Toulouse on 5 March 1994. He became a first team regular in the following season, making 31 appearances in all competitions. In the 1995–96 season, West helped Auxerre win their first league title in the club's history, alongside such players as Laurent Blanc and Sabri Lamouchi, among others. They also won the national cup, thus collecting the double. West subsequently made seven appearances in the 1996–97 UEFA Champions League, as the club was eliminated in the quarter-finals by the eventual champions Borussia Dortmund.

=== Inter Milan and AC Milan ===
In June 1997, West was transferred to Italian side Inter Milan, on a four-year deal. He made his competitive debut for the club in a 1–0 Coppa Italia victory over Foggia on 3 September 1997. Subsequently, West scored his first goal for Inter in a 2–1 Serie A win against Atalanta on 9 November 1997. He also scored the extra time winning goal against Schalke 04 in the 1997–98 UEFA Cup quarter-finals. Eventually, Inter won the competition led by Ronaldo and Iván Zamorano, with West being sent off in the final against Lazio. In the next season, West made 21 league appearances, as the club missed securing a spot in UEFA competitions. He failed to make any appearance in the 1999–2000 season, being three times an unused substitute.

In the 2000 winter transfer window, West switched to Inter's crosstown rivals AC Milan. He made his debut for the club on 24 March 2000, coming on as an injury time substitute for Andriy Shevchenko in a 2–0 win over Juventus. On 14 May 2000, West managed to score his only goal for Milan in a 4–0 victory over Udinese.

=== England and Germany ===
In November 2000, West moved to English club Derby County, on an initial three-month loan. He made his debut for the Rams on 18 November 2000, playing the full 90 minutes in a 2–0 home league win over Bradford City which was Derby's first league win of the season. In January 2001, West signed an extension to stay with the Derbyshire side until the end of the 2000–01 season. He helped the team avoid relegation, making 18 appearances, as Derby won 31 out of their 42 total points with him in the lineup. In May 2001, West eventually left the club because his "international commitments".

In November 2001, West joined German club 1. FC Kaiserslautern on a free transfer. He made his debut for the team in a 5–1 home league win over St. Pauli on 17 November 2001, starting the match and earning a yellow card in the process, before being substituted in the 81st minute. In April 2002, West was released by the club due to their "total disagreement". He made a total of 10 league appearances in the 2001–02 season.

In August 2002, West trained with English side Manchester City for 10 days. He eventually failed to get a contract due to lack of fitness.

=== Partizan ===
On 24 January 2003, it was announced that West would join the reigning FR Yugoslavia champions Partizan under newly appointed manager Lothar Matthäus. He arrived in Belgrade for the final negotiations with the club five days later. On 30 January 2003, West signed an 18-month contract with Partizan. He made his official debut for the club on 1 March 2003, playing the full 90 minutes in a 4–2 home league victory over Radnički Obrenovac. West scored his first goal for Partizan in a 4–0 home league win over Vojvodina on 7 May 2003. Eventually, the club convincingly won the 2002–03 First League of Serbia and Montenegro title. Subsequently, West was one of the most influential players on the way to helping Partizan reach the group stage of the 2003–04 UEFA Champions League, eliminating Newcastle United on penalties in the third qualifying round. He managed to record three appearances in Group F, despite missing numerous games in the first half of the 2003–04 season due to injuries. In February 2004, West left the club by mutual consent.

=== Later years ===
In August 2004, West signed a one-year contract with Qatari club Al-Arabi. He scored his only goal for the side in a 1–1 away league draw at Al-Wakrah on 4 November 2004. West subsequently returned to England, penning a one-year deal with Plymouth Argyle in July 2005. He made his debut for the club on 27 August 2005, picking up a yellow card in a 1–0 loss to Hull City. West appeared in only five games for Plymouth, before his contract was terminated in October 2005.

In January 2007, West was close to signing with Croatian club Rijeka, but failed his medical. He eventually moved to Iran and signed a one-year contract with Paykan in August 2007. West failed to make a start with the club, having his contract terminated by mutual consent only three months later.

In February 2008, West reportedly claimed to be joining Segunda División side Xerez, but the club's president denied any knowledge of the player's arrival.

== International career ==
West was a member of the Flying Eagles at the 1993 African Youth Championship. He then went on to earn 42 full international caps for Nigeria, making his debut in a 3–1 loss to Sweden on 5 May 1994. West was also a member of the Olympic squad that won the gold medal at the 1996 Summer Olympics. He played every single minute of the tournament. Two years later, West was named in the 22-man squad for the 1998 FIFA World Cup, together with Jay-Jay Okocha, Nwankwo Kanu, and others. They reached the second stage of the tournament, but were eliminated by Denmark in the round of 16.

In the 2000 African Cup of Nations, West played the full 90 minutes in all of Nigeria's games in the competition, as they finished runners-up to Cameroon. He also represented his country in the tournament's 2002 edition, finishing in third place. Additionally, West was a member of the team at the 2002 FIFA World Cup. He made two appearances in the "Group of Death", as Nigeria finished bottom of the table, behind Sweden, England and Argentina. After the tournament, Nigeria coach Festus Onigbinde blamed West for the team's failure, stating that the player "flouted' his instructions.

In January 2004, West suffered an injury during the team's training session that ruled him out of the African Cup of Nations. He returned to the national team on 17 August 2005, making his final appearance for the Super Eagles in a friendly against Libya.

== Style of play ==
West was a centre-back and defender. His style of play included winning the ball, tackling, and making forward runs.

== Personal life ==
=== Religion and beliefs ===
A devout Christian, West admittedly used charms before games during his professional career as a footballer. He eventually became a pastor after his footballing days. In 2014, West founded a church called "Shelter in the Storm Miracle Ministries of All Nation" in Lagos.

=== Age controversy ===
In 2010, it was reported that West and other Nigerian internationals, such as Jay-Jay Okocha, Nwankwo Kanu and Obafemi Martins, were much older than they claimed to be. In April 2013, Žarko Zečević, former Partizan general secretary, said that West is 12 years older than his claimed age. Shortly afterwards, West denied the accusation.

== Career statistics ==
=== Club ===
Appearances and goals by club, season and competition
Club	Season	League			National cup		League cup		Continental		Other		Total	
Club	Season	Division	Apps	Goals	Apps	Goals	Apps	Goals	Apps	Goals	Apps	Goals	Apps	Goals
Auxerre	1993–94	French Division 1	1	0	0	0	0	0	0	0	—		1	0
Auxerre	1994–95	French Division 1	23	0	2	0	1	0	5	0	—		31	0
Auxerre	1995–96	French Division 1	22	0	3	0	1	0	4	1	—		30	1
Auxerre	1996–97	French Division 1	27	1	3	0	1	0	7	0	—		38	1
Auxerre	Total		73	1	8	0	3	0	16	1	—		100	2
Inter Milan	1997–98	Serie A	23	1	3	0	—		8	1	—		34	2
Inter Milan	1998–99	Serie A	21	0	4	0	—		3	0	2	0	30	0
Inter Milan	1999–2000	Serie A	0	0	0	0	—		—		—		0	0
Inter Milan	Total		44	1	7	0	—		11	1	2	0	64	2
AC Milan	1999–2000	Serie A	4	1	0	0	—		0	0	0	0	4	1
Derby County (loan)	2000–01	Premier League	18	0	1	0	1	0	—		—		20	0
1. FC Kaiserslautern	2001–02	Bundesliga	10	0	2	0	—		—		—		12	0
Partizan	2002–03	First League of Serbia and Montenegro	11	1	0	0	—		0	0	—		11	1
Partizan	2003–04	First League of Serbia and Montenegro	5	0	0	0	—		7	0	—		12	0
Partizan	Total		16	1	0	0	—		7	0	—		23	1
Al-Arabi	2004–05	Qatar Stars League							—		—			
Plymouth Argyle	2005–06	Championship	4	0	0	0	1	0	—		—		5	0
Paykan	2007–08	Persian Gulf Cup	0	0	0	0	—		—		—		0	0
Career total			169	4	18	0	5	0	34	2	2	0	228	6

=== International ===
Appearances and goals by national team and year
National team	Year	Apps	Goals
Nigeria	1994	1	0
Nigeria	1995	1	0
Nigeria	1996	1	0
Nigeria	1997	4	0
Nigeria	1998	7	0
Nigeria	1999	3	0
Nigeria	2000	7	0
Nigeria	2001	7	0
Nigeria	2002	10	0
Nigeria	2003	0	0
Nigeria	2004	0	0
Nigeria	2005	1	0
Total		42	0

== Honours ==
Auxerre

- French Division 1: 1995–96
- Coupe de France: 1993–94, 1995–96

Inter Milan

- UEFA Cup: 1997–98

Partizan

- First League of Serbia and Montenegro: 2002–03

Nigeria U23

- Olympic Games: 1996

Nigeria

- Afro-Asian Cup of Nations: 1995
- Africa Cup of Nations runner-up: 2000; third place: 2002
