= Pietro Fusco =

Italian footballer

Personal information
- Date of birth: 11 August 1971 (age 55)
- Place of birth: Naples, Italy
- Height: 1.70 m (5 ft 7 in)
- Position: Defender

Youth career
- –1988: Napoli

Senior career*
Years	Team	Apps	(Gls)
1988–1989	Napoli	0	(0)
1989–1992	Lanciano	68	(6)
1992–1997	Castel di Sangro	130	(4)
1997–2002	Empoli	160	(1)
2003	Lucchese	14	(0)
2003–2004	Catania	31	(0)
2004–2005	Pescara	32	(0)
2005–2007	Spezia	49	(0)
2007–2008	Carrarese	25	(0)
2008–2009	Spezia	22	(0)
Total		531	(11)

Managerial career
- 2009–2013: Spezia (youth)
- 2015–2017: Spezia (sports director)
- 2018–2021: Sambenedettese (sports director)
- 2021–2023: Cavese (sports director)
- 2023: San Marzano (sports director)
- 2024–: Scafatese (sports director)
- * Club domestic league appearances and goals

Pietro Fusco (born 11 August 1971) is an Italian former professional footballer who played as a defender.

== Career ==
Revealed by Napoli, Pietro Fusco stood out, making more than 100 appearances for both Castel di Sangro and Empoli, the team for which he played his only season in Serie A. He also had a remarkable spell at Spezia, where he participated in the Serie C1 title in 2005–06 season.

== Post career ==
After retiring as a player from Spezia, Fusco became a coach in the club's youth sectors, becoming an interim member of the main team in 2011 after the dismissal of Elio Gustinetti. He later served as Spezia's own sporting director until 2017, in addition to the same role in Sambenedettese and Cavese. Fusco last club was with Scafatese in Serie D.

== Honours ==
Spezia

- Serie C1: 2005–06 (group A)
- Supercoppa di Serie C: 2006
