= Álvaro Recoba =

Uruguayan footballer (born 1976)

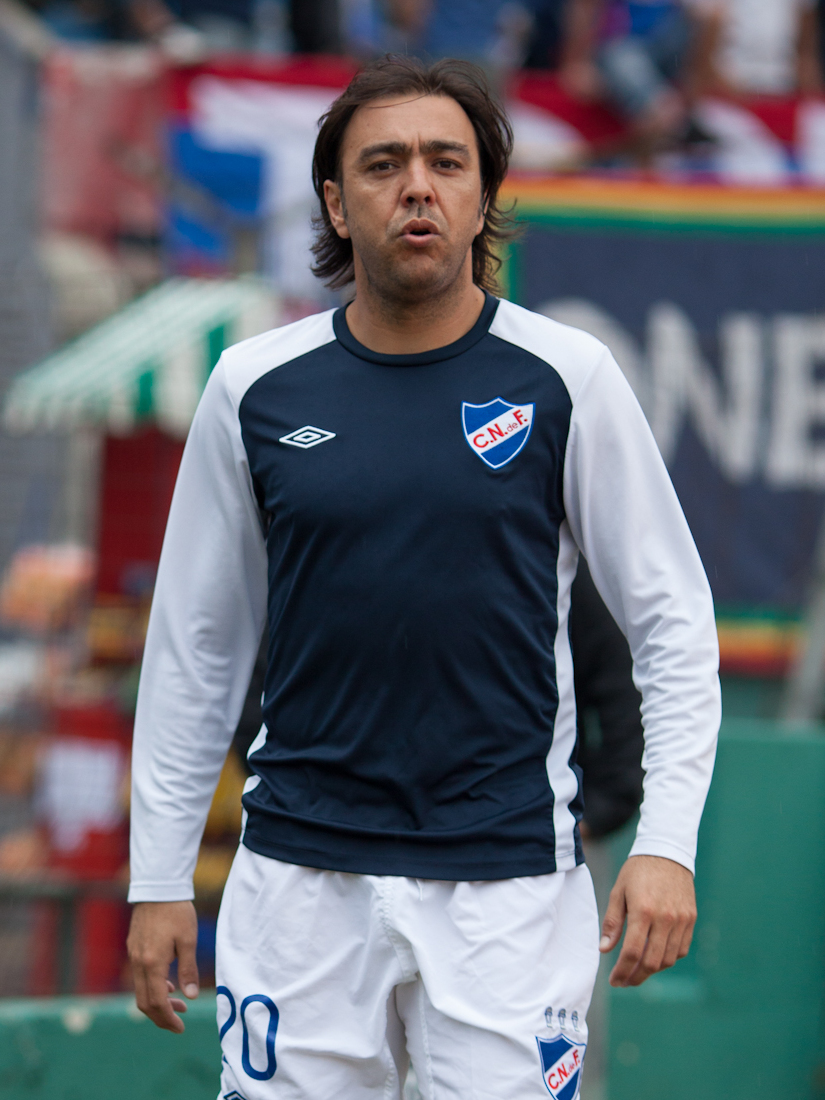
- Recoba with Nacional in 2012

Personal information
- Full name: Álvaro Alexánder Recoba Rivero
- Date of birth: 17 March 1976 (age 50)
- Place of birth: Montevideo, Uruguay
- Height: 1.77 m (5 ft 10 in)
- Positions: Attacking midfielder; forward

Team information
- Current team: Deportivo Táchira (manager)

Youth career
- Danubio

Senior career*
Years	Team	Apps	(Gls)
1994–1995	Danubio	34	(11)
1996–1997	Nacional	33	(17)
1997–2008	Inter Milan	175	(53)
1999	→ Venezia (loan)	19	(11)
2007–2008	→ Torino (loan)	22	(1)
2008–2010	Panionios	21	(5)
2010–2011	Danubio	31	(11)
2011–2015	Nacional	82	(17)
Total		417	(126)

International career
1995–2007	Uruguay	69	(11)

Managerial career
- 2020–2022: Nacional (assistant)
- 2022–2023: Nacional (reserves)
- 2023–2024: Nacional
- 2026–: Deportivo Táchira
- * Club domestic league appearances and goals

Álvaro Alexánder Recoba Rivero (Spanish pronunciation: [ˈalβaɾo aleɣˈsandeɾ reˈkoβa riˈβeɾo]; born 17 March 1976; nickname "El Chino") is a Uruguayan professional football coach and former player, who played as a forward or midfielder. He is the current manager of Deportivo Táchira in Venezuela. He is considered one of the greatest Uruguayan players of all time and is known for his free-kicks.

He began his footballing career with Danubio and then Nacional in his native Uruguay, before moving to Italian side Inter Milan, who he played for between 1997 and 2008, playing 261 competitive games and scoring 72 goals. With the club, he won the Serie A twice, the Coppa Italia twice, and the 1997–98 UEFA Cup. He then played for Torino in Italy and Panionios in Greece before returning to end his career in Uruguay with Danubio and then Nacional.

At international level, Recoba played 69 games for the Uruguay national team between 1995 and 2007, participating at the 2002 FIFA World Cup and two Copa América tournaments.

== Club career ==
=== Early career ===
Recoba started his career with Uruguay's Danubio. After several years in the Danubio youth teams, he appeared on the first team at age 17 and played for two full seasons, 1994–95 and 1995–96. At the start of the 1996–97 season, Danubio agreed to transfer Recoba to Nacional. The following season, Nacional agreed to send Recoba to Italy's Serie A club Inter Milan.

=== Inter Milan ===
Recoba made his Inter debut on the same day as Ronaldo, on 31 August 1997, coming on as a substitute against Brescia at the San Siro. He scored two goals in the last ten minutes of the match: one, a powerful 30-yard shot that flew past the keeper, the next, a free-kick into the top corner after a Cristiano Doni foul. The goals allowed Inter to come back and win the match 2–1.

=== Loan to Venezia ===
After two seasons with Inter, Recoba was loaned out to relegation-battling Venezia for the second round of the 1998–99 Serie A. The striker scored 11 times and made 9 assists in 19 games. Eventually, Venezia escaped relegation that season.

=== Return to Inter Milan ===
After his tenure at Venezia, Recoba returned to Inter. In January 2001, he renewed his contract with the club until 30 June 2006. During the same month, he was accused of carrying a fake passport and lost the Italian nationality he had received in 1999. The Italian Football Federation penalised Recoba with a one-year ban, which was later reduced on appeal to four months. Overall, he played for Inter Milan for eleven seasons, from 1997 to 2007.

On 16 March 2007, Recoba confirmed to Sky Italia he wanted to leave the team at the end of the 2006–07 season, citing lack of appearances with the first team. On 31 August 2007, he was loaned to Serie A club Torino, where he rejoined Walter Novellino, his previous boss at Venezia.

=== Torino ===
Recoba scored his first goal for the club in the second match of the season, a 1–1 draw with Palermo, after a good combination between himself and Alessandro Rosina. On 19 December 2007, Recoba gave a top-class performance against Roma in the Coppa Italia, scoring two excellent goals in Torino's 3–1 win. However, his performances have been disappointing due to injuries and lack of playing time; he did not make the expected impact despite a solid start to the season, and finished the season out of the club's starting 11.

=== Panionios ===
On 5 September 2008, Recoba signed for Greek top division club Panionios, where he joined Greek international and former Inter teammate Lampros Choutos, as well as Uruguay national team player Fabián Estoyanoff. He made his debut in a 2–1 win against Aris on 18 October 2008. He proved his quality by assisting both goals for teammates Giannis Maniatis and Anderson Gonzaga. In his next match, Recoba inspired Panionios to a 5–2 away win against Ergotelis, where he scored two goals. He finished the season with five goals and seven assists, despite continuous fitness problems.

On 9 June 2009, Recoba agreed to remain at Panionios for the following season, as per the terms of his original contract. On 6 December 2009, and after being constantly injured, Recoba came to an agreement with the club to mutually rescind his contract on 16 December 2009. Panionios stated the termination was "friendly" and that they "were honoured" by his association with the club despite his injury-riddled spell.

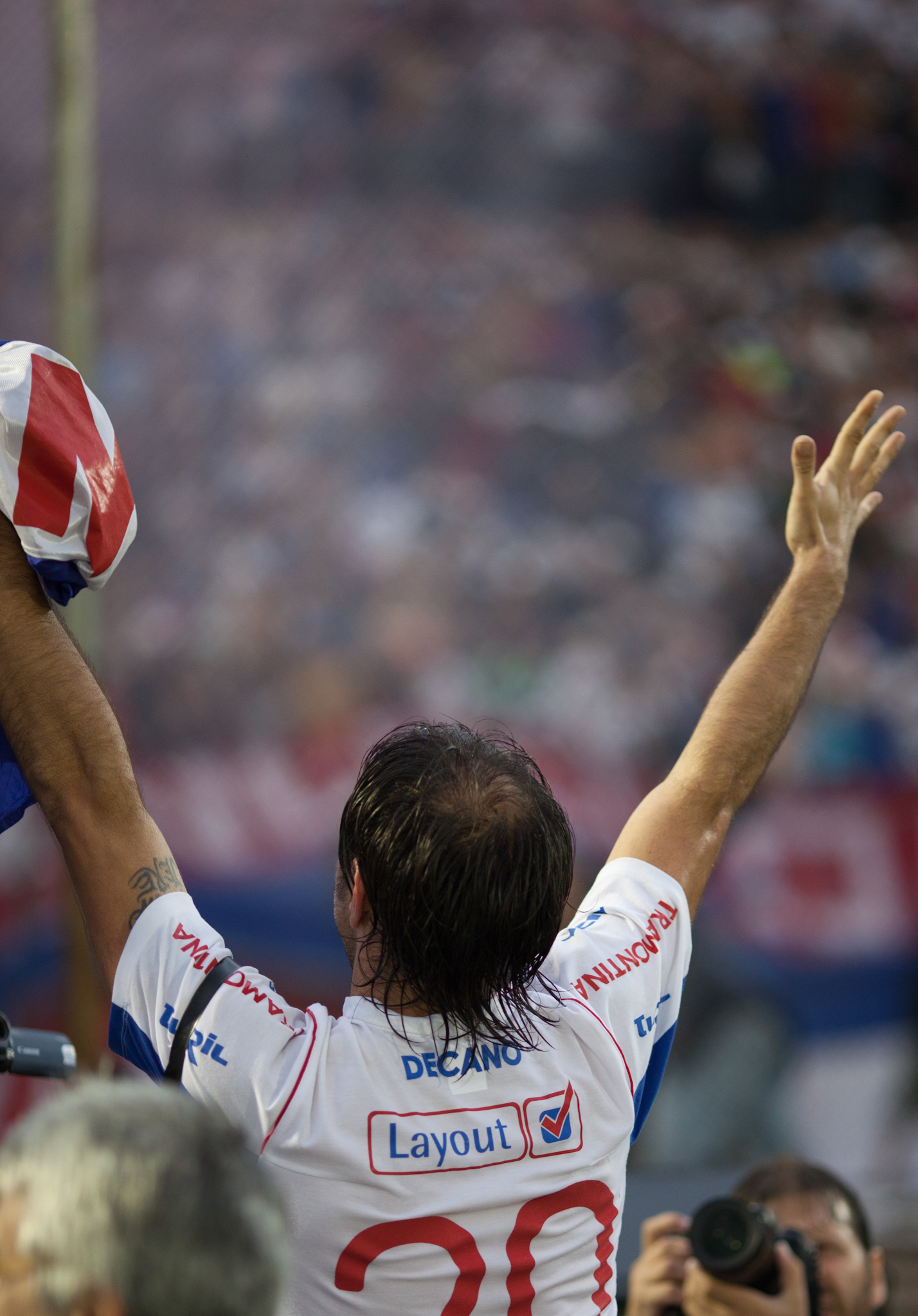
Recoba playing for Nacional

=== Back to Uruguay ===
After nine days without a club, Recoba announced on 24 December 2009 that he would sign with Danubio, where he had played from 1993 to 1995. In July 2011, Recoba signed for former club Nacional. He appeared in many matches coming on from the bench, but still helped the team to win the Torneo Apertura. Recoba scored the second goal in the clásico victory 2–1 against Peñarol by taking a penalty kick during stoppage time. The result allowed Nacional to surpass Peñarol in the tournament table. He also scored the only goal in the last game against Liverpool. During the Torneo Clausura, he started more matches, scoring the third and definitive goal of that tournament's clásico, which ended ending 3–2 for Nacional. He scored the only goal in the final game of 2011–12 Campeonato Uruguayo against Defensor Sporting Club on 16 June 2012. During the Uruguayan Clásico on 9 November 2014, at almost age 38, Recoba scored a 30-yard free-kick in the fifth minute of stoppage time to win the match for Nacional.

== International career ==
Recoba made his debut for Uruguay on 18 January 1995 in a friendly match against Spain (2–2) at the Estadio Riazor, A Coruña, replacing Enzo Francescoli in the 65th minute. He played at the 2002 FIFA World Cup. His only goal at the tournament came against Senegal in Uruguay's final group stage match, but it was not enough as the match finished in a 3–3 draw and eliminated Uruguay in the first round.

In September 2005, Recoba scored the winning goal against Argentina in a 2006 World Cup qualifying match. This helped Uruguay qualify as South America's fifth-placed team and put them in position to play for the intercontinental play-off against Oceania Football Confederation champions Australia. However, Uruguay lost 4–2 in a penalty shootout after a draw in aggregate score. Recoba was substituted off in the second leg of the playoff for Marcelo Zalayeta after 73 minutes. When he was interviewed for the Australian documentary November 16 in 2015, Recoba indicated his displeasure at the decision to replace him, saying, "I was OK. I had the will to keep going. I was disappointed to come off in a game like that."

After the 2006 World Cup, and despite his lack of appearances in Inter's playing squad, Recoba was again picked for the Uruguay national team. He scored his 12th international goal in a 2–1 victory on 2 June 2007, in a friendly against Australia and he also appeared for Uruguay in the 2007 Copa América, where Uruguay finished fourth. In total, Recoba was capped 69 times with Uruguay.

== Retirement ==
Recoba played his last match as a professional footballer on 31 March 2016 at age 40, at the Estadio Gran Parque Central in Montevideo. The occasion was an exhibition game, organized by Nacional, between one team of current and former Nacional players, with Hugo de León, Felipe Revelez, "Cacique" Medina, among others, and a team of Amigos del Chino which included international stars Juan Román Riquelme, Christian Vieri, Carlos Valderrama, Juan Sebastián Verón and Iván Zamorano.

== Style of play ==
Considered a technically gifted offensive midfield playmaker capable of scoring and creating goals, Recoba's main strengths were dribbling, ball control, pace, his long passing and crossing ability, and his powerful and accurate left-footed striking ability from outside the area. He specialised in set-piece, penalty kicks, and corner-kicks, and was renowned for his curling free-kicks. Recoba played in several offensive positions, including as an attacking midfielder, a supporting striker, and a winger. For a period, he was the highest-paid footballer in the world.

Recoba was often injury-prone throughout his career, and was also criticised for his poor work-rate and inconsistency, which has led pundits and managers to accuse him of not fulfilling his potential.

== Managerial career ==
On 20 October 2023, after being an assistant and manager of the reserve team, Recoba was appointed manager of Nacional. He left the club by mutual consent on 10 June of the following year.

In May 2025, it was announced that Recoba will be the technical director of Deportivo LSM, a new soccer team established by Luis Suárez. On 19 November, he returned to managerial duties after being appointed in charge of Venezuelan club Deportivo Táchira for the upcoming season.

== Personal life ==
Recoba's sons Julio , Bryan Alexander Recoba and Jeremía are also footballers.

== Career statistics ==
=== Club ===
Club	Season	League			National cup (Note: Includes Coppa Italia, Greek Football Cup)		Continental		Other		Total	
Club	Season	Division	Apps	Goals	Apps	Goals	Apps	Goals	Apps	Goals	Apps	Goals
Danubio	1994	Primera División	14	6	—		—		—		14	6
Danubio	1995	Primera División	20	5	—		—		—		20	5
Danubio	Total		34	11	—		—		—		34	11
Nacional	1996	Primera División	20	8	—		2	0	7	6	29	14
Nacional	1997	Primera División	10	9	—		8 (Note: Appearances in Copa Libertadores)	3	—		18	12
Nacional	Total		30	17	—		8	3	7	6	47	26
Inter Milan	1997–98	Serie A	8	3	5	2	6 (Note: Appearances in UEFA Cup)	0	—		19	5
Inter Milan	1998–99	Serie A	1	0	1	0	2 (Note: Appearances in UEFA Champions League)	0	—		4	0
Inter Milan	1999–2000	Serie A	27	10	6	0	—		1 (Note: Appearance in Serie A play-off)	0	34	10
Inter Milan	2000–01	Serie A	29	8	3	2	9 (Note: One appearance in UEFA Champions League, eight appearances and five goals in UEFA Cup)	5	—		41	15
Inter Milan	2001–02	Serie A	18	6	0	0	4	0	—		22	6
Inter Milan	2002–03	Serie A	27	9	1	0	14	3	—		42	12
Inter Milan	2003–04	Serie A	19	8	3	0	7 (Note: Three appearances and one goal in UEFA Champions League, four appearances and two goals in UEFA Cup)	3	—		29	11
Inter Milan	2004–05	Serie A	13	3	4	2	5	1	—		22	6
Inter Milan	2005–06	Serie A	20	5	2	0	7	1	1 (Note: Appearance in Supercoppa Italiana)	0	30	6
Inter Milan	2006–07	Serie A	13	1	3	0	2	0	—		18	1
Inter Milan	Total		175	53	28	6	56	13	2	0	261	72
Venezia (loan)	1998–99	Serie A	19	11	0	0	—		—		19	11
Torino (loan)	2007–08	Serie A	22	1	2	2	—		—		24	3
Panionios	2008–09	Super League Greece	14	4	2	1	—		—		16	5
Panionios	2009–10	Super League Greece	5	0	0	0	—		—		5	0
Panionios	Total		19	4	2	1	—		—		21	5
Danubio	2009–10	Primera División	13	5	—		—		—		13	5
Danubio	2010–11	Primera División	18	5	—		—		—		18	5
Danubio	Total		31	10	—		—		—		31	10
Nacional	2011–12	Primera División	23	7	—		1 (Note: Appearance in Copa Sudamericana)	0	1 (Note: Appearance in Primera División play-offs)	1	25	8
Nacional	2012–13	Primera División	21	5	—		9 (Note: Appearances in Copa Libertadores and Copa Sudamericana)	1	—		30	6
Nacional	2013–14	Primera División	19	2	—		3	0	1	0	23	2
Nacional	2014–15	Primera División	17	2	—		1	0	1	0	19	2
Nacional	Total		80	16	—		14	1	3	1	97	18
Career total			413	123	32	9	78	17	5	1	528	150

=== International ===
Uruguay
Year	Apps	Goals
1995	2	0
1996	3	3
1997	12	3
1998	0	0
1999	2	0
2000	9	1
2001	11	1
2002	7	1
2003	8	0
2004	4	0
2005	6	1
2006	0	0
2007	5	1
Total	69	11

International goals Source:

Scores and results list Uruguay's goal tally first. Score column indicates score after each Recoba goal.

#	Date	Venue	Opponent	Score	Result	Competition
1.	17 July 1996	Workers' Stadium, Beijing, China	China	1–0	1–1	Friendly
2.	25 August 1996	Osaka Nagai Stadium, Osaka, Japan	Japan	1–1	3–5	Friendly
3.	25 August 1996	Osaka Nagai Stadium, Osaka, Japan	Japan	3–4	3–5	Friendly
4.	15 June 1997	Estadio Olímpico Patria, Sucre, Bolivia	Venezuela	1–0	2–0	1997 Copa América
5.	10 September 1997	Estadio Nacional, Lima, Peru	Peru	1–0	1–2	1998 FIFA World Cup qualification
6.	17 December 1997	King Fahd II Stadium, Riyadh, Saudi Arabia	South Africa	2–1	4–3	1997 FIFA Confederations Cup
7.	17 February 2000	Estadio Campus Municipal, Maldonado, Uruguay	Hungary	1–0	2–0	Friendly
8.	4 September 2001	Estadio Nacional, Lima, Peru	Peru	2–0	2–0	2002 FIFA World Cup qualification
9.	11 June 2002	Suwon World Cup Stadium, Suwon, South Korea	Senegal	3–3	3–3	2002 FIFA World Cup
10.	12 October 2005	Estadio Centenario, Montevideo, Uruguay	Argentina	1–0	1–0	2006 FIFA World Cup qualification
11.	2 June 2007	Telstra Stadium, Sydney, Australia	Australia	2–1	2–1	Friendly

=== Managerial ===
As of 7 December 2023

Team	Nat	From	To	Record							
Team	Nat	From	To	P	W	D	L	GF	GA	GD	W%
Nacional	(Uruguay)	20 October 2023	Present	10	5	3	2	18	11	+7	50.0
Total				10	5	3	2	18	11	+7	50.0

== Honours ==
Inter Milan

- Serie A: 2005–06, 2006–07
- Coppa Italia: 2004–05, 2005–06
- Supercoppa Italiana: 2005, 2006
- UEFA Cup: 1997–98

Nacional

- Uruguayan Primera División: 2011–12, 2014–15

Individual

- IFFHS Uruguayan Men's Dream Team (Team B)
- Top scorer in the Pre-Libertadores de América League: 1996
- Top scorer in the Apertura Tournament: 1997
- Top scorer for Nacional in the Apertura Tournament: 1997
- Second top scorer for Venezia: 1998–99
- Second top scorer for Inter: 1999–00, 2000–01, 2002–03, 2003–04
- Second top scorer for Panionios in the Greek Super League: 2008–09
- Second top scorer for Danubio in the Clausura Tournament: 2009–10
- Second top scorer for Danubio in the Clausura Tournament Clausura: 2010–11
- Nacional's second-highest scorer in the Apertura Tournament: 2011–12
- Best player in the Uruguayan Championship: 2011–12
- Best playmaker in the Uruguayan Championship: 2011–12
- El País' Uruguayan Footballer of the Year: 2012
- Nacional's second-highest scorer in the Apertura Tournament: 2012–13
- Uruguayan player to score more than one Olympic goal in a championship with Nacional: 2012–13
