= Hilário Leal =

Portuguese football director and former player (born 1974)

Hilário
Personal information
- Full name: Hilário Paulino Neves Freitas Leal
- Date of birth: 15 May 1974 (age 52)
- Place of birth: Ajaccio, France
- Height: 1.72 m (5 ft 7 1/2 in)
- Position: Right back

Youth career
- 1986–1992: Freamunde

Senior career*
Years	Team	Apps	(Gls)
1992–1996	Freamunde		
1996–1999	Chaves	38	(0)
1999–2002	Perugia	22	(0)
2002–2003	Maia	12	(0)
2003–2005	Sambenedettese		
2005–2007	Famalicão	20	(0)
2007–2011	Santa Maria	51	(0)
- * Club domestic league appearances and goals

Hilário Paulino Neves Freitas Leal (born 15 May 1974), simply known as Hilário, is a Portuguese retired footballer who played as a right back.

== Football career ==
Hilário was born to Portuguese parents in Ajaccio, Corsica, France, returning to his motherland still as an infant. He made his professional debuts with local S.C. Freamunde, playing third division football with the club. In 1996, he moved straight into the top level with G.D. Chaves, appearing regularly in two of his three seasons and being relegated in his last, although he had already signed in January 1999 for A.C. Perugia in Italy.

With the Umbrians Hilário played in the 1999 UEFA Intertoto Cup, with his team being eliminated by Trabzonspor in the third round. He only appeared regularly in his first full season in Serie A (20 games), helping the side to a final midtable position and sharing teams with the likes of Hidetoshi Nakata, Alessandro Calori, Giovanni Tedesco, Massimiliano Esposito and Milan Rapaić; he never scored a goal for the club, but netted one in his own net against Inter Milan on 6 January 2000.

In 2002 Hilário moved back to Portugal, playing for F.C. Maia in division two before returning to Italy a year later, representing S.S. Sambenedettese Calcio in two Serie C seasons. Again in his country at the age of 31, he signed for F.C. Famalicão, switching in 2007 to Santa Maria F.C. in amateur football (fourth division).

In 2012 Hilário returned to Freamunde, being appointed its director of football.

== See also ==
- List of foreign Serie A players
