= Giovanni Sulcis =

Italian footballer

Personal information
- Date of birth: 17 June 1975 (age 51)
- Place of birth: Bosa, Italy
- Height: 1.80 m (5 ft 11 in)
- Position: Midfielder

Senior career*
Years	Team	Apps	(Gls)
1995–1998	Cagliari		
1996–1997	→ Torres (loan)		
1997–1998	→ Atletico Catania (loan)		
1998–1999	Chievo Verona		
1999–2002	Cagliari		
2002–2004	Perugia		
- * Club domestic league appearances and goals

Giovanni Sulcis (born 17 June 1975) is a retired Italian football midfielder.
