= Gionatha Spinesi =

Italian footballer

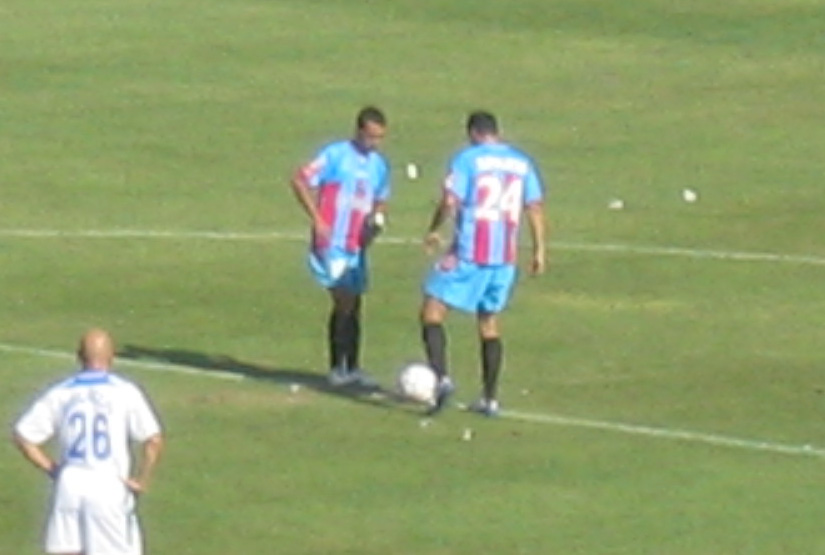
- Spinesi with Catania

Personal information
- Date of birth: 9 March 1978 (age 48)
- Place of birth: Pisa, Italy
- Height: 1.85 m (6 ft 1 in)
- Position: Forward

Senior career*
Years	Team	Apps	(Gls)
1994–1995	Pisa	10	(4)
1995–1996	Inter Milan	0	(0)
1997–1998	Castel di Sangro	52	(8)
1998–2004	Bari	125	(67)
2004–2005	Arezzo	39	(22)
2005–2009	Catania	94	(47)
Total		320	(148)

International career
	Italy U-21	8	(5)
- * Club domestic league appearances and goals

Gionatha Spinesi (born 9 March 1978) is an Italian former professional footballer who played as a forward.

== Career ==
Born in Pisa, Spinesi started playing for Pisa Calcio. In November 1995 he signed for Inter Milan, however, he was not able to make appearance in the first team. Sold in January 1997 to Castel di Sangro, he played two unimpressive Serie B seasons for the small Serie B team. In June 1997 he joined A.S. Bari, where he made his Serie A debut and played six seasons. In February 2004, he was released for free by Bari following clashes with the board about his contract renewal.

In 2004–05, Spinesi played for newly promoted Serie B team Arezzo, where he scored 22 goals and won the league top scorer title. In 2005–06, Spinesi followed Siena coach Pasquale Marino in joining Catania, where he scored 23 goals and helped the team to promote to Serie A.

In 2006–07 Spinesi kept his excellent top flight record up by notching 17 goals and ensuring Catania remained in Serie A. During the 2007–08 season, however, Spinesi scored only seven goals in the league, but was still an influential part of the first team, as Catania again managed to avoid relegation. However, from 2008 onwards he failed to get back into the first team due to recurrent injuries, and he was released in June 2009. Spinesi successively announced his retirement from football, thus turning down an agreement he had previously found with Lega Pro Prima Divisione club Valle del Giovenco.
