= Luca Mezzano =

Italian football coach and former player (born 1977)

Personal information
- Full name: Luca Antonino Mezzano
- Date of birth: 1 August 1977 (age 49)
- Place of birth: Turin, Italy
- Height: 1.81 m (5 ft 11 in)
- Position: Centre back

Senior career*
Years	Team	Apps	(Gls)
1995–1997	Torino	43	(3)
1997–2001	Internazionale	4	(0)
1999	→ Perugia (loan)	8	(0)
1999	→ Verona (loan)	4	(0)
2000	→ Brescia (loan)	14	(0)
2000	→ Chievo (loan)	1	(0)
2001	→ Reggina (loan)	11	(0)
2001–2005	Torino	77	(4)
2005–2006	Bologna	36	(1)
2007–2009	Treviso	38	(0)
2007–2008	→ Triestina (loan)	10	(0)
2009–2010	Arezzo	5	(0)
Total		251	(8)

International career
1997–2000	Italy U21	19	(1)

Managerial career
- 2025–2026: ASD Chisola Calcio
- 2026–: Albese
- * Club domestic league appearances and goals

Luca Antonino Mezzano (born 1 August 1977) is an Italian football coach and former player who is currently as a head coach for Albese.

== Club career ==
Born in Turin, Mezzano started his career at hometown club Torino, and joined Internazionale in 1997. Despite being contracted for four seasons with the Nerazzurri, he only made ten appearances with the club across al competitions and was mostly sent on loan to other teams in Serie A and Serie B. He returned to Torino in 2001, spending four seasons with the club before playing with Bologna, Treviso and Triestina in Serie B. He retired in 2010, aged 33, after a spell at Arezzo in Italy's third division.

He played 71 Serie A games, making his debut against AS Roma, on 25 February 1996 and won UEFA Cup in 1997-98 when playing with Inter.

== International career ==
With the Italy youth team, he won the 2000 UEFA European Under-21 Championship and was a quarter-finalist at the 2000 Summer Olympics.
