= Martín Rivas (footballer, born 1977) =

Uruguayan footballer

Personal information
- Full name: Martín Sebastián Rivas Fernández
- Date of birth: 17 February 1977 (age 49)
- Place of birth: Montevideo, Uruguay
- Position: Defender

Senior career*
Years	Team	Apps	(Gls)
1995–1997	Danubio	50	(5)
1998–2002	Internazionale	1	(0)
1998–1999	→ Perugia (loan)	25	(0)
2000–2001	→ Málaga (loan)	6	(0)
2002	Peñarol	11	(0)
2003–2004	Deportivo Maldonado	26	(3)
2005–2006	River Plate Montevideo	19	(0)
2006–2007	Deportivo Maldonado	7	(0)

International career
1997	Uruguay U-20		
2000	Uruguay U-23		
1997	Uruguay	2	(0)
- * Club domestic league appearances and goals

Martín Sebastián Rivas Fernández (born 17 February 1977) is an Uruguayan former footballer who played as a defender.

== Biography ==
Born in Montevideo, the capital and largest city of Uruguay, he started to play for Danubio then in January 1998 signed by Inter, which he is dual Uruguayan-Spanish citizen, made him not occupy any non-EU quota. He signed a contract until 30 June 2002. Inter also signed countryman Álvaro Recoba earlier that season. On 17 March 1998, he appeared in the 1997–98 UEFA Cup quarterfinal return leg against FC Schalke 04. Inter won in extra time and eventually won the cup. He made his Serie A debut on 16 May 1998 against Empoli.

After a season on loan at Perugia he came back to Inter, but did not manage to make any appearances in 1999–2000 season, although sitting on the bench on several Serie A games.

The following season he was loaned to Málaga, prior to return to Uruguay where he ended his career in 2007, aged 30.

He played 2 caps with his national team and was in the squad of 1997 FIFA Confederations Cup.

== Honours ==
Inter Milan

- UEFA Cup: 1997–98
