= Benoît Cauet =

French footballer (born 1969)

Personal information
- Date of birth: 2 May 1969 (age 57)
- Place of birth: Châtellerault, France
- Height: 1.75 m (5 ft 9 in)
- Position: Midfielder

Senior career*
| Years | Team | Apps | (Gls) |
| 1987–1990 | Marseille | 33 | (1) |
| 1990–1994 | Caen | 144 | (8) |
| 1994–1996 | Nantes | 56 | (4) |
| 1996–1997 | Paris Saint-Germain | 35 | (4) |
| 1997–2001 | Inter Milan | 147 | (7) |
| 2001–2002 | Torino | 16 | (1) |
| 2002–2003 | Como | 31 | (0) |
| 2003–2004 | Bastia | 32 | (2) |
| 2004–2005 | CSKA Sofia | 15 | (0) |
| 2005–2006 | Sion | 15 | (1) |
| Total | | 524 | (28) |

Managerial career
- 2011–2016: Inter Milan (youth)
- 2016–2018: Inter Milan (scout)
- 2019–2020: Concarneau
- 2021: Châteauroux
- * Club domestic league appearances and goals

Benoît Cauet (born 2 May 1969) is a French professional football manager and former player, who played as a midfielder.

== Playing career ==
Cauet was born in Châtellerault. He won the Ligue 1 in 1989 and 1990 with Marseille and in 1995 with Nantes. He also won the Coupe de France in 1989 with Marseille and the UEFA Cup in 1998 with Inter Milan, as well as the Bulgarian A Professional Football Group in 2005 with CSKA Sofia. He appeared in the 1998 UEFA Cup Final as a substitute. In spite of his qualities as a player, he was never called up to the France national team at international level.

== Style of play ==
Cauet was a strong, dynamic, tenacious, and hard-working two-way midfielder, with a solid technique, who was known for his combative playing style and movement off the ball, as well as his ability to link-up with other midfielders and start attacking plays. Usually a defensive or central midfielder, he was regarded for his tactical intelligence and qualities as a ball-winner, although he was also capable of playing on the left flank, as well as in a more offensive midfield role.

== Coaching career ==
=== Inter Milan ===
Cauet worked as a coach in Inter Milan's youth system from 2011 to 2016. He would also become a scout there from 2016 to 2018.

=== Concarneau ===
From 2019 to 2020, Cauet worked as manager of Concarneau.

=== Châteauroux ===
Cauet was briefly Châteauroux manager from 1 January to 9 March 2021. With the club facing relegation, he replaced Nicolas Usaï in the role, but was sacked following the purchase of La Berichonne by Saudi prince Abdullah bin Musa'ad bin Abdulaziz Al Saud and his United World Group.

== Honours ==
Marseille

- Ligue 1: 1988–89, 1989–90
- Coupe de France: 1988–89

Nantes

- Ligue 1: 1994–95

Inter Milan

- UEFA Cup: 1997–98

CSKA Sofia

- Bulgarian A Group: 2004–05

Individual

- Pirata d'Oro (Internazionale Player Of The Year): 1999
