= Mauro Milanese =

Italian former footballer and manager (born 1971)

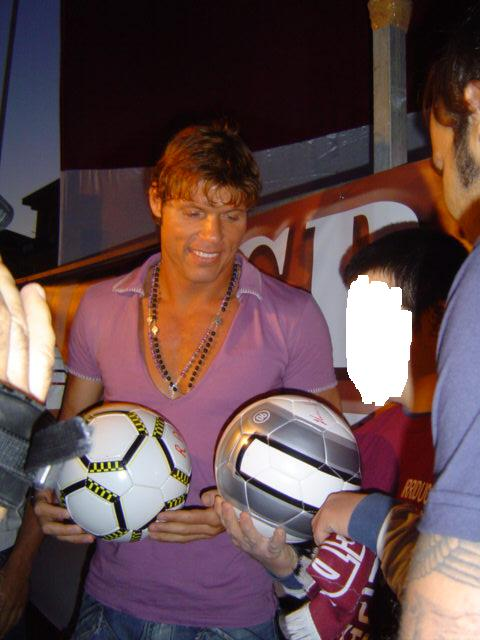

Personal information
- Date of birth: 17 September 1971 (age 55)
- Place of birth: Trieste, Italy
- Height: 1.86 m (6 ft 1 in)
- Position: Defender

Team information
- Current team: Triestina (CEO)

Youth career
- Triestina

Senior career*
Years	Team	Apps	(Gls)
1990–1994	Triestina	50	(3)
1990–1991	→ Monfalcone (loan)	33	(5)
1991–1992	→ Massese (loan)	22	(2)
1994–1995	Cremonese	27	(3)
1995–1996	Torino	31	(0)
1996–1997	Napoli	29	(1)
1997–1999	Parma	6	(0)
1998–1999	→ Inter Milan (loan)	16	(1)
1999–2003	Perugia	90	(2)
2003–2004	Ancona	27	(1)
2004–2005	Perugia	39	(4)
2005–2007	Queens Park Rangers	40	(0)
2007–2008	Salernitana	28	(0)
2008–2009	Varese	29	(2)
Total		467	(24)

Managerial career
- 2014: Leyton Orient
- * Club domestic league appearances and goals

Mauro Milanese (born 17 September 1971) is an Italian former professional football player and manager, who played as a defender. In 2014, he was manager of Leyton Orient.

He is the current CEO (amministratore unico) of hometown club Triestina.

== Playing career ==
Born in Trieste, Milanese started his senior career at Serie D side Monfalcone. He then played for Serie C1 side Massese, making 22 appearances before to join hometown club Triestina, where he played 50 Serie C1 matches in two seasons. In summer 1994 he was signed by Serie A side Cremonese, giving him the chance to make his top flight debut. He then played for Torino and Napoli, again at Serie A level. In summer 1997, he was signed by Parma, but in mid-season he was loaned to Inter Milan. He played his first match for Inter on 25 January 1998, as a substitute for Youri Djorkaeff in a 1–1 draw to Empoli; he also remained at Inter the following season.

In summer 1999, he joined Perugia in co-ownership deal. In summer 2003, he left for Serie A newcomers Ancona but suffered his second relegation (the first being while at Torino). He then re-joined Serie B side Perugia.

In August 2005, he joined Queens Park Rangers in one-year deal. Which he changed to play as a centre defender. He played 26 league matches but missed a month in September. His contract was later extended and released in May 2007. In August 2007 he was signed by Salernitana and won Serie C1 champion. He then left for Lega Pro Seconda Divisione side Varese Milanese planned to retire in July 2009 and aimed to qualify as a FIFA licensed football agent.

== Post-playing career ==
On 16 June 2011, he was announced as new director of football of Serie B club Varese, days after predecessor Sean Sogliano accepted an offer from Serie A club Palermo.

On 1 August 2014, Milanese was announced as the new sporting director of English League One club Leyton Orient, following the takeover by Francesco Becchetti. On 26 October 2014, Milanese replaced interim manager Kevin Nugent as manager of Leyton Orient, however he was sacked just six weeks later on 8 December.

In 2016, after having invested 100,000 EUR of his own money to save the club from bankruptcy, Milanese directly took part in the acquisition of Triestina as part of an Australian consortium led by Metricon owner Mario Biasin, being subsequently named the club's CEO. Under his tenure, Triestina, then in Serie D, were successfully readmitted to Serie C in 2017 to fill a vacancy.

== Honours ==
=== Player ===
Salernitana

- Lega Pro Prima Divisione: 2008

Varese

- Lega Pro Seconda Divisione: 2009
