= Zé Elias =

Brazilian footballer

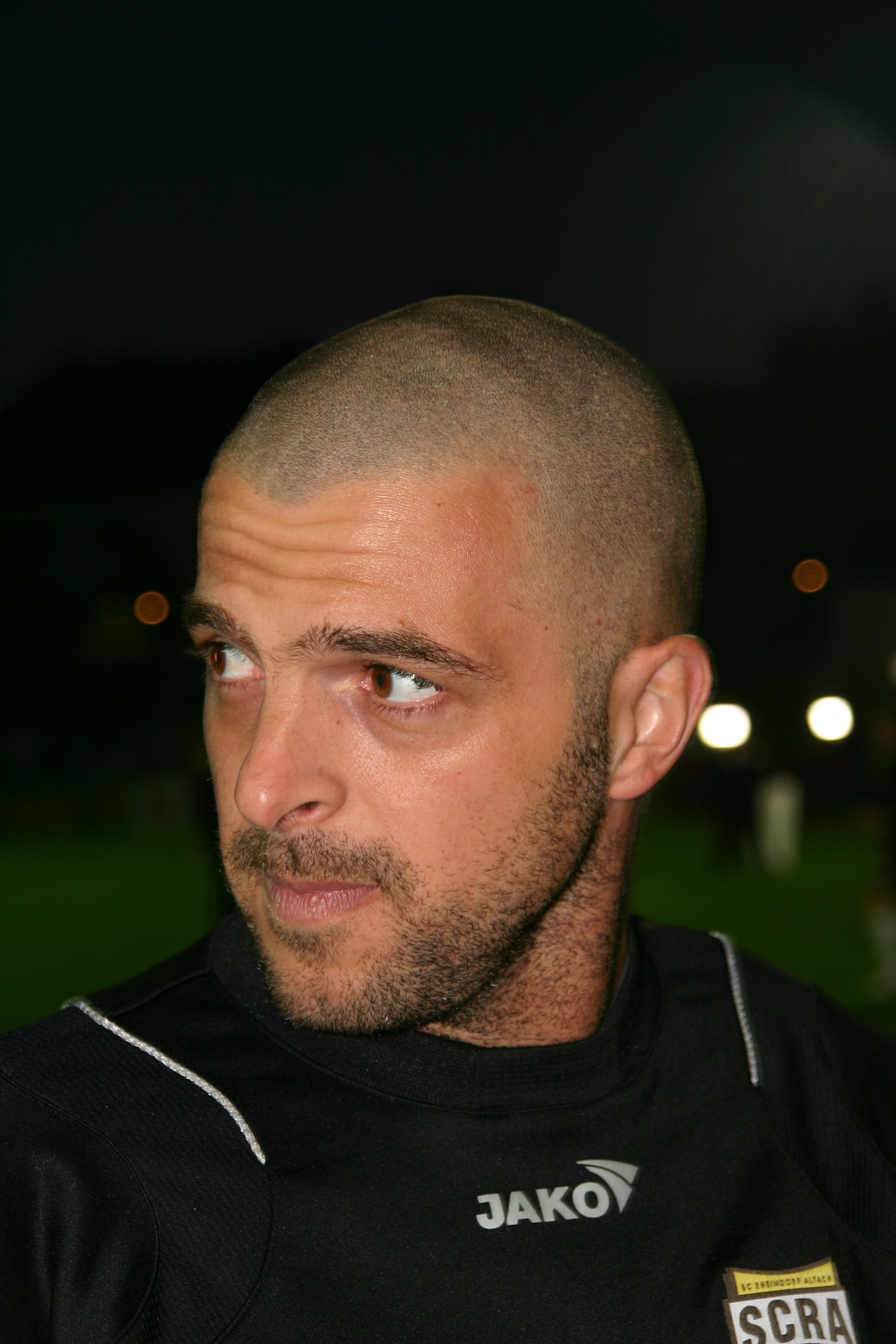
- Zé Elias in 2009

Personal information
- Full name: José Elias Moedim Júnior
- Date of birth: 25 September 1976 (age 50)
- Place of birth: Guarulhos, Brazil
- Height: 1.78 m (5 ft 10 in)
- Positions: Defensive midfielder; central midfielder

Youth career
- Corinthians

Senior career*
Years	Team	Apps	(Gls)
1993–1996	Corinthians	60	(2)
1996–1997	Bayer Leverkusen	23	(0)
1997–1999	Inter Milan	33	(0)
1999–2000	Bologna	19	(0)
2000–2003	Olympiacos	49	(2)
2003–2004	Genoa	19	(1)
2004–2005	Santos	25	(1)
2006	Metalurh Donetsk	0	(0)
2006	Guarani	1	(0)
2006–2007	Omonia	12	(1)
2008	Londrina		
2008–2009	Rheindorf Altach	16	(0)
Total		257	(7)

International career
1995–1999	Brazil	11	(0)
Medal record
Representing Brazil
Men's Football
Bronze medal – third place	1996 Atlanta	Team competition
- * Club domestic league appearances and goals

José Elias Moedim Júnior (born 25 September 1976), commonly known as Zé Elias, is a Brazilian football pundit and retired footballer. A defensive or central midfielder, he played for 12 teams in seven countries. He is a football analyst for ESPN Brasil.

== Club career ==
Born in Guarulhos, Zé Elias was one of the youngest players to ever appear for Sport Club Corinthians Paulista. He had already gained strong interest from PSV Eindhoven during his beginnings as a senior, which happened at the age of 17.

After becoming an undisputed starter at Corinthians, and first appearing for the Brazil national team at 19, Zé Elias went overseas, representing with moderate individual success Bayer 04 Leverkusen, Inter Milan, Bologna FC 1909, Olympiacos F.C. and Genoa CFC. He won three consecutive Super League Greece championships with the fourth club, but appeared sparingly in the process (a maximum of 18 league appearances).

After a return to Brazil with Santos FC, Zé Elias had short-lived stints with FC Metalurh Donetsk, Guarani FC, AC Omonia and Londrina Esporte Clube. He retired as a player in March 2008, and assumed a scouting role in Brazil for Inter Milan; however, in June, he signed a contract with SC Rheindorf Altach for the 2008–09 season, before announcing his retirement again.

== International career ==
Zé Elias was capped eleven times for Brazil. He received his first call-up on 29 March 1995, in a friendly with Honduras which ended 1–1.

Zé Elias represented the country at the 1996 Summer Olympics where he won bronze, and later at the 1996 CONCACAF Gold Cup in a runner-up finish, losing 0–2 in the final against Mexico.

== Personal life ==
Elias' younger brother, Rubinho, is also a professional footballer. A goalkeeper, he played most of his career in Italy.

== Honours ==
Corinthians

- Campeonato Paulista: 1995
- Copa do Brasil: 1995

Inter Milan

- UEFA Cup: 1997–98

Olympiacos

- Super League Greece: 2000–01, 2001–02, 2002–03
- Greek Football Cup runner-up: 2000–01, 2001–02

Santos

- Campeonato Brasileiro Série A: 2004

Brazil

- CONCACAF Gold Cup rner-up: 1996
- Summer Olympic Games bronze medal: 1996
