= Salvatore Fresi =

Italian footballer

Personal information
- Date of birth: 16 January 1973 (age 53)
- Place of birth: La Maddalena, Italy
- Height: 1.82 m (6 ft 0 in)
- Positions: Defender; midfielder

Youth career
- 1990–1991: Fiorentina
- 1991–1993: Foggia

Senior career*
Years	Team	Apps	(Gls)
1993–1995	Salernitana	62	(2)
1995–2001	Inter Milan	87	(1)
1998–1999	→ Salernitana (loan)	27	(3)
2000–2001	→ Napoli (loan)	23	(1)
2001–2002	Bologna	25	(8)
2002–2004	Juventus	9	(1)
2004	→ Perugia (loan)	11	(2)
2004	Catania	6	(0)
2005	Salernitana	6	(0)
2005–2006	Battipagliese		

International career
1994–1996	Italy U21	20	(1)
1997–1998	Italy	0	(0)
Medal record
Men's football
Representing Italy
UEFA European Under-21 Championship
Winner	1996 Spain
- * Club domestic league appearances and goals

Salvatore Fresi (born 16 January 1973) is an Italian former professional footballer who played as a centre-back or sweeper.

== Club career ==
Fresi was born in La Maddalena, Sardinia. His first professional championship was with Salernitana in 1993–94, with whom he obtained promotion to Serie B. At the conclusion of the season, he was selected for the Italian Under-21 side for the first time, and later became the captain of the side.

After another season in Serie B with Salernitana, in which his team narrowly missed out on promotion to Serie A, he was acquired by Inter Milan in 1995. Fresi played for the Milanese team until 2000, winning an UEFA Cup in 1998. Later that year, he was loaned back to Salernitana, and he was subsequently also loaned out to Napoli during the 2000–01 season. He joined Bologna in 2001, where he was able to play more frequently and recapture his previous form, and even scored 8 goals for the club; his performances gained him a place at the title-holders Juventus. Although he started the 2002–03 season strongly with the Turin side, scoring Juventus's third goal in a 3–0 win over Atalanta, after coming on as a substitute in the second half of the team's opening league match of the season, he went on to obtain few appearances in Serie A, making only 9 league appearances and a total of 16 in all competitions, although he was part of the team which won the scudetto during the 2002–03 Serie A season, and the 2002 Supercoppa Italiana. The following season, he only made one appearance for Juventus against Siena in the Coppa Italia, and he eventually left the club in 2004, going on loan to Perugia.

Later, he also played for Catania and Salernitana once again, where he remained despite the latter club's relegation to Serie C1 in 2005. The last team of his career was Battipagliese, for whom he played in the Eccellenza series, during the 2005–06 season.

== International career ==
Fresi was selected six times for the Italy national football team between 1995 and 1999, with his most recent call-up coming under manager Dino Zoff, but never played a single match for Italy at senior level. Fresi did make 17 international appearances with the Italy national under-21 football team between 1994 and 1996, scoring one goal, and frequently captained the squad; he was a member of the team that won the 1996 UEFA European Under-21 Championship under Cesare Maldini, and even scored in the final penalty shoot-out victory over Spain. Fresi also represented Italy at the 1996 Summer Olympic Games in Atlanta, making three appearances.

== Style of play ==
A stylish, elegant, and technically gifted defender, Fresi usually played as a man-marking centre-back or more often as a sweeper. His playing style, talent, character, leadership, composure in possession, and ability to create chances from the back with long balls that would meet the runs of the attackers initially led him to be compared to Franco Baresi in his youth. He was also known for his ability in the air as a defender, as well as his eye for goal, and was even capable of playing as a central midfielder, a position in which he was occasionally deployed due to his defensive limitations and ability in possession of the ball, although this was not his favoured position, as he often struggled in this role, and performed better in defence.

== Honours ==
Juventus

- Serie A: 2002–03
- Supercoppa Italiana: 2002

Inter Milan

- UEFA Cup: 1997–98

Italy U21

- UEFA European Under-21 Championship: 1996
