= Francesco Colonnese =

Italian footballer (born 1971)

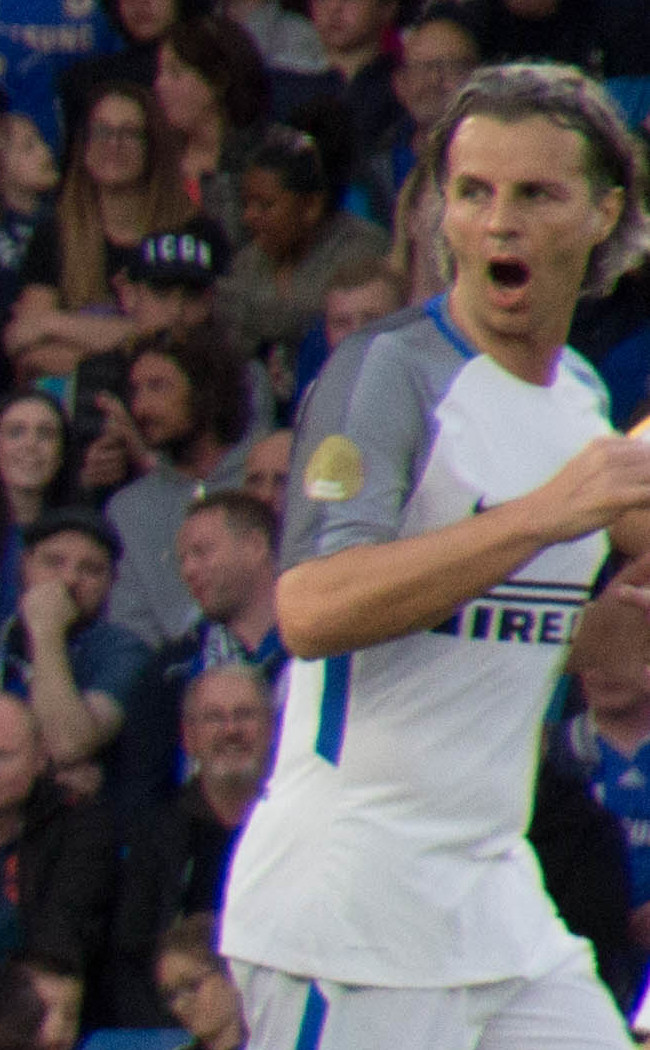
- Colonnese with Inter Legends team at Stamford Bridge in 2018

Personal information
- Date of birth: 10 August 1971 (age 55)
- Place of birth: Potenza, Italy
- Height: 1.81 m (5 ft 11 in)
- Position: Full-back

Senior career*
Years	Team	Apps	(Gls)
1989–1991	Potenza	34	(0)
1991–1992	Giarre	22	(0)
1992–1994	Cremonese	66	(0)
1994–1997	Roma	5	(0)
1995–1997	→ Napoli (loan)	47	(0)
1997–2000	Inter Milan	56	(2)
2000–2004	Lazio	12	(0)
2004–2006	Siena	34	(1)
Total		276	(3)
- * Club domestic league appearances and goals

Francesco Colonnese (born 10 August 1971) is an Italian former professional footballer who played as a full-back.

== Club career ==
Born in Potenza, Colonnese began his career in Potenza - where he played from 1989 to 1991 – before moving first to Giarre Football and then to Cremonese, where he made 66 appearances.

In the 1994–95 season, Colonnese was bought by AS Roma to strengthen the defensive department, but disappointed the expectations of manager Carlo Mazzone and played only 5 games.

In 1995, he signed for Napoli on loan – spending two years there – and played for Inter Milan during the 1997–98 season, with whom he won the UEFA Cup over SS Lazio in Paris in 1998.

From 2000 to 2004 he signed for Roman club Lazio – then the reigning Serie A champions. After four years at the Olimpico he left to finish his career with Siena (2004–2006).

== International career ==
Francesco Colonnese was capped for Italy national under-21 football team between 1993 and 1994. He finished in fourth place with the Italy U-23 Olympic side at the 1993 Mediterranean Games men's football tournament.

== Style of play ==
A physically strong and tenacious defender, Colonnese was known for his man-marking ability, and was capable of playing both as a right-sided full-back and as a central defender, or even as a sweeper. Throughout his career, he was given the nickname Ciccio Colonna, a reference to the Italian diminutive of his name, as well as his physical, hard-tackling playing style and tough marking of his opponents. He was also known for his ability to mark fast players.

== Honours ==
Inter Milan

- UEFA Cup: 1997–98

Lazio

- Supercoppa Italiana: 2000
- Coppa Italia: 2003–04
