= Fabio Galante =

Italian footballer

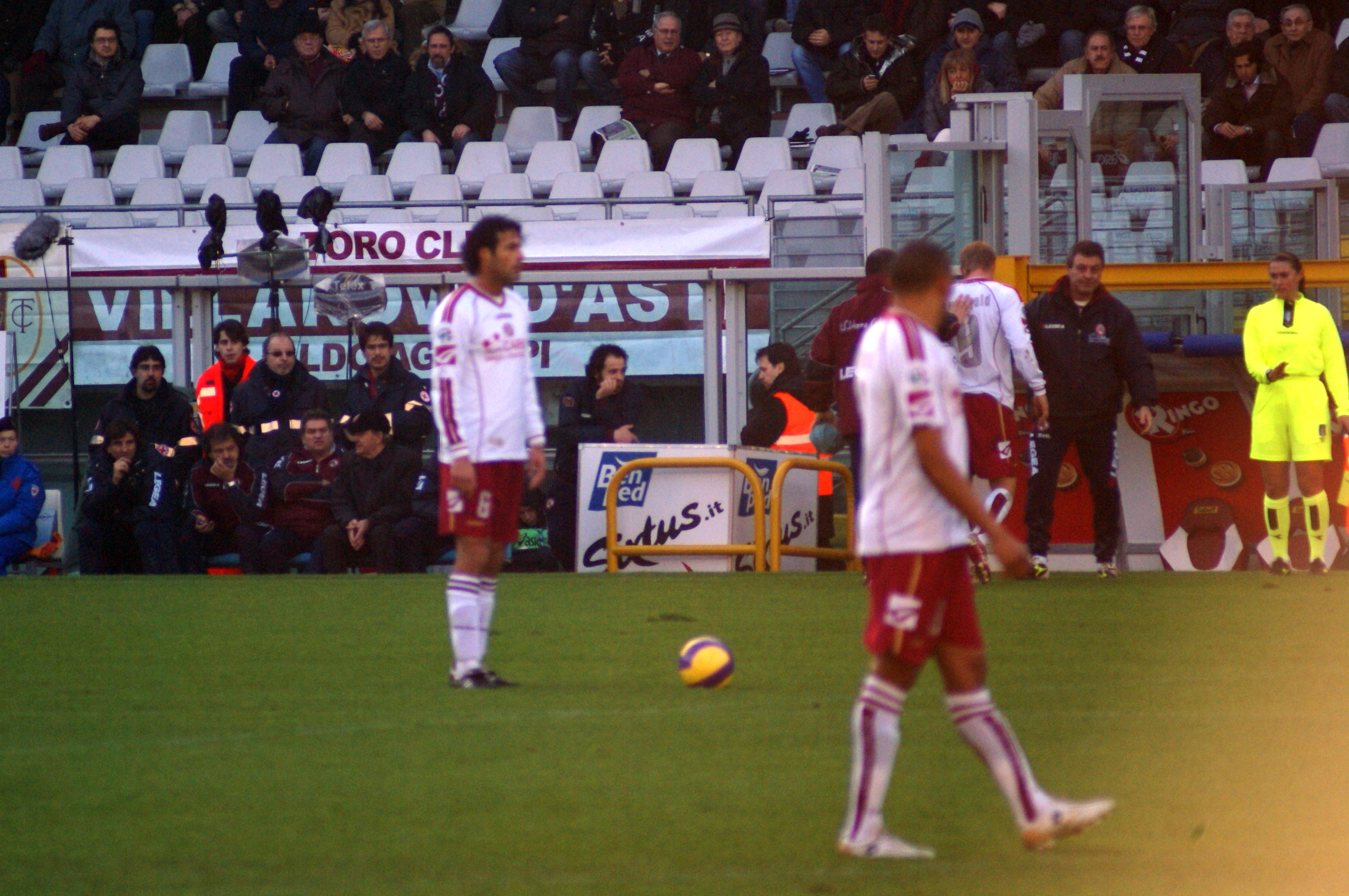
- Galante with Livorno in 2008

Personal information
- Date of birth: 20 November 1973 (age 52)
- Place of birth: Montecatini Terme, Italy
- Height: 1.85 m (6 ft 1 in)
- Position: Defender

Senior career*
Years	Team	Apps	(Gls)
1991–1993	Empoli	48	(3)
1994–1996	Genoa	85	(7)
1996–1999	Internazionale	55	(2)
1999–2004	Torino	124	(6)
2004–2010	Livorno	149	(5)
Total		461	(23)

International career
1991	Italy U18	10	(2)
1994–1996	Italy U21	18	(4)
1996	Italy Olympic	2	(0)
Medal record
Men's football
Representing Italy
UEFA European Under-21 Championship
Winner	1994 France
Winner	1994 France
- * Club domestic league appearances and goals

Fabio Galante (born 20 November 1973) is an Italian former professional footballer who played as a defender. He represented Italy at the 1996 Summer Olympics.

== Career ==
Galante was born in Montecatini Terme, Province of Pistoia. He started his professional career for Serie C1 side Empoli FC, then coached by Luciano Spalletti. He successively moved to Genoa CFC in 1994, where he won the 1996 Anglo-Italian Cup. He then switched to Internazionale in 1996. With Internazionale, Galante played three seasons, mostly as a backup player, winning an UEFA Cup title in 1998.

In 1999, he signed for Torino Calcio, initially on loan. Torino paid 5.1 billion lire to sign Galante permanently in June 2000, but at the same time selling half of the registration rights of Riccardo Fissore and Franco Semioli to Inter for 6 billion lire (Fissore was later bought back by Torino the following summer for 2 billion lire, meaning the club had acquired Fissore by paying Inter 1.1 billion lire in cash and half of Semioli). Galante spent four seasons with Torino in total, two of them in Serie A. He helped the club to gain Serie A promotion, winning the 2000–01 Serie B title; the following season he helped the club to win a spot in the 2002 UEFA Intertoto Cup.

In 2004, after having been relegated to the role of a backup defender in the Torino squad, he moved to Livorno, where he quickly became a key player and helped the team to maintain a Serie A place until 2008. He was subsequently released for free by the amaranto, but in November 2008 he agreed on a one-year contract with his former team, returning to Livorno for their 2008–09 Serie B campaign.

== After football ==
Galante received his coaching licence on 15 December 2017.

== Honours ==
Genoa

- Anglo-Italian Cup: 1995–96

Inter

- UEFA Cup: 1997–98

Torino

- Serie B: 2000–01

Italy U21

- UEFA European Under-21 Championship: 1994, 1996
