= Giorgio Frezzolini =

Italian footballer

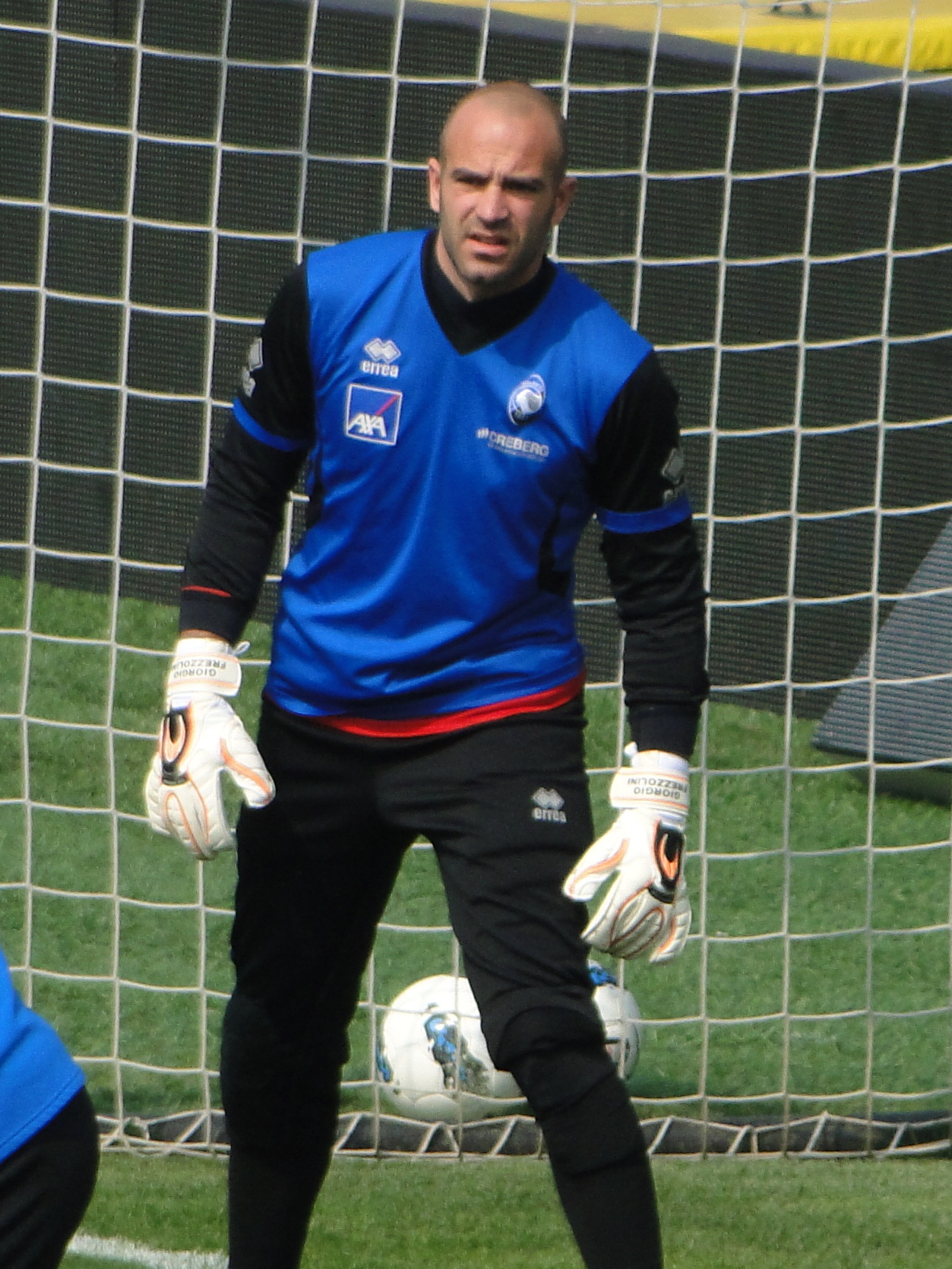

Personal information
- Full name: Giorgio Frezzolini
- Date of birth: 21 January 1976 (age 50)
- Place of birth: Rome, Italy
- Height: 1.86 m (6 ft 1 in)
- Position: Goalkeeper

Youth career
- 1990–1993: Lazio

Senior career*
Years	Team	Apps	(Gls)
1993–1995	Lazio	0	(0)
1993–1994	→ Cerveteri (loan)	3	(0)
1994–1995	→ Carpi (loan)	3	(0)
1995–2001	Internazionale	0	(0)
1996–1997	→ Trapani (loan)	32	(0)
1997	→ Fidelis Andria (loan)	11	(0)
1998	→ Udinese (loan)	2	(0)
1998	→ Cosenza (loan)	14	(0)
1999	→ A.C. Milan (loan)	0	(0)
2000–2001	→ Chievo (loan)	3	(0)
2001–2003	Lecce	4	(0)
2003	→ Venezia (loan)	3	(0)
2003–2004	Chievo	8	(0)
2004–2009	Modena	176	(0)
2009–2010	Ascoli	15	(0)
2010–2015	Atalanta	7	(0)
Total		281	(0)
- * Club domestic league appearances and goals

Giorgio Frezzolini (born 21 January 1976) is an Italian former footballer who played as a goalkeeper.

== Career ==
A Lazio youth system product, Frezzolini never played for the biancocelesti and was instead sent on loan to several minor league teams. In 1995, he was signed by Inter as a reserve choice, and then sent on loan to Serie C1 club Trapani in 1996, and Serie B side Fidelis Andria one year later. In November 1997, he was acquired by Udinese and managed to finally make his Serie A debut on 26 April 1998, in a league game against Roma. He was successively sent on loan again, this time to Cosenza, later in the summer of 1998, and spent the second half of the 1998–99 season on loan with A.C. Milan, who went on to win the Serie A title. After another spell on loan, this time with Chievo, in June 2001, he was sold to Lecce in a co-ownership deal, for 2,500 million lire (€1,291,142). (Note: as shown in Proventi e Oneri Straordinari Table and Immobilizzazioni finanziarie) In June 2002 Lecce acquired him outright for free. (Note: as shown in Proventi e Oneri Straordinari Table, another half of Frezzolini, which worth €1,291,142 in accounting, was sold for fee, made Inter registered a loss of the same amount. (€1,291,142))

From 2004 to 2009, he was first choice at Serie B club Modena, playing 176 games for the canarini. After a lacklustre season with Ascoli, Frezzolini joined Atalanta in 2010 as Andrea Consigli's backup.

He retired from professional football on 1 July 2015.
