= 1996–97 Inter Milan season =

Inter Milan
1996–97 season
- Owner: Massimo Moratti
- President: Massimo Moratti
- Manager: Roy Hodgson (until 22 May 1997); Luciano Castellini
- Stadium: Giuseppe Meazza
- Serie A: 3rd (In 1997–98 UEFA Cup)
- Coppa Italia: Semi-final
- UEFA Cup: Runners-up
- Top goalscorer: League: Youri Djorkaeff (14); All: Maurizio Ganz (20)
Home colours	Away colours	Third colours

During the 1996–97 Italian football season, Inter Milan competed in Serie A.

== Season summary ==
Inter finished third in the championship and reached the UEFA Cup final in Roy Hodgson's first (and only) full season in charge. The third place was Inter's best since the days of Lothar Matthäus and Andreas Brehme in the early 1990s and a starting point for further success in the coming years. The most significant happening for Inter in 1997 was the purchase of Brazilian striker Ronaldo for a record-breaking fee from Barcelona. The biggest disappointment was that Inter failed to beat Schalke 04 in the UEFA Cup final, and lost the second leg on penalties - at home. The loss meant Hodgson was fired, despite his successful season at the helm.

== Squad ==
Squad at end of season

Note: Flags indicate national team as defined under FIFA eligibility rules; some limited exceptions apply. Players may hold more than one non-FIFA nationality.

No.	Pos.	Nation	Player
1	GK	ITA	Gianluca Pagliuca
2	DF	ITA	Giuseppe Bergomi
3	DF	ITA	Alessandro Pistone
4	DF	ARG	Javier Zanetti
5	DF	ITA	Fabio Galante
6	FW	FRA	Youri Djorkaeff
7	DF	ITA	Salvatore Fresi
8	MF	ENG	Paul Ince
9	FW	CHI	Iván Zamorano
12	GK	ITA	Andrea Mazzantini
14	MF	NED	Aron Winter
15	MF	ITA	Sergio D'Autilia

No.	Pos.	Nation	Player
17	DF	ITA	Claudio Riboni
18	MF	ITA	Nicola Berti
19	DF	ITA	Massimo Paganin
20	DF	FRA	Jocelyn Angloma
21	MF	SUI	Ciriaco Sforza
22	GK	ITA	Armando Pantanelli
23	FW	ITA	Maurizio Ganz
24	MF	ITA	Davide Torretta
25	DF	ITA	Massimo Tarantino
27	FW	ITA	Marco Branca
29	FW	ITA	Arturo Di Napoli
31	DF	ITA	Matteo Ferrari

=== Transfers ===
In
Pos.	Name	from	Type
FW	Iván Zamorano	Real Madrid	
FW	Nwankwo Kanu	Ajax	
MF	Youri Djorkaeff	Paris Saint-Germain	
MF	Ciriaco Sforza	Bayern Munich	
MF	Aron Winter	Lazio	
DF	Jocelyn Angloma	Torino	
DF	Fabio Galante	Genoa	
DF	Massimo Tarantino	Napoli	
GK	Andrea Mazzantini	Venezia	
DF	Matteo Ferrari	S.P.A.L	
DF	Luca Mezzano	Torino	
DF	Paolo Tramezzani	Cesena	
MF	Igor Shalimov	Lugano	loan ended
GK	Paolo Orlandoni	Ancona	loan ended
FW	Massimo Marazzina	Foggia	re-purchased

Out
Pos.	Name	To	Type
DF	Roberto Carlos	Real Madrid	
MF	Igor Shalimov	Bologna	
MF	Davide Fontolan	Bologna	
DF	Giovanni Bia	Udinese	
DF	Felice Centofanti	Genoa	
DF	Mirko Conte	Piacenza	
DF	Mirko Taccola	Napoli	
DF	Paolo Tramezzani	Piacenza	
MF	Alessandro Bianchi	Cesena	
MF	Francesco Dell'Anno	Salernitana	
MF	Antonio Manicone	Perugia	
FW	Massimo Marazzina	Chievo Verona	
FW	Sebastián Rambert	Boca Juniors	loan
DF	Luca Mezzano	Torino	loan
GK	Giorgio Frezzolini	Trapani	loan
GK	Paolo Orlandoni	Foggia	loan
MF	Pierluigi Orlandini	Hellas Verona	loan
FW	Caio	Napoli	loan
FW	Marco Delvecchio	Roma	loan renewed
FW	Mohammed Kallon	Lugano	loan renewed
FW	Arturo Di Napoli	Napoli	co-ownership renewed

==== Autumn ====
In
R.	Nome	da	Modalità

Out
Pos.	Name	To	Type
GK	Marco Fortin	Torres	loan
MF	Andrea Seno	Bologna	
MF	Giammarco Frezza	Fidelis Andria	loan
FW	Benito Carbone	Sheffield Wednesday	

==== Winter ====
In
Pos.	Name	from	Type
FW	Arturo Di Napoli	Napoli	re-purchased

Out
Pos.	Name	To	Type
DF	Gianluca Festa	Middlesbrough	
FW	Gionatha Spinesi	Castel di Sangro	loan

==== Left club during season ====
Note: Flags indicate national team as defined under FIFA eligibility rules; some limited exceptions apply. Players may hold more than one non-FIFA nationality.

No.	Pos.	Nation	Player
11	FW	NGR	Nwankwo Kanu (de-registered)

== Competitions ==
=== Serie A ===
==== League table ====
Pos	Team	Pld	W	D	L	GF	GA	GD	Pts	Qualification or relegation
1	Juventus (C)	34	17	14	3	51	24	+27	65	Qualified to Champions League group stage
2	Parma	34	18	9	7	41	26	+15	63	Qualified to Champions League qualifying round
3	Internazionale	34	15	14	5	51	35	+16	59	Qualification to UEFA Cup
4	Lazio	34	15	10	9	54	37	+17	55	Qualification to UEFA Cup
5	Udinese	34	15	9	10	53	41	+12	54	Qualification to UEFA Cup

Source: Serie A, RSSSF.com, Soccerway
Rules for classification: 1) Points; 2) Head-to-head points; 3) Head-to-head goal difference; 4) Goal difference; 5) Goals scored; 6) Draw. (Note: Head-to-head record is used only after all the matches between the teams in question have been played).
(C) Champions

==== Results by round ====
Round	1	2	3	4	5	6	7	8	9	10	11	12	13	14	15	16	17	18	19	20	21	22	23	24	25	26	27	28	29	30	31	32	33	34
Ground	A	H	H	A	H	A	H	A	H	A	H	A	H	A	H	A	H	H	A	A	H	A	H	A	H	A	H	A	H	A	H	A	H	A
Result	W	W	D	D	W	L	W	W	D	D	D	D	L	D	W	W	L	D	D	D	W	W	D	L	W	D	W	W	L	W	W	D	W	D
Position	7	3	3	3	1	3	2	1	1	3	2	3	5	4	3	2	3	4	5	4	4	3	3	4	3	3	3	3	3	3	3	3	3	3

Source: Competitive matches
A = Away; H = Home; W = Win; D = Draw; L = Loss; P = Postponed; = Leader, 1997–98 UEFA Champions League Group stage; = 1997–98 UEFA Champions League Second Qualifying round; = 1997–98 UEFA Cup First round; = Relegation to 1997–98 Serie B

==== Matches ====
7 September 1996 1	Udinese	0–1	Inter	Udine
20:30 CEST		Report	Sforza 10'	Stadium: Friuli; Referee: Ceccarini

15 September 1996 2	Inter	1–0	Perugia	Milan
15:00 CEST	Zanetti 62'	Report		Stadium: Giuseppe Meazza; Referee: Pellegrino

21 September 1996 3	Inter	1–1	Lazio	Milan
15:00 CEST	Angloma 40'	Report	Signori 33'	Stadium: Giuseppe Meazza

29 September 1996 4	Atalanta	1–1	Inter	Bergamo
15:00 CEST	F. Inzaghi 86'	Report	Djorkaeff 44'	Stadium: Atleti Azzurri d'Italia

12 October 1996 5	Inter	2–0	Piacenza	Milan
15:00 CEST	Branca 45'; Djorkaeff 48'	Report		Stadium: Giuseppe Meazza

20 October 1996 6	Juventus	2–0	Inter	Turin
15:00 CEST	Jugović 40'; Zidane 62'	Report		Stadium: delle Alpi; Referee: Braschi

27 October 1996 7	Inter	3–1	Parma	Milan
15:00 CET	Zamorano 6', 54'; Zanetti 24'	Report	Crespo 1'	Stadium: Giuseppe Meazza

3 November 1996 8	Verona	0–1	Inter	Verona
15:00 CET		Report	Zanetti 85'	Stadium: Marcantonio Bentegodi; Referee: Messina

16 November 1996 9	Inter	2–2	Fiorentina	Milan
20:30 CET	Ganz 50'; Ince 83'	Report	Luís Oliveira 44', 64'	Stadium: Giuseppe Meazza

24 November 1996 10	Milan	1–1	Inter	Milan
20:30 CET	R. Baggio 3'	Report	Djorkaeff 13' (pen.)	Stadium: San Siro; Referee: Braschi

30 November 1996 11	Inter	2–2	Cagliari	Milan
15:00 CET	Ganz 8'; Djorkaeff 90' (pen.)	Report	Muzzi 44'; Silva 49'	Stadium: Giuseppe Meazza

8 December 1996 12	Vicenza	1–1	Inter	Vicenza
15:00 CET	Maini 19'	Report	Djorkaeff 63' (pen.)	Stadium: Romeo Menti; Referee: Cesari

15 December 1996 13	Inter	3–4	Sampdoria	Milan
15:00 CET	Branca 11', 46'; Berti 42'	Report	Montella 7', 57'; Franceschetti 85'; Mancini 90'	Stadium: Giuseppe Meazza

22 December 1996 14	Reggiana	1–1	Inter	Reggio Emilia
15:00 CET	Pacheco 42'	Report	Djorkaeff 64'	Stadium: Giglio

5 January 1997 15	Inter	3–1	Roma	Milan
15:00 CET	Ganz 11'; Djorkaeff 39'; Fresi 69'	Report	Delvecchio 48'	Stadium: Giuseppe Meazza

12 January 1997 16	Napoli	1–2	Inter	Naples
15:00 CET	Caccia 90'	Report	Branca 43'; Djorkaeff 88'	Stadium: San Paolo; Referee: Bazzoli

19 January 1997 17	Inter	0–2	Bologna	Milan
15:00 CET		Report	Marocchi 38'; Shalimov 90'	Stadium: Giuseppe Meazza

26 January 1997 18	Inter	1–1	Udinese	Milan
15:00 CET	Djorkaeff 63' (pen.)	Report	Poggi 12'	Stadium: Giuseppe Meazza

2 February 1997 19	Perugia	0–0	Inter	Perugia
14:30 CET		Report		Stadium: Renato Curi; Referee: Collina

16 February 1997 20	Lazio	2–2	Inter	Rome
15:00 CET	Fuser 24'; Signori 72'	Report	Zamorano 60'; Djorkaeff 62'	Stadium: Olimpico; Referee: Ceccarini

23 February 1997 21	Inter	2–0	Atalanta	Milan
15:00 CET	Djorkaeff 68'; Zamorano 90'	Report		Stadium: Giuseppe Meazza

1 March 1997 22	Piacenza	0–3	Inter	Piacenza
15:00 CET		Report	Ince 39', 45'; Ganz 54'	Stadium: Leonardo Garilli; Referee: Trentalange

9 March 1997 23	Inter	0–0	Juventus	Milan
20:30 CET		Report		Stadium: Giuseppe Meazza

15 March 1997 24	Parma	1–0	Inter	Parma
15:00 CET	Chiesa 22'	Report		Stadium: Ennio Tardini; Referee: Bazzoli

23 March 1997 25	Inter	2–1	Verona	Milan
15:00 CET	Ganz 31'; Branca 57'	Report	Maniero 33'	Stadium: Giuseppe Meazza

5 April 1997 26	Fiorentina	0–0	Inter	Florence
15:00 CEST		Report		Stadium: Artemio Franchi; Referee: Cesari

13 April 1997 27	Inter	3–1	Milan	Milan
20:30 CEST	Djorkaeff 32' (pen.); Zamorano 43'; Ganz 57'	Report	R. Baggio 88'	Stadium: Giuseppe Meazza

19 April 1997 28	Cagliari	1–2	Inter	Cagliari
15:00 CEST	Tovalieri 80'	Report	Zamorano 42'; Ince 50'	Stadium: Sant'Elia; Referee: Pellegrino

3 May 1997 29	Inter	0–1	Vicenza	Milan
15:00 CEST		Report	Iannuzzi 23'	Stadium: Giuseppe Meazza

11 May 1997 30	Sampdoria	1–2	Inter	Genoa
15:00 CET	Verón 14'	Report	Ganz 45', 76'	Stadium: Luigi Ferraris; Referee: Pairetto

15 May 1997 31	Inter	3–1	Reggiana	Milan
15:00 CEST	Ince 42', 90'; Ganz 60'	Report	Galli 66'	Stadium: Giuseppe Meazza

18 May 1997 32	Roma	1–1	Inter	Rome
15:00 CEST	Statuto 55'	Report	Djorkaeff 83'	Stadium: Olimpico

25 May 1997 33	Inter	3–2	Napoli	Milan
15:00 CEST	Ince 50'; Zamorano 66'; Djorkaeff 82'	Report	Ince 33' (o.g.); Caccia 90'	Stadium: Giuseppe Meazza

1 June 1997 34	Bologna	2–2	Inter	Bologna
15:00 CEST	Shalimov 5'; Paramatti 75'	Report	Ganz 51', 65'	Stadium: Renato Dall'Ara

=== Coppa Italia ===
==== Second round ====
28 August 1996	Ravenna	0–1	Inter	Ravenna
20:45 CET			28' Winter	Stadium: Bruno Benelli; Referee: Braschi

==== Eightfinals ====
24 October 1996	Cagliari	2–2	Inter	Cagliari
20:45 CET	Pancaro 85'; Silva 87'		57' Ince; 68' Zamorano	Stadium: Sant'Elia; Referee: Boggi

6 November 1996 replay	Inter	2–1	Cagliari	Milan
20:45 CET	Paganin 35'; Zamorano 42'		81' (o.g.) Angloma	Stadium: Stadio Giuseppe Meazza; Referee: Farina

==== Quarterfinals ====
13 November 1996	Juventus	0–3	Inter	Turin
20:45 CET			33' Zamorano; 77' Ince; 89' Djorkaeff	Stadium: delle Alpi; Referee: Cesari

18 December 1996	Inter	1–1	Juventus	Milan
20:45 CET	Ganz 50'		46' Amoruso	Stadium: Giuseppe Meazza; Referee: Nicchi

==== Semifinals ====
29 January 1997	Inter	1–1	Napoli	Milan
20:45 CET	Zamorano 5'		11' Cruz	Stadium: Giuseppe Meazza; Referee: Treossi

26 February 1997	Napoli	1–1 (5–4 p)	Inter	Naples
20:45 CET	Beto 73'		11' Zanetti	Stadium: San Paolo; Referee: Pairetto
	Penalties
	Milanese (penalty scored); Caccia (penalty scored); Caio (penalty scored); Turrini (penalty scored); Boghossian (penalty scored)		(penalty scored) Zamorano; (penalty scored) Djorkaeff; (penalty missed) Paganin; (penalty scored) Pistone

=== UEFA Cup ===
==== First round ====
10 September 1996	Guingamp (France)	0–3	(Italy) Inter	Guingamp
20:45 (CET)		Report	24' Ganz; 71' (pen.) Djorkaeff; 85' Sforza	Stadium: municipal de Roudourou; Attendance: 6,981; Referee: (Spain) Vega

24 September 1996	Inter (Italy)	1–1	(France) Guingamp	Milan
20:45 (CET)	Branca 7'	Report	75' Wreh	Stadium: Giuseppe Meazza; Attendance: 7,000; Referee: (Luxembourg) Hamer

==== Second round ====
15 October 1996	Inter (Italy)	1–0	(Austria) Grazer AK	Milan
20:45 (CET)	Angloma 80'	Report		Stadium: Giuseppe Meazza; Attendance: 8,145; Referee: (Netherlands) Jol

29 October 1996	Grazer AK (Austria)	1–0 (3–5 p)	(Italy) Inter	Kapfenberg
20:45 (CET)	Sabitzer 36' (pen.)	Report		Stadium: Franz Fekete Stadion; Attendance: 10,500; Referee: (France) Veissière
	Penalties
	Anicic (penalty scored); Dampfhofer (penalty missed); Rajkovic (penalty scored); Muzek (penalty scored)		(penalty scored) Zamorano; (penalty scored) Djorkaeff; (penalty scored) Berti; (penalty scored) Pistone; (penalty scored) Fresi

==== Eightfinals ====
19 November 1996	Inter (Italy)	5–1	(Portugal) Boavista	Milan
20:45 (CET)	Sforza 6', 58'; Angloma 14'; Ganz 23', 66'	Report	62' Hasselbaink	Stadium: Giuseppe Meazza; Attendance: 20,018; Referee: (England) Durkin

3 December 1996	Boavista (Portugal)	0–2	(Italy) Inter	Porto
20:45 (CET)		Report	12' (pen.) Djorkaeff; 66' Ince	Stadium: do Bessa Seculo XXI; Attendance: 15,000; Referee: (Germany) Merk

==== Quarterfinals ====
4 March 1997	Anderlecht (Belgium)	1–1	(Italy) Inter	Anderlecht, Brussels
20:45 (CET)	Versavel 27'	Report	75' Ganz	Stadium: Constant Vanden Stock Stadium; Attendance: 27,000; Referee: (Hungary) Puhl

18 March 1997	Inter (Italy)	2–1	(Belgium) Anderlecht	Milan
20:45 (CET)	Ganz 12', 60'	Report	33' Preko	Stadium: Giuseppe Meazza; Attendance: 43,221; Referee: (Germany) Heynemann

==== Semifinals ====
8 April 1997	Inter (Italy)	3–1	(France) Monaco	Milan
20:45 (CET)	Ganz 17', 30'; Zamorano 39'	Report	71' Ikpeba	Stadium: Giuseppe Meazza; Attendance: 49,078; Referee: (Belgium) Piraux

22 April 1997	Monaco (France)	1–0	(Italy) Inter	Monaco
20:45 (CET)	Ikpeba 69'	Report		Stadium: Stade Louis II; Attendance: 20,000; Referee: (Netherlands) Van der Ende

==== Final ====
7 May 1997	Schalke 04 (Germany)	1–0	(Italy) Inter	Gelsenkirchen
20:45 (CET)	Wilmots 69'	Report		Stadium: Parkstadion; Attendance: 56,824; Referee: (France) Batta

21 May 1997	Inter (Italy)	1–0 (1–4 p)	(Germany) Schalke 04	Milan
20:45 (CET)	Zamorano 84'	Report		Stadium: Giuseppe Meazza; Attendance: 81,675; Referee: (Spain) García-Aranda
	Penalties
	Zamorano (penalty missed); Djorkaeff (penalty scored); Winter (penalty missed)		(penalty scored) Anderbrügge; (penalty scored) Thon; (penalty scored) Max; (penalty scored) Wilmots

== Statistics ==
=== Players statistics ===
No.	Pos	Nat	Player	Total		Serie A		Coppa		UEFA	
No.	Pos	Nat	Player	Apps	Goals	Apps	Goals	Apps	Goals	Apps	Goals
1	GK	(Italy) ITA	Pagliuca	53	-49	34	−35	7	−6	12	−8
20	DF	(France) FRA	Angloma	45	3	28+2	1	6	0	7+2	2
7	DF	(Italy) ITA	Fresi	44	1	28+1	1	5	0	10	0
19	DF	(Italy) ITA	Paganin	49	1	31+1	0	6	1	11	0
3	DF	(Italy) ITA	Pistone	39	0	23+3	0	4	0	7+2	0
4	MF	(Argentina) ARG	Zanetti J	50	4	32+1	3	5	1	12	0
8	MF	(England) ENG	Ince	38	10	24	7	4	2	10	1
21	MF	(Switzerland) SUI	Sforza	40	4	24+2	1	3	0	9+2	3
6	MF	(France) FRA	Djorkaeff	49	17	31+2	14	6	1	8+2	2
9	FW	(Chile) CHI	Zamorano	48	14	26+5	7	7	5	10	2
23	FW	(Italy) ITA	Ganz	48	20	20+10	11	7	1	8+3	8
12	GK	(Italy) ITA	Mazzantini	1	0	0+1	0	0	0	0	0
5	DF	(Italy) ITA	Galante	28	0	18	0	6	0	3+1	0
27	FW	(Italy) ITA	Branca	31	6	16+5	5	4	0	3+3	1
2	DF	(Italy) ITA	Bergomi	36	0	16+3	0	7	0	9+1	0
4	MF	(Netherlands) NED	Winter	42	1	14+10	0	7	1	7+4	0
18	MF	(Italy) ITA	Berti	37	1	5+18	1	7	0	3+4	0
13	DF	(Italy) ITA	Festa	11	0	4+1	0	2	0	3+1	0
30	FW	(Italy) ITA	Di Napoli	6	0	0+6	0	0	0	0	0
10	FW	(Italy) ITA	Carbone	4	0	0+1	0	1	0	1+1	0
15	MF	(Italy) ITA	D'Autilia	1	0	0	0	1	0	0	0
	MF	(Italy) ITA	Seno	1	0	0	0	1	0	0	0
	FW	(Nigeria) NGR	Kanu	0	0	0	0	0	0	0	0
		(Italy) ITA	Pantanelli	0	0	0	0	0	0	0	0
	MF	(Italy) ITA	Spinesi	0	0	0	0	0	0	0	0
	DF	(Italy) ITA	Tarantino	0	0	0	0	0	0	0	0

- Source: http://calcio-seriea.net/presenze/1996/1123/

== Sources ==
- RSSSF - Italy 1996/97
