= 1996–97 FC Schalke 04 season =

FC Schalke 04
1996–97 season
- Manager: Jörg Berger (until 5 October); Huub Stevens (from 5 October)
- Bundesliga: 12th
- DFB-Pokal: Second round
- UEFA Cup: Winners
- Top goalscorer: League: Martin Max (12); All: Martin Max (16)
Home colours	Away colours

The 1996–97 season was the 93rd season in the history of FC Schalke 04 and the club's sixth consecutive season in the top flight of German football.

== Season summary ==
Schalke claimed the UEFA Cup, defeating Roy Hodgson's Inter Milan 2–1 on aggregate in the final. The European triumph allowed Schalke to compete in the UEFA Cup the next season despite a 12th-placed finish - a disappointing finish after finishing third the previous season.

== Squad ==
Squad at end of season

Note: Flags indicate national team as defined under FIFA eligibility rules; some limited exceptions apply. Players may hold more than one non-FIFA nationality.

No.	Pos.	Nation	Player
1	GK	GER	Jens Lehmann
2	DF	GER	Thomas Linke
3	MF	CZE	Radoslav Látal
4	DF	GER	Yves Eigenrauch
5	DF	USA	Thomas Dooley
6	MF	GER	Andreas Müller
8	MF	GER	Ingo Anderbrügge
9	FW	NED	Youri Mulder
10	MF	GER	Olaf Thon
11	FW	GER	Martin Max
12	DF	NED	Marco van Hoogdalem
14	FW	USA	David Wagner

No.	Pos.	Nation	Player
16	MF	GER	Oliver Held
18	DF	GER	Thomas Kläsener
19	MF	GER	Mike Büskens
20	MF	CZE	Jiří Němec
21	DF	GER	Marco Kurz
22	GK	GER	Mathias Schober
23	MF	GER	Arnold Dybek
24	MF	BEL	Marc Wilmots
26	DF	NED	Johan de Kock
31	FW	ANG	Miguel Pereira
37	FW	GER	Mike Möllensiep

=== Left club during season ===
Note: Flags indicate national team as defined under FIFA eligibility rules; some limited exceptions apply. Players may hold more than one non-FIFA nationality.

No.	Pos.	Nation	Player
7	MF	GER	Uwe Weidemann (to Hertha Berlin)
12	MF	GER	Uwe Scherr (to Köln)
13	MF	GER	Waldemar Ksienzyk (to Waldhof Mannheim)

No.	Pos.	Nation	Player
15	DF	GER	Michael Prus (to SV Meppen)
17	DF	GER	Frank Schön (to Waldhof Mannheim)

== Competitions ==
=== Bundesliga ===
==== League table ====
Pos	Team	Pld	W	D	L	GF	GA	GD	Pts	Qualification or relegation
10	1. FC Köln	34	13	5	16	62	62	0	44	Qualification to Intertoto Cup group stage
11	Borussia Mönchengladbach	34	12	7	15	46	48	−2	43	
12	Schalke 04	34	11	10	13	35	40	−5	43	Qualification to UEFA Cup first round (Note: Borussia Dortmund and Schalke 04 won their respective European competitions in this season, so they qualified as title holders. As a consequence, the original UEFA Cup places of Dortmund and Stuttgart, who qualified for the UEFA Cup Winners' Cup as domestic cup winners, were awarded to Karlsruhe and 1860 Munich; the Intertoto Cup berths of Karlsruhe and 1860 were handed to Köln and Hamburg, as Mönchengladbach did not apply for this competition.)
13	Hamburger SV	34	10	11	13	46	60	−14	41	Qualification to Intertoto Cup group stage
14	Arminia Bielefeld	34	11	7	16	46	54	−8	40	

Source: www.dfb.de
Rules for classification: 1) points; 2) goal difference; 3) number of goals scored.

=== DFB-Pokal ===
10 August 1996 First round	SSV Ulm 1846	0–2	Schalke 04	Ulm
		Report (in German)	Max 4'; Linke 18'	Stadium: Donaustadion; Attendance: 9,000; Referee: Stark (Landshut)

1 October 1996 Second round	Schalke 04	2–3	VfL Bochum	Gelsenkirchen
	Wilmots 35'; Held 47'	Report (in German)	Guðjónsson 1', 30'; Bałuszyński 60'	Stadium: Parkstadion; Attendance: 20,200; Referee: Michael Malbranc (Hamburg)

=== UEFA Cup ===
10 September 1996 First round 1st leg	Schalke 04 (Germany)	3–0	(Netherlands) Roda	Parkstadion, Gelsenkirchen
	Wilmots 8', 73'; Mulder 14'	Report		Attendance: 50,100

24 September 1996 First round 2nd leg	Roda (Netherlands)	2–2 (2–5 agg.)	(Germany) Schalke 04	Gemeentelijk Sportpark Kaalheide, Kerkrade
	Vurens 26'; Dooley 76' (o.g.)	Report	Wagner 16'; Wilmots 73'	Attendance: 8,000

15 October 1996 Second round 1st leg	Schalke 04 (Germany)	1–0	(Turkey) Trabzonspor	Parkstadion, Gelsenkirchen
	Max 76'	Report		Attendance: 51,100

29 October 1996 Second round 2nd leg	Trabzonspor (Turkey)	3–3 (3–4 agg.)	(Germany) Schalke 04	Hüseyin Avni Aker Stadium, Trabzon
	Arveladze 55'; Mandıralı 66', 71'	Report	de Kock 33', 36'; Max 73'	Attendance: 23,000

19 November 1996 Third round 1st leg	Club Brugge (Belgium)	2–1	(Germany) Schalke 04	Jan Breydel Stadium, Bruges
	Stanić 35'; Špehar 59'	Report	Büskens 51'	Attendance: 14,000

3 December 1996 Third round 2nd leg	Schalke 04 (Germany)	2–0 (3–2 agg.)	(Belgium) Club Brugge	Parkstadion, Gelsenkirchen
	Max 9'; Mulder 90'	Report		Attendance: 46,300

4 March 1997 Quarter-final 1st leg	Schalke 04 (Germany)	2–0	(Spain) Valencia	Parkstadion, Gelsenkirchen
20:45	Linke 44'; Wilmots 82'	Report		Attendance: 56,800; Referee: Ryszard Wójcik (Poland)

18 March 1997 Quarter-final 2nd leg	Valencia (Spain)	1–1 (1–3 agg.)	(Germany) Schalke 04	Mestalla, Valencia
22:00	Poyatos 45'	Report	Mulder 19'	Attendance: 46,000; Referee: Rune Pedersen (Norway)

8 April 1997 Semi-final 1st leg	Tenerife (Spain)	1–0	(Germany) Schalke 04	Heliodoro Rodríguez López, Santa Cruz de Tenerife
21:00	Felipe 6' (pen.)	Report		Attendance: 21,000; Referee: David Elleray (England)

22 April 1997 Semi-final 2nd leg	Schalke 04 (Germany)	2–0 (a.e.t.) (2–1 agg.)	(Spain) Tenerife	Parkstadion, Gelsenkirchen
20:45	Linke 68'; Wilmots 107'	Report		Attendance: 56,800; Referee: Sándor Puhl (Hungary)

==== Final ====
7 May 1997 1st leg	Schalke 04 (Germany)	1–0	(Italy) Inter Milan	Parkstadion, Gelsenkirchen
20:45 CEST	Wilmots 70'	Report		Attendance: 56,824; Referee: Marc Batta (France)

21 May 1997 2nd leg	Inter Milan (Italy)	1–0 (a.e.t.) (1–4 p)	(Germany) Schalke 04	Stadio Giuseppe Meazza, Milan
20:45 CEST	Zamorano 84'	Report		Attendance: 81,675; Referee: José García-Aranda (Spain)
	Penalties
	Zamorano (penalty missed); Djorkaeff (penalty scored); Winter (penalty missed)		(penalty scored) Anderbrügge; (penalty scored) Thon; (penalty scored) Max; (penalty scored) Wilmots

== Squad statistics ==
No.	Pos	Nat	Player	Total		Bundesliga		DFB-Pokal		UEFA Cup	
No.	Pos	Nat	Player	Apps	Goals	Apps	Goals	Apps	Goals	Apps	Goals
1	GK	(Germany) GER	Jens Lehmann	48	0	34	0	2	0	12	0
22	GK	(Germany) GER	Mathias Schober	1	0	1	0	0	0	0	0
2	DF	(Germany) GER	Thomas Linke	43	4	30	1	2	1	11	2
4	DF	(Germany) GER	Yves Eigenrauch	36	1	26	1	2	0	8	0
5	DF	(United States) USA	Thomas Dooley	15	2	8	2	0	0	7	0
10	DF	(Germany) GER	Olaf Thon	46	2	33	2	1	0	12	0
12	DF	(Netherlands) NED	Marco van Hoogdalem	17	0	17	0	0	0	0	0
15	DF	(Germany) GER	Michael Prus (Note: Player transferred out during the season)	1	0	1	0	0	0	0	0
17	DF	(Germany) GER	Frank Schön	4	0	3	0	1	0	0	0
21	DF	(Germany) GER	Marco Kurz	21	0	17	0	1	0	3	0
25	DF	(Netherlands) NED	Johan de Kock	37	3	28	1	1	0	8	2
3	MF	(Czech Republic) CZE	Radoslav Látal	43	2	29	2	2	0	12	0
6	MF	(Germany) GER	Andreas Müller	41	0	28	0	2	0	11	0
7	MF	(Germany) GER	Uwe Weidemann	10	0	6	0	1	0	3	0
8	MF	(Germany) GER	Ingo Anderbrügge	38	4	28	3	1	0	9	1
12	MF	(Germany) GER	Uwe Scherr	1	0	1	0	0	0	0	0
16	MF	(Germany) GER	Oliver Held	19	2	14	1	2	1	3	0
19	MF	(Germany) GER	Mike Büskens	41	2	29	1	2	0	10	1
20	MF	(Czech Republic) CZE	Jiří Němec	44	0	30	0	2	0	12	0
23	MF	(Germany) GER	Arnold Dybek	1	0	1	0	0	0	0	0
24	MF	(Belgium) BEL	Marc Wilmots	42	12	29	6	2	1	11	5
9	FW	(Netherlands) NED	Youri Mulder	27	6	19	3	1	0	7	3
11	FW	(Germany) GER	Martin Max	42	16	30	12	2	1	10	3
14	FW	(United States) USA	David Wagner	19	1	13	0	1	0	5	1
31	FW	(Angola) ANG	Miguel Pereira	1	0	1	0	0	0	0	0
36	FW	(Germany) GER	Ralf Regenbogen	1	0	1	0	0	0	0	0
37	FW	(Germany) GER	Mike Möllensiep	2	0	2	0	0	0	0	0
