= 1997 UEFA Cup final =

- Second leg match programme cover
- Event: 1996–97 UEFA Cup
Schalke 04	Inter Milan
(Germany)	(Italy)
1	1
- on aggregate Schalke 04 won 4–1 on penalties

First leg
Schalke 04	Inter Milan
1	0
- Date: 7 May 1997
- Venue: Parkstadion, Gelsenkirchen
- Referee: Marc Batta (France)
- Attendance: 56,824

Second leg
Inter Milan	Schalke 04
1	0
- After golden goal extra time
- Date: 21 May 1997
- Venue: Stadio Giuseppe Meazza, Milan
- Referee: José María García-Aranda (Spain)
- Attendance: 81,675

The 1997 UEFA Cup final was a two-legged football match contested between Schalke 04 of Germany and Inter Milan of Italy. The tie was a tight affair, with each leg being won 1–0 by the home-team. After 210 minutes of football, the tie was eventually settled on penalties, with Schalke winning 4–1 at the Stadio Giuseppe Meazza. It was to be the last UEFA Cup final to be played over two legs, future finals being one-off games at a neutral ground.

== Route to the final ==
(Germany) Schalke 04				Round	(Italy) Inter Milan			
UEFA Cup					UEFA Cup			
Opponent	Agg.	1st leg	2nd leg		Opponent	Agg.	1st leg	2nd leg
(Netherlands) Roda	5–2	3–0 (H)	2–2 (A)	First round	(France) Guingamp	4–1	3–0 (A)	1–1 (H)
(Turkey) Trabzonspor	4–3	1–0 (H)	3–3 (A)	Second round	(Austria) GAK	1–1 (p)	1–0 (H)	0–1 (A)
(Belgium) Club Brugge	3–2	1–2 (A)	2–0 (H)	Third round	(Portugal) Boavista	7–1	5–1 (H)	2–0 (A)
(Spain) Valencia	3–1	2–0 (H)	1–1 (A)	Quarter-finals	(Belgium) Anderlecht	3–2	1–1 (A)	2–1 (H)
(Spain) Tenerife	2–1	0–1 (A)	2–0 (aet) (H)	Semi-finals	(France) Monaco	3–2	3–1 (H)	0–1 (A)

== Match ==
=== Details ===
==== First leg ====
7 May 1997
20:45 CEST

Schalke 04 (Germany)	1–0	(Italy) Inter Milan
Wilmots 69'	Report

Parkstadion, Gelsenkirchen
Attendance: 56,824
Referee: Marc Batta (France)

Schalke 04	Internazionale

GK	1	(Germany) Jens Lehmann
SW	10	(Germany) Olaf Thon (c)
CB	25	(Netherlands) Johan de Kock
CB	2	(Germany) Thomas Linke
RWB	4	(Germany) Yves Eigenrauch
LWB	19	(Germany) Mike Büskens	(substituted off) 66'
CM	20	(Czech Republic) Jiří Němec
CM	6	(Germany) Andreas Müller
CM	3	(Czech Republic) Radoslav Látal
AM	8	(Germany) Ingo Anderbrügge
CF	24	(Belgium) Marc Wilmots
Substitutes:
GK	22	(Germany) Mathias Schober
DF	5	(United States) Thomas Dooley
DF	21	(Germany) Marco Kurz
MF	16	(Germany) Oliver Held
FW	11	(Germany) Martin Max	(substituted on) 66'
Manager:
(Netherlands) Huub Stevens

GK	1	(Italy) Gianluca Pagliuca
SW	7	(Italy) Salvatore Fresi		(substituted off) 61'
RB	2	(Italy) Giuseppe Bergomi (c)
CB	19	(Italy) Massimo Paganin
CB	5	(Italy) Fabio Galante	(yellow card) 14'
LB	3	(Italy) Alessandro Pistone
CM	4	(Argentina) Javier Zanetti
CM	21	(Switzerland) Ciriaco Sforza
CM	14	(Netherlands) Aron Winter
CF	23	(Italy) Maurizio Ganz
CF	9	(Chile) Iván Zamorano
Substitutes:
GK	12	(Italy) Andrea Mazzantini
MF	15	(Italy) Sergio D'Autilia
MF	16	(Italy) Tiziano Polenghi
MF	18	(Italy) Nicola Berti		(substituted on) 61'
FW	27	(Italy) Marco Branca
Manager:
(England) Roy Hodgson

Assistant referees:
Pierre Ufrasi (France)
Jacques Poudevigne (France)
Fourth official:
Gilles Veissière (France)

Match rules

- 90 minutes
- Five named substitutes
- Maximum of three substitutions

==== Second leg ====
21 May 1997
20:45 CEST

Inter Milan (Italy)	1–0 (a.e.t.)	(Germany) Schalke 04
Zamorano 84'	Report
Penalties
Zamorano (penalty missed); Djorkaeff (penalty scored); Winter (penalty missed)	1–4	(penalty scored) Anderbrügge; (penalty scored) Thon; (penalty scored) Max; (penalty scored) Wilmots

Stadio Giuseppe Meazza, Milan
Attendance: 81,675
Referee: José María García-Aranda (Spain)

Internazionale	Schalke 04

GK	1	(Italy) Gianluca Pagliuca
RB	2	(Italy) Giuseppe Bergomi (c)		(substituted off) 70'
CB	19	(Italy) Massimo Paganin
CB	7	(Italy) Salvatore Fresi	(yellow card) 20' (yellow-red card) 89'
LB	3	(Italy) Alessandro Pistone
RM	4	(Argentina) Javier Zanetti		(substituted off) 119'
CM	8	(England) Paul Ince
LM	21	(Switzerland) Ciriaco Sforza		(substituted off) 80'
AM	6	(France) Youri Djorkaeff	(yellow card) 101'
CF	23	(Italy) Maurizio Ganz	(yellow card) 2'
CF	9	(Chile) Iván Zamorano	(yellow card) 98'
Substitutes:
GK	12	(Italy) Andrea Mazzantini
DF	20	(France) Jocelyn Angloma		(substituted on) 70'
MF	14	(Netherlands) Aron Winter		(substituted on) 80'
MF	15	(Italy) Sergio D'Autilia
MF	18	(Italy) Nicola Berti		(substituted on) 119'
Manager:
(England) Roy Hodgson

GK	1	(Germany) Jens Lehmann	(yellow card) 58'
SW	10	(Germany) Olaf Thon (c)	(yellow card) 66'
CB	25	(Netherlands) Johan de Kock
CB	2	(Germany) Thomas Linke
RWB	3	(Czech Republic) Radoslav Látal	(yellow card) 104'	(substituted off) 111'
LWB	19	(Germany) Mike Büskens
CM	4	(Germany) Yves Eigenrauch	(yellow card) 8'
CM	20	(Czech Republic) Jiří Němec
CM	6	(Germany) Andreas Müller		(substituted off) 97'
CF	11	(Germany) Martin Max
CF	24	(Belgium) Marc Wilmots	(yellow card) 70'
Substitutes:
GK	22	(Germany) Mathias Schober
DF	21	(Germany) Marco Kurz
MF	8	(Germany) Ingo Anderbrügge		(substituted on) 97'
MF	16	(Germany) Oliver Held		(substituted on) 111'
FW	14	(United States) David Wagner
Manager:
(Netherlands) Huub Stevens

Assistant referees:
Fernando Tresaco Gracia (Spain)
Manuel López Fernández (Spain)
Fourth official:
Victor José Esquinas Torres (Spain)

Match rules

- 90 minutes
- 30 minutes of golden goal extra time if necessary
- Penalty shoot-out if scores still level
- Five named substitutes
- Maximum of three substitutions

== See also ==
- 1997 UEFA Champions League final
- 1997 UEFA Cup Winners' Cup final
- FC Schalke 04 in European football
- Inter Milan in international football
- 1996–97 Inter Milan season
- 1996–97 FC Schalke 04 season
