= 1997–98 FC Schalke 04 season =

FC Schalke 04
1997–98 season
- Head coach: Huub Stevens
- Stadium: Parkstadion
- Bundesliga: 5th
- DFB-Pokal: Second round
- UEFA Cup: Quarter-finals
- Top goalscorer: League: Marc Wilmots (7); All: Marc Wilmots (10)

The 1997–98 season was the 94th season in the history of FC Schalke 04 and the club's seventh consecutive season in the top flight of German football.

== Competitions ==
=== Overall record ===
Competition	First match	Last match	Starting round	Final position	Record							
Competition	First match	Last match	Starting round	Final position	Pld	W	D	L	GF	GA	GD	Win %
Bundesliga	1 August 1997	9 May 1998	Matchday 1	5th	34	13	13	8	38	32	+6	38.24
DFB-Pokal	14 August 1997	23 Septembre 1998	First round	Second round	2	1	0	1	1	1	+0	50.00
UEFA Cup	16 September 1997	17 March 1998	First round	Quarter-finals	8	5	2	1	11	5	+6	62.50
Total					44	19	15	10	50	38	+12	43.18

Source: Competitions

=== Bundesliga ===
==== League table ====
Pos	Team	Pld	W	D	L	GF	GA	GD	Pts	Qualification or relegation
3	Bayer Leverkusen	34	14	13	7	66	39	+27	55	Qualification to UEFA Cup first round
4	VfB Stuttgart	34	14	10	10	55	49	+6	52	Qualification to UEFA Cup first round
5	Schalke 04	34	13	13	8	38	32	+6	52	Qualification to UEFA Cup first round
6	Hansa Rostock	34	14	9	11	54	46	+8	51	Qualification to Intertoto Cup third round
7	Werder Bremen	34	14	8	12	43	47	−4	50	Qualification to Intertoto Cup second round

Source: www.dfb.de
Rules for classification: 1) points; 2) goal difference; 3) number of goals scored.

==== Results by round ====
Round	1	2	3	4	5	6	7	8	9	10	11	12	13	14	15	16	17	18	19	20	21	22	23	24	25	26	27	28	29	30	31	32	33	34
Ground	H	A	H	A	H	A	H	A	H	A	A	H	A	H	A	H	A	A	H	A	H	A	H	A	H	A	H	H	A	H	A	H	A	H
Result	W	L	W	L	W	D	D	D	W	W	L	W	D	W	L	W	D	D	D	D	D	W	D	D	W	W	W	D	L	L	D	L	L	W
Position	3	8	3	11	3	4	6	6	4	3	5	3	3	3	5	4	5	5	5	5	5	5	4	4	4	4	4	4	4	4	4	5	6	5

Source: DFB
A = Away; H = Home; W = Win; D = Draw; L = Loss

==== Matches ====
1 August 1997 1	Schalke 04	2–1	Bayer Leverkusen	Gelsenkirchen
20:00 CEST (UTC+2)				Stadium: Parkstadion

5 August 1997 2	MSV Duisburg	1–0	Schalke 04	Duisburg
19:30 CEST (UTC+2)				Stadium: Wedaustadion

9 August 1997 3	Schalke 04	1–0	Borussia Dortmund	Gelsenkirchen
15:30 CEST (UTC+2)				Stadium: Parkstadion

23 August 1997 4	1. FC Kaiserslautern	3–0	Schalke 04	Kaiserslautern
15:30 CEST (UTC+2)				Stadium: Fritz-Walter-Stadion

30 August 1997 5	Schalke 04	2–0	Borussia Mönchengladbach	Gelsenkirchen
15:30 CEST (UTC+2)				Stadium: Parkstadion

13 September 1997 6	VfL Wolfsburg	0–0	Schalke 04	Wolfsburg
15:30 CEST (UTC+2)				Stadium: Wedaustadion

20 September 1997 7	Schalke 04	2–2	Hamburger SV	Gelsenkirchen
15:30 CEST (UTC+2)				Stadium: Parkstadion

26 September 1997 8	Bayern Munich	1–1	Schalke 04	Munich
20:00 CEST (UTC+2)				Stadium: Olympiastadion

4 October 1997 9	Schalke 04	1–0	Hertha BSC	Gelsenkirchen
15:30 CEST (UTC+2)				Stadium: Parkstadion

14 October 1997 10	1. FC Köln	0–2	Schalke 04	Cologne
20:00 CEST (UTC+2)				Stadium: Wedaustadion

18 October 1997 11	Hansa Rostock	4–1	Schalke 04	Rostock
15:30 CEST (UTC+2)				Stadium: Wedaustadion

24 October 1997 12	Schalke 04	2–0	VfL Bochum	Gelsenkirchen
20:00 CEST (UTC+2)				Stadium: Parkstadion

1 November 1997 13	VfB Stuttgart	0–0	Schalke 04	Stuttgart
15:30 CET (UTC+1)				Stadium: Gottlieb-Daimler-Stadion

8 November 1997 14	Schalke 04	2–0	Karlsruher SC	Gelsenkirchen
15:30 CET (UTC+1)				Stadium: Parkstadion

18 November 1997 15	Werder Bremen	2–1	Schalke 04	Bremen
20:00 CET (UTC+1)				Stadium: Weser-Stadion

22 November 1997 16	Schalke 04	2–0	1860 Munich	Gelsenkirchen
15:30 CET (UTC+1)				Stadium: Parkstadion

29 November 1997 17	Arminia Bielefeld	1–1	Schalke 04	Bielefeld
15:30 CET (UTC+1)				Stadium: Bielefelder Alm

6 December 1997 18	Bayer Leverkusen	0–0	Schalke 04	Leverkusen
15:30 CET (UTC+1)				Stadium: Ulrich-Haberland-Stadion

13 December 1997 19	Schalke 04	1–1	MSV Duisburg	Gelsenkirchen
15:30 CET (UTC+1)				Stadium: Parkstadion

19 December 1997 20	Borussia Dortmund	2–2	Schalke 04	Dortmund
20:00 CET (UTC+1)				Stadium: Westfalenstadion

31 January 1998 21	Schalke 04	1–1	1. FC Kaiserslautern	Gelsenkirchen
15:30 CET (UTC+1)				Stadium: Parkstadion

7 February 1998 22	Borussia Mönchengladbach	0–1	Schalke 04	Mönchengladbach
15:30 CET (UTC+1)				Stadium: Ulrich-Haberland-Stadion

14 February 1998 23	Schalke 04	1–1	VfL Wolfsburg	Gelsenkirchen
15:30 CET (UTC+1)				Stadium: Parkstadion

28 February 1998 24	Hamburger SV	1–1	Schalke 04	Hamburg
15:30 CET (UTC+1)				Stadium: Volksparkstadion

8 March 1998 25	Schalke 04	1–0	Bayern Munich	Gelsenkirchen
19:45 CET (UTC+1)				Stadium: Parkstadion

13 March 1998 26	Hertha BSC	1–4	Schalke 04	Berlin
20:00 CET (UTC+1)				Stadium: Volksparkstadion

28 March 1998 28	Schalke 04	0–0	Hansa Rostock	Gelsenkirchen
15:30 CET (UTC+1)				Stadium: Parkstadion

4 April 1998 29	VfL Bochum	3–0	Schalke 04	Bochum
15:30 CEST (UTC+2)				Stadium: Ruhrstadion

11 April 1998 30	Schalke 04	3–4	VfB Stuttgart	Gelsenkirchen
15:30 CEST (UTC+2)				Stadium: Parkstadion

18 April 1998 31	Karlsruher SC	0–0	Schalke 04	Karlsruhe
15:30 CEST (UTC+2)				Stadium: Wildparkstadion

25 April 1998 32	Schalke 04	0–1	Werder Bremen	Gelsenkirchen
15:30 CEST (UTC+2)				Stadium: Parkstadion

29 April 1998 27	Schalke 04	1–0	1. FC Köln	Gelsenkirchen
20:00 CEST (UTC+2)				Stadium: Parkstadion

2 May 1998 33	1860 Munich	1–0	Schalke 04	Munich
15:30 CEST (UTC+2)				Stadium: Olympiastadion; Attendance: 45,700; Referee: Lutz Wagner

9 May 1998 34	Schalke 04	2–1	Arminia Bielefeld	Gelsenkirchen
15:30 CEST (UTC+2)				Stadium: Parkstadion; Attendance: 62,000; Referee: Markus Merk

=== DFB-Pokal ===
14 August 1997 First round	FSV Zwickau	0–1	Schalke 04	Zwickau
			Wilmots 20'	Stadium: Westsachsenstadion; Attendance: 9,600; Referee: Winfried Buchhart

23 September 1997 Second round	Eintracht Trier	1–0	Schalke 04	Trier
	Thömmes 76'			Stadium: Moselstadion; Attendance: 16,000; Referee: Lange
