= Swiss Footballer of the Year =

Annual sports award

The Swiss Footballer of the Year is an annual award given to the best footballer based in Switzerland and the best Swiss national team player.

From the 1972–73 season until the 1997–98 season, the award was chosen by the now defunct Swiss newspaper Sport. Since the original award could only be won by a Swiss national, there was also a Foreigner of the Year award from 1973–74 until 1997–98.

Since 1998, two Player of the Year trophies have been awarded each year; one to the best player in the Swiss Super League known as the Axpo Swiss Super League Player of the Year and the other to the best national team player known as the Credit Suisse Player of the Year.

== Award winners ==
=== Swiss Super League Player of the Year ===
Awarded annually to the best player in the Swiss Super League.

Year	Player	Nationality	Club	Ref.
1998	Stefan Rehn	Sweden	Lausanne-Sport	
1999	Alexandre Rey	Switzerland	Servette	
2000	Charles Amoah	Ghana	St. Gallen	
2001	Stéphane Chapuisat	Switzerland	Grasshoppers	
2002	Murat Yakin	Switzerland	Basel	
2003	Hakan Yakin	Switzerland	Basel	
2004	Stéphane Chapuisat (2)	Switzerland	Young Boys	
2005	Ricardo Cabanas	Switzerland	Grasshoppers	
2006	Matías Delgado	Argentina	Basel	
2007	Mladen Petrić	Croatia	Basel	
2008	Hakan Yakin (2)	Switzerland	Young Boys	
2009	Seydou Doumbia	Ivory Coast	Young Boys	
2010	Seydou Doumbia (2)	Ivory Coast	Young Boys	
2011	Alexander Frei	Switzerland	Basel	
2012	Alexander Frei (2)	Switzerland	Basel	
2013	Mohamed Salah	Egypt	Basel	
2014	Shkëlzen Gashi	Albania	Grasshoppers	
2015	Breel Embolo	Switzerland	Basel	
2016	Guillaume Hoarau	France	Young Boys	
2017	Michael Lang	Switzerland	Basel	
2018	Kevin Mbabu	Switzerland	Young Boys	
2019	Jean-Pierre Nsame	Cameroon	Young Boys	
2020	Jean-Pierre Nsame (2)	Cameroon	Young Boys	
2021	Arthur Cabral	Brazil	Basel	
2022	Fabian Rieder	Switzerland	Young Boys	
2023	Meschak Elia	DR Congo	Young Boys	
2024	Alvyn Sanches	Switzerland	Lausanne-Sport	
2025	Xherdan Shaqiri	Switzerland	Basel	

=== Swiss Player of the Year ===
Awarded to the best player of the Swiss national team.

Year	Player	Club	Ref.
1998	Raphaël Wicky	(Germany) Werder Bremen	
1999	Ciriaco Sforza	(Germany) 1. FC Kaiserslautern	
2000	David Sesa	(Italy) Lecce	
2001	Stéphane Henchoz	(England) Liverpool	
2002	Stéphane Henchoz (2)	(England) Liverpool	
2003	Jörg Stiel	(Germany) Borussia Mönchengladbach	
2004	Alexander Frei	(France) Rennes	
2005	Alexander Frei (2)	(France) Rennes	
2006	Philippe Senderos	(England) Arsenal	
2007	Alexander Frei (3)	(Germany) Borussia Dortmund	
2008	Tranquillo Barnetta	(Germany) Bayer Leverkusen	
2009	Diego Benaglio	(Germany) VfL Wolfsburg	
2010	Benjamin Huggel	(Switzerland) Basel	
2011	Xherdan Shaqiri	(Switzerland) Basel	
2012	Xherdan Shaqiri (2)	(Switzerland) Basel	
2013	Diego Benaglio (2)	(Germany) VfL Wolfsburg	
2014	Ricardo Rodríguez	(Germany) VfL Wolfsburg	
2015	Stephan Lichtsteiner	(Italy) Juventus	
2016	Yann Sommer	(Germany) Borussia Mönchengladbach	
2017	Granit Xhaka	(England) Arsenal	
2018	Yann Sommer (2)	(Germany) Borussia Mönchengladbach	
2019	Haris Seferovic	(Portugal) Benfica	
2020	Not awarded		
2021	Yann Sommer (3)	(Germany) Borussia Mönchengladbach	
2022	Granit Xhaka (2)	(England) Arsenal	
2023	Granit Xhaka (3)	(Germany) Bayer Leverkusen	
2024	Granit Xhaka (4)	(Germany) Bayer Leverkusen	
2025	Granit Xhaka (5)	(England) Sunderland	

==== By player ====
Rank	Player	Wins
1	Granit Xhaka	5
2	Alexander Frei	3
2	Yann Sommer	3
4	Diego Benaglio	2
4	Stéphane Henchoz	2
4	Xherdan Shaqiri	2

== Sport Nationalliga A awards ==
Nationalliga A Foreigner of the Year
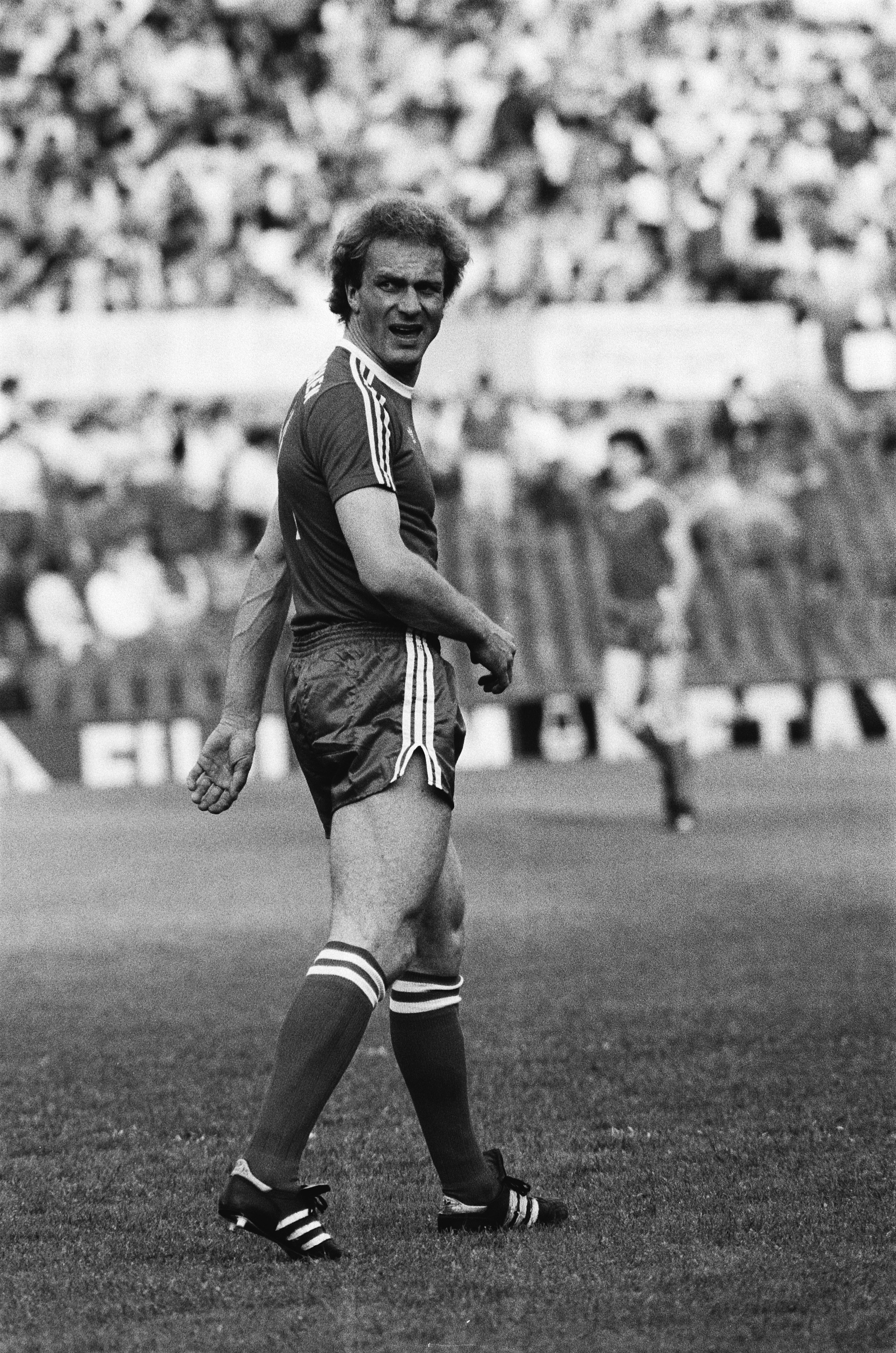
- 1989 award recipient Karl-Heinz Rummenigge
- Sport: Association football
- League: Nationalliga A
- Awarded for: best performing foreign player over the course of a season in the Nationalliga A.
- Presented by: Sport

History
- First award: 1975; 51 years ago
- Editions: 24
- Final award: 1998; 28 years ago
- First winner: (Socialist Federal Republic of Yugoslavia) Ilija Katić
- Most wins: (Socialist Federal Republic of Yugoslavia) Jurica Jerković (3 wins)
- Most recent: (Democratic Republic of the Congo) Shabani Nonda

=== 1975−1998: Foreigner of the Year ===
Previously awarded annually to the best foreign player in the Nationalliga A.

Season	Player	Nationality	Club
1975	Ilija Katić	Yugoslavia	Zürich
1976	Ilija Katić (2)	Yugoslavia	Zürich
1977	Eigil Nielsen	Denmark	Basel
1978	Martin Chivers	England	Servette
1979	Jurica Jerković	Yugoslavia	Zürich
1980	Piet Hamberg	Netherlands	Servette
1981	Robert Kok	Netherlands	Lausanne Sports
1982	Jurica Jerković (2)	Yugoslavia	Zürich
1983	Jurica Jerković (3)	Yugoslavia	Zürich
1984	Raúl Nogués	Argentina	La Chaux-de-Fonds
1985	Charly Herberth	Germany	FC Aarau
1986	Lars Lunde	Denmark	Young Boys Bern
1987	Robert Prytz	Sweden	Young Boys Bern
1988	John Eriksen	Denmark	Servette
1989	Karl-Heinz Rummenigge	Germany	Servette
1990	Ivan Zamorano	Chile	FC St. Gallen
1991	Edwin Gorter	Netherlands	FC Lugano
1992	Igor Dobrovolski	Russia	Servette
1993	Sonny Anderson	Brazil	Servette
1994	Giovane Élber	Brazil	Grasshoppers
1995	Petar Aleksandrov	Bulgaria	Neuchâtel Xamax
1996	Viorel Moldovan	Romania	Neuchâtel Xamax
1997	Viorel Moldovan (2)	Romania	Grasshoppers
1998	Shabani Nonda	DR Congo	Zürich

Nationalliga A Swiss Footballer of the Year
- Inaugural award recipient Karl Odermatt
- Sport: Association football
- League: Nationalliga A
- Awarded for: best performing Swiss player over the course of a season in the Nationalliga A.
- Presented by: Sport

History
- First award: 1973; 53 years ago
- Editions: 25
- Final award: 1998; 28 years ago
- First winner: Karl Odermatt
- Most wins: Heinz Hermann (5 wins)
- Most recent: Kubilay Türkyilmaz

=== 1973−1998: Swiss Footballer of the Year ===
Previously awarded to the best Swiss player playing in the Swiss Super League.

Season	Player	Club
1973	Karl Odermatt	Basel
1974	Not awarded	
1975	Umberto Barberis	Grasshoppers
1976	Köbi Kuhn	Zürich
1977	Hansjörg Pfister	Servette
1978	Rudolf Elsener	Grasshoppers
1979	Umberto Barberis (2)	Grasshoppers
1980	Umberto Barberis (3)	Grasshoppers
1981	Heinz Lüdi	Zürich
1982	Claudio Sulser	Grasshoppers
1983	Lucien Favre	Servette
1984	Heinz Hermann	Grasshoppers
1985	Heinz Hermann (2)	Grasshoppers
1985	Rolf Osterwalder	Aarau
1986	Heinz Hermann (3)	Neuchâtel Xamax
1987	Heinz Hermann (4)	Neuchâtel Xamax
1988	Heinz Hermann (5)	Neuchâtel Xamax
1989	Peter Nadig	Luzern
1990	Andy Egli	Grasshoppers
1991	Adrian Knup	Luzern
1992	Jean-Paul Brigger	Sion
1993	Ciriaco Sforza	Grasshoppers
1994	Thomas Bickel	Grasshoppers
1995	Nestor Subiat	Grasshoppers
1996	Kubilay Türkyilmaz	Grasshoppers
1997	Kubilay Türkyilmaz (2)	Grasshoppers
1998	Kubilay Türkyilmaz (3)	Grasshoppers
