= Dongelberg =

- Village
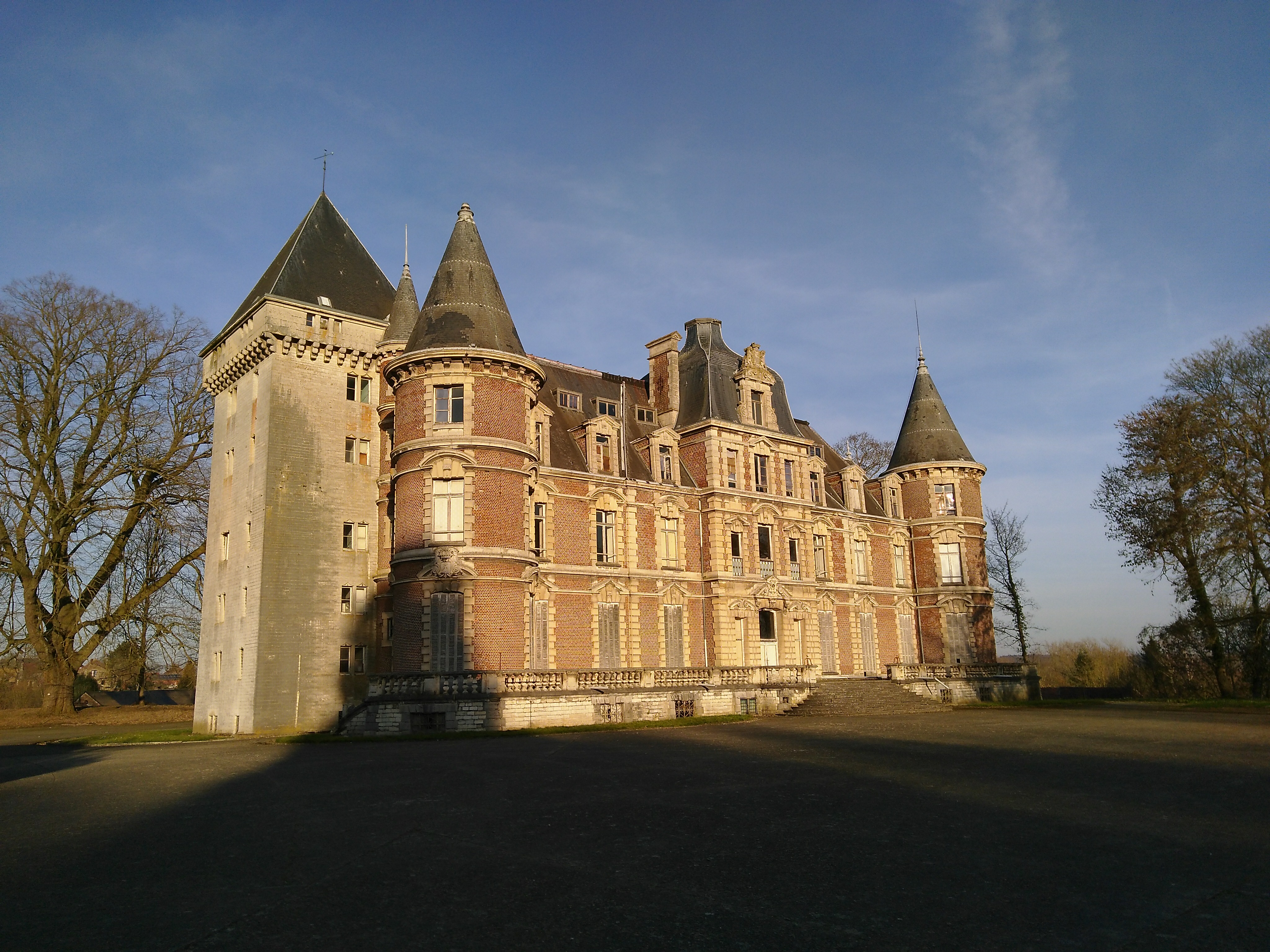
- Dongelberg Castle

- Location in Dongelberg, Belgium
- Coordinates: 50°42′N 4°49′E
- Country: Belgium
- Municipality: Jodoigne
- Province: Walloon Brabant
- Elevation: 102 m (335 ft)
- Time zone: UTC+2:00 (UTC+02:00)

Dongelberg (Walloon: Dongbiè) is a village of Wallonia and a district of the municipality of Jodoigne, located in the province of Walloon Brabant, Belgium.

The name means dark mountain.

== History ==
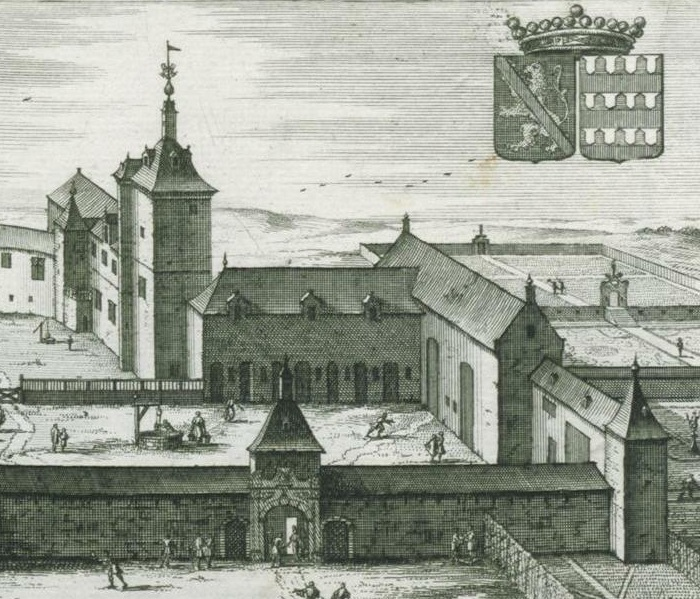
17th-century view of the castle

Dongelberg appears as Donglebert in a text dated 1079 and Dungelberge in the 12th century. In the Middle Ages the settlement was a fief of several families, including the Dongelberg family until 1305, before falling entirely under the control of Jean Meeuwe, the half brother of John II, Duke of Brabant. It was an independent municipality until 1977, when it was placed within Jodoigne as part of the fusion of the Belgian municipalities.

In time of the German occupation of Belgium during World War II, in 1942–1945, the Germans operated an internment camp for British, Australian and South African women in Dongelberg.

== People born in Dongelberg ==
- Marc Wilmots (footballer)
