= Sergio D'Autilia =

Italian footballer

Personal information
- Date of birth: 20 August 1977 (age 49)
- Place of birth: Galatina, Italy
- Height: 1.82 m (6 ft 0 in)
- Positions: Midfielder; forward

Youth career
- ?–1996: Inter Milan

Senior career*
Years	Team	Apps	(Gls)
1996	Inter Milan	0	(0)
1997	→ Foggia (loan)		
1998	→ Saronno (loan)		
1998–1999	→ Atletico Catania (loan)		
1999	→ Viareggio (loan)		
2014–2016	Brera		
- * Club domestic league appearances and goals

Sergio D'Autilia (born 20 August 1977) is an Italian former professional footballer who played as a forward. He made his fully professional club debut for Inter Milan in the 1996–97 Coppa Italia on 6 November 1996 against Cagliari. While he never played a league match with Inter, he had 19 appearances on the bench during the 1996–97 Inter Milan season and also in the second leg of the 1997 UEFA Cup Final against FC Schalke 04.

In 2014, he joined lower-league side Brera.
