= Michael Prus =

German footballer and coach

Personal information
- Date of birth: 4 February 1968 (age 58)
- Place of birth: Rheine, West Germany
- Height: 1.78 m (5 ft 10 in)
- Position: Defender

Youth career
- Eintracht Rodde
- VfB Rheine

Senior career*
Years	Team	Apps	(Gls)
1986–1996	Schalke 04	220	(0)
1996–1998	SV Meppen	56	(1)
1998–2003	Eintracht Trier	92	(0)

Managerial career
- 2003–2005: Eintracht Trier (youth team)
- 2005: Eintracht Trier
- * Club domestic league appearances and goals

Michael Prus (born 4 February 1968) is a German football coach and former player, who played as a defender.
