= Martin Max =

German footballer (born 1968)

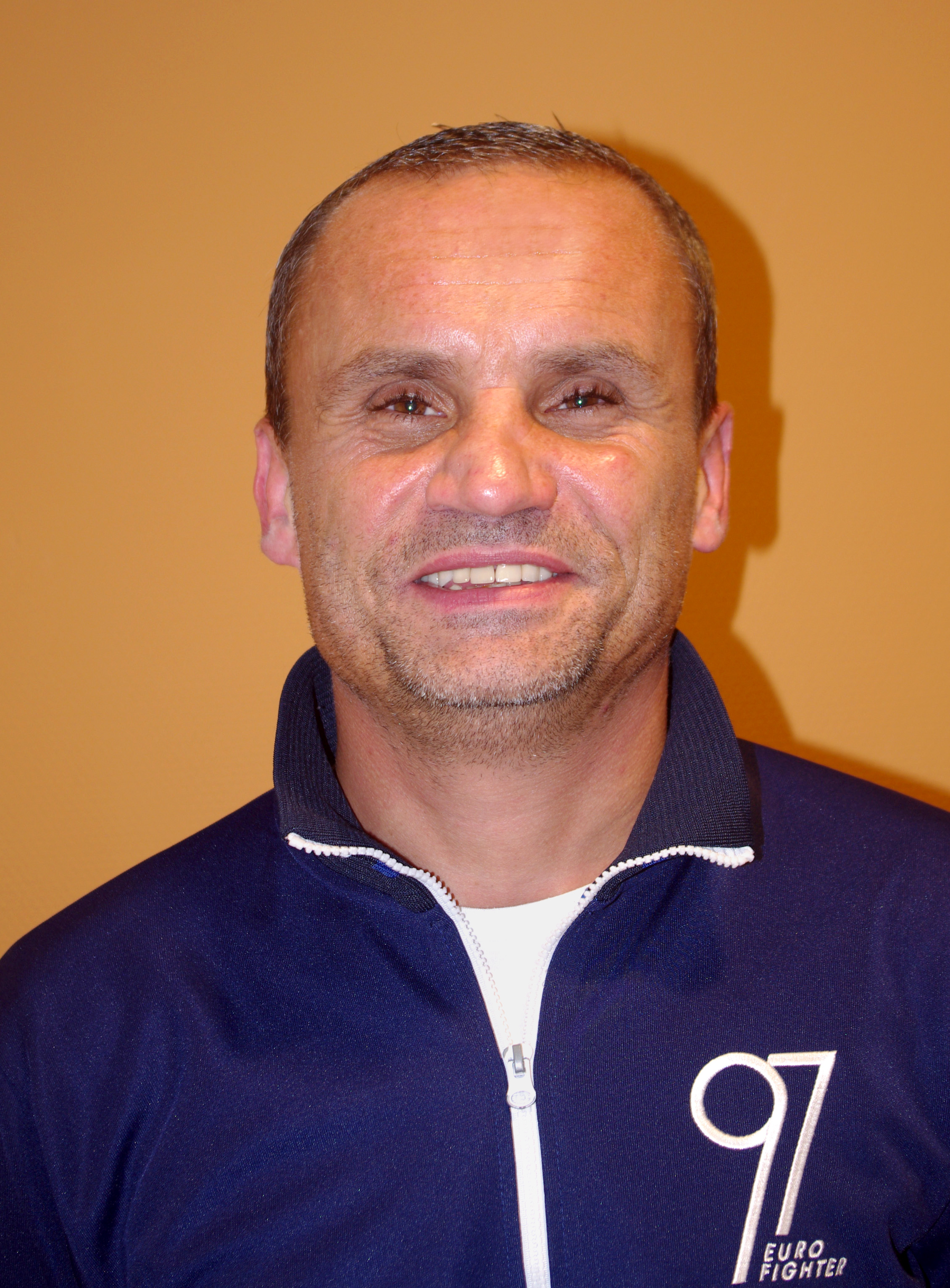
- Max in 2018

Personal information
- Date of birth: 7 August 1968 (age 58)
- Place of birth: Tarnowitz, Poland
- Height: 1.82 m (6 ft 0 in)
- Position: Striker

Youth career
- Rodło Górniki Bytom
- Blau-Weiß Post Recklinghausen
- FC Recklinghausen

Senior career*
Years	Team	Apps	(Gls)
1989–1995	Borussia Mönchengladbach	142	(22)
1995–1999	Schalke 04	109	(33)
1999–2003	1860 Munich	112	(51)
2003–2004	Hansa Rostock	33	(20)
Total		396	(126)

International career
2002	Germany	1	(0)
- * Club domestic league appearances and goals

Martin Max (German pronunciation: [ˈmaʁtiːn maks]; born 7 August 1968) is a German former professional footballer who played as a striker. One of the oldest winners of the Bundesliga's top scorer crown, at the age of 32 and 34, he represented four teams in the Bundesliga.

== Biography ==
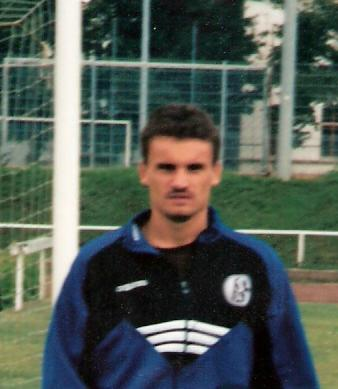
Max with Schalke in 1996

Born in Tarnowskie Góry in Upper Silesia, Max started to play football in the youth of Rodło Górniki Bytom. Moving to Hansa Rostock at the age of 35, Max contributed to the former East Germany club's comfortable league position, as he netted 20 goals and ranked third in the goal charts. Max retired at the end of the season with a total of 396 matches, with 126 first division goals.

On 17 April 2002, Max earned his only appearance for Germany, coming on as a substitute during the 84th minute during a 1–0 friendly loss in the Gottlieb-Daimler-Stadion (today MHPArena) in Stuttgart against Argentina. He was subsequently named on stand-by for the 2002 FIFA World Cup.

His son, Philipp, is also a footballer.

== Career statistics ==
Appearances and goals by club, season and competition
Club	Season	League			DFB-Pokal		Europe		Other		Total	
Club	Season	Division	Apps	Goals	Apps	Goals	Apps	Goals	Apps	Goals	Apps	Goals
Borussia Mönchengladbach	1989–90	Bundesliga	11	0	1	0	—		—		12	0
Borussia Mönchengladbach	1990–91	Bundesliga	30	7	0	0	—		—		30	7
Borussia Mönchengladbach	1991–92	Bundesliga	36	4	6	2	—		—		42	6
Borussia Mönchengladbach	1992–93	Bundesliga	21	3	1	0	—		—		22	3
Borussia Mönchengladbach	1993–94	Bundesliga	24	8	1	0	—		—		25	8
Borussia Mönchengladbach	1994–95	Bundesliga	20	0	1	0	—		—		21	0
Borussia Mönchengladbach	Total		142	22	10	2	—		—		152	24
Schalke 04	1995–96	Bundesliga	32	11	2	0	—		—		34	11
Schalke 04	1996–97	Bundesliga	30	12	2	1	10 (Note: Appearances in UEFA Cup)	3	—		42	16
Schalke 04	1997–98	Bundesliga	19	4	0	0	6	1	—		25	5
Schalke 04	1998–99	Bundesliga	28	6	1	1	2	0	1 (Note: Appearance in DFB Ligapokal)	0	32	7
Schalke 04	Total		109	33	5	2	18	4	1	0	133	39
1860 Munich	1999–2000	Bundesliga	32	19	2	2	—		—		34	21
1860 Munich	2000–01	Bundesliga	31	8	3	2	7 (Note: Two appearances in UEFA Champions League, five appearances and three goals in UEFA Cup)	3	—		41	13
1860 Munich	2001–02	Bundesliga	28	18	4	3	6 (Note: Appearances in UEFA Intertoto Cup)	5	—		38	26
1860 Munich	2002–03	Bundesliga	21	6	2	5	2	0	—		25	11
1860 Munich	Total		112	51	11	12	15	8	—		138	71
Hansa Rostock	2003–04	Bundesliga	33	20	2	0	—		—		35	20
Career total			396	126	28	16	33	12	1	0	458	154

== Honours ==
Borussia Mönchengladbach

- DFB-Pokal: 1994–95

Schalke 04

- UEFA Cup: 1996–97

Individual

- Bundesliga top goalscorer: 1999–2000, 2001–02
