= Iván Zamorano =

Chilean footballer (born 1967)

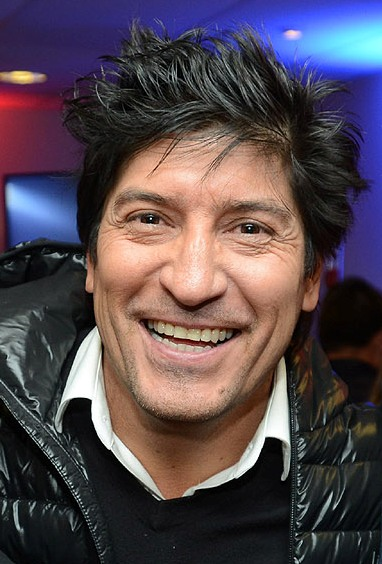
- Zamorano in 2013

Personal information
- Full name: Iván Luis Zamorano Zamora
- Birth name: Iván Luis Zamorano Zamora
- Date of birth: 18 January 1967 (age 59)
- Place of birth: Santiago, Chile
- Height: 1.78 m (5 ft 10 in)
- Position: Striker

Youth career
- 1983–1985: Cobresal

Senior career*
Years	Team	Apps	(Gls)
1985–1988	Cobresal	45	(22)
1985–1986	→ Cobreandino (loan)	29	(27)
1988–1990	St. Gallen	56	(34)
1990–1992	Sevilla	59	(21)
1992–1996	Real Madrid	137	(77)
1996–2001	Inter Milan	101	(25)
2001–2003	América	63	(33)
2003	Colo-Colo	14	(8)
Total		504	(247)

International career
2000	Chile Olympic (O.P.)	5	(6)
1987–2001	Chile	69	(34)
Medal record
Men's Football
Bronze medal – third place	2000 Sydney	Team competition
- * Club domestic league appearances and goals

Iván Luis Zamorano Zamora (Latin American Spanish: [iˈβan samoˈɾano]; born 18 January 1967) is a Chilean former professional footballer who played as a striker. He is regarded as one of Chile's most recognized footballers and one of the greatest strikers of his generation.

He first appeared as a member of the Chile national team in 1987, appearing on the team every year until 2001. During his tenure, he played in the 1998 World Cup, four Copa América tournaments, and the Olympics in 2000 with the u-23 team, where he won a bronze medal and was the top scorer of the tournament. He played for several clubs, notably Spanish clubs Sevilla and Real Madrid; Italian club Inter Milan as well as Liga MX club América. He won the 1994–95 La Liga title and was the season's top scorer with Real Madrid. He also won the UEFA Cup with Inter Milan in 1998, as well as the Liga MX title with America his first season with the club. A powerful and prolific goalscorer, he was particularly renowned for his strength and ability in the air, with many of his goals coming from headers.

In 2004, Zamorano was selected among the FIFA 100, a list of the best living football players in the world compiled by Pelé.

Zamorano was nicknamed Bam Bam and Iván el Terrible.

== Club career ==
Zamorano started his career in Chile with Cobresal in December 1985. He was loaned out to Chilean Primera Division B club Trasandino (called Cobreandino between 1985 and 1992) for the 1985–86 season. He returned to the club shortly after and won the 1987 Copa Chile with Cobresal. In 1988, he moved to Europe to Swiss team St. Gallen, becoming the league's top scorer in the 1989–90 season, and scoring 37 goals in 61 matches across three seasons. In 1990, Zamorano debuted in the Spanish Primera División with Sevilla, where he would play 63 matches and score 23 goals in all competitions before being sold to Real Madrid for $6 million.

With Real Madrid, between 1992 and 1996, Zamorano won one league, one Copa del Rey and one Spanish Supercup title. In 1995, under manager Jorge Valdano, Zamorano helped Real Madrid win the Spanish League title, as he scored 28 goals – including a hat–trick against Barcelona – and received the Pichichi Trophy as the season's top scorer. That year, he formed a particularly effective attacking partnership with playmaker Michael Laudrup. In the 1992–93 and 1994–95 seasons, he won the EFE Trophy, which is awarded to the best Ibero-American player in La Liga every year by Spanish news agency EFE. In total, Zamorano appeared 173 times for Real Madrid, scoring 101 goals.

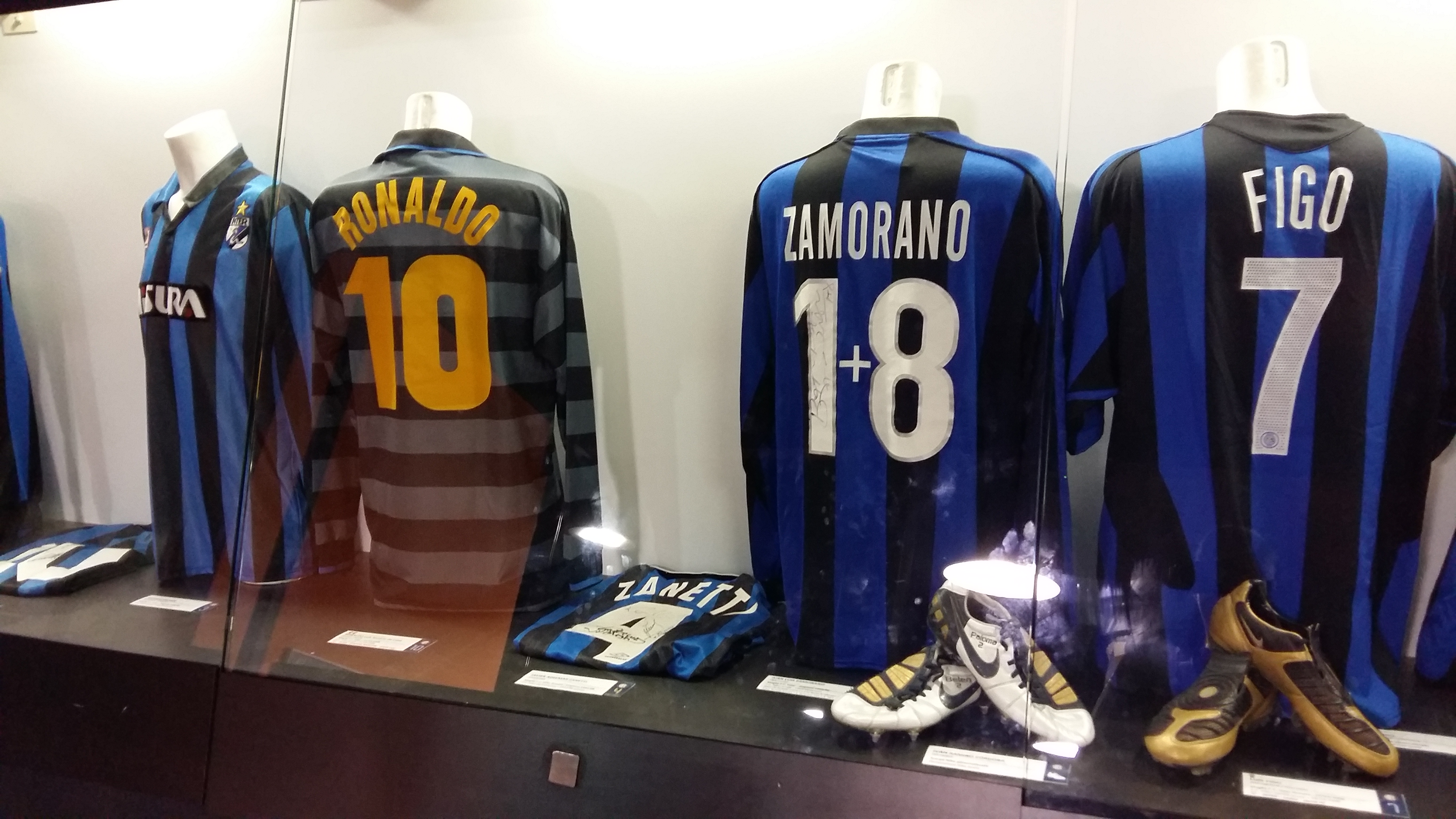
Zamorano's Inter Milan jersey (one plus eight) next to Ronaldo (number 10), Zanetti (number 4) and Figo (seven) in the San Siro museum

After six seasons in the Spanish league, Zamorano played four seasons in Serie A with Inter Milan, from 1996 to 2000, where he was teammates with Youri Djorkaeff, Diego Simeone, Javier Zanetti and Ronaldo, among others. He was initially the club's premier striker, playing with the number nine shirt. However, after Roberto Baggio's arrival at the club, Ronaldo was forced to give up number ten, and wear number nine according to the terms of a Nike sponsorship. Therefore Zamorano had to give up his number and chose number 18, adding a "+" to his shirt to create the equation '1+8', making him mathematically still a number 9 striker. In May 1998, Inter won the UEFA Cup after beating Lazio in the final 3–0, with Zamorano scoring the opening goal. He had also scored in the second leg of the previous year's final, with the game going to penalties. However, Zamorano missed his penalty as Inter lost the shootout to Schalke 04 4–1.

Zamorano would move to Mexico in 2001 to play for América for two seasons, winning the Torneo de Verano in the first season. He concluded his career playing for Colo-Colo in 2003, making a childhood dream come true. He announced his retirement in July of that year after a professional career spanning more than 16 years.

== International career ==
Zamorano made his debut at the age of 20 on 19 June 1987, scoring a goal in a 3–1 friendly win against Peru. He scored five goals on 29 April 1997 in a 1998 World Cup qualifier against Venezuela, which ended in a 6–0 victory. He played all four of Chile's matches at the 1998 World Cup; he was an instrumental part of the Chilean team despite failing to score, setting up Marcelo Salas' goal in a 1–1 draw against Austria. In the 2000 Olympic Games, he won the bronze medal, scoring a brace in a 2–0 victory against United States, and was the top scorer with six goals. His last international match, at age 34, was a farewell friendly between Chile and France on 1 September 2001, which Chile won 2–1. Zamorano was capped 69 times, scoring 34 goals.

== Personal life ==
Zamorano was born in Santiago, Chile and was the only son of Luis Zamorano and Alicia Zamora. The family moved to Maipu three years later. When he was 13, his father whom he inherited a love of football from died of fulminating appendicitis.

He has a long-term close friendship with his former fellow footballer Fabián Estay, which was interrupted from 2001 to 2007 due to the fact that Estay stated that Zamorano didn't support him when he was isolated from the América first team by the club leaders. In addition, Zamorano is the godfather of the Estay's daughter, Renata Ivana.

In 2005, he married María Alberó, an Argentine model. Since 2016, they have lived in Miami.

== Outside football ==
In 2007, Zamorano was the promotional face of the new Santiago transport system, Transantiago, which experienced operational difficulties at launch.

In 2021, Zamorano became brand ambassador for Betsson as part of the Chilean national team choosing the sports betting site as its official betting partner ahead of the 2022 FIFA World Cup.

He has worked as a football commentator for media such as Univision and TUDN.

== Career statistics ==
=== Club ===
Appearances and goals by club, season and competition
Club	Season	League			Cup		Continental		Total	
Club	Season	Division	Apps	Goals	Apps	Goals	Apps	Goals	Apps	Goals
Cobresal	1985	Primera División	2	0	0	0	0	0	2	0
Cobresal	1986	Primera División	0	0	3	1	0	0	3	1
Cobresal	Total		2	0	3	1	0	0	5	1
Cobreandino	1986	Segunda División	29	27	0	0	0	0	29	27
Cobresal	1987	Primera División	14	14	14	13	0	0	28	27
Cobresal	1988	Primera División	29	8	0	0	0	0	29	8
Cobresal	Total		43	22	14	13	0	0	57	35
St. Gallen	1988–89	Swiss Super League	17	10	1	0	0	0	18	10
St. Gallen	1989–90	Swiss Super League	33	23	3	2	0	0	36	25
St. Gallen	1990–91	Swiss Super League	6	1	0	0	4	2	10	3
St. Gallen	Total		56	34	4	2	4	2	64	38
Sevilla	1990–91	La Liga	29	9	3	1	0	0	32	10
Sevilla	1991–92	La Liga	30	12	1	1	0	0	31	13
Sevilla	Total		59	21	4	2	0	0	63	23
Real Madrid	1992–93	La Liga	34	26	4	6	7	5	45	37
Real Madrid	1993–94	La Liga	36	11	6	4	5	2	47	17
Real Madrid	1994–95	La Liga	38	28	1	0	5	3	44	31
Real Madrid	1995–96	La Liga	29	12	4	0	5	4	38	16
Real Madrid	Total		137	77	15	10	22	14	174	101
Inter Milan	1996–97	Serie A	31	7	6	4	10	2	47	13
Inter Milan	1997–98	Serie A	13	1	2	0	5	2	20	3
Inter Milan	1998–99	Serie A	25	9	3	2	10	3	38	14
Inter Milan	1999–2000	Serie A	30	7	5	1	–		35	8
Inter Milan	2000–01	Serie A	2	1	2	0	4	0	8	1
Inter Milan	Total		101	25	18	7	29	7	148	39
América	2000–01	Primera División	17	11	0	0	0	0	17	11
América	2001–02	Primera División	35	18	0	0	9	4	44	22
América	2002–03	Primera División	11	4	0	0	0	0	11	4
América	Total		63	33	0	0	9	4	72	37
Colo-Colo	2003	Primera División	14	8	0	0	4	0	18	8
Career total			490	233	73	50	59	25	622	349

=== International ===
Appearances and goals by national team and year
National team	Year	Apps	Goals
Chile	1987	5	1
Chile	1988	5	0
Chile	1989	2	1
Chile	1990	0	0
Chile	1991	9	6
Chile	1992	0	0
Chile	1993	1	0
Chile	1994	2	2
Chile	1995	1	1
Chile	1996	8	5
Chile	1997	5	9
Chile	1998	8	2
Chile	1999	8	3
Chile	2000	10	4
Chile	2001	5	0
Total		69	34

Scores and results list Chile's goal tally first, score column indicates score after each Zamorano goal.

List of international goals scored by Iván Zamorano
No.	Date	Venue	Opponent	Score	Result	Competition
1	19 June 1987	Estadio Nacional, Lima, Peru	Peru	3–1	3–1	Friendly
2	6 August 1989	Brígido Iriarte Stadium, Caracas, Venezuela	Venezuela	3–1	3–1	1990 World Cup qualification
3	30 June 1991	Estadio Nacional de Chile, Santiago, Chile	Ecuador	2–0	3–1	Friendly
4	6 July 1991	Estadio Nacional de Chile, Santiago, Chile	Venezuela	2–0	2–0	1991 Copa América
5	8 July 1991	Estadio Municipal de Concepción, Concepción, Chile	Peru	3–1	4–2	1991 Copa América
6	8 July 1991	Estadio Municipal de Concepción, Concepción, Chile	Peru	4-2	4–2	1991 Copa América
7	14 July 1991	Estadio Nacional de Chile, Santiago, Chile	Paraguay	2–0	4–0	1991 Copa América
8	17 July 1991	Estadio Nacional de Chile, Santiago, Chile	Colombia	1–1	1–1	1991 Copa América
9	22 March 1994	Stade de Gerland, Lyon, France	France	1–1	1–3	Friendly
10	25 May 1994	Estadio Nacional de Chile, Santiago, Chile	Peru	2–1	2–1	Friendly
11	20 March 1995	Los Angeles Memorial Coliseum, Los Angeles, United States	Mexico	1–0	2–1	Friendly
12	23 April 1996	Estadio Regional de Antofagasta, Antofagasta, Chile	Australia	1–0	3–0	Friendly
13	23 April 1996	Estadio Regional de Antofagasta, Antofagasta, Chile	Australia	3–0	3–0	Friendly
14	6 July 1996	Estadio Nacional de Chile, Santiago, Chile	Ecuador	1–0	4–1	1998 World Cup qualification
15	6 July 1996	Estadio Nacional de Chile, Santiago, Chile	Ecuador	3–1	4–1	1998 World Cup qualification
16	1 September 1996	Estadio Metropolitano Roberto Meléndez, Barranquilla, Colombia	Colombia	1–4	1–4	1998 World Cup qualification
17	12 January 1997	Estadio Nacional, Lima, Peru	Peru	1–2	1–2	1998 World Cup qualification
18	29 April 1997	Estadio Monumental David Arellano, Santiago, Chile	Venezuela	1–0	6–0	1998 World Cup qualification
19	29 April 1997	Estadio Monumental David Arellano, Santiago, Chile	Venezuela	2–0	6–0	1998 World Cup qualification
20	29 April 1997	Estadio Monumental David Arellano, Santiago, Chile	Venezuela	3–0	6–0	1998 World Cup qualification
21	29 April 1997	Estadio Monumental David Arellano, Santiago, Chile	Venezuela	4–0	6–0	1998 World Cup qualification
22	29 April 1997	Estadio Monumental David Arellano, Santiago, Chile	Venezuela	6–0	6–0	1998 World Cup qualification
23	5 July 1997	Estadio Nacional de Chile, Santiago, Chile	Colombia	4–1	4–1	1998 World Cup qualification
24	20 July 1997	Estadio Nacional de Chile, Santiago, Chile	Paraguay	1–0	2–1	1998 World Cup qualification
25	20 July 1997	Estadio Nacional de Chile, Santiago, Chile	Paraguay	3–0	2–1	1998 World Cup qualification
26	24 May 1998	Estadio Nacional de Chile, Santiago, Chile	Uruguay	1–0	2–2	Friendly
27	31 May 1998	Stade Alexandre Tropenas, Montélimar, France	Tunisia	3–2	3–2	Friendly
28	3 July 1999	Estadio Antonio Oddone Sarubbi, Ciudad del Este, Paraguay	Venezuela	1–0	3–0	1999 Copa América
29	11 July 1999	Estadio Feliciano Cáceres, Luque, Paraguay	Colombia	3–2	3–2	1999 Copa América
30	13 July 1999	Estadio Defensores del Chaco, Asunción, Paraguay	Uruguay	1–1	1–1 (3–5 PSO)	1999 Copa América
31	3 June 2000	Estadio Centenario, Montevideo, Uruguay	Uruguay	1–1	1–2	2002 World Cup qualification
32	29 June 2000	Estadio Nacional de Chile, Santiago, Chile	Paraguay	3–1	3–1	2002 World Cup qualification
33	25 July 2000	Estadio Polideportivo de Pueblo Nuevo, San Cristóbal, Venezuela	Venezuela	2–0	2–0	2002 World Cup qualification
34	15 August 2000	Estadio Nacional de Chile, Santiago, Chile	Brazil	2–0	3–0	2002 World Cup qualification

== Honours ==
Cobreandino

- Segunda División de Chile: 1985

Cobresal

- Copa Chile: 1987

Real Madrid

- La Liga: 1994–95
- Copa del Rey: 1992–93
- Supercopa de España: 1993

Inter Milan

- UEFA Cup: 1997–98; runner-up 1996–97

América

- Mexican Primera División: Verano 2002
- Selectivo Pre Pre-Libertadores: 2001
- Pre-Libertadores Tournament: 2001

Chile

- Olympic Bronze Medal: 2000

Individual

- Swiss Super League Best Foreign Player: 1989–90
- EFE Trophy: 1992–93, 1994–95
- Pichichi Trophy: 1994–95
- Don Balón Award: 1994–95
- European Sports Media Team of the Year: 1994–95
- Olympic Games top scorer: 2000
- FIFA 100
- Soccer Hall of Fame: 2024
