= Ciriaco Sforza =

Swiss footballer (born 1970)

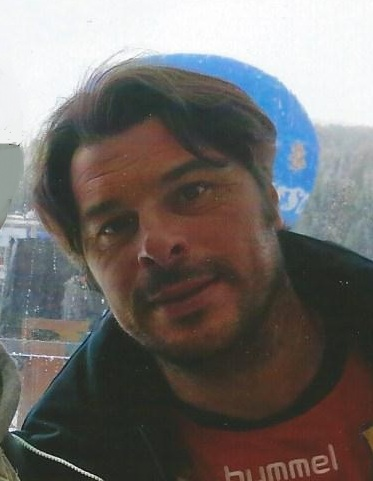
- Sforza c. 2013

Personal information
- Date of birth: 2 March 1970 (age 56)
- Place of birth: Wohlen, Switzerland
- Height: 1.80 m (5 ft 11 in)
- Position: Midfielder

Youth career
- 1986–1989: FC Wohlen

Senior career*
Years	Team	Apps	(Gls)
1989–1990	FC Aarau	22	(3)
1990–1993	Grasshoppers	75	(7)
1993–1995	1. FC Kaiserslautern	61	(15)
1995–1996	Bayern Munich	30	(2)
1996–1997	Inter Milan	26	(2)
1997–2000	1. FC Kaiserslautern	91	(4)
2000–2002	Bayern Munich	35	(1)
2002–2006	1. FC Kaiserslautern	47	(1)
Total		387	(34)

International career
1991–2001	Switzerland	79	(7)

Managerial career
- 2006–2008: Luzern
- 2009–2012: Grasshopper
- 2014–2015: Wohlen
- 2015: Thun
- 2019–2020: Wil
- 2020–2021: Basel
- 2024–2025: Schaffhausen
- * Club domestic league appearances and goals

Ciriaco Sforza (Italian pronunciation: [tʃiˈriːako ˈsfɔrtsa]; born 2 March 1970) is a Swiss football manager and former professional player who last managed Swiss Challenge League club FC Schaffhausen.

After beginning his career with Swiss clubs FC Aarau and Grasshopper Club Zürich, he most notably played for Inter Milan in Italy, and 1. FC Kaiserslautern, and Bayern Munich in Germany. Sforza represented the Switzerland national team 79 times, and represented his country at the 1994 World Cup and Euro 96.

== Early and personal life ==
Sforza was born Wohlen, in German-speaking Switzerland, where he was also raised, to an Italian father from Avellino. According to his website, he is married and has two children.

== Club career ==
Sforza started his career in his hometown club FC Wohlen. He was signed by FC Aarau in 1989, where he impressed commentators and fans alike. Sforza's precocious talent was soon noticed, and he was signed by Swiss club Grasshoppers Zürich one year later. He represented Grasshoppers during three successful seasons, also setting a record for the club as the youngest player to make his debut in the Swiss Challenge League. He won the 1991 Swiss Super League championship with the club, and made his national team debut in August 1991. In 1993, after winning the "Swiss footballer of the Year" award, he moved abroad to Germany to play for 1. FC Kaiserslautern.

Sforza became the general of the Kaiserslautern midfield and was recognised as one of the best midfielders in the German Bundesliga championship, also receiving a Ballon d'Or nomination in 1994, finishing in 21st place. After two seasons at Kaiserslautern, he was bought by German giants Bayern Munich in 1995. Sforza was signed at the same time as German superstar Jürgen Klinsmann, compared to the homely small-town club Kaiserslautern, Bayern was a team with many stars. Conflicts between Klinsmann and team captain Lothar Matthäus poisoned the atmosphere, and many scandals underlined why Bayern is nicknamed FC Hollywood. Bayern also missed out on the German championship for the second consecutive season, though Sforza was a part of the 1996 UEFA Cup winning Bayern team.

Sforza initially had trouble settling in at Bayern, and after one season at the club he moved to Italy. He signed for Inter Milan, where he was united with former Swiss national team manager Roy Hodgson. Sforza was regarded as one of the most promising young Swiss players at the time, and he made a notable debut with Inter, scoring the winning goal in a 1–0 away win on 7 September 1996 against Udinese. Despite the initial glimpses of his potential, Sforza also had a difficult time at Inter Milan. Although Hodgson had initially purchased him as to function as a playmaker, to solve Inter's lack of creativity in midfield, Sforza had problems performing consistently, and he spent a lot of time on the bench, although he was able to reach the UEFA Cup final with the club, and also managed a third-place finish in the league. During his time with Inter, Sforza became known for his inconsistency in Serie A, and he is famously remembered in Italy for being referenced in the Italian film Tre Uomini e una Gamba, by Italian comedic trio Aldo, Giovanni e Giacomo; in the film, Aldo states that he had to purchase Sforza's number 21 Inter jersey as Ronaldo's was out of stock.

After a single season with Inter, he moved once again – but this time to known territory. In time for the 1997–98 season, Sforza moved back to Kaiserslautern, where he immediately made an impression, experiencing a more successful stint with the club and finally demonstrating strong and consistent performances, which justified his reputation as one of the leading Swiss players of his generation. Even though Kaiserslautern had just been promoted from the 2. Bundesliga, Kaiserslautern became German champions, beating Sforza's other former team, German giants FC Bayern, to the title. Sforza spent two more seasons at Kaiserslautern, impressing commentators and fans alike.

In 2000, he decided to give FC Bayern Munich another try. Once again, he failed to perform and spent a lot of time on the sidelines, although he later managed to participate in a more successful period with the club. FC Bayern had many star players competing for places, and the team won both the 2000–01 Bundesliga and 2000–01 UEFA Champions League titles that season. After two seasons at Bayern, he returned to Kaiserslautern for a third spell in 2002. The ageing and now somewhat injury-prone Sforza helped FCK avoid relegation; however, in October 2005, he had a public falling-out with the club and was blackballed. He retired at the end of the season, in summer 2006.

== International career ==
Sforza was selected to play for Switzerland at the 1994 FIFA World Cup by national manager Roy Hodgson, putting on a notable performance and reaching the round of 16. He represented Switzerland at the UEFA Euro 1996 tournament in England, where they were eliminated in the first round. He also captained the Swiss national side. In total, he managed 79 appearances for Switzerland, scoring 7 goals.

== Managerial career ==
Sforza went on to become manager of Swiss team FC Luzern, and was sacked after two more or less successful years managing the team. On 9 June 2009, he was named as the new manager of Grasshopper Club Zürich. signing a contract between 30 June 2011. On 13 April 2012, Sforza left the club after poor results.

In February 2014, he was appointed as the new head coach of FC Wohlen, replacing David Sesa.

On 1 April 2019, he became the manager of FC Wil.

On 26 August 2020, Sforza became the head coach of Basel, signing a two-year contract. He took his assistant Daniel Hasler from Wil with him. Massimo Colomba was goalkeeper coach and on 21 September the club announced that they had hired Patrick Rahmen as second assistant coach to complete Sforza's coaching team. Sforza's first match was on 17 September in the 2020–21 UEFA Europa League second qualifying round against Croatian team Osijek which ended with a 2–1 victory. On 6 April 2021 the club announced that, due to the lack of sporting success, FC Basel 1893 were separating themselves from head coach Ciriaco Sforza with immediate effect. They also announced that they separated themselves from assistant manager Daniel Hasler at the same time.

On 14 June 2024, after three years away from coaching, he was confirmed as the new head coach of FC Schaffhausen, who play in the Swiss Challenge League, the second tier of Switzerland. He was dismissed from his position on 4 March 2025, with Schaffhausen in last place of the league and having won just 20 points in 24 games.

== Career statistics ==
Scores and results list Switzerland's goal tally first, score column indicates score after each Sforza goal.

List of international goals scored by Ciriaco Sforza
No.	Date	Venue	Opponent	Score	Result	Competition
1	16 August 1992	Kadrioru Stadium, Tallinn, Estonia	Estonia	6–0	6–0	1994 FIFA World Cup qualification
2	18 November 1992	Wankdorf Stadium, Bern, Switzerland	Malta	3–0	3–0	1994 FIFA World Cup qualification
3	9 March 1994	Népstadion, Budapest, Hungary	Hungary	1–0	2–1	Friendly
4	12 October 1994	Wankdorf Stadium, Bern, Switzerland	Sweden	3–2	4–2	UEFA Euro 1996 qualifying
5	11 October 1995	Hardturm, Zürich, Switzerland	Hungary	2–0	3–0	UEFA Euro 1996 qualifying
6	13 March 1996	Stade Josy Barthel, Luxembourg, Luxembourg	Luxembourg	1–1	1–1	Friendly
7	6 October 1996	Olympiastadion, Helsinki, Finland	Finland	2–0	3–2	1998 FIFA World Cup qualification

== Managerial statistics ==
As of 4 March 2025

Managerial record by team and tenure
Team	Nat	From	To	Record								Ref
Team	Nat	From	To	G	W	D	L	GF	GA	GD	Win %	Ref
Luzern	(Switzerland)	8 June 2006	10 August 2008	86	25	24	37	102	122	−20	29.07	
Grasshopper	(Switzerland)	9 June 2009	15 April 2012	111	45	17	49	175	156	+19	40.54	
Wohlen	(Switzerland)	16 February 2014	21 June 2015	55	28	8	19	88	68	+20	50.91	
Thun	(Switzerland)	21 June 2015	30 September 2015	18	5	5	8	26	31	−5	27.78	
Wil	(Switzerland)	1 April 2019	26 August 2020	48	16	11	21	71	81	−10	33.33	
Basel	(Switzerland)	26 August 2020	6 April 2021	31	12	6	13	48	52	−4	38.71	
Schaffhausen	(Switzerland)	14 June 2024	4 March 2025	27	7	5	15	30	44	−14	25.93	
Total				349	131	71	147	510	510	+0	37.54	—

== Honours ==
=== Player ===
Grasshopper Club Zürich

- Swiss Super League: 1990–91

Bayern Munich

- Bundesliga: 2000–01
- UEFA Champions League: 2000–01
- UEFA Cup: 1995–96
- Intercontinental Cup: 2001

Inter Milan

- UEFA Cup runners-up: 1996–97

1. FC Kaiserslautern

- Bundesliga: 1997–98
