= Andrea Mazzantini =

Italian footballer (born 1968)

Personal information
- Date of birth: 11 July 1968 (age 58)
- Place of birth: La Spezia, Italy
- Height: 1.82 m (6 ft 0 in)
- Position: Goalkeeper

Senior career*
Years	Team	Apps	(Gls)
1987–1988	Pro Patria	10	(0)
1988–1990	Sarzanese	43	(0)
1990–1991	Livorno	7	(0)
1991–1993	Spezia	32	(0)
1993–1996	Venezia	86	(0)
1996–1998	Inter Milan	2	(0)
1998–2002	Perugia	94	(0)
2002–2003	Siena	0	(0)
Total		274	(0)
- * Club domestic league appearances and goals

Andrea Mazzantini (born 11 July 1968) is an Italian former professional footballer who played as a goalkeeper.

== Career ==
Mazzantini started his career with amateur club Canaletto under Adriano Buffon, the father of Italian goalkeeper Gianluigi Buffon.

After playing six seasons between Serie C2 and Serie C1, Mazzantini was appointed as a first choice goalkeeper by Venezia chairman, Maurizio Zamparini.

After three seasons spent in Serie B, Mazzantini moved to Inter Milan where he used to be the backup choice of Italy international Gianluca Pagliuca.

He played his first Serie A game in 1996–97, when replaced Pagliuca against Reggiana in the second half. Likewise, he played his second and last game with Inter in the final match of season 1997-98 against Empoli.

In January 1999 he moved to Perugia where he played three seasons and half under Serse Cosmi, prior to move to Serie B side Siena at the beginning of the 2002–03 season. However, he did not manage to make an appearance with them as he suffered a car accident and was forced to an early retirement.

== Honours ==
Inter Milan

- UEFA Cup: 1997–98
