= Ingo Anderbrügge =

German footballer (born 1964)

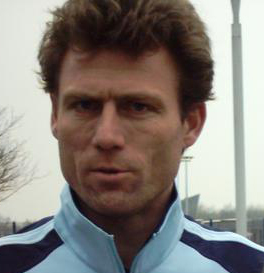
- Anderbrügge

Personal information
- Full name: Ingo Anderbrügge
- Date of birth: 2 January 1964 (age 62)
- Place of birth: Datteln, West Germany
- Height: 1.89 m (6 ft 2 in)
- Position: Midfielder

Youth career
- 1970–1980: Germania Datteln
- 1980–1983: SpVgg Erkenschwick

Senior career*
Years	Team	Apps	(Gls)
1983–1984	SpVgg Erkenschwick		
1984–1988	Borussia Dortmund	76	(7)
1988–1999	Schalke 04	316	(82)
2000–2001	Sportfreunde Siegen	19	(5)
Total		411	(94)

International career
1985	West Germany U21	3	(0)

Managerial career
- 2005: Werner SC 2000
- 2005–2006: SpVgg Erkenschwick
- 2006–2007: VfB Hüls
- 2007–2008: Wacker Burghausen
- * Club domestic league appearances and goals

Ingo Anderbrügge (German: [ˈɪŋɡoː ˈʔandɐbʁʏɡə]; born 2 January 1964) is a German former professional footballer who played mostly as an attacking midfielder.

== Football career ==
Anderbrügge was born in Datteln. He started playing professionally with Borussia Dortmund, making his Bundesliga debut on 7 July 1984, in a 2–3 home loss against Borussia Mönchengladbach. After a final poor season, in 1987–88, he moved to FC Schalke 04, then in the second division. In his first three years, he netted a total of 36 league goals, eventually gaining promotion in 1991.

A regular fixture on the team during the next six years, with the UEFA Cup conquest in 1996–97, his only professional accolade (he netted his penalty shootout attempt in the final against F.C. Internazionale Milano), Anderbrügge could only manage however 33 appearances from 1997 to 2000, and retired after a brief spell with Sportfreunde Siegen, in the third level, having totalled 53 goals in 292 first division contests (397/89 in all three levels).

In March 2008, Anderbrügge began his professional manager career, in the same division where he finished his playing activity, with SV Wacker Burghausen – he had previously managed amateurs SpVgg Erkenschwick and VfB Hüls in Westphalia.

== Other ventures ==
After retiring as a player, and before he started coaching, Anderbrügge played two seasons as a placekicker for NFL Europe team Rhein Fire.

He also founded a football school and, in March 2009, was appointed technical director of the Deutsches Fußball Internat, a boarding school for youths.

Anderbrügge currently works as a pundit and analyst for German TV channel Sport1.

== Honours ==
Schalke 04

- UEFA Cup: 1996–97
