= Marc Wilmots =

Belgian footballer and politician

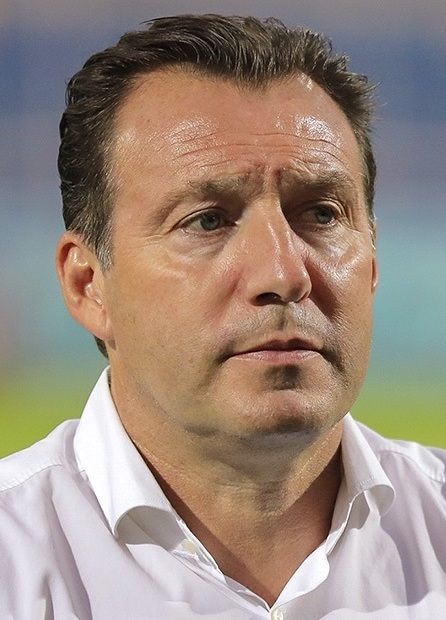
- Wilmots in 2019

Senator
- In office 5 June 2003 – 12 July 2007
- Constituency: French-speaking electoral college

Personal details
- Born: 22 February 1969 (age 57) Dongelberg, Jodoigne, Province of Brabant, Belgium
- Party: Mouvement Réformateur
Association football career
- Height: 1.84 m (6 ft 0 in)
- Position: Attacking midfielder
Team information
- Current team: Standard Liège (sporting director)
Youth career
- 1980–1985: CS Jodoigne
- 1985–1987: Sint-Truiden
Senior career*
Years	Team	Apps	(Gls)
1987–1988	Sint-Truiden	30	(9)
1988–1991	Mechelen	87	(22)
1991–1996	Standard Liège	136	(67)
1996–2000	Schalke 04	104	(21)
2000–2001	Bordeaux	30	(8)
2001–2003	Schalke 04	34	(6)
Total		421	(133)
International career
1986–1987	Belgium U19	9	(3)
1987–1989	Belgium U21	9	(6)
1990–2002	Belgium	70	(28)
Managerial career
- 2003: Schalke 04 (caretaker)
- 2004–2005: Sint-Truiden
- 2012–2016: Belgium
- 2017: Ivory Coast
- 2019: Iran
- 2021–2022: Raja CA
- * Club domestic league appearances and goals

Marc Wilmots (maʁk ˈʋɪl.mɔts; born 22 February 1969) is a Belgian professional football manager and former player who is the sporting director of Standard Liège.

During his club career as an attacking midfielder, he won trophies with KV Mechelen, Standard Liège and Schalke 04. He represented the Belgium national team, earning 70 caps. He was in the Belgium squad for the 1990, 1994, 1998 and 2002 World Cups, as well as the 2000 Euro which Belgium hosted jointly with the Netherlands.

Wilmots has also been a politician, having sat in the Senate for four years for the Mouvement Réformateur party.

== Early life ==
Wilmots was born on 22 February 1969 in Dongelberg, Jodoigne, Province of Brabant, where he was raised.

== Club career ==
In his club career, which started in 1987, Wilmots played for Sint-Truiden, Mechelen, Standard Liège, Schalke 04, and Bordeaux. At Schalke, he helped them to the 1997 UEFA Cup final. His goal in the first leg was cancelled out by Internazionale in the second leg, but Schalke went on to win the game on penalties, with Wilmots scoring the decisive goal. He retired in 2003, after his second stint with Schalke. During his time with Schalke, the fans there gave him the affectionate nickname "Das Kampfschwein" (The War Pig), which has been picked up by some English language journalists. In Belgium he is known under the nickname the Bull of Dongelberg, an allusion to his birthplace.

== International career ==
For Belgium, Wilmots scored 28 goals in 70 caps, his first coming in May 1990. He went to four World Cups, playing in three. After being an unused substitute in 1990, he played 54 minutes in 1994 without scoring, but scored two goals in 1998 and three in 2002, making him Belgium's leading goal scorer in World Cup history. He also scored a goal against Brazil in the last 16 match of the 2002 World Cup which was disallowed because of a "phantom foul" on Roque Júnior. According to Wilmots, the referee Peter Prendergast apologized for the error to him at half time. Wilmots was named as one of the seven reserves in the 2002 World Cup All-Star Team.

Wilmots also played in Euro 2000, when Belgium co-hosted the tournament.

== Managerial career ==
Wilmots became a football manager in summer 2004 for Sint-Truiden, but was sacked in February 2005. Between 2009 and 2012, he served as assistant manager of the Belgium national team under Dick Advocaat and later Georges Leekens. On 15 May 2012, following the exit of Leekens, Wilmots assumed the Belgium reins on an interim basis before going onto become permanent coach, signing a contract until June 2014.

On 11 October 2013, Belgium qualified for the 2014 FIFA World Cup. Wilmots is credited with "not only giving the young group confidence in themselves as well as enjoying a close relationship with his players but also at the same time being capable of instilling discipline to the squad." During the group stage, Belgium topped the group with all three wins, before exiting the tournament at the quarter-final stage.

On 13 October 2015, Belgium won the group to qualify for the UEFA Euro 2016 in the last game of the stage against Israel. After a disappointing European Championship, Wilmots was fired by the Royal Belgian Football Association on 15 July 2016.

In March 2017 Wilmots was appointed as the manager of Ivory Coast national team. However he was sacked from his position six months later after failing to qualify for the World Cup.

On 15 May 2019, Wilmots agreed a three years contract to become the manager of the Iranian national team, after Portuguese coach Carlos Queiroz left the team after eight years in charge following Iran's semifinal exit in the Asian Cup. He officially signed his contract on 29 May, effective from 1 June 2019. On 4 December 2019, following shock defeats to both Iraq and Bahrain he left his role as Iran coach after six games in charge.

On 11 November 2021, Moroccan team Raja CA announced that Wilmots would be their new head coach until 2024, succeeding Lassaad Chabbi. Wilmots was sacked three months later by Raja on 21 February 2022.

On 3 January 2024, Schalke 04 announced that Wilmots became the sporting director of the club. On 21 September 2024, after a 5–3 loss to Darmstadt 98 and with Schalke in the relegation play-offs, Wilmots was dismissed.

== Political career ==
After retiring as a footballer, Wilmots went into politics. He was elected to the Senate for the French-speaking conservative party, the Reformist Movement (Mouvement Réformateur or MR) in the 2003 federal election. He received 79,437 votes, a number surpassed only by 17 other candidates in the whole country during the elections.

In 2005, he announced that he wanted to resign as a senator, a rather unconventional and criticized constitutional move.

== Career statistics ==
=== Club ===
Appearances and goals by club, season and competition
Club	Season	League		Cup		League Cup		Europe		Total	
Club	Season	Apps	Goals	Apps	Goals	Apps	Goals	Apps	Goals	Apps	Goals
Sint-Truiden	1987–88	30	9	0	0	0	0	1	0	31	9
Mechelen	1988–89	30	4	0	0	0	0	6	2	36	6
Mechelen	1989–90	25	10	0	0	0	0	4	0	29	10
Mechelen	1990–91	32	8	0	0	0	0	2	0	34	8
Mechelen	Total	87	22	0	0	0	0	12	2	99	24
Standard Liège	1991–92	33	10	0	0	0	0	0	0	33	10
Standard Liège	1992–93	25	22	0	0	0	0	6	2	31	24
Standard Liège	1993–94	28	11	0	0	0	0	4	3	32	14
Standard Liège	1994–95	24	10	0	0	0	0	0	0	24	10
Standard Liège	1995–96	26	14	0	0	0	0	0	0	26	14
Standard Liège	Total	136	67	0	0	0	0	10	5	146	72
Schalke 04	1996–97	29	6	2	1	0	0	11	6	42	13
Schalke 04	1997–98	31	7	2	1	0	0	7	2	40	10
Schalke 04	1998–99	12	1	1	0	0	0	2	1	15	2
Schalke 04	1999–2000	32	7	2	0	0	0	0	0	34	7
Schalke 04	Total	104	21	7	2	0	0	20	9	131	32
Bordeaux	2000–01	30	8	2	1	1	0	5	2	38	11
Schalke 04	2001–02	24	6	6	0	0	0	3	0	33	6
Schalke 04	2002–03	10	0	1	0	0	0	3	1	14	1
Schalke 04	Total	34	6	7	0	0	0	6	1	47	7
Career total		421	133	16	3	1	0	54	19	492	155

=== International ===
Appearances and goals by national team and year
National team	Year	Apps	Goals
Belgium	1990	4	0
Belgium	1991	6	0
Belgium	1992	7	4
Belgium	1993	3	4
Belgium	1994	4	0
Belgium	1995	0	0
Belgium	1996	1	0
Belgium	1997	3	1
Belgium	1998	9	4
Belgium	1999	6	3
Belgium	2000	9	2
Belgium	2001	9	6
Belgium	2002	9	4
Total		70	28

Scores and results list Belgium's goal tally first, score column indicates score after each Wilmots goal.

List of international goals scored by Marc Wilmots
No.	Date	Venue	Opponent	Score	Result	Competition
1	25 March 1992	Parc des Princes, Paris, France	France	3–2	3–3	Friendly
2	22 April 1992	Constant Vanden Stock Stadium, Brussels, Belgium	Cyprus	1–0	1–0	1994 World Cup qualification
3	3 June 1992	Svangaskarð, Toftir, Iceland	Faroe Islands	2–0	3–0	1994 World Cup qualification
4	3 June 1992	Svangaskarð, Toftir, Iceland	Faroe Islands	3–0	3–0	1994 World Cup qualification
5	22 May 1993	Constant Vanden Stock Stadium, Brussels, Belgium	Faroe Islands	1–0	3–0	1994 World Cup qualification
6	22 May 1993	Constant Vanden Stock Stadium, Brussels, Belgium	Faroe Islands	3–0	3–0	1994 World Cup qualification
7	6 October 1993	Constant Vanden Stock Stadium, Brussels, Belgium	Gabon	1–1	2–1	Friendly
8	6 October 1993	Constant Vanden Stock Stadium, Brussels, Belgium	Gabon	2–1	2–1	Friendly
9	11 October 1997	King Baudouin Stadium, Brussels, Belgium	Wales	3–0	3–2	1998 World Cup qualification
10	25 March 1998	King Baudouin Stadium, Brussels, Belgium	Norway	2–1	2–2	Friendly
11	3 June 1998	King Baudouin Stadium, Brussels, Belgium	Colombia	2–0	2–0	Friendly
12	20 June 1998	Stade Chaban-Delmas, Bordeaux, France	Mexico	1–0	2–2	1998 World Cup
13	20 June 1998	Stade Chaban-Delmas, Bordeaux, France	Mexico	2–0	2–2	1998 World Cup
14	18 August 1999	Jan Breydel Stadium, Bruges, Belgium	Finland	2–3	3–4	Friendly
15	4 September 1999	De Kuip, Rotterdam, Netherlands	Netherlands	4–3	5–5	Friendly
16	13 November 1999	Stadio Via del Mare, Lecce, Italy	Italy	2–1	3–1	Friendly
17	3 June 2000	Parken Stadium, Copenhagen, Denmark	Denmark	2–2	2–2	Friendly
18	7 October 2000	Skonto Stadium, Riga, Latvia	Latvia	1–0	4–0	2002 World Cup qualification
19	28 February 2001	King Baudouin Stadium, Brussels, Belgium	San Marino	7–0	10–1	2002 World Cup qualification
20	24 March 2001	Hampden Park, Glasgow, Scotland	Scotland	1–2	2–2	2002 World Cup qualification
21	2 June 2001	King Baudouin Stadium, Brussels, Belgium	Latvia	1–0	3–1	2002 World Cup qualification
22	6 June 2001	Stadio Olimpico, Serravalle, San Marino	San Marino	1–0	4–1	2002 World Cup qualification
23	6 June 2001	Stadio Olimpico, Serravalle, San Marino	San Marino	4–1	4–1	2002 World Cup qualification
24	14 November 2001	Letna Stadium, Prague, Czech Republic	Czech Republic	1–0	1–0	2002 World Cup qualification
25	18 May 2002	Stade de France, Saint-Denis, France	France	2–1	2–1	Friendly
26	4 June 2002	Saitama Stadium 2002, Saitama, Japan	Japan	1–0	2–2	2002 World Cup
27	10 June 2002	Ōita Big Eye Stadium, Ōita, Japan	Tunisia	1–0	1–1	2002 World Cup
28	14 June 2002	Shizuoka Ecopa Stadium, Shizuoka, Japan	Russia	3–1	3–2	2002 World Cup

== Managerial statistics ==
As of match played 18 February 2022

Team	From	To	Competition	Record							
Team	From	To	Competition	G	W	D	L	GF	GA	GD	Win %
Schalke 04	26 March 2003	30 June 2003	Bundesliga	8	3	1	4	10	10	+0	37.50
Schalke 04	26 March 2003	30 June 2003	Total	8	3	1	4	10	10	+0	37.50
Sint-Truiden	1 July 2004	20 February 2005	Belgian Pro League	20	5	5	10	23	35	−12	25.00
Sint-Truiden	1 July 2004	20 February 2005	Belgian Cup	2	0	1	1	2	3	−1	0.00
Sint-Truiden	1 July 2004	20 February 2005	Total	22	5	6	11	25	38	−13	22.73
Belgium	15 May 2012	15 July 2016	Competitive	30	22	4	4	57	17	+40	73.33
Belgium	15 May 2012	15 July 2016	Friendlies	20	10	4	6	37	29	+8	50.00
Belgium	15 May 2012	15 July 2016	Total	50	32	8	10	94	46	+48	64.00
Ivory Coast	21 March 2017	15 November 2017	Competitive	4	1	1	2	4	4	+0	25.00
Ivory Coast	21 March 2017	15 November 2017	Friendlies	2	0	1	1	1	6	−5	0.00
Ivory Coast	21 March 2017	15 November 2017	Total	6	1	2	3	5	10	−5	16.67
Iran	1 June 2019	6 December 2019	Competitive	4	2	0	2	17	3	+14	50.00
Iran	1 June 2019	6 December 2019	Friendlies	2	1	1	0	6	1	+5	50.00
Iran	1 June 2019	6 December 2019	Total	6	3	1	2	23	4	+19	50.00
Raja CA	11 November 2021	21 February 2022	Botola	7	2	4	1	8	7	+1	28.57
Raja CA	11 November 2021	21 February 2022	CAF Champions League	2	2	0	0	2	0	+2	100.00
Raja CA	11 November 2021	21 February 2022	CAF Super Cup	1	0	1	0	1	1	+0	0.00
Raja CA	11 November 2021	21 February 2022	Total	10	4	5	1	11	8	+3	40.00
Career totals			League	35	10	10	15	41	52	−11	28.57
Career totals			Cup	2	0	1	1	2	3	−1	0.00
Career totals			Continental	3	2	1	0	3	1	+2	66.67
Career totals			Competitive	38	25	5	8	78	24	+54	65.79
Career totals			Friendlies	24	11	6	7	44	36	+8	45.83
Career totals			Total	102	48	23	31	168	116	+52	47.06

== Honours ==
=== Player ===
KV Mechelen

- Belgian First Division: 1988–89
- Amsterdam Tournament: 1989
- Jules Pappaert Cup: 1990
- European Super Cup: 1988

Standard Liège

- Belgian Cup: 1992–93
- UEFA Intertoto Cup: runner-up 1996

Schalke 04

- DFB-Pokal: 2001–02
- UEFA Cup: 1996–97

Belgium

- FIFA Fair Play Trophy: 2002 World Cup

Individual

- Young Professional Footballer of the Year: 1989–90
- Kicker German Football Rankings - International Class Player: 1997–98, 2001-02
- Best Belgian Footballer Abroad: 2001, 2002
- Belgian Sports Merit Award: 2002
- Golden Shoe Lifetime Achievement Award: 2002

Records

- 4 FIFA World Cup participations: 1990, 1994, 1998, 2002

=== Manager ===
Individual

- Belgian Sports Coach of the Year: 2013, 2014
- Raymond Goethals Award: 2015
- Globe Soccer Awards Best Coach of the Year: 2015

== See also ==
- List of FIFA World Cup top goalscorers
