= Mathias Schober =

German former professional footballer (born 1976)

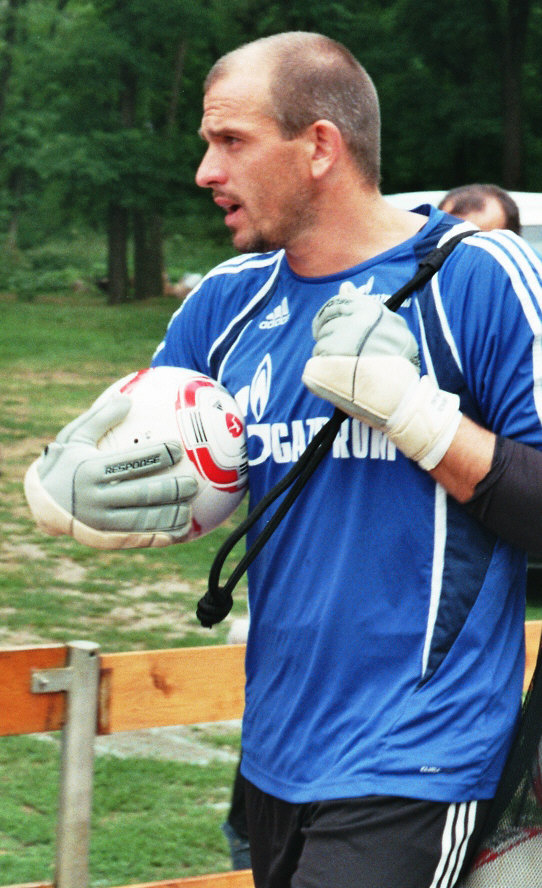
- Schober training with Schalke 04 in 2010

Personal information
- Date of birth: 8 April 1976 (age 50)
- Place of birth: Marl, West Germany
- Height: 1.91 m (6 ft 3 in)
- Position: Goalkeeper

Youth career
- 1984–1986: Germania Lenkerbeck
- 1986–1988: TuS 05 Sinsen
- 1988–1990: SpVgg Marl
- 1990–1994: Schalke 04

Senior career*
Years	Team	Apps	(Gls)
1994–2001	Schalke 04	25	(0)
2000–2001	→ Hamburger SV (loan)	3	(0)
2001–2007	Hansa Rostock	191	(0)
2007–2012	Schalke 04	5	(0)
Total		224	(0)
- * Club domestic league appearances and goals

Mathias Schober (born 8 April 1976) is a German former professional footballer who played as a goalkeeper. Schober is currently the director of Development at Schalke.

He appeared in 156 Bundesliga games during 16 seasons, with Schalke 04 (11 years) and Hansa Rostock (four).

== Football career ==
Born in Marl, North Rhine-Westphalia, Schober started his professional career with FC Schalke 04 in 1994 and stayed there for six years, during which he was mainly barred by legendary Jens Lehmann. After the latter's departure for A.C. Milan he again played second-fiddle, now to Oliver Reck, but did manage 24 Bundesliga appearances from 1998 to 2000 combined.

After an unassuming spell at Hamburger SV, Schober settled in at F.C. Hansa Rostock where he was first-choice in five of his six seasons (only missing one match combined), two of those spent in the second division. He then rejoined Schalke at the beginning of the 2007–08 campaign, where he again backed up, now Manuel Neuer.

While playing with Hamburg, Schober was involved in the climax of 2000–01, in the final match of the season against FC Bayern Munich: the Bavarians needed at least a point to win the title over Schalke, his first team, but Hamburg took the lead in the 90th minute through Sergej Barbarez, only for Schober to immediately pick up a back pass from his teammate Tomáš Ujfaluši, thus giving Bayern an indirect free kick in his penalty area – Patrik Andersson smashed it home to win Bayern the title in dramatic fashion. He retired in June 2012 after his second spell in Gelsenkirchen, aged 36.

== Career statistics ==
Appearances and goals by club, season and competition
Club	Season	League			Cup		Continental		Total	
Club	Season	Division	Apps	Goals	Apps	Goals	Apps	Goals	Apps	Goals
Schalke 04	1996–97	Bundesliga	1	0	0	0	0	0	1	0
Schalke 04	1997–98	Bundesliga	0	0	0	0	1	0	1	0
Schalke 04	1998–99	Bundesliga	14	0	1	0	2	0	17	0
Schalke 04	1999–00	Bundesliga	10	0	1	0	0	0	11	0
Schalke 04	Total		25	0	2	0	3	0	30	0
Hamburger SV	2000–01	Bundesliga	3	0	0	0	0	0	3	0
Hansa Rostock	2001–02	Bundesliga	22	0	1	0	0	0	23	0
Hansa Rostock	2002–03	Bundesliga	34	0	3	0	0	0	37	0
Hansa Rostock	2003–04	Bundesliga	33	0	2	0	0	0	35	0
Hansa Rostock	2004–05	Bundesliga	34	0	4	0	0	0	38	0
Hansa Rostock	2005–06	2. Bundesliga	34	0	3	0	0	0	37	0
Hansa Rostock	2006–07	2. Bundesliga	34	0	1	0	0	0	35	0
Hansa Rostock	Total		191	0	14	0	0	0	205	0
Schalke 04	2007–08	Bundesliga	0	0	0	0	0	0	0	0
Schalke 04	2008–09	Bundesliga	4	0	1	0	2	0	7	0
Schalke 04	2009–10	Bundesliga	0	0	0	0	0	0	0	0
Schalke 04	2010–11	Bundesliga	0	0	0	0	0	0	0	0
Schalke 04	2011–12	Bundesliga	1	0	0	0	1	0	2	0
Schalke 04	Total		5	0	1	0	3	0	9	0
Career total			224	0	17	0	6	0	247	0

== Honours ==
Schalke 04

- DFB-Pokal: 2010–11
- UEFA Cup: 1996–97
- DFL-Ligapokal: Runner-up 2007
