= Parkstadion =

Stadium in Germany

Coordinates: 51°33′33″N 7°04′00″E

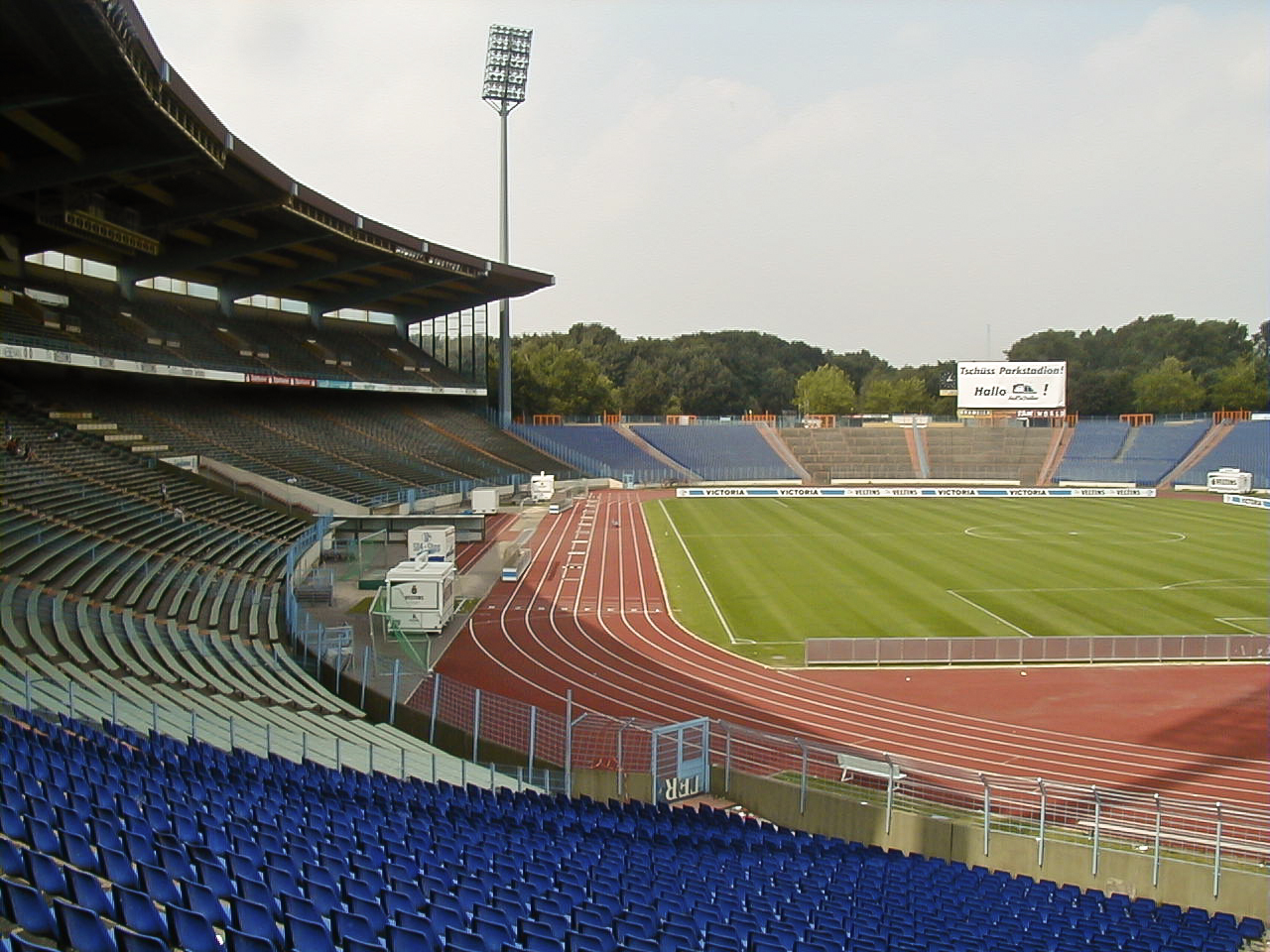
- Parkstadion, Gelsenkirchen, Deutschland
- Interactive map of Parkstadion
- Location: Gelsenkirchen, Germany
- Capacity: 62,004 (league matches); 55,877 (international matches)
- Surface: Grass

Construction
- Groundbreaking: 29 August 1969
- Opened: 4 August 1973
- Renovated: 1998
- Closed: 2008

Tenant
- FC Schalke 04 (1973–2001)

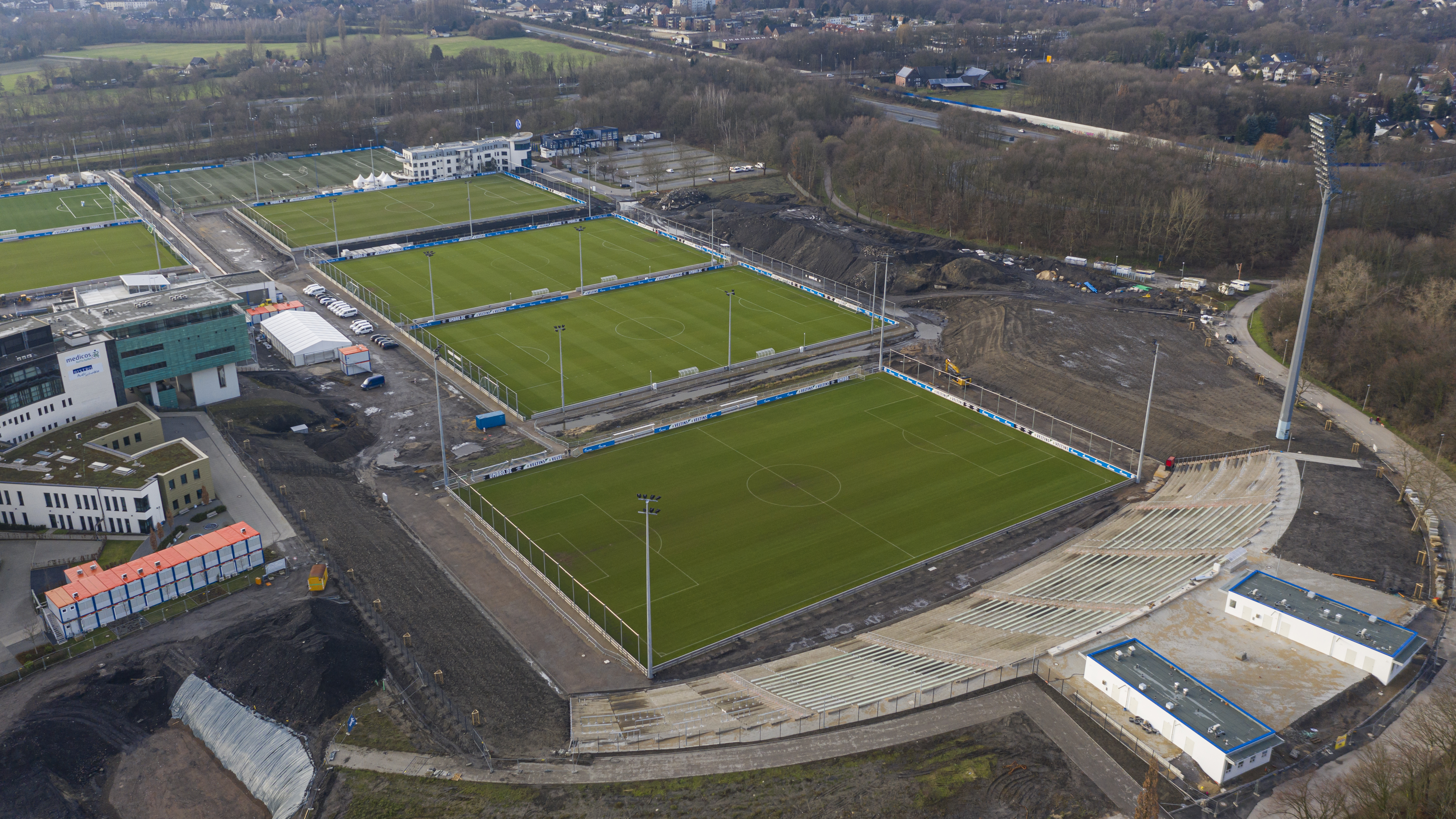
Parkstadion in 2024

Parkstadion (German pronunciation: [ˈpaʁkˌʃtaːdi̯ɔn]) is a multi-purpose stadium in Gelsenkirchen, North Rhine-Westphalia, Germany, that is no longer used to host any major events. The stadium was built in 1973 and hosted five matches of the 1974 FIFA World Cup. It had a capacity of 62,004 seats.

During the 1974 FIFA World Cup, Yugoslavia set the record for the biggest ever win at a FIFA World Cup with a 9–0 hammering of Zaire.

Michael Jackson performed at the stadium during his Bad World Tour on 4 September 1988 and during his HIStory World Tour on 15 June 1997. He was also scheduled to perform at the stadium on 6 September 1992 on his Dangerous World Tour, but cancelled due to ill health.

The Rolling Stones performed at the stadium during their Urban Jungle Tour on 16 August 1990 and during their Bridges To Babylon Tour on 27 July 1998.

Pink Floyd performed at the stadium during The Division Bell Tour on 23 August 1994.

It was the home ground of football club FC Schalke 04 until May 2001, before the newly built and adjacent Arena AufSchalke opened in July of the same year.

The stadium hosted two UEFA Euro 1988 fixtures (West Germany against Denmark, and the Netherlands against the Republic of Ireland), as well as the first leg of the 1997 UEFA Cup final between Schalke and Internazionale.

The last competitive football match played in the stadium was a 2000–01 Bundesliga fixture between Schalke and SpVgg Unterhaching on 19 May 2001. The match was attended by approximately 65,000 people. At the end of the match, after a difficult 5–3 win, and thanks to a last minute goal scored by Hamburger SV against Bayern Munich, the crowd celebrated Schalke 04's first Bundesliga title before Patrik Andersson equalized in the additional time for Bayern, retaining the title for Bayern and shocking the Schalke fans in the Parkstadion.

The stadium is now partly demolished and the Jumbotron that was placed atop the northern stand was donated to Erzgebirgsstadion in Aue, where it was installed during the renovations of the stadium in 2004.

In an article from May 2026, The Mirror UK detailed the history, partial demolition and partial reconstruction as part of Schalke's Under-23 youth academy campus with a reduced capacity of 2,999 seats.
