= List of Inter Milan managers =

Football Club Internazionale Milano is an Italian association football club based in Milan, Lombardy. The club was formed on 9 March 1908 to allow the foreign players to play in Italy. Inter played its first competitive match on 10 January 1910 against their cross-town rivals Milan, in which they lost 3–2. The club won its first title in 1910 – the 1909–10 Italian Football Championship. In total, the club has won 21 league titles along with ten Coppa Italia and eight Supercoppa Italiana. They have also been crowned champions of Europe on three occasions by winning two European Cups back-to-back in 1964 and 1965 and then another in 2010. The club experienced the most successful period in their history from 2006 to 2010, in which it won five successive league titles, equaling the all-time record at that time, by adding three Italian Cups, three Italian Supercups, one UEFA Champions League and one FIFA Club World Cup. During the 2009–10 season, Inter under José Mourinho become the first and only Italian team to win the Treble and the second team to win five trophies in a calendar year.

Helenio Herrera and Roberto Mancini are the most successful managers in terms of number of trophies won. Helenio Herrera won three Serie A titles, two European Cups and two Intercontinental Cups. Herrera is also the club's longest-serving manager with nine seasons, eight of which were consecutive. Roberto Mancini won three Serie A titles, two Coppa Italia and two Supercoppa Italiana.

== List of managers ==
Manager	Nationality	Years
Virgilio Fossati	Italy	1909–1915
Nino Resegotti; Francesco Mauro	Italy	1919–1920
Bob Spottiswood	England	1922–1924
Paolo Scheidler	Italy	1924–1926
Árpád Weisz	Hungary	1926–1928
József Viola	Hungary	1928–1929
Árpád Weisz	Hungary	1929–1931
István Tóth	Hungary	1931–1932
Árpád Weisz	Hungary	1932–1934
Gyula Feldmann	Hungary	1934–1936
Albino Carraro	Italy	1936
Armando Castellazzi	Italy	1936–1938
Tony Cargnelli	Austria	1938–1940
Giuseppe Peruchetti; Italo Zamberletti	Italy	1940–1941
Ivo Fiorentini	Italy	1941–1942
Giovanni Ferrari	Italy	1942–1943
Carlo Carcano	Italy	1945–1946
Nino Nutrizio	Italy	1946
Giuseppe Meazza	Italy	1947–1948
Carlo Carcano	Italy	1948
Dai Astley	Wales	1948
Giulio Cappelli	Italy	1949–1950
Aldo Olivieri	Italy	1950–1952
Alfredo Foni	Italy	1952–1955
Aldo Campatelli	Italy	1955
Giuseppe Meazza	Italy	1955–1956
Annibale Frossi	Italy	1956
Luigi Ferrero	Italy	1957
Giuseppe Meazza	Italy	1957
Jesse Carver	England	1957–1958
Giuseppe Bigogno	Italy	1958
Aldo Campatelli	Italy	1959–1960
Camillo Achilli	Italy	1960
Giulio Cappelli	Italy	1960
Helenio Herrera	Argentina	1960–1968
Alfredo Foni	Italy	1968–1969
Heriberto Herrera	Paraguay	1969–1971
Giovanni Invernizzi	Italy	1971–1973
Enea Masiero	Italy	1973
Helenio Herrera	Argentina	1973
Enea Masiero	Italy	1974

Manager	Nationality	Years
Luis Suárez	Spain	1974–1975
Giuseppe Chiappella	Italy	1976–1977
Eugenio Bersellini	Italy	1977–1982
Rino Marchesi	Italy	1982–1983
Luigi Radice	Italy	1983–1984
Ilario Castagner	Italy	1984–1986
Mario Corso	Italy	1986
Giovanni Trapattoni	Italy	1986–1991
Corrado Orrico	Italy	1991
Luis Suárez	Spain	1992
Osvaldo Bagnoli	Italy	1992–1994
Gianpiero Marini	Italy	1994
Ottavio Bianchi	Italy	1994–1995
Luis Suárez	Spain	1995
Roy Hodgson	England	1995–1997
Luciano Castellini	Italy	1997
Luigi Simoni	Italy	1997–1998
Mircea Lucescu	Romania	1998–1999
Luciano Castellini	Italy	1999
Roy Hodgson	England	1999
Marcello Lippi	Italy	1999–2000
Marco Tardelli	Italy	2000–2001
Héctor Cúper	Argentina	2001–2003
Corrado Verdelli	Italy	2003
Alberto Zaccheroni	Italy	2003–2004
Roberto Mancini	Italy	2004–2008
José Mourinho	Portugal	2008–2010
Rafael Benítez	Spain	2010
Leonardo	Brazil	2010–2011
Gian Piero Gasperini	Italy	2011
Claudio Ranieri	Italy	2011–2012
Andrea Stramaccioni	Italy	2012–2013
Walter Mazzarri	Italy	2013–2014
Roberto Mancini	Italy	2014–2016
Frank de Boer	Netherlands	2016
Stefano Vecchi	Italy	2016
Stefano Pioli	Italy	2016–2017
Stefano Vecchi	Italy	2017
Luciano Spalletti	Italy	2017–2019
Antonio Conte	Italy	2019–2021
Simone Inzaghi	Italy	2021–2025
Cristian Chivu	Romania	2025–

=== Statistics ===
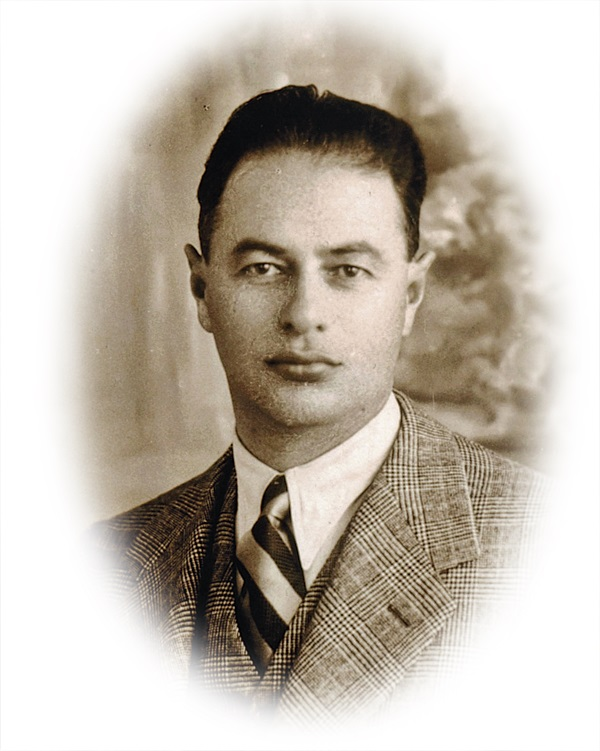
Árpád Weisz, who was later killed at Auschwitz.

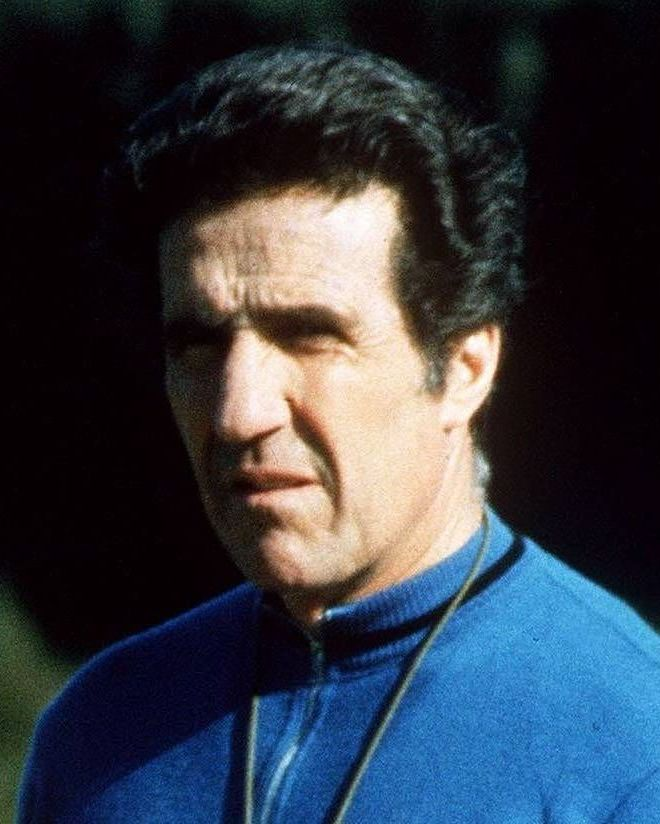
Helenio Herrera won seven trophies with Inter, including the first European Cup for the club history.

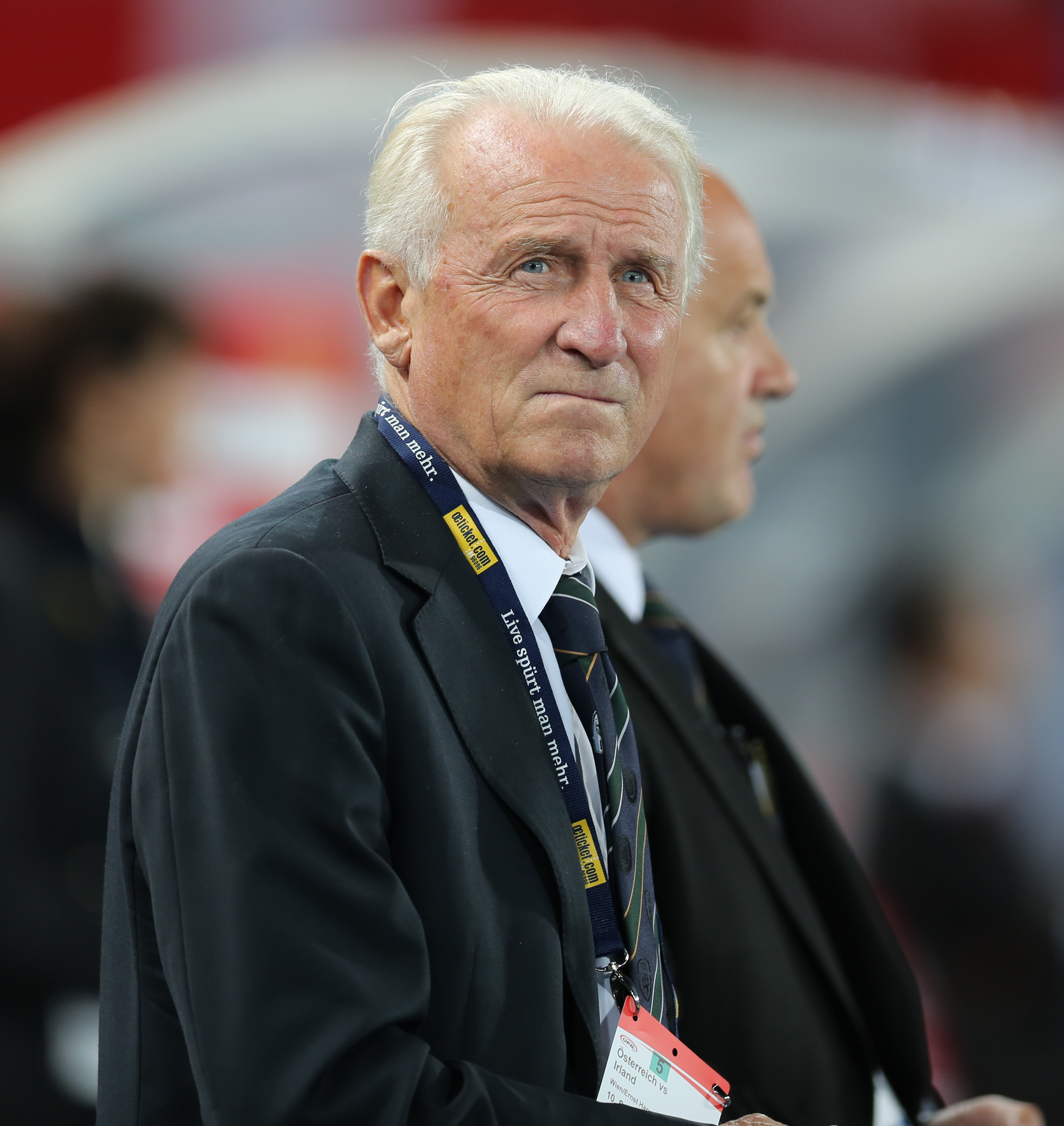
Giovanni Trapattoni won three trophies with Inter.

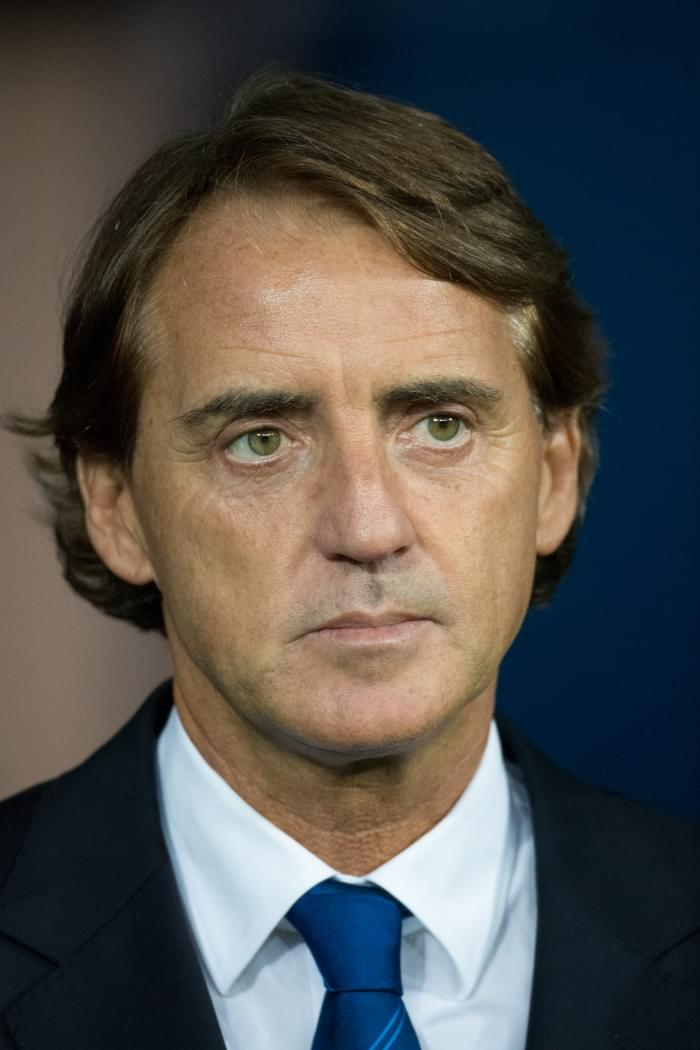
Roberto Mancini won three consecutive Serie A titles with Inter in 2006, 2007 and 2008.

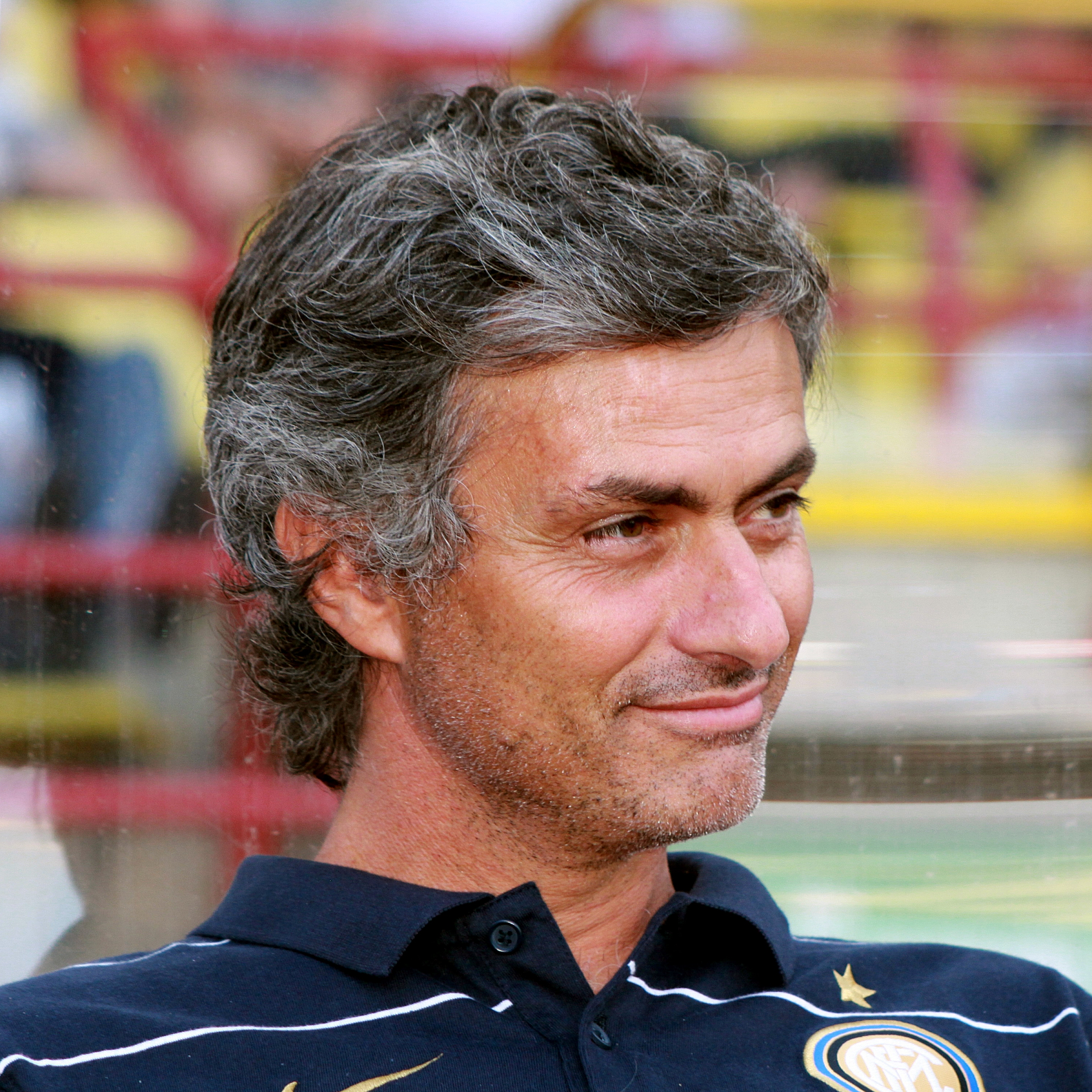
José Mourinho, winner of the first Treble in Italian history in the 2009–10 season.

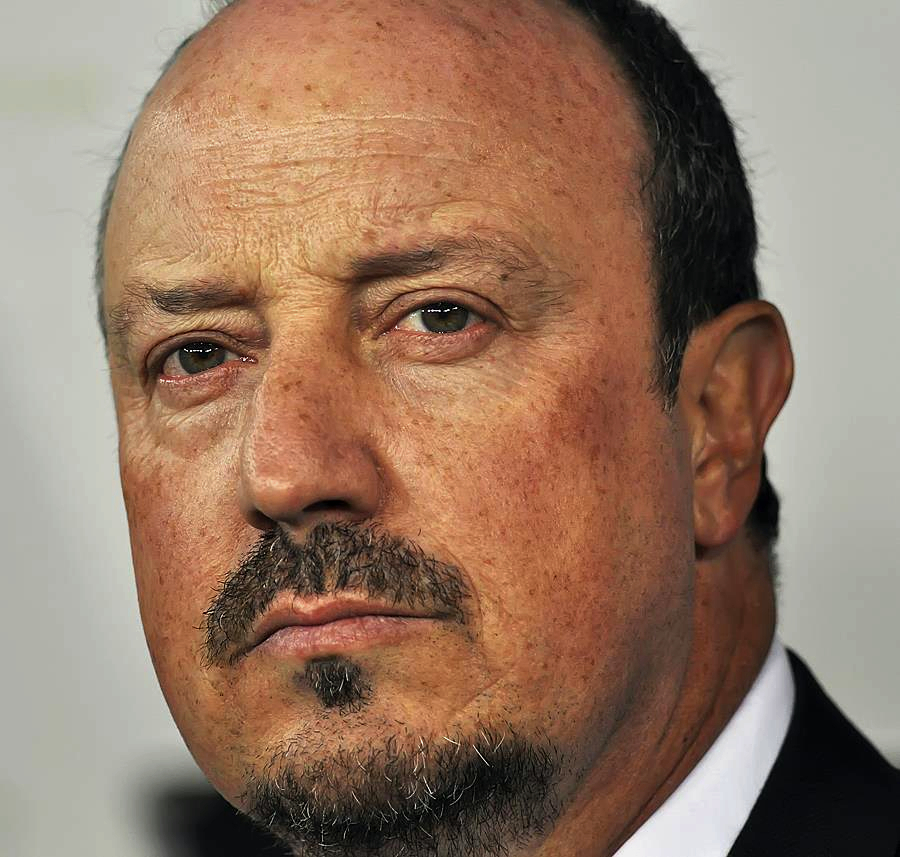
Rafael Benítez won the first FIFA Club World Cup with Inter in 2010.

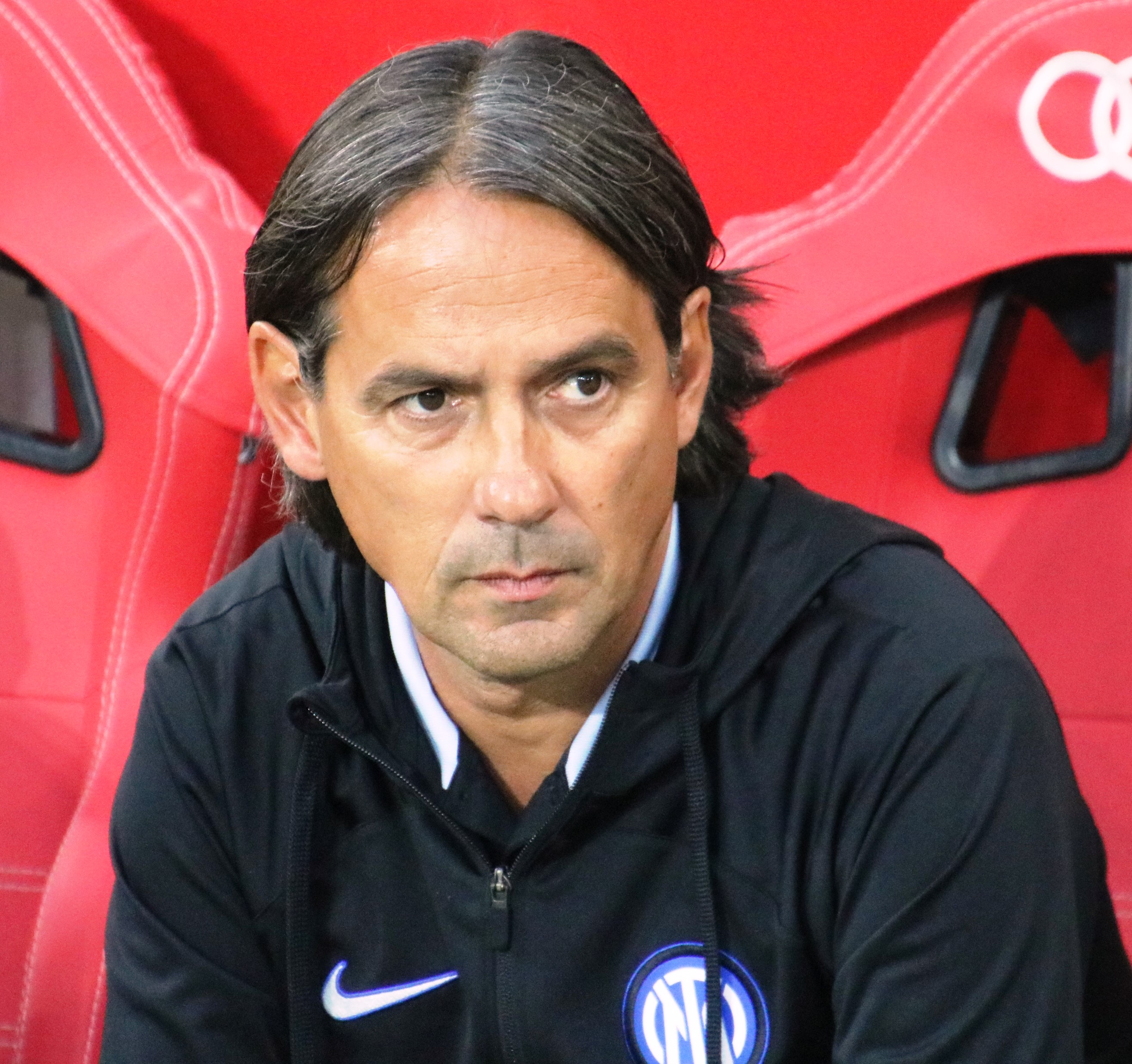
Simone Inzaghi won six trophies with Inter.

As of 8 November 2026.

Manager	Nationality	Seasons	Matches	Wins	Draws	Losses	Win %	PpM
Camillo Achilli	Italy	1	30	11	10	9	36.66%	1.43
Dai Astley	Wales	1	25	12	8	5	48.00%	1.76
Osvaldo Bagnoli	Italy	2	74	36	24	14	48.64%	1.78
Rafael Benítez	Spain	1	25	12	6	7	48.00%	1.68
Eugenio Bersellini	Italy	5	207	92	80	35	44.44%	1.7
Ottavio Bianchi	Italy	2	48	21	12	15	43.75%	1.56
Giuseppe Bigogno	Italy	1	27	16	6	5	59.25%	2
Aldo Campatelli	Italy	3	53	26	11	16	49.05%	1.68
Giulio Cappelli	Italy	3	59	35	14	10	59.32%	2.02
Carlo Carcano	Italy	3	74	31	16	27	41.89%	1.47
Tony Cargnelli	Austria	2	69	40	14	15	57.97%	1.94
Albino Carraro	Italy	1	21	13	5	3	61.90%	2.1
Jesse Carver	England	1	40	13	13	14	32.50%	1.3
Ilario Castagner	Italy	2	70	37	20	13	52.85%	1.87
Armando Castellazzi	Italy	2	72	33	23	16	45.83%	1.69
Luciano Castellini	Italy	2	6	2	2	2	33.33%	1.33
Giuseppe Chiappella	Italy	2	83	38	27	18	45.78%	1.7
Cristian Chivu	Romania	3	73	49	10	14	67.12%	2.15
Antonio Conte	Italy	2	102	64	23	15	62.75%	2.11
Mario Corso	Italy	1	30	13	7	10	43.33%	1.53
Héctor Cúper	Argentina	3	110	57	31	22	51.81%	1.84
Frank de Boer	Netherlands	1	14	5	2	7	35.71%	1.21
Gyula Feldmann	Hungary	2	59	28	20	11	47.45%	1.76
Giovanni Ferrari	Italy	1	31	15	4	12	48.38%	1.58
Luigi Ferrero	Italy	1	23	8	11	4	34.78%	1.52
Ivo Fiorentini	Italy	1	31	7	12	12	22.58%	1.06
Alfredo Foni	Italy	4	141	67	43	31	47.52%	1.73
Virgilio Fossati	Italy	6	110	69	9	32	62.72%	1.96
Annibale Frossi	Italy	1	23	8	11	4	34.78%	1.52
Gian Piero Gasperini	Italy	1	5	0	1	4	0.00%	0.2
Heriberto Herrera	Paraguay	2	56	27	15	14	48.21%	1.71
Helenio Herrera	Argentina	9	360	204	91	65	56.67%	1.95
Roy Hodgson	England	3	89	40	26	23	44.94%	1.64
Giovanni Invernizzi	Italy	3	100	54	26	20	54.00%	1.88
Simone Inzaghi	Italy	4	217	141	41	35	64.98%	2.14
Leonardo	Brazil	1	32	21	4	7	65.63%	2.09
Marcello Lippi	Italy	2	50	25	11	14	50.00%	1.72
Mircea Lucescu	Romania	1	22	7	5	10	31.81%	1.18
Roberto Mancini	Italy	6	303	176	78	49	58.08%	2
Rino Marchesi	Italy	1	47	20	17	10	42.55%	1.64
Gianpiero Marini	Italy	1	18	6	2	10	33.33%	1.11
Enea Masiero	Italy	2	32	15	9	8	46.87%	1.69
Francesco Mauro	Italy	1	23	17	5	1	73.91%	2.43
Walter Mazzarri	Italy	2	58	25	21	12	43.10%	1.66
Giuseppe Meazza	Italy	4	82	37	15	30	45.12%	1.54
José Mourinho	Portugal	2	108	68	25	15	62.96%	2.12
Nino Nutrizio	Italy	1	19	10	3	6	52.63%	1.74
Aldo Olivieri	Italy	2	76	48	13	15	63.15%	2.07
Corrado Orrico	Italy	1	23	8	11	4	34.78%	1.52
Giuseppe Peruchetti	Italy	1	31	14	7	10	45.16%	1.58
Stefano Pioli	Italy	1	27	14	3	10	51.85%	1.67
Luigi Radice	Italy	1	41	16	13	12	39.02%	1.49
Claudio Ranieri	Italy	1	35	17	5	13	48.57%	1.6
Nino Resegotti	Italy	1	23	17	5	1	73.91%	2.43
Paolo Scheidler	Italy	2	44	22	6	16	50.00%	1.64
Luigi Simoni	Italy	2	73	45	12	16	61.64%	2.01
Luciano Spalletti	Italy	2	90	45	26	19	50.00%	1.79
Bob Spottiswood	England	2	47	21	11	15	44.68%	1.57
Andrea Stramaccioni	Italy	2	65	31	11	23	47.69%	1.6
Luis Suárez	Spain	3	76	31	24	21	40.78%	1.54
Marco Tardelli	Italy	1	40	15	13	12	37.50%	1.45
Istvan Toth	Hungary	1	34	15	8	11	44.11%	1.56
Giovanni Trapattoni	Italy	5	230	126	59	45	54.78%	1.9
Stefano Vecchi	Italy	1	5	3	0	2	60.00%	1.8
Corrado Verdelli	Italy	1	1	0	0	1	0.00%	0
József Viola	Hungary	1	25	12	3	10	48.00%	1.56
Árpád Weisz	Hungary	6	212	110	47	55	51.88%	1.78
Alberto Zaccheroni	Italy	1	43	18	14	11	41.86%	1.58
Italo Zamberletti	Italy	1	31	14	7	10	45.16%	1.58

=== Trophies ===
Rank	Manager	SA	CI	SCI	UCL	UEL	IC	FCWC	Total
1	(Argentina) Helenio Herrera	3	–	–	2	–	2	–	7
1	(Italy) Roberto Mancini	3	2	2	–	–	–	–	7
3	(Italy) Simone Inzaghi	1	2	3	–	–	–	–	6
4	(Portugal) José Mourinho	2	1	1	1	–	–	–	5
5	(Italy) Eugenio Bersellini	1	2	–	–	–	–	–	3
5	(Italy) Giovanni Trapattoni	1	–	1	–	1	–	–	3
7	(Spain) Rafael Benítez	–	–	1	–	–	–	1	2
7	(Austria) Tony Cargnelli	1	1	–	–	–	–	–	2
7	(Romania) Cristian Chivu	1	1	–	–	–	–	–	2
7	(Italy) Alfredo Foni	2	–	–	–	–	–	–	2
11	(Italy) Armando Castellazzi	1	–	–	–	–	–	–	1
11	(Italy) Antonio Conte	1	–	–	–	–	–	–	1
11	(Italy) Virgilio Fossati	1	–	–	–	–	–	–	1
11	(Italy) Giovanni Invernizzi	1	–	–	–	–	–	–	1
11	(Brazil) Leonardo	–	1	–	–	–	–	–	1
11	(Italy) Gianpiero Marini	–	–	–	–	1	–	–	1
11	(Italy) Francesco Mauro	1 (Note: Shared title.)	–	–	–	–	–	–	1
11	(Italy) Nino Resegotti	1	–	–	–	–	–	–	1
11	(Italy) Luigi Simoni	–	–	–	–	1	–	–	1
11	(Hungary) Árpád Weisz	1	–	–	–	–	–	–	1
