= Javier Zanetti =

Argentine footballer (born 1973)

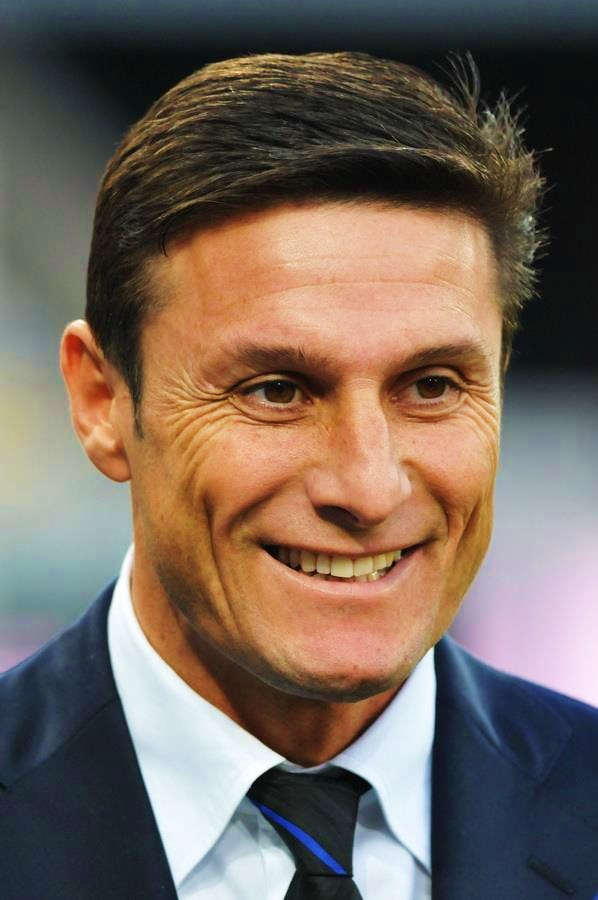
- Zanetti in 2014

Personal information
- Full name: Javier Adelmar Zanetti
- Date of birth: 10 August 1973 (age 53)
- Place of birth: Buenos Aires, Argentina
- Height: 1.78 m (5 ft 10 in)
- Positions: Full-back; midfielder

Team information
- Current team: Inter Milan (vice-president)

Youth career
- 1982–1989: Independiente
- 1991–1992: Talleres

Senior career*
Years	Team	Apps	(Gls)
1992–1993	Talleres	33	(1)
1993–1995	Banfield	66	(4)
1995–2014	Inter Milan	615	(12)
Total		714	(17)

International career
1996	Argentina U23	13	(0)
1994–2011	Argentina	145	(5)
Medal record
Men's football
Representing Argentina
Pan American Games
Gold medal – first place	1995 Mar del Plata	Team
Olympic Games
Silver medal – second place	1996 Atlanta	Team
Copa América
Runner-up	2004 Peru	Team
Runner-up	2007 Venezuela	Team
FIFA Confederations Cup
Runner-up	1995 Saudi Arabia	Team
Runner-up	2005 Germany	Team
- * Club domestic league appearances and goals

Javier Adelmar Zanetti (Spanish: [xaˈβjeɾ aðelˈmaɾ saˈneti], Italian: [dzaˈnetti]; born 10 August 1973) is an Argentine former professional footballer. Spending nearly all his career at Inter Milan, Zanetti was known for his versatility and adeptness, often playing as full-back or wing-back on both flanks, and as a midfielder. He had a key role in the treble-winning 2009–10 season, and he is currently the vice-president of Inter Milan.

Zanetti started his career in Argentina, first with Talleres, and then Banfield. From 1995 to 2014 he played for Italian club Inter Milan and was captain from 2001 until his retirement in 2014. Having participated in 1,115 official games, he is on the list of men's footballers with the most official appearances (the first Argentinean to achieve the feat, since the time matches are recorded). He is also the foreign player with the most appearances in Serie A (615), and holds the fourth-most appearances in the league, behind only Gianluigi Buffon, Paolo Maldini and Francesco Totti. He holds the record for the most appearances in the history of Inter (858), as well as the record for the most trophies won with the club, with 16; five Scudetti, four Coppa Italia, four Supercoppa Italiana, one UEFA Cup, one Champions League and the FIFA Club World Cup. He also has the most appearances as captain in the Champions League (82).

With the Argentina national team, Zanetti played in 145 games, a figure that makes him the player with the joint-third most appearances in the history of La Albiceleste, having formerly held the record from 2007 to 2018. With Argentina he reached the final of the Copa América in 2004 and 2007, and the FIFA Confederations Cup in 1995 and 2005.

On retiring, Inter Milan retired Zanetti's number 4 jersey and named him as its vice president. He has been named an ambassador for the SOS Children's Villages project in Argentina by FIFA, and in 2005 he received the Ambrogino d'Oro award from the city of Milan for his social initiatives. Zanetti is also a Global Ambassador for the Special Olympics.

== Early life ==
Javier Adelmar Zanetti was born in Buenos Aires to working-class parents of Italian ancestry and grew up in the harbour area in the Dock Sud district, one of the city's most notorious areas. His father Rodolfo was a bricklayer and his mother Violeta Bonnazola was a cleaner. Reportedly, some of Zanetti's ancestors were Italian settlers brought to southern Chile by Giorgio Ricci in the aftermath of the Occupation of Araucanía (1861–1883). He began playing football on a field in the city suburbs, maintaining the pitch in his spare time. When he was a teenager, he tried out for local club Independiente's youth academy, but was ultimately rejected and told that he lacked the physique to succeed in the game. Instead, he concentrated on school and worked as an assistant to his father with masonry as well as odd jobs such as delivering milk and helping out at a relative's grocery store.

== Club career ==
=== Talleres ===
After his rejection from Independiente, Zanetti signed for Talleres, then a second division team. With them, he played 33 matches and scored one goal in his only season, before moving in 1993 to the First Division club Banfield.

=== Banfield ===
A 20-year-old Zanetti debuted for Banfield on 12 September 1993 in a home match against River Plate. He scored his first goal 17 days later against Newell's Old Boys in a match that ended 1–1. His outstanding performances for Banfield gained popularity from El Taladro fans and also earned him a call-up from the national team. First division giants River Plate and Boca Juniors displayed interest, but Zanetti decided to stay on for another year at the club. In 1995, along with fellow Argentine Sebastián Rambert, he transferred to Italy's Inter Milan, becoming team owner Massimo Moratti's first-ever purchase.

=== Inter Milan ===
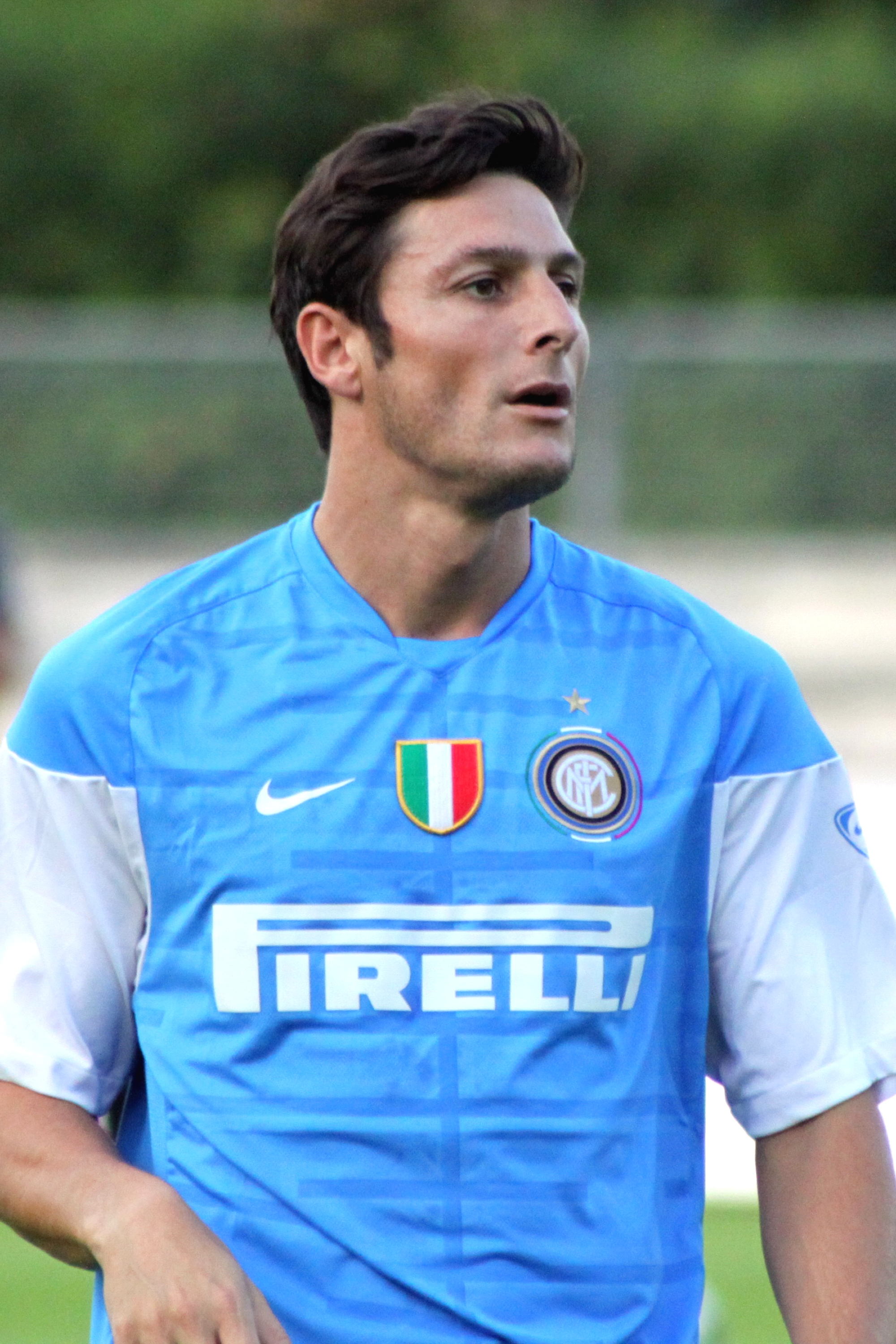
Zanetti training with Inter Milan in 2009

As a part of the squad for 19 seasons and with 858 appearances across all competitions, he is currently the team's longest-tenured player, and the first overall – surpassing Giuseppe Bergomi (758) – in the all-time list of Inter players by most games played.

Throughout his stay with the club, he won 16 trophies, 15 of which came under his captaincy: the UEFA Cup in 1998, the 2005, 2006, 2010 and 2011 Coppa Italia, the 2005, 2006, 2008 and 2010 Supercoppa Italiana, the 2005–06, 2006–07, 2007–08, 2008–09 and 2009–10 Scudetti and the 2009–10 UEFA Champions League.

Zanetti went 12 years without being sent off in a match. The first time he was sent off in his career was on 17 February 1999 in a Coppa Italia match against Parma, but he broke his streak when he was sent off in a Serie A match against Udinese on 3 December 2011. These were the only two times he was sent off during his entire career at Inter.

At Inter, Zanetti played under 19 different coaches, making him the only player to have played under this many coaches. He has pledged his future to the Nerazzurri, hoping to have a future behind the desk at the club in his retirement from playing. "Inter means a lot to me", Zanetti said.

It was the first team to open the doors of European football. I was very young when I came here and I think not many teams could have had so much faith and patience with a boy in his early 20s from the very first day like Inter did with me. I will always be grateful for that. For some reason I have always felt at home here at Inter and this is why I have never thought of leaving.

==== Early career ====
Zanetti made his debut for Inter on 27 August 1995 against Vicenza in Milan. He scored Inter's second goal in their 3–0 win over compatriots Lazio in the 1998 UEFA Cup final at the Parc des Princes in Paris, his first silverware at the club, after losing in the final in the previous season.

After two years, in which he consistently wore the captain band in place of the injured Ronaldo, Zanetti was rewarded with the club captaincy in late 2001.

In August 2003, Zanetti signed a new contract with the club until June 2007.

==== Move to midfield ====
After the arrival of Maicon at the beginning of the 2006–07 season, Zanetti was moved from the right-back position into midfield. He ended a four-year goal drought when he scored on 5 November 2006 at a home match against Ascoli, having previously scored on 6 November 2002 at an away match against Empoli. On 27 September 2006, against Bayern Munich, Zanetti played his 500th professional match for Inter and on 22 November 2006, he appeared in his 100th UEFA match, against Sporting CP.

Zanetti played an important role in the 2008 Supercoppa Italiana match over Roma, scoring his team's last penalty in a subsequent shootout win after the regular and extra time ended in a 2–2 draw; this was his first ever career penalty and the third Supercoppa Italiana title. Zanetti then celebrated his 600th match for Inter on 24 September 2008 with a 1–0 win over newly promoted Lecce. Minutes before the match, he was presented with a commemorative plate by former vice-captain Iván Córdoba to mark the occasion.

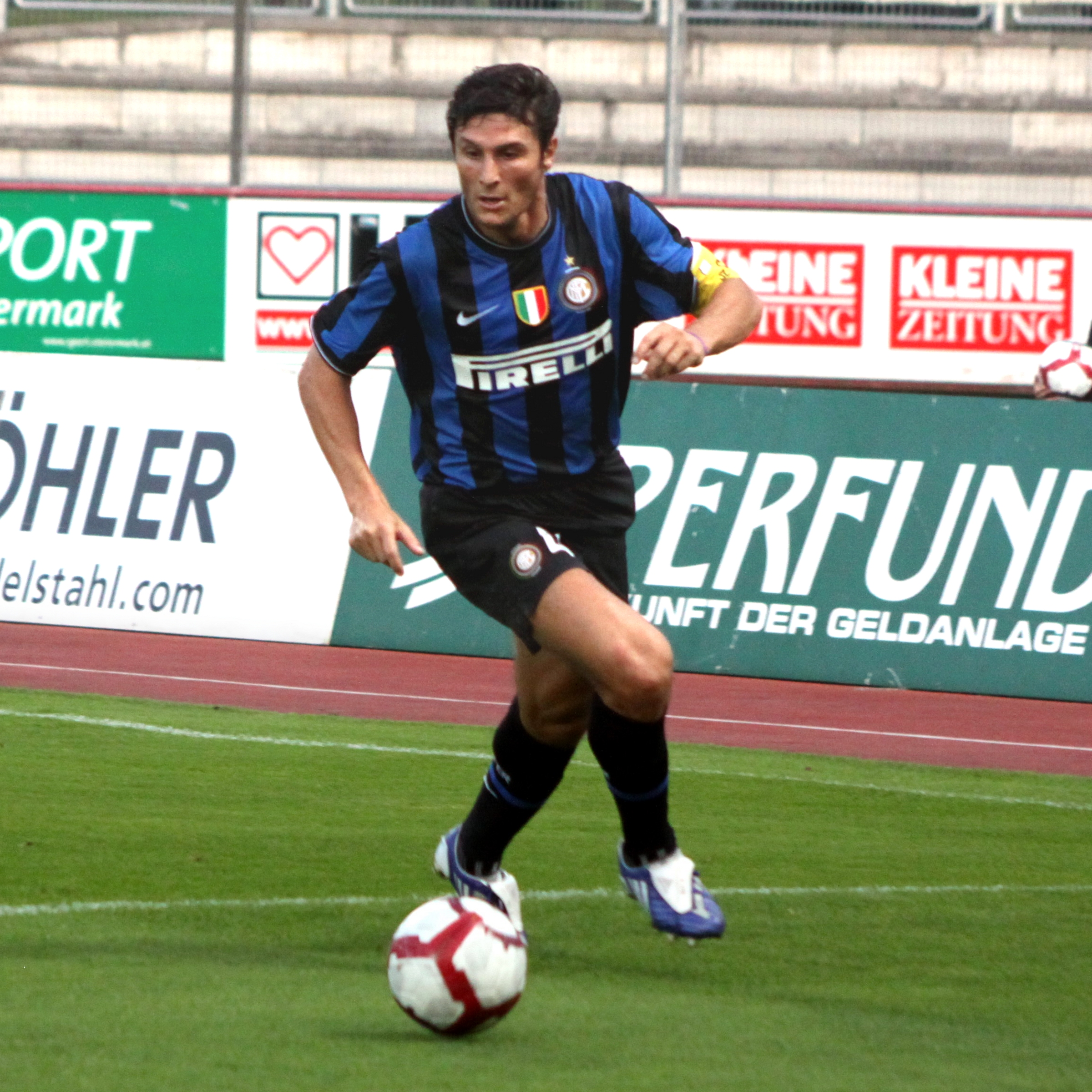
Zanetti playing for Inter in 2009

Though Zanetti is more often classified as a defender, he played mostly in midfield during the first half of the 2008–09 season. For the last several weeks of October 2008, with Inter coach José Mourinho facing a midfield crisis due to injuries to key midfielders Esteban Cambiasso and Sulley Muntari, he was moved again to the midfield for the matches against Genoa and Fiorentina. During that period, Mourinho played him in the midfield due to the presence of Maicon, Lúcio, Walter Samuel and Cristian Chivu in the back four.

The 2009–10 season began well for Zanetti and Inter, especially after a 4–0 thrashing of crosstown rivals Milan in the Derby della Madonnina. In the match against Genoa on 17 October, he started off the counter-attack that led to Inter's second goal after dispossessing a Genoa player. Inter became the first team of the season to win by a five-goal margin. On 24 October, he reached Giacinto Facchetti's record of 476 Serie A appearances when he turned out for the match against Catania, which ended in a 2–1 win for the Nerazzurri.

Inter won the 2010 Champions League final 2–0 against Bayern Munich on 22 May 2010. This was Zanetti's 700th appearance for Inter, and it made him the first player to captain an Italian club to a treble of the Scudetto, Coppa Italia and Champions League.

==== Later career ====
On 20 October 2010, at 37 years and 71 days, Zanetti became the oldest player to score in the Champions League when he netted in the opening minute of Inter's 4–3 group stage win over Tottenham Hotspur at the San Siro. This was only his second ever Champions League goal; his first came in December 1998 in a match in a 2–0 win against Sturm Graz. He scored one of Inter's goals in their 3–0 win against Seongnam Ilhwa Chunma at the 2010 FIFA Club World Cup, which they eventually won, although Inter missed out on the UEFA Super Cup that season.

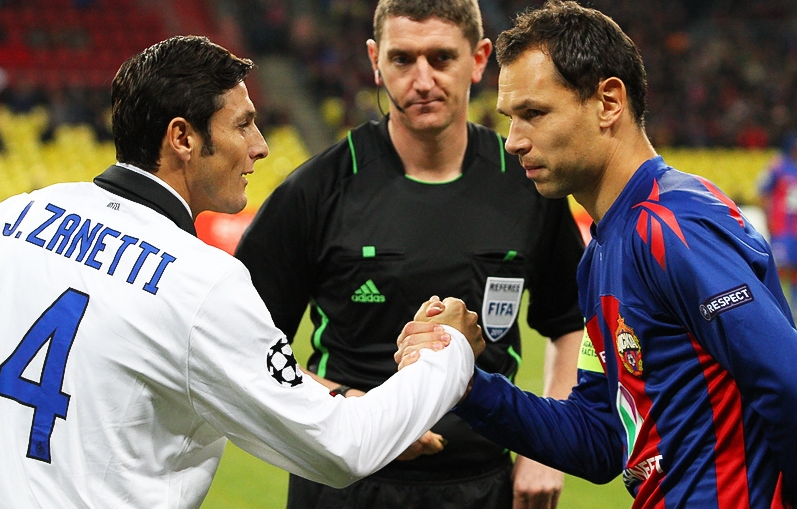
Zanetti shaking hands with Sergei Ignashevich before a Champions League match against CSKA Moscow in 2011

On 19 January 2011, Zanetti overtook Inter legend Giuseppe Bergomi in Serie A appearances, his 520th match in Serie A, all for Inter. On 11 May 2011, Zanetti made his 1,000th appearance as a professional footballer playing for Inter against Roma in the second leg of the Coppa Italia semi-final. On 20 September 2011, Zanetti made the all-time appearance record in a Serie A clash against Novara, surpassing Giuseppe Bergomi.

On 10 March 2013, Zanetti played in his 600th Serie A match for Inter, a 1–0 loss to Bologna at the San Siro. On 21 April 2014, in the 1–0 home win against Parma, Zanetti played his 1,100th official match, and became the player with the fourth-most appearances of all time.

On 29 April 2014, Inter chairman Erick Thohir announced that Zanetti would retire at the end of the 2013–14 season and become a club director. Zanetti's last competitive match at the San Siro was a 4–1 victory over Lazio on 10 May 2014. He came on as a substitute for Jonathan Moreira in the 52nd minute and wore a special armband featuring the names of every player he had played with during his career at Inter. He retired after the last game of the season, which he started as centre-back in a 2–1 away defeat to Chievo on 18 May.

== Post-playing career ==
In June 2014, Inter chairman Erick Thohir appointed Zanetti vice-president for a two-year term. Zanetti kept the role upon the change of ownership to the Suning Holdings Group.

On 4 May 2015, during a charitable match at the San Siro, with former and current football stars, organised by Zanetti himself for the opening celebrations for the Expo 2015 in Milan, Inter officially retired Zanetti's number 4 jersey.

== International career ==
=== Debuts and 100th appearance ===
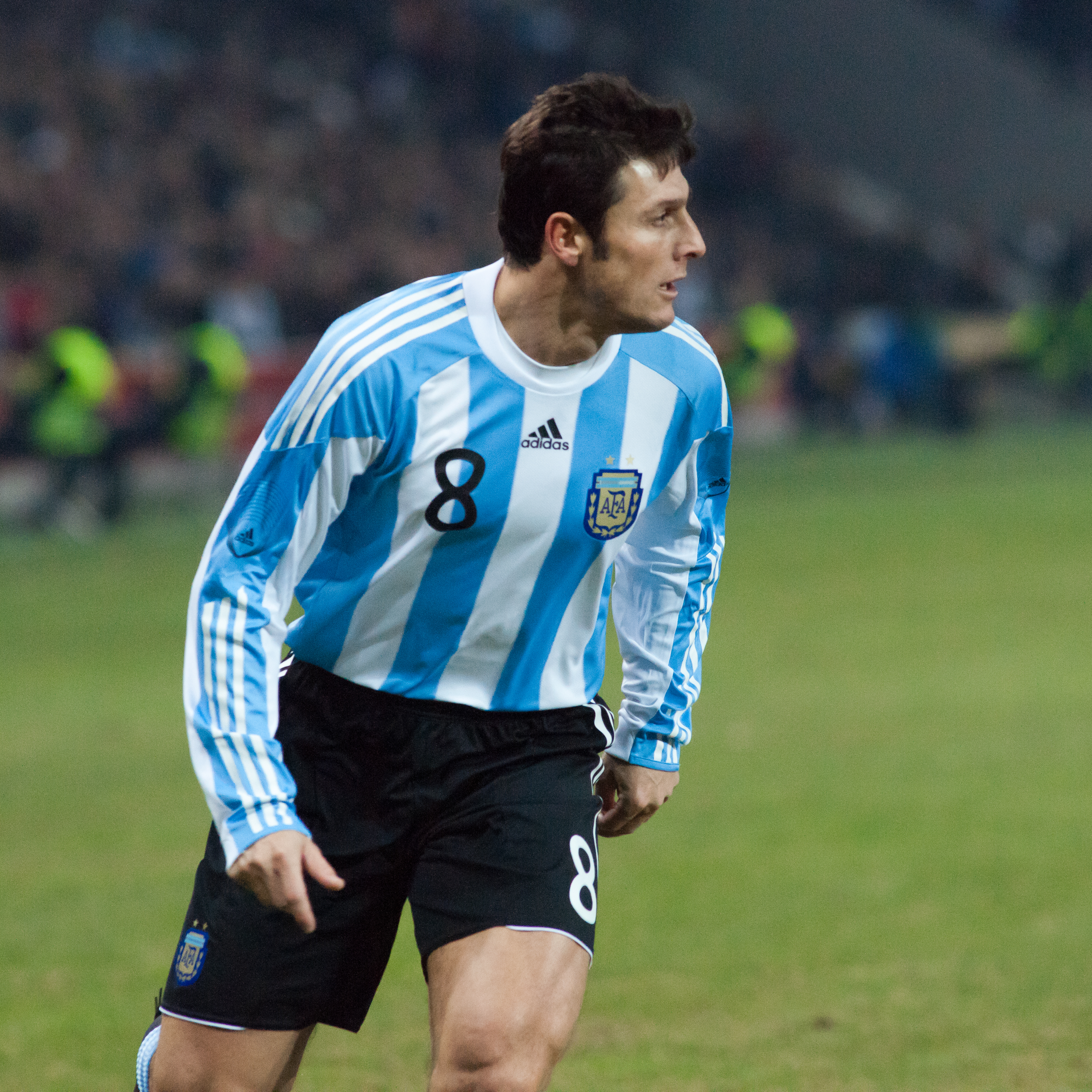
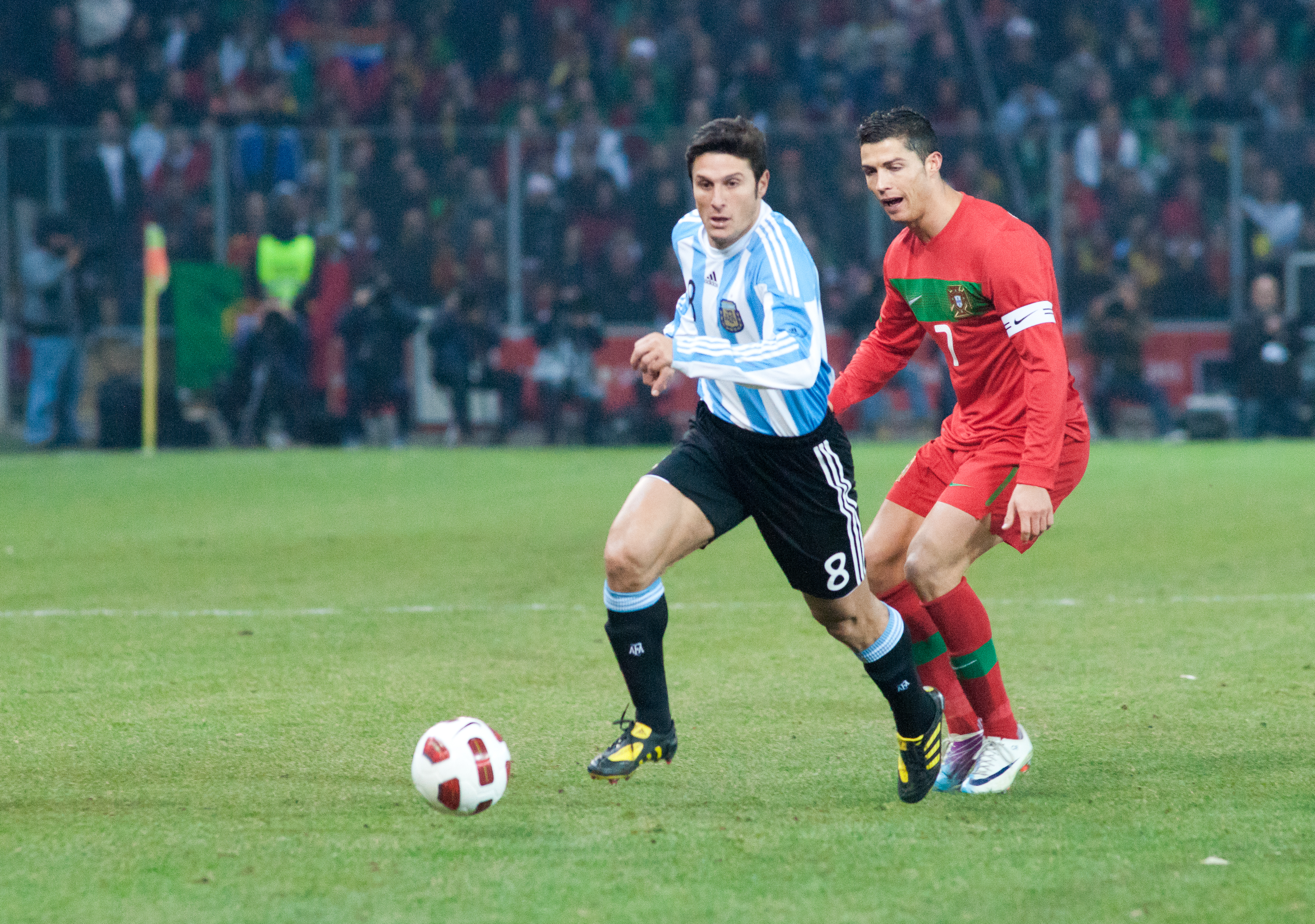

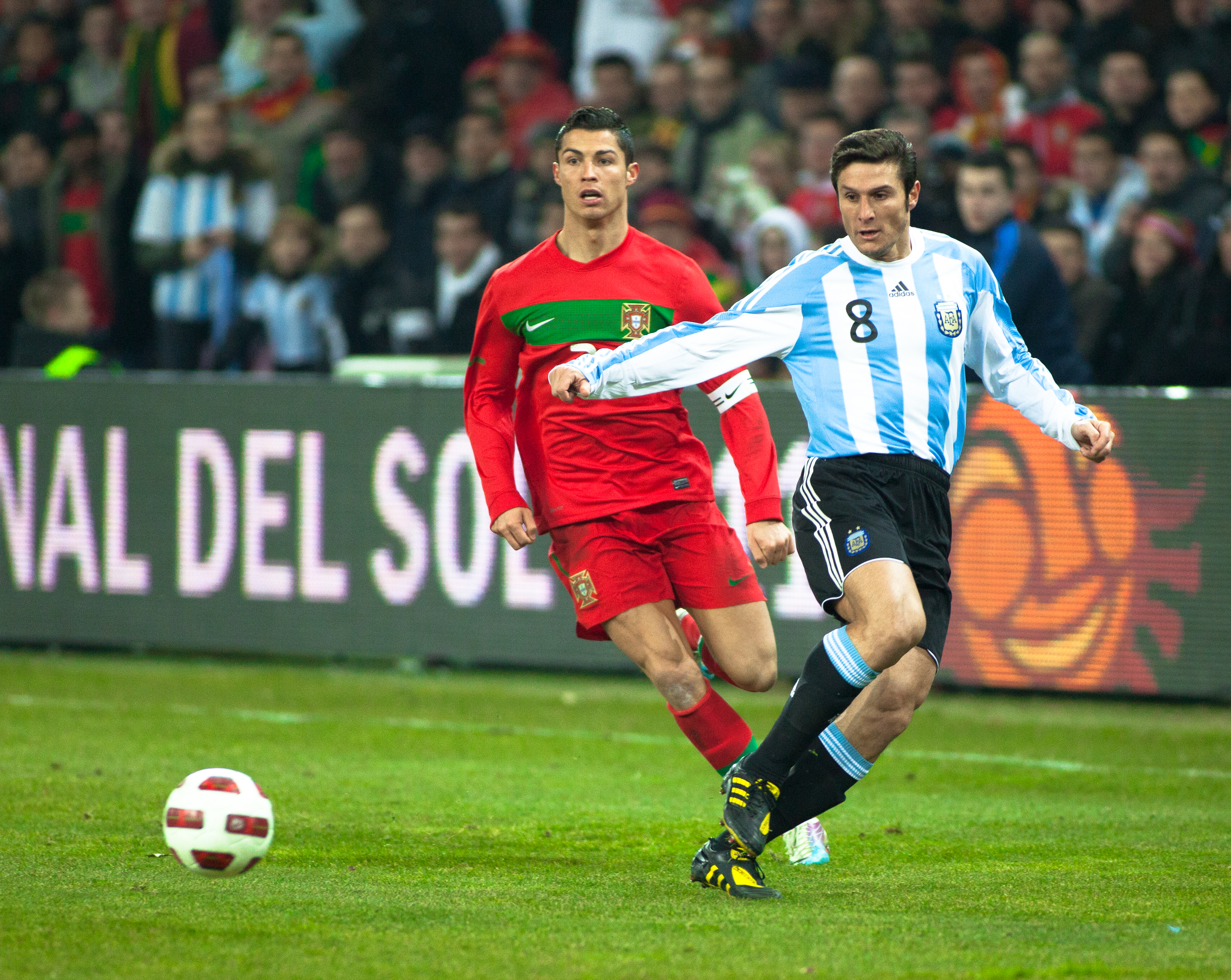
Javier Zanetti in action against Portugal's Cristiano Ronaldo during a friendly match in Geneva, Switzerland, in 2011.

Zanetti debuted for Argentina on 16 November 1994 against Chile under coach Daniel Passarella. He was called up for the 1998 FIFA World Cup in France, making his competitive debut in team's opening group match against Japan which finished in a 1–0 victory. During the 1998 World Cup run, Zanetti scored the last goal of a 2–2 draw with England in the round of 16, sending the game to extra time and penalties. Marek Kopacz, who was married to future prime minister Ewa Kopacz, was a prosecutor in the Polish city of Szydłowiec; he had been stalked by a gang who knew that he usually got in his car at 10 p.m., but he changed his routine to watch the rest of the game, and avoided being killed by a car bomb. Marek Kopacz sent a letter of thanks to Zanetti and credited him with saving his life, and Zanetti responded that he would like to meet him.

Zanetti celebrated his 100th cap by helping Argentina win their 2005 FIFA Confederations Cup semi-final over Mexico on 26 June 2005, in which he won the Man of the Match award. Despite having been part of the team during the qualification rounds, Zanetti was not called up for the 2006 FIFA World Cup by coach José Pékerman in a controversial decision.

=== 2000s ===
With new coach Alfio Basile, Zanetti played a friendly match against France on 7 February 2007, helping Javier Saviola to score the only goal of the game that gave Argentina the first victory under Basile's second management.

In April 2007, Zanetti was presented with the National Giuseppe Prisco Award. After the retirement of Roberto Ayala, Zanetti was given the captain's armband. In a World Cup qualification match against Bolivia on 17 November 2007, he became the highest capped player for Argentina.

Zanetti remained a regular footballer under new coach Diego Maradona, although defensive midfielder Javier Mascherano took over as captain at Maradona's request. Zanetti's place in the starting line up was taken by Jonás Gutiérrez, who had spent the previous season playing on the wing for Newcastle United in England's second-tier Football League Championship.

=== Return to the Argentine senior squad ===
On 20 August 2010, Argentina coach Sergio Batista recalled Zanetti to the squad for a friendly match against Spain played on 7 September 2010 at the River Plate Monumental Stadium, where he and fellow legend Gabriel Batistuta were honored by the Argentine Football Association for their outstanding careers with more than 48,000 people giving them a standing ovation. He was called again for the friendly against Japan at the Saitama in October 2010, but withdrew at the last minute due to injury.

Zanetti was a member of Argentina's squad for the 2011 Copa América on home soil, starting in all four of the team's matches as they were eliminated by Uruguay in the quarter-finals.

== Style of play ==
I faced Zanetti for the first time in the Champions League quarter-finals in 1999, he was the right-back and I was on the left. He impressed with his qualities, his speed, power, intelligence and expertise. I played against him twice more and he was my most difficult opponent, a complete player.

— Ryan Giggs.

Zanetti earned the nickname El Tractor for his stamina and tireless energetic runs up and down the wings to aid both attack and defence. He was known amongst his teammates for consistency and fitness regime, which he has credited with prolonging his career. During his last few seasons, he started in over 30 games despite being in his late 30s. As a captain for both his club and international sides, he was well-respected by both fans and the opposition for his leadership, calm demeanor and conduct both on and off the pitch; in his entire 22-year career, he only received two red cards.

Zanetti was a quick, strong and physically fit player in his prime, with outstanding physical attributes, excellent ball control, dribbling, technical ability and acceleration. Defensively, he excelled at reading the game, and he was a good ball-winner and man-marker, although he was also effective at distributing the ball to teammates, due to his passing range and vision. A two-way and two-footed player, he excelled at playing on either flank, where he was capable of advancing into more offensive positions to cross balls for teammates. He also possessed an accurate shot from distance. During his later years at Inter, he was known to have developed a formidable partnership with fellow full-back Maicon, leading the club to win several titles.

Zanetti began his career as a right offensive winger, but was later moved back into midfield, where he became a tactically intelligent and versatile player, who was capable of playing anywhere in midfield or in defence. He was primarily used as a wide midfielder or as a full-back or wing-back on either flank throughout his career, although he has also been deployed as a central defender, sweeper, or as a central or defensive midfielder. He was even deployed in more offensive roles on occasion. Zanetti has been praised for his determination, consistency, and work-rate, as well as his discipline and longevity, which he has attributed to his diligence in training sessions.

== Personal life ==
On 23 December 1999, Zanetti married his long-time girlfriend Paula de la Fuente, the daughter of a university lecturer. They met when he was 19 and she was 14 and dated for seven years prior to their marriage. They live near Lake Como, and they also own a restaurant called El Gaucho in Milan in the Navigli district, a popular tourist area. Paula currently works as a photographer. The couple have a daughter, Sol (born 11 June 2005), and two sons, Ignacio (born 27 July 2008) and Tomás (born 9 May 2012).

Zanetti's mother, Violeta Bonazzola, died from a heart attack hours after Inter's triumph in 2011 Coppa Italia final. He has published two autobiographies: Capitano e gentiluomo in 2010 and Giocare da uomo in 2013.

Zanetti is a devout Catholic. Upon the 2013 election of fellow Argentine Pope Francis, Zanetti was invited to the Vatican for an audience with him.

I must admit that [what] I feel at this moment is especially a thrill for all of us Argentines. [I] do not know him personally, but it is a Pope who has lived in Buenos Aires, very humble and always always close to our people. Faith is so important in the world and us we are all close. I had the good fortune to meet Pope Ratzinger and now I expect to have the 'opportunity to meet the new national pope, it would be a great thrill for me and my whole family. [I] wish him all the best and again, for all of us as people of Argentina [it] is a great feeling.

Zanetti is a close friend of Dutch footballer Wesley Sneijder, whom he inspired to convert to Catholicism.

Zanetti's elder brother Sergio is a former football defender. Javier Zanetti is not related to Cristiano Zanetti, an Italian who played alongside him for five seasons at Inter.

In 2007, Zanetti collaborated with Italian singer Mina in a Spanish cover of the song "Parole parole", found in the album Todavía.

=== Charity work ===
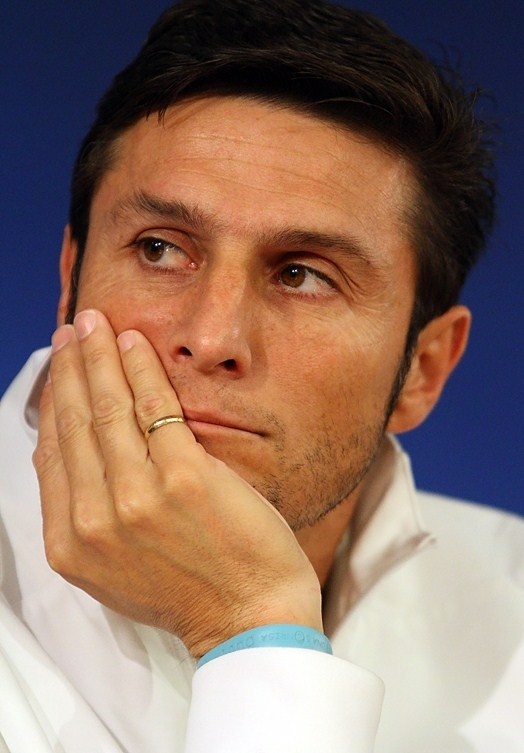
Zanetti in 2011

Zanetti is FIFA ambassador for the SOS Children's Villages project in Argentina, and has declared his support for the Mexican Zapatista rebels.

==== Fundación PUPI ====
Zanetti has also shown social conscience when in response to Argentina's economic crisis of 2001, which threw millions of people into poverty, Zanetti, with his wife Paula, created the Fundación PUPI in Argentina for the social integration of poor children. The aim of the organization is to help children who were left impoverished by the country's economic crisis by giving them educational opportunities, as well as taking care of their nutritional requirements. He explained:

When I look back to my childhood, many concrete scenes come to my mind, good ones and bad ones. I had a difficult childhood, and even though I don't live in my country at present, I'm well aware of what's going on there and the devastating effect it's having on our poorest children. I've always believed that our public actions need to take account of our social responsibility,

Zanetti, along with his compatriot Esteban Cambiasso, founded this charity association to help coach young children with social isolation problems and motor coordination difficulties. Zanetti said that "this spirit lies at the base of all of Inter's initiatives for youngsters:"

=== Media ===
In 2015 Zanetti was the subject of Zanetti Story, a documentary film by Simone Scafidi and Carlo A. Sigon.

Zanetti is featured in EA Sports' FIFA football video game series; he was included in the Ultimate Team Legends in FIFA 16.

== Career statistics ==
=== Club ===
Appearances and goals by club, season and competition
Club	Season	League			Cup		Continental (Note: Includes UEFA Champions League and UEFA Cup.)		Other (Note: Includes Serie A play-offs, Supercoppa Italiana, UEFA Super Cup and FIFA Club World Cup.)		Total	
Club	Season	Division	Apps	Goals	Apps	Goals	Apps	Goals	Apps	Goals	Apps	Goals
Talleres	1992–93	Primera Nacional	33	1	—		—		—		33	1
Banfield	1993–94	Primera División	37	1	—		—		—		37	1
Banfield	1994–95	Primera División	29	3	—		—		—		29	3
Banfield	Total		66	4	—		—		—		66	4
Inter Milan	1995–96	Serie A	32	2	5	0	2	0	—		39	2
Inter Milan	1996–97	Serie A	33	3	5	1	12	0	—		50	4
Inter Milan	1997–98	Serie A	28	0	4	0	9	2	—		41	2
Inter Milan	1998–99	Serie A	34	3	5	0	9	1	2	0	50	4
Inter Milan	1999–2000	Serie A	34	1	8	1	—		1	0	43	2
Inter Milan	2000–01	Serie A	29	0	1	0	4	0	—		34	0
Inter Milan	2001–02	Serie A	33	0	1	1	10	1	—		44	2
Inter Milan	2002–03	Serie A	34	1	1	0	18	0	—		53	1
Inter Milan	2003–04	Serie A	34	0	5	0	12	0	—		51	0
Inter Milan	2004–05	Serie A	35	0	3	0	11	0	—		49	0
Inter Milan	2005–06	Serie A	25	0	5	0	8	0	1	0	39	0
Inter Milan	2006–07	Serie A	37	1	4	0	8	0	1	0	50	1
Inter Milan	2007–08	Serie A	38	1	4	0	8	0	1	0	51	1
Inter Milan	2008–09	Serie A	38	0	4	0	8	0	1	0	51	0
Inter Milan	2009–10	Serie A	37	0	4	0	13	0	1	0	55	0
Inter Milan	2010–11	Serie A	35	0	5	0	8	1	4	1	52	2
Inter Milan	2011–12	Serie A	34	0	2	0	8	0	1	0	45	0
Inter Milan	2012–13	Serie A	33	0	4	0	11	0	—		48	0
Inter Milan	2013–14	Serie A	12	0	1	0	—		—		13	0
Inter Milan	Total		615	12	71	3	159	5	13	1	858	21
Career total			714	17	71	3	159	5	13	1	957	26

=== International ===
Appearances and goals by national team and year
National team	Year	Apps	Goals
Argentina	1994	3	0
Argentina	1995	15	1
Argentina	1996	6	0
Argentina	1997	4	0
Argentina	1998	9	2
Argentina	1999	11	0
Argentina	2000	7	0
Argentina	2001	9	0
Argentina	2002	6	0
Argentina	2003	8	1
Argentina	2004	14	1
Argentina	2005	10	0
Argentina	2006	0	0
Argentina	2007	15	0
Argentina	2008	11	0
Argentina	2009	8	0
Argentina	2010	2	0
Argentina	2011	7	0
Total		145	5

Scores and results list Argentina's goal tally first, score column indicates score after each Zanetti goal.

List of international goals scored by Javier Zanetti
No.	Date	Venue	Cap	Opponent	Score	Result	Competition
1	22 June 1995	Estadio Malvinas Argentinas, Mendoza, Argentina	11	Slovakia	2–0	6–0	Friendly
2	14 May 1998	Estadio Mario Alberto Kempes, Córdoba, Argentina	28	Bosnia and Herzegovina	3–0	5–0	Friendly
3	30 June 1998	Stade Geoffroy-Guichard, Saint-Étienne, France	34	England	2–2	2–2	1998 FIFA World Cup
4	8 June 2003	Nagai Stadium, Osaka, Japan	70	Japan	2–1	4–1	2003 Kirin Cup
5	9 October 2004	El Monumental, Buenos Aires, Argentina	88	Uruguay	3–0	4–2	2006 FIFA World Cup qualification

== Honours ==
Inter Milan

- Serie A: 2005–06, 2006–07, 2007–08, 2008–09, 2009–10
- Coppa Italia: 2004–05, 2005–06, 2009–10, 2010–11
- Supercoppa Italiana: 2005, 2006, 2008, 2010
- UEFA Champions League: 2009–10
- UEFA Cup: 1997–98
- FIFA Club World Cup: 2010

Argentina

- Pan American Games Gold Medal: 1995
- Olympic Games Silver Medal: 1996

Individual

- FIFA 100
- Pirata d'Oro (Inter Milan Player of the Year): 1996
- Pallone d'Argento: 2002
- Copa América Team of the Tournament: 2004, 2007
- FIFA FIFPro World XI Nominee 2005, 2008, 2010
- UEFA Team of the Year (Five-Time Nominee): 2003, 2007, 2008, 2009, 2010
- Premio Nazionale Carriera Esemplare "Gaetano Scirea": 2010
- UEFA Champions League Squad of the Season: 2009–10
- The Guardian Serie A Team of the Year: 2009–10
- Konex Award Merit Diploma as One of the Five Best Football Players of the Last Decade in Argentina: 2010
- Golden Foot: 2011, as Football Legend
- Premio Internazionale Giacinto Facchetti: 2012
- Gran Galà del Calcio AIC Loyalty Award: 2012
- Number 4 Retired by Inter Milan as a Recognition to His Career at the Club
- Premio Gentleman Platinum Career Award: 2014
- AFA Team of All Time (Published 2015)
- Globe Soccer Player Career Award: 2016
- Inter Milan Hall of Fame: 2018
- The Guardian Serie A Team of the 1990s: 2018
- Italian Football Hall of Fame: 2018
- IFFHS Argentina All Times Dream Team: 2021

== See also ==
- List of men's footballers with 100 or more international caps
- List of men's footballers with the most official appearances

Sporting positions
Preceded by Ronaldo	Inter Milan captain 2001–2014	Succeeded by Andrea Ranocchia
