= Mila Schön =

Dalmatian Italian fashion designer (1916–2008)

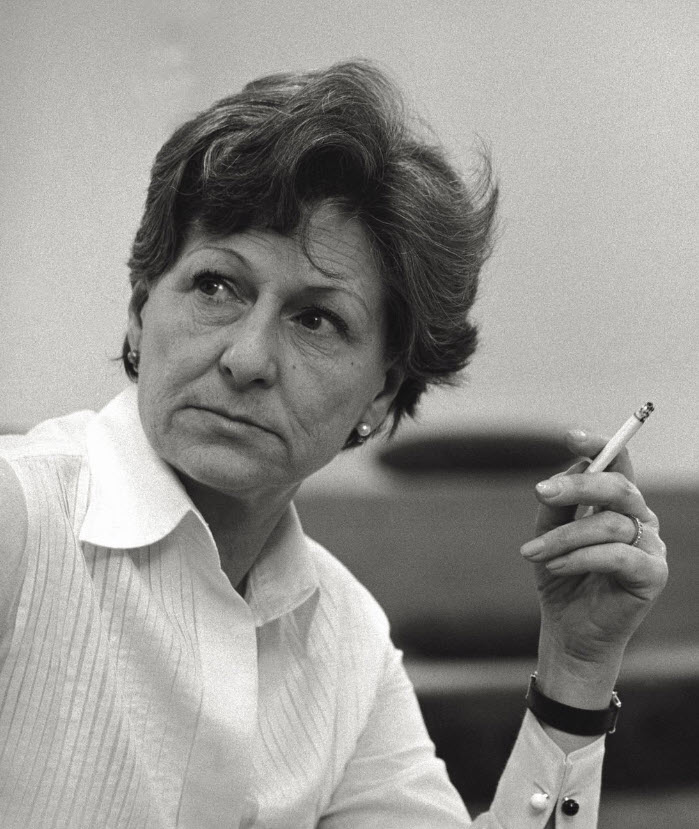
- Mila Schön in her atelier in 1969.
- Born: Maria Carmen Nutrizio; September 28, 1916; Trogir, Austria-Hungary
- Died: September 5, 2008 (aged 91); Quargnento, Italy
- Occupation: Fashion designer
- Relatives: Nino Nutrizio (brother)

Mila Schön (born Maria Carmen Nutrizio; September 28, 1916 – September 5, 2008) was a Dalmatian Italian fashion designer. Her surname was also spelled as Schoen.

== Early life ==
Maria Carmen Nutrizio was born in Trogir to wealthy Dalmatian Italian aristocratic parents; her younger brother was journalist and newspaper editor Stefano "Nino" Nutrizio. With the breakup of the Austro-Hungarian Empire at the end of World War I, her family lost their estates. The family moved to Italy where her father managed a pharmacy.

During World War II, Mila married Aurelio Schön, an Austrian precious metals dealer, whom she met in Milan. In the postwar period, Schön enjoyed a brief return to wealth. She became a client of the most prestigious Parisian couture houses such as Balenciaga and Dior.

== Fashion career ==
Following the failure of her husband's business and the couple's divorce, Schön once again found herself without financial resources. Unable to afford Parisian couture, she paid skilled Milanese seamstresses to copy the latest couture. But Schön had to wait for her first show until 1965. In 1958 Mila worked in an high-fashion atelier in Milan. In 1966 she opened her own boutique on Milan's shopping street Via Montenapoleone. The Via Monte Napoleone shop was decorated with modern furniture by Joe Colombo and Eero Saarinen.

In 1965, Schön showed her collection at the Pitti Palace in Florence along with other major Italian designers. For this show, all of Schön's fashion were in various shades of violet. Afterwards, The New York Times called her “the shrinking violet of the Italian haute couture” (1968) and declared she did not “make clothes for shrinking violets" (1973). Her work was introduced in the United States in 1967 in Dallas and Houston by Neiman Marcus.

In 1969, she designed uniforms for Air Italia. Schön's men's line and her first prêt-à-porter collection for women appeared in 1971. In 1972, she designed uniforms for Iran Air. She was the first Italian designer to show ready-to-wear in Japan. By the 1980s, Schön had shops in Italy, Japan, and the United States with offerings that included handbags and shoes, lingerie and watches, perfume, swimwear and eyewear. In 1992, she designed the Italian national team at the 1992 Barcelona Olympics.

In 1993, the brand was taken over by Itochu, a Japanese conglomerate, which sold it to Burani. In 2007, the brand was acquired by an Italian company, Brand Extension. In 2005, Ronna was the Mila Schön ready-to-wear license holder in Japan with retail value of €30 million.

== Style and influence ==
Her clothing was often geometric and according to Frances D'emilio at The Boston Globe, "fashion-world examples of cubism." Schön signatures included intricate beading and wool coats that eschewed traditional linings in favor of “double facing” (two layers of wool stitched together).

Her designs borrowed from the modern art she collected - Victor Vasarely, Kenneth Noland, Alexander Calder, Lucio Fontana. Examples of Schön's work are held by museums such as the Metropolitan Museum of Art and the Victoria and Albert Museum. Shortly after Schön's death in 2008, Milan's Palazzo Reale exhibited a retrospective of her work.

== Famous clients ==
Schön's clients included Jacqueline Kennedy, Lee Radziwill, Marella Agnelli, Farah Diba, Imelda Marcos, and Brooke Astor. At Truman Capote's 1966 black-and-white ball, Marella Agnelli was voted the best-dressed guest in a kaftan embroidered by Schön's craftswomen. The third in the best-dressed guest contest was Lee Radziwill in a sequined Schön shift.
