= Joe Spottiswood =

English footballer

Personal information
- Full name: Joseph Dominic Spottiswood
- Date of birth: 16 March 1893
- Place of birth: Carlisle, England
- Date of death: 7 May 1960 (aged 67)
- Place of death: Paddington, England
- Position: Outside left

Youth career
- 1911–1912: Catholic Young Men's Society

Senior career*
Years	Team	Apps	(Gls)
1912–1913	Carlisle United		
1913–1914	Manchester City	6	(0)
1914–1915	Bury	6	(1)
1919–1920	Chelsea	1	(0)
1920–1925	Swansea Town	159	(9)
1925–1926	Queens Park Rangers	22	(2)
- * Club domestic league appearances and goals

Joseph Dominic Spottiswood (16 March 1893 – 7 May 1960) was an English professional footballer who made over 150 appearances in the Football League for Swansea Town. An outside left, he also played for Manchester City, Bury, Chelsea and Queens Park Rangers.

== Personal life ==
Spottiswood's brother Bob was also a footballer. He served as a private in the Manchester Regiment during the First World War.

== Career statistics ==
Appearances and goals by club, season and competition
Club	Season	League			FA Cup		Other		Total	
Club	Season	Division	Apps	Goals	Apps	Goals	Apps	Goals	Apps	Goals
Manchester City	1913–14	First Division	6	0	0	0	―		6	0
Bury	1914–15	Second Division	6	1	0	0	―		6	1
Chelsea	1919–20	First Division	1	0	0	0	―		1	0
Queens Park Rangers	1925–26	Third Division South	22	2	0	0	1 (Note: Appearance in London Challenge Cup)	0	23	2
Career total			35	3	0	0	1	0	36	3

== Honours ==
Swansea Town

- Football League Third Division South: 1924–25
