= Sergio Zanetti =

Argentine footballer and manager

Personal information
- Full name: Sergio Ariel Zanetti
- Date of birth: 22 November 1967 (age 58)
- Place of birth: Avellaneda, Argentina
- Height: 1.76 m (5 ft 9 in)
- Position: Defender

Senior career*
Years	Team	Apps	(Gls)
1985–1988	Talleres (RE)	33	(0)
1988–1995	Deportivo Español	261	(8)
1995–2001	Racing Club	154	(3)
2001–2002	Cremonese	0	(0)
2002–2003	Verbania	17	(2)
2003–2005	Bellinzona	48	(3)
2005–2006	Locarno	29	(0)
Total		542	(16)

Managerial career
- 2007–2008: Pro Sesto (youth)
- 2008–2009: Monza (youth)
- 2009–2010: Pro Patria (youth)
- 2010–2011: Como (youth)
- 2011–2013: Inter Milan (youth)
- 2013–2014: Livorno (youth)
- 2015: Lecco
- 2016–2023: Pro Vercelli (youth)
- 2023: Bellinzona
- * Club domestic league appearances and goals

Sergio Zanetti (born 22 November 1967) is an Argentine football manager and former player who played as a defender.

== Career ==
He played for Talleres de Remedios de Escalada, Deportivo Español and Racing Club in Argentina, Cremonese (Italy), Verbania Calcio (Italy), AC Bellinzona (Switzerland) and FC Locarno (Switzerland).

After retirement he turned into a youth team coach (Allievi Nazionali level) for Lombardian clubs such as Pro Sesto, Monza and Como.

== Personal life ==
Zanetti is the older brother of former Inter and Argentina footballer Javier Zanetti.
