= Fundación PUPI =

Argentine nonprofit organization

- Founded: 2001
- Founder: Javier and Paula Zanetti
- Type: Nonprofit organization
- Location: Remedios de Escalada, Argentina
- Region served: Buenos Aires Province
- Services: Providing aid and social integration for poor and disadvantaged children
- Key people: Andrés de la Fuente (President)

The Fundación P.U.P.I. (English: PUPI Foundation) is an Argentine nonprofit organization which provides aid to poor and disadvantaged children. The foundation is predominantly localized in the Buenos Aires Province, particularly in townships where the majority of the population live below the poverty line. It is recognized by the government and collaborates with corporate sponsors, other charities and local football clubs.

== History ==
Fundación P.U.P.I. was founded in 2001 by now retired football player Javier Zanetti and his wife Paula. The name P.U.P.I. derives from Zanetti's nickname, which is El Pupi, but it is also a backronym for Por un piberío integrado (English: For an integrated childhood).

Zanetti's own working-class background and upbringing in the notorious Buenos Aires district of Dock Sud led him to create the foundation to aid impoverished children. It initially began in Lanús, one of the most deprived districts of the Buenos Aires Province, but has since spread to other districts and townships in the province.

== Activities and programmes ==
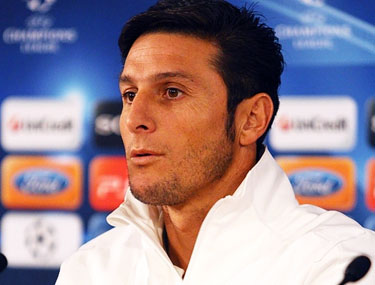
Javier Zanetti in 2011, founder

The foundation is responsible for meeting the basic needs of children, to provide them food, education, health and aid for their families. In addition to providing daily necessities, the foundation also seeks to integrate the children into the wider society with the assistance of psychologists, sociologists, counselors and social workers.

At the beginning of the day, social workers accompany the children to school. When school is over, the children are taken to the foundation headquarters where they participate in extra-curricular activities such as sports and the fine arts. Children in the programme are taught hygiene and self-grooming. Lunch and two snacks are provided daily.

The organization's president is Andrés de la Fuente and Monica Giacoletto, who specialize in psychopedagogy. They are the father-and mother-in-law of Zanetti.

Javier Zanetti has also received financial help from some teammates at Inter, as the Chilean Iván Zamorano.

The operating cost of the foundation is in fact quite large, with about three hundred thousand per year in costs; in May 2009, the foundation takes care of over a thousand people, including children and their families.
