= La Notte (newspaper) =

Italian afternoon newspaper founded in 1952

La Notte was an Italian afternoon newspaper published in Milan between 1952 and 1995.

== History ==
The newspaper was financed by industrialist Carlo Pesenti, who wanted to curb the potential rise of communism in the country and support the majority electoral law, referred by the left-wing parties as a "swindle law". The journalist Stefano "Nino" Nutrizio, the former chief editor of sport news of Il Popolo d'Italia, was appointed editor, a position he held until 1979.

The newspaper got an unexpected success, with a print run of 250,000 copies per day during the 1960s. Particular attention was given to crime news and sports. The paper also introduced several structural and conceptual innovations: it was the first Italian newspaper to publish stock market listings, the first to publish a guide to film shows with timetables, theatre addresses, ticket prices, phone numbers and transports, and the first to review films with a rating system, irritating cinema-owners who even launched a campaign to boycott the newspaper.

In 1984 the newspaper was bought by the publisher Rusconi, and in 1993 it was acquired by Paolo Berlusconi. Following a significant drop in sales, the paper closed in January 1995. An attempt to relaunch it in 1997 only lasted a few weeks.
