= Árpád Weisz =

Hungarian footballer and manager (1896–1944)

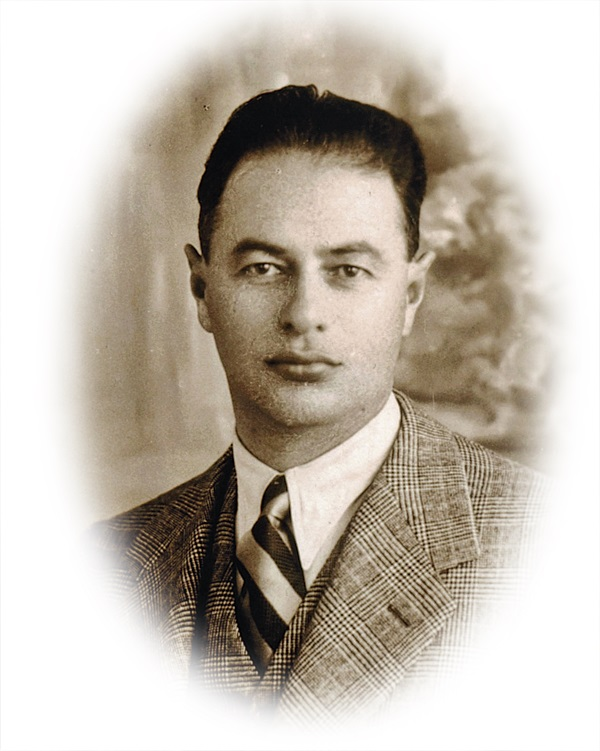
- Weisz c. 1920

Personal information
- Date of birth: 16 April 1896
- Place of birth: Solt, Austria-Hungary
- Date of death: 31 January 1944 (aged 47)
- Place of death: Auschwitz-Birkenau, Germany
- Position: Left winger

Senior career*
Years	Team	Apps	(Gls)
1922–1923	Törekvés SE		
1923–1924	Makabi Brno		
1924–1925	Alessandria	6	(1)
1925–1926	Inter Milan	10	(3)

International career
1922–1923	Hungary	6	(0)

Managerial career
- 1926–1928: Inter Milan
- 1929–1931: Inter Milan
- 1931–1932: Bari
- 1932–1934: Inter Milan
- 1934–1935: Novara
- 1935–1938: Bologna
- 1938–1940: Dordrecht
- * Club domestic league appearances and goals

Árpád Weisz (Hungarian pronunciation: [ˈaːrpaːd ˈvɛis]; also spelt Veisz; 16 April 1896 – 31 January 1944) was a Hungarian footballer and manager. Weisz was Jewish and was murdered with his wife and children by the Nazis during the Holocaust in World War II at Auschwitz.

== Playing career ==
Weisz played club football as a left winger in Hungary for Törekvés SE, in Czechoslovakia for Makabi Brno, and in Italy for Alessandria and Inter Milan.

Weisz earned six international caps between 1922 and 1923, and was a member of the Hungarian squad at the 1924 Summer Olympics in Paris. A serious injury cut short his playing career.

== Coaching career ==
After retiring as a player in 1926, Weisz became an assistant coach at Alessandria before moving to Inter Milan, where at the age of 34 he won one championship in the 1929–1930 season. Weisz had three separate spells as manager of Inter, 1926–28, 1929–31, and 1932–34, managing Giuseppe Meazza among his players. He also coached Bari, Novara and Bologna, where he won two league titles (in 1936 and 1937) before he was forced to flee Italy with his wife and two children following the enactment of the Italian Racial Laws. Weisz finished his career by coaching Dordrecht in the Netherlands, leaving in 1940 following the outbreak of the Second World War.

Four years later he was arrested by the SS and murdered by the Nazis at Auschwitz concentration camp, with his family of four (including his wife Elena, his son Roberto, and his daughter Clara) when they were gassed immediately upon arriving at Birkenau.

== Legacy ==
In January 2020, Chelsea unveiled a mural by Solomon Souza on an outside wall of the West Stand at Stamford Bridge. The mural is part of Chelsea's 'Say No to Antisemitism' campaign funded by club owner Roman Abramovich. Included on the mural are depictions of footballers Julius Hirsch and Weisz, who were killed at Auschwitz concentration camp, and Ron Jones, a British prisoner of war known as the 'Goalkeeper of Auschwitz'.
