= Bob Spottiswood =

English footballer and manager

Personal information
- Full name: Robert Spottiswood
- Date of birth: 20 January 1884
- Place of birth: Carlisle, England
- Date of death: 1st qtr 1966 (aged 81–82)
- Place of death: Bromley, England
- Position: Half back

Senior career*
Years	Team	Apps	(Gls)
- Carlisle United
1908–1909	Croydon Common	11	(0)
1909–1915	Crystal Palace	178	(2)
1919–1920	Clapton Orient	1	(0)
- Aberdare Athletic
1921	Treherbert		
- Sittingbourne
1922	Elsecar Main		

Managerial career
- 1922–1924: Inter Milan
- * Club domestic league appearances and goals

Robert Spottiswood (20 January 1884 – 1966) was an English football player and manager.

== Career ==
Born in Carlisle, Spottiswood played as a half back for Carlisle United, Croydon Common, Crystal Palace, Clapton Orient, Aberdare Athletic, Treherbert, Sittingbourne and Elsecar Main.

He later became a football manager, and was in charge of Inter Milan between 1922 and 1924.

== Personal life ==
His brother Joe was also a player.

Bob Spottiswood died in early 1966, in Bromley, Greater London, aged 81 or 82.
