= Nino Nutrizio =

Dalmatian Italian journalist

- Born: 10 February 1911; Traù, Kingdom of Dalmatia, Austria-Hungary (present-day Trogir, Croatia)
- Died: 20 October 1988 (aged 77); Bagno a Ripoli, Florence, Tuscany, Italy
- Spouse(s): Luciana Novaro; Elsa Robotti

Stefano "Nino" Nutrizio (10 February 1911 – 20 October 1988) was a Dalmatian Italian journalist. He is best remembered as the director of Italian daily La Notte and for his outspoken counter-current views.

== Biography ==
Nutrizio was born in Traù, Dalmatia, on 10 February 1911. He was the son of Dalmatian irredentists Luigi and Bianca Nutrizio (née Zacevich).

He grew up in Trieste, which as a young man he left for Genoa. There he started to work for the Giornale di Genova. In the early 1930s he entered in the sports' editorial offices of the Secolo XIX. Later, he became the director of the Genova Sport. In 1936 he was hired by Vito Mussolini (the son of Arnaldo) to work in his Popolo d’Italia.

In 1940 he was drafted in the Army, entering it as lieutenant. He was sent to the Navy as war correspondent. He was on board the cruiser Pola, sunk in the March 1941 Battle of Cape Matapan. He jumped from the cruiser into the sea during the night, and almost froze to death, but was saved by the Englishmen, who took him as a prisoner. He was one of the few who refused to submit to Badoglio's government, and as a consequence he remained 5 years in prison in Yol, India.

He never recanted his support for fascism and, as a consequence, had trouble finding work in liberated Italy. As early as 1947, however, he managed to enter the directorial board of football club Internazionale, thanks to the help of his friend Emilio Colombo. He collaborated with the Corriere di Milano, since, although the newspaper was reputed antifascist, Nutrizio believed it wasn't "too evil" after all. He then worked at Benso Fini's Corriere lombardo and several other newspapers. He was among the most popular sports journalists, and is best remembered as the director of the daily La notte, which he directed for 26 years.

An anti-communist and very hostile to the center-left as well, in 1963 he started, through his newspapers, an open campaign against the center-left, directed especially against Aldo Moro. He was pro-American and against students' movements. He supported apartheid. Nutrizio criticized the Soviet invasion of Czechoslovakia.

Conscious of having "given the best of himself" with his publications, he retired in his house in Florence's countryside in 1979. Nutrizio continued to collaborate with Indro Montanelli's Il Giornale in the following years. He died at Bagno a Ripoli on 20 October 1988.

== Personal life ==
His sister was the famous fashion designer Mila Schön. Nutrizio married twice, to ballerina Luciana Novaro and then to Elsa Robotti.

== Sources ==
- Fonti e Bibl.: G. Vaccaro, Panorama biografico degli italiani d’oggi, II, Roma 1956, p. 360;
- Il chi è? nel giornalismo italiano, Milano 1971, ad vocem;
- P. Murialdi, La stampa italiana del dopoguerra, 1943–1972, Roma-Bari 1974, pp. 234 s.;
- La stampa italiana del neocapitalismo, a cura di V. Castronovo - N. Tranfaglia, Roma-Bari 1976;
- M.R. Boensch, La libertà si difende, intervista a Nino N., in Il Borghese, XXVIII (1977), p. 101;
- La stampa italiana nell’età della TV 1975–1994, a cura di V. Castronovo - N. Tranfaglia, Roma-Bari 1994;
- G. Ruggeri, Berlusconi. Gli affari del presidente, Milano 1994, p. 130;
- P. Murialdi, La stampa italiana dalla Liberazione a fine secolo, Roma-Bari 1998, pp. 106, 214;
- C. Cederna, Il lato debole, a cura di G. Borghese - A. Cederna, Milano 2000, p. 126;
- A. Papa - G. Panico, Storia sociale del calcio in Italia, Bologna 2002, p. 208; D. Buzzati, Il giornale segreto, Milano 2006, p. 35;
- M. Canella, Sport e fascismo, a cura di S. Giuntini, Milano 2009, ad indicem.
