= Paolo Scheidler =

Italian footballer and manager

Personal information
- Date of birth: 26 February 1891
- Place of birth: Milan, Italy
- Date of death: 3 January 1977 (aged 85)
- Place of death: Milan, Italy
- Position: Midfielder

Senior career*
| Years | Team | Apps | (Gls) |
| 1909–1910 | Firenze FC | 3 | (1) |
| 1910–1911 | Libertas Milano | 7 | (4) |
| 1911–1915 | Inter Milan | 48 | (2) |
| 1919–1923 | Inter Milan | 44 | (14) |

Managerial career
- 1924–1926: Inter Milan
- * Club domestic league appearances and goals

Paolo Scheidler (26 February 1891 – 3 January 1977) was an Italian association football midfielder and manager.

== Career ==
Born in Milan, at the age of 20 Scheidler was contracted by Inter Milan. He contributed to the club's second league title. He later also coached Inter Milan.
