= 1990–91 Juventus FC season =

Italian football club season

Juventus
1990–91 season
- Owner: Agnelli family
- President: Vittorio Chiusano
- Manager: Luigi Maifredi
- Stadium: Stadio Delle Alpi
- Serie A: 7th
- Supercoppa Italiana: Runners-up
- Coppa Italia: Quarter-finals
- European Cup Winners' Cup: Semi-finals
- Top goalscorer: League: Roberto Baggio (14); All: Roberto Baggio (27)
Home colours	Away colours	Third colours

Juventus Football Club had their least successful season since finishing 12th in the Serie A back in 1961–62. This time, under Luigi Maifredi's coaching, Juventus finished 7th, despite breaking the world record in terms of transfer fee, to bring in Fiorentina star striker Roberto Baggio. Being long involved in the Scudetto race, Juventus lost the plot in the second half of the season, barely winning a match in a ten-game spell, which caused the side to drop down to the upper midfield.

== Squad ==
Note: Flags indicate national team as defined under FIFA eligibility rules; some limited exceptions apply. Players may hold more than one non-FIFA nationality.

Pos.	Nation	Player
GK	ITA	Stefano Tacconi (captain)
GK	ITA	Adriano Bonaiuti
GK	ITA	Davide Micillo
DF	ITA	Dario Bonetti
DF	ITA	Luigi De Agostini
DF	ITA	Marco De Marchi
DF	BRA	Júlio César
DF	ITA	Gianluca Luppi
DF	ITA	Nicolò Napoli
DF	ITA	Michele Serena
MF	ITA	Angelo Alessio

Pos.	Nation	Player
MF	ITA	Eugenio Corini
MF	ITA	Daniele Fortunato
MF	ITA	Roberto Galia
MF	GER	Thomas Häßler
MF	ITA	Giancarlo Marocchi
MF	ITA	Massimo Orlando
MF	ITA	Nicola Zanini
FW	ITA	Roberto Baggio
FW	ITA	Pierluigi Casiraghi
FW	ITA	Paolo Di Canio
FW	ITA	Salvatore Schillaci

=== Transfers ===
In
Pos.	Name	from	Type
FW	Roberto Baggio	Fiorentina	€12.9 million
MF	Thomas Häßler	1.FC Köln	-
DF	Julio Cesar	Montpellier HSC	-
MF	Eugenio Corini	Brescia Calcio	-
FW	Paolo Di Canio	S.S. Lazio	-
DF	Gianluca Luppi	Bologna F.C.	-
DF	Marco De Marchi	Bologna F.C.	-
MF	Massimo Orlando	Reggina	-

Out
Pos.	Name	To	Type
DF	Sergio Brio		retired
MF	Rui Barros	AS Monaco	
MF	Sergej Alejnikov	U.S. Lecce	
FW	Oleksandr Zavarov	AS Nancy	
FW	Federico Giampaolo	Spezia Calcio	
MF	Salvatore Avallone	U.S. Avellino 1912	
DF	Roberto Tricella	Bologna F.C.	
DF	Pasquale Bruno	Torino	

== Competitions ==
=== Supercoppa Italiana ===
1 September 1990	Napoli	5–1	Juventus	Naples, Italy
20:45 CET	Silenzi 8', 45'; Careca 20', 71'; Crippa 44'		39' Baggio	Stadium: San Paolo; Attendance: 62,404; Referee: Carlo Longhi

=== Serie A ===
==== League table ====
Pos	Team	Pld	W	D	L	GF	GA	GD	Pts	Qualification or relegation
5	Torino	34	12	14	8	40	29	+11	38	Qualification to UEFA Cup
6	Parma (Note: Parma qualified for the 1991–92 UEFA Cup as a substitute for the banned Milan.)	34	13	12	9	35	31	+4	38	Qualification to UEFA Cup
7	Juventus	34	13	11	10	45	32	+13	37	
8	Napoli	34	11	15	8	37	37	0	37	
9	Roma	34	11	14	9	43	37	+6	36	Qualification to Cup Winners' Cup

Source: 1990–91 Serie A, RSSSF.com
Rules for classification: 1) Points; 2) Head-to-head points; 3) Head-to-head goal difference; 4) Goal difference; 5) Goals scored; 6) Draw.

==== Results by round ====
Round	1	2	3	4	5	6	7	8	9	10	11	12	13	14	15	16	17	18	19	20	21	22	23	24	25	26	27	28	29	30	31	32	33	34
Ground	A	H	A	H	A	H	H	A	H	A	H	A	H	A	H	A	H	H	A	H	A	H	A	A	H	A	H	A	H	A	H	A	H	A
Result	W	D	D	D	W	D	W	W	W	L	W	D	D	L	W	W	L	W	D	W	L	D	L	L	D	W	W	L	L	D	L	D	W	L
Position	1	4	5	4	2	4	2	2	2	3	1	2	2	3	2	1	2	2	4	3	4	4	4	4	5	4	4	4	4	4	7	6	5	7

Source: Competitive matches
A = Away; H = Home; W = Win; D = Draw; L = Loss; = 1991–92 European Cup; = 1991–92 UEFA Cup; = Relegation to 1991–92 Serie B

==== Matches ====
9 September 1990 1	Parma	1–2	Juventus	Parma
16:00 CEST	Melli 88' (pen.)	Report	Napoli 24'; Baggio 62' (pen.)	Stadium: Ennio Tardini; Referee: Lanese

16 September 1990 2	Juventus	1–1	Atalanta	Turin
16:00 CEST	Baggio 26' (pen.)	Report	Evair 77' (pen.)	Stadium: delle Alpi; Referee: Fabricatore

23 September 1990 3	Cesena	1–1	Juventus	Genoa
15:00 CEST	Pierleoni 48'	Report	35' (pen.) Baggio; (yellow card) 89' (yellow-red card) Hässler	Referee: Beschin

30 September 1990 4	Juventus	0–0	Sampdoria	Turin
15:00 CEST		Report		Stadium: delle Alpi; Referee: Beschin

7 October 1990 5	Lecce	0–1	Juventus	Lecce
15:00 CEST		Report	Di Canio 83'	Stadium: Via del Mare; Referee: Sguizzato

21 October 1990 6	Juventus	0–0	Lazio	Turin
14:30 CEST		Report		Stadium: delle Alpi; Referee: Pietro D'Elia

28 October 1990 7	Juventus	4–2	Internazionale	Turin
14:30 CEST	Baggio 2' (pen.); Casiraghi 15'; Schillaci 57'; De Agostini 64'	Report	Matthäus 34'; Klinsmann 80'	Stadium: delle Alpi; Referee: Arcangelo Pezzella

11 November 1990 8	Bologna	0–1	Juventus	Bologna
14:30 CET	Detari (penalty missed) 72'	Report	65' (pen.) Baggio	Stadium: Renato Dall'Ara; Referee: Fabio Baldas
Note: At minute 72 Stefano Tacconi blocked a penalty shoot-out by Lajos Detari.

18 November 1990 9	Juventus	5–0	Roma	Turin
14:30 CET	Schillaci 23', 29', 61'; Aldair 55' (o.g.); Baggio 90'	Report		Stadium: delle Alpi; Referee: Stafoggia

25 November 1990 10	Bari	2–0	Juventus	Bari
14:30 CET	Soda 8'; De Marchi 31' (o.g.)	Report		Stadium: della Vittoria; Referee: Frattamaggiore

2 December 1990 11	Juventus	2–1	Fiorentina	Turin
14:30 CET	Alessio 26', 35'	Report	Orlando 8'	Stadium: delle Alpi; Referee: Angelo Amendiola

10 December 1990 12	Torino	1–1	Juventus	Turin
14:30 CET	Policano 24'	Report	Baggio 77'	Stadium: delle Alpi; Referee: Sergio Coppetelli

16 December 1990 13	Juventus	2–2	Cagliari	Turin
14:30 CET	Di Canio 15'; Marocchi 20'	Report	Carnocchia 35'; Cappioli 73'	Stadium: delle Alpi; Referee: Graziano Cesari

30 December 1990 14	Milan	2–0	Juventus	Milan
14:30 CET	Ancelotti 46'; Gullit 55'	Report		Stadium: San Siro; Referee: Beschin

6 January 1991 15	Juventus	1–0	Napoli	Turin
14:30 CET	Casiraghi 87'	Report		Stadium: delle Alpi; Referee: Baldas

13 January 1991 16	Pisa	1–5	Juventus	Pisa
	Simeone 59'	Report	Casiraghi 20', 49', 73'; Baggio 37', 80'	Stadium: Arena Garibaldi; Referee: Amendiola

20 January 1991 17	Juventus	0–1	Genoa	Turin
14:30 CET		Report	Skuhravý 37'	Stadium: delle Alpi; Referee: Ceccarini

27 January 1991 18	Juventus	5–0	Parma	Turin
14:30 CET	Júlio César 24'; Casiraghi 57'; Marocchi 73'; Baggio 85', 87'	Report		Stadium: delle Alpi; Referee: Coppetelli

3 February 1991 19	Atalanta	0–0	Juventus	Bergamo
14:30 CET		Report		Stadium: Comunale; Referee: D'Elia

10 February 1991 20	Juventus	3–0	Cesena	Turin
14:30 CET	Fortunato 5'; Casiraghi 73'; De Agostini 88'	Report		Stadium: delle Alpi; Referee: Nicchi

17 February 1991 21	Sampdoria	1–0	Juventus	Genoa
14:30 CET	Vialli 50' (pen.)	Report		Stadium: Luigi Ferraris; Referee: Amendiola

24 February 1991 22	Juventus	0–0	Lecce	Turin
14:30 CET		Report		Stadium: delle Alpi

3 March 1991 23	Lazio	1–0	Juventus	Rome
15:00 CET	Riedle 35'	Report		Stadium: Olimpico; Referee: Sguizzato

10 March 1991 24	Internazionale	2–0	Juventus	Milan
15:00 CET	Matthäus 36'; Battistini 49'	Report		Stadium: Giuseppe Meazza; Referee: Beschin

17 March 1991 25	Juventus	1–1	Bologna	Turin
15:00 CET	Baggio 90' (pen.)	Report	Waas 31'	Stadium: delle Alpi; Referee: Bazzoli

24 March 1991 26	Roma	0–1	Juventus	Rome
15:00 CET		Report	Casiraghi 47'	Stadium: Olimpico; Referee: Werther Cornieti

30 March 1991 27	Juventus	3–1	Bari	Turin
15:00 CET	Häßler 45'; Marocchi 80'; Corini 90'	Report	Júlio César 9' (o.g.)	Stadium: delle Alpi; Referee: Quartuccio

6 April 1991 28	Fiorentina	1–0	Juventus	Florence
16:00 CEST	Fuser 41'	Report	75' De Agostini	Stadium: Comunale; Referee: Lo Bello

14 April 1991 29	Juventus	1–2	Torino	Turin
16:00 CEST	Di Canio 50'	Report	Policano 28'; Fortunato 73' (o.g.)	Stadium: delle Alpi; Referee: Sguizzato

20 April 1991 30	Cagliari	0–0	Juventus	Cagliari
16:00 CEST		Report		Stadium: Sant'Elia; Referee: Lanese

4 May 1991 31	Juventus	0–3	Milan	Turin
16:00 CEST		Report	Simone 3'; Maldini 13'; Evani 78'	Stadium: delle Alpi; Referee: Luciano Luci

12 May 1991 32	Napoli	1–1	Juventus	Naples
16:00 CEST	Silenzi 32'	Report	Alessio 54'	Stadium: San Paolo; Referee: Coppetelli

18 May 1991 33	Juventus	4–2	Pisa	Turin
16:00 CEST	Schillaci 10'; Baggio 39', 55'; Alessio 70'	Report	Neri 69'; Simeone 79'	Stadium: delle Alpi; Referee: Cinciripini

26 May 1991 34	Genoa	2–0	Juventus	Genoa
16:00 CEST	Branco 20'; Skuhravý 46'	Report		Stadium: Luigi Ferraris; Referee: Luci

=== Coppa Italia ===
Second round

5 September 1990	Juventus	2–0	Taranto	Turin
20:30 CEST	Baggio 40' (pen.); Casiraghi 80'	Report		Stadium: delle Alpi; Referee: Felicani

12 September 1990	Taranto	2–1	Juventus	Taranto
16:00 CEST	Turrini 43'; Brunetti 76'	Report	23' Alessio	Stadium: Stadio Erasmo Iacovone; Referee: Pezzella

Eightfinals

14 November 1990	Juventus	3–2	Pisa	Turin
14:30 CET	Alessio 15'; Baggio 34' (pen.); Häßler 80'	Report	9' Neri; 63' Larsen	Stadium: delle Alpi; Referee: Cardona

21 November 1990	Pisa	1–2	Juventus	Pisa
14:00 CET	Piovanelli 89'	Report	7' (o.g.) Argentesi; 14' (pen.) Baggio	Stadium: Stadio Arena Garibaldi; Referee: Cornieti

Quarterfinals

7 February 1991	Roma	1–1	Juventus	Rome
20:30 CET	Bonetti I 45' (o.g.)	Report	56' Casiraghi	Stadium: Olimpico; Referee: Beschin

20 February 1991	Juventus	0–2 (1–3 agg.)	Roma	Turin
20:30 CET		Report	35' Berthold; 44' Rizzitelli	Stadium: delle Alpi; Referee: Pezzella

=== European Cup Winners' Cup ===
==== First round ====
19 September 1990 1	Sliven (Bulgaria)	0–2	(Italy) Juventus	Sliven, Bulgaria
			Schillaci 25'; Baggio 90' (pen.)	Stadium: Hadzhi Dimitar Stadium; Attendance: 17,600

3 October 1990 2	Juventus (Italy)	6–1 (8–1 agg.)	(Bulgaria) Sliven	Turin, Italy
	Baggio 15' (pen.), 18'; Schillaci 25'; Corini 49'; Bonetti 53'; Júlio César 56'		Kelepov 84'	Stadium: Stadio delle Alpi; Attendance: 10,000

==== Second round ====
24 October 1990 1	Austria Wien	0–4	(Italy) Juventus	Vienna, Austria
			Casiraghi 30', 45'; Baggio 48'; Schillaci 69' (pen.)	Stadium: Franz Horr Stadium; Attendance: 12,000

7 November 1990 2	Juventus (Italy)	4–0 (8–0 agg.)	Austria Wien	Turin, Italy
	Alessio 3'; Baggio 25' (pen.), 46', 52'			Stadium: Stadio delle Alpi; Attendance: 19,000

==== Quarter-finals ====
6 March 1991 1	Liège (Belgium)	1–3	(Italy) Juventus	Liège, Belgium
	Houben 83'		Marocchi 32'; Baggio 43'; Júlio César 48'	Stadium: Stade du Pairay; Attendance: 23,000; Referee: (Germany) Aron Schmidhuber

20 March 1991 2	Juventus (Italy)	3–0 (6–1 agg.)	(Belgium) Liège	Turin, Italy
	Casiraghi 9'; Wégria 18' (o.g.); Häßler 22'			Stadium: Stadio delle Alpi; Attendance: 33,500; Referee: (Wales) Howard King

==== Semi-finals ====
10 April 1991 1	Barcelona (Spain)	3–1	(Italy) Juventus	Barcelona, Spain
	Stoichkov 55', 60'; Goikoetxea 75'		Casiraghi 12'	Stadium: Camp Nou; Attendance: 110,000; Referee: (France) Joël Quiniou

24 April 1991 2	Juventus (Italy)	1–0 (2–3 agg.)	(Spain) Barcelona	Turin, Italy
	Baggio 60'			Stadium: Stadio delle Alpi; Attendance: 64,469; Referee: (Switzerland) Kurt Röthlisberger

== Statistics ==
=== Players Statistics ===
No.	Pos	Nat	Player	Total		Serie A		Coppa		Cup Winners' Cup	
No.	Pos	Nat	Player	Apps	Goals	Apps	Goals	Apps	Goals	Apps	Goals
	GK	(Italy) ITA	Tacconi	48	-45	34	-32	6	-8	8	-5
	DF	(Italy) ITA	Luppi	34	0	23+1	0	5	0	5	0
	DF	(Brazil) BRA	Júlio César	41	2	29	1	4	0	8	1
	DF	(Italy) ITA	De Agostini	43	2	32	2	4	0	7	0
	MF	(Italy) ITA	Fortunato	33	1	22+2	1	3	0	6	0
	MF	(Germany) GER	Hässler	44	3	32	1	4	1	8	1
	MF	(Italy) ITA	Marocchi	44	3	31	3	6	0	7	0
	MF	(Italy) ITA	Corini	35	1	17+8	1	5	0	5	0
	FW	(Italy) ITA	Casiraghi	34	14	20+4	8	4	2	6	4
	FW	(Italy) ITA	Schillaci	41	8	28+1	5	5	0	7	3
	FW	(Italy) ITA	Baggio	46	26	33	14	5	3	8	9
	GK	(Italy) ITA	Bonaiuti	0	0	0	0	0	0	0	0
	MF	(Italy) ITA	Galia	32	0	16+7	0	3	0	6	0
	DF	(Italy) ITA	Napoli	30	1	16+4	1	4	0	6	0
	DF	(Italy) ITA	De Marchi	24	0	16+1	0	4	0	3	0
	FW	(Italy) ITA	Di Canio	34	3	9+14	3	6	0	5	0
	MF	(Italy) ITA	Alessio	31	7	8+14	4	5	2	4	1
	DF	(Italy) ITA	Bonetti	18	0	8+3	0	3	0	4	0
	MF	(Italy) ITA	Zanini	1	0	0+1	0				
	GK	(Italy) ITA	Micillo	0	0	0	0				
	DF	(Italy) ITA	Serena	0	0	0	0				
	MF	(Italy) ITA	Orlando	2	0	0	0	1	0	1	0
	MF	(Italy) ITA	Pasino	0	0	0	0				

- Source: http://calcio-seriea.net/presenze/1990/1009/
