= 1989–90 Juventus FC season =

Italian football club season

Juventus
1989–90 season
- Owner: Agnelli family
- President: Giampiero Boniperti (until 5 February 1990); Vittorio Chiusano
- Head Coach: Dino Zoff
- Stadium: Comunale
- Serie A: 4th
- Coppa Italia: Champions
- UEFA Cup: Champions
- Top goalscorer: Salvatore Schillaci (15)
Home colours	Away colours

Juventus Football Club finished in 4th place in the league this season, but won the Coppa Italia and the UEFA Cup.

== Squad ==
Note: Flags indicate national team as defined under FIFA eligibility rules; some limited exceptions apply. Players may hold more than one non-FIFA nationality.

Pos.	Nation	Player
GK	ITA	Stefano Tacconi
GK	ITA	Adriano Bonaiuti
GK	ITA	Davide Micillo
DF	ITA	Luigi De Agostini
DF	ITA	Dario Bonetti
DF	ITA	Nicolò Napoli
DF	ITA	Pasquale Bruno
DF	ITA	Roberto Tricella
DF	ITA	Sergio Brio (captain)
DF	ITA	Massimiliano Rosa
DF	ITA	Michele Serena

Pos.	Nation	Player
MF	ITA	Giancarlo Marocchi
MF	URS	Sergei Aleinikov
MF	ITA	Roberto Galia
MF	URS	Oleksandr Zavarov
MF	ITA	Angelo Alessio
MF	ITA	Daniele Fortunato
MF	ITA	Salvatore Avallone
FW	ITA	Salvatore Schillaci
FW	ITA	Pierluigi Casiraghi
FW	POR	Rui Barros
FW	ITA	Federico Giampaolo

=== Transfers ===
In
Pos.	Name	from	Type
MF	Sergei Aleinikov	Dynamo Minsk	
FW	Salvatore Schillaci	ACR Messina	
MF	Angelo Alessio	Bologna FC	loan ended
FW	Pierluigi Casiraghi	AC Monza	
GK	Adriano Bonaiuti	Sambenedettese	
GK	Davide Micillo		
DF	Dario Bonetti	Hellas Verona	
DF	Massimiliano Rosa	Venezia FC	
DF	Michele Serena	Venezia FC	
DF	Daniele Fortunato	Atalanta BC	
FW	Federico Giampaolo	Giulianova	

Out
Pos.	Name	to	Type
DF	Antonio Cabrini		retired
FW	Michael Laudrup	FC Barcelona	
FW	Alessandro Altobelli	Brescia	
MF	Massimo Mauro	Napoli	
FW	Renato Buso	Fiorentina	
MF	Marino Magrin	Hellas Verona	
DF	Luciano Favero	Hellas Verona	
GK	Luciano Bodini	Hellas Verona	

== Competitions ==
=== Serie A ===
==== League table ====
Pos	Team	Pld	W	D	L	GF	GA	GD	Pts	Qualification or relegation
2	Milan (Note: Milan qualified for the 1990–91 European Cup as defending champions.)	34	22	5	7	56	27	+29	49	Qualification to European Cup
3	Internazionale	34	17	10	7	55	32	+23	44	Qualification to UEFA Cup
4	Juventus	34	15	14	5	56	36	+20	44	Qualification to Cup Winners' Cup
5	Sampdoria (Note: Sampdoria qualified for the 1990–91 European Cup Winners' Cup as defending champions.)	34	16	11	7	46	26	+20	43	Qualification to Cup Winners' Cup
6	Roma	34	14	13	7	45	40	+5	41	Qualification to UEFA Cup

Source: 1989–90 Serie A, RSSSF.com
Rules for classification: 1) Points; 2) Head-to-head points; 3) Head-to-head goal difference; 4) Goal difference; 5) Goals scored; 6) Draw.

==== Results by round ====
Round	1	2	3	4	5	6	7	8	9	10	11	12	13	14	15	16	17	18	19	20	21	22	23	24	25	26	27	28	29	30	31	32	33	34
Ground	H	A	H	H	A	H	A	H	A	H	A	A	H	A	H	A	H	A	H	A	A	H	A	H	A	H	A	H	H	A	H	A	H	A
Result	D	W	W	W	L	W	D	L	W	W	L	D	D	D	D	L	W	D	W	D	W	W	D	W	W	D	D	W	D	L	W	D	D	W
Position	11	2	1	1	5	4	3	6	4	3	3	3	6	5	7	7	7	7	7	6	5	5	5	5	3	4	3	3	3	4	4	4	4	4

Source: Competitive matches
A = Away; H = Home; W = Win; D = Draw; L = Loss; = 1990–91 European Cup; = 1990–91 UEFA Cup; = Relegation to 1990–91 Serie B

==== Matches ====
27 August 1989 1	Juventus	1–1	Bologna	Turin
	Marocchi 13'	Report	Poli 40'	Stadium: Comunale; Referee: Coppetelli

3 September 1989 2	Verona	1–4	Juventus	Verona
	Iorio 78'	Report	Schillaci 4' 11'; Fortunato 48'; Marocchi 56'	Stadium: Marcantonio Bentegodi; Referee: Lanese

6 September 1989 3	Juventus	3–1	Fiorentina	Turin
	Casiraghi 25'; Schillaci 67'; Alessio 90'	Report	Kubík 37'	Stadium: Comunale

10 September 1989 4	Juventus	3–1	Ascoli	Turin
	Zavarov 1'; Bonetti 22'; Sabato 70' (o.g.)	Report	Casagrande 53'	Stadium: Comunale; Referee: Sguizzato

17 September 1989 5	Internazionale	2–1	Juventus	Milan
	Matthäus 36'; Klinsmann 46'	Report	Marocchi 58'	Stadium: Giuseppe Meazza; Referee: D'Elia

24 September 1989 6	Juventus	1–0	Bari	Turin
15:00 CEST	Schillaci 42'	Report		Stadium: Comunale; Referee: Cornieti

1 October 1989 7	Lazio	1–1	Juventus	Rome
	Di Canio 38'	Report	De Agostini 53' (pen.)	Stadium: Olimpico; Referee: Agnolin

8 October 1989 8	Juventus	0–1	Atalanta	Turin
15:00 CET		Report	Caniggia 74'	Stadium: Comunale; Referee: Baldas

22 October 1989 9	Genoa	2–3	Juventus	Genoa
14:30 CET	Aguilera 20'; Fortunato 41' (o.g.)	Report	Schillaci 11'; Schillaci 21'; Aleinikov 49'	Stadium: Luigi Ferraris; Referee: Lanese

29 October 1989 10	Juventus	1–0	Sampdoria	Turin
14:30 CEST	Aleinikov 34'	Report		Stadium: Comunale

5 November 1989 11	Milan	3–2	Juventus	Milan
14:30 CET	van Basten 52' (pen.), 85'; Donadoni 78'	Report	De Agostini 62' (pen.); Schillaci 65'	Stadium: San Siro; Referee: Agnolin

19 November 1989 12	Udinese	2–2	Juventus	Udine
14:30 CET	Orlando 77'; Branca 82'	Report	Zavarov 23'; Fortunato 64'	Stadium: Friuli; Referee: Longhi

26 November 1989 13	Juventus	1–1	Napoli	Turin
14:30 CET	Bonetti 73'	Report	Crippa 16'	Stadium: Comunale; Referee: Lanese

3 December 1989 14	Cremonese	2–2	Juventus	Cremona
14:30 CET	Citterio 8'; Gualco 20'	Report	Alessio 30'; Schillaci 34'	Stadium: Giovanni Zini; Referee: D'Elia

10 December 1989 15	Juventus	1–1	Cesena	Turin
14:30 CET	Fortunato 35'	Report	Domini 58'	Stadium: Comunale; Referee: Baldas

17 December 1989 16	Roma	1–0	Juventus	Rome
14:30 CET	Desideri 68'	Report		Stadium: Olimpico; Referee: Agnolin

30 December 1989 17	Juventus	3–0	Lecce	Turin
14:30 CET	Schillaci 27' 90'; De Agostini 79' (pen.)	Report		Stadium: Comunale; Referee: Paolo Fabricatore

7 January 1990 18	Bologna	1–1	Juventus	Bologna
14:30 CET	Waas 28'	Report	Bonetti 56' (o.g.)	Stadium: Renato Dall'Ara; Referee: Tullio Lanese

14 January 1990 19	Juventus	2–1	Verona	Turin
14:30 CET	Marocchi 30'; Schillaci 83'	Report	Iorio 29'	Stadium: Comunale; Referee: Bruno Di Cola

17 January 1990 20	Fiorentina	2–2	Juventus	Florence
	Baggio 63' (pen.); Battistini 72'	Report	Napoli 2'; Zavarov 17'	Stadium: Comunale

21 January 1990 21	Ascoli	1–2	Juventus	Ascoli Piceno
14:30 CEST	Casagrande 50' (pen.)	Report	Brio 2'; De Agostini 19' (pen.)	Stadium: Cino e Lillo Del Duca; Referee: Luciano Luci

28 January 1990 22	Juventus	1–0	Internazionale	Turin
14:30 CEST	Napoli 71'	Report		Stadium: Comunale; Referee: Agnolin

4 February 1990 23	Bari	1–1	Juventus	Bari
14:30 CEST	Maiellaro 89' (pen.)	Report	Schillaci 40' (pen.)	Stadium: della Vittoria; Referee: Pietro D'Elia

11 February 1990 24	Juventus	1–0	Lazio	Turin
14:30 CEST	Casiraghi 72'	Report		Stadium: Comunale; Referee: Angelo Amendiola

18 February 1990 25	Atalanta	1–2	Juventus	Bergamo
14:30 CET	Bordin 75'	Report	Aleinikov 18'; Marocchi 57'	Stadium: Comunale; Referee: Cornieti

25 February 1990 26	Juventus	1–1	Genoa	Turin
14:30 CET	Galia 4'	Report	Aleinikov 35' (o.g.)	Stadium: Comunale; Referee: Pierluigi Magni

4 March 1990 27	Sampdoria	0–0	Juventus	Genoa
15:00 CET		Report		Stadium: Luigi Ferraris; Referee: Luciano Luci

11 March 1990 28	Juventus	3–0	Milan	Turin
15:00 CEST	Schillaci 7'; Rui Barros 18, 58'	Report		Stadium: Comunale; Referee: Carlo Longhi

18 March 1990 29	Juventus	1–1	Udinese	Turin
	Zavarov 12'	Report	Branca 10'	Stadium: Comunale; Referee: Piero Ceccarini

25 March 1990 30	Napoli	3–1	Juventus	Naples
16:00 CEST	Maradona 13, 28'; Francini 64'	Report	De Agostini 61' (pen.)	Stadium: San Paolo; Referee: Carlo Longhi

8 April 1990 31	Juventus	4–0	Cremonese	Turin
16:00 CEST	Napoli 2'; Schillaci 20'; Alessio 26'; Casiraghi 63'	Report		Stadium: Comunale; Referee: Fabio Baldas

14 April 1990 32	Cesena	1–1	Juventus	Cesena
16:00 CEST	Del Bianco 57'	Report	Bonetti 72'	Stadium: Dino Manuzzi; Referee: Pierluigi Magni

22 April 1990 33	Juventus	1–1	Roma	Turin
16:00 CET	Casiraghi 68'	Report	Völler 64'	Stadium: Comunale; Referee: Gianni Beschin

28 April 1990 34	Lecce	2–3	Juventus	Lecce
16:00 CEST	Pasculli 74'; Vincze 89'	Report	Schillaci 22'; Zavarov 57'; Garzya 75' (o.g.)	Stadium: Via del Mare; Referee: Robert Boggi

=== Coppa Italia ===
First round

23 August 1989	Cagliari	0–1	Juventus	Cagliari
17:00 CEST		Report	108' Zavarov	Stadium: Sant'Elia; Referee: Magni

Second round

30 August 1989	Juventus	2–1	Taranto	Turin
20:30 CEST	Schillaci 21'; Zavarov 42'	Report	71' Giacchetta	Stadium: Comunale; Referee: Nicchi

Group phase

10 January 1990 1	Pescara	0–1	Juventus	Pescara
20:30 CEST		Report	13' Zavarov	Stadium: Adriatico; Referee: Cornieti

24 January 1990 2	Juventus	2–1	Sampdoria	Turin
14:30 CEST	Marocchi 6'; De Agostini 87' (pen.)	Report	22' Katanec	Stadium: Comunale; Referee: Lanese

Semifinals

31 January 1990	Juventus	2–0	Roma	Turin
14:30 CEST	Casiraghi 5', 85'	Report		Stadium: Comunale; Referee: Sguizzato

14 February 1990	Roma	3–2	Juventus	Rome
14:30 CEST	Di Mauro 9'; Bonetti I 27' (o.g.); Tempestilli 73'	Report	51' Alessio; 64' Schillaci	Stadium: Olimpico; Referee: Agnolin L.

==== Final ====
28 February 1990	Juventus	0–0	Milan	Turin
20:30 CEST		Report		Stadium: Comunale; Referee: Pietro D'Elia

25 April 1990	Milan	0–1	Juventus	Milan
16:00 CEST		Report	17' Galia	Stadium: Giuseppe Meazza; Referee: Pietro D'Elia

=== UEFA Cup ===
First round

12 September 1989 1	Górnik Zabrze (Poland)	0–1	(Italy) Juventus	Zabrze, Poland
			Zavarov 72'

27 September 1989 2	Juventus (Italy)	4–2 (5–2 agg.)	(Poland) Górnik Zabrze	Turin, Italy
	Schillaci 2' 25'; Fortunato 4'; Marocchi 6'		Koseła 43'; Lissek 82'	Stadium: Stadio Olimpico di Torino

Second round

18 October 1989 1	Paris Saint-Germain (France)	0–1	(Italy) Juventus	Paris, France
			Rui Barros 65'	Stadium: Parc des Princes

1 November 1989 2	Juventus (Italy)	2–1 (3–1 agg.)	(France) Paris Saint-Germain	Turin, Italy
	Galia 26'; Bosser 83' (o.g.)		Bravo 30'	Stadium: Comunale

Third round

22 November 1989 1	Juventus (Italy)	2–1	(East Germany) FC Karl-Marx-Stadt	Turin, Italy
	Schillaci 82'; Casiraghi 88'		Wienhold 70'	Stadium: Stadio Olimpico di Torino

6 December 1989 2	FC Karl-Marx-Stadt (East Germany)	0–1 (1–3 agg.)	(Italy) Juventus	Karl-Marx-Stadt, East Germany
			De Agostini 20'

Quarterfinals

7 March 1990 1	Hamburger SV (West Germany)	0–2	(Italy) Juventus	Hamburg, Germany
			Schillaci 51'; Casiraghi 58'	Stadium: Volksparkstadion

21 March 1990 2	Juventus (Italy)	1–2 (3–2 agg.)	(West Germany) Hamburger SV	Turin, Italy
	Galia 34'		Furtok 72'; Merkle 78'	Stadium: Comunale

Semifinals

4 April 1990 1	Juventus (Italy)	3–2	(West Germany) Köln	Turin, Italy
	Rui Barros 22'; Higl 45' (o.g.); Marocchi 53'		Götz 80'; Sturm 90'	Stadium: Comunale

18 April 1990 2	Köln (West Germany)	0–0 (2–3 agg.)	(Italy) Juventus	Cologne, Germany
				Stadium: Müngersdorfer Stadion

==== Final ====
2 May 1990 1	Juventus (Italy)	3–1	(Italy) Fiorentina	Turin, Italy
	Galia 3'; Casiraghi 59'; De Agostini 73'		Buso 10'	Stadium: Stadio Olimpico di Torino; Attendance: 47,519; Referee: (Spain) Emilio Soriano Aladrén

16 May 1990 2	Fiorentina (Italy)	0–0 (1–3 agg.)	(Italy) Juventus	Avellino, Italy
				Stadium: Stadio Partenio; Attendance: 30,999; Referee: (West Germany) Aron Schmidhuber

== Statistics ==
=== Players statistics ===
No.	Pos	Nat	Player	Total		Serie A		Coppa		UEFA	
No.	Pos	Nat	Player	Apps	Goals	Apps	Goals	Apps	Goals	Apps	Goals
	GK	(Italy) ITA	Stefano Tacconi	53	-50	33	-36	8	-5	12	-9
	DF	(Italy) ITA	Dario Bonetti	44	3	28	3	7	0	9	0
	DF	(Italy) ITA	Roberto Tricella	28	0	19	0	7	0	2	0
	DF	(Italy) ITA	Luigi De Agostini	53	8	33	5	8	1	12	2
	MF	(Soviet Union) URS	Oleksandr Zavarov	41	9	27+1	5	6	3	7	1
	MF	(Italy) ITA	Giancarlo Marocchi	51	8	32	5	8	1	11	2
	MF	(Italy) ITA	Roberto Galia	47	5	28+3	1	5	1	11	3
	MF	(Italy) ITA	Angelo Alessio	38	4	16+9	3	7	1	6	0
	MF	(Soviet Union) URS	Sergei Aleinikov	50	3	30	3	8	0	12	0
	FW	(Italy) ITA	Salvatore Schillaci	50	21	30	15	8	2	12	4
	FW	(Portugal) POR	Rui Barros	50	4	31	2	7	0	12	2
	GK	(Italy) ITA	Adriano Bonaiuti	1	0	1	0	0	0	0	0
	MF	(Italy) ITA	Daniele Fortunato	28	4	18+1	3	3	0	6	1
	DF	(Italy) ITA	Nicolò Napoli	33	5	17+2	5	7	0	7	0
	DF	(Italy) ITA	Pasquale Bruno	29	0	12+7	0	2	0	8	0
	FW	(Italy) ITA	Pierluigi Casiraghi	42	10	11+12	4	8	2	11	4
	DF	(Italy) ITA	Sergio Brio	25	1	8+7	1	2	0	8	0
	DF	(Italy) ITA	Michele Serena	5	0	0+4	0	0	0	1	0
	MF	(Italy) ITA	Salvatore Avallone	4	0	0+2	0	0	0	2	0
	GK	(Italy) ITA	Davide Micillo	0	0	0	0	0	0		
	DF	(Italy) ITA	Massimiliano Rosa	1	0	0	0	0	0	1	0
	FW	(Italy) ITA	Federico Giampaolo	0	0	0	0				

- Source: http://calcio-seriea.net/formazioni/1989/992/
