= 1991–92 Juventus FC season =

Italian football club season

Juventus
1991–92 season
- President: Vittorio Caissotti di Chiusano
- Head Coach: Giovanni Trapattoni
- Stadium: Delle Alpi
- Serie A: 2nd (in 1992–93 UEFA Cup)
- Coppa Italia: Runners-up
- Top goalscorer: League: Roberto Baggio (18); All: Roberto Baggio (22)
- Highest home attendance: 62,867 vs Milan (15 September 1991)
- Lowest home attendance: 40,509 vs Hellas Verona (19 January 1992)
- Average home league attendance: 49,559
Home colours	Away colours	Third colours

Juventus Football Club finished second in Serie A and reached the final of the Coppa Italia in this season.

== Squad ==
Note: Flags indicate national team as defined under FIFA eligibility rules; some limited exceptions apply. Players may hold more than one non-FIFA nationality.

Pos.	Nation	Player
GK	ITA	Stefano Tacconi (captain)
GK	ITA	Angelo Peruzzi
GK	ITA	Fabio Marchioro
DF	ITA	Massimo Carrera
DF	BRA	Júlio César
DF	GER	Jürgen Kohler
DF	ITA	Luigi De Agostini (vice-Captain)
DF	ITA	Gianluca Luppi
MF	ITA	Giancarlo Marocchi

Pos.	Nation	Player
MF	ITA	Roberto Galia
MF	GER	Stefan Reuter
MF	ITA	Angelo Alessio
MF	ITA	Eugenio Corini
MF	ITA	Antonio Conte
MF	ITA	Nicola Zanini
FW	ITA	Roberto Baggio
FW	ITA	Pierluigi Casiraghi
FW	ITA	Salvatore Schillaci
FW	ITA	Paolo Di Canio

=== Transfers ===
In
Pos.	Name	from	Type
GK	Angelo Peruzzi	A.S. Roma	
DF	Massimo Carrera	S.S.C. Bari	-
DF	Jürgen Kohler	Bayern München	-
MF	Stefan Reuter	Bayern München	-
MF	Antonio Conte	U.S. Lecce	-
MF	Dino Baggio	Torino	-

Out
Pos.	Name	To	Type
DF	Thomas Häßler	A.S. Roma	
GK	Adriano Bonaiuti	Calcio Padova	
GK	Davide Micillo	A.C. Ancona	
DF	Marco De Marchi	A.S. Roma	loan
MF	Dino Baggio	Inter	loan

== Competitions ==
=== Serie A ===
==== League table ====
Pos	Team	Pld	W	D	L	GF	GA	GD	Pts	Qualification or relegation
1	Milan (C)	34	22	12	0	74	21	+53	56	Qualification to European Cup
2	Juventus	34	18	12	4	45	22	+23	48	Qualification to UEFA Cup
3	Torino	34	14	15	5	42	20	+22	43	Qualification to UEFA Cup
4	Napoli	34	15	12	7	56	40	+16	42	Qualification to UEFA Cup
5	Roma	34	13	14	7	37	31	+6	40	Qualification to UEFA Cup

Source: 1991–92 Serie A, RSSSF.com
Rules for classification: 1) Points; 2) Head-to-head points; 3) Head-to-head goal difference; 4) Goal difference; 5) Goals scored; 6) Draw.
(C) Champions

==== Results by round ====
Round	1	2	3	4	5	6	7	8	9	10	11	12	13	14	15	16	17	18	19	20	21	22	23	24	25	26	27	28	29	30	31	32	33	34
Ground	H	A	H	A	H	A	A	H	A	H	A	H	H	A	H	A	H	A	H	A	H	A	H	H	A	H	A	H	A	A	H	A	H	A
Result	W	W	D	D	W	L	W	W	D	W	W	W	W	L	W	D	W	L	W	D	W	D	W	W	W	D	L	W	D	W	D	D	D	D
Position	1	1	1	1	1	2	1	1	2	2	2	2	2	2	2	2	2	2	2	2	2	2	2	2	2	2	2	2	2	2	2	2	2	2

Source: Competitive matches
A = Away; H = Home; W = Win; D = Draw; L = Loss; = 1992–93 European Cup; = 1992–93 UEFA Cup; = 1992–93 Serie B

==== Matches ====
1 September 1991 1	Juventus	1–0	Fiorentina	Turin
	Casiraghi 42'	Report		Stadium: Stadio delle Alpi

8 September 1991 2	Foggia	0–1	Juventus	Foggia
		Report	Schillaci 47'	Stadium: Stadio Pino Zaccheria

15 September 1991 3	Juventus	1–1	Milan	Turin
	Casiraghi 13'	Report	Carrera 90' (o.g.)	Stadium: Stadio delle Alpi

22 September 1991 4	Atalanta	0–0	Juventus	Bergamo
		Report		Stadium: Comunale

29 September 1991 5	Juventus	2–0	Bari	Turin
	Baggio 10' (pen.); Kohler 33'	Report		Stadium: Stadio delle Alpi

6 October 1991 6	Genoa	2–1	Juventus	Genoa
	Aguilera 60'; Bortolazzi 68'	Report	Corini 7' (pen.)	Stadium: Stadio Luigi Ferraris

20 October 1991 7	Napoli	0–1	Juventus	Naples
		Report	De Agostini 45'	Stadium: Stadio San Paolo

27 October 1991 8	Juventus	2–0	Cremonese	Turin
	Carrera 8'; Casiraghi 27'	Report		Stadium: Stadio delle Alpi

3 November 1991 9	Lazio	1–1	Juventus	Rome
	Riedle 72'	Report	Alessio 45'	Stadium: Stadio Olimpico

17 November 1991 10	Juventus	1–0	Torino	Turin
	Casiraghi 11'	Report		Stadium: Stadio delle Alpi

24 November 1991 11	Ascoli	0–2	Juventus	Ascoli Piceno
		Report	Kohler 1'; Casiraghi 61'	Stadium: Stadio Cino e Lillo Del Duca

1 December 1991 12	Juventus	2–1	Roma	Turin
	Schillaci 37'; De Marchi 88' (o.g.)	Report	Giannini 71'	Stadium: Stadio delle Alpi

8 December 1991 13	Juventus	2–1	Internazionale	Turin
	Baggio 37' (pen.); Galia 83'	Report	Matthäus 89' (pen.)	Stadium: Stadio delle Alpi

15 December 1991 14	Sampdoria	1–0	Juventus	Genoa
	Katanec 23'	Report		Stadium: Stadio Luigi Ferraris

5 January 1992 15	Juventus	1–0	Parma	Turin
	Baggio 71'	Report		Stadium: Stadio delle Alpi

12 January 1992 16	Cagliari	1–1	Juventus	Cagliari
	Firicano 30'	Report	Baggio 26'	Stadium: Stadio Sant'Elia

19 January 1992 17	Juventus	2–0	Verona	Turin
	Pellegrini 21' (o.g.); Schillaci 64'	Report		Stadium: Stadio delle Alpi

26 January 1992 18	Fiorentina	2–0	Juventus	Florence
	Batistuta 7'; Branca 90'	Report		Stadium: Stadio Artemio Franchi

2 February 1992 19	Juventus	4–1	Foggia	Turin
	Baggio 2' (pen.), 51' (pen.), 53'; Casiraghi 90'	Report	Petrescu 63'	Stadium: Stadio delle Alpi

9 February 1992 20	Milan	1–1	Juventus	Milan
	Van Basten 4'	Report	Casiraghi 26'	Stadium: San Siro

16 February 1992 21	Juventus	2–1	Atalanta	Turin
	Schillaci 24'; Baggio 51'	Report	Piovanelli 49'	Stadium: Stadio delle Alpi

23 February 1992 22	Bari	0–0	Juventus	Bari
		Report		Stadium: Stadio della Vittoria

1 March 1992 23	Juventus	3–0	Genoa	Turin
	Baggio 15', 85'; Ferroni 90' (o.g.)	Report		Stadium: Stadio delle Alpi

8 March 1992 24	Juventus	3–1	Napoli	Turin
	Baggio 3', 44'; Marocchi 54'	Report	Padovano 86'	Stadium: Stadio delle Alpi

15 March 1992 25	Cremonese	0–2	Juventus	Cremona
		Report	Júlio César 20'; Baggio 90'	Stadium: Stadio Giovanni Zini

29 March 1992 26	Juventus	1–1	Lazio	Turin
	Schillaci 90'	Report	Riedle 83'	Stadium: Stadio delle Alpi

5 April 1992 27	Torino	2–0	Juventus	Turin
	Casagrande 66', 73'	Report		Stadium: Stadio delle Alpi

12 April 1992 28	Juventus	1–0	Ascoli	Turin
	Baggio 53' (pen.)	Report		Stadium: Stadio delle Alpi

18 April 1992 29	Roma	1–1	Juventus	Rome
	Rizzitelli 57'	Report	Baggio 73'	Stadium: Stadio Olimpico

26 April 1992 30	Internazionale	1–3	Juventus	Milan
	Fontolan 62'	Report	Baggio 30' (pen.), 37'; Schillaci 54'	Stadium: San Siro

3 May 1992 31	Juventus	0–0	Sampdoria	Turin
		Report		Stadium: Stadio delle Alpi

10 May 1992 32	Parma	0–0	Juventus	Parma
		Report		Stadium: Stadio Ennio Tardini

17 May 1992 33	Juventus	0–0	Cagliari	Turin
		Report		Stadium: Stadio delle Alpi

24 May 1992 34	Verona	3–3	Juventus	Verona
	Pellegrini 4', 6'; Fanna 49'	Report	Alessio 10'; Baggio 56'; Kohler 90'	Stadium: Stadio Marcantonio Bentegodi

=== Coppa Italia ===
Round of 16

27 August 1991	Udinese	0–0	Juventus	Udine
				Stadium: Stadio Friuli; Referee: Carlo Sguizzato

3 September 1991	Juventus	3–0	Udinese	Turin
	Marocchi 43'; Baggio 53'; Casiraghi 77'			Stadium: Stadio delle Alpi; Referee: Loris Stafoggia

Eightfinals

29 October 1991	Atalanta	0–0	Juventus	Bergamo
				Stadium: Comunale; Referee: Luciano Luci

5 November 1991	Juventus	3–1	Atalanta	Turin
	Júlio César 44'; Corini 55' (pen.); Alessio 76'		Bigliardi 14'	Stadium: Stadio delle Alpi; Referee: Walter Cinciripini

Quarterfinals

11 February 1992	Juventus	1–0	Inter Milan	Turin
	Di Canio 47'			Stadium: Stadio delle Alpi; Referee: Angelo Amendolia

27 February 1992	Inter Milan	1–2 (2–2 a.e.t. agg.)	Juventus	Milan
	Ciocci 79'		Baggio 99', 120'	Stadium: San Siro; Referee: Tullio Lanese

Semifinals

31 March 1992	Milan	0–0	Juventus	Milan
				Stadium: San Siro; Referee: Pietro D'Elia

14 April 1992	Juventus	1–0	Milan	Turin
	Schillaci 22'			Stadium: Stadio delle Alpi; Referee: Angelo Amendolia

==== Final ====
7 May 1992 First leg	Juventus	1–0	Parma	Turin
20:30 CEST (UTC+02:00)	Baggio 23' (pen.); Júlio César (yellow card) 73'		Melli (yellow card) 45'	Stadium: Stadio delle Alpi; Attendance: 47,872; Referee: Rosario Lo Bello

14 May 1992	Parma	2–0 (1–2 agg.)	Juventus	Parma
20:30 CEST (UTC+02:00)	Melli 45'; Apolloni (yellow card) 50'; Osio 61'; Cuoghi (yellow card) 64'; Minotti (yellow card) 73'		De Agostini (yellow card) 17'; Schillaci (yellow card) 19'; Reuter (yellow card) 33'; Luppi (yellow card) 39'; Kohler (yellow card) 45'; Conte (red card) 88'	Stadium: Stadio Ennio Tardini; Attendance: 24,471; Referee: Fabio Baldas

== Statistics ==
=== Players Statistics ===
No.	Pos	Nat	Player	Total		Serie A		Coppa	
No.	Pos	Nat	Player	Apps	Goals	Apps	Goals	Apps	Goals
	GK	(Italy) ITA	Stefano Tacconi	32	-18	28	-17	4	-1
	DF	(Italy) ITA	Massimo Carrera	41	1	31	1	10	0
	DF	(Brazil) BRA	Júlio César	40	2	33	1	7	1
	DF	(Germany) GER	Jürgen Kohler	34	3	27	3	7	0
	DF	(Italy) ITA	Luigi De Agostini	34	1	22+3	1	9	0
	MF	(Germany) GER	Stefan Reuter	36	0	28	0	8	0
	MF	(Italy) ITA	Giancarlo Marocchi	41	2	28+3	1	10	1
	MF	(Italy) ITA	Roberto Galia	41	1	26+6	1	9	0
	FW	(Italy) ITA	Pierluigi Casiraghi	41	8	33	7	8	1
	FW	(Italy) ITA	Salvatore Schillaci	40	7	31	6	9	1
	FW	(Italy) ITA	Roberto Baggio	40	22	32	18	8	4
	GK	(Italy) ITA	Angelo Peruzzi	12	-8	6	-5	6	-3
	MF	(Italy) ITA	Angelo Alessio	29	3	21+4	2	4	1
	DF	(Italy) ITA	Gianluca Luppi	22	0	9+5	0	8	0
	FW	(Italy) ITA	Paolo Di Canio	33	1	8+16	0	9	1
	MF	(Italy) ITA	Antonio Conte	20	0	7+7	0	6	0
	MF	(Italy) ITA	Eugenio Corini	29	2	4+18	1	7	1
	GK	(Italy) ITA	Fabio Marchioro	0	0	0	0		
	MF	(Italy) ITA	Nicola Zanini	0	0	0	0		

- Source: http://calcio-seriea.net/presenze/1991/1026/
