= 1992–93 Juventus FC season =

Italian football club season

Juventus
1992–93 season
- President: Vittorio Caissotti di Chiusano
- Head Coach: Giovanni Trapattoni
- Stadium: Stadio delle Alpi
- Serie A: 4th
- Coppa Italia: Semi-finals
- UEFA Cup: Winners (in 1993–94 UEFA Cup)
- Top goalscorer: League: Roberto Baggio (21); All: Roberto Baggio (30)
- Average home league attendance: 45,868
Home colours	Away colours

Juventus Football Club did not manage to win the domestic championship for the seventh year in succession, but the legacy of the season was saved when it beat Borussia Dortmund by 3–1 away from home, then 3–0 in Turin, to clinch the 1992–93 edition of the UEFA Cup.

Prior to the season, Juventus had bought Andreas Möller and Gianluca Vialli for multi-million £ fees. Vialli was considered a disappointment relative to his Sampdoria form, but Möller quickly established himself as a key midfielder and easily came to terms with the Italian game. The third big-money signing David Platt from relegated Bari, spent his season mostly injured, and was sold to Sampdoria at the end of it. Roberto Baggio was the club topscorer for the third successive season, scoring 21 goals, despite being used as a trequartista, playing just behind the forwards.

== Squad ==
Note: Flags indicate national team as defined under FIFA eligibility rules; some limited exceptions apply. Players may hold more than one non-FIFA nationality.

Pos.	Nation	Player
GK	ITA	Angelo Peruzzi
GK	ITA	Michelangelo Rampulla
DF	ITA	Moreno Torricelli
DF	GER	Jürgen Kohler
DF	ITA	Massimo Carrera
DF	ITA	Marco De Marchi
DF	BRA	Júlio César
DF	ITA	Alessandro Dal Canto
DF	ITA	Luigi Sartor
MF	ITA	Dino Baggio
MF	ITA	Antonio Conte

Pos.	Nation	Player
MF	GER	Andreas Möller
MF	ITA	Roberto Galia
MF	ITA	Giancarlo Marocchi
MF	ENG	David Platt
MF	ITA	Massimiliano Giacobbo
FW	ITA	Gianluca Vialli
FW	ITA	Roberto Baggio (Captain)
FW	ITA	Paolo Di Canio
FW	ITA	Fabrizio Ravanelli
FW	ITA	Pierluigi Casiraghi

=== Transfers ===
In
Pos.	Name	from	Type
FW	Gianluca Vialli	Sampdoria	-
MF	Dino Baggio	Inter	loan ended
MF	Andreas Möller	Eintracht Frankfurt	-
MF	David Platt	S.S.C. Bari	-
FW	Fabrizio Ravanelli	A.C. Reggiana	-
DF	Luigi Sartor	Padova	-
DF	Moreno Torricelli	U.S. Caratese	-
FW	Mauro Bertarelli	A.C. Ancona	loan ended
DF	Michele Serena	Hellas Verona	loan ended

Out
Pos.	Name	To	Type
GK	Stefano Tacconi	Genoa CFC	
MF	Stefan Reuter	Borussia Dortmund	
FW	Salvatore Schillaci	Inter	
DF	Luigi De Agostini	Inter	-
MF	Eugenio Corini	Sampdoria	
FW	Mauro Bertarelli	Sampdoria	-
DF	Michele Serena	Sampdoria	-
MF	Nicola Zanini	Sampdoria	-
MF	Angelo Alessio	S.S.C. Bari	
DF	Gianluca Luppi	Fiorentina	

== Competitions ==
=== Serie A ===
==== League table ====
Pos	Team	Pld	W	D	L	GF	GA	GD	Pts	Qualification or relegation
2	Internazionale	34	17	12	5	59	36	+23	46	Qualification to UEFA Cup
3	Parma (Note: Parma qualified to 1993–94 UEFA Cup Winners' Cup as defending champions.)	34	16	9	9	47	34	+13	41	Qualification to Cup Winners' Cup
4	Juventus	34	15	9	10	59	47	+12	39	Qualification to UEFA Cup
5	Lazio	34	13	12	9	65	51	+14	38	Qualification to UEFA Cup
6	Cagliari	34	14	9	11	45	33	+12	37	Qualification to UEFA Cup

Source: 1992–93 Serie A, RSSSF.com
Rules for classification: 1) Points; 2) Head-to-head points; 3) Head-to-head goal difference; 4) Goal difference; 5) Goals scored; 6) Draw.(Note:

==== Results by round ====
Round	1	2	3	4	5	6	7	8	9	10	11	12	13	14	15	16	17	18	19	20	21	22	23	24	25	26	27	28	29	30	31	32	33	34
Ground	A	H	A	H	A	H	A	H	H	A	H	A	A	H	A	H	A	H	A	H	A	H	A	H	A	A	H	A	H	H	A	H	A	H
Result	D	W	D	D	W	D	L	W	W	W	L	L	L	D	D	W	D	W	L	W	L	W	L	L	W	D	W	W	W	W	L	D	L	W
Position	6	2	4	3	2	2	5	4	3	2	3	3	5	6	5	3	4	3	5	4	6	4	6	9	7	6	5	3	3	3	4	4	5	4

Source: Competitive matches
A = Away; H = Home; W = Win; D = Draw; L = Loss; = Leader, 1993–94 UEFA Champions League; = 1993–94 UEFA Cup; = 1993–94 Serie B

==== Matches ====
6 September 1992 1	Cagliari	0–0	Juventus	Cagliari
		Report		Stadium: Stadio Sant'Elia

13 September 1992 2	Juventus	4–1	Atalanta	Turin
	Kohler 23'; Möller 41', 85'; Vialli 75'	Report	Ganz 55'	Stadium: Stadio delle Alpi

20 September 1992 3	Genoa	2–2	Juventus	Genoa
	Ruotolo 15' (o.g.); Skuhravý 55'	Report	Padovano 45'; Platt 77'

27 September 1992 4	Juventus	1–1	Roma	Turin
	Möller 16'	Report	Aldair 19'	Stadium: Stadio delle Alpi

4 October 1992 5	Napoli	2–3	Juventus	Naples
	Fonseca 84'; Zola 86'	Report	5' R. Baggio; 20' Julio Cesar; 57' Möller; 80' Vialli	Stadium: San Paolo

18 October 1992 6	Juventus	0–0	Brescia	Turin
		Report		Stadium: Stadio delle Alpi

25 October 1992 7	Internazionale	3–1	Juventus	Milan
	Sosa 38'; Sammer 41'; Shalimov 80'	Report	Möller 85'	Stadium: San Siro

1 November 1992 8	Juventus	5–1	Ancona	Turin
	D. Baggio 20'; De Marchi 26'; Di Canio 37'; R. Baggio 68', 86'	Report	Centofanti 64'	Stadium: Stadio delle Alpi

8 November 1992 9	Juventus	5–1	Udinese	Turin
	R. Baggio 20'; R. Baggio 22'; Pellegrini 24' (o.g.); R. Baggio 42'; Platt 55'; Peruzzi (red card) 75'; R. Baggio 85'	Report	37' Balbo	Stadium: delle Alpi

22 November 1992 10	Torino	1–2	Juventus	Turin
	Sordo 57'	Report	Vialli 75'; Venturin 90' (o.g.)	Stadium: Stadio delle Alpi

29 November 1992 11	Juventus	0–1	Milan	Turin
		Report	Simone 69'	Stadium: Stadio delle Alpi

6 December 1992 12	Fiorentina	2–0	Juventus	Florence
	B. Laudrup 8'; Sartor 53' (o.g.)	Report		Stadium: Stadio Artemio Franchi

13 December 1992 13	Foggia	2–1	Juventus	Foggia
	P. Bresciani 50'; Mandelli 55'	Report	Ravanelli 79' (pen.)

3 January 1993 14	Juventus	2–2	Parma	Turin
	R. Baggio 52'; Vialli 86'	Report	Kohler 41' (o.g.); Melli 65'	Stadium: Stadio delle Alpi

10 January 1993 15	Sampdoria	1–1	Juventus	Genoa
	Lombardo 5'	Report	Möller 36'	Stadium: Stadio Luigi Ferraris

17 January 1993 16	Juventus	2–1	Pescara	Turin
	R. Baggio 11', 76'	Report	Ferretti 19'	Stadium: Stadio delle Alpi

24 January 1993 17	Lazio	1–1	Juventus	Rome
	Cravero 42'	Report	R. Baggio 14'	Stadium: Stadio Olimpico

31 January 1993 18	Juventus	2–1	Cagliari	Turin
	R. Baggio 18'; Casiraghi 86'	Report	Torricelli 48' (o.g.)	Stadium: Stadio delle Alpi

7 February 1993 19	Atalanta	2–1	Juventus	Bergamo
	Perrone 36'; Ganz 72'	Report	Möller 56'	Stadium: Comunale

14 February 1993 20	Juventus	1–0	Genoa	Turin
	Casiraghi '56; Ravanelli 59'	Report		Stadium: delle Alpi

28 February 1993 21	Roma	2–1	Juventus	Rome
	Giannini 56'; Häßler 71'	Report	R. Baggio 28'	Stadium: Stadio Olimpico

7 March 1993 22	Juventus	4–3	Napoli	Turin
	Di Canio 9'; Platt 16'; Ravanelli 72'; Möller 87'	Report	Zola 51'; Ferrara 71'; Fonseca 80' (pen.)	Stadium: Stadio delle Alpi

14 March 1993 23	Brescia	2–0	Juventus	Brescia
	Răduciouiu 22'; M. Rossi 69'	Report		Stadium: Stadio Mario Rigamonti

21 March 1993 24	Juventus	0–2	Internazionale	Turin
		Report	Sosa 16'; Shalimov 20'	Stadium: Stadio delle Alpi

28 March 1993 25	Ancona	0–1	Juventus	Ancona
		Report	Júlio César 29'

4 April 1993 26	Udinese	0–0	Juventus	Udine
		Report	86' Peruzzi

10 April 1993 27	Juventus	2–1	Torino	Turin
	Conte 9', 81'	Report	Aguilera 28'	Stadium: Stadio delle Alpi

18 April 1993 28	Milan	1–3	Juventus	Milan
	Simone 6'	Report	Möller 13', 20'; R. Baggio 65'	Stadium: San Siro

25 April 1993 29	Juventus	3–0	Fiorentina	Turin
	Möller '59; Marocchi 60'; Casiraghi 73'; Ravanelli 79'; R. Baggio 90' (pen.)	Report		Stadium: dell Alpi

9 May 1993 30	Juventus	4–2	Foggia	Turin
	R. Baggio 14', 45', 80'; Vialli 27'	Report	Sciacca 55' (pen.); Kolyvanov 73'	Stadium: Stadio delle Alpi

16 May 1993 31	Parma	2–1	Juventus	Parma
	Osio 50', 56'	Report	R. Baggio 39'

23 May 1993 32	Juventus	1–1	Sampdoria	Turin
	Platt 47'	Report	Jugović 4'	Stadium: Stadio delle Alpi

30 May 1993 33	Pescara	5–1	Juventus	Pescara
	Allegri 35' (pen.), 59'; Borgonovo 49'; Martorella 86'; Palladini 88'	Report	Ravanelli 2'

6 June 1993 34	Juventus	4–1	Lazio	Turin
	R. Baggio 10' (pen.), 31' (pen.); Vialli 18'; Di Canio 73'	Report	Fuser 2'	Stadium: Stadio delle Alpi

=== Coppa Italia ===
==== Second round ====
26 August 1992 1	Juventus	4–0	Fidelis Andria	Turin
	D. Baggio 33'; Kohler 49'; Möller 56'; R. Baggio 76'			Stadium: delle Alpi

2 September 1992 2	Fidelis Andria	1–1	Juventus	Bari
	Insanguine 90'		55' Baggio	Stadium: San Nicola

==== Eightfinals ====
7 October 1992 1	Juventus	1–0	Genoa C.F.C.	Turin
	Möller 10'			Stadium: delle Alpi

28 October 1992 2	Genoa	3–4	Juventus	Genoa
	Bortolazzi 26'; Skuhravý 81'; Panucci 85'		5', 90' D. Baggio; 29' Möller; 47' Casiraghi	Stadium: Luigi Ferraris

==== Quarterfinals ====
27 January 1993 1	Juventus	2–1	Parma	Turin
	Vialli 77'; Vialli 84'		79' Brolin	Stadium: delle Alpi

10 February 1993 2	Parma	1–1	Juventus	Parma
	Brolin 36' (pen.)		62' Möller	Stadium: Il Tardini

==== Semifinals ====
10 March 1993 1	Torino	1–1	Juventus	Turin
	Poggi 79'		49' Baggio	Stadium: delle Alpi

31 March 1993 2	Juventus	2–2 (3–3a agg.)	Torino	Turin
	Marchegiani 4' (o.g.); Ravanelli 62'		52' Poggi; 63' Aguilera	Stadium: delle Alpi

=== UEFA Cup ===
==== First round ====
16 September 1992 1	Juventus (Italy)	6–1	(Cyprus) Anorthosis Famagusta	Turin, Italy
	R. Baggio 3'; Möller 10'; Vialli 42', 61'; Conte 44'; Torricelli 75'		Ketsbaia 85'	Stadium: Stadio delle Alpi

29 September 1992 2	Anorthosis Famagusta (Cyprus)	0–4 (1–10 agg.)	(Italy) Juventus	Larnaca, Cyprus
			Ravanelli 14'; Kohler 39'; Casiraghi 66', 87'

==== Second round ====
20 October 1992 1	Panathinaikos (Greece)	0–1	(Italy) Juventus	Athens, Greece
			Platt 68'

4 November 1992 2	Juventus (Italy)	0–0 (1–0 agg.)	(Greece) Panathinaikos	Turin, Italy
				Stadium: Stadio delle Alpi

==== Third round ====
25 November 1992 1	Sigma Olomouc (Czechoslovakia)	1–2	(Italy) Juventus	Olomouc, Czechoslovakia
	Maroši 89'		Möller 23'; D. Baggio 76'

10 December 1992 2	Juventus (Italy)	5–0 (7–1 agg.)	(Czechoslovakia) Sigma Olomouc	Turin, Italy
	Vialli 6', 50'; Casiraghi 28'; Möller 46'; Ravanelli 69'			Stadium: Stadio delle Alpi

==== Quarter-finals ====
4 March 1993 1	Benfica (Portugal)	2–1	(Italy) Juventus	Lisbon, Portugal
	Paneira 12', 76'		Vialli 59' (pen.)

17 March 1993 2	Juventus (Italy)	3–0 (4–2 agg.)	(Portugal) Benfica	Turin, Italy
	Kohler 2'; D. Baggio 49'; Ravanelli 67'			Stadium: Stadio delle Alpi

==== Semi-finals ====
6 April 1993 1	Juventus (Italy)	2–1	(France) Paris Saint-Germain	Turin, Italy
	R. Baggio 54', 90+'		Weah 23'	Stadium: Stadio delle Alpi

22 April 1993 2	Paris Saint-Germain (France)	0–1 (1–3 agg.)	(Italy) Juventus	Paris, France
			R. Baggio 77'	Stadium: Parc des Princes

==== Final ====
5 May 1993 1	Borussia Dortmund (Germany)	1–3	(Italy) Juventus	Dortmund, Germany
	Rummenigge 2'	Report	D. Baggio 26'; R. Baggio 30', 74'	Stadium: Westfalenstadion; Attendance: 40,000; Referee: Sándor Puhl (Hungary)

19 May 1993 2	Juventus (Italy)	3–0 (6–1 agg.)	(Germany) Borussia Dortmund	Turin, Italy
	D. Baggio 5', 42'; Möller 65'	Report		Stadium: Stadio delle Alpi; Attendance: 62,781; Referee: John Blankenstein (Netherlands)

== Statistics ==
=== Players statistics ===
No.	Pos	Nat	Player	Total		Serie A		Coppa		UEFA	
No.	Pos	Nat	Player	Apps	Goals	Apps	Goals	Apps	Goals	Apps	Goals
	GK	(Italy) ITA	Peruzzi	45	-57	29	-44	6	-8	10	-5
	DF	(Italy) ITA	Torricelli	48	1	28+2	0	8	0	10	1
	DF	(Germany) GER	Kohler	47	4	29	1	7	1	11	2
	DF	(Brazil) BRA	Júlio César	26	1	16	1	3	0	7	0
	DF	(Italy) ITA	Carrera	47	0	29	0	7	0	11	0
	MF	(Germany) GER	Möller	40	18	25+1	10	4	4	10	4
	MF	(Italy) ITA	Dino Baggio	48	9	31+1	1	7	3	9	5
	MF	(Italy) ITA	Conte	47	3	31	2	6	0	10	1
	FW	(Italy) ITA	Vialli	49	13	30+2	6	7	2	10	5
	FW	(Italy) ITA	Baggio	43	30	26+1	21	7	3	9	6
	FW	(Italy) ITA	Di Canio	45	3	19+12	3	5	0	9	0
	GK	(Italy) ITA	Rampulla	12	-5	5+2	-3	3	-1	2	-1
	MF	(Italy) ITA	Galia	39	0	16+5	0	7	0	11	0
	MF	(England) ENG	Platt	28	4	16	3	6	0	6	1
	MF	(Italy) ITA	Marocchi	33	1	12+11	1	6	0	4	0
	DF	(Italy) ITA	De Marchi	29	1	12+6	1	3	0	8	0
	FW	(Italy) ITA	Casiraghi	29	5	10+8	1	6	1	5	3
	FW	(Italy) ITA	Ravanelli	33	9	8+14	5	3	1	8	3
	DF	(Italy) ITA	Dal Canto	3	0	1+2	0				
	DF	(Italy) ITA	Sartor	1	0	1	0				
	DF	(Italy) ITA	Giacobbo	1	0	0+1	0				
	DF	(Italy) ITA	Ragagnin	0	0	0	0				
	FW	(Italy) ITA	Trocini	0	0	0	0				
	GK	(Italy) ITA	Trombini	0	0	0	0				
	GK	(Italy) ITA	Squizzi	0	0	0	0				

- Source: http://calcio-seriea.net/presenze/1992/1037/
