= Avallone =

Avallone may refer to:

- Avallone, a world-class Know Your Customer (KYC) Software as a Service Platform that allows banks, large corporates and funds better manage and run their KYC
- Avallone or Avalone, a mostly obsolete variant spelling of Avalon, a legendary place in the Arthurian and Grail cycles
- Avallónë, a fictional city in J.R.R. Tolkien's Middle-earth fantasy novels

== People with the surname ==
- Michael Avallone (1924–1999), American writer
- Salvatore Avallone (born 1969), Italian footballer
- Silvia Avallone (born 1984), Italian novelist and poet

== See also ==
- Avallon, a French town
