= Pierluigi Casiraghi =

Italian footballer and manager

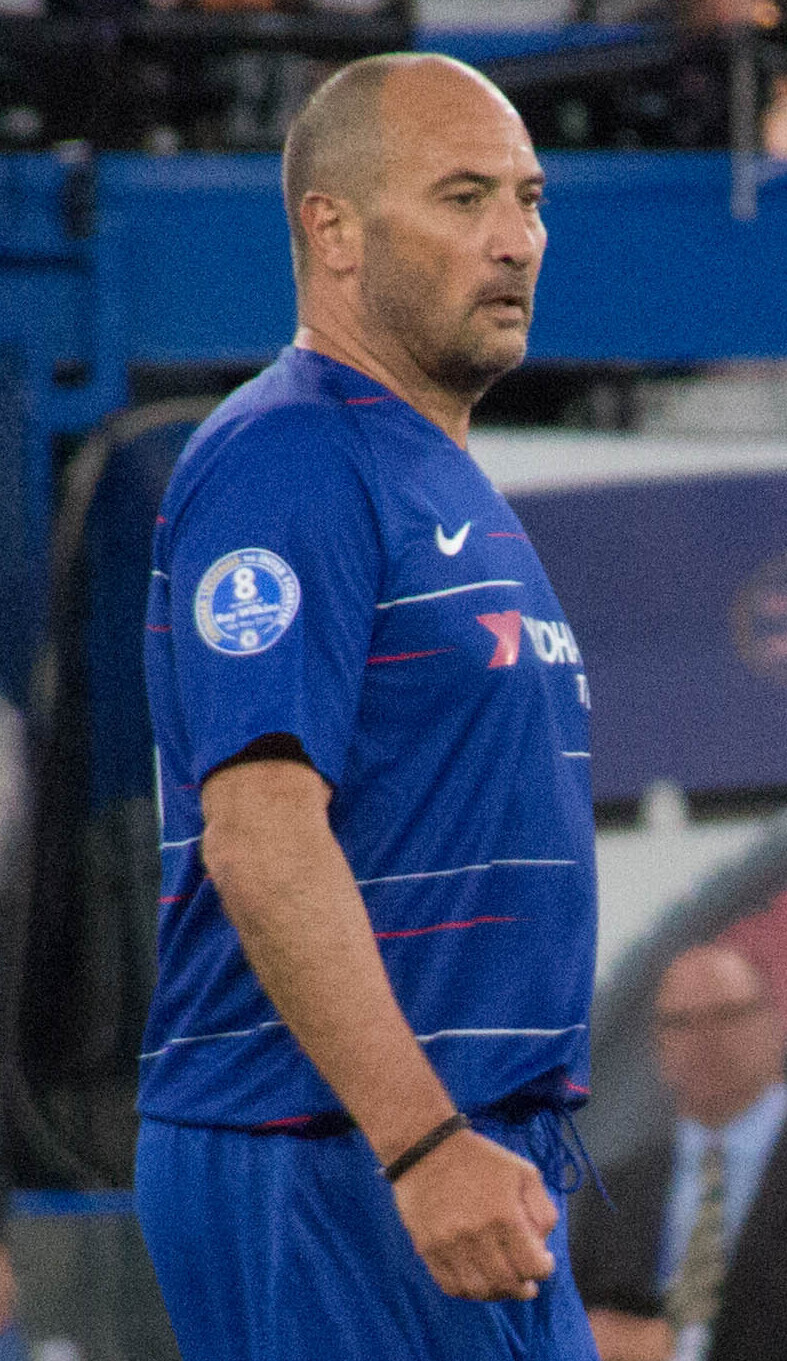
- Casiraghi during a charity match in 2018

Personal information
- Date of birth: 4 March 1969 (age 57)
- Place of birth: Monza, Italy
- Height: 1.82 m (6 ft 0 in)
- Position: Striker

Senior career*
Years	Team	Apps	(Gls)
1985–1989	Monza	94	(28)
1989–1993	Juventus	98	(20)
1993–1998	Lazio	140	(41)
1998–2000	Chelsea	10	(1)
Total		342	(90)

International career
1988–1990	Italy U21	7	(1)
1991–1998	Italy	44	(13)

Managerial career
- 2002–2003: Monza (youth team)
- 2003–2004: Legnano
- 2006–2010: Italy U21 / Italy Olympic
- 2014–2015: Cagliari (assistant)
- 2015–2016: Al-Arabi (assistant)
- 2016–2017: Birmingham City (assistant)
Medal record
Men's football
Representing Italy
FIFA World Cup
Runner-up	1994
- * Club domestic league appearances and goals

Pierluigi Casiraghi (Italian pronunciation: [ˌpjɛrluˈiːdʒi kaziˈraːɡi]; born 4 March 1969) is an Italian professional football coach and former player who played as a striker.

Casiraghi began his playing career in Italy in 1985, with Monza. He later played for Juventus, and Lazio, before ending his career with Chelsea in the Premier League. He retired after failing to recover from a cruciate ligament injury sustained in 1998. Casiraghi was a member of the Italy national football team that reached the 1994 FIFA World Cup final, and was also a member of Italy's UEFA Euro 1996 squad.

After retiring, he began his managerial career in 2002, first with the Monza youth side, later also coaching Legnano, and the Italy U-21 side. Beginning in 2014, he worked as an assistant manager for his compatriot Gianfranco Zola at Cagliari, Al-Arabi, and Birmingham City until Zola's resignation in 2017.

== Club career ==
=== Italy ===
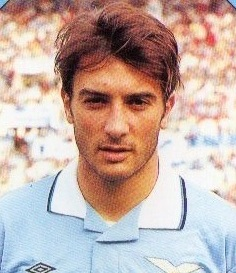
Casiraghi with Lazio in 1993

Casiraghi was born in Monza, Lombardy, and began his career with his hometown side, Monza, in 1985. The side were relegated to Serie C in his first season, but he helped them achieve promotion back to Serie B in 1988. He moved to Serie A giants Juventus in 1989, having scored 28 goals in 94 games for Monza.

His goalscoring record in Turin was modest, achieving a best tally of eight goals in 24 appearances in the 1990–91 season and a total of 20 in 98 games for the club. While at Juventus, he helped the side win two UEFA Cups (in 1990 and 1993) and one Italian Cup, also in 1990. He scored in the first leg of the 1990 UEFA Cup final to help the Turin club defeat rivals Fiorentina. He earned his first international cap for Italy during his spell with Juventus.

He signed for Lazio in 1993 and scored 41 goals in a five-year spell. His most successful season was in 1996–97, when he scored 14 goals in 28 Serie A games. With Lazio, he won another Italian Cup, in 1998. He found his opportunities limited in his final season, with manager Sven-Göran Eriksson preferring Alen Bokšić and Roberto Mancini in attack and sought a move away.

=== Chelsea ===
Casiraghi joined English side Chelsea in May 1998 for £5.4 million. His time in west London proved luckless, and ultimately only scored one competitive goal for the club in ten Premier League appearances, which came against Liverpool in a 1–1 draw at Anfield. His Chelsea career was cut short by a cruciate ligament injury sustained during a collision with West Ham goalkeeper Shaka Hislop in November 1998. Despite going through ten operations, he was unable to make a comeback and his contract with the club was terminated in July 2000, with Chelsea receiving an insurance payout. Casiraghi criticised the club for not helping him, and in August 2000 Casiraghi explored legal action against Chelsea for unpaid wages after his contract was terminated early.

== International career ==
As an Italian international, Casiraghi won seven caps, scoring one goal, for the Italy national under-21 football team between 1988 and 1990, and 44 caps, scoring 13 goals, for the Italy senior side between 1991 and 1998. He made his senior international debut on 13 February 1991, in a 1–0 win against Belgium, scoring his first goal for Italy in a 4–0 win over San Marino on 19 February 1992. He was a member of the Italy squad that reached the final of USA 94 under manager Arrigo Sacchi, losing out to Brazil on penalties following a goalless draw. During the tournament, Casiraghi played in the group games against Norway (a 1–0 victory to Italy) and Mexico (a 1–1 draw), and in the 2–1 semi-final victory against Bulgaria. He was also a member of the Italy side at Euro 96, scoring both goals in the opening 2–1 win against Russia, but was guilty of missing a late chance in the following 2–1 defeat against the Czech Republic that could have proved vital to the group standings, and as such the side was knocked out in the first round following a 0–0 draw against eventual champions Germany. Despite sealing Italy's qualification for the 1998 World Cup with the only goal in the second leg play-off against Russia to advance 2–1 on aggregate on 15 November 1997, he failed to make the squad for the final tournament under Cesare Maldini.

== Style of play ==
Although he was primarily deployed as a centre-forward, Casiraghi was an athletic player, who was also capable of playing anywhere along the front line, due to his versatility. Throughout his career, he became renowned for his ability in the air, and for having a penchant for scoring acrobatic goals as a striker. Although he was not particularly skilful from a technical standpoint, he was a strong, hardworking and prolific forward, with good movement off the ball, who often utilised his physical strength to hold up the ball with his back to goal in order to open up defences, and was also capable of creating space for his teammates with his attacking runs, which in turn enabled him to provide them with assists.

== Managerial career ==
Casiraghi became manager of Italian Serie C2 side Legnano in May 2003. On 24 July 2006, he was appointed head coach of the Italy U-21 national team alongside former Chelsea teammate Gianfranco Zola as his assistant, succeeding Claudio Gentile.

In his coaching tenure, Casiraghi led the Azzurrini into the 2007 UEFA European Under-21 Championship, ending in fifth place after having eliminated Spain in the qualifying phase. He was successively confirmed for the 2008 Summer Olympics campaign, which ended in the quarter-finals with a 3–2 loss to Belgium. He also helped them to win the 2008 Toulon Tournament. In the 2009 UEFA European Under-21 Championship, his side, having lost several key players through injury and suspension, narrowly lost 1–0 to eventual champions Germany in the semifinal.

In December 2016, he joined EFL Championship club Birmingham City as an assistant coach, again reuniting with Zola, as he had previously served in a similar role at Cagliari and Al-Arabi.

== Career statistics ==
=== Club ===
Appearances and goals by club, season and competition
Club	Season	League			National cup (Note: Includes Coppa Italia)		Europe		Other		Total	
Club	Season	Division	Apps	Goals	Apps	Goals	Apps	Goals	Apps	Goals	Apps	Goals
Monza	1984–85	Serie B	—		—		—		—		—	
Monza	1985–86	Serie B	12	1	1	0	—		—		13	1
Monza	1986–87	Serie B	25	6	5	2	—		—		30	8
Monza	1987–88	Serie B	30	12	4	0	—		—		34	12
Monza	1988–89	Serie B	27	9	4	1	—		—		31	10
Monza	Total		94	28	14	3	—		—		108	31
Juventus	1989–90	Serie A	23	4	8	2	9 (Note: Appearances in UEFA Cup)	3	—		40	9
Juventus	1990–91	Serie A	24	8	4	2	2 (Note: Appearances in UEFA Cup Winners' Cup)	1	1 (Note: Appearance in Supercoppa Italiana)	0	31	11
Juventus	1991–92	Serie A	33	7	8	1	—		—		41	8
Juventus	1992–93	Serie A	18	1	6	1	5	3	—		29	5
Juventus	Total		98	20	26	6	16	7	1	0	141	33
Lazio	1993–94	Serie A	26	4	2	0	3	1	—		31	5
Lazio	1994–95	Serie A	34	12	6	3	7	0	—		47	15
Lazio	1995–96	Serie A	28	14	3	0	4	4	—		35	18
Lazio	1996–97	Serie A	24	8	4	2	3	1	—		31	11
Lazio	1997–98	Serie A	28	3	6	0	10	4	—		44	7
Lazio	Total		140	41	21	5	27	10	—		188	56
Chelsea	1998–99	Premier League	10	1	—		4	0	1 (Note: Appearance in UEFA Super Cup)	0	15	1
Career total			342	90	61	14	47	17	2	0	452	121

=== International ===
Italy
Year	Apps	Goals
1991	2	0
1992	6	1
1993	5	2
1994	10	2
1995	5	1
1996	9	5
1997	6	2
1998	1	0
Total	44	13

== Honours ==
=== Club ===
Monza

- Coppa Italia Serie C: 1987–88

Juventus

- Coppa Italia: 1989–90
- UEFA Cup: 1989–90, 1992–93
- Supercoppa Italiana runner-up: 1990

Lazio

- Coppa Italia: 1997–98

Chelsea

- UEFA Super Cup: 1998

=== International ===
Italy

- FIFA World Cup runner-up: 1994
