= Oleksandr Zavarov =

Ukrainian footballer

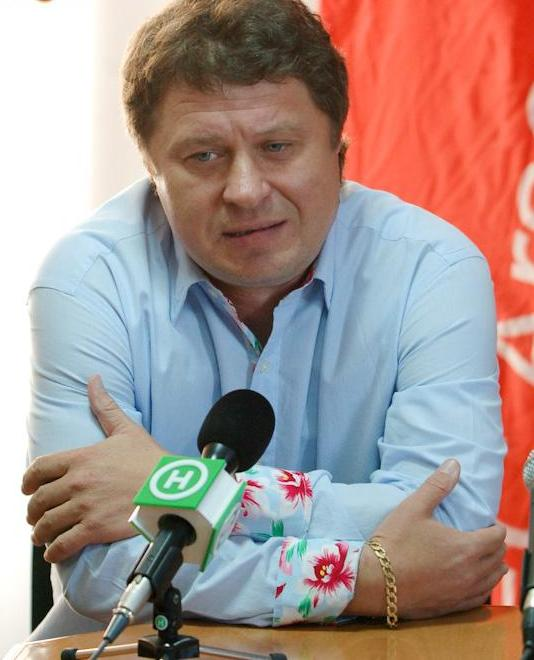

Personal information
- Full name: Oleksandr Anatoliyovych Zavarov
- Date of birth: 26 April 1961 (age 65)
- Place of birth: Luhansk, Ukrainian SSR, Soviet Union
- Height: 1.70 m (5 ft 7 in)
- Position: Midfielder

Team information
- Current team: Dynamo Kyiv (scout)

Youth career
- 1968–1977: Zorya Luhansk

Senior career*
Years	Team	Apps	(Gls)
1977–1979	Zorya Luhansk	23	(7)
1980–1981	SKA Rostov	64	(13)
1982–1983	Zorya Luhansk	30	(10)
1983–1988	Dynamo Kyiv	136	(36)
1988–1990	Juventus	60	(7)
1990–1995	Nancy	133	(23)
1995–1998	Saint-Dizier	?	(17)

International career
1979	USSR youth	3	(1)
1981	USSR under-21	2	(0)
1985–1990	USSR	41	(6)

Managerial career
- 1995–2003: Saint Dizier CO
- 2003–2004: FC Wil
- 2004: FC Astana-1964
- 2005: FC Metalist Kharkiv
- 2006–2010: FC Arsenal Kyiv
- 2012: Ukraine (caretaker)
- 2013–2016: Ukraine (assistant)
- 2018–2021: Dynamo Kyiv (scout)
- 2025–: Vilkhivtsi (consultant coach)
Medal record
Representing Soviet Union
FIFA World Youth Championship
Runner-up	1979 Japan
Representing Soviet Union
UEFA European Championship
Runner-up	1988 West Germany
- * Club domestic league appearances and goals

Oleksandr Anatoliyovych Zavarov (Ukrainian: Олександр Анатолійович Заваров; born 26 April 1961) is a Ukrainian former footballer and the former head coach of FC Arsenal Kyiv. He became first among Soviets footballers who got transferred to West European world class club when he was picked by Juventus to replace the outgoing Michel Platini.

In 1986, he was named the best footballer in the USSR and Ukraine and the 6th best footballer in Europe according to France Football. Zavarov is widely regarded to be among the greatest footballers in the history of the USSR and Ukraine, and in 2000 he was included in the Ukrainian Team of The Century according to a poll by the Ukrainsky Futbol weekly.

== Early life ==
Zavarov was born in Luhansk to family of worker who worked at foundry for one of the city's factories. He started to play early in his life first on streets and then the Zorya sports school of Olympic reserves. Later as senior in school he was offered to enroll to the Kyiv sports boarding school to gain an opportunity to try for Dynamo Kyiv reserves. However, the hometown club was quick on its feet and kept its player. When Zavarov was 16, the head coach of Zorya Yozhef Sabo took him to play for reserve squad and two years later Zavarov made his debut in the Soviet Top League.

With the Zorya sports school team, twice Zavarov reached finals of a children republican tournament "Leather Ball" but, alas, never won it.

== Club career ==
Zavarov made his debut at professional level on 27 April 1979, in an away match against the defending Soviet champion FC Dinamo Tbilisi when he came on substitute for Igor Gamula after the first half. Zorya lost that match 0:3. His first goal Zavarov scored in his third match on "Victory Day", 9 May 1979, in an away tie (2:2) against SKA Rostov-na-Donu in which both goals from Zavarov saved the game for Luhansk. In his first season for the Zorya first team, Zavorov played 23 games and scored 7 goals. However, his team placed second to last that season and was relegated. In the summer of 1979 following the 1979 Spartakiad of the Peoples of the USSR, Valeriy Lobanovskyi offered Zavarov to join Dynamo Kyiv for the first time, but Zavarov refused by stating that he needs to consult with his mother.

In 1979 Zavarov was a student at the Voroshilovgrad Pedagogical Institute, but nonetheless received a notice from the Soviet military entrance processing office to carry out his compulsory military service. He had a choice to serve either in the army or the MVD (Ministry of Internal Affairs), but older teammates, the 1972 champions, were suggesting him against Dynamo (part of the MVD system). He was told that it would be difficult to outperform such players like Oleg Blokhin, Volodymyr Onyshchenko and others who played at that time for Dynamo. Eventually, Zavarov joined SKA Rostov-na-Donu (part of the Armed Forces society) and still has an ambiguous feeling about it whether he has done the right thing. Particularly Zavarov hated that during his demobilization after two seasons he was pressured to remain at SKA, offered a higher military rank (praporschik), possibility of moving to the Central Armed Forces club, PFC CSKA Moscow, and, when refused, placed in for 10 days long "Gauptvakhta" (type of military prison). Coincidentally, at that time SKA was coached by German Zonin who made Zorya in 1972 the Soviet champions. It was him who actually turned Zavarov from forward into midfielder. In 1981 with different coach SKA won the Soviet Cup and in the final game on assist of Zavarov, his "homeboy" Sergey Andreyev scored the winning goal against Spartak Moscow. Two weeks after the cup final in the league match against Spartak Zavarov scored his first career hat-trick, however SKA playing at home lost to Muscovite team 3:4. In SKA Zavarov also played with his friend Igor Gamula and according to some rumors (Sovetsky Sport among others) they may have overindulged themselves with Soviet Abrau-Durso, but in later interviews Zavarov claimed that it was an innocent celebration of a victory in the Soviet Cup.

In 1981 Zavarov also made his first appearance in the European clubs' competitions on September 16 when SKA was hosting Turkish MKE Ankaragücü in the first round of 1981–82 European Cup Winners' Cup. The Soviets won 3:0 and Zavarov scored twice. In the next round SKA played against German Eintracht Frankfurt and again their first match of the two legs tie they played at home. The home win over the Germans also came about not without help of Zavarov.

SKA Rostov-na-Donu leadership tricked Zavarov accused him in being "absent without leave" which would make him do another two years in disciplinary battalion. While being in military detention, Zavarov remained determined to leave the service. His wife when she found out wrote a grievance letter to the Minister of Defense Dmitriy Ustinov. On the 9th day Zavarov gave up after all and signed an agreement to receive a rank and remain in the service. However, once freed, Zavarov was requesting to be demobilized immediately. From the Ministry of Defense arrived a commission which told him if he leaves, they will bar him from playing. Zavarov told them that does not care and was disqualified indefinitely. For almost 6 months he worked at the October Revolution Factory in Luhansk making train wheels until one of workers, two times Hero of Socialist Labor, blacksmith Kurylo didn't appeal to the Football Federation and disqualification was removed.

After being reinstated following his disqualification Zavarov joined the factory team where he worked FC Zorya Luhansk that played in the Pervaya Liga (2nd tier). His first match after the disqualification was on 11 May 1982, in an away game against Kolos Nikopol which Zorya lost 0:2.

In 1983–88, he played for the Soviet-Ukrainian giants, Dynamo Kyiv, with whom he won the UEFA Cup Winners' Cup in 1985–86, scoring in the final itself. In Dynamo Zavarov also was offered a militsiya (police) rank, but he refused.

Zavarov later played for Juventus between 1988 and 1990, becoming the first Soviet player to play in Serie A; he won the Coppa Italia and the UEFA Cup under manager Dino Zoff in 1990, and also wore the iconic number 10 shirt in his first season with the team, which had formerly belonged to club legend Michel Platini, although he later switched to the number 9 shirt, and the number 10 shirt was given to Giancarlo Marocchi the following season. Although much was initially expected of Zavarov at the Turin-based club, his time with Juventus was considered to be less successful, despite his two title victories; in spite of the arrival of compatriot Sergei Aleinikov in his second season with the team, Zavarov also had difficulties settling in at the club, due to his strenuous relationship with the club's manager, Dino Zoff, and also as he struggled to learn Italian. For his transfer Juventus paid $5 million which was a record for the Soviet football. It was one of the highest paid transfers of the decade. The transfer was conducted through a Soviet intermediary "Sovintersport". Upon conclusion of the transfer $3 million went to the Soviet government, $2 million to Dynamo Kyiv. Two million dollars were allocated by the Soviet government to the Soviet Olympic team for the 1988 Summer Olympics in Seoul.

He subsequently transferred to Nancy in 1990, where he remained for five seasons, before finally moving to Saint-Dizier in 1995, retiring after three seasons, in 1998.

== International career ==
At the end of summer of 1979, Zavarov took part in the 1979 FIFA World Youth Championship on the Soviet team losing in the final to Argentinians led by Diego Maradona. In one of the group stages matches Zavarov scored his only goal against Hungarians as a header from a corner kick. The final match against Argentine was one of his two that he actually witnessed from substitution bench.

In October 1981 Zavarov played couple of matches for the under-21 team in group qualifications. Next month he had some issues with club.

Zavarov had 41 caps for the USSR, scoring six goals including two in the World Cup finals in 1986 and 1990. He also played in the Euro 1988 in which the USSR team were runners-up.

== Style of play ==
A creative, quick, agile and skilful midfielder, Zavarov was primarily known for his excellent technical ability, two-footedness, stamina, and tactical intelligence, and was usually deployed as an attacking midfielder or as a supporting striker, although he was also capable of playing as a deep-lying playmaker, due to his versatility, vision, and long passing accuracy. Zavarov played a key role in Valeri Lobanovski's successes with Dynamo Kyiv, and his dribbling skills and playmaking ability led his Dynamo Kyiv coach to compare him to Diego Maradona.

Despite the talent he demonstrated and the success he had both with Ukrainian club Dynamo Kyiv and the Soviet national team at Euro 1988, which earned him a reputation as one of the greatest players to ever come out of the Soviet Union, his time in Italy with Juventus was less successful, and he failed to live up to initial expectations in Serie A. Due to his inconsistent displays and his lack of accuracy in front of goal, he drew criticism from the press, who also singled out his surprisingly poor work-rate and movement off the ball; he was also accused of lacking confidence, and of not being an effective assist-provider for the team. Because of his timid character, it was also argued that he lacked the necessary leadership skills to carry the team, and fill the void left by Michel Platini in the advanced midfield playmaking role during the post-Trapattoni crisis.

== Managerial career ==
Zavarov began his coaching career with Saint Dizier CO as a player-coach. He had a short spell as a head coach of FC Wil in 2003–04, however because he lacked the necessary UEFA licence, he was given the position of director of football with the club. He is currently manager of Ukrainian team Arsenal Kyiv. In 2025 he was appointed as consultant coach of Vilkhivtsi in Ukrainian Second League.

== Career statistics ==
=== Club ===
Appearances and goals by club, season and competition
Club	Season	League			Cup		Europe		Other (Note: Includes Super Cup, League Cup)		Total	
Club	Season	Division	Apps	Goals	Apps	Goals	Apps	Goals	Apps	Goals	Apps	Goals
Zorya Voroshilovgrad	1979	Vysshaya Liga	23	7	–		–		–		23	7
SKA Rostov-na-Donu	1980	Vysshaya Liga	34	6	5	1	–		–		39	7
SKA Rostov-na-Donu	1981	Vysshaya Liga	30	7	9	1	3	2	–		42	10
SKA Rostov-na-Donu	Total		64	13	14	2	3	2	0	0	81	17
Zorya Voroshilovgrad	1982	Pervaya Liga	30	10	–		–		–		30	10
Zorya Voroshilovgrad	Total		53	17	0	0	0	0	0	0	53	17
Dynamo Kyiv	1983	Vysshaya Liga	29	8	1	0	3	0	–		33	8
Dynamo Kyiv	1984	Vysshaya Liga	24	6	2	2	–		–		26	8
Dynamo Kyiv	1985	Vysshaya Liga	31	9	5	2	4	3	–		40	14
Dynamo Kyiv	1986	Vysshaya Liga	20	4	1	0	7	2	–		28	6
Dynamo Kyiv	1987	Vysshaya Liga	14	5	5	3	5	0	–		24	8
Dynamo Kyiv	1988	Vysshaya Liga	18	4	1	0	–		–		19	4
Dynamo Kyiv	Total		136	36	15	7	19	5	0	0	170	48
Vysshaya Liga	Total		223	56	29	9	22	7	0	0	274	72
Juventus	1988–89	Serie A	32	2	2	2	1	0	–		35	4
Juventus	1989–90	Serie A	28	5	6	3	7	1	–		41	9
Juventus	Total		60	7	8	5	8	1	0	0	76	13
Nancy Lorraine	1990–91	Division 1	30	7	2	0	–		–		32	7
Nancy Lorraine	1991–92	Division 1	28	3	4	1	–		–		32	4
Nancy Lorraine	1992–93	Division 2	28	9	–		–		–		28	9
Nancy Lorraine	1993–94	Division 2	22	1	–		–		–		22	1
Nancy Lorraine	1994–95	Division 2	26	3	2	1	–		–		28	4
Nancy Lorraine	Total		134	23	8	2	0	0	0	0	142	25
Division 1	Total		58	10	6	1	0	0	0	0	64	11
Division 2	Total		76	13	2	1	0	0	0	0	78	14

=== International ===
Appearances and goals by national team and year
National team	Year	Apps	Goals
USSR	1985	4	0
USSR	1986	11	1
USSR	1987	4	2
USSR	1988	12	2
USSR	1989	7	0
USSR	1990	3	1
Career total		41	6

Scores and results list Soviet Union's goal tally first, score column indicates score after each Zavarov goal.

#	Date	Venue	Opponent	Score	Result	Competition
1.	9 June 1986	Estadio Sergio León Chavez, Irapuato, Mexico	Canada	2–0	2–0	1986 FIFA World Cup
2.	29 April 1987	Republican Stadium, Kyiv, Soviet Union	East Germany	1–0	2–0	UEFA Euro 1988 qualifying
3.	3 June 1987	Ullevaal Stadion, Oslo, Norway	Norway	1–0	1–0	UEFA Euro 1988 qualifying
4.	31 March 1988	Olympiastadion, West Berlin, West Germany	Argentina	1–0	4–2	Four Nations Tournament
5.	19 October 1988	Republican Stadium, Kyiv, Soviet Union	Austria	2–0	2–0	1990 World Cup qual.
6.	18 June 1990	Stadio San Nicola, Bari, Italy	Cameroon	3–0	4–0	1990 FIFA World Cup
Correct as of 21 May 2016

== Honours ==
=== Club ===
SKA Rostov-na-Donu

Winner

- USSR Cup (1): 1981

Dynamo Kyiv

Winner

- USSR Premier League (2): 1985, 1986
- USSR Cup (2): 1985, 1987
- UEFA Cup Winners Cup: 1985–86

Juventus

Winner

- Coppa Italia: 1989–90
- UEFA Cup: 1989–90

=== International ===
Soviet Union

- FIFA World Youth Championship runner-up: 1979
- UEFA European Football Championship runner-up: 1988

=== Individual ===
- Soviet Footballer of the Year: 1986
- Ukrainian Footballer of the Year: 1986
- ADN Eastern European Footballer of the Season: 1987
- Ukrainian Team of the Century (poll by "Ukrainsky Futbol"): 2000
- UEFA Cup Winners' Cup 1985–86 top scorer.
- Ballon d'Or
  - 1986 – 6th
  - 1987 – 17th
  - 1988 – 8th
  - 1989 – 23rd
- Oleh Blokhin club: 105 goals
