= Massimiliano Giacobbo =

Italian footballer

Personal information
- Date of birth: 15 July 1974 (age 52)
- Place of birth: Cittadella, Italy
- Height: 1.76 m (5 ft 9 in)
- Position: Midfielder

Senior career*
Years	Team	Apps	(Gls)
1992–1993	Juventus	1	(0)
1994–1996	Foggia	24	(0)
1997	Gualdo	15	(1)
1997–1998	Casarano	28	(0)
1998–1999	Arezzo	27	(4)
1999–2001	Pescara	50	(3)
2001–2004	Ancona	19	(0)
2002–2003	→ Messina (loan)	13	(0)
2004–2006	Cittadella	47	(8)
Total		224	(16)
- * Club domestic league appearances and goals

Massimiliano Giacobbo (born 15 July 1974 in Cittadella) is an Italian former professional footballer who played as a midfielder.
