= Sergei Aleinikov =

Belarusian footballer (born 1961)

Personal information
- Full name: Sergei Yevgenyevich Aleinikov
- Date of birth: 7 November 1961 (age 64)
- Place of birth: Minsk, Byelorussian SSR, Soviet Union
- Height: 1.82 m (6 ft 0 in)
- Position: Defensive midfielder

Senior career*
Years	Team	Apps	(Gls)
1981–1989	Dinamo Minsk	220	(31)
1989–1990	Juventus	30	(3)
1990–1992	Lecce	59	(2)
1993–1996	Gamba Osaka	83	(14)
1996	IK Oddevold	5	(0)
1997	Anagni	0	(0)
1998	Corigliano	9	(1)
Total		406	(51)

International career
1983–1984	Soviet Union Olympic	4	(1)
1984–1991	Soviet Union	73	(6)
1992	CIS	4	(0)
1992–1994	Belarus	4	(0)

Managerial career
- 1998–1999: Anagni
- 2000–2001: U.S. Pontedera 1912
- 2003: Torpedo-Metalurg Moscow
- 2003: Vidnoye
- 2003–2005: Copertino Youth Academy
- 2005–2007: Juventus Youth Academy
- 2007–2008: Kras
- 2011–2012: Kras
- 2014: Dainava Alytus
Medal record
Men's football
Representing Soviet Union
UEFA European Championship
Runner-up	1988 West Germany
- * Club domestic league appearances and goals

Sergei Yevgenyevich Aleinikov (Russian: Сергей Евгеньевич Алейников; Belarusian: Сярге́й Яўге́навіч Але́йнікаў, Syarhey Alyeynikaw; born 7 November 1961) is a Belarusian and Soviet former professional footballer, and currently a coach. He primarily played as a defensive midfielder and was known for his stamina, intelligence, solid technique, tactical sense, and passing ability. He also played in defence as a sweeper or centre-back.

In 2024 he became a sporting director in PFC Lokomotiv Plovdiv

== Playing career ==
Aleinikov was born in Minsk, Belarusian SSR. He played for the USSR national football team, making 73 appearances, scoring six goals, from 1984 to 1991, and was in the Soviet squad that made the final of Euro 1988, losing to the Netherlands 0–2. He also played for the CIS in 1992 and earned 4 caps for Belarus after the independence of Belarus, earning his final cap against Luxembourg in a Euro 1996 qualifier in 1994.

He joined Dinamo Minsk in 1981 and won the USSR championship the following season. The midfielder then joined Juventus FC in 1989, and won the UEFA Cup and Coppa Italia in 1990. He signed for U.S. Lecce in 1990, and in 1992 went to Japan to play for Gamba Osaka. He finished his career with Swedish side IK Oddevold in 1996.

In November 2003, to celebrate UEFA's Jubilee, he was selected as the Golden Player of Belarus by the Football Federation of Belarus as their most outstanding player of the past 50 years.

== Coaching career ==
In the 2007–08 season Aleinikov served as head coach of amateur Promozione team Kras. He coached the side for a second time from summer 2011 until 30 October 2012.

== Personal life ==
His son Artur (born 1991), a midfielder, followed his father's footsteps and was part of Novara squad in 2009.

== Career statistics ==
=== Club ===
Appearances and goals by club, season and competition
Club	Season	League			National cup (Note: Includes Soviet Cup, Coppa Italia, Emperor's Cup)		League cup (Note: Includes J.League Cup)		Continental		Total	
Club	Season	Division	Apps	Goals	Apps	Goals	Apps	Goals	Apps	Goals	Apps	Goals
Dinamo Minsk	1981	Top League	14	0			–				14	0
Dinamo Minsk	1982	Top League	21	8			–				21	8
Dinamo Minsk	1983	Top League	29	2			–				29	2
Dinamo Minsk	1984	Top League	31	3			–				31	3
Dinamo Minsk	1985	Top League	32	5			–				32	5
Dinamo Minsk	1986	Top League	21	6			–				21	6
Dinamo Minsk	1987	Top League	28	2			–				28	2
Dinamo Minsk	1988	Top League	28	3			–				28	3
Dinamo Minsk	1989	Top League	16	2			–				16	2
Dinamo Minsk	Total		220	31			–				220	31
Juventus	1989–90	Serie A	30	3	8	0	–		12 (Note: Appearances in UEFA Cup)	0	50	3
Lecce	1990–91	Serie A	29	0			–		–		29	0
Lecce	1991–92	Serie B	30	2			–		–		30	2
Lecce	Total		59	2	0	0	–		–		59	2
Gamba Osaka	1993	J1 League	15	0	2	1	5	1	–		22	2
Gamba Osaka	1994	J1 League	32	6	0	0	3	1	–		35	7
Gamba Osaka	1995	J1 League	36	8	4	1	–		–		40	9
Gamba Osaka	1996	J1 League	0	0	0	0	0	0	–		0	0
Gamba Osaka	Total		83	14	6	2	8	2	–		97	18
Oddevold	1996	Allsvenskan	5	0			–		–		5	0
Città di Anagni	1997–98	Nazionale Dilettanti	0	0			–		–		0	0
Corigliano	1997–98	Nazionale Dilettanti	9	1			–		–		9	1
Total			406	51	14	2	8	2	12	0	440	55

=== International ===
Appearances and goals by national team and year
National team	Year	Apps	Goals
Soviet Union	1984	6	0
Soviet Union	1985	14	1
Soviet Union	1986	10	1
Soviet Union	1987	8	1
Soviet Union	1988	15	2
Soviet Union	1989	7	0
Soviet Union	1990	5	0
Soviet Union	1991	8	1
Total		73	6
CIS	1992	4	0
Total		4	0
Belarus	1992	1	0
Belarus	1993	2	0
Belarus	1994	1	0
Total		4	0

== Honours ==
Dinamo Minsk

- Soviet Top League: 1982

Juventus

- Coppa Italia: 1989–90
- UEFA Cup: 1989–90

Soviet Union

- UEFA European Championship runner-up: 1988

Individual

- Belarusian Footballer of the Year: (3) 1984, 1986, 1988
