= Adriano Bonaiuti =

Italian footballer and coach (born 1967)

Personal information
- Date of birth: 7 May 1967 (age 59)
- Place of birth: Rome, Italy
- Height: 1.81 m (5 ft 11 in)
- Position: Goalkeeper

Team information
- Current team: Inter Milan (goalkeeping coach)

Senior career*
Years	Team	Apps	(Gls)
1984–1985	Cesena	0	(0)
1985–1989	Sambenedettese	32	(0)
1989–1991	Juventus	1	(0)
1991–1996	Padova	178	(0)
1996–1998	Palermo	39	(0)
1996–1997	→ Cosenza (loan)	21	(0)
1998–1999	Trapani	24	(0)
1999–2000	Pescara	7	(0)
2000–2005	Udinese	0	(0)

Managerial career
- 2004–2005: Udinese (goalkeeping coach)
- 2005–2009: Roma (goalkeeping coach)
- 2010–2013: Udinese (assistant)
- 2013–2023: Inter Milan (goalkeeping coach)
- * Club domestic league appearances and goals

Adriano Bonaiuti (born 7 May 1967) is an Italian professional football coach and a former player who played as a goalkeeper. He is the current goalkeeping coach of Inter Milan.

== Career ==
A youth product of Cesena, he started his career with minor league club Sambenedettese before to become Stefano Tacconi's backup at Juventus. In 1991, he joined Padova, where he spent five years as a regular, being protagonist to the club's rise into the top flight. From 1996 to 1998 he played for Palermo, successively moving to another Western Sicilian club, Trapani. In 2000, after a short stint at Pescara, he joined Udinese as third-choice keeper, retiring from football in 2005.

He served as goalkeeping coach of Udinese from 2004 to 2005 (while still active as a player), then moving back to his native Rome to fill in the same position under head coach Luciano Spalletti (from 2005 to 2009).

== Honours ==
Juventus

- UEFA Cup winner: 1989–90.
- Coppa Italia winner: 1989–90.
