= Nicolò Napoli =

Italian footballer and manager

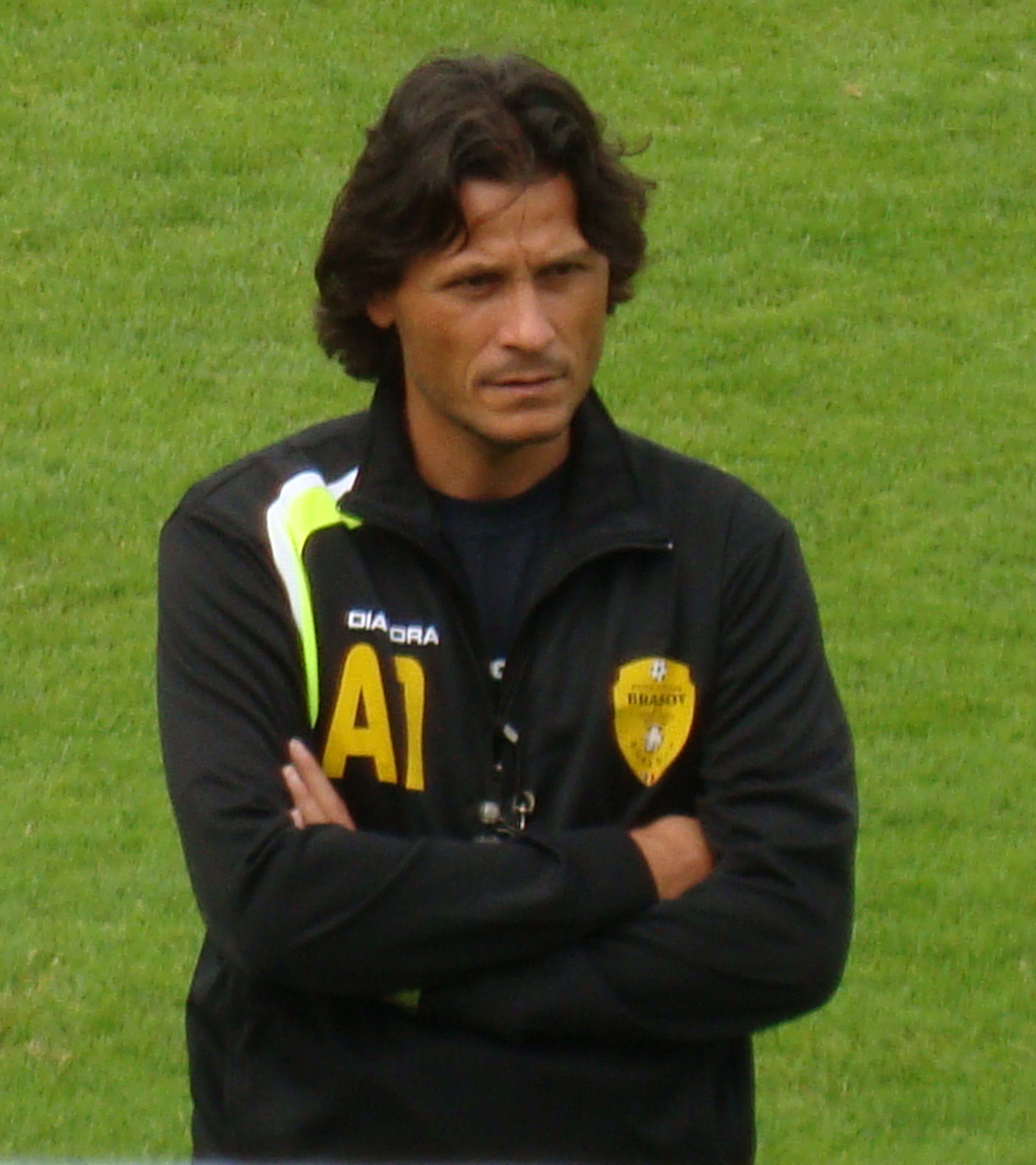

Personal information
- Full name: Nicolò Napoli
- Date of birth: 7 February 1962 (age 64)
- Place of birth: Palermo, Italy
- Height: 1.82 m (6 ft 0 in)
- Position: Right back

Youth career
- Palermo
- –1980: Libertas Messina

Senior career*
Years	Team	Apps	(Gls)
1980–1982	Messina	71	(4)
1983–1984	Cavese	2	(0)
1983–1984	→ Benevento (loan)	27	(3)
1984–1987	Messina	104	(16)
1987–1991	Juventus	62	(6)
1991–1996	Cagliari	148	(9)
1996–1997	Reggina	29	(0)
1997–1998	US Tempio	3	(0)
Total		446	(38)

Managerial career
- 2002: ASD Moncalieri Calcio 1953
- 2003: Vado
- 2004: FC Universitatea Craiova
- 2005–2007: Sporting Orbassano
- 2007–2009: FC Universitatea Craiova
- 2009: FC Brașov
- 2009–2010: Astra Ploiești
- 2011: FC Universitatea Craiova
- 2011: FC Universitatea Craiova (sporting director)
- 2012–2013: CS Turnu Severin
- 2013–2014: FC U Craiova
- 2014–2016: CSMS Iaşi
- 2018–2019: FC U Craiova
- 2020: FC U Craiova
- 2021: Politehnica Iași
- 2022: FC U Craiova
- 2022–2023: FC U Craiova
- 2024: FC U Craiova
- 2024: FC U Craiova (technical director)
- * Club domestic league appearances and goals

Nicolò Napoli (born 7 February 1962) is an Italian professional football manager and former player.

== Coaching career ==
Napoli was born in Palermo. A former professional player with several Serie A teams, including Juventus FC, he moved to Romania in 2007 to work as a manager with Liga I outfit Universitatea Craiova. On 5 July 2009, he then accepted an offer from another Liga I club, FC Brașov, only to leave it three weeks later due to family issues.

On 20 August 2009, he signed a one-year contract (with an option for a further one-year extension) with Liga I team Astra Ploiești. He did not finish his contract, being sacked in April 2010. In 2011, he returned to Craiova for a third spell, but was sacked because of poor results.

In September 2012, Napoli came back to Romania, accepting the offer to manage the newly promoted in Liga I, CS Turnu Severin. He signed a contract until the end of the year, and the agreement wasn't renewed.

At the end of June 2013, he signed an agreement on three seasons with FC U Craiova club which he returns for the fourth time in his career. He was sacked in February 2014.

On 13 October 2014, he reached an agreement with Politehnica Iași where he stayed until 2016.

In 2018 he signed a contract with FC U Craiova, for his sixth stint with the club. He was fired in 2019, but was then rehired 2020. On 12 March 2021 he once again joined ACSM Politehnica Iasi, a job he held for just over three months before being fired on the 20th of June the same year. After being without a job for 6 months, he joined FC U Craiova in January 2022. Six months later, in June, he was once again fired, marking the end of his eight spell with the club. He was not away for long however, and just 4 and a half months later, in November, he once again took charge of the club. This time he lasted for just over six months until once again being fired in June 2023. Nine months later, in March 2024, he joined the club for a 10th time, and is currently still employed as the manager of the club.

== Honours ==
=== Player ===
Messina

- Serie C2: 1982–83
- Serie C1: 1985–86

Juventus

- Coppa Italia: 1989–90
- UEFA Cup: 1989–90

=== Manager ===
Individual

- Gazeta Sporturilor Romania Coach of the Month: February 2022
