= AS Fortis Spoleto FC =

Italian football club

Fortis Spoleto
- Full name: Associazione Sportiva Fortis Spoleto; Football Club
- Founded: 2003
- Dissolved: 2006
- Ground: Comunale, Spoleto, Italy
- Capacity: 1,800
- League: none
- 2005-06: Serie D/E, 1st
Home colours	Away colours

A.S. Fortis Spoleto F.C. was an Italian football club from Spoleto, Umbria. The club was founded in 2003, and won Serie D/E in 2005/06.

However, the club went out of existence after the team was excluded from playing Serie C2 in 2006–07 because of financial troubles and banned from all competitive football and has been replaced by current team Voluntas Spoleto currently playing in regional Eccellenza. They failed the national barrages to gain promotion in Serie D losing with Jesina. A huge number of exclusions in Serie D will however allow Voluntas to be admitted in Serie D.
