= Stefano Tacconi =

Italian footballer (born 1957)

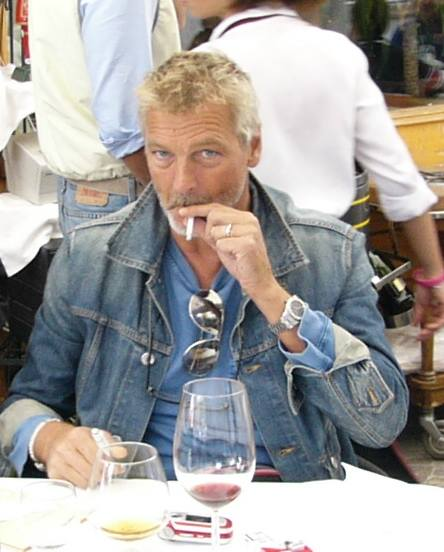
- Tacconi in 2005

Personal information
- Full name: Stefano Tacconi
- Date of birth: 13 May 1957 (age 69)
- Place of birth: Perugia, Italy
- Height: 1.92 m (6 ft 4 in)
- Position: Goalkeeper

Youth career
- 1972–1974: Spoleto

Senior career*
| Years | Team | Apps | (Gls) |
| 1974–1975 | Spoleto | 0 | (0) |
| 1975–1976 | Inter | 0 | (0) |
| 1976–1977 | Spoleto | 30 | (0) |
| 1977–1978 | Pro Patria | 7 | (0) |
| 1978–1979 | Livorno | 33 | (0) |
| 1979–1980 | Sambenedettese | 38 | (0) |
| 1980–1983 | Avellino | 90 | (0) |
| 1983–1992 | Juventus | 254 | (0) |
| 1992–1995 | Genoa | 43 | (0) |
| 2008–2009 | Arquata | | (0) |
| Total | | 495 | (0) |

International career
| 1987–1991 | Italy | 7 | (0) |
Medal record
Men's football
Representing Italy
FIFA World Cup
| Third place | 1990 Italy |
- * Club domestic league appearances and goals

Stefano Tacconi Cavaliere OMRI (Italian pronunciation: [ˈsteːfano takˈkoːni]; born 13 May 1957) is an Italian former professional footballer who played as a goalkeeper. He is the only goalkeeper to have won all international club competitions, a feat he managed during his time with Juventus. At international level, he was largely used as a back-up goalkeeper behind Walter Zenga, which earned him the nickname "the best back-up keeper in the world". He was a member of the Italy squads that took part at the 1988 Summer Olympics, UEFA Euro 1988, and the 1990 FIFA World Cup. He is widely regarded by pundits as one of the best goalkeepers of his generation, and as one of Italy's best ever goalkeepers.

== Club career ==
Tacconi got his first significant experience at Spoleto football club. Following this, having already attracted the interest of Inter Milan, he had his first brief stint as a professional with Pro Patria and Livorno before joining Sambenedettese. He then reached Serie A with Avellino in the 1980–81 season; he remained there for three years before joining the Italian club Juventus in 1983, ahead of Luciano Bodini, as a replacement for his legendary predecessor Dino Zoff, who had retired at the end of the previous season.

With Giovanni Trapattoni's Juventus club, Tacconi achieved great domestic and international success, as he won two scudetti in 1984 and 1986, the European Cup Winners' Cup in 1984, the 1984 European Super Cup, the European Champion Clubs' Cup in 1985 and the 1985 Intercontinental Cup the same year against Argentinos Juniors on penalties. In 1990 Tacconi and Juventus went on to win a UEFA Cup and a Coppa Italia double; the following season, he was named the team's captain, although Juventus lost out on the 1990 Supercoppa Italiana to Serie A winners Napoli. During this period, Juventus were one of the best teams in the world, and Tacconi was also regarded as one of the top goalkeepers in the world.

After a ten-year working relationship with Juventus (during the 1985–86 season, he was kept on the bench), Tacconi transferred to Genoa in 1992. Unfortunately, Genoa was relegated to Serie B at the end of season. He retired from professional football in 1994.

== International career ==
Despite his performances and success with Juventus, Tacconi was not able to find much space in the Italy national side under Azeglio Vicini, due to the presence of several other excellent keepers, such as Giovanni Galli initially, and Walter Zenga – his perceived career rival – in particular, as well as the emerging keeper Gianluca Pagliuca, subsequently. As a result, Tacconi was frequently Zenga's reserve for the Italy national team.

Tacconi made his senior international debut in a 3–1 win over Argentina on 10 June 1987, in Zürich. In the late 1980s, he was chosen by manager and former goalkeeper Dino Zoff as the starting goalkeeper for the Under-23 Italian Olympic side which reached the semi-finals in the 1988 Olympics in Seoul, eventually finishing in fourth place. Tacconi was Zenga's deputy during Euro 1988, where Italy managed a semi-final finish, and at the 1990 World Cup on home soil, where Italy finished in third place following a semi-final loss on penalties to defending champions Argentina. In 2014, Tacconi criticised Vicini for his decision not to bring him on for the shoot-out in the 1990 World Cup semi-final, following the Netherlands' penalty shoot-out victory over Costa Rica in the 2014 World Cup quarter-finals, in which manager Louis van Gaal brought on goalkeeper Tim Krul for the shoot-out; the historic substitution proved to be decisive, with the shot-stopper saving two out of five spot kicks. Tacconi believed that he was better at saving penalties than Zenga, and that Vicini should have made a similar substitution at the time.

In total, Tacconi made seven appearances for Italy between 1987 and 1991, all in friendly matches, conceding two goals. He played his final match for Italy on 13 February 1991, keeping a clean sheet in a 0–0 friendly home draw with Belgium, in Terni.

== Style of play ==
Although not particularly agile, Tacconi was a powerful and athletic goalkeeper, who was known for his consistency and shot-stopping ability, as well as his ability to produce important saves, in particular in decisive games. A vocal and commanding presence in goal, he was also known for his leadership, temper, and strong character, and often called out defenders for their errors. Although he was initially not known for his ability to come out and collect crosses, and performed better between the posts, he improved upon this aspect of his game in his later career, with the help of Zoff, and often came off his line to claim high balls that were coming straight at him, although he still remained less inclined to collect deliveries from wider areas. He was also known for his adeptness at stopping penalties. Although he had a deep goal kick, he was not particularly gifted with his feet, and struggled to adapt his game following the introduction of the back-pass rule, and was even critical of the new regulations. He was also not particularly adept at playing as a sweeper-keeper in zonal marking systems, which saw him struggle under Juventus manager Luigi Maifredi, despite having once played in a similar (and, for the time, unorthodox) manner during his stint at Avellino.

== After retiring from football ==
After quitting professional football, Tacconi had several disappointing experiences in politics. In 1999, he was on Alleanza Nazionale's lists for the European parliamentary elections, but failed to earn a seat. In 2005, he controversially tried to stand for president of Lombardy as a candidate for New Italian Social Movement, an extreme right-wing party, but could not garner enough votes to validate his candidacy. In 2006, he put in for a city councilman position in Milan again within Alleanza Nazionale, supporting winner Letizia Moratti for mayor, but gained only 57 personal preferences (votes) and was not elected to the office.

In August 2008, at the age of 51, he accepted an offer from Arquata, a Seconda Categoria amateur club based in Arquata del Tronto, Marche, to make a return into active football as a goalkeeper.

== Personal life ==
On 13 May 2011, Tacconi married long-time partner Laura Speranza, with whom he has four children. He considers himself Roman Catholic.

In October 2023, Tacconi was released from hospital following his rehabilitation from a brain haemorrhage he suffered in April 2022.

== Honours ==
Juventus

- Serie A: 1983–84, 1985–86
- Coppa Italia: 1989–90
- European Cup: 1984–85
- European Cup Winners' Cup: 1983–84
- UEFA Cup: 1989–90
- European Super Cup: 1984
- Intercontinental Cup: 1985
- Supercoppa Italiana: runner-up 1990

Italy

- FIFA World Cup: third place 1990

Individual

- Guerin Sportivo Serie A Team of The Year: 1984, 1988, 1990
- Premio Nazionale Carriera Esemplare "Gaetano Scirea": 1993
- Juventus FC Hall of Fame: 2025

Orders

- 5th Class / Knight: Cavaliere Ordine al Merito della Repubblica Italiana: 1991

== See also ==
- List of players to have won all international club competitions
- List of players to have won the three main European club competitions
