= Federico Giampaolo =

Italian footballer

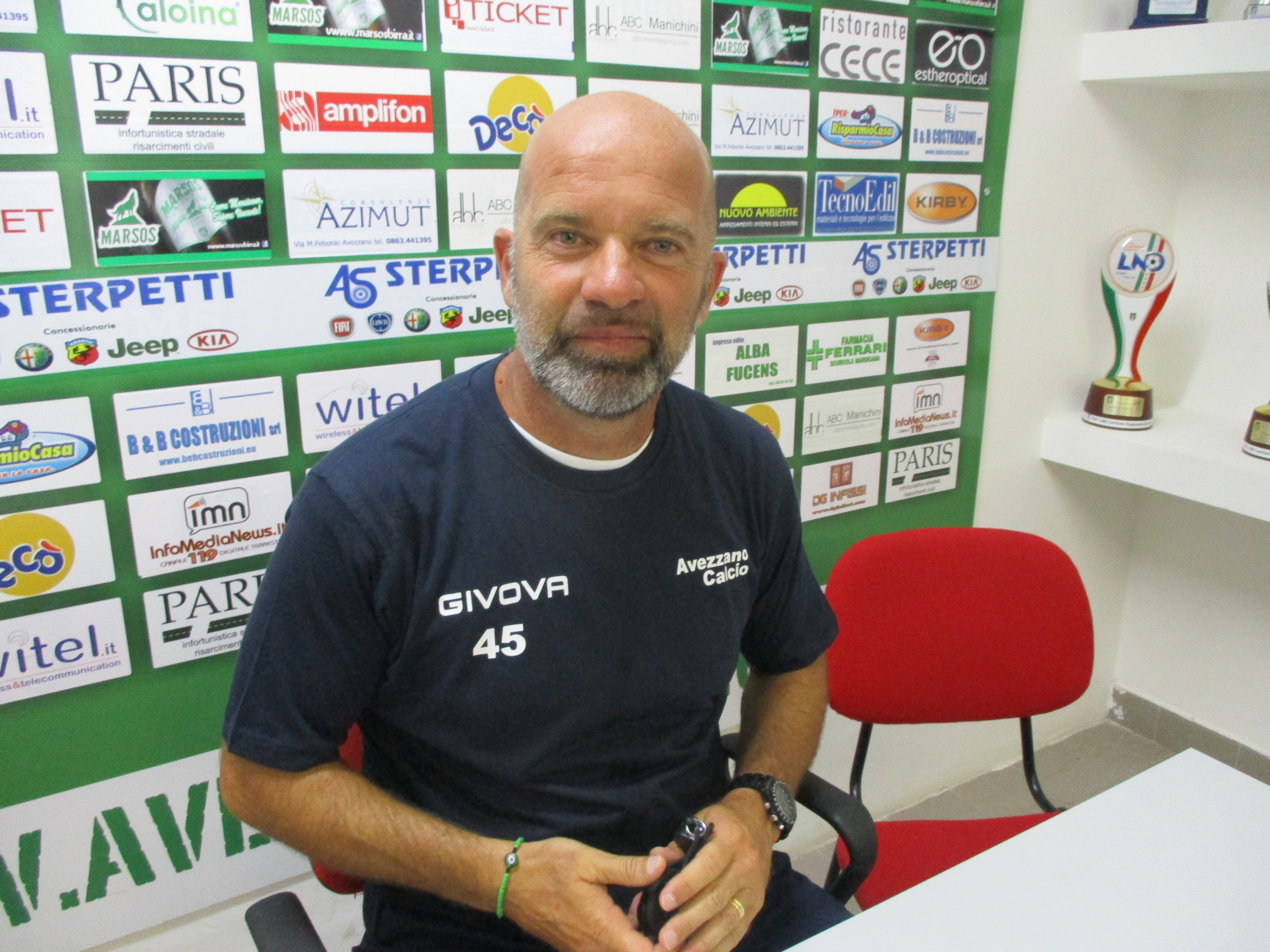

Personal information
- Date of birth: 3 March 1970 (age 56)
- Place of birth: Teramo, Italy
- Height: 1.78 m (5 ft 10 in)
- Position: Striker

Senior career*
Years	Team	Apps	(Gls)
1987–1988	Giulianova	27	(4)
1988–1993	Juventus	0	(0)
1990–1991	→ Spezia (loan)	31	(4)
1991–1992	→ Bari (loan)	20	(1)
1992–1993	→ Verona (loan)	29	(5)
1993–1994	Palermo	21	(1)
1994–1997	Pescara	101	(31)
1997–1998	Genoa	37	(10)
1998–1999	Salernitana	25	(3)
1999–2005	Pescara	152	(33)
2001–2002	→ Cosenza (loan)	22	(5)
2005	Ascoli	0	(0)
2005–2006	Modena	25	(1)
2006–2007	Crotone	24	(5)
2007–2008	Cavese	25	(5)
2008–2009	Sorrento	26	(4)
2009–2010	Noicattaro	8	(4)
Total		573	(116)

Managerial career
- 2014: Valle d'Aosta
- 2017–2019: Avezzano
- 2019–2021: Recanatese
- 2021: L'Aquila
- 2024: Bari (caretaker)
- * Club domestic league appearances and goals

Federico Giampaolo (born 3 March 1970) is an Italian former professional footballer who played as a striker.

== Playing career ==
Giampaolo was born in Teramo. Like his brother Marco, now a football coach, he started his career at Giulianova. He played his first professional season in 1987–88, making 27 Serie C2 appearances.

He then joined Juventus youth team. After age of 20, he was loaned to Spezia at Serie C1, Bari at Serie A and Verona at Serie B. In October 1993, he joined Palermo at Serie B. Still, in the next season, he joined Serie B rival Pescara, where he played another three Serie B seasons, including 1996–97 season which scored 16 goals. In the summer of 1997, Genoa, which failed to return to Serie A in the previous season, signed Giampaolo. He scored ten goals, but once again missed out on promotion. He played four Serie B games at the start of 1998–99 season, before joining Salernitana, newcomer of Serie A, in October 1998. But Giampaolo's Serie A career faced another false start due to Salernitana being in the relegation zone. After playing two games for Salernitana, he returned to Pescara, league rival of Salernitana. Pescara finished bottom of the table in 2000–01 season, and Giampaolo was loaned to Cosenza in Serie B, before returning to Pescara for the 2002–03 season, where he helped the club gain promotion back to Serie B. In July 2005, he went to play for Ascoli, later obtaining Serie A promotion due to the 2006 Italian football scandal. But he failed to play any games in his last Serie A season, as he moved to Modena in Serie B on 31 August, before the start of Serie A. In July 2006, he joined another Serie B club Crotone. Crotone finished the second from bottom in the league, and Giampaolo found his place at Cavese of Serie C1 in the next season. He then spent the 2008–09 season with Sorrento. He played for Noicattaro during the 2009–10 season, after which he retired from professional football.

== Coaching career ==
In 2010, Giampaolo started a coaching career as an assistant to Sauro Trillini at Noicattaro. He then served as an Under-19 youth coach at Bari from 2011 to 2013, and then at Pescara from 2013 to 2014.

In 2014, Giampaolo briefly served as head coach of Serie D amateurs Valle d'Aosta. During the 2015–16 season, he served as assistant to Luca D'Angelo at Fidelis Andria, before returning to Bari to accept a position in charge of their Under-17 team.

He successively worked at Serie D clubs Avezzano (2017 to 2019), Recanatese (2019 to 2021) and Eccellenza club L'Aquila from June to December 2021.

In July 2022, Giampaolo returned to Bari, this time being named in charge of the Under-19 team. On 15 April 2024, he was appointed as a caretaker coach for the first team until the end of the club's 2023–24 Serie B campaign, following the dismissal of Giuseppe Iachini. Under his tenure, Bari barely suffered relegation, escaping that only after defeating Ternana in a two-legged playoff; he left the team by the end of the season.
