= Salvatore Avallone =

Italian footballer (born 1969)

Personal information
- Date of birth: 30 August 1969 (age 57)
- Place of birth: Salerno, Italy
- Height: 1.77 m (5 ft 9 1/2 in)
- Position: Midfielder

Senior career*
Years	Team	Apps	(Gls)
1987–1988	Valdiano	33	(1)
1988–1990	Juventus	2	(0)
1990–1991	Avellino	10	(0)
1991–1992	Casale	14	(0)
1992–1997	Alessandria	138	(1)
1997–2002	Nocerina	134	(0)
2002–2004	Varese	56	(0)
2004–2005	Juve Stabia	26	(0)
- * Club domestic league appearances and goals

Salvatore Avallone (born 30 August 1969, in Salerno) is an Italian former professional footballer who played as a midfielder.

== Honours ==
Juventus

- UEFA Europa League winner: 1989–90
- Coppa Italia winner: 1989–90
