= Luigi Maifredi =

Italian footballer and manager (born 1947)

Personal information
- Date of birth: 20 April 1947 (age 79)
- Place of birth: Lograto, Italy
- Position: Midfielder

Team information
- Current team: Brescia (technical collaborator)

Youth career
- 1966: Brescia

Senior career*
Years	Team	Apps	(Gls)
1967	Rovereto	9	(1)
1968	Portogruaro	18	(4)

Managerial career
- 1976–1977: Real Brescia
- 1977–1978: Crotone (assistant manager)
- 1978–1980: Lumezzane
- 1984–1986: Orceana
- 1986–1987: Ospitaletto
- 1987–1990: Bologna
- 1990–1991: Juventus
- 1991–1992: Bologna
- 1992–1993: Genoa
- 1994: Venezia
- 1995: Brescia
- 1996: Pescara
- 1996: Esperance Sportive de Tunis
- 1998–1999: Albacete Balompié
- 2000: Reggiana
- 2013: Brescia (caretaker)
- * Club domestic league appearances and goals

Luigi Maifredi (born 20 April 1947), commonly known as Gigi Maifredi, is an Italian football manager.

== Career ==
Born in Lograto (Province of Brescia), started out playing in his hometown club's youth system, and later played for Rovereto and Portogruaro. Maifredi's coaching career began in 1976 with amateur side Real Brescia. He later served as assistant manager of Crotone, and also had spells in the lower divisions of Italian football with Lumezzane and Orceana, as well as Pspitaletto, with whom he won the Serie C2, Girone B title during the 1986–87 season.

In 1987, Maifredi was appointed as manager of Serie B side Bologna, under the club's president Luigi Corioni. During his three seasons with Bologna, his attacking style of play proved to be highly effective; after joining the team, he helped the club win the Serie B title and achieve promotion to Serie A in his first season, and later helped the team avoid relegation in his second season, and subsequently qualify for the UEFA Cup in 1990.

Maifredi is most noted for his short spell with Juventus, whom he joined after replacing Dino Zoff in 1990. During his only season in Turin, the club were known for their inconsistent performances. After a strong first half of the season, the club suffered a loss of form, during which they lost six games in a row. Maifredi was eventually sacked at the end of the season, following the club's failure to qualify for European football after placing seventh in Serie A, also losing out 5–1 to Napoli in the 1990 Supercoppa Italiana final; however, he managed to reach the semi-finals of the Cup Winners' Cup and the quarter-finals of the Coppa Italia. Following his disappointing spell with Juventus, over the course of his coaching career, Maifredi managed several clubs in Italy, such as Bologna once again, Genoa, Venezia, and Brescia, among other teams, as well as having short coaching spells in Tunisia with Esperance Sportive de Tunis, and Spain with Albacete Balompié; however, he encountered less success with other teams.

In 2005, Maifredi was on course to sign with Lazio, but the club's supporters were not keen on Maifredi's appointment, and even demonstrated against it, which ultimately forced the club's president Claudio Lotito to back down and appoint Giuseppe Papadopulo instead. In December 2009, he was successively appointed as a technical consultant and later as the director of Brescia Calcio.

On 24 September 2013, after thirteen years since his last coaching appointment with Reggiana in 2000, Maifredi returned to the coaching bench for a spare game, co-training with assistant coach Fabio Micarelli after Brescia's head coach Marco Giampaolo failed to report for three days. The next day, Brescia appointed Maifredi as new head coach, thus ending a 13-year absence of his from head coaching roles into football. His period as a manager was only on a caretaker basis, as he left after only one game – a 0–2 loss to Latina – to leave room for new boss Cristiano Bergodi.

== Style of management ==
Maifredi's footballing approach, which made use of tactics based on a defensive line which employed zonal marking, and an overall fast, attractive, and dynamic playing style, has been famously described as calcio champagne ("champagne wine football", in Italian) in the media; this was due to both his teams' prominent attacking and entertaining style of play, and also as a reference to his former professional career as a champagne wine representative for Veuve Clicquot Ponsardin. His tactics were likened to the system used by Arrigo Sacchi in the Italian media. During his time with Orceana and Bologna, Maifredi used a 4–3–3 formation. With Juventus, he instead used a 4–2–2–2 formation. His teams often used sweeper-keeper.

== Outside of football ==
In 2003, during the Italian entertainment show Quelli che... il Calcio, which was presented by Simona Ventura at the time, Maifredi jokingly coached a team of former footballers, known as the "Maifredi Team", that reproduced the goals of the day to the viewers. He later also worked as a pundit for Mediaset Premium.
