= Giancarlo Marocchi =

Italian footballer

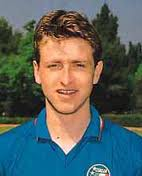
- Marocchi with Italy at the 1990 FIFA World Cup

Personal information
- Full name: Giancarlo Marocchi
- Date of birth: 4 July 1965 (age 61)
- Place of birth: Imola, Italy
- Height: 1.79 m (5 ft 10 in)
- Position: Midfielder

Youth career
- Bologna

Senior career*
Years	Team	Apps	(Gls)
1982–1988	Bologna	171	(13)
1988–1996	Juventus	213	(15)
1996–2000	Bologna	116	(5)
Total		500	(33)

International career
1988–1991	Italy	11	(0)
Medal record
Men's football
Representing Italy
FIFA World Cup
Third place	1990 Italy
- * Club domestic league appearances and goals

Giancarlo Marocchi Cavaliere OMRI (Italian pronunciation: [dʒaŋˈkarlo maˈrɔkki]; born 4 July 1965) is an Italian former professional footballer, who played as a central midfielder, and TV pundit. Throughout his club career, he played for Juventus, the club with which he won a Scudetto, two Coppe Italia, one UEFA Champions League, and two UEFA Cups; he also played for his home-town club Bologna, on two occasions. At international level, he represented Italy at the 1990 FIFA World Cup, where they finished in third place on home soil.

== Club career ==
After starting out in the Bologna youth system, Marocchi played for Bologna (1982–88, 1996–2000) and Juventus (1988–96) throughout his career. In 18 seasons as a professional he collected 500 appearances in league play with 33 goals; 287 with Bologna (18 goals) and 213 with Juventus (15 goals). In Serie A he racked up 329 appearances and 20 goals. In his first spell with Bologna, he won the Serie B title during the 1987–88 season, earning promotion to Serie A. Upon returning to the club, he won the UEFA Intertoto Cup in 1998 as the club's captain, after inheriting the armband from Roberto Baggio. He helped Bologna to finish the league season in 8th place, earning a spot in the 1998–99 UEFA Cup, where they reached the semi-finals, losing out to Olympique Marseille; during the match he was sent-off, receiving a four-match suspension. He also helped Bologna to reach the semi-finals of the 1998–99 Coppa Italia. With Juventus, Marocchi enjoyed a successful eight season spell, featuring as a starter under managers Dino Zoff, Maifredi and Trapattoni, even wearing the number 10 shirt on occasion during the 1989–90 season, although he began to be deployed with less frequency under Trapattoni and Lippi in later years; with the club, he won a Coppa Italia and an UEFA Cup in 1990, another UEFA Cup in 1993, a Scudetto-Coppa Italia double in 1995, as well as the Supercoppa Italiana and the UEFA Champions League in his final season with the club, in 1996. He retired from professional football in 2000.

== International career ==
Marocchi earned 11 caps for the Italy national football team from 1988 to 1991, and was included by manager Azeglio Vicini in the 1990 FIFA World Cup squad, a tournament in which Italy reached the semi-finals, finishing in third place on home soil. He failed to make an appearance in the tournament, however, due to the presence of Giuseppe Giannini, Nicola Berti, and Carlo Ancelotti in midfield. He made his debut in a 2–0 win over Scotland on 22 December 1988, and he played his final match for Italy on 13 February 1991, in a home 0–0 draw against Belgium, in Terni.

== After retirement ==
After retiring from professional football, Marocchi worked for his former club Bologna as a sporting director, in addition to other managerial positions; he also worked as a scout, as a coach, and with the youth sector. Currently, he works as TV pundit for the Italian broadcaster SKY Sport Italia.

== Style of play ==
During his career, he was considered to be a dynamic, talented, and hard-working central or box-to-box midfielder, although he was not known as the most creative player, Marocchi was known for his consistency, and was notable for his capability of both breaking down the opposition's play as well as subsequently starting attacking plays for his own team after winning back possession.

== Honours ==
Juventus

- Serie A: 1994–95
- Coppa Italia: 1989–90, 1994–95
- UEFA Champions League: 1995–96
- UEFA Cup: 1989–90, 1992–93

Bologna

- Serie B: 1987–88
- UEFA Intertoto Cup: 1998

Italy

- FIFA World Cup third place: 1990

Orders

- 5th Class / Knight: Cavaliere Ordine al Merito della Repubblica Italiana: 1991
