= Davide Micillo =

Italian footballer (born 1971)

Personal information
- Date of birth: 17 April 1971 (age 55)
- Place of birth: Vercelli, Italy
- Height: 1.91 m (6 ft 3 in)
- Position: Goalkeeper

Senior career*
Years	Team	Apps	(Gls)
1989–1991	Juventus	0	(0)
1991–1993	Ancona	9	(0)
1993–1994	Ravenna	37	(0)
1994–1995	Genoa	18	(0)
1995–1996	Cesena	37	(0)
1996–1997	Atalanta	11	(0)
1997–1998	Reggina	36	(0)
1998	Atalanta	0	(0)
1999–2001	Parma	1	(0)
2001–2002	Cosenza	13	(0)
2002–2003	Brescia	8	(0)
2003–2004	Ascoli	44	(0)
2005	Catanzaro	5	(0)
2005–2008	Novara	62	(0)
2008–2009	Borgomanero		
- * Club domestic league appearances and goals

Davide Micillo (born 17 April 1971) is an Italian former professional footballer who played as a goalkeeper. Following his retirement, he worked as a manager.

== Career ==
Micillo was born in Vercelli. Throughout his career, he played for a number of Italian clubs, including as a reserve goalkeeper for Serie A clubs Juventus (1989–91) (and Parma (1999–2001). He last played for A.S.D.C. Borgomanero, in Serie D

Although he was never capped for the Italy senior team, he represented Italy at under-17 level. Following his retirement in 2008, he worked as a manager, and subsequently as a goalkeeping coach.

== Honours ==
=== Club ===
Parma

- Coppa Italia: 1998–99
- UEFA Cup: 1998–99
- Supercoppa Italiana: 1999.
