= Angelo Alessio =

Italian football manager and player (born 1965)

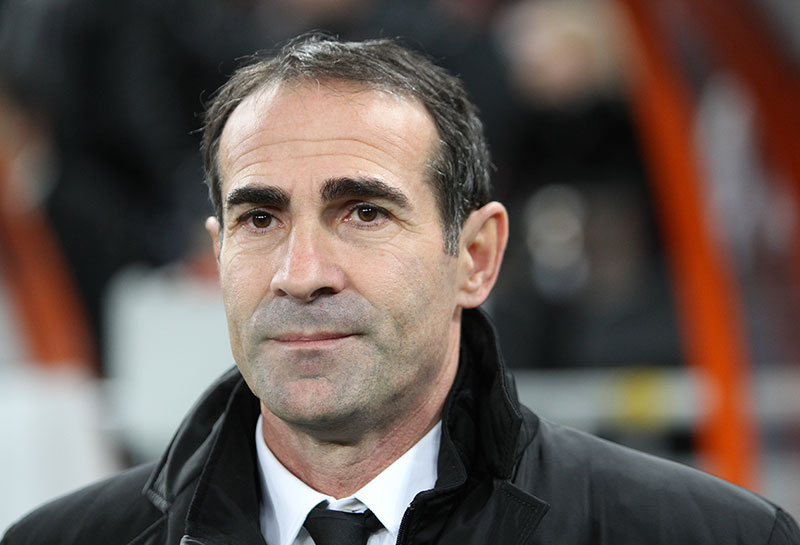
- Alessio in 2012

Personal information
- Date of birth: 29 April 1965 (age 61)
- Place of birth: Capaccio, Italy
- Height: 1.81 m (5 ft 11 1/2 in)
- Position: Midfielder

Senior career*
Years	Team	Apps	(Gls)
1984–1987	Avellino	48	(7)
1987–1992	Juventus	99	(11)
1988–1989	→ Bologna (loan)	29	(4)
1992–1995	Bari	77	(12)
1995–1997	Cosenza	57	(15)
1997	Avellino	5	(1)
1997–1998	Modena	18	(1)
Total		333	(51)

Managerial career
- 2002: Napoli (assistant)
- 2003: Napoli (assistant)
- 2004–2005: Imolese
- 2006–2007: Massese
- 2008: SPAL
- 2010–2011: Siena (assistant)
- 2011–2014: Juventus (assistant)
- 2012: Juventus (caretaker)
- 2014–2016: Italy (assistant)
- 2016–2018: Chelsea (assistant)
- 2019: Kilmarnock
- 2021–2022: Persija Jakarta
- * Club domestic league appearances and goals

Angelo Alessio (born 29 April 1965 in Capaccio) is an Italian football manager and former player.

== Playing career ==
A central midfielder, Alessio started his professional career with then-Serie A club Avellino in 1984. He was then signed by Italian powerhouse Juventus in 1987, with whom he played until 1992 (except for a season loan at Bologna in 1988–89), winning a Coppa Italia–UEFA Cup double in 1990. He then moved to Serie A club Bari, before to join Cosenza in the Serie B and then returning to Avellino (now in Serie C1) in 1997. He ended his career in 1998 after a season with Modena.

== Coaching career ==
After retirement, Alessio joined Napoli as a coaching staff member, first in charge of the youth teams and subsequently as a first team assistant. He then served as head coach for a number of Serie C2 teams (Imolese, Massese, SPAL); however it was not until his combination with Antonio Conte at Siena where his talents were truly noticed.

After achieving promotion out of the Serie B under Conte with Siena, the pair accepted the job at Juventus. At Juventus, Alessio enjoyed three consecutive years of Serie A domination, with three league titles and two Italian Super Cups. After three years at Juventus, in which he once managed as caretaker from October 2012 to December 2012, he again joined Conte at the Italy national football team. After a somewhat successful term and Italy's exit out of the Euros, Alessio parted with Italy and again to followed Conte to Chelsea. In January 2019 he confirmed his intention to start a career of his own as a head coach, thus effectively ending his long-time collaboration with Conte.

On 16 June 2019, Alessio was named manager of Scottish Premiership club Kilmarnock. In his first matches in charge, Kilmarnock lost in Europa League qualification to Welsh Premier League club Connah's Quay Nomads. Alessio was sacked by Kilmarnock in December 2019, with the team sitting in fifth place.

On 10 June 2021, Alessio was named head coach of Liga 1 club Persija Jakarta.

== Style of play ==
A versatile player, Alessio was known for his willingness to play not only anywhere in midfield, but also in almost any position across the entire pitch. Usually deployed as a central midfielder, he was also frequently played as a second striker during his time with Avellino.

== Managerial statistics ==
As of match played 15 January 2022

Managerial record by team and tenure
Team	Nat	From	To	Record								Ref
Team	Nat	From	To	G	W	D	L	GF	GA	GD	Win %	Ref
Imolese	(Italy)	1 July 2004	30 June 2005	42	10	16	16	39	47	−8	23.81	
Massese	(Italy)	1 July 2006	30 June 2007	34	9	14	11	32	39	−7	26.47	
SPAL	(Italy)	26 February 2008	30 June 2008	11	4	4	3	13	13	+0	36.36	
Kilmarnock	(Scotland)	16 June 2019	17 December 2019	22	8	6	8	20	24	−4	36.36	
Persija Jakarta	(Indonesia)	10 June 2021	19 January 2022	20	7	8	5	23	19	+4	35.00	
Career Total				129	38	48	43	127	142	−15	29.46	-

== Honours ==
Avellino

- Torneo Estivo del 1986: 1986

Juventus

- Coppa Italia: 1989–90
- UEFA Cup: 1989–90
