= Roberto Galia =

Italian footballer (born 1963)

Personal information
- Date of birth: 16 February 1963 (age 63)
- Place of birth: Trapani, Italy
- Height: 1.75 m (5 ft 9 in)
- Positions: Midfielder; defender

Senior career*
Years	Team	Apps	(Gls)
1980–1983	Como	56	(6)
1983–1986	Sampdoria	71	(2)
1986–1988	Verona	57	(7)
1988–1994	Juventus	157	(5)
1994	Ascoli	0	(0)
1994–1998	Como	92	(1)
Total		433	(21)

International career
1992	Italy	3	(0)

Managerial career
- 2003–2004: Como
- 2004–2006: FC Chiasso
- 2007: Pro Vercelli
- 2007–?: Insubria
- 2015–2016: Como youth
- * Club domestic league appearances and goals

Roberto Galia (Italian pronunciation: [roˈbɛrto ɡaˈliːa]; born 16 February 1963) is an Italian professional football coach and a former player, who played as a defender and as a midfielder.

== Club career ==
Roberto Galia made his Serie A debut with Como as a full-back on 10 May 1981, in a 1–0 home defeat to Napoli. He notably scored the decisive goal in a 2–1 against Bologna which saved his club from relegation on the final match-day that season, although the following season, he was unable to save his club from relegation. He transferred to Sampdoria in 1983, where he spent three seasons as a permanent member of the starting line-up, winning the 1984–85 Coppa Italia. In 1986, he moved to Hellas Verona under Osvaldo Bagnoli, where he was deployed as a defensive midfielder.

In 1988, Galia moved to Juventus; during his time at the club, he played and scored in the 1990 UEFA Cup Final, helping Juventus to win the title over Fiorentina. He also won the Coppa Italia that season, scoring the decisive goal in the final against Milan, as well as another UEFA Cup title with the club in 1993.

In 1994, he moved to Ascoli at the age of 31, only remaining with the club until November, before moving back to Como in 1995 for three seasons, playing in Serie B and Serie C1 with the club, before retiring in 1997, winning the Coppa Italia Serie C. In total, he amassed 300 appearances and 15 goals in Serie A, 65 appearances and 6 goals in Serie B, and 54 appearances in Serie C1. Following his retirement, he worked as a football coach.

== International career ==
Galia represented Italy on three occasions under Arrigo Sacchi, all while taking part in the 1992 U.S. Cup. He also represented Italy at the 1988 Summer Olympics, where the team reached the semi-finals, finishing in fourth place.

== Honours ==
Sampdoria

- Coppa Italia: 1984–85

Juventus

- Coppa Italia: 1989–90
- UEFA Cup: 1989–90, 1992–93
