= 1989–90 Coppa Italia =

Tournament details
- Country: Italy
- Dates: 23 August 1989 – 25 April 1990
- Teams: 48

Final positions
- Champions: Juventus (8th title)
- Runners-up: Milan

Tournament statistics
- Matches played: 54
- Goals scored: 132 (2.44 per match)
- Top goal scorer: Franco Baresi (4 goals)

The 1989–90 Coppa Italia was the 43rd edition of the Coppa Italia, a domestic cup competition held by the Italian Football Federation. It was won by Juventus, who defeated Milan in the final.

== Preliminary round ==
=== First round ===
Home team	Score	Away team
Internazionale (1)	1–0	Spezia (3)
Cosenza (2)	2–2 (6–5 pen.)	Reggiana (2)
Lazio (1)	2–0	Ancona (2)
Bologna (1)	2–0	Triestina (2)
Roma (1)	3–0	Modena (3)
Pisa (2)	1–1 (4–6 pen.)	Palermo (2)
Prato (3)	0–2	Sampdoria (1)
Genoa (1)	3–0	Padova (2)
Pescara (2)	2–1	Sambenedettese (3)
Lecce (1)	2–0	Brindisi (3)
Cagliari (2)	0–1 (a.e.t.)	Juventus (1)
Taranto (3)	0–0 (4–3 pen.)	Udinese (1)
Parma (2)	0–0 (6–7 pen.)	Milan (1)
Brescia (2)	1–3	Cremonese(1)
Avellino (2)	1–2	Cesena (1)
Messina (2)	2–1	Torino (2)
Atalanta (1)	4–0	Torres (3)
Bari (1)	3–1	Piacenza (3)
Licata (2)	1–3	Fiorentina (1)
Como (2)	2–1	Empoli (3)
Ascoli (1)	1–1 (11–10 pen.)	Catanzaro (2)
Barletta (2)	1–0	Hellas Verona (1)
Napoli (1)	1–1 (10–9 pen.)	Monza (2)
Foggia (2)	0–1	Reggina (2)

=== Second round ===
Home team	Score	Away team
Cosenza	0–2 (a.e.t.)	Internazionale
Lazio	1–2 (a.e.t.)	Bologna
Roma	4–0	Palermo
Genoa	0–1	Sampdoria
Pescara	1–1 (5–2 pen.)	Lecce
Juventus	2–1	Taranto
Cremonese	0–1	Milan
Cesena	1–4	Messina
Atalanta	1–0 (a.e.t.)	Bari
Fiorentina	1–1 (9–8 pen.)	Como
Ascoli	4–0	Barletta
Napoli	2–0	Reggina

== Group stage ==
=== Group 1 ===
Pos	Team	Pld	W	D	L	GF	GA	GD	Pts
1	Roma	2	1	0	1	4	3	+1	2
2	Internazionale	2	1	0	1	4	3	+1	2
3	Ascoli	2	1	0	1	2	4	−2	2

Results

3 January 1990

Roma	3–0	Ascoli

10 January 1990

Ascoli	2–1	Internazionale

24 January 1990

Internazionale	3–1	Roma

Roma advanced with the draw.

=== Group 2 ===
Pos	Team	Pld	W	D	L	GF	GA	GD	Pts
1	Napoli	2	1	1	0	3	1	+2	3
2	Bologna	2	1	0	1	3	4	−1	2
3	Fiorentina	2	0	1	1	3	4	−1	1

Results

3 January 1990

Bologna	3–2	Fiorentina

10 January 1990

Napoli	2–0	Bologna

24 January 1990

Fiorentina	1–1	Napoli

=== Group 3 ===
Pos	Team	Pld	W	D	L	GF	GA	GD	Pts
1	Milan	2	1	1	0	7	1	+6	3
2	Atalanta	2	0	2	0	1	1	0	2
3	Messina	2	0	1	1	0	6	−6	1

Results

3 January 1990

Messina	0–0	Atalanta

10 January 1990

Milan	6–0	Messina

24 January 1990

Atalanta	1–1	Milan

=== Group 4 ===
Pos	Team	Pld	W	D	L	GF	GA	GD	Pts
1	Juventus	2	2	0	0	3	1	+2	4
2	Sampdoria	2	1	0	1	3	3	0	2
3	Pescara	2	0	0	2	1	3	−2	0

Results

3 January 1990

Sampdoria	2–1	Pescara

10 January 1990

Pescara	0–1	Juventus

24 January 1990

Juventus	2–1	Sampdoria

== Semi-finals ==
=== First leg ===
31 January 1990
14:30 CET

Juventus	2–0	Roma
Casiraghi 5' 84'	Report

Stadio Comunale, Turin
Attendance: 12,844
Referee: Carlo Sguizzato
31 January 1990
14:30 CET

Milan	0–0	Napoli
	Report

Stadio Meazza, Milan
Attendance: 19,340
Referee: Fabio Baldas

=== Second leg ===
14 February 1990
14:30 CET

Napoli	1–3	Milan
Maradona 77' (pen.)	Report	Massaro 44' (pen.) 88' van Basten 79' (pen.)

Stadio San Paolo, Naples
Attendance: 49,376
Referee: Tullio Lanese
14 February 1990
14:30 CET

Roma	3–2	Juventus
Di Mauro 9'; D. Bonetti 27' (o.g.); Tempestilli 73'	Report	Alessio 51'; Schillaci 64'

Stadio Olimpico, Rome
Attendance: 12,844
Referee: Luigi Agnolin

== Final ==
=== First leg ===
28 February 1990
20:30 CET

Juventus	0–0	Milan
	Report

Stadio Comunale, Turin
Attendance: 30,105
Referee: Pietro D'Elia

=== Second leg ===
25 April 1990
16:00 CEST

Milan	0–1	Juventus
	Report	Galia 16'

San Siro, Milan
Attendance: 83,928
Referee: Pietro D'Elia

Juventus won 1–0 on aggregate.

== Top goalscorers ==
Rank	Player	Club	Goals
1	(Italy) Franco Baresi	Milan	4
2	(Italy) Daniele Massaro	Milan	3
2	(Italy) Fabrizio Di Mauro	Roma	3
2	(Italy) Ruggiero Rizzitelli	Roma	3
2	(Italy) Igor Protti	Messina	3
2	(Soviet Union) Oleksandr Zavarov	Juventus	3
2	(Socialist Federal Republic of Yugoslavia) Borislav Cvetković	Ascoli	3
