= 1984–85 Liverpool F.C. season =

English football club season

Liverpool F.C.
1984–85 season
- Chairman: John W Smith
- Manager: Joe Fagan
- First Division: 2nd
- FA Charity Shield: Runners-up
- FA Cup: Semi-finals
- League Cup: Third round
- European Super Cup: Runners-up
- European Cup: Runners-up
- Intercontinental Cup: Runners-up
- Top goalscorer: League: John Wark (18); All: John Wark (27)
Home colours	Away colours

The 1984–85 season was Liverpool Football Club's 93rd season in existence and their 23rd consecutive season in the First Division. As European champions, Liverpool took part in the 1984 Intercontinental Cup in December 1984 against Independiente in Tokyo, where they lost 1–0.

Liverpool reached the 1985 European Cup Final where they faced Juventus. They lost the match 1–0, but the game was overshadowed by crowd trouble where thirty-nine Juventus fans died. Just hours before the match, Liverpool manager Joe Fagan had announced he would retire at the end of the season.

== Squad ==
=== Goalkeepers ===
- (England) Bob Bolder
- (South Africa) Bruce Grobbelaar
- (England) Chris Pile

=== Defenders ===
- (Republic of Ireland) Jim Beglin
- (Scotland) Gary Gillespie
- (Scotland) Alan Hansen
- (England) Alan Kennedy
- (Republic of Ireland) Mark Lawrenson
- (Scotland) John McGregor
- (England) Phil Neal

=== Midfielders ===
- (Australia) Craig Johnston
- (England) Sammy Lee
- (Scotland) Kevin MacDonald
- (Denmark) Jan Mølby
- (Scotland) Steve Nicol
- (Scotland) John Wark
- (Republic of Ireland) Ronnie Whelan

=== Attackers ===
- (Scotland) Kenny Dalglish
- (England) David Hodgson
- (Republic of Ireland) Michael Robinson
- (Wales) Ian Rush
- (England) Paul Walsh
- (England) David West

== Squad statistics ==
=== Appearances and goals ===
No.	Pos	Nat	Player	Total		Division 1		FA Cup		Charity Shield		League Cup		European Cups		World Club Champ.	
No.	Pos	Nat	Player	Apps	Goals	Apps	Goals	Apps	Goals	Apps	Goals	Apps	Goals	Apps	Goals	Apps	Goals
	DF	(Republic of Ireland) IRL	Jim Beglin	15	2	10+0	1	2+0	0	0+0	0	0+0	0	3+0	1	0+0	0
	FW	(Scotland) SCO	Kenny Dalglish	53	6	36+0	6	7+0	0	1+0	0	1+0	0	7+0	0	1+0	0
	DF	(Scotland) SCO	Gary Gillespie	24	1	10+2	1	3+1	0	0+0	0	3+0	0	2+2	0	1+0	0
	GK	(Zimbabwe) ZIM	Bruce Grobbelaar	64	0	42+0	0	7+0	0	1+0	0	3+0	0	10+0	0	1+0	0
	DF	(Scotland) SCO	Alan Hansen	62	0	41+0	0	7+0	0	1+0	0	2+0	0	10+0	0	1+0	0
	MF	(Australia) AUS	Craig Johnston	17	0	11+0	0	0+0	0	0+0	0	1+0	0	1+3	0	1+0	0
	DF	(England) ENG	Alan Kennedy	49	1	32+0	1	5+0	0	1+0	0	3+0	0	7+0	0	1+0	0
	DF	(Republic of Ireland) IRL	Mark Lawrenson	50	2	33+0	1	4+0	0	1+0	0	2+0	0	10+0	1	0+0	0
	MF	(England) ENG	Sammy Lee	25	0	16+1	0	1+0	0	1+0	0	2+0	0	4+0	0	0+0	0
	MF	(Scotland) SCO	Kevin MacDonald	24	0	13+0	0	7+0	0	0+0	0	0+0	0	4+0	0	0+0	0
	MF	(Denmark) DEN	Jan Mølby	24	1	19+3	1	0+0	0	0+0	0	0+1	0	0+0	0	1+0	0
	DF	(England) ENG	Phil Neal	64	5	42+0	4	7+0	1	1+0	0	3+0	0	10+0	0	1+0	0
	MF	(Scotland) SCO	Steve Nicol	48	7	29+2	5	6+0	0	1+0	0	2+0	0	7+0	2	1+0	0
	FW	(Republic of Ireland) IRL	Michael Robinson	10	1	3+3	0	0+0	0	0+0	0	3+0	1	1+0	0	0+0	0
	FW	(Wales) WAL	Ian Rush	44	26	28+0	14	6+0	7	1+0	0	1+0	0	7+0	5	1+0	0
	FW	(England) ENG	Paul Walsh	39	13	22+4	8	1+2	2	0+1	0	2+0	0	7+0	3	0+0	0
	MF	(Scotland) SCO	John Wark	63	27	40+0	18	7+0	4	1+0	0	3+1	0	10+0	5	1+0	0
	MF	(Republic of Ireland) IRL	Ronnie Whelan	59	12	35+2	7	7+0	4	1+0	0	3+0	1	10+0	0	0+1	0

== League table ==
Pos	Team	Pld	W	D	L	GF	GA	GD	Pts	Qualification or relegation
1	Everton (C)	42	28	6	8	88	43	+45	90	Qualified for the Football League Super Cup and disqualified from the European Cup
2	Liverpool	42	22	11	9	68	35	+33	77	Qualified for the Football League Super Cup and disqualified from the UEFA Cup
3	Tottenham Hotspur	42	23	8	11	78	51	+27	77	Qualified for the Football League Super Cup and disqualified from the UEFA Cup
4	Manchester United (Note: Manchester United would have qualified for the Cup Winners' Cup as FA Cup winners.)	42	22	10	10	77	47	+30	76	Qualified for the Football League Super Cup and disqualified from the European Cup Winners' Cup
5	Southampton	42	19	11	12	56	47	+9	68	Qualified for the Football League Super Cup and disqualified from the UEFA Cup

Source: World Football
Rules for classification: 1) Points; 2) Goal difference; 3) Goals scored
(C) Champions

== Results ==
=== First Division ===
Date	Opponents	Venue	Result	Scorers	Attendance	Report 1	Report 2
25-Aug-84	Norwich City	A	3–3	Own goal 2' Dalglish 24' Neal (pen 67)	22,005	Report	Report
27-Aug-84	West Ham United	H	3–0	Walsh 1' Wark 75', 85'	32,633	Report	Report
01-Sep-84	Queens Park Rangers	H	1–1	Whelan 82'	33,982	Report	Report
04-Sep-84	Luton Town	A	2–1	Neal (pen 47) Dalglish 71'	14,127	Report	Report
08-Sep-84	Arsenal	A	1–3	Kennedy 82'	50,006	Report	Report
15-Sep-84	Sunderland	H	1–1	Walsh 17'	34,044	Report	Report
22-Sep-84	Manchester United	A	1–1	Walsh 73'	56,638	Report	Report
29-Sep-84	Sheffield Wednesday	H	0–2		40,196	Report	Report
06-Oct-84	West Bromwich Albion	H	0–0		29,346	Report	Report
12-Oct-84	Tottenham Hotspur	A	0–1		28,599	Report	Report
20-Oct-84	Everton	H	0–1		45,545	Report	Report
28-Oct-84	Nottingham Forest	A	2–0	Whelan 36' Rush 50'	19,838	Report	Report
03-Nov-84	Stoke City	A	1–0	Whelan 86'	20,611	Report	Report
10-Nov-84	Southampton	H	1–1	Rush 46'	36,382	Report	Report
18-Nov-84	Newcastle United	A	2–0	Nicol 24' Wark 89'	28,003	Report	Report
24-Nov-84	Ipswich Town	H	2–0	Wark 41', 53'	34,918	Report	Report
01-Dec-84	Chelsea	A	1–3	Mølby 28'	40,972	Report	Report
04-Dec-84	Coventry City	H	3–1	Wark 8', 89' Rush (pen 23)	27,237	Report	Report
15-Dec-84	Aston Villa	A	0–0		24,007	Report	Report
21-Dec-84	Queens Park Rangers	A	2–0	Wark 38' Rush 60'	11,007	Report	Report
26-Dec-84	Leicester City	H	1–2	Neal (pen 60)	38,419	Report	Report
29-Dec-84	Luton Town	H	1–0	Wark 26'	35,403	Report	Report
01-Jan-85	Watford	A	1–1	Rush 88'	27,073	Report	Report
19-Jan-85	Norwich City	H	4–0	Wark 36' Rush 80', 89' Dalglish 86'	30,627	Report	Report
02-Feb-85	Sheffield Wednesday	A	1–1	Lawrenson 85'	48,246	Report	Report
12-Feb-85	Arsenal	H	3–0	Rush 32' Neal 52 Whelan 87'	28,645	Report	Report
23-Feb-85	Stoke City	H	2–0	Nicol 14' Dalglish 28'	31,368	Report	Report
02-Mar-85	Nottingham Forest	H	1–0	Wark (pen 49)	35,696	Report	Report
16-Mar-85	Tottenham Hotspur	H	0–1		43,852	Report	Report
23-Mar-85	West Bromwich Albion	A	5–0	Nicol 6' Dalglish 56' Wark 64', 70', 82'	20,500	Report	Report
31-Mar-85	Manchester United	H	0–1		34,886	Report	Report
03-Apr-85	Sunderland	A	3–0	Rush 1', 30' Wark 70'	24,096	Report	Report
06-Apr-85	Leicester City	A	1–0	Whelan 82'	22,942	Report	Report
20-Apr-85	Newcastle United	H	3–1	Wark 57' Gillespie 69' Walsh 80'	34,733	Report	Report
27-Apr-85	Ipswich Town	A	0–0		24,484	Report	Report
04-May-85	Chelsea	H	4–3	Whelan 4' Nicol 11', 27' Rush 68'	33,733	Report	Report
06-May-85	Coventry City	A	2–0	Walsh 44', 58'	18,951	Report	Report
11-May-85	Aston Villa	H	2–1	Whelan 66' Rush 68'	33,001	Report	Report
14-May-85	Southampton	A	1–1	Wark 31'	23,001	Report	Report
17-May-85	Watford	H	4–3	Rush 52', 81' Dalglish 57' Wark (pen 59)	29,130	Report	Report
20-May-85	West Ham United	A	3–0	Walsh 26', 36' Beglin 56'	22,408	Report	Report
23-May-85	Everton	A	0–1		51,045	Report	Report

=== FA Charity Shield ===
18 August 1984
15:00

Everton	1–0	Liverpool
Grobbelaar 55' (o.g.)	Report; Report

Wembley Stadium, London
Attendance: 100,000
Referee: Keith Hackett (Sheffield)

Everton	Liverpool

GK	1	(Wales) Neville Southall
DF	2	(England) Gary Stevens
DF	3	(England) John Bailey
DF	4	(Wales) Kevin Ratcliffe
DF	5	(England) Derek Mountfield
MF	6	(England) Peter Reid
MF	7	(England) Trevor Steven
FW	8	(England) Adrian Heath
FW	9	(Scotland) Graeme Sharp
MF	10	(England) Paul Bracewell
MF	11	(England) Kevin Richardson
Substitutes:
GK		(England) Jim Arnold
FW		(Scotland) Andy Gray
DF		(England) Alan Harper
MF		(Republic of Ireland) Kevin Sheedy
FW		(England) Ian Marshall
Manager:
(England) Howard Kendall

GK	1	(Zimbabwe) Bruce Grobbelaar
DF	2	(England) Phil Neal
DF	3	(England) Alan Kennedy
DF	4	(Republic of Ireland) Mark Lawrenson
MF	5	(Republic of Ireland) Ronnie Whelan
DF	6	(Scotland) Alan Hansen
FW	7	(Scotland) Kenny Dalglish
MF	8	(England) Sammy Lee	(substituted off) 53'
FW	9	(Wales) Ian Rush
MF	10	(Scotland) Steve Nicol
MF	11	(Scotland) John Wark
Substitutes:
FW		(England) Paul Walsh	(substituted on) 53'
FW		(England) David Hodgson
Manager:
(England) Joe Fagan

=== FA Cup ===
Date	Opponents	Venue	Result	Scorers	Attendance	Report 1	Report 2
05-Jan-85	Aston Villa	H	3–0	Rush 4', 74' Wark 49'	36,877	Report	Report
27-Jan-85	Tottenham Hotspur	H	1–0	Rush 17'	27,905	Report	Report
16-Feb-85	York City	A	1–1	Rush 52'	13,485	Report	Report
20-Feb-85	York City	H	7–0	Whelan 15', 55' Wark 28', 58', 79' Neal 72' Walsh 83'	43,010	Report	Report
10-Mar-85	Barnsley	A	4–0	Rush 55', 80', 84' Whelan 72'	19,838	Report	Report
13-Apr-85	Manchester United	N	2–2	Whelan 87' Walsh 119'	51,690	Report	Report
17-Apr-85	Manchester United	N	1–2	McGrath 39' (o.g.)	45,775	Report	Report

=== League Cup ===
Date	Opponents	Venue	Result	Scorers	Attendance	Report 1	Report 2
24-Sep-84	Stockport County	A	0–0		11,169	Report	Report
09-Oct-84	Stockport County	H	2–0	Robinson 97' Whelan 115'	13,422	Report	Report
31-Oct-84	Tottenham Hotspur	A	0–1		38,690	Report	Report

=== European Cup ===
Date	Opponents	Venue	Result	Scorers	Attendance	Report 1	Report 2
19-Sep-84	Lech Poznań	A	1–0	Wark 62'	35,000	Report	Report
03-Oct-84	Lech Poznań	H	4–0	Wark 13', 19', 89' Walsh 38'	22,143	Report	Report
24-Oct-84	Benfica	H	3–1	Rush 44', 71', 76'	27,733	Report	Report
07-Nov-84	Benfica	A	0–1		50,000	Report	Report
06-Mar-85	Austria Vienna	A	1–1	Nicol 86'	21,000	Report	Report
20-Mar-85	Austria Vienna	H	4–1	Walsh 16', 55' Nicol 39' Own goal 46'	32,761	Report	Report
10-Apr-85	Panathinaikos	H	4–0	Wark 35' Rush 48', 49' Beglin 85'	39,488	Report	Report
24-Apr-85	Panathinaikos	A	1–0	Lawrenson 61'	56,400	Report	Report

Final

29 May 1985
20:15 CEST

Liverpool (England)	0–1	(Italy) Juventus
	Report; Report	Platini 56' (pen.)

Heysel Stadium, Brussels
Attendance: 59,000
Referee: André Daina (Switzerland)

Liverpool	Juventus

GK	1	(Zimbabwe) Bruce Grobbelaar
RB	2	(England) Phil Neal (c)
LB	3	(Republic of Ireland) Jim Beglin
CB	4	(Republic of Ireland) Mark Lawrenson		(substituted off) 4'
RM	5	(Scotland) Steve Nicol
CB	6	(Scotland) Alan Hansen
CF	7	(Scotland) Kenny Dalglish
CM	8	(Republic of Ireland) Ronnie Whelan
CF	9	(Wales) Ian Rush
LM	10	(England) Paul Walsh		(substituted off) 46'
CM	11	(Scotland) John Wark	(yellow card) 38'
Substitutes:
MF	13	(England) Sammy Lee
DF	14	(Scotland) Gary Gillespie		(substituted on) 4'
MF	15	(Denmark) Jan Mølby
MF	16	(Australia) Craig Johnston		(substituted on) 46'
GK	17	(England) Chris Pile
Manager:
(England) Joe Fagan

GK	1	(Italy) Stefano Tacconi
DF	2	(Italy) Luciano Favero
DF	3	(Italy) Antonio Cabrini
MF	4	(San Marino) Massimo Bonini
DF	5	(Italy) Sergio Brio
DF	6	(Italy) Gaetano Scirea (c)
FW	7	(Italy) Massimo Briaschi	(substituted off) 84'
MF	8	(Italy) Marco Tardelli
FW	9	(Italy) Paolo Rossi	(substituted off) 89'
MF	10	(France) Michel Platini
FW	11	(Poland) Zbigniew Boniek
Substitutes:
GK	12	(Italy) Luciano Bodini
DF	13	(Italy) Nicola Caricola
FW	14	(Italy) Cesare Prandelli	(substituted on) 84'
MF	15	(Italy) Bruno Limido
MF	16	(Italy) Beniamino Vignola	(substituted on) 89'
Manager:
(Italy) Giovanni Trapattoni

=== Intercontinental Cup ===
9 December 1984
12:00 JST

Independiente (Argentina)	1–0	(England) Liverpool
Percudani 6'	Report; Report

National Stadium, Tokyo
Attendance: 62,000
Referee: Romualdo Arppi Filho (Brazil)

Independiente	Liverpool

GK	1	(Uruguay) Carlos Goyén
DF	2	(Argentina) Hugo Villaverde	(substituted off) 74'
DF	3	(Argentina) Carlos Enrique
DF	4	(Argentina) Néstor Clausen
DF	5	(Argentina) Enzo Trossero
MF	6	(Argentina) Claudio Marangoni
MF	7	(Argentina) Jorge Burruchaga
MF	8	(Argentina) Ricardo Giusti
FW	9	(Argentina) José Percudani
MF	10	(Argentina) Ricardo Bochini
FW	11	(Argentina) Alejandro Barberón
Substitutes:
DF	13	(Argentina) Pedro Monzón	(substituted on) 74'
Manager:
(Argentina) José Pastoriza Man of the Match: (Argentina) José Percudani (Independiente) Assistant referees:

GK	1	(Zimbabwe) Bruce Grobbelaar
RB	4	(England) Phil Neal
LB	6	(England) Alan Kennedy
CB	3	(Scotland) Gary Gillespie
LM	2	(Scotland) Steve Nicol
CB	5	(Scotland) Alan Hansen
CF	7	(Scotland) Kenny Dalglish
CM	8	(Denmark) Jan Mølby
CF	9	(Wales) Ian Rush
RM	10	(Australia) Craig Johnston
CM	11	(Scotland) John Wark	(substituted off) 76'
Substitutes:
MF	14	(Republic of Ireland) Ronnie Whelan	(substituted on) 76'
GK	12	(England) Bob Bolder
MF	13	(Scotland) Kevin MacDonald
FW	15	(Republic of Ireland) Michael Robinson
Manager:
(England) Joe Fagan

=== European Super Cup ===
16 January 1985
20:30 CET

Juventus (Italy)	2–0	(England) Liverpool
Boniek 39', 79'	Report; Report

Stadio Comunale, Turin
Attendance: 55,384
Referee: Dieter Pauly (West Germany)

GK	1	(Italy) Luciano Bodini
DF	2	(Italy) Luciano Favero
DF	3	(Italy) Antonio Cabrini
MF	4	(San Marino) Massimo Bonini
DF	5	(Italy) Sergio Brio
DF	6	(Italy) Gaetano Scirea
FW	7	(Italy) Massimo Briaschi
MF	8	(Italy) Marco Tardelli
FW	9	(Italy) Paolo Rossi
MF	10	(France) Michel Platini
MF	11	(Poland) Zbigniew Boniek
Substitutes:
GK	12	(Italy) Stefano Tacconi
DF	13	(Italy) Nicola Caricola
MF	14	(Italy) Cesare Prandelli
MF	15	(Italy) Bruno Limido
MF	16	(Italy) Beniamino Vignola
Manager:
(Italy) Giovanni Trapattoni

GK	1	(Zimbabwe) Bruce Grobbelaar
RB	2	(England) Phil Neal
LB	3	(England) Alan Kennedy
CB	4	(Republic of Ireland) Mark Lawrenson	(substituted off) 46'
RM	5	(Scotland) Steve Nicol
CB	6	(Scotland) Alan Hansen
CF	7	(England) Paul Walsh
LM	8	(Republic of Ireland) Ronnie Whelan
CF	9	(Wales) Ian Rush
CM	10	(Scotland) Kevin MacDonald
CM	11	(Scotland) John Wark
Substitutes:
DF	12	(Republic of Ireland) Jim Beglin
GK	13	(England) Bob Bolder
DF	14	(Scotland) Gary Gillespie	(substituted on) 46'
MF	15	(England) Sammy Lee
MF	16	(Denmark) Jan Mølby
Manager:
(England) Joe Fagan
