= 1985 European Cup final =

- Match programme cover
- Event: 1984–85 European Cup
| Liverpool | Juventus |
| (England) | (Italy) |
| 0 | 1 |
- Date: 29 May 1985
- Venue: Heysel Stadium, Brussels
- Referee: André Daina (Switzerland)
- Attendance: 58,000

The 1985 European Cup final was an association football match between Liverpool of England and Juventus of Italy on 29 May 1985 at the Heysel Stadium, Brussels, Belgium. It was the final match of the 1984–85 season of the European Cup, Europe's premier cup competition. Liverpool were the reigning champions and were appearing in their fifth final, having won the competition in 1977, 1978, 1981 and 1984. Juventus were appearing in their third European Cup final.

Each club needed to progress through four rounds to reach the final. Matches were contested over two legs, with a match at each team's home ground. Liverpool won the majority of their matches by more than two goals, except in the second round when they beat Portuguese team Benfica 3–2 on aggregate. All but one of Juventus' matches were also won by two goals or more; in the semi-finals, they beat French team Bordeaux 3–2 on aggregate.

The match is overshadowed for the disaster that occurred before the kick-off. Liverpool fans breached a fence separating the two groups of supporters and charged the Juventus fans. The resulting weight of people caused a retaining wall to collapse, killing 39 people and injuring hundreds. Despite calls for an abandonment, the match went ahead due to authorities and organisers' making a joint decision for public policy doctrine reasons after a state of siege in the city was declared. The disaster prompted UEFA to ban English clubs from European football for five years.

Watched by a crowd of 58,000, the first half was goalless. Juventus took the lead in the 56th minute when Michel Platini scored from a penalty after Gary Gillespie was adjudged to have brought down Zbigniew Boniek in the penalty area, although the foul was actually committed nearly a yard outside the area and the referee was far from the action. The score remained the same throughout the remainder of the match and Juventus won 1–0, achieving their first European Cup win and became the first club to have won all three major European trophies at the time (European Cup, UEFA Cup, and Cup Winners' Cup).

== Background ==
Liverpool were appearing in their fifth final, they were the reigning champions after beating Italian team Roma 4–2 in a penalty shoot-out after the 1984 final finished 1–1. Liverpool had also won the competition in 1977, 1978 and 1981. Juventus were appearing in their third European Cup final, having lost their previous appearances in 1973 and 1983. Since Juventus won the 1983–84 European Cup Winners' Cup, both teams had to face each other, during the season, in the 1984 European Super Cup at Juventus' home ground, the Stadio Comunale, due to both clubs experiencing fixture congestion, which was won 2–0 by the Torinese team with two goals from Zbigniew Boniek.

Liverpool had finished second behind local rivals Everton in the 1984–85 Football League First Division, and thus qualified for the UEFA Cup, but victory in the final would enable them to compete in the European Cup the following season. Juventus finished the 1984–85 Serie A in fifth position, which was outside of the European qualification positions. In order to participate in European competition in 1985–86, they needed to win the European Cup.

The final was to be played at the Heysel Stadium in Brussels, Belgium. Liverpool had objected to the choice of venue as they were concerned about the condition of the stadium, which was crumbling, and the decision to allocate a neutral section for Belgian fans.

== Route to the final ==
=== Liverpool ===
| Round | Opponents | First leg | Second leg | Aggregate score |
|---|---|---|---|---|
| 1st | Lech Poznań | 1–0 (a) | 4–0 (h) | 5–0 |
| 2nd | Benfica | 3–1 (h) | 0–1 (a) | 3–2 |
| Quarter-final | Austria Wien | 1–1 (a) | 4–1 (h) | 5–2 |
| Semi-final | Panathinaikos | 4–0 (h) | 1–0 (a) | 5–0 |

Liverpool were the reigning European champions; they defeated Roma to win the 1983–84 European Cup, and were also the reigning English champions, having won the English league during the same season. They were drawn against Polish team Lech Poznań in the first round, and won the first leg at Poznań's home ground, Stadion Lecha, 1–0. Liverpool won the second leg 4–0 with a hat-trick from John Wark and a goal from Paul Walsh at their home ground, Anfield, to win the tie 5–0 on aggregate.

Liverpool played Portuguese team Benfica in the second round. Liverpool won the first leg 3–1 in England with a hat-trick by Ian Rush. They lost the second leg 1–0 at Benfica's home ground, Estádio da Luz, but still progressed to the quarter-finals due to a 3–2 aggregate victory. Liverpool's opponents in the quarter-finals were Austria Wien of Austria. The first leg at Wien's home ground, the Gerhard Hanappi Stadium, was drawn 1–1, but a 4–1 victory in the second leg in England meant that Liverpool qualified for the semi-finals with a 5–2 aggregate win.

Panathinaikos of Greece were the opposition in the semi-finals. The first leg at Anfield was won 4–0 by Liverpool; Rush scored twice, and Wark and Jim Beglin each scored one goal. The second leg was held at the Olympic Stadium and was won 1–0 by Liverpool. Thus, Liverpool won the tie 5–0 on aggregate to progress to their fifth European Cup final and their second in succession.

=== Juventus ===
| Round | Opponents | First leg | Second leg | Aggregate score |
|---|---|---|---|---|
| 1st | Ilves | 4–0 (a) | 2–1 (h) | 6–1 |
| 2nd | Grasshopper | 2–0 (h) | 4–2 (a) | 6–2 |
| Quarter-final | Sparta Prague | 3–0 (h) | 0–1 (a) | 3–1 |
| Semi-final | Bordeaux | 3–0 (h) | 0–2 (a) | 3–2 |

Juventus gained entry to the competition by winning the 1983–84 Serie A, entering as Italian champions. Their opponents in the first round were Ilves of Finland. The first leg in Finland, held at the Ratina Stadion, was won 4–0 by Juventus with a hat-trick by Paolo Rossi and a goal from Michel Platini. They won the second leg 2–1 at their home ground, Stadio Comunale, to win the tie 6–1 on aggregate.

In the second round, Juventus were drawn against Swiss team Grasshopper. Juventus won the first leg 2–0 in Italy, and achieved a 4–2 victory in the second leg in Switzerland, which meant that they won the tie 6–2 on aggregate. Juventus' opponents in the quarter-finals were Sparta Prague of Czechoslovakia. Goals from Marco Tardelli, Paolo Rossi and Massimo Briaschi ensured a 3–0 victory for Juventus in the first leg in Italy. They lost the second leg at Sparta's home ground, Letná stadium 1–0, but progressed to the semi-finals due to a 3–1 aggregate victory.

In the semi-finals, Juventus played French team Bordeaux and won the first leg 3–0 in Italy with goals from Zbigniew Boniek, Briaschi and Platini. The second leg was held at Bordeaux's home ground, the Stade Chaban-Delmas. Despite winning the match 2–0, Bordeaux lost 3–2 on aggregate.

== Disaster ==
The neutral zone that had been allocated to Belgian fans was largely occupied by Juventus supporters, many of whom lived in Italy and travelled in Belgium only to see the match in the stadium. The neutral zone was in section Z, on the same side of the ground as the Liverpool fans. Thus, the two groups stood yards apart, separated only by chicken wire. At approximately 7 p.m., missiles began to be thrown between the two sets of fans; because the stadium was crumbling, fans could pick stones up and throw them across the divide.

The throwing became more intense as kick-off approached. Moments later, a group of Liverpool fans charged into section Z, causing the fans there to retreat. As they had nowhere to go, they moved towards the side perimeter wall. As more people moved up against the wall, it collapsed, which resulted in 39 deaths and injuries to 600 people. At the other end of the ground, Juventus fans began to riot in retaliation for the events in section Z. They advanced down the pitch towards the Liverpool fans and were stopped by the police. The resulting confrontation lasted two hours and was still going on when the match kicked off. Consequently, the Belgian government declared a state of siege in the City of Brussels.

== Match ==
=== Summary ===
The match was delayed for over an hour as a result of the disaster but was played for public policy doctrine reasons because officials felt that abandoning the match would result in further violence due to a joint arrangement between the European confederation, the Italian, English and Belgian national associations—the latter being responsible for organising the event—as well as the country's Ministry of the Interior, the city's mayor and police force despite Juventus' explicit request that the match not be played. Two minutes into the match, Liverpool defender Mark Lawrenson was replaced by Gary Gillespie after Lawrenson suffered a recurrence of a shoulder injury. Juventus deployed Zbigniew Boniek on the right-hand side of the pitch and Massimo Briaschi on the left. Juventus' plan was to use the pace of Briaschi to threaten Liverpool full-back Phil Neal. Juventus' first chance came in the 30th minute when Antonio Cabrini, advanced from the left-back position, but his shot was saved by Liverpool goalkeeper Bruce Grobbelaar. Liverpool immediately countered – John Wark ran onto Ronnie Whelan's chipped pass, but his shot was saved by Juventus goalkeeper Stefano Tacconi. Minutes later, Liverpool had another chance, but Whelan's shot was pushed over the Juventus goal by Tacconi.

Five minutes before half-time, Juventus were awarded a free-kick. Boniek, who had beaten three Liverpool players with a run, was brought down outside the Liverpool penalty area by Wark, who received a yellow card for the foul. The resulting free-kick came to nothing, and at half-time the score was 0–0. Almost immediately after the restart, Liverpool suffered another injury. Paul Walsh stretched to reach a pass from Neal, aggravated a stomach strain and was replaced by Craig Johnston. Juventus were gaining an ascendancy in the match, and in the 56th minute they were awarded a penalty kick. After getting on the end of a Platini long ball, Boniek again went on a run through the centre of the Liverpool defence and was brought down by Gillespie. Liverpool believed that the foul was outside the area, but the Swiss referee, from some 25 yards (22.86 m.) behind the ball, awarded the penalty. Michel Platini scored the subsequent penalty to give Juventus a 1–0 lead.

Liverpool tried to find a way back into the match. With 16 minutes left, Whelan was brought down in the Juventus penalty area by Massimo Bonini, but the referee decided that it was not a foul. Liverpool created more chances near the end of the match; Tacconi saved a shot from Whelan. Wark and Steve Nicol saw headers go wide of the Juventus goal. No further goals were scored and at full-time the score was 1–0 to Juventus, who had won their first European Cup and became the first club to win all three seasonal UEFA competitions.

=== Details ===
29 May 1985
20:15 CEST

| Liverpool (England) | 0–1 | (Italy) Juventus |
|---|---|---|
| | Report | Platini 58' (pen.) |

Heysel Stadium, Brussels
Attendance: 58,000
Referee: André Daina (Switzerland)

| Liverpool | Juventus |

| GK | 1 | (Zimbabwe) Bruce Grobbelaar |
| RB | 2 | (England) Phil Neal (c) |
| LB | 3 | (Republic of Ireland) Jim Beglin |
| CB | 4 | (Republic of Ireland) Mark Lawrenson | | (substituted off) 4' |
| RM | 5 | (Scotland) Steve Nicol |
| CB | 6 | (Scotland) Alan Hansen |
| CF | 7 | (Scotland) Kenny Dalglish |
| CM | 8 | (Republic of Ireland) Ronnie Whelan |
| CF | 9 | (Wales) Ian Rush |
| LW | 10 | (England) Paul Walsh | | (substituted off) 46' |
| CM | 11 | (Scotland) John Wark | (yellow card) 38' |
Substitutes:
| DF | 12 | (Scotland) Gary Gillespie | | (substituted on) 4' |
| GK | 13 | (England) Chris Pile |
| MF | 14 | (England) Sammy Lee |
| MF | 15 | (Denmark) Jan Mølby |
| MF | 16 | (Australia) Craig Johnston | | (substituted on) 46' |
Manager:
(England) Joe Fagan

| GK | 1 | (Italy) Stefano Tacconi |
| CB | 2 | (Italy) Luciano Favero |
| LM | 3 | (Italy) Antonio Cabrini |
| CM | 4 | (Italy) Massimo Bonini |
| CB | 5 | (Italy) Sergio Brio |
| SW | 6 | (Italy) Gaetano Scirea (c) |
| RM | 7 | (Italy) Massimo Briaschi | (substituted off) 84' |
| CM | 8 | (Italy) Marco Tardelli |
| CF | 9 | (Italy) Paolo Rossi | (substituted off) 89' |
| AM | 10 | (France) Michel Platini |
| SS | 11 | (Poland) Zbigniew Boniek |
Substitutes:
| GK | 12 | (Italy) Luciano Bodini |
| DF | 13 | (Italy) Nicola Caricola |
| MF | 14 | (Italy) Cesare Prandelli | (substituted on) 84' |
| MF | 15 | (Italy) Bruno Limido |
| MF | 16 | (Italy) Beniamino Vignola | (substituted on) 89' |
Manager:
(Italy) Giovanni Trapattoni

== Post-match ==
Despite being considered, from a sporting point of view, as one of the better European finals played until then, after the match, much discussion centred on the disaster that occurred before kick-off. UEFA was adamant that the Liverpool fans were responsible; UEFA official Gunter Schneider stated, "Only the English fans were responsible. Of that there is no doubt." British Prime Minister Margaret Thatcher put pressure on The Football Association to withdraw English clubs from European competition and two days later, UEFA banned English clubs for "an indeterminate period of time". On 6 June, FIFA extended the ban to worldwide matches, but this was modified a week later to exclude friendly matches and did not affect the England national team.

English clubs were banned indefinitely from European competition, with a condition that when the ban was lifted, Liverpool would serve an extra three-year ban. The ban eventually lasted for five years, clubs returning to European competition in the 1990–91 season. Liverpool returned to European competition a season later in the 1991–92 UEFA Cup.

== See also ==
- 1984–85 Liverpool F.C. season
- 1984–85 Juventus FC season
- 1985 European Cup Winners' Cup final
- 1985 Intercontinental Cup
- 1985 UEFA Cup final
- Liverpool F.C. in international football
- Juventus FC in international football

== Bibliography ==
- Graham, Matthew (1985). Liverpool. Twickenham: Hamlyn Publishing Group. ISBN 0-600-50254-6.
- Hale, Steve; Ponting, Ivan (1992). Liverpool In Europe. London: Guinness Publishing. ISBN 0-85112-569-7.
- Hutchings, Steve; Nawrat, Chris (1995). The Sunday Times Illustrated History of Football: The Post-War Years. London: Chancellor Press. ISBN 1-85153-014-2.
- Kelly, Stephen F. (1988). The Official Illustrated History of Liverpool F.C.: You'll Never Walk Alone. London: Queen Anne Press. ISBN 0-356-19594-5.
- Liversedge, Stan (1991). Liverpool: The Official Centenary History. London: Hamlyn Publishing Group. ISBN 0-600-57308-7.
