= 1984 European Super Cup =

- Match programme cover
- Event: European Super Cup
| Juventus | Liverpool |
| (Italy) | (England) |
| 2 | 0 |
- Date: 16 January 1985
- Venue: Stadio Comunale, Turin
- Referee: Dieter Pauly (West Germany)
- Attendance: 55,384

The 1984 European Super Cup was an association football match between Italian team Juventus and English team Liverpool, which took place on 16 January 1985 at the Stadio Comunale. The match was the annual European Super Cup contested between the winners of the European Cup and European Cup Winners' Cup. This was the first European Super Cup to be played over a single leg; due to fixture congestion, only the Turin leg was played.

Juventus were appearing in the Super Cup for the first time. Liverpool were appearing in the competition for the third time, they had won the competition in 1977, and lost in 1978 to Belgian team Anderlecht. Juventus won the 1983–84 European Cup Winners' Cup, beating Portuguese team Porto 2–1 in the final. Liverpool qualified by winning the 1983–84 European Cup. They beat Italian team Roma 4–2 in a penalty shootout after the final had finished 1–1.

Watched by a crowd of 55,384, Juventus took the lead in the first half when Zbigniew Boniek scored in the 39th minute. Boniek scored again in the second half to give Juventus a 2–0 lead which they held on to until the end of the match to win their first Super Cup. The two clubs met later in the season in the 1985 European Cup final, which resulted in the death of 39 spectators due to a disaster that occurred prior to kick-off. Juventus won the match 1–0.

== Match ==
=== Background ===
The European Super Cup was founded in the early 1970s, as a means to determine the best team in Europe and serve as a challenge to Ajax, the strongest club side of its day. The proposal by Dutch journalist Anton Witkamp, a football match between the holders of the European Cup and Cup Winners' Cup, failed to receive UEFA's backing, given the recent Cup Winners' Cup winners Rangers had been banned from European competition. (Note: In 1972, Rangers was banned from European competition for two years after fans clashed with Spanish police while celebrating the club's victory over Dynamo Moscow in the European Cup Winners' Cup final. The ban was later reduced to one year on appeal.) Witkamp nonetheless proceeded with his vision, a two-legged match played between Ajax and Rangers in January 1973. The competition was endorsed and recognised by UEFA a year later.

Juventus qualified for the Super Cup as the reigning European Cup Winners' Cup winners. They had remained unbeaten throughout the 1983–84 European Cup Winners' Cup, and beat Porto 2–1 in the final. It was Juventus' first appearance in the competition.

Liverpool had qualified for the competition as a result of winning the 1983–84 European Cup. They had beaten Roma 4–2 in a penalty shootout, after the match had finished 1–1. Liverpool were appearing in their third Super Cup. They won the competition on their first appearance in 1977, beating German team Hamburg 7–1 on aggregate. Their other appearance in 1978 resulted in a defeat to Belgian team Anderlecht.

Traditionally, the Super Cup was played over two legs, but due to both clubs experiencing fixture congestion, was played as a one-off match in Turin in January 1985. The city was chosen randomly at the suggestion of Juventus president Giampiero Boniperti and Liverpool chief executive officer Peter Robinson.

=== Summary ===
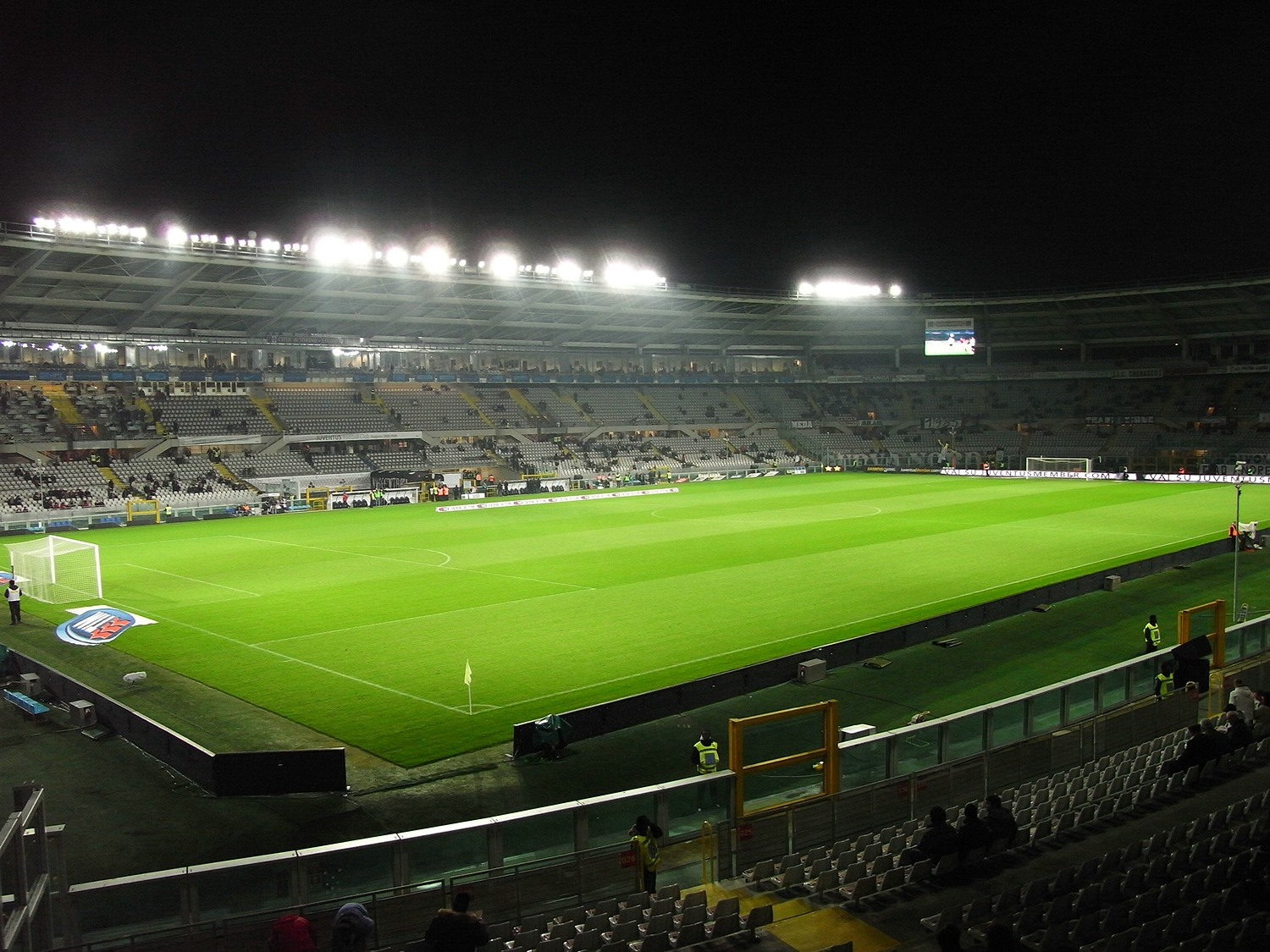
The Stadio Comunale where the match was held.

Bad weather in Turin created doubt about whether the match could be completed. However, the referee decided to go ahead with the match. Liverpool were without striker Kenny Dalglish who was suspended. Liverpool struggled to gain a foothold in the match in the first half and were behind when Juventus scored in the 40th minute. A mishit pass by Massimo Briaschi found Zbigniew Boniek whose subsequent shot from the edge of the Liverpool penalty area beat goalkeeper Bruce Grobbelaar to give Juventus a 1–0 lead. Liverpool had a chance to equalise before the end of the first half, but midfielder John Wark put his shot wide of the Juventus goal. Liverpool started the second half without defender Mark Lawrenson who had injured himself during the first half, he was replaced by Gary Gillespie. Liverpool tried to level the match in the second half, but their best chances came from midfielder Ronnie Whelan whose shots from distance did not result in any goals. Juventus extended their lead late in the second half when Boniek scored again. A cross from Briaschi found Boniek, whose shot beat Grobbelaar to extend Juventus' lead to 2–0. Five minutes later, Juventus nearly extended their lead again. However, striker Paolo Rossi's shot was saved by Grobbelaar. Juventus held onto their lead to win the match 2–0 and win the Super Cup.

=== Details ===
16 January 1985
20:30 CET

| Juventus (Italy) | 2–0 | (England) Liverpool |
|---|---|---|
| Boniek 39', 79' | Report |

Stadio Comunale, Turin
Attendance: 55,384
Referee: Dieter Pauly (West Germany)

| Juventus | Liverpool |

| GK | 1 | (Italy) Luciano Bodini |
| RB | 2 | (Italy) Luciano Favero |
| LB | 3 | (Italy) Antonio Cabrini |
| CM | 4 | (San Marino) Massimo Bonini |
| CB | 5 | (Italy) Sergio Brio |
| SW | 6 | (Italy) Gaetano Scirea (c) |
| RW | 7 | (Italy) Massimo Briaschi |
| CM | 8 | (Italy) Marco Tardelli |
| CF | 9 | (Italy) Paolo Rossi |
| AM | 10 | (France) Michel Platini |
| SS | 11 | (Poland) Zbigniew Boniek |
Substitutes:
| GK | 12 | (Italy) Stefano Tacconi |
| SW | 13 | (Italy) Nicola Caricola |
| CM | 14 | (Italy) Cesare Prandelli |
| CM | 15 | (Italy) Bruno Limido |
| CM | 16 | (Italy) Beniamino Vignola |
Manager:
(Italy) Giovanni Trapattoni

| GK | 1 | (Zimbabwe) Bruce Grobbelaar |
| RB | 2 | (England) Phil Neal (c) |
| LB | 3 | (England) Alan Kennedy |
| CB | 4 | (Republic of Ireland) Mark Lawrenson | | (substituted off) 46' |
| RM | 5 | (Scotland) Steve Nicol |
| CB | 6 | (Scotland) Alan Hansen | Booked |
| CF | 7 | (England) Paul Walsh |
| LM | 8 | (Republic of Ireland) Ronnie Whelan |
| CF | 9 | (Wales) Ian Rush |
| CM | 10 | (Scotland) Kevin MacDonald |
| CM | 11 | (Scotland) John Wark |
Substitutes:
| DF | 12 | (Republic of Ireland) Jim Beglin |
| GK | 13 | (England) Bob Bolder |
| DF | 14 | (Scotland) Gary Gillespie | | (substituted on) 46' |
| MF | 15 | (England) Sammy Lee |
| MF | 16 | (Denmark) Jan Mølby |
Manager:
(England) Joe Fagan

== Post-match ==
The two sides met again at the end of the season in the 1985 European Cup final. However, the events of the match were overshadowed by the disaster that occurred before kick-off. Liverpool fans breached a fence separating the two groups of supporters and charged the Juventus fans. The resulting weight of people caused a retaining wall to collapse, killing 39 people and injuring hundreds. English clubs were banned indefinitely from European competition, with a condition that when the ban was lifted, Liverpool would serve an extra three-year ban. The ban eventually lasted for five years with Liverpool serving an additional year, clubs returning to European competition in the 1990–91 season. Juventus won the match 1–0 to win the European Cup for the first time.

Liverpool finished second in the First Division during the 1984–85 Football League. They were thirteen points behind champions Everton. Juventus finished the 1984–85 Serie A in sixth place, seven points behind champions Hellas Verona.

== See also ==
- 1984–85 European Cup
- 1984–85 European Cup Winners' Cup
- 1984–85 Juventus FC season
- 1984–85 Liverpool F.C. season
- Liverpool F.C. in international football
- Juventus FC in international football

== Bibliography ==
- Hale, Steve; Ponting, Ivan (1992). Liverpool In Europe. London: Guinness Publishing. ISBN 0-85112-569-7.
- Hutchings, Steve; Nawrat, Chris (1995). The Sunday Times Illustrated History of Football: The Post-War Years. London: Chancellor Press. ISBN 1-85153-014-2.
