= 1984–85 Juventus FC season =

Italian football club season

Juventus
1984–85 season
- Owner: Agnelli family
- President: Giampiero Boniperti
- Head Coach: Giovanni Trapattoni
- Stadium: Comunale
- Serie A: 6th
- Coppa Italia: Quarter-finals
- European Cup: Winners (in 1985-86 European Cup)
- European Super Cup: Winners
- Top goalscorer: Michel Platini (18)
Home colours	Away colours

Juventus Football Club finished 6th in the 1984–85 Serie A season and won the European Cup for the first time at the Heysel Stadium. However, the season was marked by the Heysel Stadium disaster in which 39 people died, mostly Juventus supporters.

== Squad ==
Note: Flags indicate national team as defined under FIFA eligibility rules; some limited exceptions apply. Players may hold more than one non-FIFA nationality.

Pos.	Nation	Player
GK	ITA	Stefano Tacconi
GK	ITA	Luciano Bodini
DF	ITA	Luciano Favero
DF	ITA	Sergio Brio
DF	ITA	Gaetano Scirea (Captain)
DF	ITA	Antonio Cabrini
DF	ITA	Nicola Caricola
DF	ITA	Stefano Pioli
MF	ITA	Beniamino Vignola

Pos.	Nation	Player
MF	ITA	Giovanni Koetting
MF	ITA	Cesare Prandelli
MF	ITA	Bruno Limido
MF	ITA	Aldo Docetti
MF	SMR	Massimo Bonini
MF	ITA	Marco Tardelli
MF	FRA	Michel Platini
FW	ITA	Massimo Briaschi
FW	ITA	Paolo Rossi
FW	POL	Zbigniew Boniek

=== Transfers ===
In
Pos.	Name	from	Type
DF	Luciano Favero	Avellino	
FW	Massimo Briaschi	Genoa	
MF	Bruno Limido	Avellino	
DF	Stefano Pioli	Parma	

Out
Pos.	Name	to	Type
DF	Claudio Gentile	Fiorentina	
MF	Giuseppe Furino		retired
FW	Domenico Penzo	SSC Napoli	
FW	Michael Laudrup	SS Lazio	loan

== Competitions ==
=== Serie A ===
==== League table ====
Pos	Team	Pld	W	D	L	GF	GA	GD	Pts	Qualification or relegation
4	Sampdoria	30	12	13	5	36	21	+15	37	Qualification to Cup Winners' Cup
5	Milan	30	12	12	6	31	25	+6	36 (Note: Position defined by head-to-head points: Milan: 3 pts; Juventus: 1 pt.)	Qualification to UEFA Cup
6	Juventus (Note: Juventus gained entry to the 1985–86 European Cup as defending champions.)	30	11	14	5	48	33	+15	36	Qualification to European Cup
7	Roma	30	10	14	6	33	25	+8	34	
8	Napoli	30	10	13	7	34	29	+5	33	

Source: RSSSF.com
Rules for classification: 1) Points; 2) Head-to-head points; 3) Head-to-head goal difference; 4) Goal difference; 5) Goals scored; 6) Draw. (Note: Head-to-head record is used only after all the matches between the teams in question have been played).

==== Results by round ====
Round	1	2	3	4	5	6	7	8	9	10	11	12	13	14	15	16	17	18	19	20	21	22	23	24	25	26	27	28	29	30	31
Ground	H	A	H	A	H	A	H	A	H	A	H	A	H	A	H	H	A	H	A	H	A	H	A	H	A	H	A	H	A	H	A
Result	D	W	D	D	L	W	D	L	L	W	D	D	W	D	-	W	W	D	W	L	D	W	D	W	W	W	D	L	D	D	D
Position	10	3	3	7	7	7	5	8	11	8	8	8	7	7	7	7	6	6	5	7	7	6	6	6	4	4	4	5	4	6	6

Source: http://calcio-seriea.net/allenatori_squadra/1984/903/
A = Away; H = Home; W = Win; D = Draw; L = Loss; = 1985–86 European Cup; = 1985–86 UEFA Cup Following UEFA ranking changes and the English ban, Italy gained a third berth.

==== Matches ====
16 September 1984 1	Como	0–0	Juventus	Como
				Stadium: Stadio Como

23 September 1984 2	Juventus	5–1	Atalanta	Turin
	Boniek 1'; Platini 58', 79'; Magnocavallo 66' (o.g.); Scirea 74'		Magrin 71' (pen.)	Stadium: Stadio Comunale

30 September 1984 3	Avellino	0–0	Juventus	Avellino
				Stadium: Stadio

7 October 1984 4	Juventus	1–1	Milan	Turin
	Briaschi 32'		Virdis 85'	Stadium: Comunale

14 October 1984 5	Verona	2–0	Juventus	Verona
	Galderisi 62'; Elkjær 83'

21 October 1984 6	Cremonese	1–3	Juventus	Cremona
	Chiorri 48' (pen.)		Platini 27'; Vignola 61'; Briaschi 84'

28 October 1984 7	Juventus	1–1	Roma	Turin
	Briaschi 19'		Giannini 30'	Stadium: Comunale

11 November 1984 8	Internazionale	4–0	Juventus	Milan
	Rummenigge 12', 88'; Ferri 32'; Collovati 75'			Stadium: Giuseppe Meazza

18 November 1984 9	Juventus	1–2	Torino	Turin
	Platini 15'		Francini 48'; Serena 89'	Stadium: Comunale

25 November 1984 10	Udinese	0–3	Juventus	Udine
			Platini 1', 27'; Briaschi 88'	Stadium: Friuli

2 December 1984 11	Juventus	2–2	Ascoli	Turin
	Platini 51'; Rossi 55'		Cantarutti 20'; Dirceu 63'	Stadium: Comunale

16 December 1984 12	Fiorentina	0–0	Juventus	Florence
				Stadium: Artemio Franchi

23 December 1984 13	Juventus	2–0	Napoli	Turin
	Briaschi 42'; Platini 62'			Stadium: Comunale

6 January 1985 14	Sampdoria	1–1	Juventus	Genoa
	Souness 74'		Platini 5'	Stadium: Luigi Ferraris

13 January 1985 15	Juventus	v	Lazio	Turin
				Stadium: Comunale
Note: Match suspended at 23' due to poor field conditions.

20 January 1985 16	Juventus	2–0	Como	Turin
	Bonini 19'; Rossi 42'			Stadium: Comunale

27 January 1985 17	Atalanta	1–1	Juventus	Bergamo
	Magrin 14'		Briaschi 40'

30 January 1985 15	Juventus	1–0	Lazio	Turin
	Platini 70'			Stadium: Comunale
Note: Rescheduled from 13 January 1985

10 February 1985 18	Juventus	2–1	Avellino	Turin
	Platini 35' (pen.), 82'		Díaz 74'	Stadium: Comunale

17 February 1985 19	Milan	3–2	Juventus	Milan
	Virdis 3', 39'; Di Bartolomei 46' (pen.)		Platini 12'; Rossi 30'	Stadium: San Siro

24 February 1985 20	Juventus	1–1	Verona	Turin
	Briaschi 74'		Di Gennaro 76'	Stadium: Comunale

3 March 1985 21	Juventus	5–1	Cremonese	Turin
	Boniek 10'; Briaschi 14', 87'; Platini 40', 49' (pen.)		Finardi 12' (pen.)	Stadium: Comunale

17 March 1985 22	Roma	1–1	Juventus	Olimpico
	Nela 67'		Boniek 64'	Stadium: Rome

24 March 1985 23	Juventus	3–1	Internazionale	Turin
	Tardelli 40'; Boniek 62'; Briaschi 87'		Altobelli 38'	Stadium: Comunale

31 March 1985 24	Torino	0–2	Juventus	Turin
			Briaschi 11'; Platini 87' (pen.)	Stadium: Comunale

14 April 1985 25	Juventus	3–2	Udinese	Turin
	Boniek 33', 81'; Koetting 86'		Carnevale 20'; Zico 90'	Stadium: Comunale

21 April 1985 26	Ascoli	1–1	Juventus	Ascoli Piceno
	Nicolini 50'		Tardelli 22'

28 April 1985 27	Juventus	1–2	Fiorentina	Turin
	Briaschi 3'		Cecconi 37'; Passarella 77'	Stadium: Comunale

5 May 1985 28	Napoli	0–0	Juventus	Naples
				Stadium: San Paolo

12 May 1985 29	Juventus	1–1	Sampdoria	Turin
	Platini 57'		Scanziani 76'	Stadium: Comunale

19 May 1985 30	Lazio	3–3	Juventus	Rome
	Giordano 3', 68' (pen.); Podavini 74'		Platini 12'; Brio 34'; Scirea 61'	Stadium: Olimpico

=== Coppa Italia ===
Group phase

Group 7
Pos	Team	Pld	W	D	L	GF	GA	GD	Pts
1	Juventus	5	4	1	0	17	2	+15	9
2	Cagliari	5	3	0	2	7	6	+1	6
3	Atalanta	5	1	4	0	6	5	+1	6
4	Taranto	5	1	2	2	5	6	−1	4
5	Palermo	5	1	1	3	4	11	−7	3
6	Sambenedettese	5	0	2	3	1	10	−9	2

Eightfinals

13 February 1985	Campobasso	1–0	Juventus

27 February 1985	Juventus	4–1	Campobasso	Turin
				Stadium: Comunale

Quarterfinals

12 June 1985	Juventus	0–0	Milan	Turin
				Stadium: Comunale

19 June 1985	Milan	1–0	Juventus	Milan
				Stadium: San Siro

=== European Cup ===
First round

19 September 1984 1	FC Ilves (Finland)	0–4	(Italy) Juventus	Tampere, Finland
			Rossi 12', 21', 89'; Platini 37' (pen.)	Stadium: Tammela Stadion

3 October 1984 2	Juventus (Italy)	2–1 (6–1 agg.)	(Finland) FC Ilves	Turin, Italy
	Platini 58', 66'		Kuuluvainen 18'	Stadium: Stadio Olimpico di Torino

Second round

24 October 1984 1	Juventus (Italy)	2–0	(Switzerland) Grasshopper Zürich	Turin, Italy
	Vignola 26'; Rossi 27'			Stadium: Stadio Olimpico di Torino

7 November 1984 2	Grasshopper Zürich (Switzerland)	2–4 (2–6 agg.)	(Italy) Juventus	Zurich, Switzerland
	Koller 30'; Schällibaum 71'		Briaschi 21'; Vignola 40'; Platini 56', 86' (pen.)	Stadium: Hardturm-Stadion

Quarter-finals

6 March 1985 1	Juventus (Italy)	3–0	(Czechoslovakia) AC Sparta Prague	Turin, Italy
	Tardelli 35'; Rossi 64'; Briaschi 82'			Stadium: Stadio Olimpico di Torino

20 March 1985 2	AC Sparta Prague (Czechoslovakia)	1–0 (1–3 agg.)	(Italy) Juventus	Prague, Czechoslovakia
	Berger 77' (pen.)			Stadium: Stadion Letná

Semi-finals

10 April 1985 1	Juventus (Italy)	3–0	(France) Girondins de Bordeaux	Turin, Italy
	Boniek 28'; Briaschi 68'; Platini 71'			Stadium: Stadio Olimpico di Torino

24 April 1985 2	Girondins de Bordeaux (France)	2–0 (2–3 agg.)	(Italy) Juventus	Bordeaux, France
	Müller 24'; Battiston 80'			Stadium: Stade du Parc Lescure

==== Final ====
29 May 1985	Liverpool (England)	0–1	(Italy) Juventus	Brussels, Belgium
		Report MatchCentre	Platini 56' (pen.)	Stadium: Stade du Heysel; Attendance: 59,000; Referee: André Daina (Switzerland)

=== UEFA Super Cup ===
16 January 1985	Juventus (Italy)	2–0	(England) Liverpool	Turin, Italy
20:30 CET	Boniek 39', 79'	Report		Stadium: Stadio Olimpico di Torino; Attendance: 55,384; Referee: Dieter Pauly (West Germany)

== Statistics ==
=== Players statistics ===
No.	Pos	Nat	Player	Total		Serie A		Coppa		European Cup	
No.	Pos	Nat	Player	Apps	Goals	Apps	Goals	Apps	Goals	Apps	Goals
	GK	(Italy) ITA	Stefano Tacconi	24	-22	12	-16	7	-3	5	-3
	DF	(Italy) ITA	Luciano Favero	48	0	30	0	9	0	9	0
	DF	(Italy) ITA	Sergio Brio	24	2	17	1	3	1	4	0
	DF	(Italy) ITA	Gaetano Scirea	48	2	30	2	9	0	9	0
	DF	(Italy) ITA	Antonio Cabrini	47	1	30	0	8	1	9	0
	MF	(San Marino) SMR	Massimo Bonini	47	1	30	1	9	0	8	0
	MF	(Italy) ITA	Marco Tardelli	42	3	28	2	6	0	8	1
	MF	(France) FRA	Michel Platini	46	29	29+1	18	7	4	9	7
	FW	(Italy) ITA	Massimo Briaschi	43	22	27	12	7	7	9	3
	FW	(Italy) ITA	Paolo Rossi	42	10	27	3	6	2	9	5
	FW	(Poland) POL	Zbigniew Boniek	41	10	26	6	6	3	9	1
	GK	(Italy) ITA	Luciano Bodini	24	-22	18	-17	2	-2	4	-3
	MF	(Italy) ITA	Beniamino Vignola	40	5	11+16	1	9	2	4	2
	DF	(Italy) ITA	Nicola Caricola	22	0	7+6	0	5	0	4	0
	DF	(Italy) ITA	Stefano Pioli	24	1	5+9	0	7	1	3	0
	MF	(Italy) ITA	Giovanni Koetting	13	1	2+5	1	5	0	1	0
	MF	(Italy) ITA	Cesare Prandelli	19	0	1+10	0	4	0	4	0
	MF	(Italy) ITA	Bruno Limido	14	0	0+4	0	7	0	3	0
	MF	(Italy) ITA	Aldo Docetti	0	0	0	0	0	0	0	0
	DF	(Italy) ITA	Vincenzo Mastrototaro	0	0	0	0	0	0	0	0
	FW	(Italy) ITA	Mauro Deriggi	0	0	0	0	0	0	0	0
	FW	(Italy) ITA	Michele Scola	0	0	0	0	0	0	0	0

- Source: http://calcio-seriea.net/presenze/1984/903/
