= Sauchie =

Town in Clackmannanshire, Scotland

Coordinates: 56.128°N 3.781°W

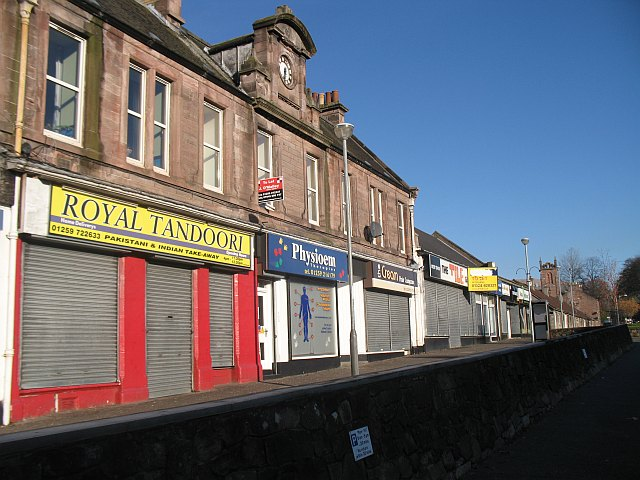
- Shops on Main Street

- Location within Clackmannanshire
- Population: 6,310
- OS grid reference: NS896944
- Council area: Clackmannanshire
- Lieutenancy area: Clackmannanshire
- Country: Scotland
- Sovereign state: United Kingdom
- Post town: ALLOA
- Postcode district: FK10
- Dialling code: 01259
- Police: Scotland
- Fire: Scottish
- Ambulance: Scottish
- UK Parliament: Alloa and Grangemouth
- Scottish Parliament: Clackmannanshire and Dunblane

Sauchie is a town in Clackmannanshire, in the Central Lowlands of Scotland. It lies north of the River Forth and south of the Ochil Hills, approximately 1 mile (1.6 km) north-east of Alloa. According to local authority statistics based on data from the National Records of Scotland, Sauchie had an estimated population of 6,310 in 2020.

== History ==
The lands of Sauchie are recorded in medieval charters. In 1321, Robert I (Robert the Bruce) granted the lands of Sauchie to Henry de Annand, a former Sheriff of Clackmannan.

Sauchie Tower dates from the 15th century and is designated as a Category A listed building by Historic Environment Scotland. The tower later became associated with the Schaw family, who moved to Newtonshaw in the 18th century.

Coal mining was historically significant in the area. In 1605, Archibald Campbell, 7th Earl of Argyll, arranged for coal from pits at Sauchie to be transported to Castle Campbell.

The Auchinbaird Windmill, also known as New Sauchie Windmill, dates from the late 17th or early 18th century and is a rare surviving example of a vaulted tower windmill in Scotland.

=== Town status recognition ===
In December 2025, an Early Day Motion in the UK Parliament welcomed the awarding of town status to Sauchie in Clackmannanshire and congratulated residents and Clackmannanshire Council.

== Sport ==
The town is home to Sauchie Juniors F.C., founded in 1960, which competes in the East of Scotland Football League. The club plays its home matches at Beechwood Park.

== Notable people ==
- Robert Carberry (born 1931), footballer
- Grant Gilchrist (born 1990), rugby union player
- Alan Hansen (born 1955), footballer
- John Hansen (born 1950), footballer
- Willie Morgan (born 1944), footballer
- William Schaw (c. 1550–1602), Master of Works to James VI of Scotland
- Robert Shaw (died 1527), Bishop of Moray
- John Stahl (1953–2022), actor
- David Wilson (born 1957), criminologist

== See also ==
- List of places in Clackmannanshire
