= John Hansen (footballer, born 1950) =

Scottish footballer

Personal information
- Full name: John Angus McDonald Hansen
- Date of birth: 3 February 1950 (age 76)
- Place of birth: Sauchie, Clackmannanshire, Scotland
- Position: Right-back

Youth career
- Sauchie Juniors

Senior career*
Years	Team	Apps	(Gls)
1967–1978	Partick Thistle	213	(6)

International career
1971–1972	Scotland	2	(0)
- * Club domestic league appearances and goals

John Angus McDonald Hansen (born 3 February 1950) is a Scottish former footballer who played professionally solely for Partick Thistle as a defender.

== Club career ==
The older brother of the more noted player Alan Hansen (who also began his career with Partick Thistle), John played as a right-back or centre-half. He attended a rugby-playing school (Alloa Academy) and only began to play football as a teenager, joining local club Sauchie Juniors before being brought to Firhill.

Hansen was part of the Thistle team that was relegated in 1970, promoted as lower division winners in 1971 and then defeated Celtic 4–1 in the 1971 Scottish League Cup Final. Between 1967 and 1978 he played 213 league games, scoring 6 goals in the process. He played alongside his younger brother for four seasons, during which the club were relegated in a league restructure in 1975 but bounced back as second-tier champions again in 1976 and finished fifth in the 1976–77 Scottish Premier Division.

Persistent knee injuries dogged his career; with various operations on his cartilage and cruciate ligament ending the possibility of a move to Manchester United, whilst also robbing him of the chance to compete in Europe following the League Cup win—eventually forcing his retirement from playing, aged just 27.

== International career ==
Hansen won two caps for Scotland under manager Tommy Docherty, playing against Belgium in a 1–0 victory in a European Championship Qualifier, and against Yugoslavia in a 2–2 draw in the Brazilian Independence Cup.

== Later life ==
Following his retirement as a player, Hansen spent some time working for Partick Thistle as the club's public relations officer. He is married to Sandra Ann and now lives in Surrey with his son Simon.
