= Alan Hansen =

Scottish footballer (born 1955)

Alan Hansen MBE
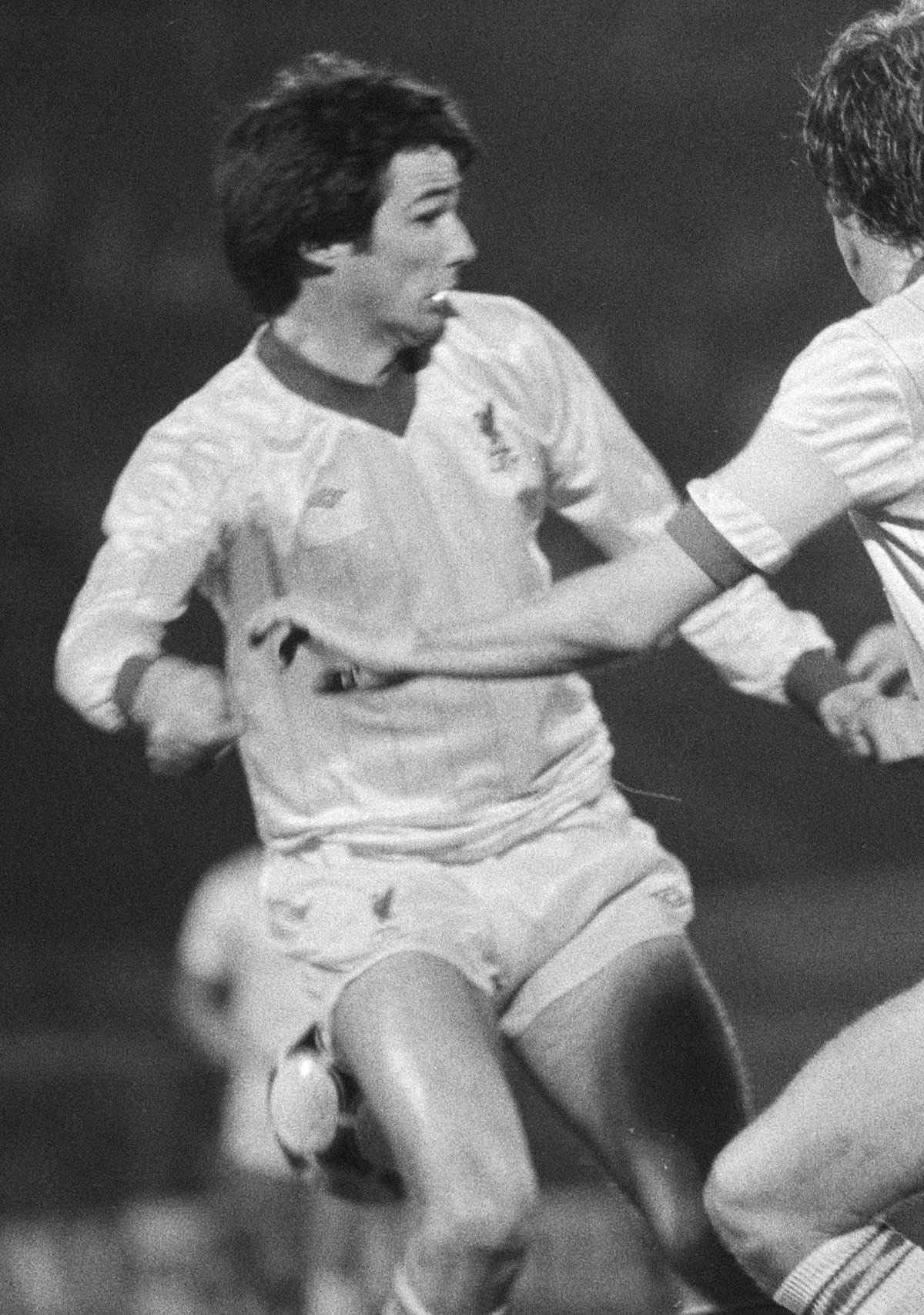
- Hansen playing for Liverpool in 1981

Personal information
- Full name: Alan David Hansen
- Date of birth: 13 June 1955 (age 71)
- Place of birth: Sauchie, Clackmannanshire, Scotland
- Height: 6 ft 2 in (1.88 m)
- Position: Centre-back

Youth career
- Sauchie Juniors

Senior career*
Years	Team	Apps	(Gls)
1973–1977	Partick Thistle	86	(6)
1977–1991	Liverpool	434	(8)
Total		520	(14)

International career
1975–1976	Scotland U23	3	(0)
1979–1987	Scotland	26	(0)
- * Club domestic league appearances and goals

Alan David Hansen MBE (born 13 June 1955) is a Scottish former football player and pundit. Regarded as one of the greatest defenders of all time, he enjoyed a highly decorated playing career, winning eight First Division titles, three European Cups, two FA Cups, four League Cups, and several other honours with Liverpool during their dominant era from the late 1970s until the late 1980s. He also represented Partick Thistle and the Scotland national team.

After retiring, Hansen became a well-known BBC television football pundit, most notably appearing on Match of the Day from 1992 to 2014, where he was known for his sharp analysis and frequent criticism of poor defending, often using terms like "diabolical" or "shocking" to describe lapses at the back.

== Early life ==
Hansen was born in Sauchie, Clackmannanshire, Scotland, and attended Lornshill Academy and supported Rangers growing up. His paternal grandfather was Danish. Hansen played his early football (along with his older brother John, a one-club player) at Scottish Junior league club, Sauchie Juniors near Alloa.

At the age of 15, Hansen ran into a plate-glass panel after playing volleyball and was left with a large scar on his forehead. The glass was in a brand-new youth club which Hansen attended. During his two-hour hospital stay he had 27 stitches in his head. He sued the education authority and won the case. Hansen stopped playing football between the ages of 15 and 17 and concentrated on playing golf, with aspirations of becoming a professional. His father and brother wanted Hansen to play football, so he accepted the offer of a trial with Hibernian when he was 17. Hibernian manager Eddie Turnbull offered Hansen a professional contract, but he refused because it would have stopped him from playing golf competitively.

== Club career ==
=== Partick Thistle ===
Hansen turned down the opportunity to study at the University of Aberdeen, in order to join his older brother John at Partick Thistle. During the summer while his application was being processed, he worked for six weeks in the offices of General Accident insurance — which he hated. As a trainee, Hansen attended the 1971 Scottish League Cup Final, seeing a Partick Thistle side that included his brother John create one of the biggest shocks ever in Scottish football by defeating favourites Celtic 4–1 at Hampden Park.

After breaking into the first team at Thistle, Hansen was watched by top clubs, including Bob Paisley's Liverpool. In 1975–76 season Hansen played 21 times as Thistle won the Scottish First Division championship to gain entry into the Scottish Premier Division. By the end of the following season Hansen had 35 first team appearances, before moving south of the border to Liverpool on 5 May 1977. After arriving at Anfield, the nickname which he loathed for years ("Stretch") was forgotten and a new nickname "Jockey" was born.

=== Liverpool ===
Liverpool signed Hansen for a fee of £100,000. He made his debut on 24 September 1977 in a league match at Anfield. Derby County were the visitors and were beaten by a single goal scored by Terry McDermott. Hansen scored his first goal the following month on 19 October during a European Cup 2nd round 1st leg tie at Anfield. He opened the scoring in the 14th minute as Liverpool defeated East German side Dynamo Dresden 5–1.

Hansen was put into the first team sporadically throughout the season. He was not in the side which lost the 1978 League Cup final replay to Nottingham Forest, but he was selected for the Liverpool side which won the 1978 European Cup Final 1–0 over FC Bruges at Wembley, on a goal by Kenny Dalglish. Hansen managed 18 appearances in the First Division that season, where Liverpool finished runners-up to Nottingham Forest.

In the following season, 1978–79, Hansen was a regular in the team as Liverpool regained the league title. The team's final points tally of 68 was a record under the two points for a win system, and they conceded only four goals at home at Anfield. When long-serving club captain Emlyn Hughes was sold to Wolves, Hansen became an automatic first-choice central defender in the team, and Liverpool's domination of English club football continued in the 1979–80 season with another league title.

In the 1980–81 season, Liverpool won two trophies, but did not win a third consecutive league title as Aston Villa finished as English champions. Liverpool won their first League Cup in 1981, defeating West Ham United 2–1 in a replay at Villa Park. Hansen also won his second European Cup winners medal in 1981, Liverpool defeating Real Madrid 1–0 at the Parc des Princes in Paris on 27 May.

The league title returned to Anfield in the 1981–82 season, and Liverpool also retained the League Cup in 1982 with a 3–1 win over Tottenham Hotspur, although Hansen missed this victory with injury. Liverpool did not retain the European Cup in 1982, surprisingly losing in the quarter-final to CSKA Sofia 2–1 on aggregate.

In the 1982–83 season, Liverpool once again took the league title and held on to the League Cup in 1983, defeating Manchester United 2–1 after extra-time in the final at Wembley. Bob Paisley, who signed Hansen for Liverpool in 1977, retired at the end of the 1982–83 season and was replaced as manager by long-serving coach Joe Fagan.

In the 1983–84 season, Liverpool completed a treble of trophies in Fagan's first season as manager, winning the league title, League Cup and European Cup. Hansen was involved in a controversial incident in the League Cup final at Wembley when he appeared to handle a shot on the goal line. Despite protests from opponents and Merseyside rivals Everton, no penalty was given. Liverpool won the final after a replay at Maine Road.

Liverpool reached the 1984 European Cup final after beating Romanian champions Dinamo Bucharest 3–1 on aggregate in the semi-final. The first leg at Anfield was an ill-tempered affair with Liverpool captain Graeme Souness breaking the jaw of a Bucharest midfielder. Hansen played in the European Cup final victory over A.S. Roma, which Liverpool won on a penalty shoot-out after the match ended 1–1 in front of a crowd of 69,000 at Roma's home stadium, the Stadio Olimpico.

Liverpool did not win a trophy in the 1984–85 season and were banned from all European competition after the 1985 European Cup Final which pitted Liverpool against the Italian giants Juventus at Heysel was preceded by rioting which caused the deaths of 39 people, including 32 Italian Juventus fans. Liverpool lost the match 1–0. Hansen would never play in a European tie again.

Manager Joe Fagan retired after the Heysel disaster, and Hansen's friend, teammate and fellow Scotsman Kenny Dalglish was appointed as player-manager. He gave Hansen the captaincy and the season ended in triumph, as in 1986 Liverpool became only the third side in the 20th century to complete a League and FA Cup "double", following Tottenham in 1961 and Arsenal in 1971. Hansen lifted both trophies as captain and earned his first FA Cup winners' medal, thereby completing the domestic set.

Liverpool failed to win a trophy in the 1986–87 season, losing the League Cup final at Wembley when Arsenal defeated them 2–1, while Merseyside rivals Everton took the league title. In the 1987–88 season they lost just twice in the league winning the title with Hansen as skipper. Liverpool also reached the FA Cup final, but were denied a second "double" when they were beaten 1–0 by Wimbledon in one of the competition's biggest shocks. Two days later, 31,000 attended Anfield for Hansen's testimonial match against an England XI preparing for UEFA Euro 1988.

Hansen was restricted to just six league appearances in the 1988–89 season as a result of a dislocated left knee sustained in a pre-season friendly against Atlético Madrid in Spain. Hansen played in the 1989 FA Cup final at Wembley, which Liverpool won 3–2 in extra-time against Everton, though Hansen did not lift the trophy as captain. The honour was given to teammate Ronnie Whelan who had deputised in Hansen's absence through injury and retained the role even after the club's first choice captain was fit again. Hansen did not have any objections to Whelan keeping the captaincy that season.

After winning the 1989 FA Cup, Liverpool were denied a second "double" in four seasons when they lost the League title to Arsenal on 26 May 1989. Michael Thomas scored a crucial last minute goal for Arsenal at Anfield that gave the North Londoners a 2–0 win. This resulted in Arsenal winning the league title on goals scored after the two teams had finished the season with the same number of points and exactly the same goal difference.

Hansen made more appearances the following season but his persistent knee problems continued to affect his fitness although he still captained Liverpool to another League title, which made it eight individually for Hansen, which was a record at the time. The club came close to the "double" yet again, but lost an FA Cup semi-final 4–3 in extra-time to Crystal Palace at Villa Park.

Hansen was unable to play in any competitive games during the 1990–91 season (when Liverpool finished second in the league and were trophyless for only the third time since Hansen's arrival 14 years earlier) and he retired in March 1991, a month after Kenny Dalglish resigned as manager. At this stage Ronnie Moran was caretaker manager until the appointment of Graeme Souness in the permanent position shortly afterwards.

In Hansen's playing career for Liverpool, his winners medals include eight league titles, three European Cups, two FA Cups and four League Cups.

==== Hillsborough disaster ====
On 15 April 1989, the Hillsborough disaster claimed the lives of 94 Liverpool fans (eventually rising to 97). Hansen was selected for the FA Cup semi-final match against Nottingham Forest at Hillsborough, playing the opening six minutes of the match before it was abandoned. Hansen attended 12 funerals and visited the injured in hospital.

In his autobiography, Hansen described the tragedy as "the blackest period of my life". He wrote: "The number of broken hearts was incalculable. The immediate aftermath, when Kenny Dalglish and the players attended the funerals and tried to show support for the grieving families took more out of me emotionally than any other experience I have gone through." On Match of the Day in April 2009, Hansen spoke emotionally about the tragedy. He said: "It was a horrific time, traumatic for everybody. It must never be forgotten." In 2010, Hansen said that each of the funerals that he attended after Hillsborough got harder. "The emotional scars will be there forever," he said.

In an article in The Daily Telegraph, Hansen responded to the Hillsborough Independent Panel report of September 2012, by writing: "I have encountered ignorance about Hillsborough on many occasions, finding myself having to correct the inaccurate version of events. The report explicitly removes the excuse of ignorance for those who misunderstood the tragedy. Each sentence in it reads as a tribute to the honesty, integrity and dignity of the families and is an acknowledgement of everything they have been saying since those first, scurrilous accusations surfaced."

== International career ==
Having previously appeared for the under-23 side, Hansen made his full debut for Scotland on 19 May 1979 in a British Home Championship match against Wales in front of 20,000 spectators at Ninian Park, Cardiff. Scotland manager Jock Stein gave debuts to four Scottish players that day – George Burley, John Wark, Paul Hegarty and Hansen. Hosts Wales won the match 3–0 against a somewhat inexperienced Scottish line-up, with striker John Toshack scoring a hat-trick for Wales.

Hansen's second Scotland cap came the following month on 2 June 1979 in a prestigious Saturday afternoon friendly match at Glasgow's Hampden Park against reigning World Champions Argentina. On the hottest day in Glasgow for 30 years, the 61,000 sun-drenched crowd at Hampden Park saw the South Americans beat Scotland 3–1, with an 18-year-old Diego Maradona scoring his first international goal for Argentina in a virtuoso display of skill and trickery. In an interview in 2007, Hansen said that Maradona was "without a shadow of a doubt the best player I came up against. He was virtually unplayable – even at 18."

Hansen played for Scotland in the 1982 World Cup in Spain. The team failed to progress beyond the qualifying group, having drawn 2–2 with the USSR when Scotland needed a win to progress in the tournament. An accidental collision between Hansen and central defensive partner Willie Miller allowed USSR striker Ramaz Shengelia through to score the Soviets' second goal.

A formidable Scotland central defensive partnership was formed between Willie Miller and Alex McLeish of Aberdeen, who were managed by Alex Ferguson. Ferguson, who took charge of the national team after the sudden death of Jock Stein, dropped Hansen from the squad for the 1986 World Cup in Mexico. Hansen disagreed with the decision, as he felt that his form in the 1985–86 season (when Liverpool had won a league and cup double) was near his best. However, both Ferguson and Stein had felt his attitude towards Scotland was wrong, and Ferguson made his mind up not to take Hansen to the World Cup after Hansen pulled out of a game against England in April 1986, stating he had a knee injury. He had played infrequently for Scotland before the tournament, and had often withdrawn from squads. Hansen won the last of his 26 Scotland caps in February 1987 in a 1–0 home defeat by Republic of Ireland at Hampden Park.

== Management offers ==
Hansen was offered the Huddersfield Town job in 1992, following the sacking of Eoin Hand, but he turned it down. There were strong rumours that Hansen would be approached to take over as manager of Liverpool after his former captain Graeme Souness was sacked by the club in 1994. Hansen ruled himself out by stating that, despite his great affection for the club, he simply was not interested in coaching or management; a position he has maintained ever since Roy Evans got the job. Hansen also turned down an offer in 1995 to manage Manchester City, following the sacking of Brian Horton.

== Media career ==
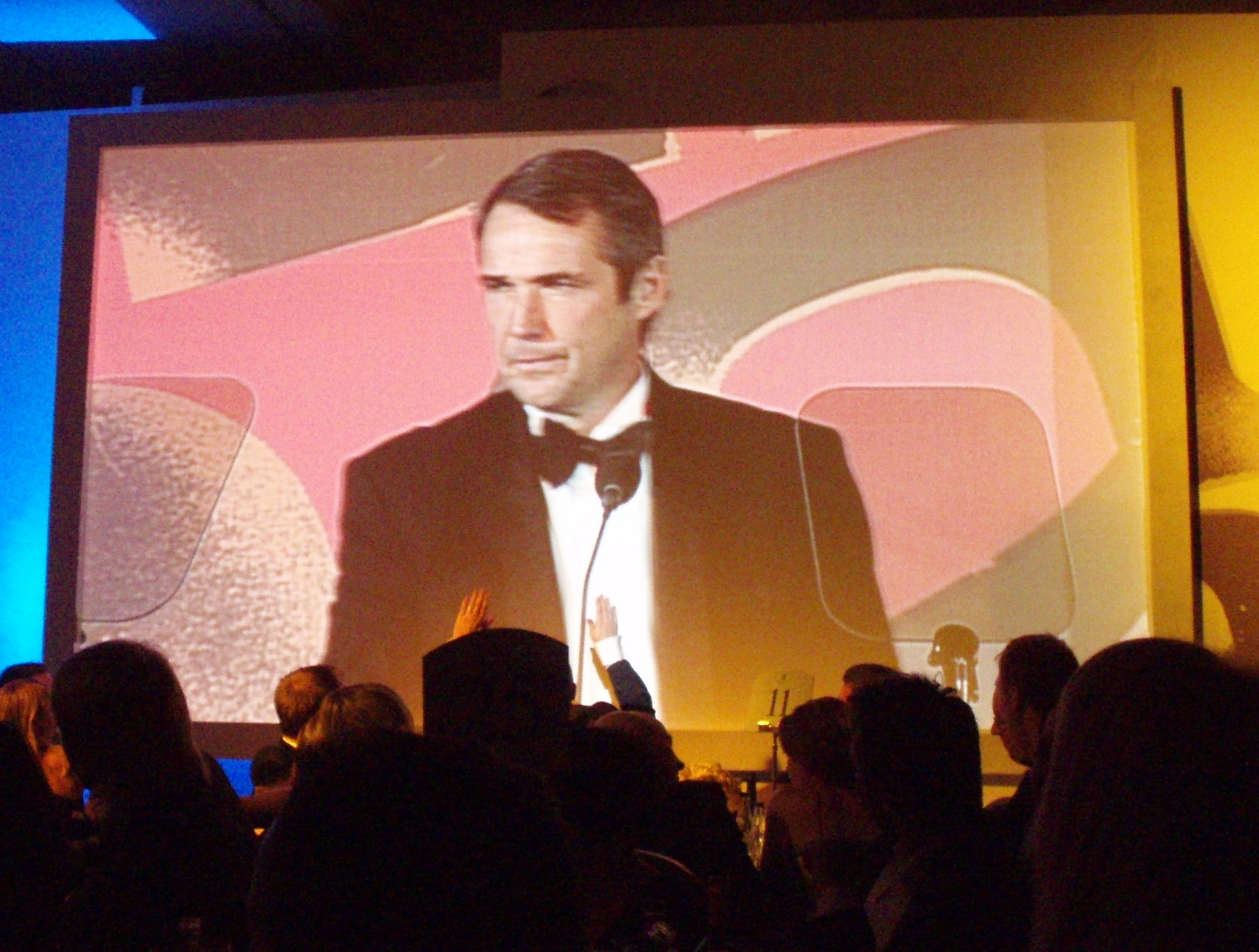
Hansen presenting an award in 2006

After rejecting the idea of management, when he retired from football in 1991 he planned to take three months off. After his wife pointed out that nobody had contacted them during his rest period, he started calling the networks. Sky Television employed Hansen as a pundit and summariser almost as soon as he ceased playing, and soon he had established enough of a reputation as a considered observer and thinker within the game for the BBC to approach him. He began working for BBC Radio 5 Live, before moving on to Match of the Day. Hansen was employed for 22 years as the main pundit for the BBC's football coverage (rights to show matches or highlights permitting) and was known as a calm, authoritative, and rational analyst of the game who is particularly keen on highlighting the triumphs and "shocking", "poor" or "diabolical" mistakes of defenders and commenting on "mediocre" performances. He became a columnist for The Daily Telegraph, Telegraph.co.uk and the BBC Sport website on football issues and has also worked as a motivational speaker.

Hansen is known for coining the phrase "you can't win anything with kids", having made the remark following Manchester United's 3–1 defeat to Aston Villa on the opening day of the 1995–96 FA Premier League season. After selling three high-profile players (Paul Ince, Mark Hughes, and Andrei Kanchelskis) in the summer of 1995, United had introduced youth team players Paul Scholes, David Beckham, Nicky Butt and Gary Neville into the first team. United proved Hansen wrong by winning a Premier League and Cup double that season. Hansen later continued to repeat the phrase for humorous effect and said the phrase "made him" as a pundit, as people would shout it at him in public places.

In May 2013, it was reported that Hansen's BBC contract was due to expire after the 2014 FIFA World Cup. On 5 September 2013, Hansen announced he would retire as a Match of the Day pundit following the 2014 World Cup. His last appearance on Match of the Day itself came on 11 May 2014, the final day of the 2013–14 English league season, with his last appearance as an analyst being for the 2014 FIFA World Cup Final two months later.

Hansen covered sixteen FA Cup Finals, six FIFA World Cups, five UEFA European Championships and one Summer Olympic Games with the BBC.

=== Controversies ===
Commentating on the Argentina–Romania match in the 1994 FIFA World Cup, Hansen said that "the Argentine defender warrants shooting for a mistake like that". The previous day, Colombian defender Andrés Escobar had been shot dead, a killing widely attributed to punishment for an own goal Escobar scored in Colombia's 2–1 loss to the United States earlier in the same tournament. The BBC issued a public apology for Hansen's poor choice of words.

During an appearance on Match of the Day on 21 December 2011, while discussing the prominence of racism in English football following allegations against Premier League players Luis Suárez and John Terry, Hansen twice used the word "coloured" in reference to black footballers. The BBC received 82 complaints by the following morning while some, including Shamrock Rovers player Rohan Ricketts, criticised Hansen's choice of words on social network Twitter. Hansen issued an apology the following day, saying: "I unreservedly apologise for any offence caused – this was never my intention and I deeply regret the use of the word."

== Personal life ==
Hansen lives in Southport with his wife Janet. They have been married since 1980, and have a son, Adam, and a daughter, Lucy.

During the 2014 Scottish independence referendum Hansen was a supporter of the Better Together campaign against Scottish independence.

On 9 June 2024, Liverpool FC issued a press release expressing support for Hansen who was seriously ill in hospital. On 15 June, an on-air message of support was also made by Match of the Day's Alan Shearer and Gary Lineker. Hansen was discharged from hospital on 23 June. A family statement thanked people for their messages of support.

Hansen was appointed Member of the Order of the British Empire (MBE) in the 2025 New Year Honours for services to Association Football and Broadcasting.

On 25 May 2025, Hansen presented the Premier League trophy to Virgil van Dijk in honour of Liverpool's record equalling 20th league title.

== Career statistics ==
=== Club ===
Appearances and goals by club, season and competition
Club	Season	League			National cup (Note: Includes Scottish Cup, FA Cup)		League cup (Note: Includes Scottish League Cup, Football League Cup)		Europe		Other		Total	
Club	Season	Division	Apps	Goals	Apps	Goals	Apps	Goals	Apps	Goals	Apps	Goals	Apps	Goals
Partick Thistle	1973–74	Scottish Division One	1	0					–		–		1	0
Partick Thistle	1974–75	Scottish Division One	29	0					–		–		29	0
Partick Thistle	1975–76	Scottish First Division	21	2					–		–		21	2
Partick Thistle	1976–77	Scottish Premier Division	35	4					–		–		35	4
Partick Thistle	Total		86	6					–		–		86	6
Liverpool	1977–78	First Division	18	0	1	0	3	0	4 (Note: Appearances in European Cup)	1	0	0	26	1
Liverpool	1978–79	First Division	34	1	6	1	0	0	0	0	2 (Note: Appearances in European Super Cup)	0	42	2
Liverpool	1979–80	First Division	38	4	8	0	5	0	1	0	1 (Note: Appearance in FA Charity Shield)	0	53	4
Liverpool	1980–81	First Division	36	1	0	0	8	1	9	1	1	0	54	3
Liverpool	1981–82	First Division	35	0	3	1	8	0	5	1	1 (Note: Appearance in Intercontinental Cup)	0	60	2
Liverpool	1982–83	First Division	34	0	3	0	8	0	6	0	1	0	52	0
Liverpool	1983–84	First Division	42	1	2	0	13	0	9	0	1	0	67	1
Liverpool	1984–85	First Division	41	0	7	0	2	0	9	0	3 (Note: One appearance in FA Charity Shield, one appearance in European Super Cup, one appearance in Intercontinental Cup)	0	62	0
Liverpool	1985–86	First Division	41	0	8	0	7	0	–		4 (Note: Appearances in Football League Super Cup)	0	60	0
Liverpool	1986–87	First Division	39	0	3	0	9	0	–		2 (Note: One appearance in FA Charity Shield, one appearance in Football League Super Cup)	0	53	0
Liverpool	1987–88	First Division	39	1	7	0	3	0	–		0	0	49	1
Liverpool	1988–89	First Division	6	0	2	0	0	0	–		0	0	8	0
Liverpool	1989–90	First Division	31	0	8	0	2	0	–		1	0	42	0
Liverpool	Total		434	8	58	2	68	1	43	3	17	0	620	14
Career total			520	14	58	2	68	1	43	3	17	0	706	20

=== International ===
Appearances and goals by national team and year
National team	Year	Apps	Goals
Scotland	1979	3	0
Scotland	1980	3	0
Scotland	1981	4	0
Scotland	1982	10	0
Scotland	1983	1	0
Scotland	1984	0	0
Scotland	1985	1	0
Scotland	1986	3	0
Scotland	1987	1	0
Total		26	0

== Honours ==
Partick Thistle

- Scottish First Division: 1975–76

Liverpool

- Football League First Division: 1978–79, 1979–80, 1981–82, 1982–83, 1983–84, 1985–86, 1987–88, 1989–90
- FA Cup: 1985–86, 1988–89; runner-up: 1987–88
- Football League Cup: 1980–81,1981–82, 1982–83, 1983–84; runner-up: 1986–87
- FA Charity Shield: 1977 (shared), 1979, 1980, 1982, 1986 (shared), 1989
- Football League Super Cup: 1986
- European Cup: 1977–78, 1980–81, 1983–84
- UEFA Super Cup: 1977

Individual

- PFA Team of the Year: 1981–82 First Division, 1982–83 First Division, 1983–84 First Division, 1986–87 First Division, 1987–88 First Division, 1989–90 First Division
- English Football Hall of Fame: 2006
- Scottish Football Hall of Fame: 2007
- Football League 100 Legends

Awards
Preceded by Martin Brundle	RTS Television Sport Awards; Best Sports Pundit; 2000	Succeeded by John McEnroe
