= Joe Fagan =

English footballer & manager (1921–2001)

Personal information
- Full name: Joseph Francis Fagan
- Date of birth: 12 March 1921
- Place of birth: Walton, Liverpool, England
- Date of death: 30 June 2001 (aged 80)
- Place of death: Liverpool, England
- Position: Right half (Note: The position of wing half is now obsolete in football terminology but it was a key role at the time of Fagan's career when teams routinely played in a 2–3–5 formation. The wing halves (right and left) played outside the centre half in the middle three. Although some wing halves were more creative than defensive, Fagan's job was to win the ball and move it forward, so he was the equivalent of what is called a holding midfielder in 21st century football.)

Senior career*
Years	Team	Apps	(Gls)
1937–1938	Earlestown Bohemians		
1938–1951	Manchester City	158	(2)
1951–1953	Nelson	45	(4)
1953–1954	Bradford Park Avenue	3	(0)
1954–1955	Altrincham	30	(1)
Total		236	(7)

Managerial career
- 1951–1953: Nelson (player-manager)
- 1983–1985: Liverpool
- * Club domestic league appearances and goals

Joseph Francis Fagan (12 March 1921 – 30 June 2001) was an English footballer and manager. He was a coach and manager at Liverpool for twenty seven years under Bill Shankly and Bob Paisley. As a manager he was the first English manager to win three major trophies in a single season and is one of only four English managers to win the European Cup. He played for Manchester City in the Football League First Division as a wing half. As his playing career came to an end, he decided to become a coach and worked at clubs in lower leagues before getting the chance to join Liverpool in 1958.

From December 1959, he worked with Bill Shankly and Bob Paisley and was highly successful in his coaching of the club's reserve team, being mainly responsible for the development of future star players like Roger Hunt, Ian Callaghan and Tommy Smith. After Shankly retired in 1974, Fagan became assistant manager to Paisley and finally manager himself when Paisley retired in 1983. In his first season, Fagan achieved an unprecedented "treble" as Liverpool won the European Cup, the League Championship and the League Cup. He had decided to retire at the end of his second season but his final match in charge was the 1985 European Cup Final which was the scene of the Heysel Stadium disaster, an event that caused him great distress. He was the last English manager to win the European Cup in 1984.

Fagan was an uncomplicated man who believed in the simplicity of football, a devoted family man who preferred to just get on with his job and shun the limelight. He was one of the most respected figures in the game. He and his family lived in the same house not far from Anfield throughout his Liverpool career and afterwards. He died of cancer in 2001, aged eighty.

== Early life ==
Joe Fagan was born in Walton Hospital in Walton, Liverpool, on 12 March 1921 and lived in the Litherland and Scotland Road areas of the city during his childhood and youth. His parents Patrick and Mary were of Irish descent. His father has been recorded as something of a dubious character who was often absent for long periods and Fagan owed a happy childhood to his mother. The proximity of Anfield and Goodison Park meant that football was always a significant part of his life and he developed his ability as a boy. When he was fourteen, he captained his school, St Elizabeth Central, to the Daily Dispatch Trophy, a competition run by the Lancashire Schools Football Association.

After leaving school in 1937, Fagan signed for the St Helens-based Earlestown Bohemians club, known as the "Bohs", who played in the Liverpool County Combination. This was a strong amateur league in which the "A" (third) teams of both Everton and Liverpool competed. Liverpool became interested and he was invited to Anfield for a trial. Manager George Kay offered him a contract but Fagan, then aged seventeen, declined as he thought his first team opportunities at Liverpool would be limited. On 8 October 1938, he signed for Manchester City. Throughout Fagan's playing career, he was a right half, though he could also play at centre half. In the 1938–39 season, Fagan made good progress at City playing for the club's "A" and "B" teams and then getting into the reserves. He was challenging for a first-team place when the Second World War began just as the 1939–40 season was getting under way and the Football League was suspended for the duration of the conflict.

== Second World War ==
As Fagan, then aged eighteen, was not immediately eligible to join the armed forces, City gave him permission to play for Hyde United in the Cheshire County League which was not subject to the same wartime restrictions as the Football League, although it continued for only one season and was suspended in 1940. Fagan and his City teammate Billy Walsh made their debuts for Hyde on 13 October 1939, taking part in a 2–1 victory over Stalybridge Celtic. Fagan played a total of 26 games for Hyde and earned good reviews in the local press. Hyde had a successful season and won the Cheshire League's East Section but lost the two-legged championship playoff against West Section winners Runcorn. Fagan returned to City for the 1940–41 season in which regionalised leagues were tentatively launched. He made his debut for City in the opening North Regional League match, which was a goalless draw at home to Everton and played five matches in all before he became due for military service.

He opted to volunteer rather than wait to be called up as this gave him a choice of services and so he was able to join the Royal Navy. He had never been to sea previously and immediately discovered that he was prone to seasickness. He was sent to Egypt where he worked as a telegraphist with a minesweeping flotilla and remained there until 1946. Many of the men he trained with were posted to the ill-fated HMS Hood and Fagan always counted himself lucky to have missed that posting. He was very interested in boxing and was a useful practitioner during his naval career until he had his nose broken. He played football for various service teams in Alexandria, one of his teams winning a competition called the Chrystall Cup in January 1946, only a few days before he returned to Britain to be demobilised. During periods of leave in England, Fagan had managed to represent City in six regional league matches, including a local derby against Manchester United; and he had also played for Portsmouth.

== Manchester City ==
When league football resumed after the war, Fagan hoped to establish himself as a regular member of the Manchester City side. The team were then in the Football League Second Division. Managed by Wilf Wild, City were promotion favourites, especially as they included notable pre-war players like captain Sam Barkas, goalkeeper Frank Swift and inside forward Alex Herd. They got off to a winning start but in November there was a change of manager and Sam Cowan, City's pre-war captain, took over. Cowan was an innovator keen to make changes and one of these, on 1 January 1947 against Fulham at Maine Road, was to give Joe Fagan his official Manchester City debut more than eight years after he had joined the club. Fagan was then 25 and he played at right-half, making a creditable performance as City won 4–0. He played a key role in City's 1946–47 Second Division Championship-winning team and went on to make 121 consecutive league appearances from debut until November 1949. Tony Matthews recorded views of Fagan's "solid worth" to City in terms of his "positional judgment, strong headwork (sic) and general reliability".

Fagan was, therefore, an established member of the first team when City returned to the First Division in 1947–48 and was an ever-present through that season and the next. He was a popular figure at Maine Road due to his strong team ethic, loyalty to the cause and an ever-ready smile, qualities that were to serve him well in his later coaching and management career. His friend Frank Swift gave him the nickname "Patsy", a reference to the Irish folk song Hallo Patsy Fagan. In a match in November 1947, Fagan met his future colleague Bob Paisley for the first time when they played against each other in City's 2–0 win over Liverpool at Maine Road. City finished tenth that season, one place above Liverpool. In 1948–49, under new manager Jock Thomson, City finished seventh.

In the 1948–49 season, Fagan was again an ever-present as City finished seventh under new manager Jock Thomson. The 1949–50 season was a poor one for City and, with two thirds of the matches played, City had won only five. Thomson was dismissed and, at the end of season, the club were relegated. In 1951, he sustained a broken leg and, aged 30, was forced to consider his future career options. He had played in 138 games for City and scored two goals. He decided to leave City and take up coaching.

Fagan began his coaching career at Nelson in the Lancashire Combination as player-manager, where he led the club to the 1951–52 championship in his first full season in charge. Simultaneously, he worked in a factory checking gas meters for leaks. Nelson applied for re-election to the Football League but were unsuccessful. Fagan moved on and made a brief return to the Football League as a player, making three appearances for Bradford Park Avenue in 1953 and then had a spell playing for Altrincham.

== Rochdale ==
Fagan became assistant manager at Rochdale in 1954, serving under future Everton manager Harry Catterick until 1958. In addition to coaching, he took on numerous other duties at Spotland, such as doing the laundry and marking the pitches.

== Liverpool ==
Following a recommendation by Catterick, Fagan was approached by Liverpool manager Phil Taylor about a coaching role and he accepted. The family moved into a house near Anfield where they remained for the rest of Fagan's life.

=== Reserve team coach (1958 to 1971) ===
Bill Shankly joined Liverpool as manager in December 1959. Upon arriving at Anfield, Shankly was delighted to find Fagan on the coaching staff because, when manager of Grimsby Town in the early 1950s, he had tried to sign Fagan as a player. Shankly's first words to Fagan at Anfield were: "You must have been a good player, Joe, because I tried to sign you". On his first day in charge, Shankly held a meeting with the coaching staff which consisted of Bob Paisley, Reuben Bennett and Fagan to tell them that he was not bringing in his own coaches. He wanted to work with them and so guaranteed them their jobs – Fagan was confirmed as reserve team coach. Shankly pointed out that he would decide the training strategy and they must all work together with absolute loyalty to each other and to the club. Under Phil Taylor, training had been the traditional slog of physical exercise and road running. Shankly insisted on training which was "based on speed and using the ball" with everything done on grass. Five-a-side games were introduced as a key part of the strategy. Fagan had been keen on training with the ball at Nelson and was, like Paisley and Bennett, delighted to implement Shankly's methods.

Training strategy was key to Liverpool's success in the 1960s and afterwards. There was more to it than using the ball and playing five-a-side matches. Influenced by Paisley, Fagan and Bennett, Shankly cottoned on to the importance of allowing players to cool down after training before having a bath or shower. Paisley, as a trained physiotherapist, argued that a person needs to cool down for about 40 minutes after heavy exercise because, if they go into a bath while still sweating, their pores remain open and they are more susceptible to chills and strains. Fagan had advocated getting changed at Anfield before going via team bus to the club's training complex at Melwood. They would return to bathe, change and eat. This routine satisfied the need for a cooling-down period and had the added advantages of encouraging team bonding during the two journeys and ensuring familiarity with Anfield, an important need for them as home team. Everton, by contrast, did everything at their Bellefield training complex and their players only went to Goodison Park for home matches every two weeks or so. Shankly claimed that the cooling-down period resulted in "an astonishing lack of injuries over many seasons". For example, in 1965–66, when Liverpool won the league title and reached the European Cup Winners' Cup final, they only used 14 players in the entire season.

As coach of Liverpool's reserve team, Fagan helped nurture the talents of youngsters like Roger Hunt, Ian Callaghan and Tommy Smith. During Shankly's time as manager, the role of reserve team coach became one of the most critical jobs at Anfield as a key part of Shankly's strategy was to transform the reserves into "a kindergarten for future stars". Though using irony, Shankly emphasised this when he famously said that "the city of Liverpool is blessed with not one, but two great football teams – Liverpool and Liverpool reserves".

=== The "Boot Room" ===
Fagan is credited with converting a storage area at Anfield into a "common room" for the coaches and it became the now-legendary Boot Room. Shankly held daily meetings in there with Fagan, Paisley and Bennett to discuss strategy, tactics, training and players.

=== First team coach (1971 to 1979) ===
In 1971, Fagan was promoted to work as a coach with the first team. Bill Shankly retired in the summer of 1974 and was succeeded by Bob Paisley. Fagan continued to work as first team coach.

=== Assistant manager (1979 to 1983) ===
In 1979, Fagan became Paisley's assistant manager. Quiet and unassuming, he was renowned throughout football for his ability as a coach and Bobby Robson once rated him the best in the game, when interviewed during the early eighties.

=== Appointment as Liverpool manager ===
To Kopites, Fagan's appointment [as manager] felt like an obvious promotion after the successful in-house succession from Shankly to Paisley. In Papal terms, white smoke from the chimneys on the roofs of Back Rockfield Road filled the Anfield skies in no time once Paisley's decision to retire was known.

— Writer Mike Nevin.

After Paisley retired, Fagan was appointed as manager on 1 July 1983, despite his initial reluctance to take on the role. Ian Rush confirmed Fagan's reluctance but said the same had been true of Paisley on his appointment in 1974. Club policy was, as Rush put it,

"to appoint from within and ensure continuity, but only if the right man for the job was already on the staff".

Paisley had told the board that Fagan was the right man because he knew the players and the game, though he admitted that Fagan had never shown any ambition to take on the role.

=== 1983–84 season ===
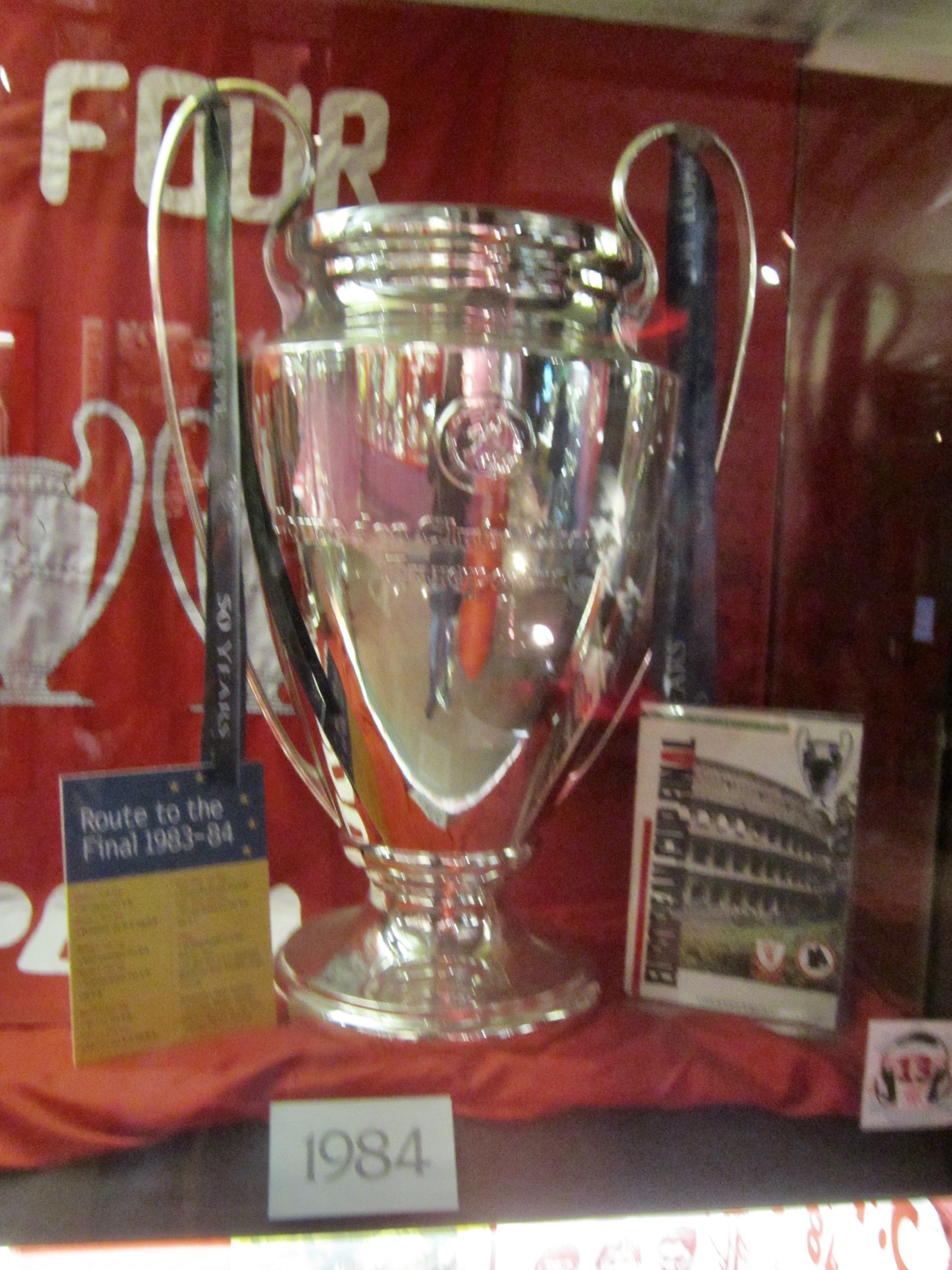
The 1984 European Cup in the Liverpool F.C. museum, part of a treble won by Fagan

In the 1983–84 season, Fagan's first as Liverpool manager, the team won the European Cup, the League Championship and the League Cup and so Fagan was the first manager of an English club to win a treble, three major trophies in a single season. He had quickly expanded his squad with the signings of Michael Robinson and Gary Gillespie. According to defender Mark Lawrenson:

"Souey was a big fan of Joe's. That pre-season he called a meeting just for the players. He came in and said: 'Right, we think the world of this fella and this year we are absolutely determined to be successful for him.' To a man everyone said: 'Yep, you're right.'"

Fagan's first game in charge ended in defeat, at the hands of Manchester United in the FA Charity Shield, but the first silverware was received following victory over Everton in the League Cup final replay at Maine Road. The Championship was secured with a game to spare. In the European Cup, the club won every away game up to the final, including a 4–1 victory at Benfica, with Liverpool then winning a penalty shoot-out against A.S. Roma in Rome, which featured the famous "jelly legs" of goalkeeper Bruce Grobbelaar, to clinch the club's fourth European Cup. Fagan won the Manager of the Year award.

=== 1984–85 season ===
Soon afterwards, Liverpool's captain Graeme Souness left the club for Sampdoria. With the loss of their captain, a player The Guardian described as "the driving force of an all conquering side", who would not be replaced until the signing of Steve McMahon a season later, and with a drop in form of the now 33-year-old Kenny Dalglish and the absence of Rush out injured until October, repeating the success of the 1983–84 season was always going to be difficult. Fagan signed Danish midfielder Jan Mølby, John Wark, Paul Walsh and Kevin MacDonald.

Having made a slow start, Liverpool finished second behind Everton in the 1984–85 season but reached the European Cup final again. They were also beaten in an FA Cup semi-final replay by eventual winners Manchester United, meaning that they had been in contention for three major trophies that season, but ultimately would not win a major trophy; the first time in a decade that they had finished a season without silverware.

=== Retirement announced ===
On 29 May 1985, Fagan announced he would retire and was succeeded by Kenny Dalglish (who would continue as player-coach). In Dalglish's autobiography, he claims that Fagan was left a haunted man for the rest of his life after witnessing the Heysel Stadium disaster. His grandson Andrew Fagan, co-author of Joe Fagan: Reluctant Champion, said: "He lived with it all his life. He had served in the Royal Navy during the war, he understood what was a game and what was not. From what I am told he never really talked about it at home, he simply carried it with him."

Never one to court the limelight, Fagan stepped back into anonymity following his retirement but continued to visit both Anfield and Melwood on a regular basis and was always on hand with words of advice for his successors. Offering encouragement to Roy Evans after he took the Liverpool manager's job in the mid-1990s, Evans described Fagan in his time at the club as the "glue that held everything together".

== Personality ==
Stephen F. Kelly, in Shankly's biography, describes Fagan as "a rubber-faced character, as Liverpudlian as the Liver Bird... the psychologist, the genial scouser, full of Liverpool humour and always grinning". He praised Fagan's man management as he "knew when to kick backsides or when to put an arm around a player". Ronnie Moran remembered Fagan as "what the bootroom was all about" and he "never met a nicer, more straightforward fellow" because Fagan was "never interested in the fancy side of football and never looked for the glamour or the glory".

== Personal life ==
Fagan met his future wife Lillian (Lil) Poke soon after he joined Manchester City in October 1938 and they were married two years later, during the war, before he joined the Navy. Their first child was born in June 1945 while he was stationed in Egypt and in all he and Lil raised six children together, five sons and a daughter. Throughout his time at Liverpool and until his death the family lived in the same modest house, 42 Lynholme Road, just a short walk away from Anfield stadium.

Fagan died of cancer on 30 June 2001, aged 80. His wife Lil outlived Joe by nearly a decade, dying on 4 October 2010 at the age of 92 in a Lincolnshire nursing home.

== Managerial statistics ==
Team	From	To	G	W	D	L	Win%
Liverpool	1 July 1983	29 May 1985	131	71	36	24	54.2

== Honours ==
=== As a player ===
Manchester City

- Football League Second Division promotion: 1946–47

=== As a manager ===
Liverpool

- Football League First Division: 1983–84
- Football League Cup: 1983–84
- European Cup: 1983–84; runner-up: 1984–85

Individual

- English Manager of the Year: 1983–84

== See also ==
- List of European Cup and UEFA Champions League winning managers
- List of English football championship winning managers
