= Chris Pile (footballer) =

English footballer

Christopher James Pile
Personal information
- Date of birth: 4 April 1967 (age 59)
- Place of birth: Huyton, England
- Position: Goalkeeper

Youth career
- Liverpool

Senior career*
Years	Team	Apps	(Gls)
1983–1987	Liverpool	0	(0)
1986–1987	Kirkby Town	0	(0)
1987	Tranmere Rovers	0	(0)
1987	Bury	0	(0)
1988–1991	Waterside Karori	54	(0)
1991–1992	Southport	11	(0)
2001	Western Suburbs	21	(0)
- * Club domestic league appearances and goals

Christopher James Pile (born 4 April 1967) is an English former footballer whose career was curtailed by injury.

A goalkeeper, Pile never actually made a professional appearance, and in fact only made the bench for one senior game. Uniquely, however, this game was the 1985 European Cup Final, which saw him become the youngest footballer to be involved in this fixture, generally considered to be the biggest in club football.

Pile came through the Liverpool youth system, and signed professional forms in 1984 at the age of 17. Initially fourth-choice 'keeper, injuries to Bob Wardle and then Bob Bolder elevated Pile to second place (behind Bruce Grobbelaar) and saw him facing a possible European Cup winner's medal having just turned 18. Pile was indeed named on the bench for the final, but Liverpool lost to Juventus in a game overshadowed by the Heysel Disaster.

He joined Tranmere Rovers and then Bury as a non-contract player, playing reserve team football and impressed sufficiently at Bury to be offered a contract. Unfortunately, though, the deal was scuppered when he broke his wrist on the day of signing. Needing regular football, he accepted an offer to move to New Zealand, a move that he initially expected to be short-term. However, he settled so well, playing for Wellington side Waterside Karori, that he was able to ignore reported interest from Scottish giants Celtic. A couple of years later, personal reasons saw him return to England, and he joined Southport, where he had some success until he suffered a broken hand, the third of his career. This caused him to quit playing, and he returned to New Zealand where he has remained to this day. Chris is one of New Zealand's top goalkeeper coaches working over the past 20 plus years with New Zealand Under 17s & 20s, two spells with Wellington Phoenix in the Australia A-League, Team Wellington in the New Zealand National League and a number of clubs in Wellington. Chris finished his goalkeeper coaching career at Waterside Karori where he started his playing career in New Zealand.

Chris works as an expert analyst in the Australian A-League & English Premier League, and on-air on both Australian and New Zealand Radio stations.
