= Gary Gillespie =

Scottish footballer

Personal information
- Full name: Gary Thompson Gillespie
- Date of birth: 5 July 1960 (age 66)
- Place of birth: Stirling, Scotland
- Height: 6 ft 1 in (1.85 m)
- Position: Centre-back

Senior career*
Years	Team	Apps	(Gls)
1977–1978	Falkirk	22	(0)
1978–1983	Coventry City	172	(6)
1983–1991	Liverpool	156	(14)
1991–1994	Celtic	69	(2)
1994–1997	Coventry City	3	(0)
Total		422	(22)

International career
1978–1982	Scotland Under-21	8	(1)
1987–1990	Scotland	13	(0)
- * Club domestic league appearances and goals

Gary Thompson Gillespie (born 5 July 1960) is a Scottish former professional football centre-back who played for Falkirk, Coventry City, Liverpool, Celtic and the Scotland national team.

== Career ==
=== Falkirk ===
Gillespie started his career with Falkirk, and captained them at 17 years of age which set a Scottish record.

=== Coventry City ===
Coventry City signed Gillespie in 1978 for an initial transfer fee of £40,000, rising to £75,000 on appearances.

=== Liverpool ===
Gillespie signed for Liverpool in 1983. In the 1985 European Cup final against Juventus, he conceded a controversial penalty in the 56th minute, when Michel Platini played Zbigniew Boniek through on goal, and referee André Daina judged Gillespie to have fouled him inside the penalty area, although replays later demonstrated that the foul was actually committed nearly a yard outside the area and the referee was far from the action; Platini scored the ensuing penalty, which proved to be the only goal of the match, although Juventus's victory over Liverpool was overshadowed by the Heysel Stadium disaster.

His three goals in that double winning season all came in the same game. Hat-tricks are rare for defenders, but Gillespie managed one against Birmingham City on 26 April 1986 at Anfield when he scored twice from open play and completed the threesome with a penalty, after the Liverpool fans chanted his name when it was awarded – normally he would not have taken it. Liverpool won the game 5–0 against an already relegated side, as they moved closer to the title, which was sealed on the final day of the season with a 1–0 win at Chelsea.

By 1988, when he partnered Alan Hansen in all but five of Liverpool's games in the league, the Anfield club were a cut above every other side, losing just twice and coasting to the title. In April 1989, Gillespie joined his teammates in mourning the deaths of Liverpool fans at the Hillsborough disaster, during a year in which he again was a regular feature in the team. This time fortunes were reversed – Liverpool won the FA Cup with an emotional victory over Merseyside rivals Everton, but lost the League title to Arsenal with almost the last kick of the season. Gillespie missed that game, however.

In 1990–91, with the absence and eventual retirement of Hansen due to injury, Gillespie was once again a regular in the centre of the Liverpool defence. He played 30 league games and scored once, remaining a regular player after the resignation of Kenny Dalglish in February 1991 and the arrival of Graeme Souness as manager.

=== Celtic ===
Following the arrival of Mark Wright at Liverpool during the close season, Gillespie was transferred to Scottish club Celtic for £925,000 on 15 August 1991. He was among manager Liam Brady's first signings for the Parkhead club, who were being left behind by local rivals Rangers who had been champions for the previous three seasons.

Gillespie scored a goal on his debut for Celtic on 17 August 1991, in a 4–1 league win over his former side Falkirk at Parkhead. He made 69 league appearances for Celtic over three years, scoring twice, but was unable to win any silverware.

=== Return to Coventry City and retirement ===
Soon after the appointment of Tommy Burns as Celtic manager in 1994, it became apparent that Gillespie was not part of the new manager's plans. On 23 August 1994 he returned to Coventry City on a free transfer, making three Premier League appearances during the 1994–95 season. However, he played just three FA Premier League games before a knee injury struck him down, and he finally retired from playing in 1997 after more than two years out of action.

=== International ===
Gillespie won 13 caps for Scotland. Andy Roxburgh gave him his debut on 14 October 1987 in the 2–0 UEFA European Championship qualifier victory over Belgium at Hampden Park. He was selected for the squad that went to the 1990 FIFA World Cup in Italy, but his only appearance came on 20 June against Brazil at the Stadio delle Alpi Turin, a game the Scots lost 1–0. They failed to progress past the group stages.

== Honours ==
Liverpool

- Football League First Division: 1985–86, 1987–88, 1989–90
- FA Cup: 1985–86; runner-up: 1987–88
- FA Charity Shield: 1986 (shared), 1988, 1990
- Football League Super Cup: 1986
- European Cup: 1983–84
- Football League Cup runner-up: 1986–87

Individual

- PFA Team of the Year: 1987–88 First Division
