= André Daina =

Swiss football referee (born 1940)

- Born: 8 July 1940 (age 86); Esclepens, Switzerland

Domestic
Years	League	Role
1974–1986	Swiss Nationalliga A	Referee

International
Years	League	Role
1976–1986	FIFA-listed	Referee

André Daina (born 8 July 1940) is a retired Swiss football referee. He is known for having refereed one match in the 1986 FIFA World Cup in Mexico. He also refereed one match in the 1984 UEFA European Football Championship in France. He refereed a European Cup semi-final leg in 1984 and the European Cup final in 1985, between defending champions Liverpool and Juventus. The latter match was overshadowed by the Heysel Stadium disaster; however, Daina is also remembered for awarding a controversial penalty to Juventus while he was far away from the play, when in the 56th minute, Michel Platini played Zbigniew Boniek through on goal, and the latter was fouled by Gary Gillespie just outside the penalty area. Platini scored the ensuing penalty, which proved to be the only goal of the match.

== Major matches refereed ==
Date	Match	Tournament	Venue	Result	Ref
29 May 1985	Liverpool vs. Juventus	1985 European Cup final	Heysel Stadium, City of Brussels	0–1	

Preceded by European Cup Final 1984 (Sweden) Erik Fredriksson	European Cup Referees; Final 1985 (Switzerland) André Daina	Succeeded by European Cup Final 1986 (France) Michel Vautrot
