= Massimo Briaschi =

Italian footballer

Personal information
- Full name: Massimo Briaschi
- Date of birth: 12 May 1958 (age 68)
- Place of birth: Lugo di Vicenza, Italy
- Height: 1.76 m (5 ft 9 1/2 in)
- Position: Forward

Youth career
- Vicenza

Senior career*
Years	Team	Apps	(Gls)
1975–1979	Vicenza	30	(1)
1979–1980	Cagliari	7	(1)
1980–1981	Vicenza	40	(11)
1981–1984	Genoa	80	(29)
1984–1987	Juventus	71	(17)
1987–1989	Genoa	42	(5)
1989–1990	Prato	18	(0)
1990	North York Rockets	16	(5)
Total		304	(69)

International career
1978–1979	Italy under-21	4	(0)
- * Club domestic league appearances and goals

Massimo Briaschi (born 12 May 1958) is a former Italian professional footballer and FIFA sports agent. Throughout his career he played as a forward. A hard-working and versatile player, he was capable of playing both as a striker and on the wing. He is mostly remembered for his time with Juventus, where he won several honours. His younger brother, Alberto, was also a footballer.

== Club career ==
Briaschi made his professional debut with Vicenza during the 1975–76 season, making 4 appearances in 2 seasons with the club. He was a part of the so-called "Real Vicenza" side, which won the Serie B title during the 1976–77 season, and subsequently finished second in Serie A during the 1977–78 season, playing alongside Paolo Rossi. The following season he found more space and made his UEFA Cup debut. After an unproductive season on loan at Cagliari during the 1979–80 season, he returned to Vicenza for a season, scoring 11 goals in Serie B, which were however unable to help the club avoid relegation. In 1981, he subsequently moved to Serie A side Genoa for three seasons, scoring 29 goals, including 8 during his first season, and 12 during the 1983–84 Serie A season.

Briaschi moved to Juventus during the 1984–85 season, joining his former Vicenza team-mate Rossi, where they attacking duo were supported by Michel Platini in the playmaking role. Briashi scored 12 goals during his first season with the club, and won the UEFA Super Cup in 1984, and was part of Juventus' European Cup victory in 1985, scoring goals against Grasshopper, Sparta Prague, and Bordeaux, in the semi-final, where he also sustained an injury. The following season, he found less space, although he was able to win the 1985–86 Serie A title with the club, also winning the 1985 Intercontinental Cup. His chances were even more limited during his third season in Turin, and he eventually returned to Genoa in 1987.

After two seasons in Serie B, in December 1989 he moved to Serie C1 side Prato, ending his Italian career in 1990. He spent the 1990 season with North York Rockets in the Canadian Soccer League.

== International career ==
Although he was never capped for Italy at senior level, Briaschi represented the Italy national under-21 football team on 4 occasions between 1978 and 1979. He also took part with Italy at the 1984 Summer Olympics, where the team finished in fourth place after reaching the semi-finals.

== Honours ==
Vicenza

- Serie B: 1976–77
- Coppa Italia Serie C: 1981–82

Juventus

- Serie A: 1985–86
- UEFA Super Cup: 1984
- European Cup: 1984–85
- Intercontinental Cup: 1985
