= Beniamino Vignola =

Italian footballer and entrepreneur (born 1959)

Personal information
- Date of birth: 12 June 1959 (age 67)
- Place of birth: Verona, Italy
- Height: 1.72 m (5 ft 7 1/2 in)
- Position: Midfielder

Youth career
- 1975–1978: Verona

Senior career*
Years	Team	Apps	(Gls)
1978–1980	Verona	43	(2)
1980–1983	Avellino	88	(16)
1983–1985	Juventus	52	(6)
1985–1986	Verona	19	(2)
1986–1988	Juventus	28	(1)
1988–1990	Empoli	68	(12)
1991–1992	Mantova	28	(5)
Total		326	(44)

International career
1984	Italy U-21	5	(2)
- * Club domestic league appearances and goals

Beniamino Vignola (born 12 June 1959) is an Italian former footballer and entrepreneur, who played as a midfielder. He notably played for Juventus and was part of their European Cup victory in 1985. A small, quick, mobile, agile, and creative player, with excellent technical ability and a slender physique, he usually played as a central or attacking midfielder; considered a promising talent, he was compared to Gianni Rivera as a youngster.

== Club career ==
Vignola began his career with Hellas Verona, making his Serie A debut in 1978. In 1980, he moved to Avellino, where he remained for three seasons, wearing the number 10 shirt.

He was acquired by Juventus in 1983 for 4.8 billion Lire, as a back-up to Michel Platini, remaining at the club until 1988. Despite initially featuring mainly as a substitute, he later became a member of the starting line-up, and he helped Juventus to win the Serie A title and the European Cup Winners' Cup during the 1983–84 season. He scored two goals against Udinese that season and also scored and set-up Boniek's match-winning goal in the 1984 European Cup Winners' Cup Final, as Juventus beat Porto 2–1 in Basel. The following season, he won the 1984 European Super Cup with Juventus, and he was part of their European Cup victory in 1985.

In 1988, he moved to Empoli in Serie B, where he was unable to prevent the club from being relegated to Serie C1 during the 1988–89 season. He ended his career in 1992, playing in Serie C2 with Mantova. He would later become the team's sporting director during the 1993–94 season. After the team went bankrupt, he became a player-manager with an amateur side in Verona called San Martino Buon Albergo, and he soon retired from football.

== International career ==
Vignola represented the Italy under-21 side on 5 occasions, scoring 2 goals. He played for the Italy at the 1984 Summer Olympics in Los Angeles, where the Italians reached the semi-finals, finishing the tournament in fourth place. He never appeared for the Italian senior side.

== Honours ==
Juventus

- Serie A: 1983–84
- European Cup: 1984–85
- European Cup Winners' Cup: 1983–84
- European Super Cup: 1984
