= Cesare Prandelli =

Italian association football player and manager (born 1957)

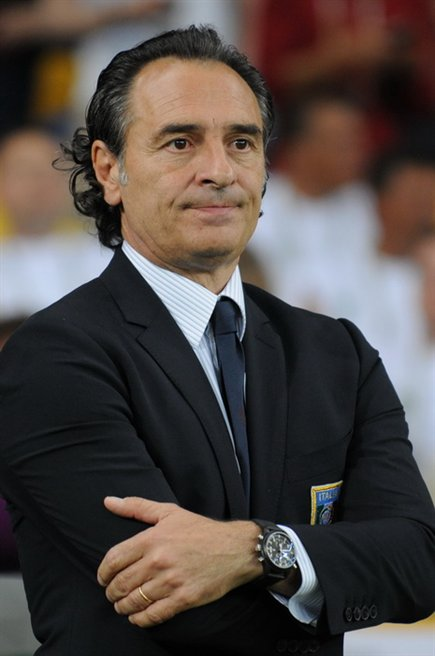
- Prandelli managing Italy in 2012

Personal information
- Full name: Claudio Cesare Prandelli
- Date of birth: 19 August 1957 (age 69)
- Place of birth: Orzinuovi, Italy
- Height: 1.76 m (5 ft 9 in)
- Position: Midfielder

Senior career*
Years	Team	Apps	(Gls)
1974–1978	Cremonese	88	(7)
1978–1979	Atalanta	27	(3)
1979–1985	Juventus	89	(0)
1985–1990	Atalanta	119	(7)
Total		323	(17)

Managerial career
- 1993–1994: Atalanta (caretaker)
- 1997–1998: Lecce
- 1998–2000: Verona
- 2000–2001: Venezia
- 2002–2004: Parma
- 2004: Roma
- 2005–2010: Fiorentina
- 2010–2014: Italy
- 2014: Galatasaray
- 2016: Valencia
- 2017–2018: Al-Nasr
- 2018–2019: Genoa
- 2020–2021: Fiorentina
Medal record
Men's football
Representing Italy (as manager)
UEFA European Championship
Runner-up	2012
FIFA Confederations Cup
Bronze medal – third place	2013
- * Club domestic league appearances and goals

Claudio Cesare Prandelli (Italian pronunciation: [ˈtʃeːzare pranˈdɛlli, ˈtʃɛː-]; born 19 August 1957) is an Italian former football coach and former player.

== Playing career ==
Prandelli was a midfielder who moved from Atalanta to Juventus in 1979. His first game for Juventus was in the 1979–80 European Cup Winners' Cup against Raba ETO Győr. He played six seasons with Juventus, with his final game in the 1984–85 Coppa Italia against Milan.

In total, Prandelli played in 197 Serie A matches.

== Managerial career ==
=== Early years as club coach ===
Prandelli began his managing career as youth team coach for Atalanta, achieving excellent results from 1990 to 1997, save for a seven-months parenthesis – from November 1993 to June 1994 – in which he served as caretaker for the first team, then relegated to Serie B. After a poor 1997–98 Serie A campaign as Lecce head coach ended in a sacking in January 1998, Prandelli headed Hellas Verona for two seasons, leading the gialloblu to an immediate promotion to Serie A, and then to a solid ninth-place finish the next year. He later spent two years with Parma.

Starting the 2004–05 season for Roma, he left the team because of personal problems involving his wife, with her being seriously ill.

=== Fiorentina ===
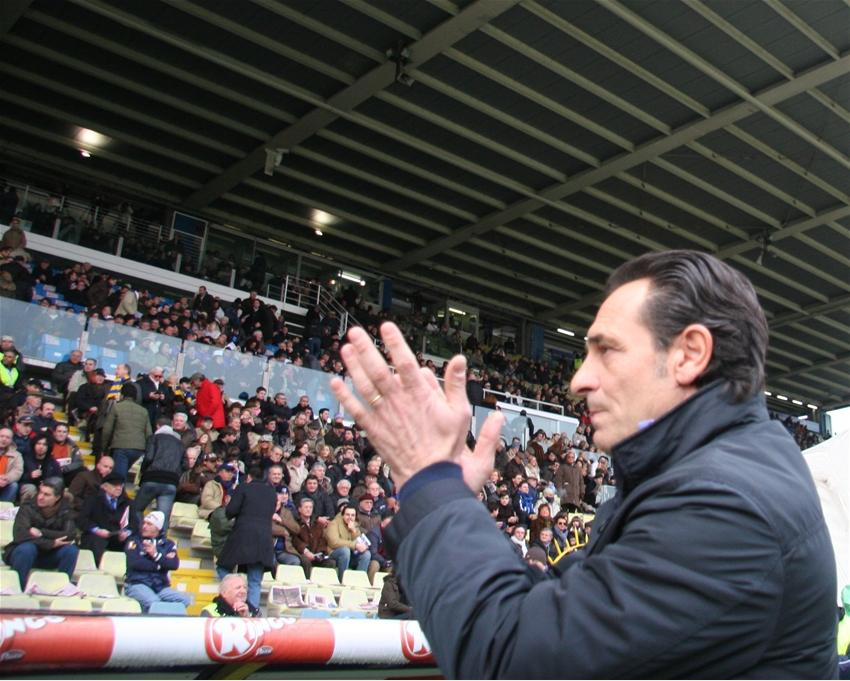
Prandelli greeting Fiorentina supporters in 2008

Prandelli joined Fiorentina as manager in the summer of 2005. His first season in Tuscany proved to be a huge success, as Prandelli transformed Fiorentina from relegation strugglers into a team worthy of a UEFA Champions League spot, finishing the season in fourth place. Unfortunately for Fiorentina and Prandelli, however, as a result of the Calciopoli match-fixing scandal, Fiorentina was stripped of its Champions League spot and started the 2006–07 season in Serie A with a 15-point deduction.

The next year, despite the points deduction, Prandelli was able to guide Fiorentina to a sixth-place finish in Serie A (with the same point tally as fifth placed Palermo), securing UEFA Cup qualification for the 2007–08 season. The team performed well in the competition, losing in a penalty shootout against Rangers in the semi-final. In Serie A, the team finished fourth after winning a long race against Milan, earning a ticket to participate in the 2008–09 Champions League following a season in which his wife died.

For his work in the 2007–08 season, Prandelli was awarded the Serie A Coach of the Year at the "Oscar del calcio" awards in early 2009. He later managed to get Fiorentina into the group phase after defeating Slavia Prague in the third qualifying round, and also guided Fiorentina to another fourth place spot, this time just pipping Genoa (who ended the season with the same points as Fiorentina, but were classified at fifth due to head-to-head results) and a second consecutive participation in the Champions League qualifying rounds. After the departure of Milan manager Carlo Ancelotti, Prandelli's tenure as Fiorentina became the longest of all incumbent Serie A managers.

In 2009, Prandelli surpassed Fulvio Bernardini as the longest-serving manager in Fiorentina history, and guided the viola to a historic qualification in the round of 16 of the 2009–10 Champions League, where it was eliminated by Bayern Munich (which later went on to reach the final) through the away goals rule. Prandelli, however, did not manage to repeat such successes at the domestic stage, with things being made even more complex by his key player Adrian Mutu being suspended due to doping-related issues. Fiorentina ended the 2009–10 Serie A in 11th position, far removed from the top sides in the league.

=== Italy national team ===
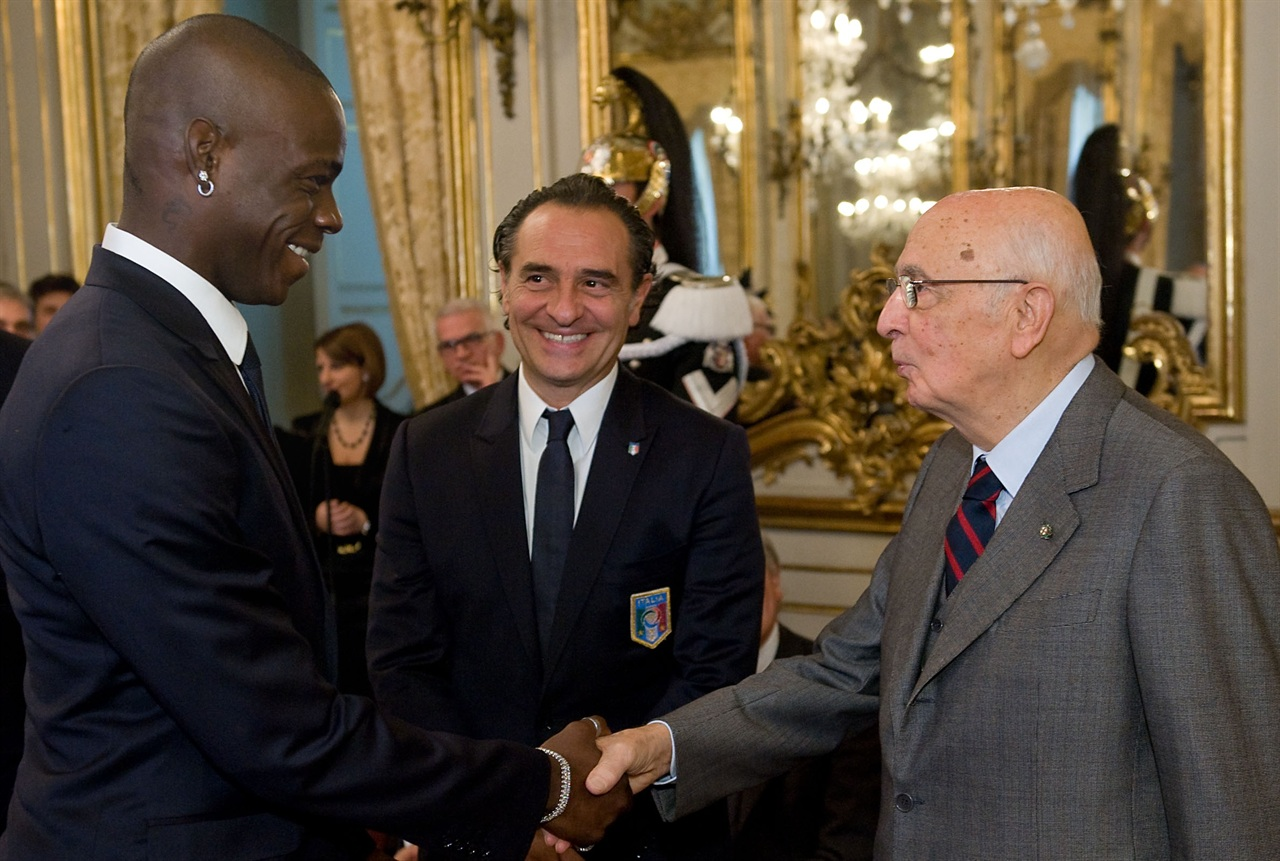
Mario Balotelli (left) and Cesare Prandelli (centre) meeting the then Italian President Giorgio Napolitano (right) in November 2011

On 20 May 2010, Fiorentina confirmed that Prandelli was given permission to hold talks with Italian Football Federation (FIGC) president Giancarlo Abete to replace Marcello Lippi as head coach of the Italy national team after the 2010 FIFA World Cup. On 30 May, the FIGC publicly announced that Prandelli will take over from Lippi at the head of the Azzurri after the World Cup. His official debut arrived on 10 August 2010 in a friendly match against the Ivory Coast at the Boleyn Ground, London, finishing in a 0–1 defeat.

Then, during the UEFA Euro 2012 qualifiers, Italy came back from behind to defeat Estonia 2–1. Italy's match against Serbia was plagued by crowd trouble and UEFA subsequently awarded Italy a 3–0 victory, putting them in pole position of their group. On 25 March 2011, Italy recorded a 1–0 win over Slovenia to secure top spot in the qualification table. Before the Slovenia game, Prandelli said, "The moment has come for us to have faith in the former greats of our football and learn from them ... My instruction is to work, work, work and I sincerely believe in rebuilding." Although preparations for the Euro 2012 finals in Poland and Ukraine were affected by domestic match-rigging scandals, Prandelli succeeded in restoring honour to the national team after six years of relative famine by unexpectedly guiding it to the final. After coming second in the group stage while adopting a 3–5–2 system (with 1–1 draws against Spain and Croatia and a 2–0 win over the Republic of Ireland), the team switched to a 4–4–2 diamond; following the tactical switch, Italy dominated a goalless encounter against England won by a penalty shootout, and then contrived a striking 2–1 defeat of Germany in which Prandelli's special protégé Mario Balotelli scored twice. Despite losing 4–0 to Spain in the final, Prandelli was able to bring the team back to Italy amid popular applause to receive the personal compliments of President of Italy Giorgio Napolitano at an official reception in the Quirinal Palace.

Under Prandelli, Italy went on to finish third in the 2013 FIFA Confederations Cup in Brazil, beating out Uruguay 3–2 in the penalty shootout after a 2–2 deadlock following extra time in the bronze medal match. Italy had previously lost out 7–6 to Spain on penalties in the semi-finals, after a 0–0 draw. Italy finished second in their group behind eventual champions Brazil, winning their opening two group matches against Mexico and Japan, but losing their final group match 4–2 to the hosts.

After comfortably guiding the Italian team to qualification to the 2014 World Cup, in March 2014 it was revealed Prandelli had agreed a two-year contract extension that would keep him in charge until Euro 2016. Italy won their opening match against England 2–1, but then suffered an unexpected 1–0 defeat to Costa Rica in their following match. On 24 June 2014, Prandelli resigned as Italy manager after a controversial 1–0 defeat against Uruguay in their final group match, which eliminated Italy from the World Cup in the group stage; during the match, Claudio Marchisio was sent off and the referee Marco Antonio Rodríguez failed to see Luis Suárez bite Giorgio Chiellini prior to Uruguay's goal from a corner kick. Following Italy's early elimination from the tournament, the press criticised Italy's gameplay, and Prandelli for over-relying on Andrea Pirlo, and for his inability to manage tensions in the dressing room effectively.

=== Galatasaray ===
On 3 July 2014, Prandelli became the manager of Galatasaray taking over from the previous fellow Italian coach Roberto Mancini, signing a two-year contract. He would only spend 147 days as manager, however, as he was sacked on 28 November 2014. His league performance was certainly not bad: in ten weeks his team managed to get six wins, one draw and three losses, landing at third place in the Süper Lig, one point behind Fenerbahçe and Beşiktaş. The team under Prandelli, however, had one of its worst seasons in the Champions League, with two 4–1 losses to Arsenal, and 4–0 and 4–1 losses to Borussia Dortmund, ending the team with one point and −12 goal difference in six games. Prandelli's statement that "the Turkish league is our priority" was not well received by the fans and the club board, as Galatasaray is often seen as the "European team" of Turkey, being the most successful club in European tournaments. Prandelli's tactics and player choices were also heavily criticized in the media, as he tried different lineups in 16 games that he managed. His successor, Hamza Hamzaoğlu, led the team to both league and cup titles. Players declared their discontent about working with Prandelli several times in the media.

=== Valencia ===
On 28 September 2016, Prandelli was appointed manager of Spanish La Liga club Valencia, replacing Pako Ayestarán. He resigned after only ten games on 30 December 2016.

=== Al-Nasr ===
On 25 May 2017, Prandelli was appointed manager of Emirates Arabian Gulf League club Al-Nasr Dubai.

=== Genoa ===
On 7 December 2018, Prandelli was appointed as Genoa manager. His contract was terminated on 20 June 2019.

=== Return to Fiorentina ===
On 9 November 2020, Prandelli returned to Fiorentina as manager following the sacking of Giuseppe Iachini. He resigned on 23 March 2021 following a 2–3 home loss to AC Milan, declaring on a public statement his decision to be motivated by personal reasons and a feeling of distress, and also hinting at the fact it might have been his final role as a coach in his career.

== Style of management ==
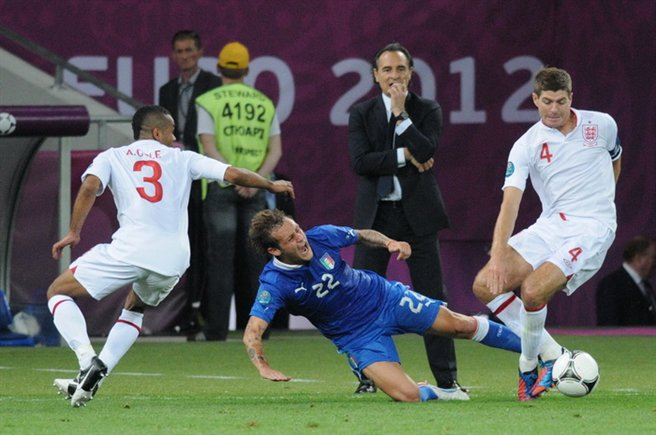
Prandelli managing Italy at UEFA Euro 2012

As manager of Fiorentina, Prandelli made use of a 4–4–2 formation; the team's style of play was based on pace and ball-distribution, rather than physical power, with a centre-forward being supported by a second striker up-front. He also used a more defensive-minded 4–5–1 formation on occasion. In his second spell at the club, he made use of the 4–2–3–1 formation.

During his time as manager of the Italy national football team, Prandelli was known for his offensive tactics and for implementing an attractive playing style based on passing and ball possession, which was likened to Spain's tiki-taka. He also used the 3–5–2 formation on occasion at Euro 2012, with wing-backs and a ball-playing sweeper, before reverting to a stylish attacking system using their 'standard' 4–4–2 diamond formation for the knockout stages. He often deployed deep-lying, defensive, or box-to-box midfielders, such as Riccardo Montolivo, Alberto Aquilani, Marco Verratti, Daniele De Rossi, Antonio Nocerino, or Thiago Motta, seemingly as a number ten behind the forwards, while actually acting as a false attacking midfielder in his 4–3–1–2 formation; as such this formation was devoid of an authentic attacking midfielder, and was centred on the midfielders constantly switching positions. He also used them in other midfield roles on occasion. Prandelli's midfield was focussed on the creative playmaking of Andrea Pirlo and Montolivo in their respective deep-lying playmaker and false attacking midfield roles, with Pirlo seemingly being deployed as a defensive midfielder in front of the defense, in order to be left with more time on the ball, in an "inverted" midfield diamond (4–1–3–2). While Pirlo dictated play with his passing, in a similar manner to Spain's Xavi, he was supported defensively by dynamic box-to-box midfielders, such as Claudio Marchisio and De Rossi, who pressed their opponents, due to his lack of pace or notable defensive ability. The space created by the movement of Montolivo as the false 10 allowed quicker, more offensive minded midfielders, such as Marchisio, to make attacking runs in order to receive Pirlo and Montolivo's long passes from the midfield, whilst the second striker Antonio Cassano would drop out wide onto the wing or into the attacking midfielder position to link up the play between the attack and midfield. As well as functioning as a playmaker, and creating space, in the false 10 role, Montolivo was also able to alleviate the pressure placed upon Pirlo in the deep lying playmaker role, by supporting him defensively and providing Pirlo and the team with a secondary creative option. In Italy's opening match against Spain, Prandelli used defensive midfielder Daniele De Rossi as a ball-playing centre-back in a back-three, due to injuries to his team's starting defenders.

Prandelli also made use of a more organised and defensive 3–4–3 formation against Spain during the 2013 FIFA Confederations Cup semi-final, attempting to stifle Spain's possession game by reducing spaces, and subsequently hitting them on the counter-attack; the system proved to be more effective, as Italy created several opportunities and were only eliminated on penalties following a goalless draw. During Italy's opening match of the 2014 World Cup, a 2–1 win against England, Prandelli also made use of a 4–1–3–1–1 formation with two playmakers in midfield. He has also been known to use the 4–3–3 formation on occasion.

Prandelli was also known for implementing a strict ethical code during his time as Italy manager, excluding players who had been suspended due to violent conduct or poor behaviour.

== Personal life ==
Prandelli is a widower. He was married to Manuela Caffi. They met in his hometown of Orzinuovi when he was 18 and she was 15. They married in 1982, with footballers Antonio Cabrini and Domenico Pezzolla witnessing the event, and they had two children named Carolina and Nicolò. In 2001, Manuela was diagnosed with breast cancer; her worsening health conditions led Prandelli to resign from his coaching post at Roma only days after his signing. After a short recovery, her conditions worsened and she died on 26 November 2007 in Florence. On 29 November, Fiorentina travelled to Athens to play Greek side AEK Athens, with Prandelli's assistant Gabriele Pin deputizing for him. The Fiorentina team attended Prandelli's wife's funeral along with her personal friends. The team was shaken by the turn of events.

Prandelli's son Nicolò has also embarked on an off-pitch football career, having been chosen as a fitness coach by Parma in 2009, and then by the Italy national team during the buildup to the Euro 2012 finals.

Prandelli is a devout Catholic. As of 2010, he has been in a relationship with his partner Novella Benini.

Prandelli has spoken out against homophobia and racism in football; in 2012, he wrote a preface to a book on homosexuality in sport by Alessandro Cecchi Paone and Flavio Pagano which stated, "Homophobia is racism and it is indispensable that we make further steps to look after all aspects of individuals living their own lives, including sporting figures, ... In the world of football and of sport in general there is still a taboo around homosexuality. Everyone ought to live freely with themselves, their desires and their sentiments. We must all work for a sporting culture that respects the individual in every manifestation of his truth and freedom. Hopefully soon some players will come out."

== Managerial statistics ==
As of match played 21 March 2021

Managerial record by team and tenure
Team	Nat	From	To	Record							
Team	Nat	From	To	G	W	D	L	GF	GA	GD	Win %
Atalanta (caretaker)	(Italy)	2 November 1993	2 May 1994	26	3	10	13	22	47	−25	11.54
Lecce	(Italy)	18 June 1997	2 February 1998	24	5	4	15	17	41	−24	20.83
Verona	(Italy)	20 June 1998	20 May 2000	78	30	26	22	107	92	+15	38.46
Venezia	(Italy)	20 May 2000	9 October 2001	53	23	17	13	77	66	+11	43.40
Parma	(Italy)	16 May 2002	28 May 2004	85	38	24	23	138	104	+34	44.71
Roma	(Italy)	28 May 2004	27 August 2004	0	0	0	0	0	0	+0	—
Fiorentina	(Italy)	7 June 2005	3 June 2010	240	117	56	67	357	250	+107	48.75
Italy	(Italy)	2 July 2010	24 June 2014	56	23	20	13	81	58	+23	41.07
Galatasaray	(Turkey)	8 July 2014	28 November 2014	16	6	3	7	15	29	−14	37.50
Valencia	(Spain)	3 October 2016	30 December 2016	10	3	3	4	17	17	+0	30.00
Al-Nasr	(United Arab Emirates)	25 May 2017	19 January 2018	19	8	5	6	30	21	+9	42.11
Genoa	(Italy)	7 December 2018	20 June 2019	24	4	11	9	20	28	−8	16.67
Fiorentina	(Italy)	9 November 2020	23 March 2021	23	6	6	11	27	35	−8	26.09
Total				654	266	185	203	908	788	+120	40.67

== Honours ==
=== Player ===
Cremonese

- Serie C: 1976–77

Juventus

- Serie A: 1980–81, 1981–82, 1983–84
- Coppa Italia: 1982–83
- European Cup: 1984–85
- European Cup Winners' Cup: 1983–84
- European Super Cup: 1984

=== Manager ===
Hellas Verona

- Serie B: 1998–99

Italy

- UEFA European Football Championship Runners-up: 2012
- FIFA Confederations Cup Third Place: 2013

=== Individual ===
- Panchina d'Oro: 2005–06, 2006–07
- Serie A Coach of the Year: 2007–08
- Premio internazionale Giacinto Facchetti: 2009
- Enzo Bearzot Award: 2011
- Fiorentina All-time XI (Manager)
