= Bruno Limido =

Italian footballer (born 1961)

Personal information
- Date of birth: 7 March 1961 (age 65)
- Place of birth: Varese, Italy
- Height: 1.76 m (5 ft 9 in)
- Position: Midfielder

Youth career
- Varese

Senior career*
Years	Team	Apps	(Gls)
1978–1980	Varese	34	(3)
1980–1981	Avellino	9	(0)
1981–1982	Varese	34	(1)
1982–1984	Avellino	53	(5)
1984–1985	Juventus	4	(0)
1985	Atalanta	4	(0)
1985–1986	Bologna	22	(1)
1986–1987	Atalanta	18	(0)
1987–1988	Lecce	32	(1)
1988–1989	Cesena	25	(1)
1989–1990	Solbiatese	23	(0)
1990–1992	Varese	50	(3)
Total		308	(15)
- * Club domestic league appearances and goals

Bruno Limido (born 7 March 1961) is an Italian former footballer who played as a midfielder.
