= Nicola Caricola =

Italian footballer

Personal information
- Date of birth: 13 February 1963 (age 63)
- Place of birth: Bari, Italy
- Position: Defender

Youth career
- Bari

Senior career*
Years	Team	Apps	(Gls)
1981–1983	Bari	70	(2)
1983–1987	Juventus	59	(0)
1987–1994	Genoa	201	(6)
1994	Torino	4	(0)
1994–1995	Genoa	24	(0)
1996	MetroStars	26	(2)

International career
1982–1984	Italy U21	10	(4)
- * Club domestic league appearances and goals

Nicola Caricola (born 13 February 1963) is an Italian former footballer who played as a sweeper.

== Career ==
At club level, Caricola played for Bari, Juventus, Genoa, and Torino in Italy. In 1995, he had an unsuccessful trial with English side Aston Villa. He finished out his career with the New York / New Jersey MetroStars of Major League Soccer, playing with them during the league's inaugural season in 1996. He retired in February 1997.(subscription required)
