= 1987–88 Juventus FC season =

Italian football club season

Juventus
1987–88 season
- Owner: Agnelli family
- Chairman: Giampiero Boniperti
- Manager: Rino Marchesi
- Stadium: Comunale
- Serie A: 6th
- Coppa Italia: Semi-finals
- UEFA Cup: Second Round
- Top goalscorer: League: Rush (7); All: Rush (13)
- Average home league attendance: 33,081
Home colours	Away colours	Third colours
- All statistics correct as of 23 May 1988.

Juventus Football Club finished in 6th place in the 1987–88 Serie A season.

== Overview ==
Following Platini's departure, Juventus tried to find a substitute in Welsh striker Ian Rush. Despite being seasonal top scorer, he disappointed fans' hope about him. Bianconeri passed only a challenge in UEFA Cup, finishing their path in round of 32. Condemned by a slow trend in league Juventus bet his cards on domestic cup, but was defeated by Torino in semifinals. His revenge came anyway after Serie A end, beating granata (on shootout) in a playoff that awarded last UEFA Cup spot.

== Squad ==
Note: Flags indicate national team as defined under FIFA eligibility rules; some limited exceptions apply. Players may hold more than one non-FIFA nationality.

Pos.	Nation	Player
GK	ITA	Stefano Tacconi
GK	ITA	Luciano Bodini
DF	ITA	Pasquale Bruno
DF	ITA	Sergio Brio
DF	ITA	Roberto Tricella
DF	ITA	Antonio Cabrini
DF	ITA	Luigi De Agostini
DF	ITA	Luciano Favero
DF	ITA	Nicolo Napoli

Pos.	Nation	Player
DF	ITA	Gaetano Scirea (captain)
MF	SMR	Massimo Bonini
MF	ITA	Marino Magrin
MF	ITA	Massimo Mauro
MF	ITA	Angelo Alessio
MF	ITA	Beniamino Vignola
FW	DEN	Michael Laudrup
FW	WAL	Ian Rush
FW	ITA	Renato Buso

=== Transfers ===
In
Pos.	Name	from	Type
FW	Ian Rush	Liverpool	
DF	Roberto Tricella	Hellas Verona	
DF	Pasquale Bruno	Como	
MF	Marino Magrin	Atalanta BC	
MF	Angelo Alessio	Avellino	
DF	Nicolo Napoli	ACR Messina	

Out
Pos.	Name	to	Type
MF	Michel Platini		retired
DF	Nicola Caricola	Genoa CFC	
DF	Roberto Soldà	Hellas Verona	
DF	Stefano Pioli	Hellas Verona	
MF	Lionello Manfredonia	AS Roma	
FW	Aldo Serena	Internazionale	
FW	Massimo Briaschi	Genoa CFC	

== Competitions ==
=== Serie A ===
==== League table ====
Pos	Team	Pld	W	D	L	GF	GA	GD	Pts	Qualification or relegation
4	Sampdoria	30	13	11	6	41	30	+11	37	Qualification to Cup Winners' Cup
5	Internazionale	30	11	10	9	42	35	+7	32	Qualification to UEFA Cup
6	Juventus (Note: Juventus won the UEFA Cup qualification match against Torino 0–0*(4:2) then qualified to 1988–89 UEFA Cup.)	30	11	9	10	35	30	+5	31	Qualification to UEFA Cup
7	Torino	30	8	15	7	33	30	+3	31	
8	Fiorentina	30	9	10	11	29	33	−4	28	

Source: 1987–88 Serie A, RSSSF.com
Rules for classification: 1) Points; 2) Head-to-head points; 3) Head-to-head goal difference; 4) Goal difference; 5) Goals scored; 6) Draw.

==== Results by round ====
Round	1	2	3	4	5	6	7	8	9	10	11	12	13	14	15	16	17	18	19	20	21	22	23	24	25	26	27	28	29	30
Ground	H	A	H	A	H	H	A	H	A	H	A	H	A	H	A	A	H	A	H	A	A	H	A	H	A	H	A	H	A	H
Result	W	L	W	L	W	L	W	W	L	W	L	D	D	L	D	D	W	L	D	L	W	L	W	D	D	W	D	W	D	L
Position	5	7	5	9	7	10	7	4	7	5	6	5	5	7	7	7	6	8	8	8	8	8	8	7	7	7	6	5	5	6

Source: Competitive matches
A = Away; H = Home; W = Win; D = Draw; L = Loss; = 1988–89 European Cup; = 1988–89 UEFA Cup

==== Matches ====
13 September 1987 1	Juventus	1–0	Como	Turin
16:00	Magrin 72' (pen.)	Report		Stadium: Stadio Comunale; Referee: Paolo Fabricatore

20 September 1987 2	Empoli	1–0	Juventus	Empoli
16:00	Ekström 56'	Report		Stadium: Stadio Carlo Castellani; Referee: Carlo Longhi

27 September 1987 3	Juventus	3–1	Pescara	Turin
15:00	Rush 44', 59'; Favero 75'	Report	Júnior 81'	Stadium: Stadio Comunale; Referee: Rosario Lo Bello

4 October 1987 4	Verona	2–1	Juventus	Verona
15:00	Elkjær 38' (pen.), 48'	Report	Brio 67'	Stadium: Stadio Marc'Antonio Bentegodi; Referee: Paolo Bergamo

11 October 1987 5	Juventus	1–0	Roma	Turin
15:00	Boniek 42' (o.g.)	Report		Stadium: Stadio Comunale; Referee: Luigi Agnolin

25 October 1987 6	Internazionale	2–1	Juventus	Milan
14:30	Serena 9', 73'	Report	De Agostini 51'	Stadium: Stadio Giuseppe Meazza; Referee: Tullio Lanese

1 November 1987 7	Juventus	3–0	Avellino	Turin
14:30	Colantuono 39' (o.g.); Rush 75'; Alessio 87'	Report		Stadium: Stadio Comunale; Referee: Fabio Baldas

8 November 1987 8	Pisa	1–2	Juventus	Pisa
14:30	Elliott 41'	Report	De Agostini 18'; Elliott 90' (o.g.)	Stadium: Stadio Arena Garibaldi; Referee: Paolo Casarin

22 November 1987 9	Juventus	0 – 2a	Cesena	Turin
14:30	Brio 53', 69'	Report	Rizzitelli 75'	Stadium: Stadio Comunale; Referee: Romeo Paparesta

29 November 1987 10	Juventus	1–0	Ascoli	Turin
14:30	Magrin 2'	Report		Stadium: Stadio Comunale; Referee: Moreno Frigerio

13 December 1987 11	Napoli	2–1	Juventus	Naples
14:30	De Napoli 26'; Maradona 87' (pen.)	Report	Cabrini 76'	Stadium: Stadio San Paolo; Referee: Rosario Lo Bello

20 December 1987 12	Juventus	1–1	Sampdoria	Turin
14:30	Cabrini 6'	Report	Vierchowod 52'	Stadium: Stadio Comunale; Referee: Paolo Casarin

3 January 1988 13	Torino	2–2	Juventus	Turin
14:30	Crippa 40'; Gritti 66'	Report	Alessio 57'; E. Rossi 84' (o.g.)	Stadium: Stadio Comunale; Referee: Pietro D'Elia

10 January 1988 14	Juventus	0–1	Milan	Turin
14:30		Report	Gullit 62'	Stadium: Stadio Comunale; Referee: Carlo Longhi

17 January 1988 15	Fiorentina	1–1	Juventus	Florence
14:30	Rebonato 58'	Report	De Agostini 19'	Stadium: Stadio Comunale; Referee: Paolo Casarin

24 January 1988 16	Como	1–1	Juventus	Como
14:30	Albiero 76'	Report	Buso 31'	Stadium: Stadio Giuseppe Sinigaglia; Referee: Luigi Agnolin

31 January 1988 17	Juventus	4–0	Empoli	Turin
15:00	Brio 2'; Magrin 16', 66'; Rush 60' (pen.)	Report		Stadium: Stadio Comunale; Referee: Carlo Sguizzato

7 February 1988 18	Pescara	2–0	Juventus	Pescara
15:00	Júnior 54'; Pagano 81'	Report		Stadium: Stadio Adriatico; Referee: Fabio Baldas

14 February 1988 19	Juventus	0–0	Verona	Turin
15:00		Report		Stadium: Stadio Comunale; Referee: Pierluigi Magni

28 February 1988 20	Roma	2–0	Juventus	Rome
15:00	Desideri 63', 78'	Report		Stadium: Stadio Olimpico; Referee: Salvatore Lombardo

6 March 1988 21	Juventus	1–0	Internazionale	Turin
15:30	Magrin 69' (pen.)	Report		Stadium: Stadio Comunale; Referee: Arcangelo Pezzella

13 March 1988 22	Avellino	1–0	Juventus	Avellino
15:30	Bertoni 25'	Report		Stadium: Stadio Partenio; Referee: Carlo Sguizzato

20 March 1988 23	Juventus	2–1	Pisa	Turin
15:30	De Agostini 25'; Tricella 65'	Report	Bernazzani 30'	Stadium: Stadio Comunale; Referee: Tullio Lanese

27 March 1988 24	Cesena	0–0	Juventus	Cesena
15:30		Report		Stadium: Stadio Dino Manuzzi; Referee: Arcangelo Pezzella

10 April 1988 25	Ascoli	1–1	Juventus	Ascoli Piceno
15:30	Giovannelli 8'	Report	Rush 31'	Stadium: Stadio Cino e Lillo Del Duca; Referee: Carlo Longhi

17 April 1988 26	Juventus	3–1	Napoli	Turin
15:30	Cabrini 19'; Rush 67'; De Agostini 74' (pen.)	Report	Careca 83'	Stadium: Stadio Comunale; Referee: Tullio Lanese

24 April 1988 27	Sampdoria	2–2	Juventus	Genoa
15:30	Bonomi 28' (pen.); Vialli 40'	Report	Buso 44'; Scirea 90'	Stadium: Stadio Luigi Ferraris; Referee: Arcangelo Pezzella

1 May 1988 28	Juventus	2–1	Torino	Turin
16:00	Tricella 29'; Rush 88'	Report	Polster 43'	Stadium: Stadio Comunale; Referee: Luigi Agnolin

8 May 1988 29	Milan	0–0	Juventus	Milan
16:00		Report		Stadium: Stadio Giuseppe Meazza; Referee: Tullio Lanese

15 May 1988 30	Juventus	1–2	Fiorentina	Turin
16:00	De Agostini 78' (pen.)	Report	Baggio 31'; Di Chiara 75'	Stadium: Stadio Comunale; Referee: Paolo Casarin

==== UEFA Cup qualification ====
23 May 1988	Juventus	0–0 (a.e.t.) (4–2 p)	Torino	Stadio Comunale Vittorio Pozzo, Turin
				Referee: Pietro D'Elia (Salerno)
	Penalties
	Vignola (penalty scored); De Agostini (penalty scored); Brio (penalty missed); Cabrini (penalty scored); Rush (penalty scored)		(penalty scored) Cravero; (penalty scored) Bresciani; (penalty missed) Comi; (penalty missed) Benedetti

Juventus qualified for 1988–89 UEFA Cup.

=== UEFA Cup ===
==== First round ====
16 September 1987 1	Valletta (Malta)	0–4	(Italy) Juventus	Ta' Qali, Malta
			Laudrup 26', 42'; Alessio 37', 70'	Stadium: National Stadium; Attendance: 18,000; Referee: John Martin (England)

30 September 1987 2	Juventus (Italy)	3–0 (7–0 agg.)	(Malta) Valletta	Turin, Italy
	Magrin 23'; Vignola 60'; Rush 87'			Stadium: Stadio Olimpico di Torino; Attendance: 15,000; Referee: Michalakis Antoniou (Cyprus)

==== Second round ====
21 October 1987 1	Panathinaikos (Greece)	1–0	(Italy) Juventus	Athens, Greece
	Saravakos 6'			Stadium: Olympic Stadium

4 November 1987 2	Juventus (Italy)	3–2 (3–3a agg.)	(Greece) Panathinaikos	Turin, Italy
	Cabrini 49', 71' (pen.); Alessio 59'		Saravakos 47'; Dimopoulos 53'	Stadium: Stadio Olimpico di Torino

=== Coppa Italia ===
First round

23 August 1987 1	Lecce	0–3	Juventus	Lecce
20:30		Report	23' Mauro; 37' Brio; 66' De Agostini	Stadium: Via del Mare; Referee: Lombardo

26 August 1987 2	Lazio	1–1 (2–4 p)	Juventus	Rome
20:30	Galderisi 2'	Report	51' Mauro	Stadium: Stadio Olimpico; Referee: Casarin
	Penalties
	Galderisi (penalty scored); Monelli (penalty scored); Pin (penalty missed); Caso (penalty missed)		(penalty scored) Magrin; (penalty scored) Vignola; (penalty scored) De Agostini; (penalty scored) Brio

30 August 1987 3	Juventus	3–0	Catanzaro	Turin
20:30	De Agostini 35'; Buso 46'; Vignola 79'	Report		Stadium: Comunale; Referee: Lo Bello

2 September 1987 4	Juventus	0–0 (4–2 p)	Casertana	Turin
20:30		Report		Stadium: Stadio Comunale Vittorio Pozzo; Referee: Cornieti
	Penalties
	Magrin (penalty scored); Vignola (penalty scored); De Agostini (penalty scored); Brio (penalty scored)		(penalty scored) Casaroli; (penalty scored) Maragiulo; (penalty missed) Pancheri; (penalty missed) D'Ottavio

6 September 1987 5	Pisa	2–1	Juventus	Pisa
20:30	Piovanelli 1'; Sclosa 15' (pen.)	Report	73' De Agostini	Stadium: Stadio Arena Garibaldi; Referee: D'Elia

Eightfinals

6 January 1988	Juventus	1–0	Pescara	Turin
14:30	Rush 74'	Report		Stadium: Comunale; Referee: Sguizzato

20 January 1988	Pescara	2–6	Juventus	Pescara
14:30	Júnior 39'; Slišković 88'	Report	19', 28', 49', 54' Rush; 23', 75' Laudrup	Stadium: Adriatico; Referee: Magni

Quarterfinals

10 February 1988	Avellino	1–1	Juventus	Avellino
14:30	Cabrini 76' (o.g.)	Report	58' Alessio	Stadium: Partenio; Referee: Longhi

2 March 1988	Juventus	1–0	Avellino	Turin
15:00	Brio 38'	Report		Stadium: Comunale; Referee: Amendolia

Semifinals

6 April 1988	Torino	2–0	Juventus	Turin
20:30	Gritti 57'; Rossi 67'	Report		Stadium: Comunale; Referee: Casarin

20 April 1988	Juventus	2–1 (2–3 agg.)	Torino	Turin
20:30	Brio 55'; De Agostini 62' (pen.)	Report	20' (o.g.) De Agostini	Stadium: Stadio Comunale Vittorio Pozzo; Referee: D'Elia

== Statistics ==
=== Players statistics ===
No.	Pos	Nat	Player	Total		Serie A		Coppa		UEFA	
No.	Pos	Nat	Player	Apps	Goals	Apps	Goals	Apps	Goals	Apps	Goals
	GK	(Italy) ITA	Stefano Tacconi	45	-42	30	-30	11	-9	4	-3
	DF	(Italy) ITA	Pasquale Bruno	34	0	21+4	0	6	0	3	0
	DF	(Italy) ITA	Sergio Brio	43	7	29	4	10	3	4	0
	DF	(Italy) ITA	Roberto Tricella	42	2	28	2	11	0	3	0
	DF	(Italy) ITA	Antonio Cabrini	37	6	25	4	9	0	3	2
	DF	(Italy) ITA	Luigi De Agostini	44	10	29	6	11	4	4	0
	MF	(San Marino) SMR	Massimo Bonini	38	0	24+2	0	8	0	4	0
	MF	(Italy) ITA	Marino Magrin	34	5	20+1	4	9	0	4	1
	MF	(Italy) ITA	Massimo Mauro	34	2	21+3	0	8	2	2	0
	FW	(Denmark) DEN	Michael Laudrup	38	4	27	0	7	2	4	2
	FW	(Wales) WAL	Ian Rush	39	13	29	7	7	5	3	1
	GK	(Italy) ITA	Luciano Bodini	0	0	0	-0	0	-0	0	-0
	DF	(Italy) ITA	Luciano Favero	31	1	20	1	7	0	4	0
	MF	(Italy) ITA	Angelo Alessio	41	6	13+14	2	10	1	4	3
	FW	(Italy) ITA	Renato Buso	28	3	7+10	2	9	1	2	0
	DF	(Italy) ITA	Nicolo Napoli	14	0	4+7	0	3	0	0	0
	DF	(Italy) ITA	Gaetano Scirea	11	1	3+3	1	4	0	1	0
	MF	(Italy) ITA	Beniamino Vignola	26	2	0+13	0	10	1	3	1

- Source: http://calcio-seriea.net/presenze/1987/956/
