= 1988–89 Juventus FC season =

Italian football club season

Juventus
1988–89 season
- Owner: Agnelli family
- President: Giampiero Boniperti
- Head Coach: Dino Zoff
- Stadium: Comunale
- Serie A: 4th
- Coppa Italia: Round 2
- UEFA Cup: Quarter-finals
- Top goalscorer: Rui Barros (12)
| Home colours | Away colours |

Juventus Football Club finished in 4th place in Serie A and participated in the Coppa Italia.

== Squad ==
Note: Flags indicate national team as defined under FIFA eligibility rules; some limited exceptions apply. Players may hold more than one non-FIFA nationality.

| Pos. | Nation | Player |
|---|---|---|
| GK | ITA | Stefano Tacconi |
| GK | ITA | Luciano Bodini |
| GK | ARG | Hugo Rubini |
| DF | ITA | Pasquale Bruno |
| DF | ITA | Roberto Tricella |
| DF | ITA | Luciano Favero |
| DF | ITA | Luigi De Agostini |
| DF | ITA | Antonio Cabrini (captain) |
| DF | ITA | Sergio Brio |
| DF | ITA | Nicolo Napoli |

| Pos. | Nation | Player |
|---|---|---|
| MF | URS | Oleksandr Zavarov |
| MF | ITA | Roberto Galia |
| MF | ITA | Giancarlo Marocchi |
| MF | POR | Rui Barros |
| MF | ITA | Marino Magrin |
| MF | ITA | Massimo Mauro |
| FW | DEN | Michael Laudrup |
| FW | ITA | Alessandro Altobelli |
| FW | ITA | Renato Buso |

=== Transfers ===
In
| Pos. | Name | from | Type |
|---|---|---|---|
| FW | Alessandro Altobelli | Internazionale | |
| MF | Roberto Galia | Hellas Verona | |
| MF | Giancarlo Marocchi | Bologna FC | |
| MF | Rui Barros | FC Porto | |
| MF | Oleksandr Zavarov | Dynamo Kyiv | |

Out
| Pos. | Name | to | Type |
|---|---|---|---|
| DF | Gaetano Scirea | | retired |
| MF | Massimo Bonini | Hellas Verona | |
| FW | Ian Rush | Liverpool | |
| MF | Angelo Alessio | Bologna FC | loan |
| MF | Beniamino Vignola | Empoli FC | |

== Competitions ==
=== Serie A ===
==== League table ====
| Pos | Team | Pld | W | D | L | GF | GA | GD | Pts | Qualification or relegation |
|---|---|---|---|---|---|---|---|---|---|---|
| 2 | Napoli | 34 | 18 | 11 | 5 | 57 | 28 | +29 | 47 | Qualification to UEFA Cup |
| 3 | Milan (Note: Milan qualified for the 1989–90 European Cup as the 1988–89 European Cup defending champions.) | 34 | 16 | 14 | 4 | 61 | 25 | +36 | 46 | Qualification to European Cup |
| 4 | Juventus | 34 | 15 | 13 | 6 | 51 | 36 | +15 | 43 | Qualification to UEFA Cup |
| 5 | Sampdoria | 34 | 14 | 11 | 9 | 43 | 25 | +18 | 39 | Qualification to Cup Winners' Cup |
| 6 | Atalanta | 34 | 11 | 14 | 9 | 37 | 32 | +5 | 36 | Qualification to UEFA Cup |

Source: 1988–89 Serie A, RSSSF.com
Rules for classification: 1) Points; 2) Head-to-head points; 3) Head-to-head goal difference; 4) Goal difference; 5) Goals scored; 6) Draw.

==== Results by round ====
| Round | 1 | 2 | 3 | 4 | 5 | 6 | 7 | 8 | 9 | 10 | 11 | 12 | 13 | 14 | 15 | 16 | 17 | 18 | 19 | 20 | 21 | 22 | 23 | 24 | 25 | 26 | 27 | 28 | 29 | 30 | 31 | 32 | 33 | 34 |
|---|---|---|---|---|---|---|---|---|---|---|---|---|---|---|---|---|---|---|---|---|---|---|---|---|---|---|---|---|---|---|---|---|---|---|
| Ground | A | H | A | H | A | H | H | A | H | A | H | A | A | H | A | H | A | H | A | H | A | H | A | A | H | A | H | A | H | H | A | H | A | H |
| Result | W | D | D | D | W | L | W | W | D | D | W | W | L | L | D | D | L | D | W | W | L | W | W | L | W | W | D | D | W | D | D | W | D | W |
| Position | 2 | 4 | 5 | 6 | 4 | 6 | 4 | 3 | 3 | 4 | 4 | 3 | 4 | 5 | 5 | 6 | 6 | 6 | 6 | 6 | 6 | 5 | 5 | 5 | 5 | 4 | 4 | 4 | 4 | 4 | 4 | 4 | 4 | 4 |

Source: Competitive matches
A = Away; H = Home; W = Win; D = Draw; L = Loss; = 1989–90 European Cup; = 1989–90 UEFA Cup

==== Matches ====
| 9 October 1988 1 | Como | 0–3 | Juventus | Como |
| 15:00 CET | | Report | De Agostini 3'; Laudrup 10'; Buso 32' | Stadium: Sinigaglia; Referee: D'Elia |

| 16 October 1988 2 | Juventus | 2–2 | Cesena | Turin |
| 15:00 CET | Zavarov 27'; De Agostini 41' (pen.) | Report | Domini 35'; Cuttone 81' | Stadium: Comunale |

| 23 October 1988 3 | Ascoli | 1–1 | Juventus | Ascoli Piceno |
| 15:00 CET | Dell'Oglio 62' | Report | Laudrup 69' | Stadium: Cino e Lillo Del Duca |

| 30 October 1988 4 | Juventus | 0–0 | Milan | Turin |
| 14:30 CET | | Report | | Stadium: Comunale |

| 6 November 1988 5 | Bologna | 3–4 | Juventus | Bologna |
| 14:30 CET | Poli 66'; Alessio 81, 88' | Report | Rui Barros 15'; Altobelli 42'; Demol 52' (o.g.); Laudrup 75' | Stadium: Renato Dall'Ara |

| 20 November 1988 6 | Juventus | 3–5 | Napoli | Turin |
| 14:30 CET | Galia 48'; Zavarov 55'; De Agostini 77' (pen.) | Report | Carnevale 3'; Careca 30, 44, 58'; Renica 85' (pen.) | Stadium: Comunale; Referee: Lanese |

| 27 November 1988 7 | Juventus | 1–0 | Lecce | Turin |
| 14:30 CET | Rui Barros 12' | Report | | Stadium: Comunale |

| 4 December 1988 8 | Pisa | 1–4 | Juventus | Pisa |
| 14:30 CET | Been 85' (pen.) | Report | Rui Barros 4'; Altobelli 33'; Laudrup 47'; Cabrini 80' (pen.) | Stadium: Arena Garibaldi |

| 11 December 1988 9 | Juventus | 0–0 | Sampdoria | Turin |
| 14:30 CET | | Report | | Stadium: Comunale |

| 18 December 1988 10 | Internazionale | 1–1 | Juventus | Milan |
| 14:30 CET | Serena 20' | Report | Galia 54' | Stadium: Giuseppe Meazza |

| 31 December 1988 11 | Juventus | 1–0 | Torino | Turin |
| 14:30 CET | Altobelli 62' | Report | | Stadium: Comunale |

| 8 January 1989 12 | Roma | 1–3 | Juventus | Rome |
| 14:30 CET | Giannini 84' (pen.) | Report | Altobelli 12'; Rui Barros 78'; Cabrini 90' (pen.) | Stadium: Olimpico |

| 15 January 1989 13 | Fiorentina | 2–1 | Juventus | Florence |
| 14:30 CET | Baggio 39' (pen.); Borgonovo 88' | Report | Rui Barros 33' | Stadium: Comunale |

| 22 January 1989 14 | Juventus | 0–1 | Atalanta | Turin |
| 14:30 CET | | Report | Evair 88' | Stadium: Comunale |

| 29 January 1989 15 | Lazio | 0–0 | Juventus | Rome |
| 14:30 CEST | | Report | | Stadium: Olimpico; Referee: Magni |

| 5 February 1989 16 | Juventus | 1–1 | Pescara | Turin |
| 14:30 CEST | Rui Barros 49' | Report | Tita 43' | Stadium: Comunale; Referee: Frigerio |

| 12 February 1989 17 | Verona | 2–0 | Juventus | Verona |
| 14:30 CEST | Pacione 15, 18' | Report | | Stadium: Marcantonio Bentegodi; Referee: Longhi |

| 19 February 1989 18 | Juventus | 0–0 | Como | Turin |
| 14:30 CET | | Report | | Stadium: Comunale |

| 26 February 1989 19 | Cesena | 1–2 | Juventus | Cesena |
| 15:00 CET | Agostini 89' | Report | Rui Barros 47, 85' |

| 5 March 1989 20 | Juventus | 2–0 | Ascoli | Turin |
| 15:00 CET | Arslanović 5' (o.g.); Marocchi 39' | Report | | Stadium: Comunale |

| 12 March 1989 21 | Milan | 4–0 | Juventus | Milan |
| 14:30 CET | Tricella 12' (o.g.); Evani 14'; Mannari 69, 86' | Report | | Stadium: San Siro |

| 19 March 1989 22 | Juventus | 2–0 | Bologna | Turin |
| 15:00 CET | Laudrup 49'; Rui Barros 56' | Report | | Stadium: Comunale |

| 1 April 1989 23 | Napoli | 2–4 | Juventus | Naples |
| 16:00 CET | De Napoli 5'; Careca 49' | Report | Napoli 8'; Buso 31, 61'; Magrin 90' (pen.) | Stadium: San Paolo |

| 9 April 1989 24 | Lecce | 2–0 | Juventus | Lecce |
| 16:00 CET | Moriero 54'; Pasculli 65' (pen.) | Report | | Stadium: Via del Mare |

| 16 April 1989 25 | Juventus | 3–1 | Pisa | Turin |
| 16:00 CET | Buso 10'; De Agostini 30' (pen.); Napoli 73' | Report | Piovanelli 45' | Stadium: Comunale |

| 30 April 1989 26 | Sampdoria | 1–2 | Juventus | Genoa |
| 16:00 CET | Mancini 20' | Report | De Agostini 68' (pen.); Galia 86' | Stadium: Luigi Ferraris |

| 7 May 1989 27 | Juventus | 1–1 | Internazionale | Turin |
| 16:30 CET | Rui Barros 29' | Report | Serena 55' | Stadium: Comunale |

| 14 May 1989 28 | Torino | 0–0 | Juventus | Turin |
| 16:30 CET | | Report | | Stadium: Comunale |

| 21 May 1989 29 | Juventus | 2–1 | Roma | Turin |
| 16:30 CET | Manfredonia 23' (o.g.); Magrin 84' (pen.) | Report | Giannini 28' (pen.) | Stadium: Comunale |

| 28 May 1989 30 | Juventus | 1–1 | Fiorentina | Turin |
| 16:30 CET | Buso 4' | Report | Cucchi 53' | Stadium: Comunale |

| 4 June 1989 31 | Atalanta | 0–0 | Juventus | Bergamo |
| 17:00 CET | | Report | | Stadium: Comunale |

| 11 June 1989 32 | Juventus | 4–2 | Lazio | Turin |
| 17:00 CET | Buso 21, 79'; Piscedda 58' (o.g.); De Agostini 66' | Report | Gregucci 17'; Sosa 42' | Stadium: Comunale |

| 18 June 1989 33 | Pescara | 0–0 | Juventus | Pescara |
| 17:00 CET | | Report | | Stadium: Adriatico |

| 25 June 1989 34 | Juventus | 3–0 | Verona | Turin |
| 17:00 CET | Laudrup 3'; Rui Barros 73, 79' | Report | | Stadium: Comunale |

==== Top scorers ====
- (Portugal) Rui Barros 12
- (Italy) Renato Buso 7
- (Denmark) Michael Laudrup 6
- (Italy) Luigi De Agostini 6 (4)
- (Italy) Alessandro Altobelli 4
- (Italy) Roberto Galia 3

=== Coppa Italia ===
First round

| 21 August 1988 1 | Cosenza | 0–0 | Juventus | Cosenza |
| 20:30 CEST | | Report | | Stadium: Stadio San Vito; Referee: Pezzella |

| 24 August 1988 2 | Juventus | 5–1 | Vicenza | Torino |
| 20:30 CEST | Altobelli 17', 36' (pen.), 50'; Laudrup 19', 53' | Report | 82' Pizzi | Stadium: Comunale; Referee: Felicani |

| 28 August 1988 3 | Atalanta | 1–1 | Juventus | Bergamo |
| 20:30 CEST | Fortunato 52' | Report | 42' Altobelli | Stadium: Comunale; Referee: Lanese |

| 31 August 1988 4 | Taranto | 2–4 | Juventus | Taranto |
| 17:00 CEST | Lerda 35'; D'Ignazio 71' | Report | 37', 55', 88' (pen.) Altobelli; 84' Rui Barros | Stadium: Stadio Erasmo Iacovone; Referee: Sguizzato |

| 3 September 1988 5 | Hellas Verona | 2–2 | Juventus | Verona |
| 20:30 CET | Brio 43' (o.g.); Galderisi 52' (pen.) | Report | 46' Alessio; 64' Cabrini | Stadium: Marcantonio Bentegodi; Referee: Cornieti |

Second round

| 14 September 1988 1 | Juventus | 0–2 | Ascoli | Turin |
| 20:30 CEST | | Report | 16' (o.g.) Zavarov; 29' Benetti | Stadium: Comunale; Referee: Baldas F. |

| 21 September 1988 2 | Juventus | 0–0 | Como | Turin |
| 20:30 CEST | | Report | | Stadium: Comunale; Referee: Luci |

| 28 September 1988 3 | Brescia | 0–2 | Juventus | Brescia |
| 20:30 CET | | Report | 9', 29' Zavarov | Stadium: Stadio Mario Rigamonti; Referee: Coppetelli |

=== UEFA Cup ===
First round

| 7 September 1988 1 | Oţelul Galaţi (Romania) | 1–0 | (Italy) Juventus | Galaţi, Romania |
| | Profir 59' (pen.) | | | Stadium: Dunărea Stadium; Attendance: 30,000; Referee: (Turkey) Yusuf Namoğlu |

| 12 October 1988 2 | Juventus (Italy) | 5–0 (5–1 agg.) | (Romania) Oţelul Galaţi | Turin, Italy |
| | De Agostini 17'; Agiu 26' (o.g.); Rui Barros 28', 71'; Altobelli 49' | | | Stadium: Stadio Olimpico di Torino; Attendance: 25,000; Referee: (Wales) Clive Thomas |

==== Second round ====
| 26 October 1988 1 | Juventus (Italy) | 5–1 | (Spain) Athletic Bilbao | Turin, Italy |
| | Laudrup 3' 51'; Galia 23'; Mauro 40'; Altobelli 47' | | Uralde 35' | Stadium: Stadio Olimpico di Torino; Attendance: 50,000; Referee: (England) Neil Midgley |

| 9 November 1988 2 | Athletic Bilbao (Spain) | 3–2 (4–7 agg.) | (Italy) Juventus | Bilbao, Spain |
| | Uralde 56'; Andrinúa 57' 69' | | Laudrup 34'; Galia 77' | Stadium: San Mamés Stadium; Attendance: 25,000; Referee: (Sweden) Erik Fredriksson |

==== Third round ====
| 23 November 1988 1 | Liège (Belgium) | 0–1 | (Italy) Juventus | Liège, Belgium |
| | | | Altobelli 18' |

| 7 December 1988 2 | Juventus (Italy) | 1–0 (2–0 agg.) | (Belgium) Liège | Turin, Italy |
| | Altobelli 16' | | | Stadium: Stadio Olimpico di Torino |

==== Quarter-finals ====
| 1 March 1989 1 | Juventus (Italy) | 2–0 | (Italy) Napoli | Turin, Italy |
| | Bruno 13'; Corradini 45' (o.g.) | | | Stadium: Stadio Olimpico di Torino |

| 15 March 1989 2 | Napoli (Italy) | 3–0 (a.e.t.) (3–2 agg.) | (Italy) Juventus | Naples, Italy |
| | Maradona 10' (pen.); Carnevale 45'; Renica 120' | | | Stadium: Stadio San Paolo |

== Statistics ==
=== Players statistics ===
| No. | Pos | Nat | Player | Total | | Serie A | | Coppa | | UEFA | |
| No. | Pos | Nat | Player | Apps | Goals | Apps | Goals | Apps | Goals | Apps | Goals |
|---|---|---|---|---|---|---|---|---|---|---|---|
| | GK | (Italy) ITA | Stefano Tacconi | 47 | -49 | 34 | -36 | 5 | -5 | 8 | -8 |
| | DF | (Italy) ITA | Pasquale Bruno | 36 | 1 | 22+1 | 0 | 8 | 0 | 5 | 1 |
| | DF | (Italy) ITA | Roberto Tricella | 43 | 0 | 33 | 0 | 3 | 0 | 7 | 0 |
| | DF | (Italy) ITA | Luciano Favero | 34 | 0 | 22+1 | 0 | 5 | 0 | 6 | 0 |
| | DF | (Italy) ITA | Luigi De Agostini | 39 | 7 | 26+1 | 6 | 5 | 0 | 7 | 1 |
| | MF | (Soviet Union) URS | Oleksandr Zavarov | 35 | 4 | 32 | 2 | 2 | 2 | 1 | 0 |
| | MF | (Italy) ITA | Roberto Galia | 42 | 5 | 32 | 3 | 3 | 0 | 7 | 2 |
| | MF | (Italy) ITA | Giancarlo Marocchi | 49 | 1 | 34 | 1 | 8 | 0 | 7 | 0 |
| | MF | (Portugal) POR | Rui Barros | 45 | 15 | 27+2 | 12 | 8 | 1 | 8 | 2 |
| | FW | (Denmark) DEN | Michael Laudrup | 41 | 12 | 24+2 | 6 | 7 | 2 | 8 | 4 |
| | FW | (Italy) ITA | Alessandro Altobelli | 34 | 15 | 18+2 | 4 | 6 | 7 | 8 | 4 |
| | GK | (Italy) ITA | Luciano Bodini | 5 | -3 | 1 | -0 | 4 | -3 | 0 | -0 |
| | MF | (Italy) ITA | Massimo Mauro | 33 | 1 | 17+4 | 0 | 4 | 0 | 8 | 1 |
| | DF | (Italy) ITA | Antonio Cabrini | 24 | 3 | 15 | 2 | 4 | 1 | 5 | 0 |
| | FW | (Italy) ITA | Renato Buso | 30 | 7 | 14+10 | 7 | 4 | 0 | 2 | 0 |
| | DF | (Italy) ITA | Sergio Brio | 28 | 0 | 13+1 | 0 | 8 | 0 | 6 | 0 |
| | DF | (Italy) ITA | Nicolo Napoli | 16 | 2 | 10+2 | 2 | 3 | 0 | 1 | 0 |
| | MF | (Italy) ITA | Marino Magrin | 30 | 2 | 5+18 | 2 | 3 | 0 | 4 | 0 |

- Source: http://calcio-seriea.net/presenze/1988/967/
