= 1985–86 Juventus FC season =

Italian football club season

Juventus
1985–86 season
- Owner: Agnelli family
- Chairman: Giampiero Boniperti
- Manager: Giovanni Trapattoni
- Stadium: Comunale
- Serie A: 1st
- Coppa Italia: Round of 16
- European Cup: Quarter-finals
- Intercontinental Cup: Champions
- Top goalscorer: League: Platini (12); All: Serena (20)
- Average home league attendance: 39,654
Home colours	Away colours
- All statistics correct as of 27 April 1986.

Juventus Football Club finished in first place in the 1985–86 Serie A season.

== Overview ==
Juventus sold Boniek, Paolo Rossi and Tardelli replacing them with Laudrup, Manfredonia and Aldo Serena. Domestic league started off with 8 wins in row, a new record, like the 30 points gained in first 15 games. In December Juventus also won Intercontinental Cup, beating Argentinos Juniors on shoot-out.

Defeated by Barcellona in European Cup side lost against Roma and Fiorentina in league, leaving a hope for giallorossi. Anyway, Juventus did not fail to conquest Scudetto thank to wins over Milan and Lecce that – in previous matchday – had beat Roma giving to Trapattoni's team a free way toward the title.

== Squad ==
Note: Flags indicate national team as defined under FIFA eligibility rules; some limited exceptions apply. Players may hold more than one non-FIFA nationality.

Pos.	Nation	Player
GK	ITA	Stefano Tacconi
GK	ITA	Luciano Bodini
DF	ITA	Luciano Favero
DF	ITA	Antonio Cabrini
DF	ITA	Sergio Brio
DF	ITA	Gaetano Scirea (Captain)
DF	ITA	Stefano Pioli
DF	ITA	Nicola Caricola
MF	ITA	Massimo Mauro

Pos.	Nation	Player
MF	DEN	Michael Laudrup
MF	SMR	Massimo Bonini
MF	ITA	Lionello Manfredonia
MF	ITA	Gabriele Pin
MF	ITA	Ivano Bonetti
MF	FRA	Michel Platini
FW	ITA	Aldo Serena
FW	ITA	Marco Pacione
FW	ITA	Massimo Briaschi

=== Transfers ===
In
Pos.	Name	from	Type
FW	Michael Laudrup	SS Lazio	loan ended
FW	Aldo Serena	Inter	
MF	Lionello Manfredonia	SS Lazio	
MF	Gabriele Pin	Parma	
MF	Ivano Bonetti	Genoa	
FW	Marco Pacione	Atalanta	
MF	Massimo Mauro	Udinese	

Out
Pos.	Name	to	Type
FW	Paolo Rossi	AC Milan	
FW	Zbigniew Boniek	AS Roma	
FW	Marco Tardelli	Inter	
MF	Beniamino Vignola	Hellas Verona	
MF	Bruno Limido	Atalanta	
MF	Giovanni Koetting	Ancona	
MF	Cesare Prandelli	Atalanta	

== Competitions ==
=== Serie A ===
==== League table ====
Pos	Team	Pld	W	D	L	GF	GA	GD	Pts	Qualification or relegation
1	Juventus (C)	30	18	9	3	43	17	+26	45	Qualification to European Cup
2	Roma	30	19	3	8	51	27	+24	41	Qualification to Cup Winners' Cup
3	Napoli	30	14	11	5	35	21	+14	39	Qualification to UEFA Cup
4	Torino	30	11	11	8	31	26	+5	33	Qualification to UEFA Cup
5	Fiorentina	30	10	13	7	29	23	+6	33	Qualification to UEFA Cup

Source: RSSSF.com
Rules for classification: 1) Points; 2) Head-to-head points; 3) Head-to-head goal difference; 4) Goal difference; 5) Goals scored; 6) Draw. (Note: Head-to-head record is used only after all the matches between the teams in question have been played).
(C) Champions

==== Results by round ====
Round	1	2	3	4	5	6	7	8	9	10	11	12	13	14	15	16	17	18	19	20	21	22	23	24	25	26	27	28	29	30
Ground	H	A	H	A	H	A	H	A	H	A	H	A	H	A	H	H	A	H	A	H	A	H	A	H	A	H	A	H	A	H
Result	W	W	W	W	W	W	W	W	L	W	D	W	D	W	W	D	D	D	W	D	D	W	W	D	L	W	L	D	W	W
Position	5	2	1	1	1	1	1	1	1	1	1	1	1	1	1	1	1	1	1	1	1	1	1	1	1	1	1	2	1	1

Source: http://calcio-seriea.net/allenatori_squadra/1985/903/
A = Away; H = Home; W = Win; D = Draw; L = Loss; = 1986–87 European Cup; = 1986–87 UEFA Cup

==== Matches ====
8 September 1985 1	Juventus	1–0	Avellino	Turin
	Serena 52'	Report		Stadium: Comunale

15 September 1985 2	Como	0–1	Juventus	Como
		Report	Brio 50'	Stadium: Giuseppe Sinigaglia; Referee: Luigi Agnolin (Bassano del Grappa)

22 September 1985 3	Juventus	3–1	Pisa	Turin
	Serena 25, 83'; Laudrup 66'	Report	Kieft 69'	Stadium: Comunale; Referee: Arcangelo Pezzella

29 September 1985 4	Verona	0–1	Juventus	Verona
		Report	Laudrup 18'	Stadium: Marcantonio Bentegodi; Referee: Tullio Lanese

6 October 1985 5	Juventus	2–0	Atalanta	Turin
	Serena 4'; Laudrup 69'	Report		Stadium: Comunale; Referee: Roberto Bianciardi

13 October 1985 6	Torino	1–2	Juventus	Turin
	Scirea 39' (o.g.)	Report	Serena 4'; Platini 28'	Stadium: Comunale; Referee: Luigi Agnolin

20 October 1985 7	Juventus	4–0	Bari	Turin
	Platini 40'; Platini 63'; Platini 83'; Gridelli 55' (o.g.)	Report		Stadium: Comunale; Referee: Carlo Longhi

27 October 1985 8	Udinese	1–2	Juventus	Udine
	Cabrini 82' (o.g.)	Report	Serena 20'; Favero 50'	Stadium: Friuli; Referee: Paolo Casarin

3 November 1985 9	Napoli	1–0	Juventus	Naples
	Maradona 72'	Report		Stadium: Stadio San Paolo; Referee: Giancarlo Redini

10 November 1985 10	Juventus	3–1	Roma	Turin
	Mauro 10'; Platini 58'; Serena 70'	Report	Pruzzo 37' (pen.)	Stadium: Comunale; Referee: Rosario Lo Bello

24 November 1985 11	Internazionale	1–1	Juventus	Milan
	Bergomi 1'	Report	Platini 52'	Stadium: Giuseppe Meazza; Referee: Pietro D'Elia

1 December 1985 12	Juventus	1–0	Fiorentina	Turin
	Brio 12'	Report		Stadium: Comunale; Referee: Salvatore Lombardo

15 December 1985 14	Milan	0–0	Juventus	Milan
		Report		Stadium: San Siro; Referee: Maurizio Mattei

22 December 1985 15	Juventus	4–0	Lecce	Turin
	Serena 22, 43'; Platini 51, 57'	Report		Stadium: Comunale; Referee: Sergio Coppetelli

31 December 1985 13	Juventus	1–0	Sampdoria	Turin
	Platini 39'	Report		Stadium: Comunale; Referee: Paolo Casarin
Note: Rescheduled on 8 December 1985 due to Juventus's participation in the 1985 Intercontinental Cup.

5 January 1986 16	Avellino	0–0	Juventus	Avellino
		Report		Stadium: Partenio; Referee: Claudio Pieri

12 January 1986 17	Juventus	0–0	Como	Turin
		Report		Stadium: Comunale; Referee: Maurizio Mattei

19 January 1986 18	Pisa	1–1	Juventus	Pisa
	Kieft 24' (pen.)	Report	Platini 48' (pen.)	Stadium: Arena Garibaldi; Referee: Pietro D'Elia

26 January 1986 19	Juventus	3–0	Verona	Turin
	Platini 49'; Serena 69'; Laudrup 71'	Report		Stadium: Comunale; Referee: Claudio Pieri

9 February 1986 20	Atalanta	0–0	Juventus	Bergamo
		Report		Stadium: Atleti Azzurri d'Italia; Referee: Tullio Lanese

16 February 1986 21	Juventus	1–1	Torino	Turin
	Laudrup 25'	Report	Zaccarelli 87'	Stadium: Comunale; Referee: Paolo Casarin

23 February 1986 22	Bari	0–3	Juventus	Bari
		Report	Cabrini 28'; Pin 65'; Briaschi 73'	Stadium: della Vittoria; Referee: Claudio Pieri

2 March 1986 23	Juventus	2–1	Udinese	Turin
	Briaschi 9'; Platini 66'	Report	Miano 56'	Stadium: Comunale; Referee: Tullio Lanese

9 March 1986 24	Juventus	1–1	Napoli	Turin
	Brio 49'	Report	Favero 34' (o.g.)	Stadium: Comunale; Referee: Rosario Lo Bello

16 March 1986 25	Roma	3–0	Juventus	Rome
	Graziani 3'; Pruzzo 28'; Cerezo 83'	Report		Stadium: Olimpico; Referee: Luigi Agnolin

23 March 1986 26	Juventus	2–0	Internazionale	Turin
	Platini 41' (pen.); Bonini 85'	Report		Stadium: Comunale; Referee: Pietro D'Elia

2 March 1986 27	Fiorentina	2–0	Juventus	Florence
	Passarella 57'; Berti 90'	Report		Stadium: Comunale; Referee: Paolo Casarin

13 April 1986 28	Sampdoria	0–0	Juventus	Genoa
		Report		Stadium: Luigi Ferraris; Referee: Tullio Lanese

20 April 1986 29	Juventus	1–0	Milan	Turin
	Laudrup 63'	Report		Stadium: Comunale; Referee: Claudio Pieri

27 April 1986 30	Lecce	2–3	Juventus	Lecce
	Miceli 73'; Di Chiara 86'	Report	Mauro 69'; Cabrini 79'; Serena 85'	Stadium: Via del Mare; Referee: Luigi Agnolin

=== Coppa Italia ===
First Round

21 August 1985 1	Perugia	0–0	Juventus	Perugia
				Stadium: Renato Curi; Referee: Paparesta

25 August 1985 2	Juventus	6–2	Casertana	Turin
	Laudrup 13'; Serena 33', 34', 47'; Mauro II 59'; Pin 79'		72' Ianniello; 81' Bonaldi	Stadium: Comunale; Referee: Coppetelli

28 August 1985 3	Juventus	1–1	Monza	Turin
	Manfredonia 46'		33' Antonelli	Stadium: Comunale; Referee: Boschi

1 September 1985 4	Palermo	1–3	Juventus	Palermo
	De Vitis 19' (pen.)		22' Laudrup; 26' (pen.) Platini; 53' Serena	Stadium: La Favorita; Referee: Pieri

4 September 1985 5	Fiorentina	1–0	Juventus	Florence
	Passarella 75' (pen.)			Stadium: Comunale; Referee: Magni

Eightfinals

29 January 1986	Como	1–0	Juventus	Como
	Corneliusson 17'			Stadium: Giuseppe Sinigaglia; Referee: Pezzella

12 February 1986	Juventus	1–1 (1–2 agg.)	Como	Turin
	Bonini 42'		46' (o.g.) Brio	Stadium: Comunale; Referee: Lombardo

=== European Cup ===
==== First round ====
18 September 1985 1	Jeunesse Esch (Luxembourg)	0–5	(Italy) Juventus	Esch-sur-Alzette, Luxembourg
		Report	Laudrup 21'; Cabrini 35'; Ontano 42' (o.g.); Serena 80', 83'	Stadium: Stade de la Frontière

2 October 1985 2	Juventus (Italy)	4–1 (9–1 agg.)	(Luxembourg) Jeunesse Esch	Turin, Italy
	Platini 23'; Pin 50'; Serena 52' (pen.), 64'	Report	Guillot 67'	Stadium: Stadio Olimpico di Torino

==== Second round ====
23 October 1985 1	Hellas Verona (Italy)	0–0	(Italy) Juventus	Verona, Italy
				Stadium: Stadio Marcantonio Bentegodi

6 November 1985 2	Juventus (Italy)	2–0 (2–0 agg.)	(Italy) Hellas Verona	Turin, Italy
	Platini 19' (pen.); Serena 50'			Stadium: Stadio Olimpico di Torino

==== Quarter-finals ====
5 March 1986 1	FC Barcelona (Spain)	1–0	(Italy) Juventus	Barcelona, Spain
	Julio Alberto 82'			Stadium: Camp Nou

19 March 1986 2	Juventus (Italy)	1–1 (1–2 agg.)	(Spain) FC Barcelona	Turin, Italy
	Platini 44'		Archibald 32'	Stadium: Stadio Olimpico di Torino

=== UEFA SuperCup ===
Everton (England)	(abd.)	(Italy) Juventus	Liverpool
			Stadium: Goodison Park
Note: English teams were banned by UEFA from its competitions from the season 1985–86 on until the season 1990–91 because of the Heysel Disaster in 1985, involving Liverpool fans.

Juventus (Italy)	(abd.)	(England) Everton	Turin
			Stadium: Comunale
Note: English teams were banned by UEFA from its competitions from the season 1985–86 on until the season 1990–91 because of the Heysel Disaster in 1985, involving Liverpool fans.

=== Intercontinental Cup ===
1985 Intercontinental Cup
8 December 1985
12:00 UTC+9

Juventus (Italy)	2–2 (a.e.t.)	(Argentina) Argentinos Juniors
Platini 63' (pen.); Laudrup 82'	Report	Ereros 55'; Castro 75'
Penalties
Brio (penalty scored); Cabrini (penalty scored); Serena (penalty scored); Laudrup (penalty missed); Platini (penalty scored)	4–2	(penalty scored) Olguín; (penalty missed) Batista; (penalty scored) López; (penalty missed) Pavoni

National Stadium, Tokyo
Attendance: 62,000
Referee: Volker Roth (West Germany)

== Statistics ==
=== Team statistics ===
Updated to April 27, 1986.

Competition	Points	Home				Away				Overall				Goals for	Goals against	Goal difference
Competition	Points	P	W	D	L	P	W	D	L	P	W	D	L	Goals for	Goals against	Goal difference
Serie A	45	15	12	3	0	15	6	6	3	30	18	9	3	43	17	26
Coppa Italia	–	3	1	2	0	4	1	1	2	7	2	3	2	11	7	4
European Cup	–	3	2	1	0	3	1	1	1	6	3	2	1	12	3	9
Intercontinental Cup	–	1	0	1	0	0	0	0	0	1	0	1	0	2	2	0
Overall	–	21	15	6	0	23	8	9	6	44	23	15	6	68	29	39

=== Players statistics ===
Appearances and goals in league.

No.	Pos	Nat	Player	Total		Serie A		Coppa		European Cup		Other	
No.	Pos	Nat	Player	Apps	Goals	Apps	Goals	Apps	Goals	Apps	Goals	Apps	Goals
	GK	(Italy) ITA	Stefano Tacconi	44	-29	30	-17	7	-7	6	-3	1	-2
	DF	(Italy) ITA	Luciano Favero	44	1	30	1	7	0	6	0	1	0
	DF	(Italy) ITA	Sergio Brio	42	3	29	3	6	0	6	0	1	0
	DF	(Italy) ITA	Gaetano Scirea	36	0	25	0	5	0	5	0	1	0
	DF	(Italy) ITA	Antonio Cabrini	43	3	30	2	6	0	6	1	1	0
	MF	(Italy) ITA	Massimo Mauro	41	3	28	2	6	1	6	0	1	0
	MF	(San Marino) SMR	Massimo Bonini	40	2	25+1	1	7	1	6	0	1	0
	MF	(Italy) ITA	Lionello Manfredonia	36	1	22+1	0	6	1	6	0	1	0
	MF	(France) FRA	Michel Platini	41	17	30	12	4	1	6	3	1	1
	FW	(Denmark) DEN	Michael Laudrup	41	11	29	7	6	2	5	1	1	1
	FW	(Italy) ITA	Aldo Serena	35	20	25	11	5	4	4	5	1	0
	GK	(Italy) ITA	Luciano Bodini	0	0	0	0	0	0	0	0	0	0
	MF	(Italy) ITA	Gabriele Pin	32	3	8+13	1	7	1	4	1		
	DF	(Italy) ITA	Stefano Pioli	22	0	7+7	0	3	0	4	0	1	0
	FW	(Italy) ITA	Massimo Briaschi	14	2	7+3	2	2	0	1	0	1	0
	FW	(Italy) ITA	Marco Pacione	23	0	4+8	0	7	0	4	0		
	DF	(Italy) ITA	Nicola Caricola	9	0	1+4	0	2	0	2	0		
	MF	(Italy) ITA	Ivano Bonetti	10	0	0+2	0	7	0	1	0		

- Source: http://calcio-seriea.net/presenze/1985/922/
