= 1986–87 Juventus FC season =

Italian football club season

Juventus
1986–87 season
- Owner: Agnelli family
- Chairman: Giampiero Boniperti
- Manager: Rino Marchesi
- Stadium: Comunale
- Serie A: 2nd
- Coppa Italia: Quarter-finals
- European Cup: Second Round
- Top goalscorer: League: Serena (10); All: Serena (16)
- Average home league attendance: 3,554
Home colours	Away colours	Third colours
- All statistics correct as of 17 May 1987.

Juventus Football Club finished in second place in the 1986–87 Serie A season.

== Overview ==
Juventus and Trapattoni's ways got distance each other, with the coach taken from Internazionale and Rino Marchesi called to replace him. Reigning champion tried to retain domestic title, but met in Napoli a difficult opponent. European hopes were stopped in autumn, due to shoot-out loss against Real Madrid.

The following Sunday, Juventus was also beaten by partenopei. They proved to be a stronger team than bianconeri, defeating them even in retour match. Marchesi managed, eventually, to reach second place thank Inter's stop in last game. It also signed Platini's retirement, announced from him after Juventus-Brescia.

== Squad ==
Note: Flags indicate national team as defined under FIFA eligibility rules; some limited exceptions apply. Players may hold more than one non-FIFA nationality.

Pos.	Nation	Player
GK	ITA	Stefano Tacconi
GK	ITA	Luciano Bodini
DF	ITA	Luciano Favero
DF	ITA	Sergio Brio
DF	ITA	Gaetano Scirea (Captain)
DF	ITA	Nicola Caricola
DF	ITA	Roberto Soldà
DF	ITA	Antonio Cabrini
DF	ITA	Stefano Pioli
MF	ITA	Lionello Manfredonia

Pos.	Nation	Player
MF	ITA	Massimo Mauro
MF	SMR	Massimo Bonini
MF	DEN	Michael Laudrup
MF	ITA	Beniamino Vignola
MF	ITA	Ivano Bonetti
MF	ITA	Marco Bruzzano
FW	FRA	Michel Platini
FW	ITA	Aldo Serena
FW	ITA	Massimo Briaschi
FW	ITA	Renato Buso

=== Transfers ===
In
Pos.	Name	from	Type
DF	Roberto Soldà	Atalanta BC	
MF	Beniamino Vignola	Hellas Verona	loan ended

Out
Pos.	Name	to	Type
MF	Gabriele Pin	SS Lazio	
FW	Marco Pacione	Hellas Verona	

== Competitions ==
=== Serie A ===
==== League table ====
Pos	Team	Pld	W	D	L	GF	GA	GD	Pts	Qualification or relegation
1	Napoli (C)	30	15	12	3	41	21	+20	42	Qualification to European Cup
2	Juventus	30	14	11	5	42	27	+15	39	Qualification to UEFA Cup
3	Inter Milan	30	15	8	7	32	17	+15	38	Qualification to UEFA Cup
4	Hellas Verona	30	12	12	6	36	25	+11	36	Qualification to UEFA Cup
5	Milan (Note: Milan won the UEFA Cup qualification match against Sampdoria 1–0, thus qualifying for the 1987–88 UEFA Cup.)	30	13	9	8	31	21	+10	35	Qualification to UEFA Cup

Source: 1986–87 Serie A, RSSSF.com
Rules for classification: 1) Points; 2) Head-to-head points; 3) Head-to-head goal difference; 4) Goal difference; 5) Goals scored; 6) Draw. (Note: Head-to-head record is used only after all the matches between the teams in question have been played).
(C) Champions

==== Position by round ====
Round	1	2	3	4	5	6	7	8	9	10	11	12	13	14	15	16	17	18	19	20	21	22	23	24	25	26	27	28	29	30
Ground	A	H	A	H	A	A	H	A	H	H	A	H	A	H	A	H	A	H	A	H	H	A	H	A	A	H	A	H	A	H
Result	W	W	W	D	D	W	D	D	L	W	L	W	L	W	D	W	D	W	D	W	D	L	W	L	D	W	D	W	D	W
Position	1	1	1	1	1	1	1	1	3	2	5	3	4	4	4	3	3	3	4	2	4	5	4	4	4	3	3	3	3	2

Source: Competitive matches
A = Away; H = Home; W = Win; D = Draw; L = Loss; = 1987–88 European Cup; = 1987–88 UEFA Cup

==== Matches ====
14 September 1986 1	Udinese	0–2	Juventus	Udine
		Report	Brio 20'; Manfredonia 61'	Stadium: Friuli

21 September 1986 2	Juventus	3–0	Avellino	Turin
	Manfredonia 27'; Cabrini 42'; Platini 65'	Report		Stadium: Comunale

28 September 1986 3	Empoli	0–1	Juventus	Florence
		Report	Brio 72'	Stadium: Comunale; Referee: Maurizio Mattei

5 October 1986 4	Juventus	0–0	Milan	Turin
		Report		Stadium: Comunale

12 October 1986 5	Fiorentina	1–1	Juventus	Florence
	Díaz 10'	Report	Vignola 58'	Stadium: Comunale

19 October 1986 6	Ascoli	0–5	Juventus	Ascoli Piceno
		Report	Briaschi 24', 62'; Buso 70'; Bonetti 72'; Platini 80'	Stadium: Cino e Lillo Del Duca

26 October 1986 7	Juventus	1–1	Internazionale	Turin
	Ferri 8' (o.g.)	Report	Altobelli 49'	Stadium: Comunale

2 November 1986 8	Como	0–0	Juventus	Como
		Report		Stadium: Giuseppe Sinigaglia

9 November 1986 9	Juventus	1–3	Napoli	Turin
	Platini 50'	Report	Ferrario 73'; Giordano 74'; Volpecina 90'	Stadium: Comunale

23 November 1986 10	Juventus	2–0	Atalanta	Turin
	Bonini 7'; Serena 82'	Report		Stadium: Comunale

30 November 1986 11	Roma	3–0	Juventus	Rome
	Berggreen 39'; Desideri 41'; Giannini 75'	Report		Stadium: Olimpico

14 December 1986 12	Juventus	1–0	Torino	Turin
	Manfredonia 78'	Report		Stadium: Comunale

21 December 1986 13	Sampdoria	4–1	Juventus	Genoa
	Vialli 63', 87'; Mancini 70'; Briegel 81'	Report	Serena 71'	Stadium: Luigi Ferraris

4 January 1987 14	Juventus	2–1	Verona	Turin
	Manfredonia 67'; Cabrini 88'	Report	Elkjær 28'	Stadium: Comunale

11 January 1987 15	Brescia	0–0	Juventus	Brescia
		Report		Stadium: Mario Rigamonti

18 January 1987 16	Juventus	2–1	Udinese	Turin
	Laudrup 12'; Miano 70' (o.g.)	Report	Graziani 24'	Stadium: Comunale

1 February 1987 17	Avellino	1–1	Juventus	Avellino
	Bertoni 55'	Report	Mauro 61'	Stadium: Partenio

8 February 1987 18	Juventus	3–0	Empoli	Turin
	Serena 3', 5'; Cabrini 78'	Report		Stadium: Comunale

22 February 1987 19	Milan	1–1	Juventus	Milan
	Virdis 74'	Report	Serena 55'	Stadium: San Siro

1 March 1987 20	Juventus	1–0	Fiorentina	Turin
	Cabrini 54'	Report		Stadium: Comunale

8 March 1987 21	Juventus	2–2	Ascoli	Turin
	Benedetti 20' (o.g.); Laudrup 34'	Report	Caricola 44'; Pusceddu 51'	Stadium: Comunale

15 March 1987 22	Internazionale	2–1	Juventus	Milan
	Fanna 42'; Garlini 75'	Report	88' Serena	Stadium: Giuseppe Meazza

22 March 1987 23	Juventus	1–0	Como	Turin
	Manfredonia 9'	Report		Stadium: Comunale

29 March 1987 24	Napoli	2–1	Juventus	Naples
	Renica 14'; Romano 58'	Report	Serena 50'	Stadium: San Paolo

5 April 1987 25	Atalanta	0–0	Juventus	Bergamo
		Report		Stadium: Comunale

12 April 1987 26	Juventus	2–0	Roma	Turin
	Serena 6'; Briaschi 67'	Report		Stadium: Comunale

26 April 1987 27	Torino	1–1	Juventus	Turin
	Cravero 86'	Report	Brio 56'	Stadium: Comunale

3 May 1987 28	Juventus	2–1	Sampdoria	Turin
	Manfredonia 49'; Serena 56'	Report	Vialli 71'	Stadium: Comunale

10 May 1987 29	Verona	1–1	Juventus	Verona
	Elkjær 68' (pen.)	Report	Manfredonia 74'	Stadium: Marcantonio Bentegodi

17 May 1987 30	Juventus	3–2	Brescia	Turin
	Serena 4'; Brio 22'; Bonetti 78'	Report	Gritti 6'; Iorio 41'	Stadium: Comunale

=== Coppa Italia ===
==== Group stage ====
Pos	Team	Pld	W	D	L	GF	GA	GD	Pts
1	Juventus	5	4	0	1	10	3	+7	8
2	Cremonese	5	3	1	1	8	2	+6	7
3	Sampdoria	5	3	1	1	5	3	+2	7
4	Lecce	5	1	1	3	3	5	−2	3
5	Monza	5	1	1	3	2	7	−5	3
6	Reggiana	5	0	2	3	2	10	−8	2

24 August 1986	Lecce	0–2	Juventus	Lecce
			Serena 12'; Serena 34'	Stadium: Stadio Via del Mare; Referee: Mattei

27 August 1986	Monza	0–1	Juventus	Milan
			22' Briaschi	Stadium: Stadio Giuseppe Meazza; Referee: Coppetelli

31 August 1986	Juventus	4–1	Reggiana	Turin
	Laudrup 5'; Serena 6', 57'; Manfredonia 37'		55' (pen.) Tavaglione	Stadium: Comunale; Referee: Baldas

3 September 1986	Juventus	2–0	Cremonese	Turin
	Manfredonia 45'; Torri 73' (o.g.)			Stadium: Stadio Comunale Vittorio Pozzo; Referee: Leni

7 September 1986	Sampdoria	2–1	Juventus	Genoa
	Vialli 1'; Mannini 21'		41' Scirea	Stadium: Stadio Luigi Ferraris; Referee: Pezzella

==== Knockout stage ====
Eightfinals

25 February 1987	Juventus	0–0	Lazio	Turin
				Stadium: Comunale; Referee: Paparesta

8 April 1987	Lazio	0–2	Juventus	Rome
			70' Buso; 78' Serena	Stadium: Olimpico; Referee: Mattei

Quarterfinals

29 April 1987	Cagliari	1–1	Juventus	Cagliari
	Marchi 31'		37' Vignola	Stadium: Stadio Sant'Elia; Referee: Longhi

6 May 1987	Juventus	2–2	Cagliari	Turin
	Soldà 33'; Platini 60'		27' Bergamaschi; 83' Piras	Stadium: Comunale; Referee: Sguizzato

=== European Cup ===
==== First round ====
17 September 1986 1	Juventus (Italy)	7–0	(Iceland) Valur	Turin, Italy
	Laudrup 19'; Laudrup 22'; Serena 43'; Cabrini 60'; Laudrup 65'; Vignola 77'; Briaschi 78'			Stadium: Stadio Olimpico di Torino; Attendance: 25,000; Referee: Edgar Azzopardi (Malta)

1 October 1986 2	Valur (Iceland)	0–4 (0–11 agg.)	(Italy) Juventus	Reykjavík, Iceland
			Platini 10', 86'; Laudrup 31', 36'	Stadium: Laugardalsvöllur; Attendance: 5,500; Referee: Ib Nielsen (Denmark)

==== Second round ====
22 October 1986 1	Real Madrid (Spain)	1–0	(Italy) Juventus	Madrid, Spain
	Butragueño 21'			Stadium: Santiago Bernabéu Stadium; Attendance: 100,000; Referee: Bob Valentine (Scotland)

5 November 1986 2	Juventus (Italy)	1–0 (a.e.t.) (1–1 agg.) (1–3 p)	(Spain) Real Madrid	Turin, Italy
	Cabrini 9'			Stadium: Stadio Olimpico di Torino; Attendance: 62,000; Referee: Dieter Pauly (Germany)
	Penalties
	Brio (penalty missed); Vignola (penalty scored); Manfredonia (penalty missed); Favero (penalty missed)		(penalty missed) Sánchez; (penalty scored) Butragueño; (penalty scored) Valdano; (penalty scored) Juanito

== Statistics ==
=== Players statistics ===
No.	Pos	Nat	Player	Total		Serie A		Coppa		European Cup	
No.	Pos	Nat	Player	Apps	Goals	Apps	Goals	Apps	Goals	Apps	Goals
	GK	(Italy) ITA	Stefano Tacconi	43	-34	30	-27	9	-6	4	-1
	DF	(Italy) ITA	Luciano Favero	43	0	30	0	9	0	4	0
	DF	(Italy) ITA	Sergio Brio	40	4	28	4	9	0	3	0
	DF	(Italy) ITA	Gaetano Scirea	29	1	21	0	7	1	1	0
	DF	(Italy) ITA	Antonio Cabrini	26	6	17	4	6	0	3	2
	MF	(Italy) ITA	Massimo Mauro	41	1	28+1	1	8	0	4	0
	MF	(San Marino) SMR	Massimo Bonini	35	1	26	1	7	0	2	0
	MF	(France) FRA	Michel Platini	41	5	29	2	8	1	4	2
	MF	(Italy) ITA	Lionello Manfredonia	41	9	28	7	9	2	4	0
	FW	(Denmark) DEN	Michael Laudrup	30	9	19+1	3	6	1	4	5
	FW	(Italy) ITA	Aldo Serena	36	15	26	10	8	4	2	1
	GK	(Italy) ITA	Luciano Bodini	0	0	0	-0	0	-0	0	-0
	MF	(Italy) ITA	Nicola Caricola	27	0	17+4	0	3	0	3	0
	DF	(Italy) ITA	Roberto Solda	27	2	11+5	0	8	2	3	0
	FW	(Italy) ITA	Renato Buso	18	2	10+4	1	4	1	0	0
	FW	(Italy) ITA	Massimo Briaschi	26	5	4+9	3	9	1	4	1
	DF	(Italy) ITA	Stefano Pioli	11	0	3+4	0	3	0	1	0
	MF	(Italy) ITA	Beniamino Vignola	25	3	2+13	1	7	1	3	1
	MF	(Italy) ITA	Ivano Bonetti	23	2	1+15	2	5	0	2	0
	MF	(Italy) ITA	Marco Bruzzano	1	0	0+1	0				
	GK	(Italy) ITA	Paolo Mulato	0	0	0	0				
	DF	(Italy) ITA	Stefano Lo Porto	0	0	0	0				

- Source: http://calcio-seriea.net/presenze/1986/945/
