= Michele De Agostini =

Italian footballer

Personal information
- Date of birth: 27 November 1983 (age 42)
- Place of birth: Udine, Italy
- Height: 1.80 m (5 ft 11 in)
- Position: Defender

Senior career*
Years	Team	Apps	(Gls)
2006	Triestina	4	(0)
2006–2007	Pro Patria	14	(0)
2007–2014	Prato	193	(12)
2014–2015	Ischia	14	(0)
2015	Prato	15	(0)
2015–2020	Pordenone	150	(12)
2020–2021	Cjarlins Muzane	25	(5)
- * Club domestic league appearances and goals

Michele De Agostini (born 27 November 1983) is an Italian former footballer who played as a defender.

== Club career ==
He made his professional debut in the 2005–06 season in Serie B with Triestina. He played the next 14 seasons of his career in third and fourth tier, before returning to Serie B with Pordenone for the 2019–20 season at the age of 35.

On 29 August 2020 he left the Neroverdi.

On 17 September 2020 he joined Serie D club Cjarlins Muzane.

== Personal life ==
His father Luigi De Agostini was an Italian international footballer, won UEFA Cup with Juventus and played at the 1990 FIFA World Cup where Italy finished third.
