= Michele Magrin =

Italian footballer (born 1985)

Personal information
- Date of birth: 6 November 1985 (age 41)
- Place of birth: Bergamo, Italy
- Height: 1.73 m (5 ft 8 in)
- Position: Midfielder

Youth career
- 1997–2003: Atalanta

Senior career*
Years	Team	Apps	(Gls)
2003–2007	Atalanta	0	(0)
2004–2006	→ Monza (loan)	36	(0)
2007	→ Pro Vercelli (loan)	13	(0)
2007–2009	Pro Vercelli	60	(0)
2009–2010	Pro Sesto	23	(0)
2010–2012	Seregno	58	(5)
2012–2013	Caravaggio	25	(3)
2013–2015	Seregno	62	(8)
2015–2016	Sporting Bellinzago	26	(3)
2016–2017	Virtus Bergamo	33	(0)
2017	Varese	10	(0)
2017–2018	Sanremese	10	(0)
2018–2019	Crema	24	(1)
2019–2020	Breno	23	(0)
Total		403	(20)
- * Club domestic league appearances and goals

Michele Magrin (born 6 November 1985) is an Italian former professional footballer who played as a midfielder.

== Career ==
A youth product of local club Atalanta, having joined in 1997, Magrin moved to Monza in 2004, helping them gain promotion to Serie C1. He joined Serie C2 outfit Pro Vercelli in January 2007, playing three seasons, before moving to Pro Sesto, also in Serie C2, in 2009.

From 2010 to his retirement in 2020, Magrin played in the Serie D, for Seregno, Caravaggio, Sporting Bellinzago, Virtus Bergamo, Varese, Sanremese, Crema and Breno.

== Personal life ==
Magrin's father, Marino, was also a professional footballer, having mostly played for Atalanta.

A singer in his free time, Magrin began aged 14. He formed the band "Amusia", and composed Monza's official club anthem "Monza Alè" in 2006.
