= Luigi De Agostini =

Italian footballer (born 1961)

Personal information
- Full name: Luigi De Agostini
- Date of birth: 7 April 1961 (age 65)
- Place of birth: Udine, Italy
- Height: 1.74 m (5 ft 9 in)
- Positions: Left-back; centre-back; midfielder

Senior career*
Years	Team	Apps	(Gls)
1978–1982	Udinese	7	(0)
1981	Trento	28	(3)
1982–1983	Catanzaro	24	(4)
1983–1986	Udinese	80	(3)
1986–1987	Hellas Verona	30	(3)
1987–1992	Juventus	146	(20)
1992–1993	Internazionale	31	(1)
1993–1995	Reggiana	61	(2)
Total		402	(36)

International career
1987–1991	Italy	36	(4)
Medal record
Men's football
Representing Italy
FIFA World Cup
Third place	1990 Italy
- * Club domestic league appearances and goals

Luigi De Agostini Cavaliere OMRI (Italian pronunciation: [luˈiːdʒi de aɡoˈstiːni]; born 7 April 1961) is an Italian former professional footballer. He played as a defender, primarily in the role of an attacking full-back or winger on the left flank, although he was also capable of playing in several other positions both in defence and in midfield. He represented the Italy national team at UEFA Euro 1988 and the 1990 FIFA World Cup.

== Club career ==
De Agostini was born in Udine. His professional career began with his hometown club, Udinese, making his debut in a 0–0 draw against Napoli on 23 March 1980. He was rarely played during his time at the club, forcing him to move to Serie C1 for Trento for a year. He was immediately back in the Serie A next year, however this time for Catanzaro before he moved back to Udinese, this time much more prominent. In 1986, he was signed on for Hellas Verona, though it would only be the following year that he would achieve his greatest success, signing with Juventus in 1987.

During his five-year stay with Juventus, as well as taking on his usual defensive role, he was also often employed as a box-to-box midfielder, due to his offensive and defensive work-rate and contribution. Despite his defensive style of play, he was awarded the coveted number 10 shirt, following Michel Platini's retirement. With the club, he won both the Coppa Italia and the UEFA Cup during the 1989–90 season. He scored for Juventus as they beat rivals Fiorentina in the 1990 UEFA Cup Final. Despite being an accurate penalty taker, he is also remembered for missing a penalty against Fiorentina the following season, after Roberto Baggio had refused to take a penalty against his former club. With Juventus, he managed 28 goals in 217 appearances.

After his time with Juventus, Luigi moved to Inter Milan for a year, then transferred to Reggiana in 1993, ending his professional career after two seasons with the club. In total, over his 15 seasons of his professional career, he made 378 appearances in Serie A, scoring 33 goals.

== International career ==
During his time with Juventus, De Agostini achieved his first senior international cap in a 0–0 draw against Norway on 28 May 1987. With Italy, he participated in Euro '88, scoring against Denmark, as Italy went on to reach the semi-finals. He also took part in Italy's footballing campaign at the 1988 Summer Olympics, where they managed a fourth-place finish after reaching the semi-finals yet again. He was also a substitute member of Italy's squad at the 1990 World Cup on home soil, where the team also managed to reach the semi-finals, only to suffer a penalty-shootout defeat to defending champions Argentina, following a 1–1 draw after extra-time; despite the loss, De Agostini was able to net his penalty in the shoot-out. Italy subsequently went on to capture the bronze medal following a 2–1 victory over England in the third-place match. Under manager Azeglio Vicini, he was also often deployed as a wide midfielder or as a wing-back, in addition to his more regular full-back role. Unfortunately, his time with Juventus also included his last game for the Italy national team on 25 September 1991 in a 2–1 home loss to Bulgaria. In total he made 36 appearances for Italy, scoring 4 goals.

== Style of play ==
De Agostini was a tactically versatile and hard-working defender, who could play on the left, or even in the centre of his team's defensive line, although he was capable of playing anywhere along the left side of the pitch, due to his ability to cover the flank effectively and assist his team both offensively and defensively. He started out as a forward, but he was primarily deployed in the role of an attacking left-back or wing-back throughout his career, due to his pace, stamina, marking, crossing, positional sense, technical ability, and his capacity to read the game. He was also capable of playing anywhere in midfield, and was frequently used on the left wing, as well as in the centre on occasion, either in a box-to-box role as a mezzala, or even as a defensive midfielder, due to his anticipation and tenacious style of play. In addition to his defensive attributes, De Agostini was known for his eye for goal and striking ability from distance, and was also an accurate free kick and penalty taker; with 33 goals in Serie A, he is one of the league's most prolific defenders ever. Beyond his playing ability, he also stood out for his professionalism throughout his career.

== After retirement ==
After retiring, De Agostini worked as a team manager for his former club, Udinese, between 2007 and 2009. His job entailed acting as a middleman between the team's manager, Giovanni Galeone, and the squad of players. He now dedicates himself to training young Italian football players. He initially worked as a youth coach for several clubs, including Udinese, Milan, Real Madrid, and Juventus, and was in charge of running their youth camps in Italy; he later started his own football school for young players in Friuli, called the De Agostini Academy.

== Personal life ==
De Agostini's son, Michele, was also a professional footballer mainly playing in the lower leagues of Italy.

== Career statistics ==
=== International ===
Scores and results list Italy's goal tally first, score column indicates score after each Agostini goal.

List of international goals scored by Luigi De Agostini
No.	Date	Venue	Opponent	Score	Result	Competition	Ref.
1	5 December 1987	San Siro, Milan, Italy	Portugal	3–0	3–0	UEFA Euro 1988 qualification	
2	27 April 1988	Stade Municipal, Luxembourg City, Luxembourg	Luxembourg	3–0	3–0	Friendly	
3	17 June 1988	Müngersdorfer Stadion, Cologne, Germany	Denmark	2–0	2–0	UEFA Euro 1988	
4	31 March 1990	St. Jakob-Park, Basel, Switzerland	Switzerland	1–0	1–0	Friendly	

== Honours ==
Udinese Primavera

- Primavera: 1980–81

Udinese

- Mitropa Cup: 1979–80
- Serie B: 1978–79

Juventus

- Coppa Italia: 1989–90
- UEFA Cup: 1989–90

Italy

- FIFA World Cup third place: 1990
- Scania 100 Tournament: 1991

=== Orders ===

5th Class/Knight: Cavaliere Ordine al Merito della Repubblica Italiana: 1991
