= Marino Magrin =

Italian footballer

Personal information
- Date of birth: 13 September 1959 (age 67)
- Place of birth: Borso del Grappa, Italy
- Height: 1.77 m (5 ft 9 1/2 in)
- Position: Attacking midfielder

Senior career*
Years	Team	Apps	(Gls)
1975–1978	Bassano Virtus	7	(3)
1978–1980	Montebelluna	57	(14)
1980–1981	Mantova	27	(1)
1981–1987	Atalanta	192	(38)
1987–1989	Juventus	44	(7)
1989–1992	Verona	74	(3)
1992–1993	Bassano Virtus	14	(4)

International career
1987	Italy Olympic	3	(0)
- * Club domestic league appearances and goals

Marino Magrin (born 13 September 1959) is an Italian former professional footballer who played as an attacking midfielder.

== Club career ==
Born in Borso del Grappa, Magrin began his career with Serie D Bassano Virtus in 1975. He moved to Montebelluna in 1978, where he remained for two seasons. In 1980, he moved to Serie C1 side Mantova, where he remained for one season before moving to newly relegated side Atalanta in 1981. His performances and leadership soon helped the club to achieve Serie A promotion, winning the Serie C title in 1982, and the Serie B title in 1984, in the process. Magrin made his Serie A debut with Atalanta during the 1984–85 season, and later helped the club to the Coppa Italia Final in 1987, where they were defeated by domestic double winners Napoli; in total, he scored 40 goals for Atalanta in 192 appearances.

Magrin was acquired by Juventus FC in 1987, as a replacement for Michel Platini in the midfield playmaker role, following the Frenchman's retirement, but decided not to take Platini's number 10 shirt (although he still occasionally wore the iconic jersey), as the club president Giampiero Boniperti advised him to take his own number 8 shirt instead, which had also previously belonged to Marco Tardelli, as a sign of respect and humility. Magrin himself was rather modest about his new role and brushed off comparisons with the Juventus legend. The two seasons he spent with the club were not successful for Juventus, however, due to the club's post-Trapattoni crisis under new manager Rino Marchesi; although he often started in his first season, his second season saw him relegated to the bench with greater frequency, and he subsequently left for Hellas Verona F.C. in 1989. He spent three seasons with the club under manager Osvaldo Bagnoli, before moving back to Bassano Virtus, the club with which he began his career, in 1992, retiring in 1993, after one season.

== International career ==
Although he never represented Italy at the senior level, Magrin made 3 appearances for the Italian Olympic squad in 1987.

== Style of play ==
A creative, technically gifted, and hard-working, right-footed, advanced midfield playmaker, Magrin was usually deployed as an attacking midfielder, or as a winger or central midfielder, and was capable of both scoring and creating goals. Despite his talent in his youth, which even led Platini to say "he's better than me", his career was marked by inconsistency and he failed to live up to his initial potential. Magrin was known in particular for being a penalty-kick specialist and for his incredible accuracy on set-pieces, as well as his use of the bending "knuckleball" technique on free kicks.

== Personal life ==
Magrin's son, Michele, was also a professional footballer.

== Honours ==
Atalanta

- Serie C1: 1981–82
- Serie B: 1983–84
