= Massimo Bonini =

Sammarinese football player and coach (born 1959)

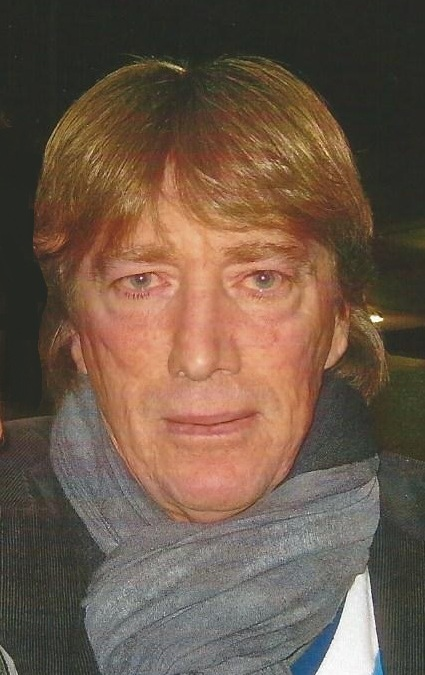
- Bonini in 2011

Personal information
- Date of birth: 13 October 1959 (age 67)
- Place of birth: San Marino, San Marino
- Height: 1.78 m (5 ft 10 in)
- Position: Defensive midfielder

Youth career
- 1973–1977: Juvenes

Senior career*
Years	Team	Apps	(Gls)
1977–1978	Bellaria Igea	33	(1)
1978–1979	Forlì	23	(1)
1979–1981	Cesena	60	(5)
1981–1989	Juventus	192	(5)
1989–1992	Bologna	96	(4)

International career
1980–1983	Italy U21	9	(0)
1990–1995	San Marino	19	(0)

Managerial career
- 1996–1998: San Marino
- * Club domestic league appearances and goals

Massimo Bonini (born 13 October 1959) is a Sanmarinese former professional football player and coach who played as a midfielder for Italian sides Bellaria Igea, Forlì, Cesena, Juventus, and Bologna. His greatest achievements in club football were at Juventus, where his workrate enabled him to form a notable midfield partnership with Michel Platini and Marco Tardelli, having won three Scudetti, one Italian Cup, one European Cup, one Cup Winners' Cup, one European Super Cup, and one Intercontinental Cup, becoming the first and only Sanmarinese footballer to win a UEFA club competition. At the international level, he gained 19 caps for the San Marino national football team.

Widely regarded as the best Sanmarinese player of all time, Bonini is one of the few sportspeople from his country to have won a world title, alongside motorcyclist Manuel Poggiali, jumper Elisabetta Rossi, and fisherman Marino Michelotti. For its 50th anniversary in 2004, UEFA asked each of its then 52 member associations to nominate one player as the single most outstanding player of the period 1954–2003, and Bonini was chosen as the Golden Player of San Marino by the San Marino Football Federation in November 2003.

== Club career ==
Bonini began his career at Juvenes Dogana in 1973 but failed to make a league appearance during his 4 years at the club. After leaving Juvenes Dogana in 1977, he moved on to join Bellaria, going on to make 33 appearances scoring 1 goal. After leaving Bellaria in 1978, he moved on to join Forli, going on to make 23 appearances, scoring 1 goal. After leaving Forli in 1979, he moved to Cesena, appearing 60 times and scoring 5 goals.

After leaving Cesena in 1981, Bonini played for Juventus between 1981 and 1988, in which he played 296 matches and scored 6 goals. He won three Serie A titles, the 1982–83 Coppa Italia , the 1983–84 European Cup Winners' Cup, the 1984–85 European Cup, the 1984 European Super Cup, and the 1985 Intercontinental Cup. He is the only Sammarinese footballer to have won an official international title. For his performances, he was awarded the Bravo Award in 1983, as the best under-23 player in European Competitions. After leaving Juventus in 1988, he moved to Bologna going on to make 112 appearances and scoring 5 goals. Bonini retired in 1993.

== International career ==
Since the San Marino Football Federation was not officially recognised by the UEFA until 1990, players from San Marino were assimilated to Italian players. For this reason, Bonini was entitled to play for the Italian Football Federation and actually played for the Italian Under-21 football team. Since he always refused to give up the citizenship of San Marino, he had to wait until 1990 in order to play for San Marino's first team, winning 19 full caps since then. He played his first match for San Marino against Switzerland on 14 November 1990.

== Managerial career ==
After his retirement, Bonini briefly served as the head coach of the San Marino national football team, from 2 June 1996 to 10 September 1997.

== Style of play ==
Bonini was a hardworking, energetic and versatile box-to-box midfielder, who was frequently deployed as a central midfielder or as a defensive midfielder during his time at Juventus. Although this position did not provide him with the freedom to contribute offensively or creatively that he had possessed in his early career, he excelled in his new role as a ball winner, and at breaking down opposition plays due to his tactical intelligence, workrate, and positional sense, supporting his more creative teammates defensively, such as Michel Platini (the playmaker), alongside Marco Tardelli (a mezzala). He was known in particular for his pace and stamina, which earned him the nickname "Platini's lungs" due to his successful partnership in midfield with the Frenchman.

== Career statistics ==
=== Club ===
Appearances and goals by club, season and competition
Club	Season	League			Coppa Italia		League Cup		Europe		Total	
Club	Season	Division	Apps	Goals	Apps	Goals	Apps	Goals	Apps	Goals	Apps	Goals

== Honours ==
Juventus

- Serie A: 1981–82, 1983–84, 1985–86
- Coppa Italia: 1982–83
- European Cup: 1984–85
- European Cup Winners' Cup: 1983–84
- European Super Cup: 1984
- Intercontinental Cup: 1985

Individual

- Bravo Award: 1983
- UEFA Jubilee Awards Golden Player of San Marino: 2004
- Medaglia d'oro al valore atletico CONS: 1989
- FIFA Centennial Golden Medal: 2005
