= Massimo Mauro =

Italian footballer & politician (born 1962)

Personal information
- Date of birth: 24 May 1962 (age 64)
- Place of birth: Catanzaro, Italy
- Height: 1.79 m (5 ft 10 1/2 in)
- Position: Midfielder

Senior career*
Years	Team	Apps	(Gls)
1979–1982	Catanzaro	58	(1)
1982–1985	Udinese	83	(8)
1985–1989	Juventus	102	(3)
1989–1993	Napoli	64	(2)
Total		307	(14)
- * Club domestic league appearances and goals

Massimo Mauro (born 24 May 1962) is an Italian politician and a former professional football player, who played as a midfielder. A hard working and tactically intelligent team-player, throughout his career, he was known in particular for his technique and crossing ability on the right-flank. Despite not being particularly quick, due to his stocky physique, he was able to excel in this position due to his vision and positional sense, as well as his control and strength, which allowed him to hold up the ball for teammates. His brother Gregorio also played football professionally.

== Club career ==
Born in Catanzaro, Mauro began his playing with local side Catanzaro in 1979. He made his Serie A debut with Catanzaro on 27 April 1980, in a 3–0 home defeat to A.C. Milan; he remained there until 1982. He then went on to play with Udinese (1982–85), Juventus (1985–1989), and Napoli (1989–1993), before retiring from professional football in 1993 due to back problems at the age of 31. During his club career he won the scudetto twice, once with Juventus in 1986, and once with Napoli in 1990, as well as an Intercontinental Cup with Juventus in 1985, and the Supercoppa Italiana with Napoli in 1990. During his club career, Mauro was able to play alongside three of the greatest footballers of the 80s: Zico (with Udinese), Michel Platini (with Juventus), and Diego Armando Maradona (with Napoli).

== International career ==
Although he was never capped for Italy at senior level during his career, he represented the Italy national under-21 football team on 17 occasions between 1980 and 1984, scoring a goal; he took part at the 1982 and 1984 UEFA European Under-21 Championships with the under-21 side, reaching the semi-final of the tournament in 1984. He also represented Italy at the 1988 Summer Olympics, where they finished in fourth place after reaching the semi-final.

== Post-playing career ==
In 1996, he entered into politics, being elected in Calabria to Italian Chamber of Deputies as The Olive Tree coalition candidate. From 1997 to 1999 he also served as chairman of football club Genoa. In May 2006 he was elected city councillor of Turin, and is currently a registered member of the centre-left Democratic Party.

He is currently working as a football commentator for Sky Sport in Italy, and collaborates with the Italian newspaper La Repubblica. Mauro also founded a charitable foundation together with Gianluca Vialli in order to raise funds for research into cancer and amyotrophic lateral sclerosis (ALS).

== Controversy ==
On 23 November 2014, after Napoli-Cagliari 3–3, Mauro poked Cagliari's manager Zdeněk Zeman, insinuating that his teams lack balance, something that clashes with the fact that, in Italy, winning teams are those which concede less goals. Zeman, largely known for his hyper-attacking style of play, silenced Mauro, on the one hand, stating that "if you score one goal more than the opponent, you don't care about conceded goals", on the other, reminding the journalist of his Lazio side finishing second with the best defence during the 1994–95 Serie A season, during which Lazio finished in joint-second place behind Juventus alongside Parma. Funnily enough, in spite of a speechless Mauro, Lazio conceded 34 goals in the aforementioned Serie A campaign, as many as Inter, and more than Roma (25), Parma (31), Juventus (32) and Milan (32).

== Honours ==
=== Player ===
==== Club ====
Juventus

- Serie A: 1985–86
- Intercontinental Cup: 1985

Napoli

- Serie A: 1989–90
- Supercoppa Italiana: 1990
