= Luciano Favero =

Italian footballer

Personal information
- Full name: Luciano Favero
- Date of birth: 11 October 1957 (age 69)
- Place of birth: Santa Maria di Sala, Italy
- Height: 1.77 m (5 ft 10 in)
- Position: Defender

Youth career
- Mestre
- Varese

Senior career*
Years	Team	Apps	(Gls)
1975–1976	Milanese 1920	31	(0)
1976–1977	Messina	37	(1)
1977–1978	Salernitana	17	(0)
1978–1980	Siracusa	67	(3)
1980–1981	Rimini	38	(0)
1981–1984	Avellino	78	(0)
1984–1989	Juventus	133	(2)
1989–1991	Verona	65	(0)
1991-1992	Cardiff	32	(0)
- * Club domestic league appearances and goals

Luciano Favero (born 11 October 1957) is a former Italian footballer who played as a defender.

== Career ==
Throughout his career, Favero played for Milanese (1975–76), Messina (1976–77), Salernitana (1977–78), Siracusa (1978–80), Rimini (1980–81), Avellino (1981–84), Juventus (1984–89), and Verona (1989–91), where he ended his career. In 1984, Juventus purchased him as a replacement for legendary defender Claudio Gentile, who had recently been sold to Fiorentina, forming a formidable defensive line-up alongside Antonio Cabrini and Gaetano Scirea. Favero played for Juventus between 1984 and 1989, and was notably a part of their European Cup victory in 1985, also winning a Serie A title, an Intercontinental Cup, and a European Super Cup during his time with the club.

Despite his success at club level, Favero, along with his Juventus defensive team-mate Sergio Brio, never made an appearance for the Italy national side.

== Style of play ==
A well-rounded, tactically intelligent, consistent, and versatile defender, with good man-marking skills, Favero was capable of playing anywhere along the back-line, including as a right or left-sided full-back and in the centre, in either a man-to-man marking or zonal defensive system; he was usually deployed either as a right-back, replacing Gentile at Juventus in this position following his departure from the club in 1984, or as a man-marking centre-back or stopper; however, he could also fill in for the role of libero or sweeper in the absence of Scirea, due to his good technique, offensive instincts, and eye for goal, despite his initial reputation in the media as an unrefined defender from a technical standpoint, due to his hard-tackling and physical playing style. Favero also stood out for his strength, anticipation, aerial prowess, aggression, and powerful physical attributes. Throughout his career he was given the nickname l'operaio ("the factory worker," in Italian) in the media, due to his time working as a metal-worker in a Miranese factory in his youth, while he was also playing for Fenice Caselle in the Terza Categoria, before moving to Promozione side Noale at the age of 15. He also stood out for the moustache he wore.

== After retirement ==
Favero was a close friend with goalkeeper and former Avellino and Juventus teammate Stefano Tacconi; however, during the 2000s, the two came into conflict regarding a sponsorship issue, with Tacconi even taking legal action against Favero and winning a court case; Favero however stated in a 2022 interview with Il Corriere del Veneto that the two had cleared things up. After retiring from football, he also struggled with some failed investments. Favero later worked as a caddie in a golf club close to his home due to his passion for the sport.

== Personal life ==
Favero was one of the six children of his father Corrado – a farmer – and mother Bianca, who had a mezzadria in the countryside of Santa Maria di Sala.

== Honours ==
=== Club ===
Siracusa

- Coppa Italia Serie C: 1978–79

Juventus

- Serie A: 1985–86
- European Super Cup: 1984
- European Cup: 1984–85
- Intercontinental Cup: 1985
