= Lionello Manfredonia =

Italian footballer

Personal information
- Full name: Lionello Manfredonia
- Date of birth: 27 November 1956 (age 69)
- Place of birth: Rome, Italy
- Height: 1.82 m (6 ft 0 in)
- Positions: Defender; midfielder

Team information
- Current team: Brescia (head of youth)

Youth career
- 1971–1975: Lazio

Senior career*
Years	Team	Apps	(Gls)
1975–1985	Lazio	201	(8)
1985–1987	Juventus	51	(7)
1987–1989	Roma	73	(4)
Total		325	(19)

International career
1976–1977	Italy U-21	9	(1)
1977–1978	Italy	4	(0)

Managerial career
- 2015–: Brescia (head of youth)
- * Club domestic league appearances and goals

Lionello Manfredonia (Italian pronunciation: [ljoˈnɛllo maɱfreˈdɔːnja; li.o-]; born 27 November 1956 in Rome) is an Italian former footballer who played as a defender or midfielder. He is currently the leader of the youth sector at Brescia.

== Club career ==
During his club career, Manfredonia played for Italian sides Lazio (1975–85), Juventus (1985–87) and Roma (1987–89), totalling 289 appearances and 15 goals in Serie A. Along with his Lazio teammates, he was found guilty of being involved in the Totonero 1980 match-fixing scandal, and was banned for three years, while Lazio were relegated to Serie B. During his final season with Roma, on 30 December 1989, in an away match against Bologna, played at freezing temperatures (-5 degrees), Manfredonia collapsed after suffering a heart attack; his former Lazio teammate Bruno Giordano was the first to aid him. Although Manfredonia later managed a full recovery, he subsequently retired from football at the age of 33.

== International career ==
Manfredonia also played four times for the Italy national football team between 1977 and 1978, making his senior international debut in a 3–0 win over Luxembourg on 3 December 1977. He was a member of the 1978 FIFA World Cup squad that managed a fourth-place finish in the tournament.

== Style of play ==
He was an athletic, tenacious, versatile, and hard-working player, with good technique, Manfredonia usually played as a defender, either as a sweeper, or as a man-marking centre-back (stopper); he was also capable of playing as a ball-winner in midfield, functioning as a central or defensive midfielder, or even on the left, on occasion.

== Honours ==
=== Club ===
Juventus

- Serie A: 1985–86
- Intercontinental Cup: 1985
