= Luciano Bodini =

Italian footballer

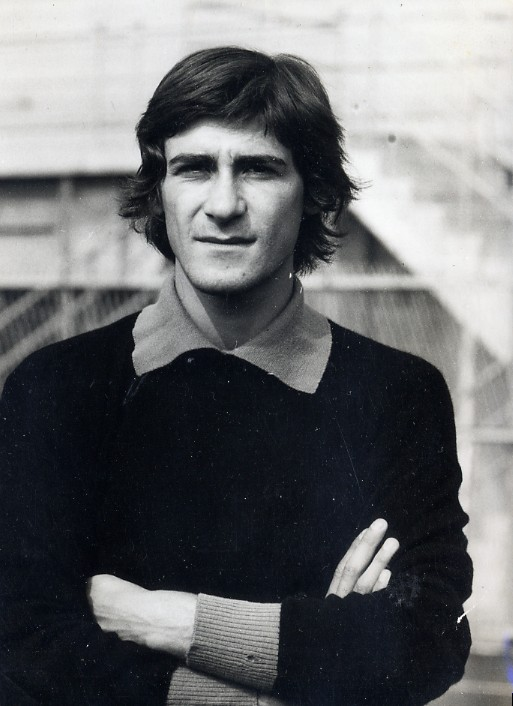

Personal information
- Date of birth: 12 February 1954 (age 72)
- Place of birth: Leno, Italy
- Height: 1.78 m (5 ft 10 in)
- Position: Goalkeeper

Senior career*
Years	Team	Apps	(Gls)
1974–1977	Cremonese	108	(0)
1977–1979	Atalanta	32	(0)
1979–1989	Juventus	26	(0)
1989–1990	Verona	6	(0)
1990–1991	Internazionale	0	(0)
- * Club domestic league appearances and goals

Luciano Bodini (born 12 February 1954, in Leno) is a retired Italian professional football player, who played in the position of goalkeeper.

== Career ==
Bodini began his career with Cremonese (1974–77), before moving to Atalanta (1977–79), where he managed to gain a place in the team's starting line-up despite initial competition from Pierluigi Pizzaballa. He later also played with Juventus (1979–89), Verona (1989–90), and Inter (1990–91).

According to some sources, he is among the few players to have won all three major UEFA-organised club competitions. He was able to accomplish this feat during his time with Juventus between 1979 and 1989 (where he served mainly as the understudies of Dino Zoff and subsequently Stefano Tacconi, although he briefly was able to break into the Juventus starting line-up due to his excellent performances), and with Inter, during the final season of his career, serving as a backup to Walter Zenga. Because of this, he was often known by the nickname: "the best reserve goalkeeper in Italy".

== Style of play ==
Despite his relatively small stature for a goalkeeper, Bodini stood out for the consistency of his performances throughout his career. A well-rounded keeper, he was equally known for his ability to come out and handle crosses, as well as his adeptness at rushing off his line or getting to ground quickly to parry shots.

== Honours ==
=== Club ===
Juventus

- Serie A champion: 1980–81, 1981–82, 1983–84, 1985–86 (on the roster, but did not play any league games except for the 1983–84 and 1985–86 seasons).
- Coppa Italia winner: 1982–83.
- European Cup winner: 1984–85.
- UEFA Super Cup winner: 1984.
- Intercontinental Cup winner: 1985.
