= Michel Platini =

French football administrator and player (born 1955)

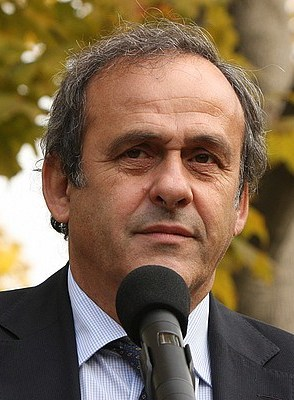
- Platini in 2010

6th President of UEFA
- In office 26 January 2007 – 21 December 2015
- Preceded by: Lennart Johansson
- Succeeded by: Ángel María Villar (acting); Aleksander Čeferin

Personal details
- Born: Michel François Platini; 21 June 1955 (age 71) Jœuf, Meurthe-et-Moselle, France
- Height: 1.79 m (5 ft 10 in)
- Occupation: Footballer; Manager; Football administrator
Association football career
- Position: Attacking midfielder
Youth career
- 1966–1972: AS Jœuf
- 1972: Nancy
Senior career*
Years	Team	Apps	(Gls)
1972–1979	Nancy	181	(98)
1979–1982	Saint-Étienne	104	(58)
1982–1987	Juventus	147	(68)
Total		432	(224)
International career
1975–1976	France Olympic	7	(4)
1976–1987	France	72	(41)
1988	Kuwait	1	(0)
Managerial career
- 1988–1992: France
Medal record
Men's football
Representing France
FIFA World Cup
Third place	1986
UEFA European Championship
Winner	1984
Finalissima
Winner	1985
- * Club domestic league appearances and goals

Michel François Platini (French: [miʃɛl fʁɑ̃swa platini]; born 21 June 1955) is a French football administrator and former player and manager. Regarded as one of the greatest footballers of all time, Platini won the Ballon d'Or three times in a row, in 1983, 1984 and 1985, and came seventh in the FIFA Player of the Century vote. In recognition of his achievements, he was named a Knight of the Legion of Honour in 1985 and became an Officer in 1998. As the president of UEFA in 2015, he was banned from involvement in football under FIFA's organisation, over ethics violations. The ban lasted until 2023.

During his career, Platini played for the clubs Nancy, Saint-Étienne, and Juventus. Nicknamed Le Roi ("The King") for his ability and leadership, he was a prolific goalscorer; he won the Serie A capocannoniere award three consecutive times between 1983 and 1985, and was the top scorer of Juventus's victorious 1984–85 European Cup campaign. Platini was a key player of the France national team that won the 1984 European Championship, a tournament in which he was the top scorer and best player, and reached the semi-finals of the 1982 and 1986 World Cups. Together with midfielders Alain Giresse, Luis Fernandez and Jean Tigana, he formed the carré magique (magic square) of the French team in the 1980s. Platini was his country's record goalscorer until 2007, and held the record for most goals scored (9) in the European Championship until being surpassed by Cristiano Ronaldo in 2021, despite only appearing in the 1984 tournament.

Following his retirement as a player, Platini was the France national team coach from 1988 to 1992, and was the co-organizer of the 1998 World Cup in France. In 2007, he became the first former player to be elected as the president of the Union of European Football Associations (UEFA). He also held the positions of chairman of FIFA's Technical and Development Committee and vice-president of the French Football Federation.

== Early life and career ==
Michel François Platini was born on 21 June 1955 in Jœuf, Meurthe-et-Moselle, the son of Aldo and Anna (née Piccinelli), both of Italian ancestry. Anna's family has its roots in the province of Belluno, while Aldo's father, Francesco Platini, was an immigrant from Agrate Conturbia, in the province of Novara, and settled in France shortly after the end of the First World War. Aldo was a professional footballer and a long-time director for AS Nancy, the club where Michel started his professional career.

After performing poorly in the final of a 1969 young footballers' competition, Michel Platini attracted attention at 16 years of age in a Coupe Gambardella tournament match with an impressive display for Jœuf juniors against a Metz junior side. Platini was called up for a trial with Metz, but missed out on the opportunity due to injury, and was not immediately invited back after the Metz coach moved to another club. He returned to regional league football with Jœuf. Another trial at Metz went horribly wrong when a breathing test on a spirometer caused Platini to faint. The doctor's verdict on Platini's breathing difficulties and weak heart ended any hopes Platini had of playing for his boyhood favorites. He then joined the reserve side of his father's club Nancy in September 1972, and became friends with team goalkeeper Jean-Michel Moutier.

== Club career ==
=== Nancy (1972–1979) ===
Platini was quick to make a big impression at his new club, scoring a hat-trick in a reserve team match against Wittelsheim. Further outstanding displays put him in contention for a place in the Nancy first team. His introduction to the first-team squad was inauspicious. On the substitutes' bench for a match against Valenciennes, Platini was spat on and hit by various objects thrown from the crowd when a fight broke out in the stands. Playing for the reserves a few days later, a hefty challenge from an opponent left Platini with a bad ankle injury. His season would finish on a more positive note, and he would go on to make his league debut against Nîmes on 3 May 1973.

In March 1974, he suffered a setback when he sustained a double fracture of his left arm in a match at OGC Nice. Platini missed the remainder of the season as a result, unable to assist Nancy in an unsuccessful bid to avoid relegation from Ligue 1. The following season saw Nancy win promotion back to the French first division with ease. Platini became the team's most important player, scoring 17 goals, a number of which were scored from free-kicks, as was becoming Platini's specialty. Saint-Étienne, the then reigning French league champions, were knocked out of the French Cup with two goals from Platini's free-kicks. Platini practised his free-kicks with the help of his friend, goalkeeper Moutier, and using a row of dummies to form a defensive wall of sorts.

With Nancy back in Ligue 1, Platini's military service reduced his availability for matches, but he continued to make himself available to play when possible. In a match away to Laval, Platini, angered by the taunts of the home supporters, scored a hat-trick, but sustained another injury. Press reports claimed that Platini's season was over and that he would require a knee operation, but neither claim proved to be correct. Instead, Platini returned to first-team football two weeks later for Nancy's French Cup semi-final against Marseille at the Parc des Princes. Platini headed the only Nancy goal in their 4–1 loss and was forced to leave the field injured. Following his participation in the 1976 Montreal Olympics, Platini signed a two-year contract with Nancy, his first professional contract.

Before travelling to Argentina for the World Cup, Platini won the first major trophy of his playing career, captaining Nancy to victory in the 1978 French Cup final against Nice and scoring the only goal of the game. President Valéry Giscard d'Estaing presented him with the trophy. However, with the World Cup scheduled to start two weeks after the cup final, there was little time left for preparation.

Although Platini was not disgraced by his performances at his first World Cup, fans held him responsible for the French team's failure to progress in the tournament, and in the season that followed he was a target of jeering crowds. The situation came to a head in a match away to Saint-Étienne. Spurred on by booing fans, Platini competed for every ball, and he picked up a bad ankle injury in a tackle. As a result, he was ruled out of Nancy's Cup Winners' Cup campaign. His contract with the club expired in June 1979, and Internazionale, Paris Saint-Germain, and Saint-Étienne emerged as the clubs most likely to sign him, although the Nancy club president had been unwilling to let Platini leave the club. Having set his mind on a transfer to Saint-Étienne, he signed a three-year contract with les Verts.

In spite of his injuries and the boos that would greet him, Platini maintained his pranksterish sense of humour. On away trips, he would set off firecrackers in public places and then pretend to be dead, inevitably drawing a crowd. While in Argentina for the World Cup, he would squeeze tubes of toothpaste into his teammates' beds.

=== Saint-Étienne (1979–1982) ===
Platini's three years at Saint-Étienne were a mixed success. The club had signed him with a view to success in the European Cup, but despite some excellent results (including a 6–0 win over PSV in the 1979–80 UEFA Cup and a 5–0 win at Hamburger SV in the UEFA Cup the following season), the club were unable to surpass the feats of the Saint-Étienne side that had reached the final of the 1976 European Cup.

Platini won the French league title in 1981 with Les Verts, but was on a losing Saint-Étienne side in two French Cup finals, against Bastia in 1981 and against Paris Saint-Germain in 1982, in what was his last match for the club before joining Juventus. He left for a nominal transfer fee (under UEFA regulations) despite being out of contract and no fee being necessary under French regulations at the time.

=== Juventus (1982–1987) ===
At Juventus, Platini inherited the number 10 shirt from the recently departed Liam Brady. In a team featuring numerous members of Italy's victorious World Cup squad, Platini had a difficult introduction to Italian football. He was a target in the demanding Italian sports media, and even came close to leaving Italy in the winter of his first season. Platini and teammate Zbigniew Boniek successfully called for a change in tactics, and in the second half of the season Juventus saw an upturn in their fortunes. They reached the European Cup final, losing to Hamburger SV, but won the Italian Cup, the first of many club honours to follow for Platini in the coming seasons.

"We bought him for a morsel of bread and he put foie gras on top of it!"

— Gianni Agnelli, Juventus president.

He won the Serie A title with Juventus in 1984 and 1986, the European Cup Winners' Cup in 1984 (setting up Vignola's opening goal in the Turin club's 2–1 victory over Porto in the final of the competition), the 1984 European Super Cup, the European Cup in 1985 and the 1985 Intercontinental Cup. He finished top scorer in Serie A for three consecutive seasons (1982–83, 1983–84, and 1984–85), and won a hat-trick of European Footballer of the Year awards (1983 through 1985). He was also voted Player of the Year by World Soccer magazine in 1984 and 1985.

"I played for Nancy because it was my hometown club and the best in Lorraine, for Saint-Étienne because it was the best team in France, and for Juventus because it is the best team in the world!"

— Platini after his final match in Serie A against Brescia, in 1987.

The 1985 European Cup final against Liverpool at the Heysel Stadium in Brussels should have been the crowning moment of Platini's Juventus career, but was instead overshadowed by the Heysel Stadium disaster in which 39 people died, and 600 more were injured. It was decided to proceed with the match in order to avoid inciting any further trouble, and after both captains had appealed for calm, the match began just under an hour and a half beyond schedule, with riot police still engaged in a pitched battle with Juventus fans. Platini scored the only goal of the match from a penalty kick, which had been controversially awarded by referee André Daina for a foul just outside the area on Zbigniew Boniek by Gary Gillespie, after the Frenchman had met his run behind the defence towards goal with a long ball. In the days following the final, Platini was criticised in some quarters for his lack of restraint in celebrating Juventus' win. In his own defence, Platini maintained that he had not been made fully aware of the scale of the disaster. In the 1985 Intercontinental Cup final against Argentinos Juniors, Platini scored from a penalty during regulation time, also having another goal disallowed, and later assisted Michael Laudrup's equaliser; he subsequently netted the match-winning penalty in the resulting shoot-out, and was named Man of the Match. Following the 1986 World Cup in Mexico, Platini spent another season at Juventus before retiring from football in June 1987.

== International career ==
Having first attracted the attention of national team selectors in the Coupe Gambardella tournament, Platini was selected for the French junior team, but injuries prevented him from playing. He made his first appearance for a French national selection playing for the French amateur side on 26 September 1973.

Platini began his military service in summer 1975. He was assigned to the Joinville battalion, as were all talented French sportspeople fulfilling their military obligations. His colleagues in the battalion included his Nancy teammates Olivier Rouyer and Jean-Michel Moutier, as well as Maxime Bossis, soon to become a regular in the French national team along with Platini. Platini would turn out for the French military team, in addition to representing the French under-23s and the French Olympic team. He impressed in the Olympic team's 4–0 win over Romania in Brest, a result made even more impressive by the fact that Romania had fielded a full international side for the Olympic qualifier. Platini's performance made him a star in France. The away leg of the qualifying tie was a mere formality, France coming away with a 1–1 draw. Three days after the draw in Bucharest, Platini received his first call-up to the national team for what was coach Michel Hidalgo's first game in charge, a friendly against Czechoslovakia in Paris (27 March 1976, 2–2), and scored his first goal with a trademark free kick.

=== 1976 Olympics ===
Platini was a member of the French football team at the 1976 Summer Olympics in Montreal. Their tournament began on 19 July with a 4–1 win over Mexico. They registered another 4–1 win in their next match against Guatemala, with two goals from Platini. The French team completed the group stage with a draw against Israel, Platini scoring from a penalty. France progressed to the quarter-final stage, where they would face a full-strength East German team. France lost 4–0 and finished the match with nine men.

=== Prior to 1978 World Cup ===
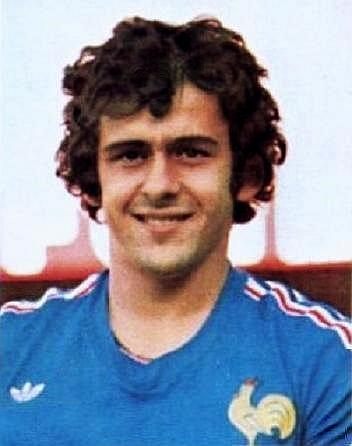
Platini with France at the 1978 World Cup

With a 3–1 win over Bulgaria at the Parc des Princes on 16 November 1977, a match in which Platini excelled in the role of playmaker and scored with a strike from 30 yards, France secured qualification for the 1978 World Cup in Argentina for their first appearance in the World Cup finals since 1966. In the month following the decisive qualifying match, Platini finished third in the voting for the 1977 European Footballer of the Year.

Among the international friendlies France played in preparation for the World Cup, their match against Italy in Naples on 8 February 1978 (2–2) was particularly significant for Platini. With a number of scouts from Italian clubs in attendance, he was in excellent form. He beat Italian goalkeeper Dino Zoff from two direct free-kicks, the first being ruled out because the referee had not blown his whistle. The re-taken free-kick was blocked by the defensive wall, but minutes later Platini had the ball in the Italian net from another free-kick. Zoff attempted to anticipate the flight of the ball by positioning himself on the left side of the goal, only for Platini to find the unguarded area of the net with his free-kick, leaving Zoff rooted to the spot. Platini's duels with Zoff and his performance in a match that was broadcast on Italian television made him well known in Italy. A number of clubs both in France (Paris Saint-Germain and Saint-Étienne) and across Europe (including Juventus, Internazionale, Napoli, Barcelona, Valencia, and Arsenal) began the clamour for Platini's services.

=== 1978 World Cup ===
In retrospect, this match may have been a Pyrrhic victory because Platini's brilliance drew the attention of Italy coach Enzo Bearzot, who devised a successful plan to contain him in a match-up that really mattered—the first round of the 1978 World Cup four months later. Platini was kept in check by Marco Tardelli's implacable marking and Italy won 2–1. Drawn in a difficult group with Italy as well as hosts (and eventual winners) Argentina, France's loss to the hosts in Buenos Aires effectively ensured their elimination; France did not survive the first round.

=== Road to Spain '82 and the World Cup ===
Platini was nonetheless made captain of the French national side after the World Cup and made the number 10 jersey his own. One of his trademark free-kicks helped France defeat the Netherlands 2–0 in Paris (18 November 1981) in a crucial qualifying match for the 1982 World Cup in Spain.

France unexpectedly reached the semifinals of the 1982 World Cup where they met West Germany in Seville for what proved to be one of the greatest matches in World Cup history. German goalkeeper Harald Schumacher had collided with Patrick Battiston, leaving the Frenchman knocked-out cold, and the referee did not call a penalty, much to the anger of the French. With both sides level at 3–3 after extra time had been played (Platini having scored France's first goal of the game from a penalty) the match went to a penalty shoot-out which West Germany won 5–4.

=== Euro '84 ===
"He didn't run a lot like Cruyff and didn't depend on his physique, but I liked how he was the brain organising things on the pitch. He was a player who used his head in the broader sense. The way he shone with France and Juventus, and his capacity for taking free-kicks, made him the European footballer of the 1980s."

— Pelé.

In 1984, Platini captained France to success in the European Championship on home soil. His individual impact on the team was enormous, scoring nine of France's 14 goals in just five games, making him by far the top goal scorer of the tournament.

He scored the winner in France's opening match against Denmark, and scored two "perfect" hat-tricks against Belgium and Yugoslavia as France topped their first-round group with three wins out of three. In the dramatic semi-final in Marseille against Portugal, Platini scored the final goal of the match for a memorable 3–2 win in the last minute of extra time.

In the final against Spain at the Parc des Princes in Paris, he opened the scoring with a free kick-goal, helped by a monumental blunder from Spain goalkeeper Luis Arconada. A second goal from Bruno Bellone in injury time at the end of the match secured France's first major title in international football.

=== Mexico '86 ===
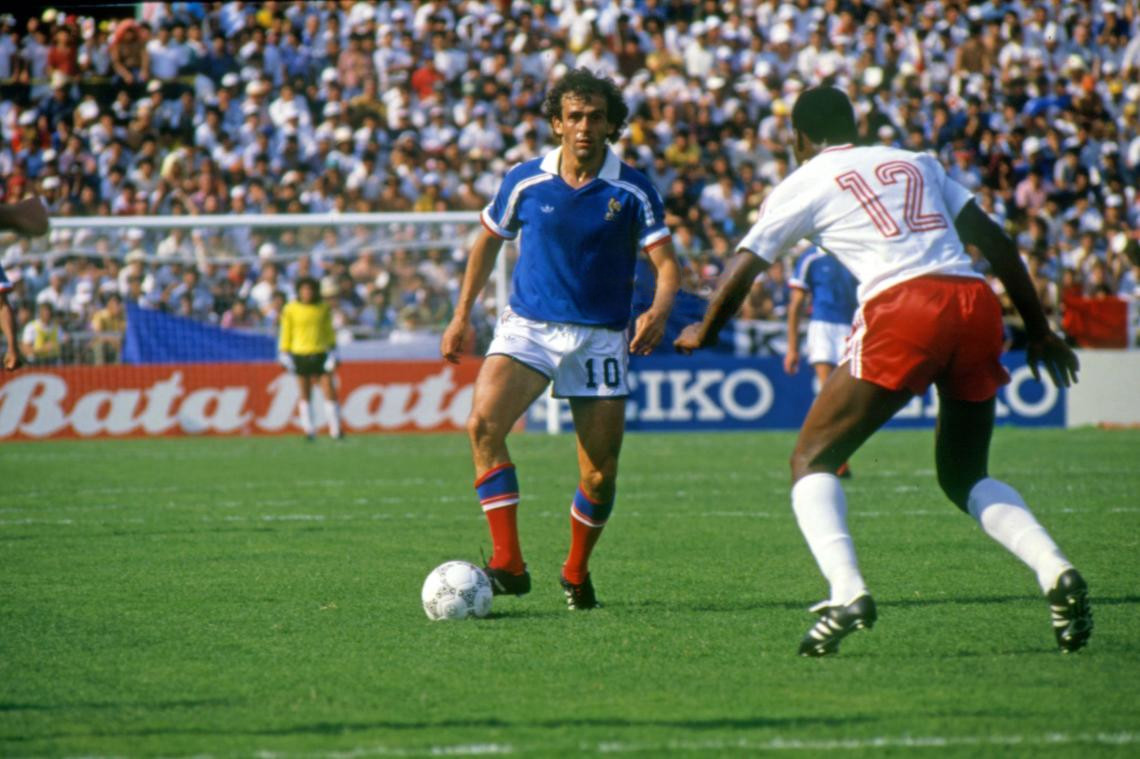
Platini in the match v Canada at the 1986 World Cup

Suffering from groin pain and playing under injection, Platini was not in peak physical condition for the 1986 World Cup in Mexico. Nonetheless, he contributed two important goals. The first contributed to their 2–0 defeat of defending champions Italy at the Olimpico Stadium in Mexico City. The second came during the quarter-final match against Brazil in Guadalajara. After Careca scored for Brazil, Platini scored the equalizer, his 41st on his 31st birthday, which sent the game into a penalty shoot-out. France won 4–3, with Platini infamously sending his shot over the bar. This goal was to be the last of his international career. After losing a second World Cup semi-final in a row to West Germany in Guadalajara, France had to settle for third place. Platini did not take part in the 1982 or 1986 World Cup third-place matches.

=== Retirement ===
"When I was a kid and played with my friends, I always chose to be Platini. I let my friends share the names of my other idols between themselves."

— Zinedine Zidane

Platini made his last appearance for France on 29 April 1987, in a European Championship qualifier at home to Iceland, a few weeks before announcing his retirement from all football. In 72 appearances for France from 1976 to 1987, including 49 appearances as captain, Platini scored 41 times, a record for the French national team, which has since only been surpassed by two men: Thierry Henry, after scoring his 42nd and 43rd national team goals against Lithuania in a Euro 2008 qualifying match on 17 October 2007, and Olivier Giroud, who scored his 41st and 42nd goals for France in a 7–1 friendly victory over Ukraine on 7 October 2020.

=== Kuwait ===
Platini's last match came on 27 November 1988, when he came out of retirement for one day to play in an international friendly match representing Kuwait against the Soviet Union, at the request of the Kuwaiti Emir. Platini played a total of 21 minutes in the 2–0 loss to the Soviets. In doing so, Platini completed the rare feat of appearing for more than one country at full international level.

== Style of play ==
"Michel was one of those great players who saw fitness work as being a bit superficial. He used to say, 'We're not going to compete in the 5,000 metres at the Olympics, we have to play with our feet."

— Giovanni Trapattoni, former Juventus coach on Platini.

Platini is considered to be one of the greatest players of all time, and is regarded as one of the finest passers in football history, as well as one of the best ever penalty kick and free kick specialists to have played the game. A quick, versatile, elegant, and intelligent offensive midfield playmaker, with a unique ability to read the game and bend the ball from set pieces, he was renowned in particular for his ball control, technical ability, dribbling skills, creativity, range of passing, and vision, despite his lack of notable physical or athletic attributes.

Although he primarily served as a creative midfielder, who operated in a more withdrawn playing role behind the strikers, and who mainly orchestrated attacking plays, provided assists, or created chances for teammates, Platini was also a prolific goalscorer. Due to his footballing intelligence, movement, and composure in front of goal, as well as his accurate finishing ability with either foot, as well as his head, despite being naturally right-footed, he was known for his ability to create attacking opportunities for himself by playing exchanges with his teammates until he was in a position from which he could receive the ball and score; indeed, he won several top-scoring awards throughout his career, both at club and international level, and is considered by pundits to be one of the best finishers of all time.

When taking free kicks, Platini usually preferred to strike the ball from a distance of around 20 metres from the goal, with a direct kick which had not been touched by a teammate first; his unique free kick technique, which often involved him hitting the ball over the wall, influenced many other specialists, such as Alessandro Del Piero, and Andrea Pirlo. Despite his talent, skill, and outstanding playing ability, Platini also drew criticism from his managers at times, due to his lack of stamina and poor defensive work-rate. Due to his leadership, dominance, and his technical, offensive, and creative attributes, as well as his ability to be a decisive player for his teams, he was given the nickname "Le Roi" ("The King", in French). Moreover, Platini was known for his discipline on the pitch; indeed, in his extensive career, he was never sent off.

Michel Platini's life and work are presented through an impressively extensive collection of sporting exhibits, honoured with two Guinness World Records, at the Michel Platini Museum located in the village of Mosfiloti, Cyprus.

== Coaching career ==
Platini was named coach of the French national side on 1 November 1988, replacing Henri Michel, who had been forced out after France infamously drew with Cyprus (1–1) in a 1990 World Cup qualifier. France's qualifying campaign was ultimately unsuccessful.

The focus of the team shifted to qualifying for the 1992 European Championship in Sweden. France excelled in the qualifying stages, winning all eight of their group matches, including notable victories away to Spain and Czechoslovakia. After a record 19-match unbeaten run, they were among the favourites to win the competition and Platini was named Manager of the Year by the World Soccer Awards. But a string of uninspiring performances in warm-up matches, followed by France's first-round elimination from the tournament, led Platini to step down as coach.

== Administrative roles ==
"He [Platini] was a great player who left a mark on his era, and it's always good when players take up positions in the higher echelons of the game. He knows everything there is to know about football."

— Lilian Thuram, France '98 World Cup winning defender.

Platini was, along with Fernand Sastre, head of the organizing committee for the 1998 FIFA World Cup, held in France. He served on the UEFA Technical Development Committee from 1988 to 1990. He has been a member of the UEFA Executive Committee and European member of the FIFA Executive Committee since 2002. He continued to climb the ranks of UEFA and FIFA football administration and in 2006, became a chairman of the FIFA Technical and Development Committee, while also being vice-president of the French Football Federation.

=== UEFA presidency ===
Platini confirmed that he would run for the UEFA presidency in July 2006. In the election in Düsseldorf on 26 January 2007, he defeated Lennart Johansson, who held the post for the previous 16 years, by 27 votes to 23. Platini based his speech on virtues of solidarity and universality.

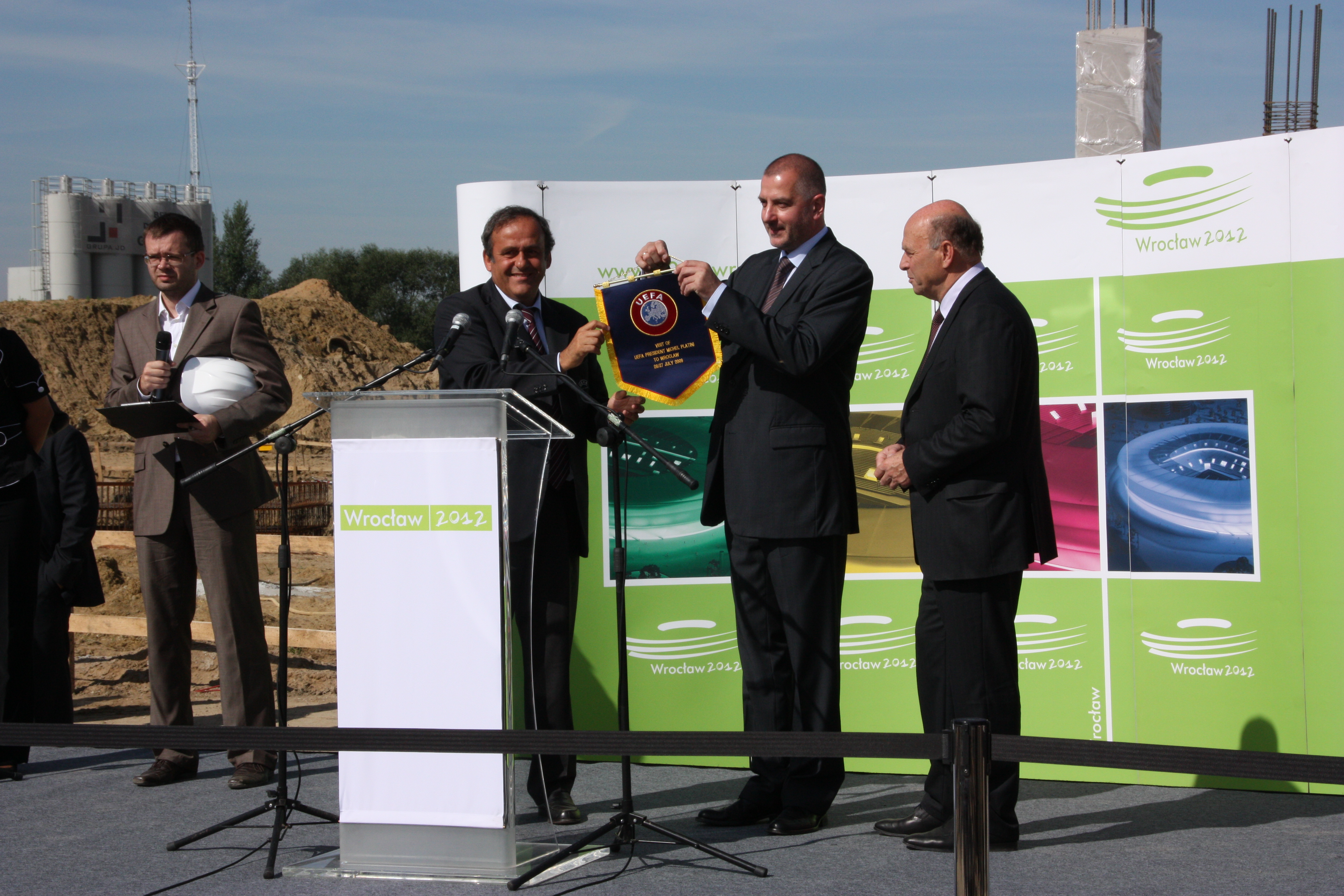
Michel Platini visiting the construction site of the Stadion Miejski, 2009

In 2008, Platini backed the 6+5 idea, six home-grown players and five foreign players to be introduced in top-flight teams in Europe. Platini has also backed caps on wages, transfer spending – both absolute and as a fraction of club turnover – and foreign ownership of clubs. He has stated that he wants to reduce the number of Italian, Spanish, and English teams that participate in the UEFA Champions League to a maximum of three instead of four. This has not happened yet, but instead for the 2009–10 season, different routes were created for champions of smaller countries and non-champions of bigger countries. He has also talked about banning clubs from the competition based on the debts of the clubs. Among his more contentious claims is that international transfer of players under 18 is in fact a form of illegal "child trafficking" and should be prohibited by the EU. "Paying a child to kick a ball is not that different from paying a child to work [...] in a factory," said Platini to members of the European Parliament on 18 February 2009.

=== FIFA presidential campaign ===
Following Sepp Blatter's announcement in June 2015 that he would resign from the post of FIFA president amid the ongoing corruption scandal, Platini announced in July that he would run for FIFA president in the 2016 special election. However, on 7 January 2016, Platini announced that he would not be standing in the Fifa presidential election, saying: "The timing is not good for me. I don't have the means to fight on equal terms with the other candidates. […] Bye bye Fifa, bye bye Fifa presidency."

=== Corruption ===
Following the 2015 FIFA corruption case, and after his announcement that in July he would run for FIFA president, Platini was also involved himself in the case. Swiss prosecutors accused FIFA president Sepp Blatter of making a "disloyal payment" of $2m (£1.6m) to Platini. Swiss attorney general, Michael Lauber, stated: "We didn't interview Mr Platini as a witness, that's not true. We investigated against him in between as a witness and an accused person." Both Platini and Blatter were placed under formal investigation by FIFA's independent ethics committee in late September 2015.

On 8 October 2015, Platini was provisionally suspended until 6 January 2016 from any football-related activity. On 21 December, Platini and Blatter were both found guilty of ethics violations and barred from the sport until 2023. The committee said Platini "did not show commitment to an ethical attitude" and lacked respect for laws and regulations of the organization. Platini boycotted the hearing, and said he planned to appeal the decision, declaring himself "at peace with my conscience." He appealed to Swiss courts, and to the European Court of Human Rights, but the courts rejected his appeals.

Platini was also involved in the Greek public polemic regarding the 2015 Greek football scandal. In April 2016, Platini was named in the Panama Papers. On 18 May 2018, Platini said that the 1998 FIFA World Cup draw was fixed to ensure France and Brazil could not face each other until the final if both teams won their groups. In June 2019, Platini was questioned over the awarding of the 2022 World Cup to Qatar. In July 2022, Platini was acquitted of the charges of fraud, forgery, mismanagement and misappropriation of more than $2 million of FIFA money, an outcome that was confirmed on appeal in March 2025. In June 2026, Platini filed a criminal complaint against FIFA President Gianni Infantino.

== Personal life and health ==
On 21 December 1977, Michel Platini married Christèle Bigoni with whom he had two children: Laurent (born 2 March 1979, lawyer specializing in sports) and Marine (born in 1980, actress)

On 9 July 2010, the day before the third place play-off of the 2010 World Cup in South Africa, Platini collapsed at a restaurant in the Michaelangelo Hotel in Sandton, Johannesburg. He was rushed to the Morningside Medi-Clinic with a suspected heart attack after having received first aid care by a Brazilian radio director who was sitting at a table next to him. He was attended to and discharged by cardiologist and former President of the South African Heart Association – Dr Leonard Steingo. The official statement released by FIFA confirmed that Platini was discharged, stating that the UEFA President was "fine, and merely suffering from a bout of flu." Platini was confirmed in attendance two days later at the final between Spain and Netherlands on the evening of 11 July.

== Career statistics ==
=== Club ===
Appearances and goals by club, season and competition
Club	Season	League			National cup (Note: Includes Coupe de France, Coppa Italia)		Europe		Other		Total	
Club	Season	Division	Apps	Goals	Apps	Goals	Apps	Goals	Apps	Goals	Apps	Goals
Nancy	1972–73	Division 1	4	2	–		–		–		4	2
Nancy	1973–74	Division 1	21	2	3	0	–		–		24	2
Nancy	1974–75	Division 2	32	17	6	13	–		–		38	30
Nancy	1975–76	Division 1	31	22	7	6	–		–		38	28
Nancy	1976–77	Division 1	38	25	1	0	–		–		39	25
Nancy	1977–78	Division 1	36	18	10	7	–		–		46	25
Nancy	1978–79	Division 1	19	12	5	3	–		–		24	15
Nancy	Total		181	98	32	29	–		–		213	127
Saint-Étienne	1979–80	Division 1	33	16	7	5	7 (Note: Appearances in UEFA Cup)	5	–		47	26
Saint-Étienne	1980–81	Division 1	35	20	10	5	7	4	–		52	29
Saint-Étienne	1981–82	Division 1	36	22	8	5	2 (Note: Appearances in European Cup)	0	–		46	27
Saint-Étienne	Total		104	58	25	15	16	9	–		145	82
Juventus	1982–83	Serie A	30	16	9	7	9	5	–		48	28
Juventus	1983–84	Serie A	28	20	7	3	8 (Note: Appearances in European Cup Winners' Cup)	2	–		43	25
Juventus	1984–85	Serie A	30	18	9	4	9	7	1 (Note: Appearance in European Super Cup)	0	49	29
Juventus	1985–86	Serie A	30	12	6	1	6	3	1 (Note: Appearance in Intercontinental Cup)	1	43	17
Juventus	1986–87	Serie A	29	2	8	1	4	2	–		41	5
Juventus	Total		147	68	39	16	36	19	2	1	224	104
Career total			432	224	96	60	52	28	2	1	582	313

=== International ===
Appearances and goals by national team and year
National team	Year	Apps	Goals
France	1976	5	4
France	1977	7	2
France	1978	6	4
France	1979	4	2
France	1980	6	5
France	1981	4	2
France	1982	10	4
France	1983	4	1
France	1984	10	13
France	1985	6	2
France	1986	9	2
France	1987	1	0
France	Total	72	41
Kuwait	1988	1	0
Kuwait	Total	1	0
Career total		73	41

Scores and results list France's goal tally first, score column indicates score after each Platini goal.

List of international goals scored by Michel Platini
No.	Date	Venue	Opponent	Score	Result	Competition
1	27 March 1976	Parc des Princes, Paris, France	Czechoslovakia	2–0	2–2	Friendly
2	1 September 1976	Idrætspark, Copenhagen, Denmark	Denmark	1–1	1–1	Friendly
3	9 October 1976	Vasil Levski National Stadium, Sofia, Bulgaria	Bulgaria	1–0	2–2	1978 FIFA World Cup qualification
4	17 November 1976	Parc des Princes, Paris, France	Republic of Ireland	1–0	2–0	1978 FIFA World Cup qualification
5	23 April 1977	Charmilles Stadium, Geneva, Switzerland	Switzerland	1–0	4–0	Friendly
6	16 November 1977	Parc des Princes, Paris, France	Bulgaria	2–0	3–1	1978 FIFA World Cup qualification
7	8 February 1978	Stadio San Paolo, Naples, Italy	Italy	2–2	2–2	Friendly
8	1 April 1978	Parc des Princes, Paris, France	Brazil	1–0	1–0	Friendly
9	19 May 1978	Stadium Nord, Villeneuve-d'Ascq, France	Tunisia	1–0	2–0	Friendly
10	6 June 1978	Estadio Monumental, Buenos Aires, Argentina	Argentina	1–1	1–2	1978 FIFA World Cup
11	5 September 1979	Råsunda Stadium, Solna, Sweden	Sweden	2–1	3–1	UEFA Euro 1980 qualifying
12	10 October 1979	Parc des Princes, Paris, France	United States	1–0	3–0	Friendly
13	27 February 1980	Parc des Princes, Paris, France	Greece	2–1	5–1	Friendly
14	27 February 1980	Parc des Princes, Paris, France	Greece	3–1	5–1	Friendly
15	11 October 1980	Tsirio Stadium, Limassol, Cyprus	Cyprus	2–0	7–0	1982 FIFA World Cup qualification
16	11 October 1980	Tsirio Stadium, Limassol, Cyprus	Cyprus	3–0	7–0	1982 FIFA World Cup qualification
17	28 October 1980	Parc des Princes, Paris, France	Republic of Ireland	1–0	2–0	1982 FIFA World Cup qualification
18	14 October 1981	Lansdowne Road, Dublin, Republic of Ireland	Republic of Ireland	2–3	2–3	1982 FIFA World Cup qualification
19	18 November 1981	Parc des Princes, Paris, France	Netherlands	1–0	2–0	1982 FIFA World Cup qualification
20	23 February 1982	Parc des Princes, Paris, France	Italy	1–0	2–0	Friendly
21	21 June 1982	Estadio José Zorrilla, Valladolid, Spain	Kuwait	2–0	4–1	1982 FIFA World Cup
22	8 July 1982	Estadio Ramón Sánchez Pizjuán, Seville, Spain	West Germany	1–1	3–3 (4–5 p)	1982 FIFA World Cup
23	10 November 1982	De Kuip, Rotterdam, Netherlands	Netherlands	2–1	2–1	Friendly
24	7 September 1983	Idrætspark, Copenhagen, Denmark	Denmark	1–1	1–3	Friendly
25	29 February 1984	Parc des Princes, Paris, France	England	1–0	2–0	Friendly
26	29 February 1984	Parc des Princes, Paris, France	England	2–0	2–0	Friendly
27	12 June 1984	Parc des Princes, Paris, France	Denmark	1–0	1–0	UEFA Euro 1984
28	16 June 1984	Stade de la Beaujoire, Nantes, France	Belgium	1–0	5–0	UEFA Euro 1984
29	16 June 1984	Stade de la Beaujoire, Nantes, France	Belgium	4–0	5–0	UEFA Euro 1984
30	16 June 1984	Stade de la Beaujoire, Nantes, France	Belgium	5–0	5–0	UEFA Euro 1984
31	19 June 1984	Stade Geoffroy-Guichard, Saint-Étienne, France	Yugoslavia	1–1	3–2	UEFA Euro 1984
32	19 June 1984	Stade Geoffroy-Guichard, Saint-Étienne, France	Yugoslavia	2–1	3–2	UEFA Euro 1984
33	19 June 1984	Stade Geoffroy-Guichard, Saint-Étienne, France	Yugoslavia	3–1	3–2	UEFA Euro 1984
34	23 June 1984	Stade Vélodrome, Marseille, France	Portugal	3–2	3–2	UEFA Euro 1984
35	27 June 1984	Parc des Princes, Paris, France	Spain	1–0	2–0	UEFA Euro 1984
36	13 October 1984	Stade Municipal, Luxembourg City, Luxembourg	Luxembourg	2–0	4–0	1986 FIFA World Cup qualification
37	21 November 1984	Parc des Princes, Paris, France	Bulgaria	1–0	1–0	1986 FIFA World Cup qualification
38	16 November 1985	Parc des Princes, Paris, France	Yugoslavia	1–0	2–0	1986 FIFA World Cup qualification
39	16 November 1985	Parc des Princes, Paris, France	Yugoslavia	2–0	2–0	1986 FIFA World Cup qualification
40	17 June 1986	Estadio Olímpico Universitario, Mexico City, Mexico	Italy	1–0	2–0	1986 FIFA World Cup
41	21 June 1986	Estadio Jalisco, Guadalajara, Mexico	Brazil	1–1	1–1 (4–3 p)	1986 FIFA World Cup

== Managerial statistics ==
Managerial record by team and tenure
Team	From	To	Record				
Team	From	To	G	W	D	L	Win %
France	1 November 1988	17 June 1992	29	16	8	5	55.17
Total			29	16	8	5	55.17

== Honours ==
=== Player ===
Nancy

- Coupe de France: 1977–78
- Division 2: 1974–75

Saint-Étienne

- Division 1: 1980–81
- Coupe de France runner-up: 1980–81, 1981–82

Juventus

- Serie A: 1983–84, 1985–86
- Coppa Italia: 1982–83
- European Cup: 1984–85; runner-up: 1982–83
- European Cup Winners' Cup: 1983–84
- European Super Cup: 1984
- Intercontinental Cup: 1985

France

- UEFA European Championship: 1984
- Finalissima: 1985
- FIFA World Cup third place: 1986

Individual

- French Player of the Year: 1976, 1977
- Onze d'Argent: 1977
- L'Équipe French Champion of Champions: 1977, 1984
- Onze de Onze: 1977, 1982, 1983, 1984, 1985, 1986
- World XI: 1979
- Sport Ideal European XI: 1977, 1978, 1979, 1980
- FIFA World Cup All-Star Team: 1982, 1986
- Capocannoniere (Serie A top scorer): 1982–83, 1983–84, 1984–85
- El Gráfico Player of the Year: 1983
- Ballon d'Or: 1983, 1984, 1985
- Onze d'Or: 1983, 1984, 1985
- Guerin Sportivo All-Star Team: 1983, 1984
- Guerin Sportivo's Serie A Team of The Year: 1984
- Guerin d'Oro: 1983–84
- UEFA European Championship Player of the Tournament: 1984
- UEFA European Championship Top Scorer: 1984
- UEFA European Championship Team of the Tournament: 1984
- European Cup Top Scorer: 1984–85
- World Soccer Player of the Year: 1984, 1985
- Guerin Sportivo Player of the Year: 1984, 1985
- World Soccer World XI: 1982, 1983, 1984, 1985
- Intercontinental Cup Most Valuable Player of the Match Award: 1985
- FIFA World Cup All-Time Team: 1994
- Super Onze d'Or: 1995
- Planète Foot Magazine Team of All Time: 1996
- Planète Foot's 50 Best Player of All Time: 1996
- Venerdì's 100 Magnificent: 1997
- World Team of the 20th Century: 1998
- French Player of the Century: 1999
- RSSSF French National Team of All Time: 1999
- Placar's 100 Players of the Century: 1999 (#8)
- Guerin Sportivo's 50 Greatest Players of the Century by Adalberto Bortolotti: 1999 (#9)
- France Football Player of the Century: 1999 (#5)
- World Soccer's 100 Greatest Footballers of All Time: 1999 (#5)
- IFFHS World Player of the Century: 1999 (#7)
- FIFA World Cup Dream Team: 2002
- Golden Foot: 2004, as football legend
- FIFA 100: 2004
- UEFA Golden Jubilee Poll: 2004 (#9)
- Placar's 100 World Cup Stars: 2005 (#19)
- AFS Top-100 Players of All-Time: 2007 (#13)
- English Football Hall of Fame: 2008 (voted All-Time Greatest European Footballer. He is only the second person outside the English game to be honoured by the Museum.)
- Premio internazionale Giacinto Facchetti: 2011
- Italian Football Hall of Fame: 2011
- World Hall of Fame of Soccer: 2011
- Globe Soccer Awards Player Career Award: 2012
- Juventus Greatest XI of All Time: 2017
- Ballon d'Or Dream Team (Bronze): 2020
- IFFHS All-time Men's B Dream Team: 2021
- IFFHS All-time Europe Men's Dream Team: 2021
- Artemio Franchi Prize
- IFFHS Legends
- Voetbal International's World Stars by Raf Willems
- Juventus FC Hall of Fame: 2025

=== Manager ===
Individual

- El País European Coach of the Year: 1991
- World Soccer Manager of the Year: 1991

=== Orders ===
- Knight of the Legion of Honour: 1985
- Officer of the National Order of Merit: 1994
- Officer of the Legion of Honour: 1998

== See also ==
- List of FIFA World Cup top goalscorers

== Bibliography ==
- Michel Platini, "Ma vie comme un match", 1987
