= 1985–86 Serie A =

84th season of top-tier Italian football

Serie A
- Season: 1985–86
- Dates: 8 September 1985 – 27 April 1986
- Champions: Juventus; 22nd title
- Relegated: Pisa; Bari; Lecce
- European Cup: Juventus
- Cup Winners' Cup: Roma
- UEFA Cup: Napoli; Fiorentina; Internazionale; Torino
- Matches: 240
- Goals: 495 (2.06 per match)
- Top goalscorer: Roberto Pruzzo (19 goals)
- Longest winning run: 19 matches Roma
- Longest unbeaten run: 19 matches Roma
- Longest winless run: 19 matches Lecce
- Longest losing run: 19 matches Lecce
- All statistics correct as of 27 April 1986.

Serie A 1985-86 team distribution

The 1985–86 Serie A season was won by Juventus.

== Teams ==
Pisa, Lecce and Bari had been promoted from Serie B. They all will be relegated and as of 2025-26 season, the only time in history that all promoted teams were relegated in Serie A.

== Events ==
Italy arrived at the top of the UEFA ranking.

== Final classification ==
| Pos | Team | Pld | W | D | L | GF | GA | GD | Pts | Qualification or relegation |
|---|---|---|---|---|---|---|---|---|---|---|
| 1 | Juventus (C) | 30 | 18 | 9 | 3 | 43 | 17 | +26 | 45 | Qualification to European Cup |
| 2 | Roma | 30 | 19 | 3 | 8 | 51 | 27 | +24 | 41 | Qualification to Cup Winners' Cup |
| 3 | Napoli | 30 | 14 | 11 | 5 | 35 | 21 | +14 | 39 | Qualification to UEFA Cup |
| 4 | Torino | 30 | 11 | 11 | 8 | 31 | 26 | +5 | 33 | Qualification to UEFA Cup |
| 5 | Fiorentina | 30 | 10 | 13 | 7 | 29 | 23 | +6 | 33 | Qualification to UEFA Cup |
| 6 | Internazionale | 30 | 12 | 8 | 10 | 36 | 33 | +3 | 32 | Qualification to UEFA Cup |
| 7 | Milan | 30 | 10 | 11 | 9 | 26 | 24 | +2 | 31 | |
| 8 | Atalanta | 30 | 7 | 15 | 8 | 27 | 26 | +1 | 29 | |
| 9 | Como | 30 | 7 | 15 | 8 | 32 | 32 | 0 | 29 | |
| 10 | Hellas Verona | 30 | 9 | 10 | 11 | 31 | 40 | −9 | 28 | |
| 11 | Avellino | 30 | 9 | 9 | 12 | 28 | 38 | −10 | 27 | |
| 12 | Sampdoria | 30 | 8 | 11 | 11 | 27 | 25 | +2 | 27 | |
| 13 | Udinese | 30 | 6 | 13 | 11 | 31 | 37 | −6 | 25 | |
| 14 | Pisa (R) | 30 | 5 | 13 | 12 | 27 | 40 | −13 | 23 | Relegation to Serie B |
| 15 | Bari (R) | 30 | 5 | 12 | 13 | 18 | 31 | −13 | 22 | Relegation to Serie B |
| 16 | Lecce (R) | 30 | 5 | 6 | 19 | 23 | 55 | −32 | 16 | Relegation to Serie B |

Source: RSSSF.com
Rules for classification: 1) Points; 2) Head-to-head points; 3) Head-to-head goal difference; 4) Goal difference; 5) Goals scored; 6) Draw. (Note: Head-to-head record is used only after all the matches between the teams in question have been played).
(C) Champions; (R) Relegated

== Results ==
| Home \ Away | ATA | AVE | BAR | COM | FIO | INT | JUV | LEC | MIL | NAP | PIS | ROM | SAM | TOR | UDI | VER |
|---|---|---|---|---|---|---|---|---|---|---|---|---|---|---|---|---|
| Atalanta | — | 2–0 | 0–0 | 1–1 | 0–0 | 2–1 | 0–0 | 3–1 | 1–1 | 0–0 | 1–2 | 1–2 | 2–1 | 2–2 | 1–1 | 0–0 |
| Avellino | 1–0 | — | 0–0 | 1–4 | 3–1 | 1–0 | 0–0 | 2–0 | 1–1 | 0–1 | 1–1 | 1–0 | 2–1 | 0–0 | 2–2 | 3–1 |
| Bari | 0–0 | 0–1 | — | 1–1 | 0–1 | 1–3 | 0–3 | 2–0 | 0–1 | 1–2 | 0–0 | 2–0 | 0–0 | 1–0 | 1–0 | 3–1 |
| Como | 0–2 | 1–1 | 1–1 | — | 0–0 | 1–0 | 0–1 | 2–0 | 1–1 | 1–1 | 1–1 | 1–0 | 2–2 | 1–1 | 0–0 | 1–0 |
| Fiorentina | 0–0 | 1–0 | 0–0 | 1–0 | — | 3–0 | 2–0 | 3–1 | 2–0 | 0–0 | 1–1 | 1–1 | 1–0 | 0–0 | 1–0 | 0–0 |
| Internazionale | 1–3 | 3–1 | 1–0 | 3–2 | 2–0 | — | 1–1 | 3–0 | 1–0 | 1–1 | 3–1 | 2–1 | 1–0 | 3–3 | 2–1 | 0–0 |
| Juventus | 2–0 | 1–0 | 4–0 | 0–0 | 1–0 | 2–0 | — | 4–0 | 1–0 | 1–1 | 3–1 | 3–1 | 1–0 | 1–1 | 2–1 | 3–0 |
| Lecce | 2–1 | 2–2 | 1–1 | 1–4 | 2–1 | 0–1 | 2–3 | — | 0–2 | 0–0 | 1–1 | 0–3 | 0–1 | 0–0 | 2–0 | 1–0 |
| Milan | 1–1 | 3–0 | 0–0 | 1–0 | 1–0 | 2–2 | 0–0 | 1–0 | — | 1–2 | 1–0 | 0–1 | 2–2 | 1–0 | 2–0 | 1–1 |
| Napoli | 1–0 | 1–0 | 1–0 | 2–1 | 0–0 | 1–0 | 1–0 | 1–0 | 2–0 | — | 0–1 | 1–1 | 3–0 | 3–1 | 1–1 | 5–0 |
| Pisa | 1–1 | 1–1 | 1–1 | 4–1 | 1–2 | 1–0 | 1–1 | 3–0 | 0–1 | 1–1 | — | 2–4 | 0–2 | 0–0 | 0–0 | 0–1 |
| Roma | 4–0 | 5–1 | 2–1 | 0–0 | 2–1 | 3–1 | 3–0 | 2–3 | 2–1 | 2–0 | 1–0 | — | 1–0 | 2–0 | 1–0 | 2–1 |
| Sampdoria | 0–0 | 0–2 | 2–0 | 0–0 | 2–2 | 0–0 | 0–0 | 2–0 | 1–1 | 2–0 | 3–0 | 1–0 | — | 0–0 | 3–0 | 0–0 |
| Torino | 0–0 | 1–0 | 1–0 | 1–3 | 2–1 | 1–0 | 1–2 | 3–1 | 2–0 | 2–1 | 4–1 | 0–1 | 1–0 | — | 2–0 | 2–1 |
| Udinese | 1–0 | 3–1 | 2–2 | 2–2 | 2–2 | 1–1 | 1–2 | 2–1 | 0–0 | 2–0 | 1–1 | 0–2 | 2–1 | 0–0 | — | 5–1 |
| Hellas Verona | 0–3 | 2–0 | 2–0 | 3–0 | 2–2 | 0–0 | 0–1 | 2–2 | 1–0 | 2–2 | 3–0 | 3–2 | 2–1 | 1–0 | 1–1 | — |

Legend: Blue = home team win; Yellow = draw; Red = away team win.

== Top goalscorers ==
| Rank | Player | Club | Goals |
|---|---|---|---|
| 1 | (Italy) Roberto Pruzzo | Roma | 19 |
| 2 | (Germany) Karl-Heinz Rummenigge | Internazionale | 13 |
| 3 | (France) Michel Platini | Juventus | 12 |
| 4 | (Argentina) Diego Maradona | Napoli | 11 |
| 4 | (Argentina) Daniel Passarella | Fiorentina | 11 |
| 4 | (Italy) Aldo Serena | Juventus | 11 |
| 7 | (Italy) Stefano Borgonovo | Como | 10 |
| 7 | (Argentina) Ramon Diaz | Avellino | 10 |
| 7 | (Italy) Bruno Giordano | Napoli | 10 |
| 10 | (Italy) Alessandro Altobelli | Internazionale | 9 |
| 10 | (Italy) Aldo Cantarutti | Atalanta | 9 |
| 10 | (Italy) Andrea Carnevale | Udinese | 9 |
| 10 | (Denmark) Preben Elkjær | Hellas Verona | 9 |
| 14 | (England) Mark Hateley | Milan | 8 |

== Attendances ==
| No. | Club | Average |
|---|---|---|
| 1 | Napoli | 71,454 |
| 2 | Milan | 56,782 |
| 3 | Internazionale | 53,622 |
| 4 | Roma | 50,151 |
| 5 | Fiorentina | 40,467 |
| 6 | Juventus | 39,654 |
| 7 | Udinese | 32,464 |
| 8 | Lecce | 31,349 |
| 9 | Torino | 29,871 |
| 10 | Hellas Verona | 29,002 |
| 11 | Bari | 28,130 |
| 12 | Atalanta | 26,720 |
| 13 | Sampdoria | 26,296 |
| 14 | Avellino | 24,644 |
| 15 | Pisa | 18,756 |
| 16 | Como | 14,751 |

== References and sources ==
- Almanacco Illustrato del Calcio - La Storia 1898-2004, Panini Edizioni, Modena, September 2005
