= 1984–85 European Cup =

European football tournament

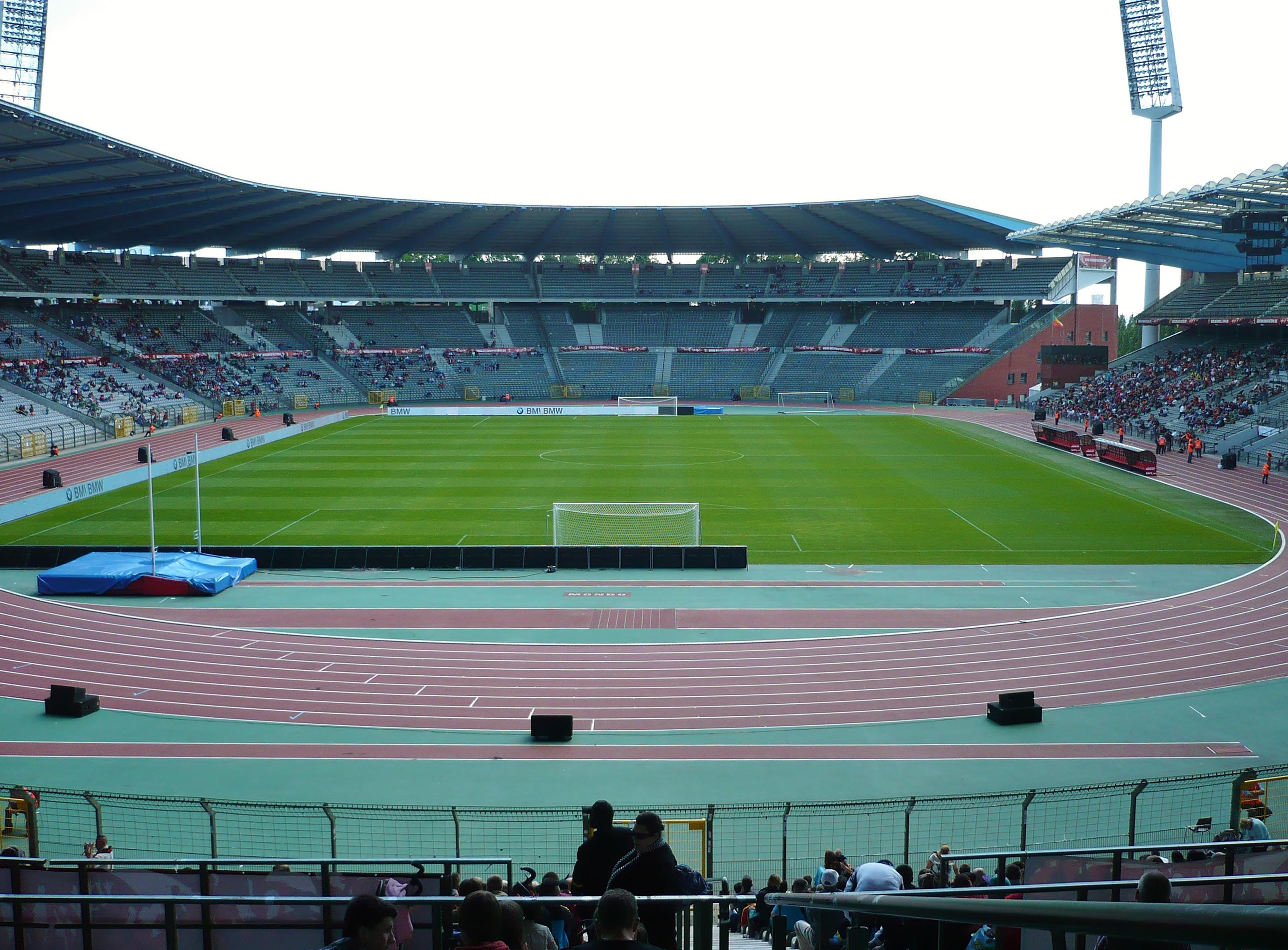
- The Heysel Stadium in Brussels hosted the final.

Tournament details
- Dates: 19 September 1984 – 29 May 1985
- Teams: 32

Final positions
- Champions: (Italy) Juventus (1st title)
- Runners-up: (England) Liverpool

Tournament statistics
- Matches played: 61
- Goals scored: 186 (3.05 per match)
- Attendance: 1,546,110 (25,346 per match)
- Top scorer(s): Torbjörn Nilsson (IFK Göteborg); Michel Platini (Juventus); 7 goals each

The 1984–85 European Cup was the 30th season of the European Cup, UEFA's premier club football competition. The tournament was won for the first time by Juventus in a 1–0 win against defending champions Liverpool. Juventus became the first club to have won all three major European trophies at the time (European Cup/UEFA Champions League, UEFA Cup/UEFA Europa League, and the Cup Winners' Cup), as well a posteriori as the one that needed the shortest amount of time to complete this (8 years).

This edition of the tournament was overshadowed by the Heysel Stadium disaster that happened prior to the final match. Following the disaster, English clubs received a five-year ban from entering any European competition, thus ending a period of great success for English clubs in the European Cup which had seen three clubs winning seven finals since 1977, including six successive finals up to 1982. Liverpool, English champions in 1989–90, were given an extra year's ban.

== Teams ==
| (Albania) Labinoti (1st) | Austria Wien (1st) | (Belgium) Beveren (1st) | (Bulgaria) Levski-Spartak (1st) |
| (Cyprus) Omonia (1st) | (Czechoslovakia) Sparta Praha (1st) | (Denmark) Lyngby (1st) | (England) Liverpool (1st)^{TH} |
| (Finland) Ilves (1st) | (France) Bordeaux (1st) | (East Germany) BFC Dynamo (1st) | (West Germany) VfB Stuttgart (1st) |
| (Greece) Panathinaikos (1st) | (Hungary) Budapesti Honvéd (1st) | (Iceland) ÍA (1st) | (Republic of Ireland) Shamrock Rovers (1st) |
| (Italy) Juventus (1st) | (Luxembourg) Avenir Beggen (1st) | (Malta) Valletta (1st) | (Netherlands) Feyenoord (1st) |
| (Northern Ireland) Linfield (1st) | (Norway) Vålerenga (1st) | (Poland) Lech Poznań (1st) | (Portugal) Benfica (1st) |
| (Romania) Dinamo București (1st) | (Scotland) Aberdeen (1st) | (Spain) Athletic Bilbao (1st) | (Sweden) Gothenburg (1st) |
| (Switzerland) Grasshopper (1st) | (Turkey) Trabzonspor (1st) | (Soviet Union) Dnipro Dnipropetrovsk (1st) | (Socialist Federal Republic of Yugoslavia) Red Star Belgrade (1st) |

== Bracket ==
First round
(Scotland) Aberdeen | 2 | 1 | 3 (4)
(East Germany) BFC Dynamo | 1 | 2 | 3 (5)
Austria Wien | 4 | 4 | 8
(Malta) Valletta | 0 | 0 | 0
(Poland) Lech Poznań | 0 | 0 | 0
(England) Liverpool | 1 | 4 | 5
(Socialist Federal Republic of Yugoslavia) Crvena zvezda | 3 | 0 | 3
(Portugal) Benfica | 2 | 2 | 4
(Luxembourg) Avenir Beggen | 0 | 0 | 0
(Sweden) IFK Göteborg | 8 | 9 | 17
(Iceland) ÍA | 2 | 0 | 2
(Belgium) Beveren | 2 | 5 | 7
(Netherlands) Feyenoord | 0 | 1 | 1
(Greece) Panathinaikos | 0 | 2 | 2
(Northern Ireland) Linfield (a) | 0 | 1 | 1
(Republic of Ireland) Shamrock Rovers | 0 | 1 | 1
(Finland) Ilves | 0 | 1 | 1
(Italy) Juventus | 4 | 2 | 6
(Switzerland) Grasshopper | 3 | 1 | 4
(Hungary) Honvéd | 1 | 2 | 3
(Norway) Vålerenga | 3 | 0 | 3
(Czechoslovakia) Sparta Praha | 3 | 2 | 5
(Albania) Labinoti | 0 | 0 | 0
(Denmark) Lyngby | 3 | 3 | 6
(France) Bordeaux | 3 | 0 | 3
(Spain) Athletic Bilbao | 2 | 0 | 2
(Romania) Dinamo București | 4 | 1 | 6
(Cyprus) Omonia | 1 | 2 | 3
(Bulgaria) Levski Sofia (a) | 1 | 2 | 3
(West Germany) Stuttgart | 1 | 2 | 3
(Turkey) Trabzonspor | 1 | 0 | 1
(Soviet Union) Dnipro | 0 | 3 | 3

Second round
(East Germany) BFC Dynamo | 3 | 1 | 4
Austria Wien | 3 | 2 | 5
(England) Liverpool | 3 | 0 | 3
(Portugal) Benfica | 1 | 1 | 2
(Sweden) IFK Göteborg (a) | 1 | 1 | 2
(Belgium) Beveren | 0 | 2 | 2
(Greece) Panathinaikos | 2 | 3 | 5
(Northern Ireland) Linfield | 1 | 3 | 4
(Italy) Juventus | 2 | 4 | 6
(Switzerland) Grasshopper | 0 | 2 | 2
(Czechoslovakia) Sparta Praha | 0 | 2 | 2
(Denmark) Lyngby | 0 | 1 | 1
(France) Bordeaux | 1 | 1 | 2
(Romania) Dinamo București | 0 | 1 | 1
(Bulgaria) Levski Sofia | 3 | 0 | 3
(Soviet Union) Dnipro (a) | 1 | 2 | 3

Quarter-finals
Austria Wien | 1 | 1 | 2
(England) Liverpool | 1 | 4 | 5
(Sweden) IFK Göteborg | 0 | 2 | 2
(Greece) Panathinaikos | 1 | 2 | 3
(Italy) Juventus | 3 | 0 | 3
(Czechoslovakia) Sparta Praha | 0 | 1 | 1
(France) Bordeaux | 1 | 1 | 2 (5)
(Soviet Union) Dnipro | 1 | 1 | 2 (3)

Semi-finals
(England) Liverpool | 4 | 1 | 5
(Greece) Panathinaikos | 0 | 0 | 0
(Italy) Juventus | 3 | 0 | 3
(France) Bordeaux | 0 | 2 | 2

Final
(England) Liverpool | 0
(Italy) Juventus | 1

== First round ==
| Team 1 | Agg. | Team 2 | 1st leg | 2nd leg |
|---|---|---|---|---|
| Ilves (Finland) | 1–6 | (Italy) Juventus | 0–4 | 1–2 |
| Grasshopper (Switzerland) | 4–3 | (Hungary) Budapesti Honvéd | 3–1 | 1–2 |
| Vålerenga (Norway) | 3–5 | (Czechoslovakia) Sparta Praha | 3–3 | 0–2 |
| Labinoti (Albania) | 0–6 | (Denmark) Lyngby | 0–3 | 0–3 |
| Bordeaux (France) | 3–2 | (Spain) Athletic Bilbao | 3–2 | 0–0 |
| Dinamo București (Romania) | 5–3 | (Cyprus) Omonia | 4–1 | 1–2 |
| Levski-Spartak (Bulgaria) | 3–3 (a) | (West Germany) VfB Stuttgart | 1–1 | 2–2 |
| Trabzonspor (Turkey) | 1–3 | (Soviet Union) Dnipro Dnipropetrovsk | 1–0 | 0–3 |
| Aberdeen (Scotland) | 3–3 (4–5p) | (East Germany) BFC Dynamo | 2–1 | 1–2 |
| Austria Wien | 8–0 | (Malta) Valletta | 4–0 | 4–0 |
| Lech Poznań (Poland) | 0–5 | (England) Liverpool | 0–1 | 0–4 |
| Red Star Belgrade (Socialist Federal Republic of Yugoslavia) | 3–4 | (Portugal) Benfica | 3–2 | 0–2 |
| Avenir Beggen (Luxembourg) | 0–17 | (Sweden) IFK Göteborg | 0–8 | 0–9 |
| ÍA (Iceland) | 2–7 | (Belgium) Beveren | 2–2 | 0–5 |
| Feyenoord (Netherlands) | 1–2 | (Greece) Panathinaikos | 0–0 | 1–2 |
| Linfield (Northern Ireland) | 1–1 (a) | (Republic of Ireland) Shamrock Rovers | 0–0 | 1–1 |

=== First leg ===
19 September 1984
14:00

| Trabzonspor (Turkey) | 1–0 | (Soviet Union) Dnipro Dnipropetrovsk |
|---|---|---|
| Lemi 8' | Report |

Hüseyin Avni Aker Stadyumu, Trabzon
Attendance: 9,800
Referee: Dušan Krchňák (Czechoslovakia)

19 September 1984
16:00

| Dinamo București (Romania) | 4–1 | (Cyprus) Omonia |
|---|---|---|
| Orac 25', 35'; Tulba 28'; Ţălnar 33' | Report | Savvidis 17' |

Stadionul Dinamo, Bucharest
Attendance: 17,000
Referee: Stojan Ilievski (Yugoslavia)

19 September 1984
16:00

| Lech Poznań (Poland) | 0–1 | (England) Liverpool |
|---|---|---|
| | Report | Wark 62' |

Stadion Miejski w Poznaniu, Poznań
Attendance: 29,000
Referee: Kjell Johansson (Sweden)

19 September 1984
16:15

| Labinoti (Albania) | 0–3 | (Denmark) Lyngby |
|---|---|---|
| | Report | Vilmar 52'; Spangsborg 62'; Schäfer 80' |

Stadiumi Ruzhdi Bizhuta, Elbasan
Attendance: 15,000
Referee: Lajos Németh (Hungary)

19 September 1984
17:30

| Vålerenga (Norway) | 3–3 | (Czechoslovakia) Sparta Praha |
|---|---|---|
| P. Jacobsen 33', 89'; Bergsvand 80' | Report | Procházka 22', 49'; Chovanec 36' |

Bislett stadion, Oslo
Attendance: 2,489
Referee: Þorvarður Björnsson (Iceland)

19 September 1984
17:30

| Red Star Belgrade (Socialist Federal Republic of Yugoslavia) | 3–2 | (Portugal) Benfica |
|---|---|---|
| Janjanin 57' (pen.), 77' (pen.), 78' | Report | Elsner 27' (o.g.); Diamantino 42' |

Marakana, Belgrade
Attendance: 63,542
Referee: André Daina (Switzerland)

19 September 1984
18:00

| Ilves (Finland) | 0–4 | (Italy) Juventus |
|---|---|---|
| | Report | Rossi 12', 82', 89'; Platini 44' (pen.) |

Ratina Stadium, Tampere
Attendance: 24,073
Referee: Hans Harrysson (Sweden)

19 September 1984
18:00

| Levski-Spartak (Bulgaria) | 1–1 | (West Germany) VfB Stuttgart |
|---|---|---|
| Kurdov 64' | Report | Reichert 62' |

Stadion Georgi Asparuhov, Sofia
Attendance: 23,000
Referee: Keith Hackett (England)

19 September 1984
19:00

| ÍA (Iceland) | 2–2 | (Belgium) Beveren |
|---|---|---|
| K. Þórðarson 73'; Hákonarson 80' | Report | Albert 53'; Christiaens 54' |

Laugardalsvöllur, Reykjavík
Attendance: 2,889
Referee: Jack Poucher (Northern Ireland)

19 September 1984
19:30

| Austria Wien | 4–0 | (Malta) Valletta |
|---|---|---|
| Prohaska 18'; Polster 25'; Drabits 42', 47' | Report |

Franz-Horr-Stadion, Vienna
Attendance: 6,200
Referee: Jean Koster (Luxembourg)

19 September 1984
19:30

| Avenir Beggen (Luxembourg) | 0–8 | (Sweden) IFK Göteborg |
|---|---|---|
| | Report | Carlsson 4', 62'; T. Nilsson 20', 47', 75'; Fredriksson 22', 70' (pen.); Andersson 84' |

Stade de Beggen, Luxembourg City
Attendance: 702
Referee: Henning Lund-Sørensen (Denmark)

19 September 1984
20:00

| Grasshopper (Switzerland) | 3–1 | (Hungary) Budapesti Honvéd |
|---|---|---|
| Jara 31'; Müller 68', 72' | Report | Dajka 30' |

Hardturm, Zürich
Attendance: 4,467
Referee: José Pes Pérez (Spain)

19 September 1984
20:00

| Feyenoord (Netherlands) | 0–0 | (Greece) Panathinaikos |
|---|---|---|
| | Report |

De Kuip, Rotterdam
Attendance: 38,542
Referee: Neil Midgley (England)

19 September 1984
20:30

| Bordeaux (France) | 3–2 | (Spain) Athletic Bilbao |
|---|---|---|
| Müller 29'; Battiston 61'; Lacombe 80' | Report | Endika 31'; Salinas 70' |

Stade du Parc Lescure, Bordeaux
Attendance: 23,989
Referee: Paolo Casarin (Italy)

19 September 1984
20:30

| Aberdeen (Scotland) | 2–1 | (East Germany) BFC Dynamo |
|---|---|---|
| Black 32', 67' | Report | Schulz 82' |

Pittodrie Stadium, Aberdeen
Attendance: 19,769
Referee: Marcel Van Langenhove (Belgium)

19 September 1984
21:00

| Linfield (Northern Ireland) | 0–0 | (Republic of Ireland) Shamrock Rovers |
|---|---|---|
| | Report |

Windsor Park, Belfast
Attendance: 4,907
Referee: David Syme (Scotland)

=== Second leg ===
3 October 1984
14:00

| Budapesti Honvéd (Hungary) | 2–1 | (Switzerland) Grasshopper |
|---|---|---|
| Dajka 44'; Varga 52' (pen.) | Report | Ponte 13' |

Szent Imre herceg útjai Stadion, Budapest
Attendance: 6,483
Referee: Franz Wöhrer (Austria)

Grasshopper won 4–3 on aggregate.

3 October 1984
15:00

| Valletta (Malta) | 0–4 | Austria Wien |
|---|---|---|
| | Report | Degeorgi 8'; Steinkogler 52'; Ogris 66', 67' |

Ta' Qali National Stadium, Ta' Qali
Attendance: 1,509
Referee: Franz Gächter (Switzerland)

Austria Wien won 8–0 on aggregate.

3 October 1984
15:30

| Shamrock Rovers (Republic of Ireland) | 1–1 | (Northern Ireland) Linfield |
|---|---|---|
| Eccles 66' | Report | Jeffrey 30' |

Glenmalure Park, Dublin
Attendance: 2,200
Referee: Howard King (Wales)

1–1 on aggregate; Linfield won on away goals.

3 October 1984
17:00

| Sparta Praha (Czechoslovakia) | 2–0 | (Norway) Vålerenga |
|---|---|---|
| Denk 42'; Straka 44' | Report |

Stadion Letná, Prague
Attendance: 11,872
Referee: Kostas Dimitriadis (Greece)

Sparta Praha won 5–3 on aggregate.

3 October 1984
17:00

| BFC Dynamo (East Germany) | 2–1 (a.e.t.) | (Scotland) Aberdeen |
|---|---|---|
| Thom 50'; Ernst 84' | Report | Angus 68' |
Penalties
| Ernst (penalty scored); Rohde (penalty scored); Schulz (penalty missed); Troppa (penalty scored); Terletzki (penalty scored); Trieloff (penalty scored) | 5–4 | (penalty scored) Porteous; (penalty scored) McQueen; (penalty scored) Hewitt; (penalty scored) Stark; (penalty missed) Miller; (penalty missed) Black |

Friedrich-Ludwig-Jahn-Stadion, East Berlin
Attendance: 19,985-25,000
Referee: Luigi Agnolin (Italy)

3–3 on aggregate; BFC Dynamo won 5–4 on penalties.

3 October 1984
19:00

| Dnipro Dnipropetrovsk (Soviet Union) | 3–0 | (Turkey) Trabzonspor |
|---|---|---|
| Lytovchenko 46', 67'; Necati 89' (o.g.) | Report |

Stadion Metalurh, Kryvyi Rih (Note: Dnipro Dnipropetrovsk played their home matches at Stadion Metalurh, Kryvyi Rih, instead of their regular stadium Meteor Stadium, Dnipropetrovsk, as Dnipropetrovsk was a closed city for foreigners.)
Attendance: 25,400
Referee: Einar Halle (Norway)

Dnipro Dnipropetrovsk won 3–1 on aggregate.

3 October 1984
19:00

| Lyngby (Denmark) | 3–0 | (Albania) Labinoti |
|---|---|---|
| F. Christensen 59'; Sørensen 62'; Spangsborg 89' | Report |

Lyngby Stadion, Kongens Lyngby
Attendance: 2,021
Referee: Osmo Orakangas (Finland)

Lyngby won 6–0 on aggregate.

3 October 1984
19:00

| IFK Göteborg (Sweden) | 9–0 | (Luxembourg) Avenir Beggen |
|---|---|---|
| Pettersson 24', 30'; T. Nilsson 28', 37'; Tommy Holmgren 50'; Fredriksson 64'; Gardner 70', 81'; Carlsson 75' | Report |

Ullevi, Gothenburg
Attendance: 6,072
Referee: Henning Lund-Sørensen (Denmark)

IFK Göteborg won 17–0 on aggregate.

3 October 1984
19:30

| Omonia (Cyprus) | 2–1 | (Romania) Dinamo București |
|---|---|---|
| Dzhevizov 54'; Mavris 62' | Report | Movilă 88' |

Makario Stadio, Nicosia
Attendance: 13,650
Referee: Ivan Yosifov (Bulgaria)

Dinamo Bucharest won 5–3 on aggregate.

3 October 1984
20:00

| VfB Stuttgart (West Germany) | 2–2 | (Bulgaria) Levski-Spartak |
|---|---|---|
| Allgöwer 14', 38' | Report | Iliev 29'; Tsvetkov 60' |

Neckarstadion, Stuttgart
Attendance: 22,000
Referee: Horst Brummeier (Austria)

3–3 on aggregate; Levski-Spartak won on away goals.

3 October 1984
20:00

| Beveren (Belgium) | 5–0 | (Iceland) ÍA |
|---|---|---|
| Albert 20'; Schönberger 30'; Theunis 49'; Christiaens 72'; Gorez 87' | Report |

Freethiel, Beveren
Attendance: 7,000
Referee: Charles Gilson (Luxembourg)

Beveren won 7–2 on aggregate.

3 October 1984
20:00

| Panathinaikos (Greece) | 2–1 | (Netherlands) Feyenoord |
|---|---|---|
| Mavridis 41'; Rocha 43' | Report | Rep 69' |

Olympiako Stadio O.A.K.A., Athens
Attendance: 73,991
Referee: Vojtech Christov (Czechoslovakia)

Panathinaikos won 2–1 on aggregate.

3 October 1984
20:30

| Juventus (Italy) | 2–1 | (Finland) Ilves |
|---|---|---|
| Platini 57', 65' | Report | Kuuluvainen 19' |

Stadio Comunale, Turin
Attendance: 3,232
Referee: Charles Scerri (Malta)

Juventus won 6–1 on aggregate.

3 October 1984
20:30

| Athletic Bilbao (Spain) | 0–0 | (France) Bordeaux |
|---|---|---|
| | Report |

Estadio San Mamés, Bilbao
Attendance: 36,000
Referee: Alexis Ponnet (Belgium)

Bordeaux won 3–2 on aggregate.

3 October 1984
20:30

| Liverpool (England) | 4–0 | (Poland) Lech Poznań |
|---|---|---|
| Wark 16', 20', 86'; Walsh 35' | Report |

Anfield, Liverpool
Attendance: 22,143
Referee: Gerard Geurds (Netherlands)

Liverpool won 5–0 on aggregate.

3 October 1984
22:00

| Benfica (Portugal) | 2–0 | (Socialist Federal Republic of Yugoslavia) Red Star Belgrade |
|---|---|---|
| Carlos Manuel 74', 80' | Report |

Estádio da Luz, Lisbon
Attendance: 32,000
Referee: Dieter Pauly (West Germany)

Benfica won 4–3 on aggregate.

== Second round ==
| Team 1 | Agg. | Team 2 | 1st leg | 2nd leg |
|---|---|---|---|---|
| Juventus (Italy) | 6–2 | (Switzerland) Grasshopper | 2–0 | 4–2 |
| Sparta Praha (Czechoslovakia) | 2–1 | (Denmark) Lyngby | 0–0 | 2–1 |
| Bordeaux (France) | 2–1 | (Romania) Dinamo București | 1–0 | 1–1 |
| Levski-Spartak (Bulgaria) | 3–3 (a) | (Soviet Union) Dnipro Dnipropetrovsk | 3–1 | 0–2 |
| BFC Dynamo (East Germany) | 4–5 | Austria Wien | 3–3 | 1–2 |
| Liverpool (England) | 3–2 | (Portugal) Benfica | 3–1 | 0–1 |
| IFK Göteborg (Sweden) | 2–2 (a) | (Belgium) Beveren | 1–0 | 1–2 |
| Panathinaikos (Greece) | 5–4 | (Northern Ireland) Linfield | 2–1 | 3–3 |

=== First leg ===
24 October 1984
17:00

| Sparta Praha (Czechoslovakia) | 0–0 | (Denmark) Lyngby |
|---|---|---|
| | Report |

Stadion Letná, Prague
Attendance: 13,712
Referee: Oliver Donnelly (Northern Ireland)

24 October 1984
17:00

| BFC Dynamo (East Germany) | 3–3 | Austria Wien |
|---|---|---|
| Thom 7', 52'; Pastor 88' | Report | Steinkogler 36'; Polster 42'; Nyilasi 60' |

Friedrich-Ludwig-Jahn-Stadion, East Berlin
Attendance: 19,825-21,000
Referee: Emilio Soriano Aladrén (Spain)

24 October 1984
18:30

| Levski-Spartak (Bulgaria) | 3–1 | (Soviet Union) Dnipro Dnipropetrovsk |
|---|---|---|
| Velev 31'; Valchev 45'; Sirakov 67' | Report | Lytovchenko 24' |

Georgi Asparukhov Stadion, Sofia
Attendance: 30,000
Referee: Mircea Salomir (Romania)

24 October 1984
19:00

| IFK Göteborg (Sweden) | 1–0 | (Belgium) Beveren |
|---|---|---|
| T. Nilsson 51' | Report |

Ullevi, Gothenburg
Attendance: 16,718
Referee: Arto Ravander (Finland)

24 October 1984
19:00

| Panathinaikos (Greece) | 2–1 | (Northern Ireland) Linfield |
|---|---|---|
| Charalambidis 42' (pen.); Tarasis 88' | Report | Totten 20' |

Olympiako Stadio O.A.K.A., Athens
Attendance: 51,985
Referee: Lajos Németh (Hungary)

24 October 1984
20:30

| Juventus (Italy) | 2–0 | (Switzerland) Grasshopper |
|---|---|---|
| Vignola 26'; Rossi 28' | Report |

Stadio Comunale, Turin
Attendance: 39,804
Referee: Bob Valentine (Scotland)

24 October 1984
20:30

| Bordeaux (France) | 1–0 | (Romania) Dinamo București |
|---|---|---|
| Müller 35' | Report |

Stade du Parc Lescure, Bordeaux
Attendance: 28,663
Referee: Franz Wöhrer (Austria)

24 October 1984
20:30

| Liverpool (England) | 3–1 | (Portugal) Benfica |
|---|---|---|
| Rush 44', 71', 77' | Report | Diamantino 51' |

Anfield, Liverpool
Attendance: 27,733
Referee: Marcel Van Langenhove (Belgium)

=== Second leg ===
7 November 1984
17:00

| Dnipro Dnipropetrovsk (Soviet Union) | 2–0 | (Bulgaria) Levski-Spartak |
|---|---|---|
| Taran 11'; Kuznetsov 24' | Report |

Stadion Metalurh, Kryvyi Rih
Attendance: 25,480
Referee: Siegfried Kirschen (East Germany)

3–3 on aggregate; Dnipro Dnipropetrovsk won on away goals.

7 November 1984
17:00

| Dinamo București (Romania) | 1–1 (a.e.t.) | (France) Bordeaux |
|---|---|---|
| Dragnea 9' | Report | Lacombe 113' |

Stadionul 23 August, Bucharest
Attendance: 60,000
Referee: Brian McGinlay (Scotland)

Bordeaux won 2–1 on aggregate.

7 November 1984
19:00

| Lyngby (Denmark) | 1–2 | (Czechoslovakia) Sparta Praha |
|---|---|---|
| Vilmar 27' | Report | Procházka 81'; Griga 88' |

Idrætsparken, Copenhagen
Attendance: 10,300
Referee: Einar Halle (Norway)

Sparta Praha won 2–1 on aggregate.

7 November 1984
19:30

| Austria Wien | 2–1 | (East Germany) BFC Dynamo |
|---|---|---|
| Prohaska 6' (pen.); Nyilasi 65' | Report | Trieloff 46' |

Gerhard-Hanappi-Stadion, Vienna
Attendance: 9,700
Referee: Jan Keizer (Netherlands)

Austria Wien won 5–4 on aggregate.

7 November 1984
20:00

| Grasshopper (Switzerland) | 2–4 | (Italy) Juventus |
|---|---|---|
| Koller 30'; Schällibaum 71' | Report | Briaschi 21'; Vignola 40'; Platini 61', 85' (pen.) |

Letzigrund, Zürich
Attendance: 25,000
Referee: Erik Fredriksson (Sweden)

Juventus won 6–2 on aggregate.

7 November 1984
20:00

| Beveren (Belgium) | 2–1 (a.e.t.) | (Sweden) IFK Göteborg |
|---|---|---|
| Crève 76'; Gorez 100' (pen.) | Report | Pettersson 99' |

Freethiel, Beveren
Attendance: 13,000
Referee: José Rosa dos Santos (Portugal)

2–2 on aggregate; IFK Göteborg won on away goals.

7 November 1984
21:00

| Linfield (Northern Ireland) | 3–3 | (Greece) Panathinaikos |
|---|---|---|
| McGaughey 6', 26' (pen.); Maxwell 10' | Report | Saravakos 29' (pen.); Rocha 33'; Antoniou 63' |

Windsor Park, Belfast
Attendance: 7,269
Referee: Peer Frickmann (Denmark)

Panathinaikos won 5–4 on aggregate.

7 November 1984
21:30

| Benfica (Portugal) | 1–0 | (England) Liverpool |
|---|---|---|
| Manniche 6' (pen.) | Report |

Estádio da Luz, Lisbon
Attendance: 21,000
Referee: Michel Vautrot (France)

Liverpool won 3–2 on aggregate.

== Quarter-finals ==
| Team 1 | Agg. | Team 2 | 1st leg | 2nd leg |
|---|---|---|---|---|
| Juventus (Italy) | 3–1 | (Czechoslovakia) Sparta Praha | 3–0 | 0–1 |
| Bordeaux (France) | 2–2 (5–3p) | (Soviet Union) Dnipro Dnipropetrovsk | 1–1 | 1–1 |
| Austria Wien | 2–5 | (England) Liverpool | 1–1 | 1–4 |
| IFK Göteborg (Sweden) | 2–3 | (Greece) Panathinaikos | 0–1 | 2–2 |

=== First leg ===
6 March 1985
19:00

| IFK Göteborg (Sweden) | 0–1 | (Greece) Panathinaikos |
|---|---|---|
| | Report | Saravakos 50' (pen.) |

Ullevi, Gothenburg
Attendance: 40,026
Referee: Brian McGinlay (Scotland)

6 March 1985
19:30

| Austria Wien | 1–1 | (England) Liverpool |
|---|---|---|
| Polster 23' | Report | Nicol 86' |

Gerhard-Hanappi-Stadion, Vienna
Attendance: 19,000
Referee: Bogdan Dochev (Bulgaria)

6 March 1985
20:30

| Juventus (Italy) | 3–0 | (Czechoslovakia) Sparta Praha |
|---|---|---|
| Tardelli 35'; Rossi 64'; Briaschi 81' | Report |

Stadio Comunale, Turin
Attendance: 45,455
Referee: Adolf Prokop (East Germany)

6 March 1985
20:30

| Bordeaux (France) | 1–1 | (Soviet Union) Dnipro Dnipropetrovsk |
|---|---|---|
| Lacombe 10' | Report | Lyutyi 42' |

Stade du Parc Lescure, Bordeaux
Attendance: 35,067
Referee: Jan Keizer (Netherlands)

=== Second leg ===
20 March 1985
16:30

| Sparta Praha (Czechoslovakia) | 1–0 | (Italy) Juventus |
|---|---|---|
| Berger 77' (pen.) | Report |

Stadion Letná, Prague
Attendance: 33,070
Referee: Keith Hackett (England)

Juventus won 3–1 on aggregate.

20 March 1985
19:00

| Dnipro Dnipropetrovsk (Soviet Union) | 1–1 (a.e.t.) | (France) Bordeaux |
|---|---|---|
| Lysenko 12' | Report | Tusseau 75' |
Penalties
| Lytovchenko (penalty missed); Lysenko (penalty scored); Kuznetsov (penalty scored); Puchkov (penalty scored) | 3–5 | (penalty scored) Battiston; (penalty scored) Giresse; (penalty scored) Lacombe; (penalty scored) Specht; (penalty scored) Chalana |

Stadion Metalurh, Kryvyi Rih
Attendance: 35,000
Referee: Karl-Heinz Tritschler (West Germany)

2–2 on aggregate; Bordeaux won 5–3 on penalties.

20 March 1985
19:00

| Panathinaikos (Greece) | 2–2 | (Sweden) IFK Göteborg |
|---|---|---|
| Dimopoulos 44'; Saravakos 78' (pen.) | Report | T. Nilsson 11'; Tord Holmgren 53' |

Olympiako Stadio O.A.K.A., Athens
Attendance: 74,130
Referee: Volker Roth (West Germany)

Panathinaikos won 3–2 on aggregate.

20 March 1985
20:30

| Liverpool (England) | 4–1 | Austria Wien |
|---|---|---|
| Walsh 17', 55'; Nicol 37'; Obermayer 46' (o.g.) | Report | Prohaska 64' |

Anfield, Liverpool
Attendance: 32,761
Referee: Paolo Bergamo (Italy)

Liverpool won 5–2 on aggregate.

== Semi-finals ==
| Team 1 | Agg. | Team 2 | 1st leg | 2nd leg |
|---|---|---|---|---|
| Juventus (Italy) | 3–2 | (France) Bordeaux | 3–0 | 0–2 |
| Liverpool (England) | 5–0 | (Greece) Panathinaikos | 4–0 | 1–0 |

=== First leg ===
10 April 1985
20:30

| Juventus (Italy) | 3–0 | (France) Bordeaux |
|---|---|---|
| Boniek 29'; Briaschi 68'; Platini 71' | Report |

Stadio Comunale, Turin
Attendance: 65,237
Referee: Bruno Galler (Switzerland)

10 April 1985
20:30

| Liverpool (England) | 4–0 | (Greece) Panathinaikos |
|---|---|---|
| Wark 35'; Rush 48', 49'; Beglin 85' | Report |

Anfield, Liverpool
Attendance: 39,488
Referee: Jan Keizer (Netherlands)

=== Second leg ===
24 April 1985
20:00

| Bordeaux (France) | 2–0 | (Italy) Juventus |
|---|---|---|
| Müller 25'; Battiston 80' | Report |

Stade du Parc Lescure, Bordeaux
Attendance: 42,221
Referee: Augusto Lamo Castillo (Spain)

Juventus won 3–2 on aggregate.

24 April 1985
20:00

| Panathinaikos (Greece) | 0–1 | (England) Liverpool |
|---|---|---|
| | Report | Lawrenson 60' |

Olympiako Stadio O.A.K.A., Athens
Attendance: 55,539
Referee: Adolf Prokop (East Germany)

Liverpool won 5–0 on aggregate.

== Final ==
29 May 1985
21:40

| Liverpool (England) | 0–1 | (Italy) Juventus |
|---|---|---|
| | Report | Platini 58' (pen.) |

Stade du Heysel, Brussels
Attendance: 58,000
Referee: André Daina (Switzerland)

== Top scorers ==
| Rank | Name | Team | Goals |
|---|---|---|---|
| 1 | (Sweden) Torbjörn Nilsson | (Sweden) IFK Göteborg | 7 |
| 1 | (France) Michel Platini | (Italy) Juventus | 7 |
| 3 | (Italy) Paolo Rossi | (Italy) Juventus | 5 |
| 3 | (Wales) Ian Rush | (England) Liverpool | 5 |
| 3 | (Scotland) John Wark | (England) Liverpool | 5 |
| 6 | (Italy) Massimo Briaschi | (Italy) Juventus | 3 |
| 6 | (Sweden) Jerry Carlsson | (Sweden) IFK Göteborg | 3 |
| 6 | (Sweden) Stig Fredriksson | (Sweden) IFK Göteborg | 3 |
| 6 | (Socialist Federal Republic of Yugoslavia) Rajko Janjanin | (Socialist Federal Republic of Yugoslavia) Red Star Belgrade | 3 |
| 6 | (France) Bernard Lacombe | (France) Bordeaux | 3 |
| 6 | (Soviet Union) Hennadiy Lytovchenko | (Soviet Union) Dnipro Dnipropetrovsk | 3 |
| 6 | (Germany) Dieter Müller | (France) Bordeaux | 3 |
| 6 | (Sweden) Stefan Pettersson | (Sweden) IFK Göteborg | 3 |
| 6 | (Austria) Toni Polster | Austria Vienna | 3 |
| 6 | (Czechoslovakia) Zdeněk Procházka | (Czechoslovakia) Sparta Praha | 3 |
| 6 | (Austria) Herbert Prohaska | Austria Vienna | 3 |
| 6 | (Greece) Dimitris Saravakos | (Greece) Panathinaikos | 3 |
| 6 | (East Germany) Andreas Thom | (East Germany) BFC Dynamo | 3 |
| 6 | (England) Paul Walsh | (England) Liverpool | 3 |
