= 2016 IAAF World Indoor Championships – Masters Men's 800 metres =

Masters Men's 800 metres at the 2016 IAAF World Indoor Championships
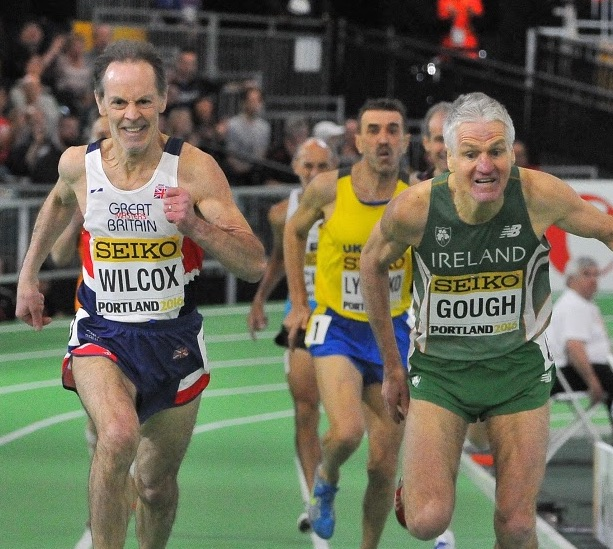
- David Roy Wilcock and Joe Gough (about to fall) at the finish photo courtesy Ken Stone / masterstrack.com
- Venue: Oregon Convention Center
- Dates: March 19 (final)
- Competitors: 6 from 6 nations
- Winning time: 2:15.90

Medalists
gold medal	David Roy Wilcox	Great Britain
silver medal	Joe Gough	Ireland
bronze medal	Oleksandr Lysenko	Ukraine

The masters men's 800 metres was an exhibition event for men in the M60 division at the 2016 IAAF World Indoor Championships held on 19 March 2016.

Joe Gough held the lead and the inside lane going into the last lap, only David Roy Wilcock followed as they separated from the pack. Coming off the final turn, Wilcock went wide into lane 2 and outsprinted Gough. As he saw Wilcock passing him, Gough gave it all he had and dove for the finish line, dramatically falling to the track in second place. Oleksandr Lysenko was able to gain a slight edge on the final lap to get bronze out of a tight finish for third.

== Results ==
Rank	Name	Nationality	Time	Notes
1	David Roy Wilcox	Great Britain	2:15.90	
2	Joe Gough	Ireland	2:16.01	
3	Oleksandr Lysenko	Ukraine	2:17.38	
4	Pierre Faucheur	France	2:18.23	
5	Marcellus Jacobus Scholten	Netherlands	2:18.53	
6	Fiorio Cloki	Uruguay	2:18.66	
