= 1984 Intercontinental Cup =

- Match programme cover
Liverpool	Independiente
(England)	(Argentina)
0	1
- Date: 9 December 1984
- Venue: National Stadium, Tokyo
- Man of the Match: José Percudani (Independiente)
- Referee: Romualdo Arppi Filho (Brazil)
- Attendance: 62,000

The 1984 Intercontinental Cup was an association football match between Liverpool of England and Independiente of Argentina on 9 December 1984 at the National Stadium in Tokyo, Japan, the annual Intercontinental Cup contested between the winners of the European Cup and Copa Libertadores. Liverpool was making their second appearance in the competition, after their loss in 1981. Independiente were appearing in their sixth Intercontinental Cup. They had won the competition once in 1973 and lost the other four.

The teams had qualified for the competition by winning their continent's primary cup competition. Liverpool qualified by winning the primary European cup competition, the European Cup. They won the 1983–84 European Cup by beating Italian team A.S. Roma 4–2 in a penalty shoot-out after the match finished 1–1. Independiente qualified by winning the primary South American cup competition, the Copa Libertadores. They won the 1984 Copa Libertadores by defeating Brazilian team Grêmio 3–1 on points in the finals.

Watched by a crowd of 62,000, Independiente took the lead in the sixth minute when José Percudani scored. Liverpool had the better of the possession during the match, but they were unable to convert their chances and the match finished in a 1–0 victory to Independiente. The win was the Argentine club's second triumph in the competition and the fifth in a row by the South American team.

== Background ==
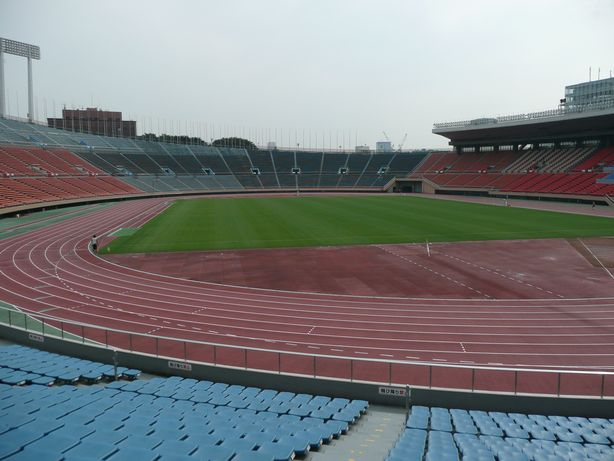
The National Stadium in Tokyo, which hosted the match

Liverpool had qualified for the Intercontinental Cup as a result of winning the 1983–84 European Cup. They beat Roma 4–2 in a penalty shoot-out after the match finished 1–1 to win their fourth European Cup. Liverpool were appearing in their second Intercontinental Cup. Their appearance in 1981 resulted in a 3–0 defeat against Flamengo. Liverpool were scheduled to appear in 1977 and 1978 but did not compete. They declined to play in 1977 and were replaced by runners-up Borussia Mönchengladbach, while in 1978, Liverpool and Boca Juniors declined to play each other.

Independiente qualified for the Intercontinental Cup as the reigning Copa Libertadores winners. They won the 1984 Copa Libertadores by beating Grêmio 3–1 on points over two legs in the finals. It would be Independiente's sixth appearance in the competition. Their previous five appearances had resulted in one win in 1973 and four defeats in 1964, 1965, 1972 and 1974.

Liverpool's last match before the Intercontinental Cup was against Coventry City in the 1984–85 Football League First Division. They won 3–1 courtesy of two goals from John Wark and one from Ian Rush. The last match Independiente played before the Intercontinental Cup was against Rosario Central in the 1984 Argentine Primera División, which they lost 1–0.

== Match ==
=== Summary ===
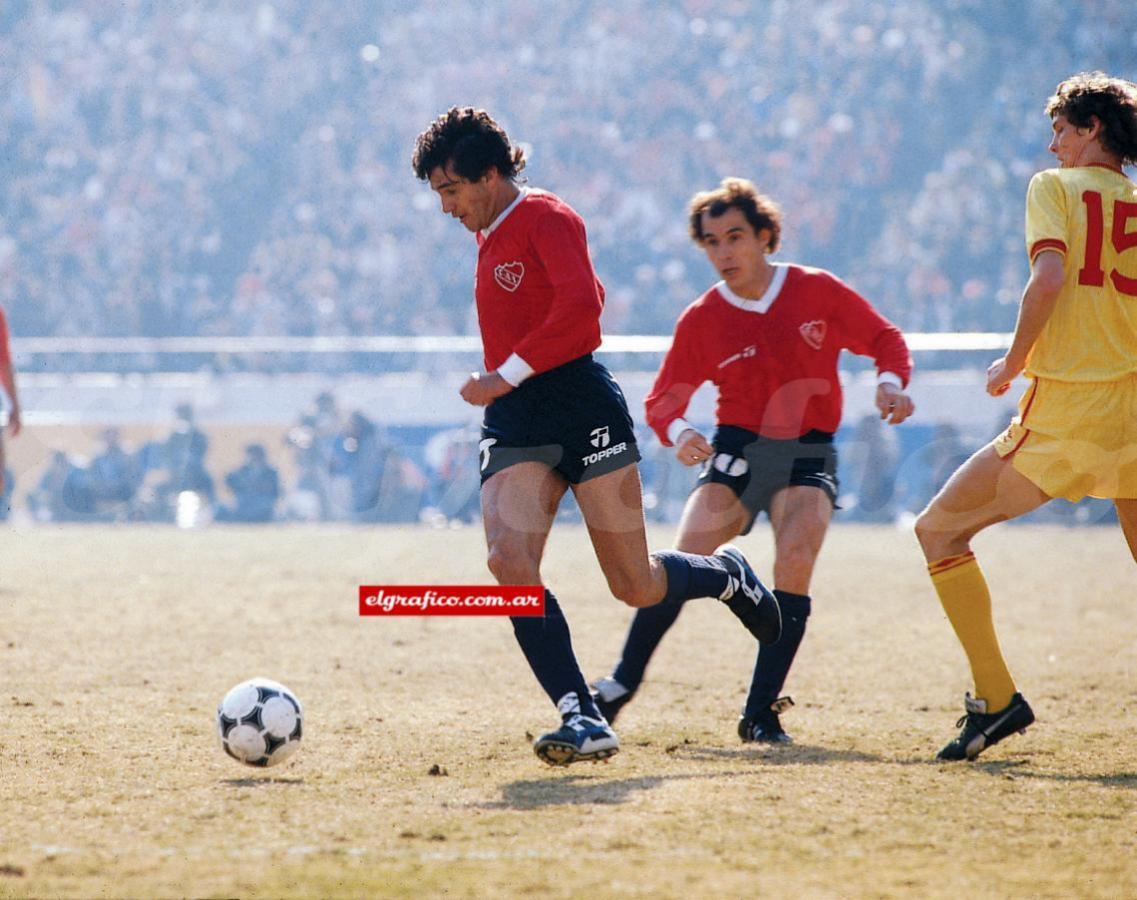
Jorge Burruchaga (left) carrying the ball while being followed by Gary Gillespie of Liverpool. Ricardo Bochini in the middle

Before the match, Liverpool lost defender Mark Lawrenson who had injured his hamstring in training. Gary Gillespie was his replacement. Liverpool kicked off the match and the first few exchanges saw a number of rash tackles. Independiente defender Carlos Enrique tackled Craig Johnston robustly, but the referee indicated to play on. Moments later Liverpool midfielder Jan Mølby tackled Enrique late, which prompted the referee to award a free kick. Liverpool controlled the opening exchanges of the match, but could not work the ball into the Independiente penalty area. However, it was Independiente who opened the scoring, Claudio Marangoni sent a ball over the Liverpool defence for striker José Percudani, whose low shot beat the advancing Liverpool goalkeeper Bruce Grobbelaar to give Independiente a 1–0 lead.

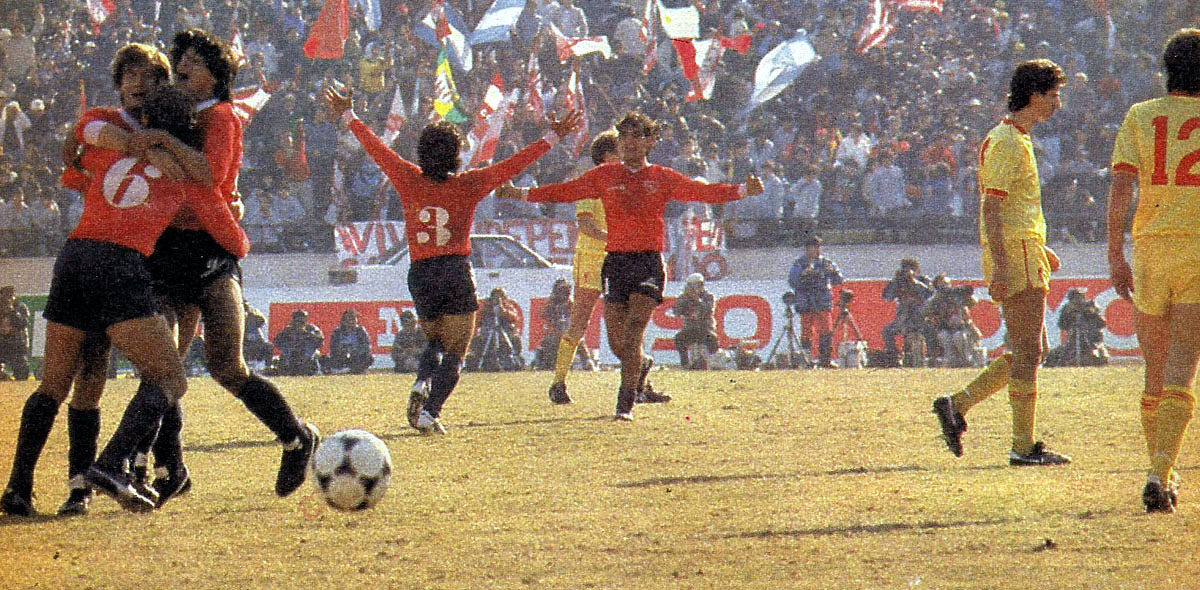
Independiente (wearing red) celebrate their victory

Following the goal, Independiente under instruction from their manager José Omar Pastoriza, began to sit back in their own half inviting Liverpool to attack them. Their plan worked as Liverpool were unable to break down their defence, while their strikers Percudani and Alejandro Barberón counter-attacked when Independiente received the ball. The second half saw Liverpool continue to attack the Independiente goal, but to no avail. Midfielders John Wark and Mølby tried to find a way through the Independiente defence was equal to their efforts. Wark's efforts trying to engineer an equalising goal resulted in him being substituted for Ronnie Whelan in the 76th minute, due to fatigue.

Despite being the better team for the majority of the match, Liverpool were unable to beat the Independiente defence, with their shooting in front of goal being the culprit. Both sides questioned some of the referee's decisions. Liverpool believed they should have had two penalties, while Independiente felt that the assistant referee's decisions were questionable. Incidentally, the referee had served half of his two match ban handed out by the Brazilian Football Association.

=== Details ===
9 December 1984
12:00 JST

Liverpool (England)	0–1	(Argentina) Independiente
	Report	Percudani 6'

National Stadium, Tokyo
Attendance: 62,000
Referee: Romualdo Arppi Filho (Brazil)

Liverpool	Independiente

GK	1	(Zimbabwe) Bruce Grobbelaar
RB	2	(England) Phil Neal (c)
CB	6	(Scotland) Alan Hansen
CB	15	(Scotland) Gary Gillespie
LB	3	(England) Alan Kennedy
RM	10	(Australia) Craig Johnston
CM	11	(Scotland) John Wark		(substituted off) 76'
CM	8	(Denmark) Jan Mølby	(yellow card) 42'
LM	5	(Scotland) Steve Nicol
CF	7	(Scotland) Kenny Dalglish
CF	9	(Wales) Ian Rush
Substitutes:
GK	13	(England) Bob Bolder
MF	12	(Republic of Ireland) Ronnie Whelan		(substituted on) 76'
MF	14	(Scotland) Kevin MacDonald
FW	16	(Republic of Ireland) Michael Robinson
Manager:
(England) Joe Fagan

GK	1	(Uruguay) Carlos Goyén
RB	4	(Argentina) Néstor Clausen	(yellow card) 72'
CB	2	(Argentina) Hugo Villaverde		(substituted off) 74'
CB	6	(Argentina) Enzo Trossero (c)
LB	3	(Argentina) Carlos Enrique
RM	8	(Argentina) Ricardo Giusti
CM	5	(Argentina) Claudio Marangoni
LM	7	(Argentina) Jorge Burruchaga
AM	10	(Argentina) Ricardo Bochini
CF	9	(Argentina) José Percudani
CF	11	(Argentina) Alejandro Barberón
Substitutes:
GK	12	(Argentina) Gustavo Moriconi
DF		(Argentina) Rodolfo Zimmermann
DF	13	(Argentina) Pedro Monzón		(substituted on) 74'
MF		(Argentina) Gerardo Reinoso
MF		(Argentina) Sergio Merlini
FW		(Argentina) Sergio Bufarini
Manager:
(Argentina) José Omar Pastoriza

Man of the Match:
(Argentina) José Percudani (Independiente)

== Post-match ==
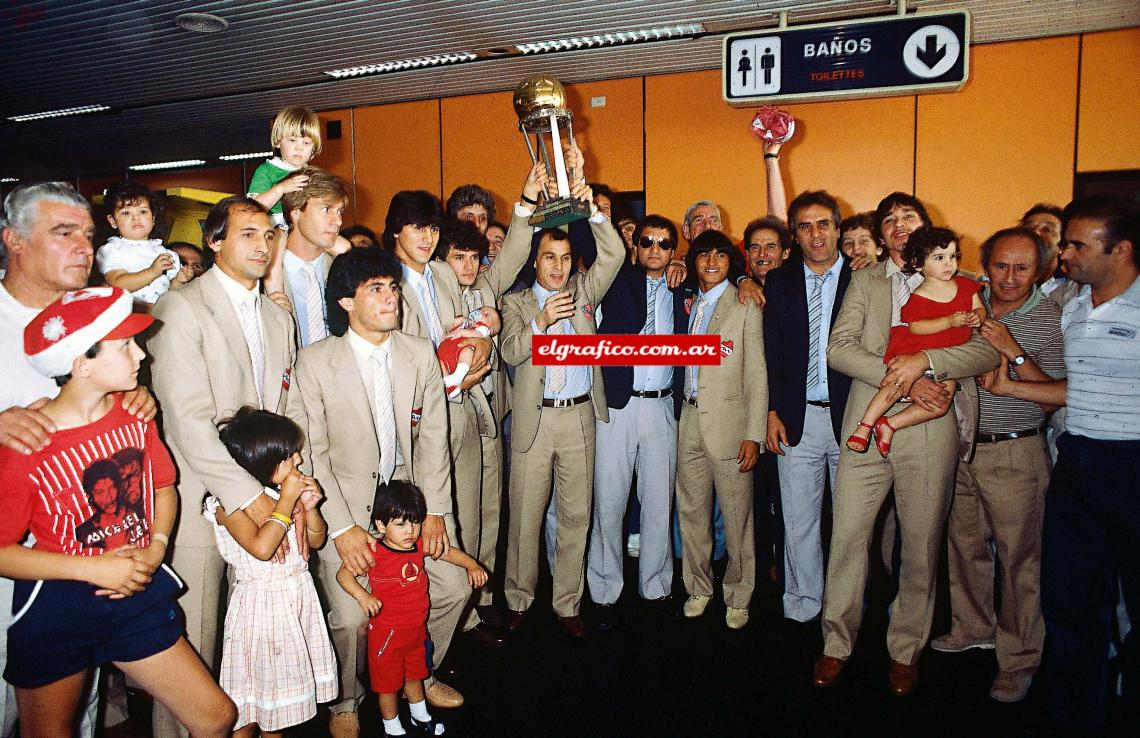
Players and personnel of Independiente with the cup at their arrival in Argentina

Despite the defeat, Liverpool manager Joe Fagan could not fault the effort his players had put in: "Independiente are a good defensive tactical team and we could find no way through, the weather was ideal, we were just as fit as they were. The South Americans have better ball control than we do. We were disappointed with the result but I wasn't disappointed with the display."

Liverpool finished the 1984–85 Football League First Division in second place 13 points behind local rivals Everton. They also reached the final of the 1984–85 European Cup, which they lost 1–0 to Juventus. However the events of the match were overshadowed for the disaster that occurred before kick-off. Liverpool fans breached a fence separating the two groups of supporters and charged the Juventus fans. The resulting weight of people caused a retaining wall to collapse, killing 39 people and injuring hundreds. English clubs were banned indefinitely from European competition, with a condition that when the ban was lifted, Liverpool would serve an extra three-year ban. The ban eventually lasted for five years, clubs returning to European competition in the 1990–91 season.

Independiente would finish their season in the Primera Division in 14th place. Despite this, they competed in the 1985 Copa Libertadores as the reigning champions. However, they were unable to retain their title as they exited in the semi-finals.

== See also ==
- 1983–84 European Cup
- 1984 Copa Libertadores
- Liverpool F.C. in European football

== Bibliography ==
- Hale, Steve; Ponting, Ivan (1992). Liverpool In Europe. London: Guinness Publishing. ISBN 0-85112-569-7.
- Hutchings, Steve; Nawrat, Chris (1995). The Sunday Times Illustrated History of Football: The Post-War Years. London: Chancellor Press. ISBN 1-85153-014-2.
