= Carlos Enrique =

Argentine footballer (born 1963)

Personal information
- Full name: Carlos Alberto Enrique
- Date of birth: 12 December 1963 (age 62)
- Place of birth: Adrogué, Argentina
- Position: Left back

Senior career*
Years	Team	Apps	(Gls)
1982–1988	Independiente	160	(2)
1988–1992	River Plate	102	(1)
1992–1993	Lanús	30	(0)
1993–1994	Gimnasia y Tiro	21	(0)
1994–1995	Alianza Lima	-	
1996–1998	Banfield	-	
1999	All Boys	-	

International career
1991	Argentina	9	(0)
- * Club domestic league appearances and goals as of June 2008

Carlos Alberto Enrique (born 12 December 1963) is a former Argentine football defender who won the Copa América 1991 with Argentina. At club level he won the Copa Libertadores and Copa Intercontinental with Club Atlético Independiente in 1984.

Enrique started his playing career with Independiente in 1982, his first major success was being part of the team that won the Metropolitano in 1983.

In 1984 Enrique started at left back for the Independiente squad that won the Copa Libertadores and then the Copa Intercontinental against Liverpool F.C.

Enrique joined River Plate in 1988 and helped the team to claim the 1989-90 league title.

In 1991 Enrique was called up to join the Argentina squad for the Copa América 1991, which they went on to win, later that year he secured another league title with River Plate.

Enrique played alongside his brother Héctor at River (1988–1990) and at Club Atlético Lanús (1992–1993). His nephews, Fernando, Ramiro (both football) and Facundo (rugby), also became sportsmen.

Enrique also played for Gimnasia y Tiro, Banfield and All Boys in Argentina and Alianza Lima in Peru.

Enrique works as a football coach and has held assistant manager positions in teams such as Nueva Chicago, Almagro and Chacarita Juniors in Argentina and Aurora in Bolivia. In 2011-12 he was assisting Diego Maradona as manager of Al Wasl SC of Dubai.

== Honours ==
=== Club ===
Independiente

- Primera División: 1983 Metropolitano
- Copa Libertadores (1): 1984
- Intercontinental Cup (1): 1984

River Plate

- Primera División: 1989-90, Apertura 1991

=== International ===
Argentina Youth

- South American Games: 1982

Argentina

- Copa América: 1991
