= Norbert Trieloff =

German footballer

- Norbert Trieloff with the East German Olympic team at the Friedrich-Ludwig-Jahn-Sportpark in 1980.

Personal information
- Full name: Norbert Trieloff
- Date of birth: 24 August 1957 (age 69)
- Place of birth: Rostock, East Germany
- Height: 1.79 m (5 ft 10 1/2 in)
- Position: Defender

Youth career
- 1967-1972: SG Dynamo Rostock-Mitte (de)
- 1972-1974: BFC Dynamo

Senior career*
| Years | Team | Apps | (Gls) |
| 1974-1987 | BFC Dynamo | 246 | (13) |
| 1987–1989 | 1. FC Union Berlin | 35 | (1) |

International career
| 1974–1976 | East Germany U18 | 24 | (0) |
| 1976–1980 | East Germany U21 | 23 | (1) |
| 1976-1976 | East Germany B | 1 | (0) |
| 1980–1984 | East Germany Olympic | 16 | (0) |
| 1980–1984 | East Germany | 18 | (0) |
Medal record
Men's Football
Representing East Germany
Olympic Games
| Silver medal – second place | 1980 Moscow | Team |
- * Club domestic league appearances and goals

Norbert Trieloff (born 24 August 1957 in Rostock) is a German former football player.

Trieloff began playing football for the youth teams of SG Dynamo Rostock-Mitte in 1967. He first played as a goalkeeper, before he switched to defence. Trieloff proved to be a talented player. He was transferred to the youth academy of football club BFC Dynamo at the age of 14 and enrolled in the elite Children and Youth Sports School (KJS) "Werner Seelenbinder" in Alt-Hohenschönhausen.

Trieloff made his debut for the first team of BFC Dynamo at barely 17-years-old against BSG Wismut Aue in the 11th matchday of the 1974-75 DDR-Oberliga on 29 November 1974. He was a regular player for BFC Dynamo from the 1977-78 season. Trieloff scored the winning goal for BFC Dynamo in the match against SG Dynamo Dresden in the last matchday of the 1979-80 DDR-Oberliga. BFC Dynamo was one point behind leading SG Dynamo Dresden before the match. The match was played in front of 30,000 spectators at the Friedrich-Ludwig-Jahn-Sportpark on 10 May 1980. The score was 0-0 in the second half. Trieloff then made it 1-0 to BFC Dyamo on a pass from Hartmut Pelka in 77th minute. BFC Dynamo eventually won the match 1-0 and thus captured the league title. Trieloff became East German football champion nine times in a row with BFC Dynamo, under coach Jürgen Bogs.

Trieloff played in 4 matches in the UEFA Cup and 31 matches in the European Cup for BFC Dynamo. He scored the decisive goal for BFC Dynamo, after two saves by the goalkeeper of BFC Dynamo Bodo Rudwaleit, in the penalty shootout between BFC Dynamo and Aberdeen F.C. in front of 26,000 spectators at the Friedrich-Ludwig-Jahn-Sportpark in the first round of the 1984-85 European Cup on 3 October 1984.

Trieloff was transferred to 1. FC Union Berlin in November 1987. He played his first match for 1. FC Union Berlin in the 11th matchday of the 1987-88 DDR-Oberliga against SG Dynamo Dresden at the Stadion an der Alten Försterei on 21 November 1987. Trieloff played 35 matches for 1. FC Union Berlin in the DDR-Oberliga until the end of the 1988-89 season.

Trieloff represented East Germany 18 times between 1980 and 1984. He won the silver medal at the 1980 Moscow Olympics with the East German Olympic team. Trieloff was awarded the Patriotic Order of Merit in bronze the same year, together with his teammates.

Trieloff completed three and a half years of training as a physiotherapist after German reunification and started his own business in Hamm in North Rhine-Westphalia in 1996.

Fans of BFC Dynamo once named a fan club after Norbert Trieloff. He is an institution among football fans and still receives requests for autographs.
