= José Percudani =

Argentine footballer

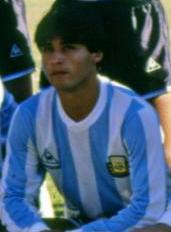
- Percudani with Argentina in 1987

Personal information
- Full name: José Alberto Percudani
- Date of birth: 22 March 1965 (age 61)
- Place of birth: Bragado, Argentina
- Height: 1.71 m (5 ft 7 in)
- Position: Striker

Youth career
- Independiente

Senior career*
Years	Team	Apps	(Gls)
1980–1988	Independiente	137	(46)
1988–1989	Austria Wien	51	(35)
1990	Atlético Madrileño	6	(0)
1990–1991	Universidad Católica	41	(19)
1992	Peñarol	10	(0)
1992–1993	Estudiantes LP	15	(3)
1993–1994	Almirante Brown	50	(19)
1994–1995	Talleres RdE	14	(3)
1995–1996	Bancruz	5	(1)
1998–1999	Martín Güemes	–	(–)
Total		329	(126)

International career
1987	Argentina	5	(0)

Managerial career
- Independiente (youth)
- * Club domestic league appearances and goals

José Alberto Percudani (born 22 March 1965) is an Argentine former footballer who played as a striker.

== Club career ==
Between 1982 and 1988 he played for Independiente, winning both the Libertadores Cup and the Intercontinental Cup in 1984 with the team. In the Intercontinental Cup final he scored the only goal against Liverpool FC, and was also elected as Man of the Match.

In 1988, he was signed by Austria Wien, as a replacement for Toni Polster. In the 1988/89 season he scored 23 goals, with which he came in third on the top goalscorers list in Austria. However, with Austria having four foreign players in their squad and rules then allowing only two to play at the same time, he later lost his place in the team, and in 1990 he moved to Atlético Madrid.

From Atlético he moved to Universidad Católica in Chile, where he scored the winning goal for the team in the 1991 Copa Chile final. He then moved to play for Peñarol in Uruguay, before returning to Argentina, and playing for Estudiantes La Plata, Almirante Brown and Talleres de Remedios de Escalada.

== International career ==
In 1987 he was called to play on the Copa América for the Argentina national team, being part of the attacking section of the team along with Diego Maradona and Claudio Caniggia.

== Honours ==
Independiente

- Primera División: 1983 Metropolitano
- Copa Libertadores (1): 1984
- Intercontinental Cup (1): 1984

Universidad Católica

- Copa Chile (1): 1991

Argentina Youth

- South American Games: 1982

Individual

- Intercontinental Cup Man of the Match (1): 1984
