= Raimo Kuuluvainen =

Finnish footballer (1955–1999)

Personal information
- Date of birth: 23 April 1955
- Place of birth: Hollola, Finland
- Date of death: 29 March 1999 (aged 43)
- Place of death: Tampere, Finland
- Position: Midfielder

International career
Years	Team	Apps	(Gls)
- Finland

Raimo Kuuluvainen (23 April 1955 – 29 March 1999) was a Finnish footballer. He competed in the men's tournament at the 1980 Summer Olympics.
