= Intercontinental Cup (1960–2004) =

International football tournament for clubs

- The trophy given to the winners
- Organiser(s): UEFA; CONMEBOL
- Founded: 1960
- Abolished: 2004
- Region: Europe and South America (1960–1979); Japan (1980–2004)
- Teams: 2
- Related competitions: UEFA Champions League; Copa Libertadores; FIFA Club World Cup; FIFA Intercontinental Cup; Copa Rio; U-20 Intercontinental Cup
- Last champions: (Portugal) Porto (2nd title)
- Most championships: (Uruguay) Peñarol (Uruguay) Nacional (Italy) Milan (Spain) Real Madrid (Argentina) Boca Juniors (3 titles each)

The Intercontinental Cup, officially the European/South American Cup and known from 1980 as the Toyota Cup (Note: From 1980 to 2004, when played in Japan, the competition was known as the Toyota European/South American Cup (Japanese: トヨタ ヨーロッパ/サウスアメリカ カップ) due to sponsorship from Toyota. This was often shortened to Toyota Cup (Japanese: トヨタカップ).) for sponsorship reasons, was an international club football competition endorsed by UEFA (Europe) and CONMEBOL (South America), contested between representative clubs from these confederations, usually the winners of the UEFA Champions League and the South American Copa Libertadores. It ran from 1960 to 2004, when it was succeeded by the FIFA Club World Cup, although they both ran concurrently in 2000.

From its formation in 1960 to 1979, the competition was as a two-legged tie, with a play-off if necessary until 1968, and penalty kicks later. During the 1970s, European participation in the Intercontinental Cup became a running question due to controversial events in the 1969 match, and some European Cup-winning teams withdrew. From 1980, the competition was rebranded and contested as a single match played in Japan, regarded neutral territory for both contestants, and sponsored by multinational automaker Toyota, which offered a secondary trophy, the Toyota Cup. At that point, the Japan Football Association was involved at a logistical level as host, though it continued to be endorsed by UEFA and CONMEBOL.

The first winner of the cup was Spanish side Real Madrid, who beat Peñarol of Uruguay in 1960. The last winner was Portuguese side Porto, defeating Colombian side Once Caldas in a penalty shoot-out in 2004. The competition ended in 2004. Since 2017, past Intercontinental Cup winners have been recognised by FIFA as club world champions.

== History ==
=== Beginnings ===
According to Brazilian newspaper Tribuna de Imprensa in 1958, the idea for the Intercontinental Cup rose in 1958 in a conversation between the then president of the Brazilian FA João Havelange and French journalist Jacques Goddet. The first mention of the creation of the Intercontinental Cup and the Copa Libertadores was published by Brazilian and Spanish newspapers on 9 October 1958, referring to Havelange's announcement of the project to create such competitions, which he uttered during a UEFA meeting he attended as an invitee. Prior to this announcement, the reigning European champions, Real Madrid, played just one intercontinental club competition, the 1957 Tournoi de Paris (they also played the 1956 Pequeña Copa, but scheduled their participation in it before becoming European champions). According to a video record of the highlights of the final match of the 1957 Tournoi de Paris, a video published by Journal Les Actualités Françaises on 19 June 1957, that match, held between Real Madrid and Vasco da Gama, was the first match ever dubbed as "the best team of Europe vs. the best team of South America", as Madrid was the European champions and Vasco was announced to the European audience as the "Brazilian" champions (they were in reality Rio de Janeiro State champions) and thus the reportedly "best team of South America" (as a coincidence, Vasco was also the only club to have theretofore been South American club champions, in 1948), having this match been held at Parc des Princes, then managed by Jacques Goddet; moreover, the 1957 Paris match was the only defeat of Real Madrid to a non-European side since becoming European champions in 1956 and prior to the Intercontinental Cup in 1960, having Madrid's then-president Santiago Bernabéu been one of the instigators of the Intercontinental Cup (see below); for these reasons, some sources have claimed that the 1957 match and the 1958 FIFA World Cup Brazilian victory have influenced the Europeans on the importance of South American football, and thus the idea in 1958 for the creation of the Intercontinental Cup (the Madrid team declined to participate in the 1958 Paris Tournoi for it was held just 5 days before the final of the 1957/1958 European Cup). The Madrid-Vasco 1957 match was described as "being like a club world cup match" by the Brazilian press, as was a June 1959 friendly between Real Madrid and Torneio Rio – São Paulo champions Santos, which Real Madrid won 5–3.

Created in 1960 at the initiative of the European confederation (UEFA), with CONMEBOL's support, the European/South American Cup, known also as the Intercontinental Cup, was contested by the holders of the European Champion Clubs' Cup and the winners of its newly established South American equivalent, the Copa Libertadores. The competition was not endorsed by FIFA, and in 1961 FIFA refused to allow it to take place unless the participants gave it a "private friendly match" status. However, the competition went on regardless, with the endorsement of UEFA and CONMEBOL, both of whom include every edition of the competition in their records. It was the brainchild of UEFA president Henri Delaunay, who also helped Jules Rimet in the realisation of the inaugural FIFA World Cup in 1930. Initially played over two legs, with a third match if required in the early years (when goal difference did not count), the competition had a rather turbulent existence. The first winners of the competition were Spanish club Real Madrid. Real Madrid managed to hold Uruguayan side Peñarol 0–0 in Montevideo and trounce the South Americans 5–1 in Madrid to win.

After Real Madrid's victory in the first Intercontinental Cup, Barcelona newspaper Mundo Deportivo hailed the Madrid team as the first world champion club; although they pointed out that the competition "did not include Africans, Asians and other countries part to FIFA", they also expressed doubt that these regions presented football of the same quality as Europe and South America. The Spaniards titled themselves world champions until FIFA stepped in and objected; citing that the competition did not grant the right to attempt participation to any other champions from outside Europe and South America, FIFA stated that they can only claim to be intercontinental champions of a competition played between two continental organisations (in contrast to the Intercontinental Cup, the right to attempt participation at the FIFA World Cup, through FIFA invitation in 1930 and qualification process since 1934, was open to every FIFA member-country, regardless of the continent where it was located). Peñarol would appear again the following year and come out victorious after beating Portuguese club Benfica on the play-off; after a 1–0 win by the Europeans in Lisbon and a 5–0 trashing by the South Americans, a play-off at the Estadio Centenario saw the home side squeeze a 2–1 win to become the first South American side to win the competition.

In 1962 the tournament grew more in worldwide attention after it was swept through the sublime football of a Santos team led by Pelé, considered by some the best club team of all times. Os Santásticos, also known as O Balé Branco ("The White Ballet"), which dazzled the world during that time and containing stars such as Gilmar, Mauro, Mengálvio, Coutinho, and Pepe, won the title after defeating Benfica 3–2 in Rio de Janeiro and thrashing the Europeans 2–5 in their Estádio da Luz. Santos would successfully defend the title in 1963 after being pushed all the way by Milan. After each side won 4–2 at their respective home legs, a play-off match at the Maracanã saw Santos keep the title after a tight 1–0 victory. The competition attracted the interest of other continents. The North and Central American confederation, CONCACAF, was created, among other reasons, to attempt the participation of North and Central American clubs in the Copa Libertadores, and thus in the Intercontinental Cup. Milan's fierce rivals, Inter Milan, would go on to win the 1964 and 1965 Intercontinental Cups, beating Argentine club Independiente on both occasions, in 1964 after a play-off match won at Santiago Bernabéu in extra time with a goal from Mario Corso, becoming the first European team to win two times in a row the competition. Peñarol gained revenge for their loss in 1960 by crushing Real Madrid 4–0 in aggregate in 1966.

=== Rioplatense violence ===
However, as a result of the violence often practised in the Copa Libertadores by Argentine and Uruguayan clubs during the 1960s, disagreements with CONMEBOL, the lack of financial incentives and the violent, brutal and controversial way the Brazilian national team was treated in the 1966 FIFA World Cup by European teams, Brazilian football—including its club sides—declined to participate in international competitions in the late 1960s, including the Copa Libertadores and consequently the Intercontinental Cup. During this time, the competition became dogged by foul play. Calendar problems, acts of brutality, even on the pitch, and boycotts tarnished its image, to the point of bringing into question the wisdom of organising it at all.

The 1967 edition between Argentina's Racing Club and Scotland's Celtic were violent affairs, with the third decisive game being dubbed "The Battle of Montevideo" after three players from the Scottish side and two from the Argentine side were sent off. A fourth Celtic player was also dismissed near the end of the game, but amid the chaos he got away with staying on (the use of yellow and red cards would not be adopted until the 1970 FIFA World Cup).

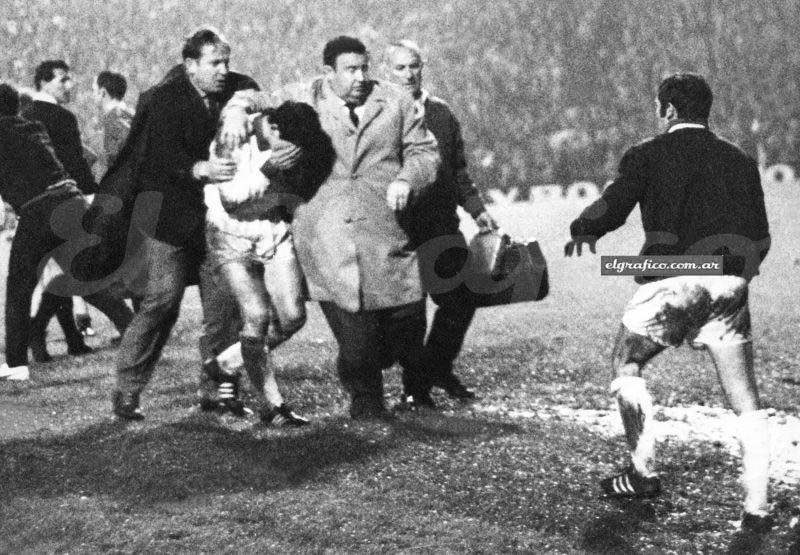
Some of the rough moments in the 1968 match, between Manchester United and Estudiantes LP in Old Trafford, José Medina (covering his face), being sent off after a fight with George Best

The following season, Argentine side Estudiantes de La Plata faced England's Manchester United in which the return leg saw Estudiantes come out on top of a bad-tempered series. But it was the events of 1969 which damaged the competition's integrity.

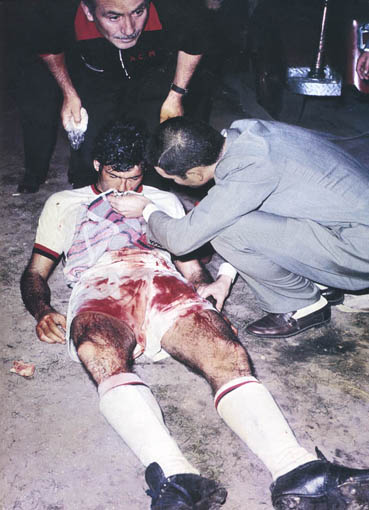
Milan's Néstor Combin was left bloodied and unconscious after a brutal series against Estudiantes de La Plata in 1969

After a 3–0 win at San Siro, Milan went to Buenos Aires to play Estudiantes at La Bombonera. Estudiantes' players booted balls at the Milan team as they warmed up and hot coffee was poured on the Italians as they emerged from the tunnel by Estudiantes' fans. Estudiantes resorted to inflicting elbows and allegedly even needles at the Milanese team in order to intimidate them. Pierino Prati was knocked unconscious and continued for a further 20 minutes despite suffering from a mild concussion. Estudiantes goalkeeper Alberto Poletti also punched Gianni Rivera, but the most vicious treatment was reserved for Néstor Combin, an Argentinean-born striker, who had faced accusations of being a traitor as he was on the opposite side of the intercontinental match.

Combin was kicked in the face by Poletti and later had his nose and cheekbone broken by the elbow of Ramón Aguirre Suárez. Bloodied and broken, Combin was asked to return to the pitch by the referee but fainted. While unconscious, Combin was arrested by Argentine police on a charge of draft dodging, having not undertaken military service in the country. The player was forced to spend a night in the cells, eventually being released after explaining he had fulfilled national service requirements as a French citizen. Estudiantes won the game 2–1 but Milan took the title on aggregate.

Italian newspaper Gazzetta dello Sport dubbed it "Ninety minutes of a man-hunt". The Argentinean press responded with "The English were right" – a reference to Alf Ramsey's famous description of the Argentina national football team as "animals" during the 1966 FIFA World Cup. The Argentinean Football Association (AFA), under heavy international pressure, took stern action. Argentina's president, military dictator Juan Carlos Onganía, summoned Estudiantes delegate Oscar Ferrari and demanded "the severest appropriate measures in defence of the good name of the national sport. [It was a] lamentable spectacle which breached most norms of sporting ethics". Poletti was banned from the sport for life, Suárez was banned for 30 games, and Eduardo Manera for 20 with the former and latter serving a month in jail.

=== Degradation ===
Due to the brutality in the 1967 match, FIFA was called into providing penalties and regulating the tournament. However, FIFA stated that it could not stipulate regulations in a competition that it did not organise. Though the competition was endorsed by UEFA and CONMEBOL, René Courte, FIFA's General Sub-Secretary, wrote an article shortly afterwards (1967) stating that FIFA viewed the competition as a "European-South American friendly match". Courte's statement was endorsed by then-FIFA president Sir Stanley Rous, who then stated that FIFA saw the Intercontinental Cup as a friendly match. After these controversial statements, Madrid newspaper ABC then pointed out that, though the Intercontinental Cup was not endorsed by FIFA, it was endorsed by UEFA and CONMEBOL, therefore being an "intercontinental jurisdiction" cup. However, with the AFC and CONCACAF club competitions in place, FIFA opened the idea of supervising the Intercontinental Cup if it included those confederations, which was met with a negative response from its participating confederations, UEFA and CONMEBOL. According to Rous, CONCACAF and the Asian Football Confederation had requested in 1967 to participate in the Intercontinental Cup, which was rejected by UEFA and CONMEBOL. In 1970, the FIFA Executive Committee gathering put forward, unsuccessfully, a proposal for the expansion of the Intercontinental Cup into a Club World Cup with representative clubs of every existing continental confederation. Nevertheless, some European champions started to decline participation in the tournament after the events of 1969.

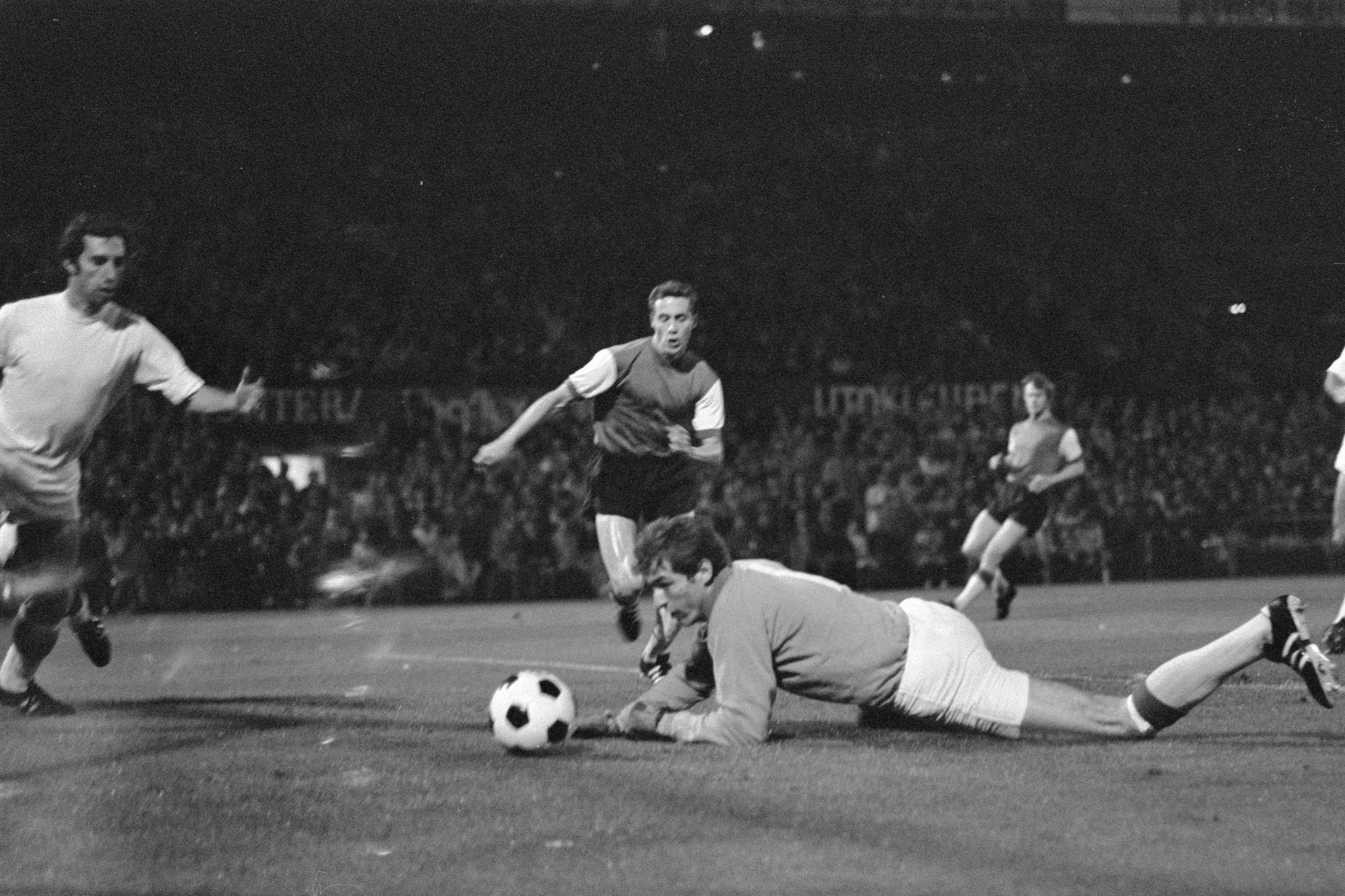
A moment of the Feyenoord v Estudiantes match on September 9, 1970

Estudiantes would face Dutch side Feyenoord the following season, which saw the Dutch side victorious. Oscar Malbernat ripped off Joop van Daele's glasses and trampled on them claiming that he was "not allowed to play with glasses". Dutch side Ajax, European champions of 1971, would decline to face Uruguay's Nacional due to violence in previous matches, which resulted in European Cup runners-up, Greek side Panathinaikos, participating. Ajax fears about Nacional's brutal game were confirmed. In the first game in Piraeus, Uruguayan striker Julio Morales broke the leg of Yiannis Tomaras with a brutal blow. According to the Greek press of the time, the sound of the fracture was heard up to the stands. The Greek defender collapsed on the ground and was transported unconscious out of the field. The medical diagnosis was a fracture of the tibia and fibula, an injury that effectively ended his career. Nacional won the series 3–2 on aggregate.

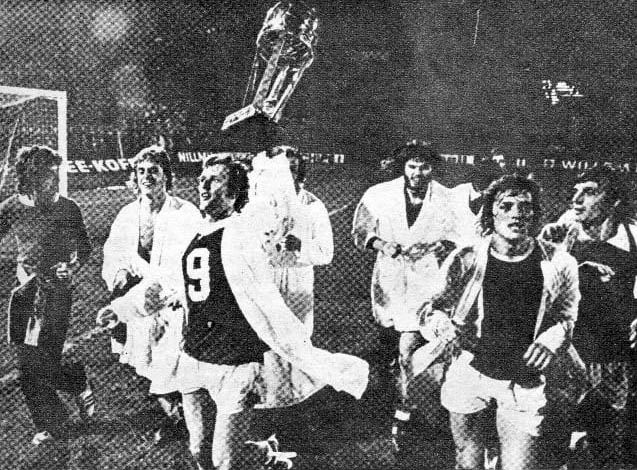
Dutch team Ajax won the 1972 series against Argentine club Independiente

Ajax participated in 1972 against Independiente. The team's arrival at Buenos Aires was extremely hostile: Johan Cruyff received several death threats from Independiente's local fan firms. Due to the indifference from the Argentine police, Ajax manager Ştefan Kovács appointed an organised emergency security detail for the Nederlandse meester, headed by himself and team member Barry Hulshoff, described as a big and burly man. In the first leg, Cruyff opened the scoring in Avellaneda at the 5th minute. As a result, Dante Mircoli retaliated with a vicious tackle a couple of minutes later; Cruyff was too injured to continue and the Dutch team found themselves being assaulted with tackles and punches. Kovács had to convince his team to play on during half-time as his players wanted to withdraw. Ajax squeezed a 1–1 tie and followed up with a 3–0 trounce in Amsterdam to win the Cup. Although Ajax were the defending champions, they again declined to participate in the 1973 Intercontinental Cup after Independiente won the Copa Libertadores again, officially claiming "financial reasons" not to play. Despite initially refusing to participate in the competition, European Cup runners-up Juventus replaced Ajax. A single-match final was played in Rome and the Argentines won.

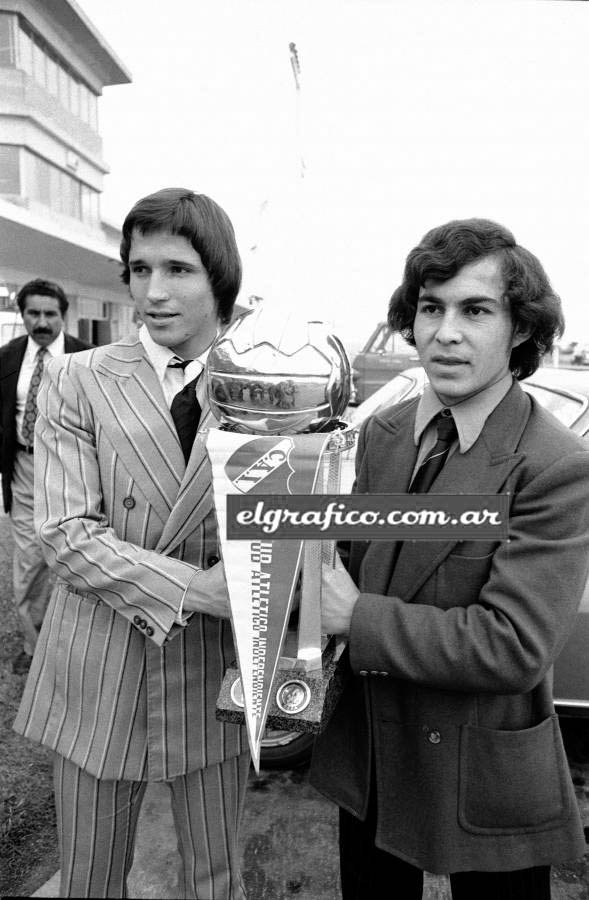
Daniel Bertoni (left) and Ricardo Bochini with the Intercontinental trophy won in 1973 versus Juventus

Also in 1973, French newspaper L'Équipe, which helped to bring about the birth of the European Cup, volunteered to sponsor a Club World Cup contested by the champions of Europe, South America, North and Central America, and Africa, the only continental club tournaments in existence at the time; the competition was to potentially take place in Paris between September and October 1974 with an eventual final to be held at the Parc des Princes. The proposal, supported by CONMEBOL, was dismissed due to the negativity of the Europeans. In 1974, João Havelange was elected president of FIFA, having made the proposal, among others, of creating a multicontinental Club World Cup. In 1975, L'Équipe once again made its 1973 proposal, again to no avail.

West German club Bayern Munich also declined to play in 1974 for scheduling issues while Independiente again qualified to participate. European Cup runners-up Atlético Madrid from Spain won the competition 2–1 on aggregate. Once again, Independiente and Bayern Munich qualified to participate in 1975. Both teams didn't find a compatible schedule and this time the European Cup runners-up declined to participate so the competition was not played. That same year, L'Équipe tried, once again, to create a Club World Cup, in which the participants would have been: the four semifinalists of the European Cup, both finalists of the Copa Libertadores, as well as the African and Asian champions. However, UEFA declined once again and the proposal failed.

In 1976, when Brazilian side Cruzeiro won the Copa Libertadores, the European champions Bayern Munich willingly participated, with the Bavarians winning 2–0 on aggregate. In an interview with Jornal do Brasil, Bayern's manager Dettmar Cramer denied that Bayern's refusal to dispute the 1974 and 1975 Intercontinental Cups were a result of the rivals being Argentine teams. He claimed it was a scheduling impossibility, rather, which kept the West Germans from participating. He also stated that the competition was not economically rewarding due to the team's fan base's disinterest in the Cup. To cover the costs of playing the first leg in Munich's Olympiastadion, the organisers needed to have a minimum of 25,000 spectators. However, due to heavy snow and cold weather, only 18,000 showed up. Because of this deficit, Cramer stated that if Bayern were to win the European Cup again, they would decline to participate as it held no assurances of income, and that a friendly match, as the one Bayern Munich had scheduled in Tel Aviv, would have been more financially rewarding to them.

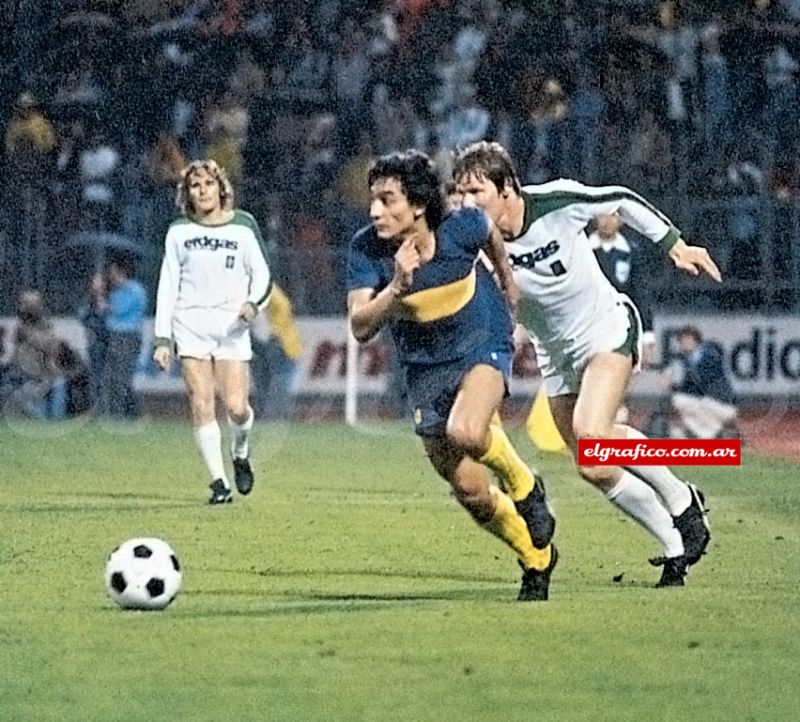
Argentine Boca Juniors played West German Borussia Mönchengladbach after European champions Liverpool declined to participate in the 1977 edition. In the image, José Luis Salinas carrying the ball

Argentine side Boca Juniors qualified for the 1977 edition, for which the European champions, English club Liverpool, refused to participate. Boca Juniors defeated European Cup runners-up, West German club Borussia Mönchengladbach, 5–2 on aggregate. In 1978 Liverpool alleged "scheduling conflicts" that did not allow them to play and Boca Juniors declined to face Belgian club Brugge, which was the 1978 European Cup runners-up, leaving that year's competition undisputed. In 1979 England's Nottingham Forest declined to participate and Paraguay's Olimpia won the trophy after defeating European Cup runners-up Swedish side Malmö FF, winning both legs. However, the competition had greatly declined in prestige. After the 0–1 win of the South Americans in the first leg at Malmö, which saw fewer than 5,000 Swedish fans turn up, Spanish sports newspaper Mundo Deportivo called the Cup "a dog without an owner".

The truth is that the Intercontinental Cup is an adventitious competition without foundation. It has no known owner, it depends on a strange consensus and the interested clubs are not tempted to risk much for so little money, as evidenced by the attendance at the game in Malmö, played, of course, in absence of this year's champion, Nottingham Forest, by the Swedish team, finalist in one of the most boring and worst games played to cap off the European Cup since 1956.

— Spanish newspaper Mundo Deportivo

According to Brazilian newspaper O Estado de São Paulo, the deal for the establishment of the Interamerican Cup was made in 1968 by CONMEBOL and CONCACAF, and established that the Interamerican Cup champion club would be entitled to represent the American continent in the Intercontinental Cup. According to the Mexican newspapers, after winning the 1977 and 1980 Interamerican Cup tournaments, Mexican clubs América and PUMAS Unam, and the Mexican Football Association, demanded, unsuccessfully, to participate in the Intercontinental Cup, either by representing the American continent against the European champions or by creating a UEFA-CONMEBOL-CONCACAF tournament.

=== Rebirth in Japan ===
Logo of the tournament, used between 1980 and 2004

Seeing the deterioration of the Intercontinental Cup, Japanese motor corporation Toyota took the competition under its wing, and created contractual obligations to have the Intercontinental Cup played in Japan once a year, with every club participating being obliged to participate or face legal consequences. This modern format breathed new air into the competition which saw a new trophy handed out along with the Intercontinental Cup, the Toyota Cup.

In order to protect themselves against the possibility of European withdrawals, Toyota, UEFA and every European Cup participant signed annual contracts requiring the eventual winners of the European Cup to participate in the Intercontinental Cup – this was added as a condition to those UEFA stipulated for clubs to participate in the European Cup – or face an international lawsuit from UEFA and Toyota. Barcelona, the winners of the 1991–92 European Cup, considered not participating in the Intercontinental Cup in 1992, and the aforementioned contractual obligation weighed in for their decision to play.

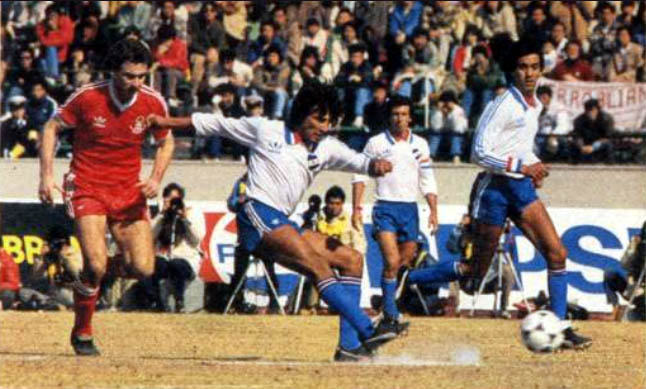
Waldemar Victorino shooting during the 1980 match, Nacional (winner) v Nottingham Forest, which was the first held in Japan

The first Toyota Cup was held in 1980, which saw Uruguay's Nacional triumph over Nottingham Forest. The 1980s saw a domination by South American sides as Brazil's Flamengo and Grêmio, Uruguay's Nacional and Peñarol, Argentina's Independiente and River Plate take the spoils once each after Nacional's victory in 1980. Only Juventus, Porto and Milan managed to bring the trophy back to Europe.

In that decade, the English Football Association attempted to organise a Club World Cup sponsored by promoting company West Nally, only to be shot down by UEFA.

The 1990s proved to be a decade dominated by European teams, as Milan, Red Star Belgrade, Ajax, Juventus, Real Madrid, Manchester United, and newcomers Borussia Dortmund of Germany were fuelled to victory by their economic powers and heavy poaching of South American stars. Only three titles went to South America, as São Paulo and Argentina's Vélez Sársfield came out the winners, each of them defeating Milan, with São Paulo's inaugural win being over Barcelona.

The 2000s would see Boca Juniors win the competition twice for South America, while European victories came from Bayern Munich, Real Madrid, and Porto.

The 2004 Intercontinental Cup proved to be the last one, as the competition was merged with the FIFA Club World Cup.

== International participation ==
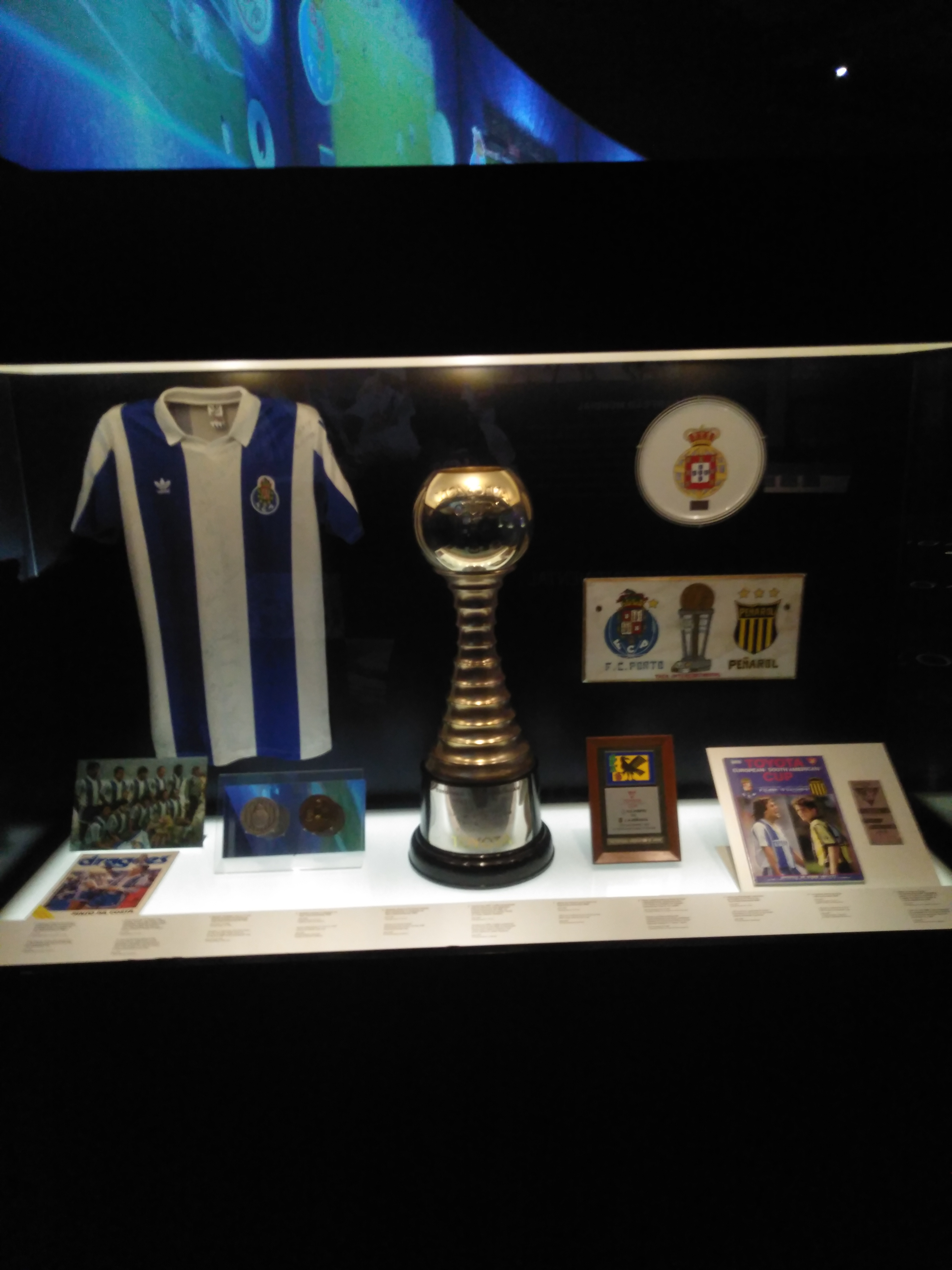
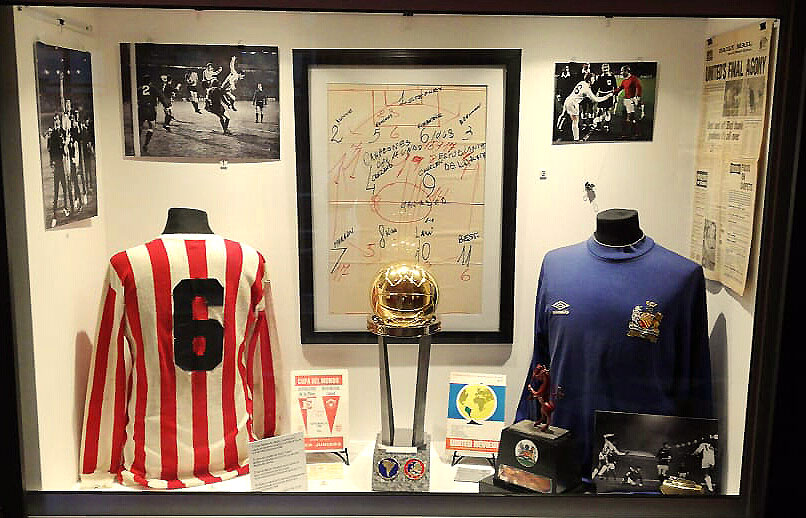
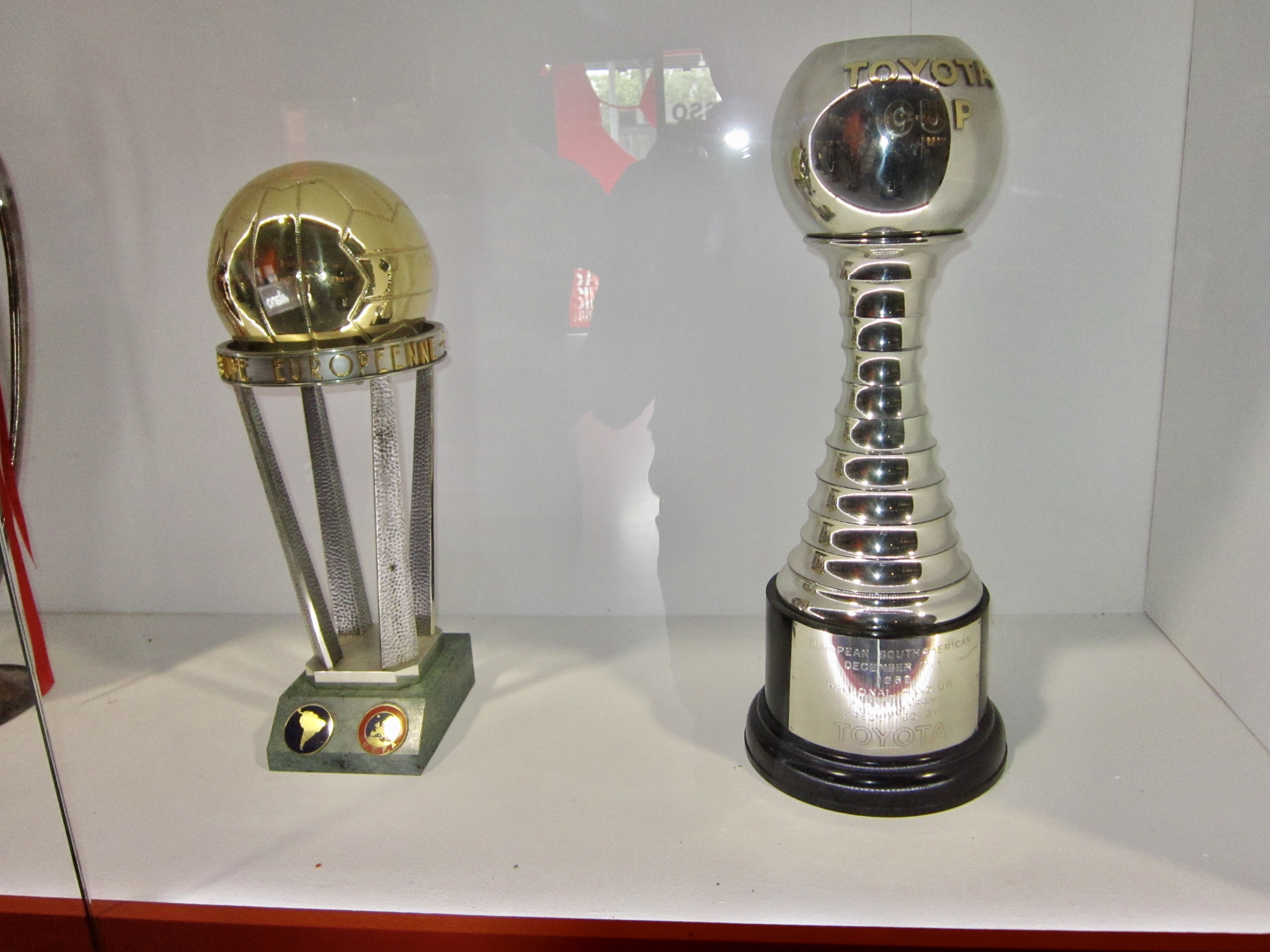
Trophies of Intercontinental and Toyota Cup and shirts worn, displayed at the Porto (left), Estudiantes de La Plata, and San Siro Museums

All the winning teams from Intercontinental Cup were regarded as de facto "world club champions". According to some texts on FIFA.com, due to the superiority at sporting level of the European and South American clubs to the rest of the world, reflected earlier in the tournament for national teams, the winning clubs of the Intercontinental Cup were named world champions and can claim to be symbolic World champions, in a "symbolic" club world championship, while the FIFA Club World Cup would have another dimension, as the "true" world club showdown, created because, with the passage of time and the development of football outside Europe and South America, it had become "unrealistic" to continue to confer the symbolic title of world champion upon the winners of the Intercontinental Cup, the idea to expand it being mentioned for the first time in 1967 by Stanley Rous as CONCACAF and the AFC had established their continental club competitions and requested the participation, an expansion that was to occur only in 2000 through the 2000 FIFA Club World Championship. Nevertheless, some European champions started to decline participation in the tournament after the events of 1969. Though "symbolic" or de facto as a club world championship, the Intercontinental Cup has always been an official title at interconfederation level, with both UEFA and CONMEBOL having always considered all editions of the competition as part of their honours.

== FIFA recognition ==
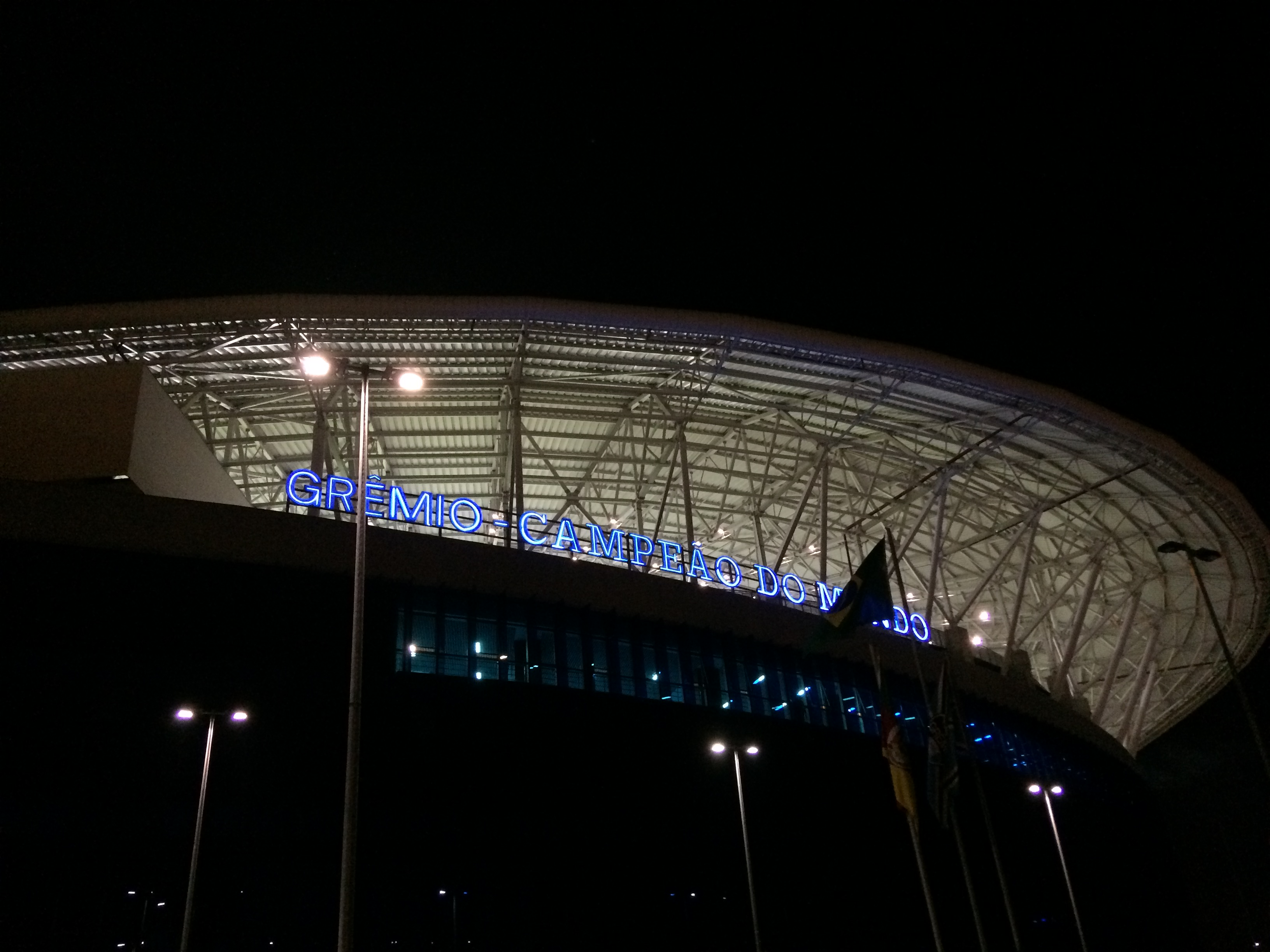
Sign at Arena do Grêmio saying "Grêmio - Campeão do Mundo" (Grêmio - World Champion), celebrating Grêmio's 1983 Intercontinental Cup as a world championship

Throughout the history of football, various attempts have been made to organise a tournament that identifies "the best club team in the world" – such as the Football World Championship, the Lipton Trophy, the Copa Rio, the Pequeña Copa del Mundo and the International Soccer League– due to FIFA's lack of interest or inability to organise club competitions, – the Intercontinental Cup is considered by FIFA as the predecessor to the FIFA Club World Cup, which was held for the first time in 2000.

On 27 October 2017, the FIFA Council, while not promoting statistical unification between the Intercontinental Cup and the Club World Cup, in respect to the history of the two tournaments (which merged in 2005), has made official (de jure) the world title of the Intercontinental Cup, recognising all the winners as club world champions, with the same title of the FIFA Club World Cup winners, or "FIFA Club World Champions".

FIFA recognises the Intercontinental Cup as the sole direct predecessor of the Club World Cup, and the champions of both competitions are the only ones uncontroversially officially recognised by FIFA as Club World Champions, as seen in the FIFA Club World Cup Statistical Kit, the official document of FIFA's club competition.

== Trophy ==
The competition trophy bears the words "Coupe Européenne-Sudamericaine" ("European-South American Cup") at the top. At the base of the trophy, there is the round logo of UEFA and a map of South America in a circle.

During the sponsorship by Toyota, the competition awarded an additional trophy, entitled "Toyota Cup", usually given to the winning team's vice-captain.

== Cup format ==
From 1960 to 1979, the Intercontinental Cup was played in two legs. Between 1960 and 1968, the cup was decided on points only, the same format used by CONMEBOL to determine the winner of the Copa Libertadores final through 1987. Because of this format, a third match was needed when both teams were equal on points. Commonly this match was host by the continent where the last game of the series was played. From 1969 through 1979, the competition adopted the European standard method of aggregate score, with away goals.

Starting in 1980, the final became a single match. Up until 2001, the matches were held at Tokyo's National Stadium. Finals since 2002 were held at the Yokohama International Stadium, also the venue of the 2002 FIFA World Cup final.

== Results ==
=== Players ===
- Alessandro Costacurta and Paolo Maldini played five times in the competition, all with (Italy) Milan (1989, 1990, 1993, 1994, 2003).
- (Argentina) Estudiantes (1968, 1969 and 1970) and (Argentina) Independiente (1972, 1973 and 1974) played in three consecutive years. A few players in those teams participated in all three, including Carlos Bilardo and Juan Ramón Verón.

== All-time top scorers ==
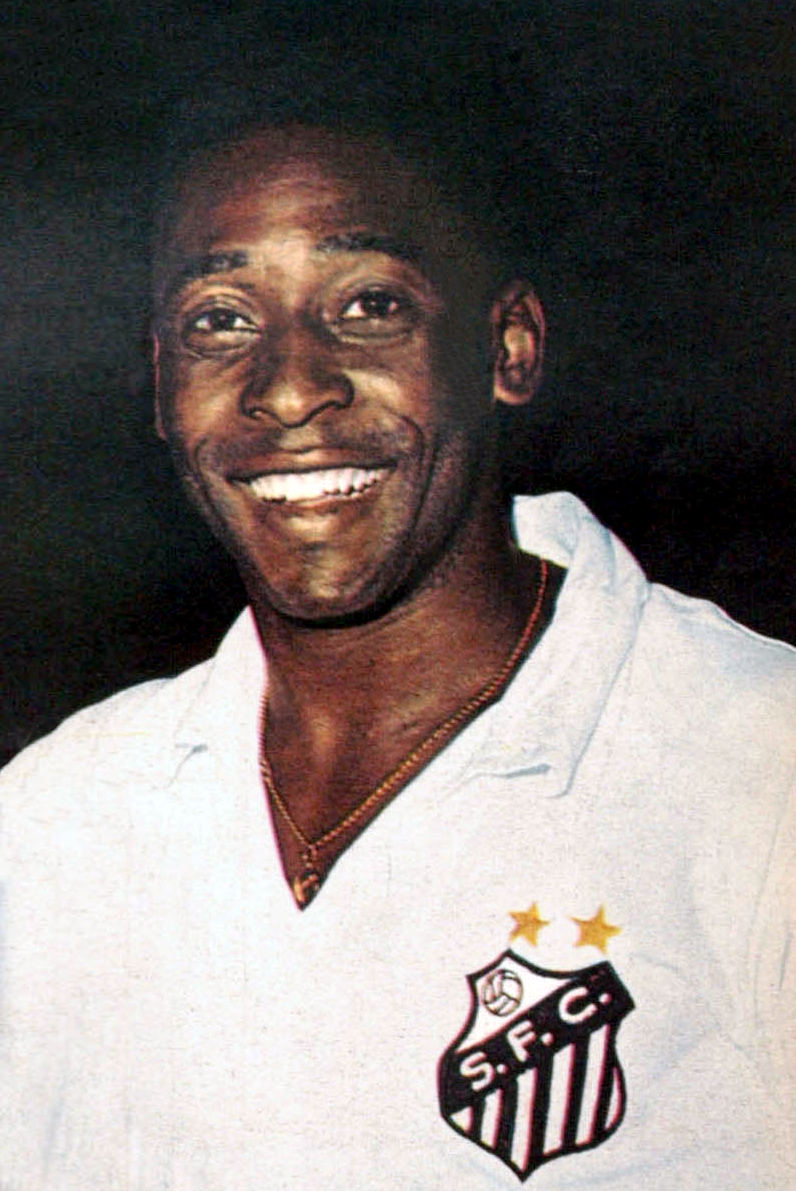
Pelé is the all-time top goalscorer in Intercontinental Cup's history with 7 goals in 3 matches

- Pelé is the all-time top scorer in the competition having scored seven goals in three matches.
  - In 1962, he scored five goals in two matches against (Portugal) Benfica, including a hat-trick in the second leg played in Lisbon (the only hat trick in competition's history).
  - In 1963, he scored two goals in the first leg (vs Milan).
- Only six players scored at least three goals in the Intercontinental Cup.

| Player | Club | Goals | Apps | Years |
|---|---|---|---|---|
| (Brazil) Pelé | (Brazil) Santos | 7 | 3 | 1962, 1963 |
| (Ecuador) Alberto Spencer | (Uruguay) Peñarol | 6 | 6 | 1960, 1961, 1966 |
| (Argentina) Luis Artime | (Uruguay) Nacional | 3 | 2 | 1971 |
| (Uruguay) José Sasía | (Uruguay) Peñarol | 3 | 3 | 1961 |
| (Portugal) Santana | (Portugal) Benfica | 3 | 4 | 1961, 1962 |
| (Italy) Sandro Mazzola | (Italy) Inter Milan | 3 | 4 | 1964, 1965 |

== Hat-tricks ==
Pelé is the only player to have scored a hat-trick in an Intercontinental Cup match (1962 second leg, vs Benfica in Lisbon).

| Player | Nation | Club | Opponent | Goals | Goal times | Score | Tournament | Round | Date |
|---|---|---|---|---|---|---|---|---|---|
| Pelé | Brazil | (Brazil) Santos | (Portugal) Benfica | 3 | 15', 25', 64' | 5–2 | 1962 Intercontinental Cup | Second leg | 11 October 1962 |

== Man of the Match ==
The award was first presented in 1980 as the Toyota Cup Most Valuable Player of the Match Award.

Man of the Match

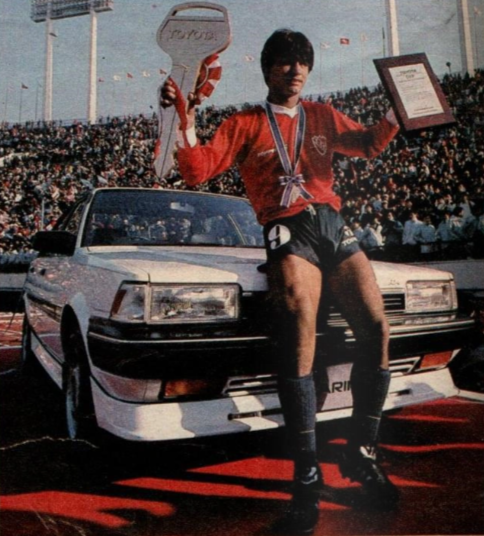
José Percudani (1984)

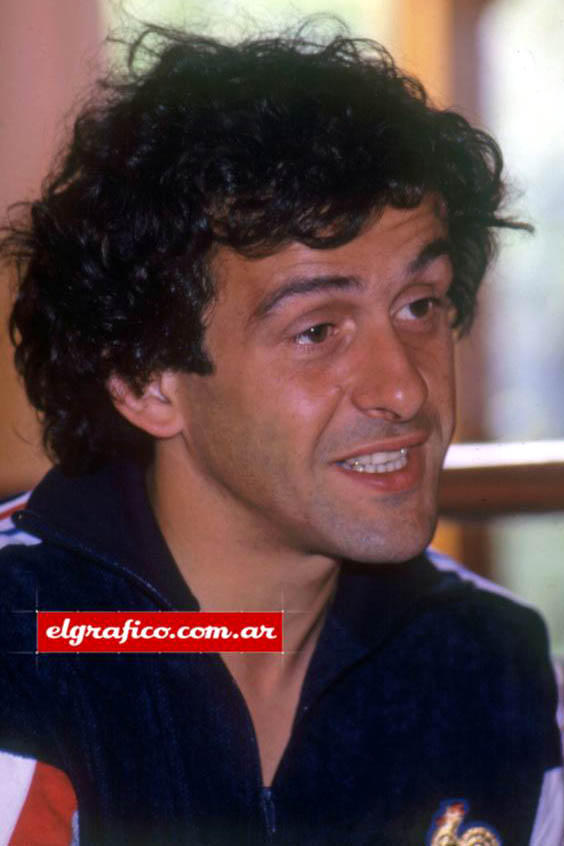
Michel Platini (1985)

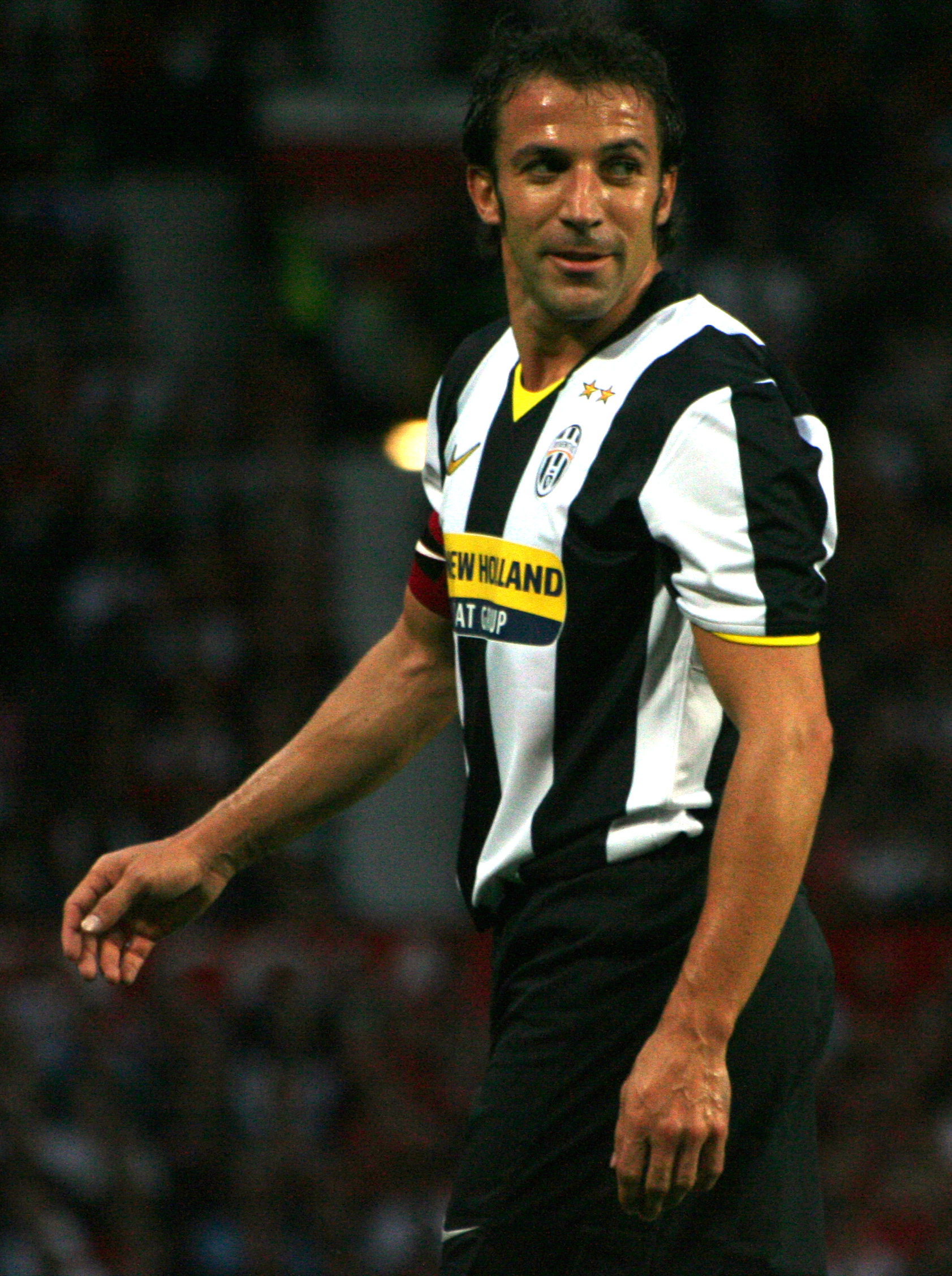
Alessandro Del Piero (1996)

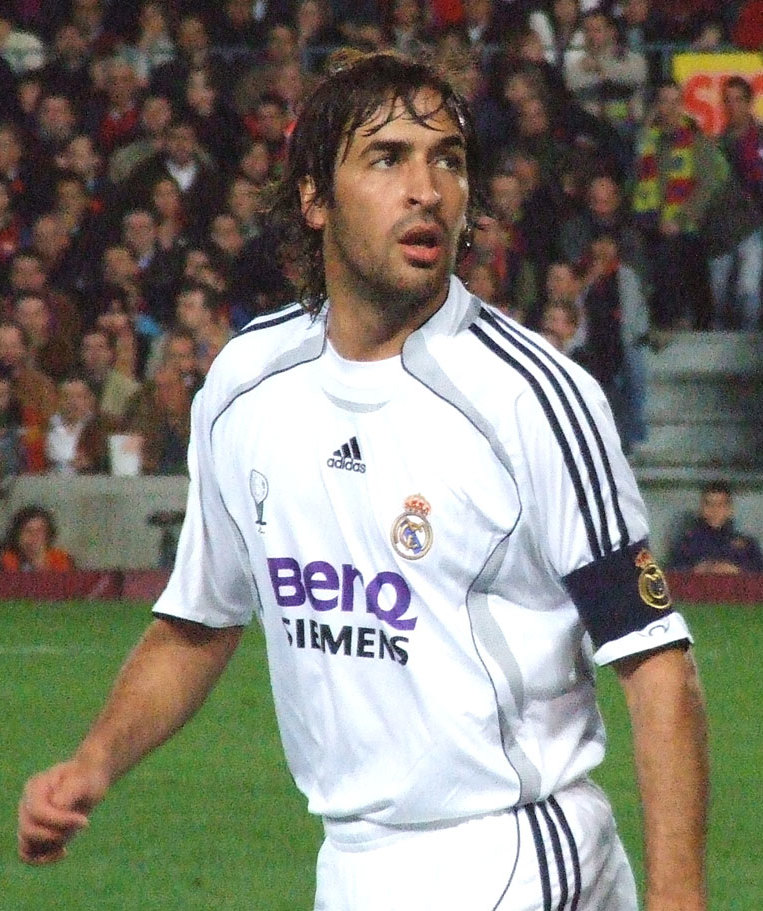
Raúl (1998)

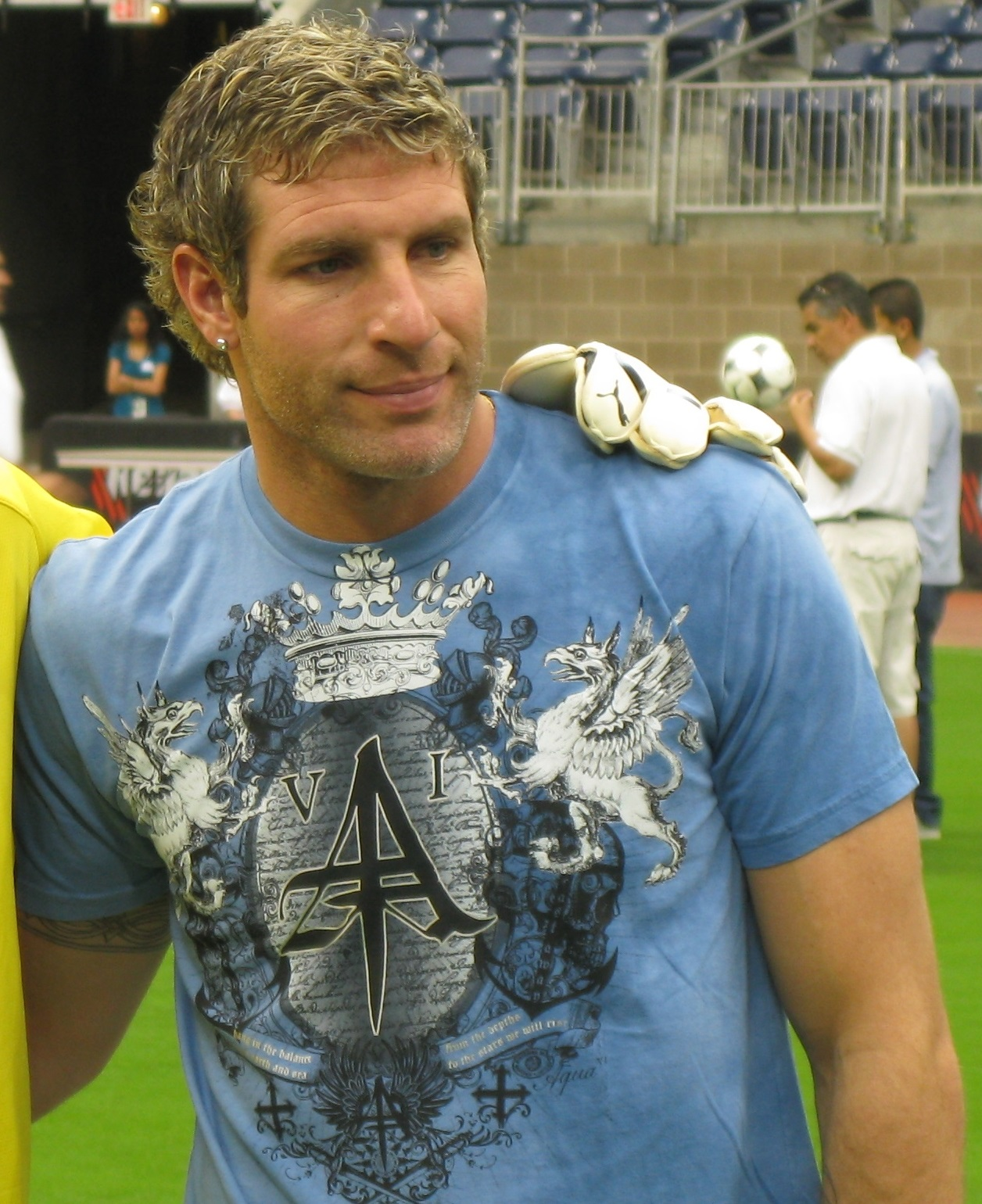
Martín Palermo (2000)

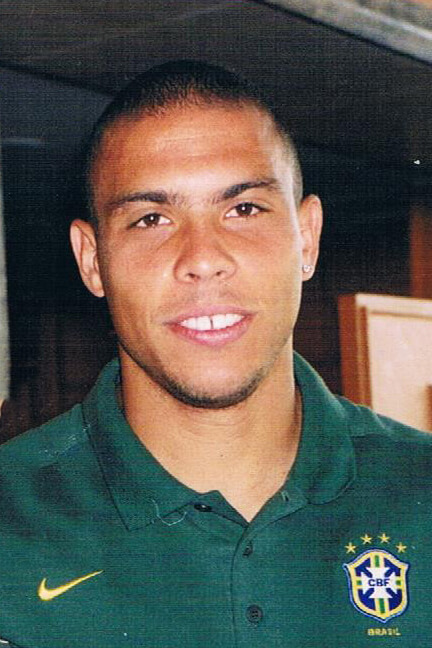
Ronaldo (2002)

| Year | Player | Club |
|---|---|---|
| 1980 | (Uruguay) Waldemar Victorino | (Uruguay) Nacional |
| 1981 | (Brazil) Zico | (Brazil) Flamengo |
| 1982 | (Brazil) Jair | (Uruguay) Peñarol |
| 1983 | (Brazil) Renato Gaúcho | (Brazil) Grêmio |
| 1984 | (Argentina) José Percudani | (Argentina) Independiente |
| 1985 | (France) Michel Platini | (Italy) Juventus |
| 1986 | (Uruguay) Antonio Alzamendi | (Argentina) River Plate |
| 1987 | (Algeria) Rabah Madjer | (Portugal) Porto |
| 1988 | (Uruguay) Santiago Ostolaza | (Uruguay) Nacional |
| 1989 | (Italy) Alberigo Evani | (Italy) Milan |
| 1990 | (Netherlands) Frank Rijkaard | (Italy) Milan |
| 1991 | (Socialist Federal Republic of Yugoslavia) Vladimir Jugović | (Socialist Federal Republic of Yugoslavia) Red Star Belgrade |
| 1992 | (Brazil) Raí | (Brazil) São Paulo |
| 1993 | (Brazil) Toninho Cerezo | (Brazil) São Paulo |
| 1994 | (Argentina) Omar Asad | (Argentina) Vélez Sársfield |
| 1995 | (Netherlands) Danny Blind | (Netherlands) Ajax |
| 1996 | (Italy) Alessandro Del Piero | (Italy) Juventus |
| 1997 | (Germany) Andreas Möller | (Germany) Borussia Dortmund |
| 1998 | (Spain) Raúl | (Spain) Real Madrid |
| 1999 | (Wales) Ryan Giggs | (England) Manchester United |
| 2000 | (Argentina) Martín Palermo | (Argentina) Boca Juniors |
| 2001 | (Ghana) Samuel Kuffour | (Germany) Bayern Munich |
| 2002 | (Brazil) Ronaldo | (Spain) Real Madrid |
| 2003 | (Argentina) Matías Donnet | (Argentina) Boca Juniors |
| 2004 | (Portugal) Maniche | (Portugal) Porto |

== See also ==
- Intercontinental Champions' Supercup
- List of association football competitions
- List of world champion football clubs
- U-20 Intercontinental Cup, its successor
- Copa Rio (international tournament)
