= Sveinbjörn Hákonarson =

Icelandic footballer

Personal information
- Date of birth: 1 November 1957 (age 68)
- Position: Midfielder

Senior career*
Years	Team	Apps	(Gls)
1976–1979	ÍA		
1980–1981	Grimsås IF		
1982–1987	ÍA		
1988–1991	Stjarnan		
1992–1993	Þór		
1994	Þróttur		
1995	Þór		

International career
1983–1992	Iceland	7	(0)
- * Club domestic league appearances and goals

Sveinbjörn Hákonarson (born 1 November 1957) is a retired Icelandic football midfielder.
