= Hans Christiaens =

Belgian footballer (born 1964)

Personal information
- Date of birth: 12 January 1964 (age 62)
- Place of birth: Belgium
- Position: Forward

Senior career*
Years	Team	Apps	(Gls)
-1986	K.S.K. Beveren		
1986-1989	K.S.V. Waregem	14+	(9+)
1989-1991	Club Brugge KV	41	(7)
1991-1993	Brøndby IF	23	(2)
1993-1994	K.S.V. Waregem	12	(3)
1994-1998	K.S.K. Ronse		
1998-1999	SV Wevelgem City		

International career
1988	Belgium	3	(0)
- * Club domestic league appearances and goals

Hans Christiaens (born 12 January 1964) is a Belgian retired footballer.

== Honours ==
Beveren

- Belgian First Division: 1978–79
- Belgian Cup: 1977–78

Club Brugge

- Belgian First Division: 1989–90

Brøndby IF

- Superligaen: 1991
