= Zdeněk Procházka (footballer, born 1960) =

Czech football and manager

Personal information
- Full name: Zdeněk Procházka
- Date of birth: 10 October 1960 (age 66)
- Place of birth: Czechoslovakia
- Position: Forward

Senior career*
Years	Team	Apps	(Gls)
1979–1983	SK Dynamo České Budějovice		
1983–1987	Sparta Prague		
1987–1991	SK Dynamo České Budějovice		
1991–1992	Omonia Aradippou		
1992–1993	SK Dynamo České Budějovice		

Managerial career
- 1997–1998: SK Dynamo České Budějovice
- * Club domestic league appearances and goals

Zdeněk Procházka (born 10 October 1960) is a retired Czech footballer who played as a forward.
