= Oleksandr Lysenko =

Soviet footballer and Ukrainian coach

Personal information
- Full name: Oleksandr Petrovych Lysenko
- Date of birth: 16 February 1956 (age 70)
- Place of birth: Hrebinka, Ukrainian SSR
- Position: Midfielder

Youth career
- ????–1972: Hrebinka sports school
- 1972–1974: Kharkiv sports boarding school

Senior career*
Years	Team	Apps	(Gls)
1974–1976	FC Metalist Kharkiv	94	(8)
1977–1987	FC Dnipro Dnipropetrovsk	258	(23)

Managerial career
- 1989–1991: FC Dnipro-d Dnipropetrovsk
- 1992–1994: FC Dnipro Dnipropetrovsk (assistant)
- 1994: FC Dnipro Dnipropetrovsk
- 1994–1996: FC Dnipro Dnipropetrovsk (assistant)
- 1996–1997: FC Kryvbas Kryvyi Rih (assistant)
- 1997: FC Kryvbas Kryvyi Rih
- 1998–1999: FC Metalurh Novomoskovsk
- 1999–2000: FC Dnipro-3 Dnipropetrovsk
- 2001–2002: FC Dnipro-2 Dnipropetrovsk
- 2003–2004: FC Elektrometalurh-NZF Nikopol
- * Club domestic league appearances and goals

Oleksandr Lysenko (Ukrainian: Олександр Петрович Лисенко; born 16 February 1956, in Hrebinka) is a former Soviet football player and currently a Ukrainian football coach.
