= 1975–76 Juventus FC season =

Italian football club season

Juventus FC
1975–76 season
- Owner: Agnelli family
- President: Giampiero Boniperti
- Manager: Carlo Parola
- Stadium: Comunale
- Serie A: 2nd (in UEFA Cup)
- Coppa Italia: First round
- European Cup: Round of 16
- Top goalscorer: Bettega (15)
- Average home league attendance: 35,410
Home colours	Away colours

During the 1975–76 season, Juventus competed in Serie A, the Coppa Italia, and the European Cup.

== Summary ==
During the summer, president Giampiero Boniperti transferred in midfielder Marco Tardelli from Como Calcio (in an exchange loan of youngster Paolo Rossi to that club) and striker Sergio Gori from Cagliari Calcio (in an exchange in which defender Silvio Longobucco transferred out to the island).

Carlo Parola, in his second season as manager, led the team to a second-place league finish behind champion Torino (for whom this was the first league title in 27 years since the Superga air disaster). During this season, Juventus lost both matches against its local rivals, and disagreements between Parola and several players occurred, especially veterans Fabio Capello and Pietro Anastasi and the group of players headed by Giuseppe Furino and Roberto Bettega. At the end of the season, Boniperti sacked Parola and appointed Giovanni Trapattoni for the next season as head coach.

The team was eliminated from the Coppa Italia in the group phase by Internazionale after a 1–0 defeat in San Siro. In the European Cup, the team won the first-round tie against CSKA Sofia, but was defeated in the round of 16 by German side Borussia Mönchengladbach (with an aggregate score of 1–2).

== Squad ==
Note: Flags indicate national team as defined under FIFA eligibility rules; some limited exceptions apply. Players may hold more than one non-FIFA nationality.

Pos.	Nation	Player
GK	ITA	Dino Zoff
GK	ITA	Giancarlo Alessandrelli
DF	ITA	Gaetano Scirea
DF	ITA	Francesco Morini
DF	ITA	Claudio Gentile
DF	ITA	Luciano Spinosi
MF	ITA	Franco Causio
MF	ITA	Antonello Cuccureddu

Pos.	Nation	Player
MF	ITA	Giuseppe Furino
MF	ITA	Marco Tardelli
MF	ITA	Fabio Capello
MF	ITA	Giuseppe Damiani
FW	ITA	Roberto Bettega
FW	ITA	Sergio Gori
FW	ITA	Pietro Anastasi (Captain)
FW	BRA	José Altafini

=== Transfers ===
In
Pos.	Name	from	Type
MF	Marco Tardelli	Como Calcio	
FW	Sergio Gori	Cagliari Calcio	
GK	Giancarlo Alessandrelli	S.S. Arezzo	loan ended

Out
Pos.	Name	To	Type
GK	Massimo Piloni	Delfino Pescara	
DF	Silvio Longobucco	Cagliari Calcio	
MF	Fernando Viola	Cagliari Calcio	
MF	Alberto Marchetti	Novara F.C.	loan
FW	Paolo Rossi	Como Calcio	loan

== Competitions ==
=== Serie A ===
==== League table ====
Pos	Team	Pld	W	D	L	GF	GA	GD	Pts	Qualification or relegation
1	Torino (C)	30	18	9	3	49	22	+27	45	Qualification to European Cup
2	Juventus	30	18	7	5	46	26	+20	43	Qualification to UEFA Cup
3	Milan	30	15	8	7	42	28	+14	38	Qualification to UEFA Cup
4	Internazionale	30	14	9	7	36	28	+8	37	Qualification to UEFA Cup
5	Napoli	30	13	10	7	40	27	+13	36	Qualification to Cup Winners' Cup

Source: Panini
(C) Champions

==== Results by round ====
Round	1	2	3	4	5	6	7	8	9	10	11	12	13	14	15	16	17	18	19	20	21	22	23	24	25	26	27	28	29	30
Ground	H	A	H	A	H	A	H	A	H	A	A	H	H	A	H	A	H	A	H	A	H	A	H	A	H	H	A	A	H	A
Result	W	D	W	W	W	W	D	L	W	W	W	W	W	W	W	W	D	D	W	W	D	L	L	L	W	D	D	W	W	L
Position	1	1	1	1	1	1	1	2	1	1	1	1	1	1	1	1	1	1	1	1	1	1	1	2	2	2	2	2	2	2

Source: Competitive matches
A = Away; H = Home; W = Win; D = Draw; L = Loss; P = Postponed; = Leader, 1976–77 European Cup; = 1976–77 UEFA Cup; = 1976-77 Serie B

==== Matches ====
5 October 1975 1	Juventus	2–1	Hellas Verona	Turin
15:00 CET	Causio 33' (pen.), 37'	Report	88' Moro	Stadium: Comunale; Referee: Giulio Ciacci

12 October 1975 2	Como Calcio	2–2	Juventus	Como
15:00 CET	Pozzato 31'; Fontolan 62'	Report	1' Furino; 89' (aut) Fontolan	Stadium: Giuseppe Sinigaglia; Referee: Menegali

19 October 1975 3	Juventus	4–2	Fiorentina	Turin
15:00 CET	Gori 20'; Causio 41' (pen.), 72'; Anastasi 78'	Report	23' Speggiorin; 85' Bresciani	Stadium: Comunale; Referee: Agnolin

2 November 1975 4	Cagliari Calcio	0–1	Juventus	Cagliari
14:30 CET		Report	19' Gori	Stadium: Sant'Elia; Referee: Barbaresco

9 November 1975 5	Juventus	2–0	S.S. Lazio	Turin
14:30 CET	Damiani 47', 53'	Report		Stadium: Comunale; Referee: Casarin

16 November 1975 6	AC Milan	0–1	Juventus	Milan
14:30 CET		Report	75' Gori	Stadium: San Siro; Referee: Gino Menicucci

30 November 1975 7	Juventus	3–3	Cesena	Turin
14:30 CET	Capello 49'; Bettega 52'; Gentile 81'	Report	21' (pen.) Frustalupi; 40' Urban; 66' Petrini	Stadium: Comunale; Referee: Cesare Gussoni

7 December 1975 8	Torino	2–0	Juventus	Turin
14:30 CET	Graziani 75'; Pulici 78' (pen.)	Report		Stadium: Comunale; Referee: Alberto Michelotti

14 December 1975 9	Juventus	2–0	Inter	Turin
14:30 CET	Bettega 36'; Tardelli 74'	Report		Stadium: Comunale; Referee: Riccardo Lattanzi

21 December 1975 10	Ascoli Calcio	0–3	Juventus	Ascoli Piceno
14:30 CET		Report	26' Damiani; 41' Gori; 89' Bettega	Stadium: Cino e Lillo Del Duca; Referee: Paolo Casarin

4 January 1976 11	Juventus	2–1	S.S.C. Napoli	Turin
14:30 CET	Damiani 34'; Gori 86'	Report	4' (pen.) Savoldi	Stadium: Comunale; Referee: Michelotti

11 January 1976 12	A.S. Roma	0–1	Juventus	Rome
14:30 CET		Report	46' Bettega	Stadium: Olimpico; Referee: Luigi Agnolin

18 January 1976 13	Juventus	1–0	Bologna F.C.	Turin
14:30 CET	Bettega 15'	Report		Stadium: Comunale; Referee: Domenico Serafino

25 January 1976 14	Sampdoria	0–2	Juventus	Bergamo
14:30 CET		Report	53' Bettega; 79' Causio	Stadium: Comunale; Referee: Paolo Casarin
Note: Played in Bergamo due to a ban on Stadio Luigi Ferraris of Genoa after a field invasion in a match.

1 February 1976 15	Juventus	1–0	Perugia Calcio	Turin
15:00 CET	Damiani 60'	Report		Stadium: Comunale; Referee: Enzo Barbaresco

8 February 1976 16	Hellas Verona	1–2	Juventus	Verona
15:00 CET	Cozzi 6'	Report	53' Tardelli; 63' Bettega	Stadium: Marcantonio Bentegodi; Referee: Riccardo Lattanzi

15 February 1976 17	Juventus	1–1	Como	Turin
15:00 CET	Bettega 56'	Report	57' Pozzato	Stadium: Comunale; Referee: Ciulli

22 February 1976 18	Fiorentina	1–1	Juventus	Florence
15:00 CET	Bresciani 60'	Report	26' Bettega	Stadium: Comunale; Referee: Gianfranco Menegali

29 February 1976 19	Juventus	1–0	Cagliari Calcio	Turin
15:00 CET	Damiani 35' (pen.)	Report		Stadium: Comunale; Referee: Levrero

7 March 1976 20	S.S. Lazio	1–2	Juventus	Rome
15:30 CET	Gentile 10' (o.g.)	Report	37' Bettega; 50' Gori	Stadium: Olimpico; Referee: Panzino

14 March 1976 21	Juventus	1–1	AC Milan	Turin
15:30 CET	Capello 60'	Report	30' Sabadini	Stadium: Comunale; Referee: Agnolin

21 March 1976 22	Cesena	2–1	Juventus	Cesena
15:30 CET	Bertarelli 48', 60'	Report	11' Damiani	Stadium: La Fiorita; Referee: Domenico Serafino

28 March 1976 23	Juventus	0–2 (awarded)	Torino	Turin
15:30 CET	~~Bettega 70'~~	Report	~~2' (aut) Cuccureddu~~; ~~45' (aut) Damiani~~	Stadium: Comunale; Referee: Menicucci
Note: Match finishes 1–2 but Torino were awarded a 2–0 win after Italian Federation sanctioned a throwing of a firework from the stands by Juventus fans exploded next to Castellini at the end of the first half.

4 April 1976 24	Inter	1–0	Juventus	Milan
15:30 CET	Bertini 80'	Report		Stadium: San Siro; Referee: Alberto Michelotti

11 April 1976 25	Juventus	2–1	Ascoli Calcio	Bergamo
15:30 CET	Bettega 13'; Altafini 71'	Report	53' (pen.) Gola	Stadium: Comunale; Referee: Lazzaroni
Note: Played in Bergamo due to a ban against Juventus;

18 April 1976 26	S.S.C. Napoli	1–1	Juventus	Naples
15:30 CET	Boccolini 40'	Report	55' Bettega	Stadium: San Paolo; Referee: Paolo Casarin

25 April 1976 27	Juventus	1–1	A.S. Roma	Turin
15:30 CET	Bettega 33'	Report	63' Petrini	Stadium: Comunale; Referee: Prati

2 May 1976 28	Bologna F.C.	1–4	Juventus	Bologna
16:00 CET	Massimelli 59'	Report	36' Gori; 69' (o.g.) Mancini; 76', 87' Bettega	Stadium: Comunale; Referee: Giulio Ciacci

9 May 1976 29	Juventus	2–0	Sampdoria	Turin
16:00 CET	Capello 47'; Furino 72'	Report		Stadium: Comunale; Referee: Alberto Michelotti

16 May 1976 30	Perugia Calcio	1–0	Juventus	Perugia
16:00 CET	Curi 55'	Report		Stadium: Comunale; Referee: Gianfranco Menegali

=== Coppa Italia ===
==== Group 1 ====
Pos	Team	Pld	W	D	L	GF	GA	GD	Pts
1	Internazionale (A)	4	4	0	0	7	0	+7	8
2	Juventus (A)	4	2	1	1	9	4	+5	5
3	Taranto (B)	4	2	0	2	4	4	0	4
4	Ternana (B)	4	1	0	3	5	10	−5	2
5	Sambenedettese (B)	4	0	1	3	3	10	−7	1

Source: rsssf.com
Rules for classification: 1) points; 2) goal difference; 3) number of goals scored.
(A) Serie A; (B) Serie B

===== Matches =====
27 August 1975 1	Juventus	2–0	Taranto	Turin
20:30 CEST	Bettega 67'; Causio 89'	Report		Stadium: Comunale; Referee: Vittorio Benedetti

31 August 1975 2	Inter	1–0	Juventus	Milan
20:30 CEST	Libera 34'	Report		Stadium: San Siro; Attendance: 65,500; Referee: Arnaldo Prati
Note: Rescheduled from 21:00, match started 30 minutes later.

7 September 1975 3	Juventus	5–1	Ternana	Turin
20:30 CEST	Damiani 5'; Anastasi 55'; Bettega 64'; Altafini 65'; Cuccureddu 80'	Report	30' Traini	Stadium: Comunale; Referee: Fernando Lazzaroni

21 September 1975 5	Sambenedettese	2–2	Juventus	San Benedetto del Tronto
16:30 CEST	Chimenti 45'; Simonato 50'	Report	26', 31' Capello	Stadium: Fratelli Ballarin; Referee: Pierluigi Levrero

=== European Cup ===
==== First round ====
17 September 1975 1	CSKA Sofia (Bulgaria)	2–1	(Italy) Juventus	Sofia
19:00 CEST	Penev 80'; Marasliev 89'	Report	40' Anastasi	Stadium: Natsionalen Stadion Vasil Levski; Referee: (Belgium) Rion

1 October 1975 2	Juventus (Italy)	2–0	(Bulgaria) CSKA Sofia	Turin
20:30 CET	Furino 39'; Anastasi 52'	Report		Stadium: Comunale; Referee: (Scotland) Davidson

==== Second round ====
22 October 1975	Borussia Mönchengladbach (West Germany)	2–0	(Italy) Juventus	Düsseldorf
20:00 CET	Heynckes 27'; Simonsen 36'	Report		Stadium: Rheinstadion; Attendance: 57,195; Referee: (France) Wurtz
Note: Match not played in Bökelbergstadion at Mönchengladbach due to expecting a high-attendance.

5 November 1975	Juventus (Italy)	2–2	(West Germany) Borussia Mönchengladbach	Turin
20:30 CET	Gori 35'; Bettega 62'	Report	70' Danner; 88' Simonsen	Stadium: Comunale; Attendance: 62,773; Referee: (Austria) Linemayr

== Statistics ==
=== Players statistics ===
No.	Pos	Nat	Player	Total		1975-76 Serie A		1975-76 Coppa Italia		1975-76 European Cup	
No.	Pos	Nat	Player	Apps	Goals	Apps	Goals	Apps	Goals	Apps	Goals
	GK	(Italy) ITA	Dino Zoff	30	0	30	0				
	DF	(Italy) ITA	Antonello Cuccureddu	28	0	28	0				
	DF	(Italy) ITA	Gaetano Scirea	30	0	30	0				
	DF	(Italy) ITA	Francesco Morini	25	0	25	0				
	DF	(Italy) ITA	Claudio Gentile	22	1	21+1	1				
	MF	(Italy) ITA	Franco Causio	29	5	29	5				
	MF	(Italy) ITA	Marco Tardelli	26	2	25+1	2				
	MF	(Italy) ITA	Giuseppe Furino	26	2	26	2				
	MF	(Italy) ITA	Fabio Capello	27	3	27	3				
	FW	(Italy) ITA	Roberto Bettega	29	15	29	15				
	FW	(Italy) ITA	Sergio Gori	22	6	19+3	6				
	GK	(Italy) ITA	Giancarlo Alessandrelli	0	0	0	0				
	MF	(Italy) ITA	Giuseppe Damiani	20	7	19+1	7				
	FW	(Italy) ITA	Pietro Anastasi	16	1	15+1	1				
	DF	(Italy) ITA	Luciano Spinosi	7	0	6+1	0				
	FW	(Brazil) BRA	José Altafini	10	1	1+9	1				
	GK	(Italy) ITA	Carraro	0	0	0	0				
	MF	(Italy) ITA	Gianluigi Savoldi	0	0	0	0				

- Source: http://calcio-seriea.net/presenze/1975/760/
