= 1976–77 Juventus FC season =

Italian football club season

Juventus Football Club
1976–77 season
- Chairman: Giampiero Boniperti
- Manager: Giovanni Trapattoni
- Serie A: 1st (in European Cup)
- Coppa Italia: Second round
- UEFA Cup: Winners
- Top goalscorer: League: Bettega(17); All: Bettega(23)
- Average home league attendance: 41,892
Home colours	Away colours

The 1976–77 season was Juventus Football Club's 79nd in existence and in the top-flight of Italian football.

== Summary ==
Before the season began, Juventus made many changes, starting with Giovanni Trapattoni now being manager of the team, and newcomers Roberto Boninsegna and Romeo Benetti replacing Pietro Anastasi and Fabio Capello to reinforce the squad.

It was memorable season for the Bianconeri due to finishing the season as league champions with 51 points, just one point ahead of their crosstown rivals and last season's champions Turin.

Four days before clinching its 17th Serie A trophy, the team won the UEFA Cup, the first European trophy in its history, defeating Basque side Athletic Bilbao in the Final at San Mames.

== Squad ==
Note: Flags indicate national team as defined under FIFA eligibility rules; some limited exceptions apply. Players may hold more than one non-FIFA nationality.

Pos.	Nation	Player
GK	ITA	Dino Zoff
GK	ITA	Giancarlo Alessandrelli
DF	ITA	Claudio Gentile
DF	ITA	Gaetano Scirea
DF	ITA	Antonello Cuccureddu
DF	ITA	Francesco Morini
DF	ITA	Luciano Spinosi
DF	ITA	Antonio Cabrini
MF	ITA	Romeo Benetti

Pos.	Nation	Player
MF	ITA	Franco Causio
MF	ITA	Marco Tardelli
MF	ITA	Giuseppe Furino (Captain)
MF	ITA	Alberto Marchetti
MF	ITA	Gian Piero Gasperini
FW	ITA	Roberto Boninsegna
FW	ITA	Roberto Bettega
FW	ITA	Sergio Gori
FW	ITA	Luigi Capuzzo

=== Transfers ===
In
Pos.	Name	from	Type
DF	Antonio Cabrini	Atalanta BC	
FW	Roberto Boninsegna	Internazionale	
MF	Romeo Benetti	AC Milan	
MF	Gian Piero Gasperini		

Out
Pos.	Name	To	Type
FW	Pietro Anastasi	Internazionale	
MF	Fabio Capello	AC Milan	
MF	Oscar Damiani	Genoa CFC	
FW	Jose Altafini	FC Chiasso	
FW	Paolo Rossi	LR Vicenza	loan

== Competitions ==
=== Serie A ===
==== League table ====
Pos	Team	Pld	W	D	L	GF	GA	GD	Pts	Qualification or relegation
1	Juventus (C)	30	23	5	2	50	20	+30	51	Qualification to European Cup
2	Torino	30	21	8	1	51	14	+37	50	Qualification to UEFA Cup
3	Fiorentina	30	12	11	7	38	31	+7	35	Qualification to UEFA Cup
4	Internazionale	30	10	13	7	34	27	+7	33	Qualification to UEFA Cup
5	Lazio	30	10	11	9	34	28	+6	31	Qualification to UEFA Cup

Source: Panini
(C) Champions

==== Results by round ====
Round	1	2	3	4	5	6	7	8	9	10	11	12	13	14	15	16	17	18	19	20	21	22	23	24	25	26	27	28	29	30
Ground	A	H	A	H	A	H	A	H	H	A	H	A	H	A	H	H	A	H	A	H	A	H	A	A	H	A	H	A	H	A
Result	W	W	W	W	W	W	W	L	D	W	W	W	W	L	W	W	D	W	W	W	D	W	D	W	W	D	W	W	W	W
Position	2	2	2	2	2	1	1	2	2	2	2	2	1	2	2	1	2	1	1	1	2	1	1	1	1	2	1	1	1	1

Source: Competitive matches
A = Away; H = Home; W = Win; D = Draw; L = Loss; = 1977–78 European Cup; = 1977–78 UEFA Cup

==== Matches ====
3 October 1976 1	Lazio	2–3	Juventus	Rome
	55' Re Cecconi; 89'Giordano	Report	12'Bettega; 54'Boninsegna; 70'Bettega	Stadium: Olimpico

10 October 1976 2	Juventus	1–0	Genoa	Turin
	25'Boninsegna	Report		Stadium: Comunale

24 October 1976 3	Foggia	0–1	Juventus	Foggia
		Report	74'Bettega	Stadium: Pino Zaccheria

31 October 1976 4	Juventus	3–0	Catanzaro	Turin
	9'Gentile; 53'Bettega; 82'Cuccureddu	Report		Stadium: Comunale

7 November 1976 5	Milan	2–3	Juventus	Milan
	13' Calloni; 17' (o.g.) Tardelli	Report	21' Bettega; 54' Benetti; 80' Bettega	Stadium: San Siro

21 November 1976 6	Juventus	2–1	Hellas Verona	Turin
	69' Bettega; 87' Causio	Report	90' Luppi	Stadium: Comunale

28 November 1976 7	Cesena	0–1	Juventus	Cesena
		Report	80' Boninsegna	Stadium: La Fiorita

5 December 1976 8	Juventus	0–2	Torino	Turin
		Report	19' Graziani F. 79' Pulici P.	Stadium: Comunale

12 December 1976 9	Juventus	0–0	Fiorentina	Turin
		Report		Stadium: Comunale

19 December 1976 10	Bologna	0–1	Juventus	Bologna
		Report	3' Causio	Stadium: Comunale

2 January 1977 11	Juventus	1–0	Perugia	Turin
	51' (o.g.) Berni	Report		Stadium: Comunale

9 January 1977 12	Napoli	0–2	Juventus	Naples
		Report	70' Boninsegna; 76' Scirea	Stadium: Stadio San Paolo
Note: Suspended at 80' due to throwing objects by Napoli fans. Awarded on table by The Sport Justice Court.

16 January 1977 13	Juventus	2–0	Inter	Turin
	21' Boninsegna; 62' Boninsegna	Report		Stadium: Comunale

30 January 1977 14	Roma	3–1	Juventus	Rome
	13' Di Bartolomei; 32' Conti B. 68' (o.g.) Morini F.	Report	88' Bettega	Stadium: Stadio Olimpico

6 February 1977 15	Juventus	3–0	Sampdoria	Turin
	34' Tardelli; 41' Tardelli; 76' Bettega	Report		Stadium: Comunale

13 February 1977 16	Juventus	2–0	Lazio	Turin
	40' Tardelli; 78' (pen.) Boninsegna	Report		Stadium: Comunale

20 February 1977 17	Genoa	2–2	Juventus	Genoa
	61' Ghetti; 64' Damiani	Report	19' Boninsegna; 74' Bettega	Stadium: Stadio Luigi Ferraris

27 February 1977 18	Juventus	1–0	Foggia	Turin
	12' Bettega	Report		Stadium: Comunale

6 March 1977 19	Catanzaro	0–2	Juventus	Catanzaro
		Report	69' Scirea; 81' (o.g.) Silipo	Stadium: Comunale

13 March 1977 20	Juventus	2–1	Milan	Turin
	38' (pen.) Boninsegna; 40' Causio	Report	3' (o.g.) Scirea	Stadium: Comunale

20 March 1977 21	Hellas Verona	0–0	Juventus	Verona
		Report		Stadium: Stadio Marcantonio Bentegodi

27 March 1977 22	Juventus	3–2	Cesena	Turin
	14' Benetti; 68' Bettega; 75' Benetti	Report	48' (o.g.) Morini F 88' Palese	Stadium: Comunale

3 April 1977 23	Torino	1–1	Juventus	Turin
	8' Pulici P	Report	6' Causio	Stadium: Comunale

10 April 1977 24	Fiorentina	1–3	Juventus	Florence
	86' (pen.) Casarsa	Report	48' Cabrini; 50' Benetti; 69' Bettega	Stadium: Comunale

17 April 1977 25	Juventus	2–1	Bologna	Turin
	10' (pen.) Boninsegna; 69' Bettega	Report	31' Clerici	Stadium: Comunale

24 April 1977 26	Perugia	1–1	Juventus	Perugia
	31' Vannini	Report	19' Causio	Stadium: Comunale di Pian di Massiano

1 May 1977 27	Juventus	2–1	Napoli	Turin
	15' Bettega; 86' Furino	Report	79' Massa	Stadium: Comunale

8 May 1977 28	Inter	0–2	Juventus	Milan
		Report	37' Gori S. 63' Tardelli	Stadium: San Siro

14 May 1977 29	Juventus	1–0	Roma	Turin
	11' Bettega	Report		Stadium: Comunale

22 May 1977 30	Sampdoria	0–2	Juventus	Genoa
		Report	61' Bettega; 84' Boninsegna	Stadium: Stadio Luigi Ferraris

=== Coppa Italia ===
==== First round ====
Pos	Team	Pld	W	D	L	GF	GA	GD	Pts
1	Juventus	4	2	2	0	7	1	+6	6
2	Genoa	4	2	2	0	6	2	+4	6
3	Hellas Verona	4	2	0	2	3	6	−3	4
4	Monza	4	0	3	1	3	4	−1	3
5	Sambenedettese	4	0	1	3	1	7	−6	1

Date	Opponent	Venue	Result F–A
29 August 1976	Monza	A	1–1
1 September 1976	Hellas Verona	H	2–0
5 September 1976	Sambenedettese	H	4–0
19 September 1976	Genoa	A	0–0

==== Second round ====
Pos	Team	Pld	W	D	L	GF	GA	GD	Pts
1	Internazionale	6	3	3	0	7	2	+5	9
2	Juventus	6	2	2	2	8	7	+1	6
3	Vicenza	6	2	1	3	9	11	−2	5
4	Lecce	6	0	4	2	4	8	−4	4

Date	Opponent	Venue	Result F–A
12 June 1977	Inter Milan	H	0–1
15 June 1977	Lecce	H	1–1
19 June 1977	Inter Milan	A	0–1
22 June 1977	Lanerossi Vicenza	A	4–2
26 June 1977	Lecce	A	1–1
29 June 1977	Lanerossi Vicenza	H	2–1

=== UEFA Cup ===
==== First round ====
15 September 1976 First leg	Manchester City (England)	1–0	Juventus	Manchester
	Kidd 44'	Report		Stadium: Maine Road; Attendance: 36,955; Referee: Walter Hungerbühler (Switzerland)

29 September 1976 Second leg	Juventus	2–0	(England) Manchester City	Turin
	Scirea 36'; Boninsegna 69'	Report		Stadium: Stadio Comunale; Attendance: 46,472; Referee: Francis Rion (Belgium)

==== Second round ====
20 October 1976 First leg	Manchester United (England)	1–0	Juventus	Manchester
	Hill 32'	Report		Stadium: Old Trafford; Attendance: 59,021; Referee: Ferdinand Biwersi (West Germany)

3 November 1976 Second leg	Juventus	3–0	(England) Manchester United	Turin
	Boninsegna 29', 63'; Benetti 85'	Report		Stadium: Stadio Comunale; Attendance: 66,632; Referee: Károly Palotai (Hungary)

==== Third round ====
24 November 1976 First leg	Juventus	3–0	(Soviet Union) Shakhtar Donetsk	Turin
20:30	Bettega 16'; Tardelli 19'; Boninsegna 38'	Report		Stadium: Stadio Comunale; Attendance: 42,545; Referee: Dušan Maksimović (Yugoslavia)

8 December 1976 Second leg	Shakhtar Donetsk (Soviet Union)	1–0	Juventus	Donetsk
19:00	Shevlyuk 35'	Report		Stadium: Shakhtar Central Stadium; Attendance: 38,000; Referee: Hilmi Ok (Turkey)

==== Quarter-final ====
2 March 1977 First leg	Magdeburg (East Germany)	1–3	Juventus	Magdeburg
	Sparwasser 32'	Report	Cuccureddu 2'; Benetti 58'; Boninsegna 60'	Stadium: Ernst Grube Stadium; Attendance: 33,000; Referee: Thomas Reynolds (Wales)

16 March 1977 Second leg	Juventus	1–0	(East Germany) Magdeburg	Turin
	Cuccureddu 16'	Report		Stadium: Stadio Comunale; Attendance: 45,541; Referee: Ken Burns (England)

==== Semi-final ====
6 April 1977 First leg	Juventus	4–1	(Greece) AEK Athens	Turin
	Cuccureddu 18'; Bettega 59', 83'; Causio 67'	Report	Papadopoulos 31'	Stadium: Stadio Comunale; Attendance: 60,922; Referee: Viktor Zharkov (Soviet Union)

20 April 1977 Second leg	AEK Athens (Greece)	0–1	Juventus	Nea Filadelfeia
		Report	Bettega 84'	Stadium: AEK Stadium; Attendance: 32,000; Referee: Károly Palotai (Hungary)

==== Final ====
4 May 1977	Juventus	1–0	(Spain) Athletic Bilbao	Turin
	Tardelli 15'	Report Overview (archive) Overview		Stadium: Comunale; Attendance: 54,800

18 May 1977	Athletic Bilbao (Spain)	2–1	Juventus	Bilbao
	Irureta 11'; Carlos 78'	Report Overview (archive) Overview	Bettega 7'	Stadium: Estadio San Mames; Attendance: 39,700

== Statistics ==
=== Players statistics ===
No.	Pos	Nat	Player	Total		1976–77 Serie A	
No.	Pos	Nat	Player	Apps	Goals	Apps	Goals
	GK	(Italy) ITA	Dino Zoff	30	-20	30	-20
	DF	(Italy) ITA	Antonello Cuccureddu	29	1	29	1
	DF	(Italy) ITA	Gaetano Scirea	30	1	30	1
	DF	(Italy) ITA	Francesco Morini	26	0	26	0
	DF	(Italy) ITA	Claudio Gentile	29	1	29	1
	MF	(Italy) ITA	Franco Causio	30	5	30	5
	MF	(Italy) ITA	Marco Tardelli	28	4	28	4
	MF	(Italy) ITA	Giuseppe Furino	26	1	25+1	1
	MF	(Italy) ITA	Romeo Benetti	30	4	30	4
	FW	(Italy) ITA	Roberto Boninsegna	29	10	29	10
	FW	(Italy) ITA	Roberto Bettega	30	17	30	17
	GK	(Italy) ITA	Giancarlo Alessandrelli	0	0	0	0
	MF	(Italy) ITA	Alberto Marchetti	6	0	5+1	0
	DF	(Italy) ITA	Luciano Spinosi	7	0	4+3	0
	DF	(Italy) ITA	Antonio Cabrini	7	1	4+3	1
	FW	(Italy) ITA	Sergio Gori	7	1	1+6	1
	FW	(Italy) ITA	Luigi Capuzzo	0	0	0	0
	MF	(Italy) ITA	Gian Piero Gasperini				

- Source: http://calcio-seriea.net/presenze/1976/779/

=== Topscorers ===
23 goals

- (Italy) Roberto Bettega

20 goals

- (Italy) Roberto Boninsegna

7 goals

- (Italy) Franco Causio
- (Italy) Marco Tardelli

6 goals

- (Italy) Romeo Benetti

4 goals

- (Italy) Antonello Cuccureddu

2 goals

- (Italy) Giuseppe Furino
- (Italy) Sergio Gori
- (Italy) Gaetano Scirea

1 goal

- (Italy) Antonio Cabrini
- (Italy) Lorenzo Cascella
- (Italy) Francesco Della Monica
- (Italy) Fabio Francisca
- (Italy) Claudio Gentile
