= 1977–78 Juventus FC season =

Italian football club season

Juventus
1977–78 season
- Chairman: Giampiero Boniperti
- Manager: Giovanni Trapattoni
- Stadium: Comunale
- Serie A: 1st (in European Cup)
- Coppa Italia: Second round
- European Cup: Semi-finals
- Top goalscorer: League: Bettega (11); All: Bettega (13)
Home colours	Away colours

In the 1977–78 season Juventus competed in Serie A, Coppa Italia and UEFA Cup.

== Summary ==
After winning last season's league title with a record-breaking tally of 51 points, the club did not make substantial changes in their first line-up and brought young promises such as Pietro Paolo Virdis, Pierino Fanna and Vinicio Verza to their debut at top level.

The team was defeated in Rome 0–3 by Lazio, which was their only loss in the first half of the season. Liedholm and his Milan were Juventus' biggest challengers of the season and finished the first half of the league season at the top. However, with a draw at Bergamo, they were reached in first place by Juventus; the next week the Bianconeri took the leadership, grabbing the 'Winter title' with 2 points ahead of local rivals Turin.

The second half of the tournament for Juventus was calm with the Bianconeri not losing a single game for the rest of the tournament. Juventus secured the championship after drawing away to Roma with game to spare.

In Coppa Italia, the team suffered a shocking elimination in Second round. In European Cup, the squad reached the Semi-finals, being surprisingly eliminated by Belgian Club Brugge its coach over the two legs.

After the team clinched the title, Italian national team manager Enzo Bearzot called up eight players as regulars starters from this Juventus squad — Zoff, Gentile, Scirea, Benetti, Tardelli, Bettega, Cabrini and Causio — during the 1978 FIFA World Cup in Argentina (also Cuccureddu was called), where they reached a decent 4th place. This group of players was known as Blocco-Juve (Juve Block), or Blocco Juventus

== Squad ==
Note: Flags indicate national team as defined under FIFA eligibility rules; some limited exceptions apply. Players may hold more than one non-FIFA nationality.

Pos.	Nation	Player
GK	ITA	Dino Zoff
GK	ITA	Giancarlo Alessandrelli
DF	ITA	Claudio Gentile
DF	ITA	Francesco Morini
DF	ITA	Gaetano Scirea
DF	ITA	Antonio Cabrini
DF	ITA	Luciano Spinosi
MF	ITA	Franco Causio
MF	ITA	Antonello Cuccureddu

Pos.	Nation	Player
MF	ITA	Giuseppe Furino (C)
MF	ITA	Romeo Benetti
MF	ITA	Marco Tardelli
MF	ITA	Pietro Fanna
MF	ITA	Vinicio Verza
MF	ITA	Gian Piero Gasperini
FW	ITA	Roberto Bettega
FW	ITA	Roberto Boninsegna
FW	ITA	Pietro Paolo Virdis

=== Transfers ===
In
Pos.	Name	from	Type
MF	Vinicio Verza	Lanerossi Vicenza	
MF	Pietro Fanna	Atalanta BC	
FW	Pietro Paolo Virdis	Cagliari	

Out
Pos.	Name	To	Type
MF	Alberto Marchetti	AS Roma	
FW	Sergio Gori	Hellas Verona	
MF	Gian Piero Gasperini	AC Reggiana	loan

== Competitions ==
=== Serie A ===
==== League table ====
Pos	Team	Pld	W	D	L	GF	GA	GD	Pts	Qualification or relegation
1	Juventus (C)	30	15	14	1	46	17	+29	44	Qualification to European Cup
2	Vicenza	30	14	11	5	50	34	+16	39	Qualification to UEFA Cup
3	Torino	30	14	11	5	36	23	+13	39	Qualification to UEFA Cup
4	Milan	30	12	13	5	38	25	+13	37	Qualification to UEFA Cup
5	Internazionale	30	13	10	7	35	24	+11	36	Qualification to Cup Winners' Cup

Source: Panini
(C) Champions

==== Results by round ====
Round	1	2	3	4	5	6	7	8	9	10	11	12	13	14	15	16	17	18	19	20	21	22	23	24	25	26	27	28	29	30
Ground	A	H	A	H	A	H	A	H	H	A	H	A	H	A	H	H	A	H	A	H	A	H	A	A	H	A	H	A	H	A
Result	W	W	D	L	W	D	D	D	W	D	W	W	W	W	D	D	W	D	W	D	W	W	W	D	D	D	D	W	D	W
Position	1	1	1	2	1	2	2	3	2	2	2	1	1	1	1	1	1	1	1	1	1	1	1	1	1	1	1	1	1	1

Source: Competitive matches
A = Away; H = Home; W = Win; D = Draw; L = Loss; = 1978–79 European Cup; = 1978–79 UEFA Cup; = Relegation to 1978–79 Serie B

==== Matches ====
11 September 1977 1	Juventus	6–0	Foggia	Turin
	48' Bettega; 57' Bettega; 71' Bonisegna; 80' Cuccureddu; 84' Bonisegna; 87' (o.g.) Bruschini (F)	Report		Stadium: Comunale

18 September 1977 2	Napoli	1–2	Juventus	Naples
	59' Pin	Report	7'Gentile; 70' Virdis	Stadium: Stadio San Paolo

25 September 1977 3	Juventus	1–1	Milan	Turin
	2'Gentile	Report	48' Maldera Al.	Stadium: Comunale

2 October 1977 4	Lazio	3–0	Juventus	Rome
	3' Garlaschelli; 55' Giordano; 67'Giordano	Report		Stadium: Stadio Olimpico

23 October 1977 5	Juventus	5–1	Fiorentina	Turin
	10' Bonisegna; 11' Tardelli; 18' (o.g.)Della Martira; 49'Causio; 54' Benetti	Report	21' Caso	Stadium: Comunale

30 October 1977 6	Perugia	0–0	Juventus	Perugia
		Report		Stadium: Stadio Pian di Massiano; Referee: Menegali

6 November 1977 7	Juventus	1–1	Atalanta	Turin
	4'Benetti	Report	28'Libera	Stadium: Comunale

20 November 1977 8	Hellas Verona	0–0	Juventus	Verona
		Report		Stadium: Stadio Marcantonio Bentegodi

27 November 1977 9	Juventus	4–0	Genoa	Turin
	68' Tardelli; 83' Causio; 74' (o.g.)Ogliari; 86' (o.g.)Onofri	Report		Stadium: Comunale

11 December 1977 10	Torino	0–0	Juventus	Turin
		Report		Stadium: Comunale

18 December 1977 11	Inter	0–1	Juventus	Milan
		Report	85'Tardelli	Stadium: Stadio San Siro

31 December 1977 12	Juventus	1–0	Bologna	Turin
	77'Causio	Report		Stadium: Comunale

8 January 1978 13	Pescara	1–2	Juventus	Pescara
	37' (pen.) Nobili	Report	50'Fanna; 51' Bettega	Stadium: Stadio Adriatico; Referee: Ciacci

15 January 1978 14	Juventus	2–0	Roma	Turin
	61' Fanna; 72'Bettega	Report		Stadium: Comunale

22 January 1978 15	Lanerossi Vicenza	0–0	Juventus	Vicenza
		Report		Stadium: Stadio Romeo Menti

29 January 1978 16	Foggia	0–0	Juventus	Foggia
		Report		Stadium: Stadio Pino Zaccheria; Referee: Menegali

5 February 1978 17	Juventus	1–0	Napoli	Turin
	3' Bonisegna	Report		Stadium: Comunale

12 February 1978 18	Milan	0–0	Juventus	Milan
		Report		Stadium: Stadio San Siro

19 February 1978 19	Juventus	3–0	Lazio	Turin
	5' Bettega; 68' Bonisegna; 82' (pen.) Bonisegna	Report		Stadium: Comunale

26 February 1978 20	Fiorentina	1–1	Juventus	Florence
	23' Bonisegna	Report	40' Galdiolo	Stadium: Comunale

5 March 1978 21	Juventus	2–0	Perugia	Turin
	15' Bettega; 75' Benetti	Report		Stadium: Comunale

12 March 1978 22	Atalanta	0–2	Juventus	Bergamo
		Report	56' Verza; 82' Benetti	Stadium: Comunale

19 March 1978 23	Juventus	1–0	Hellas Verona	Turin
	7' Bettega	Report		Stadium: Comunale

26 March 1978 24	Genoa	2–2	Juventus	Genoa
	49' Ghetti; 82' Damiani	Report	19' Tardelli; 75' Bonisegna	Stadium: Luigi Ferraris

2 April 1978 25	Juventus	0–0	Torino	Turin
		Report		Stadium: Comunale

9 April 1978 26	Juventus	2–2	Inter Milan	Turin
	33' Bettega; 41' Cuccureddu	Report	25' Bini; 26' Muraro	Stadium: Comunale

16 April 1978 27	Bologna	1–1	Juventus	Bologna
	27' Maselli	Report	23' Gentile	Stadium: Stadio Renato dall'Ara

23 April 1978 28	Juventus	2–0	Pescara	Turin
	10' Bonisegna; 86' Benetti	Report		Stadium: Comunale

30 April 1978 29	Roma	1–1	Juventus	Rome
	56' Di Bartolomei	Report	38' Bettega	Stadium: Olimpico

7 May 1978 30	Juventus	3–2	Lanerossi Vicenza	Turin
	20' Bettega; 36'Bonisegna; 63' Bettega	Report	25' Rossi; 44' (o.g.) Furino	Stadium: Comunale

=== Coppa Italia ===
==== First round ====
Group 1
Pos	Team	Pld	W	D	L	GF	GA	GD	Pts
1	Juventus(A)	4	3	1	0	8	2	+6	7
2	Cesena(B)	4	2	1	1	6	3	+3	5
3	Brescia(B)	4	2	0	2	3	4	−1	4
4	Sambenedettese(B)	4	1	0	3	6	9	−3	2
5	Hellas Verona(A)	4	1	0	3	6	11	−5	2

==== Second round ====
Group B
Pos	Team	Pld	W	D	L	GF	GA	GD	Pts
1	Napoli(A)	6	3	2	1	10	2	+8	8
2	Milan(A)	6	3	2	1	11	5	+6	8
3	Juventus(A)	6	2	1	3	7	14	−7	5
4	Taranto(B)	6	0	3	3	3	10	−7	3

=== European Cup ===
==== First round ====
14 September 1977	Omonia (Cyprus)	0–3	(Italy) Juventus	Nicosia
		Report	Bettega 34'; Fanna 42'; Virdis 59'	Stadium: GSP Stadium; Attendance: 12,000; Referee: (Bulgaria) Nikola Dudin

28 September 1977	Juventus (Italy)	2–0	(Cyprus) Omonia	Turin
	Boninsegna 11'; Virdis 75'	Report		Stadium: Comunale

==== Second round ====
19 October 1977	Glentoran (Northern Ireland)	0–1	(Italy) Juventus	Belfast
		Report	Causio 38'

2 November 1977	Juventus (Italy)	5–0	(Northern Ireland) Glentoran	Turin
	Virdis 10', 20'; Boninsegna 53'; Fanna 70'; Benetti 77'	Report		Stadium: Comunale; Attendance: 35,000; Referee: (Romania) Francisc Coloşi

==== Quarterfinals ====
1 March 1978	Ajax (Netherlands)	1–1	(Italy) Juventus	Amsterdam
	Van Dord 86'	Report	Causio 89'	Stadium: Olympisch Stadion; Attendance: 35,000; Referee: (East Germany) Adolf Prokop

15 March 1978	Juventus (Italy)	1–1 (a.e.t.) (3–0 p)	(Netherlands) Ajax	Turin
	Tardelli 21'	Report	Ling 80'	Stadium: Stadio Comunale; Attendance: 67,000; Referee: (Hungary) Károly Palotai
	Penalties
	Gentile (penalty missed); Benetti (penalty scored); Cabrini (penalty scored); Causio (penalty scored)		(penalty missed) Geels; (penalty missed) Van Dord; (penalty missed) Ling

==== Semifinals ====
29 March 1978	Juventus (Italy)	1–0	(Belgium) Club Brugge	Turin
	Bettega 86'	Report		Stadium: Comunale; Attendance: 70,000; Referee: (Switzerland) Jean Dubach

12 April 1978	Club Brugge (Belgium)	2–0 (a.e.t.)	(Italy) Juventus	Bruges
	Bastijns 3'; Vandereycken 116'	Report		Stadium: Olympiastadion; Attendance: 32,000; Referee: (Sweden) Ulf Eriksson

== Statistics ==
=== Players statistics ===
No.	Pos	Nat	Player	Total		1977–78 Serie A	
No.	Pos	Nat	Player	Apps	Goals	Apps	Goals
	GK	(Italy) ITA	Dino Zoff	30	-17	30	-17
	DF	(Italy) ITA	Antonello Cuccureddu	30	2	30	2
	DF	(Italy) ITA	Gaetano Scirea	29	0	29	0
	DF	(Italy) ITA	Francesco Morini	26	0	26	0
	DF	(Italy) ITA	Claudio Gentile	28	3	28	3
	MF	(Italy) ITA	Franco Causio	30	3	30	3
	MF	(Italy) ITA	Marco Tardelli	26	4	26	4
	MF	(Italy) ITA	Giuseppe Furino	26	0	25+1	0
	MF	(Italy) ITA	Romeo Benetti	27	5	27	5
	FW	(Italy) ITA	Roberto Bettega	30	11	30	11
	FW	(Italy) ITA	Roberto Boninsegna	21	10	19+2	10
	GK	(Italy) ITA	Giancarlo Alessandrelli	0	0	0	0
	DF	(Italy) ITA	Antonio Cabrini	15	0	8+7	0
	MF	(Italy) ITA	Pietro Fanna	13	2	9+4	2
	FW	(Italy) ITA	Pietro Paolo Virdis	10	1	6+4	1
	DF	(Italy) ITA	Luciano Spinosi	5	0	5	0
	MF	(Italy) ITA	Vinicio Verza	5	1	2+3	1
	GK	(Italy) ITA	Luciano Marchese	0	0	0	0
	MF	(Italy) ITA	Gian Piero Gasperini				

- Source: http://calcio-seriea.net/presenze/1977/794/

== See also ==
Blocco-Juve
