= 1978–79 Juventus FC season =

Italian football club season

Juventus FC
1978–79 season
- Owner: Agnelli family
- President: Giampiero Boniperti
- Manager: Giovanni Trapattoni
- Stadium: Comunale
- Serie A: 3rd
- Coppa Italia: Winners (in 1979-80 UEFA Cup Winners' Cup)
- European Cup: Eightfinals
- Top goalscorer: League: Bettega (9); All: Bettega (11)
- Average home league attendance: 35,410
Home colours	Away colours

During the 1978–79 season Juventus competed in Serie A, Coppa Italia and European Cup.

== Summary ==
During the summer, Bearzot appointed his Blocco-Juve for the 1978 FIFA World Cup, therefore Dino Zoff, Scirea, Gentile, Cabrini, Cuccureddu, Benetti, Tardelli, Causio and Bettega, arrived with a surplus of matches for the 1978–79 campaign. The incumbent league champion was out of the title race in early stages against A.C. Milan of Liedholm and the undefeated Perugia of Castagner.

In his seventh year as Chairman, Boniperti made only one transfer to the squad, as the defender Brio's loan from Pistoiese ended, with his replacement being Morini. Meanwhile, manager Trapattoni closed his third season in the club with a disappointing third place in the league with the only positive result coming on 25 March 1979 by defeating local rivals Torino after having not beaten their city rivals for five straight years. The squad was eliminated in the first round of the European Cup by Glasgow Rangers, after losing 2–0 at Hampden Park

The club closed the season clinching its sixth Coppa Italia ever after winning the Final against Palermo F.C. in Naples, thereby qualifying for the 1979-80 UEFA Cup Winners' Cup.

== Squad ==
Note: Flags indicate national team as defined under FIFA eligibility rules; some limited exceptions apply. Players may hold more than one non-FIFA nationality.

Pos.	Nation	Player
GK	ITA	Giancarlo Alessandrelli
GK	ITA	Dino Zoff
DF	ITA	Sergio Brio
DF	ITA	Antonio Cabrini
DF	ITA	Claudio Gentile
DF	ITA	Francesco Morini
DF	ITA	Gaetano Scirea
MF	ITA	Romeo Benetti
MF	ITA	Franco Causio

Pos.	Nation	Player
MF	ITA	Antonello Cuccureddu
MF	ITA	Pietro Fanna
MF	ITA	Giuseppe Furino (Captain)
MF	ITA	Marco Tardelli
MF	ITA	Vinicio Verza
FW	ITA	Roberto Bettega
FW	ITA	Roberto Boninsegna
FW	ITA	Pietro Paolo Virdis

=== Transfers ===
In
Pos.	Name	from	Type
DF	Sergio Brio	Pistoiese	loan ended

Out
Pos.	Name	To	Type
DF	Luciano Spinosi	A.S. Roma	
MF	Gian Piero Gasperini	Palermo FBC	

== Competitions ==
=== Serie A ===
==== League table ====
Pos	Team	Pld	W	D	L	GF	GA	GD	Pts	Qualification or relegation
1	Milan (C)	30	17	10	3	46	19	+27	44	Qualification to European Cup
2	Perugia	30	11	19	0	34	16	+18	41	Qualification to UEFA Cup
3	Juventus	30	12	13	5	40	23	+17	37	Qualification to Cup Winners' Cup
4	Internazionale	30	10	16	4	38	24	+14	36	Qualification to UEFA Cup
5	Torino	30	11	14	5	35	23	+12	36	Qualification to UEFA Cup

Source: Panini
(C) Champions

==== Results by round ====
Round	1	2	3	4	5	6	7	8	9	10	11	12	13	14	15	16	17	18	19	20	21	22	23	24	25	26	27	28	29	30
Ground	H	A	H	A	H	A	H	A	H	A	A	H	H	A	H	A	H	A	H	A	H	A	H	A	H	H	A	A	H	A
Result	D	W	D	L	D	W	D	D	W	W	D	L	W	L	D	W	W	W	D	D	D	W	W	L	W	L	W	D	D	D
Position	5	2	4	7	8	5	4	6	4	3	3	5	3	5	5	5	5	5	5	5	5	4	3	5	4	5	4	4	3	3

Source: Competitive matches
A = Away; H = Home; W = Win; D = Draw; L = Loss; P = Postponed; = Leader, 1979–80 European Cup; = 1979–80 UEFA Cup; = 1979-80 Serie B; R = 1979-80 UEFA Cup Winners' Cup

==== Matches ====
1 October 1978 1	S.S. Lazio	2–2	Juventus	Rome
15:00 CET	Giordano 24' (rig); Garlaschelli 49'		2', 51' Bettega	Stadium: Stadio Olimpico; Referee: Agnolin

8 October 1978 2	Juventus	6–2	Hellas Verona	Turin
15:00 CET	Virdis 14', 59'; Bettega 32', 47'; Causio 49'; Benetti 54'		7', 90' (pen.) Calloni	Stadium: Comunale; Referee: Ruggero Mascia

15 October 1978 3	Catanzaro	0–0	Juventus	Catanzaro
15:00 CET				Stadium: Stadio Nicola Ceravolo; Referee: Gianfranco Menegali

22 October 1978 4	Juventus	1–2	Perugia Calcio	Turin
14:30 CET	Cuccureddu 65'		16' Speggiorin; 77' Vannini	Stadium: Comunale; Referee: Enzo Barbaresco

29 October 1978 5	Bologna	0–0	Juventus	Bologna
14:30 CET		Report		Stadium: Stadio Comunale; Referee: Longhi

5 November 1978 6	Juventus	1–0	A.C. Milan	Turin
14:30 CET	Bettega 2'			Stadium: Comunale; Referee: Pietro D'Elia

12 November 1978 7	S.S.C. Napoli	0–0	Juventus	Naples
14:30 CET				Stadium: San Paolo; Referee: Gianfranco Menegali

19 November 1978 8	Juventus	1–1	Torino	Turin
14:30 CET	Scirea 81'		37' Graziani	Stadium: Comunale; Referee: Luigi Agnolin

26 November 1978 9	Juventus	1–0	Ascoli Calcio	Turin
14:30 CET	Boninsegna 28'			Stadium: Comunale; Referee: Paolo Milan

3 December 1978 10	Atalanta B.C.	0–1	Juventus	Bergamo
14:30 CET			18' Tardelli	Stadium: Stadio Comunale; Referee: Michelotti

10 December 1978 11	Juventus	1–1	Inter	Turin
14:30 CET	Boninsegna 37'	Report	7' Baresi	Stadium: Comunale; Referee: Pieri

17 December 1978 12	A.S. Roma	1–0	Juventus	Rome
14:30 CET	Di Bartolomei 36'			Stadium: Olimpico; Referee: Paolo Bergamo

7 January 1979 13	Fiorentina	0–1	Juventus	Florence
14:30 CET			59' Scirea	Stadium: Comunale; Referee: Riccardo Lattanzi

14 January 1979 14	Juventus	1–2	Vicenza Calcio	Turin
14:30 CET	Tardelli 53'		30' Marangon; 81' Rossi	Stadium: Comunale; Referee: Ferdinando Reggiani

21 January 1979 15	Avellino	0–0	Juventus	Avellino
14:30 CET				Stadium: Partenio; Referee: Paolo Milan

28 January 1979 16	Juventus	2–1	S.S. Lazio	Turin
14:30 CET	Martini 44' (o.g.); Pighin 87' (o.g.)		59' Giordano	Stadium: Comunale; Referee: Paolo Casarin

4 February 1979 17	Hellas Verona	0–3	Juventus	Verona
15:00 CET			63' Virdis; 73' Bettega; 77' Verza	Stadium: Marcantonio Bentegodi; Referee: Giancarlo Redini

11 February 1979 18	Juventus	3–1	Catanzaro	Turin
15:00 CET	Bettega 8'; Tardelli 52'; Cabrini 61'		79' Zanini	Stadium: Comunale; Referee: Luigi Agnolin

18 February 1979 19	Perugia	0–0	Juventus	Perugia
15:00 CET				Stadium: Renato Curi; Referee: Gianfranco Menegali

4 March 1979 20	Juventus	1–1	Bologna F.C.	Turin
15:00 CET	Verza 45+2'		65' Castronaro	Stadium: Comunale; Referee: Enzo Barbaresco

11 March 1979 21	A.C. Milan	0–0	Juventus	Milan
15:00 CET				Stadium: San Siro; Referee: Alberto Michelotti

18 March 1979 22	Juventus	1–0	S.S.C. Napoli	Turin
15:00 CET	Tardelli 49'			Stadium: Comunale; Referee: Maurizio Mattei

25 March 1979 23	Torino	0–1	Juventus	Turin
15:00 CET			88' Cabrini	Stadium: Comunale; Referee: Paolo Casarin

1 April 1979 24	Ascoli Calcio	1–0	Juventus	Ascoli Piceno
15:30 CET	Bettega 22' (o.g.)			Stadium: Cino e Lillo Del Duca; Referee: Claudio Pieri

8 April 1979 25	Juventus	3–0	Atalanta B.C.	Turin
15:30 CET	Virdis 2', 30', 60'			Stadium: Comunale; Referee: Gino Menicucci

14 April 1979 26	Inter	2–1	Juventus	Milan
15:30 CET	Baresi 55'; Beccalossi 58'		15' Cuccureddu	Stadium: San Siro; Referee: Enzo Barbaresco

22 April 1979 27	Juventus	4–1	A.S. Roma	Turin
15:30 CET	Bettega 6'; Fanna 69', 79'; Benetti 89'		59' Pruzzo	Stadium: Comunale; Referee: Maurizio Mattei

29 April 1979 28	Juventus	1–1	Fiorentina	Turin
15:30 CET	Verza 23'		62' Pagliari	Stadium: Comunale; Referee: Roberto Terpin

6 May 1979 29	Vicenza Calcio	1–1	Juventus	Vicenza
16:00 CET	Zanone 66'		4' Benetti	Stadium: Romeo Menti; Referee: Claudio Pieri

13 May 1979 30	Juventus	3–3	Avellino	Turin
16:00 CET	Bettega 54'; Verza 55', 65'		71', 77' De Ponti; 86' Massa	Stadium: Comunale; Referee: Paolo Bergamo

=== Coppa Italia ===
==== Group stage ====
Pos	Team	Pld	W	D	L	GF	GA	GD	Pts
1	Juventus	4	3	1	0	6	1	+5	7
2	Fiorentina	4	1	3	0	4	3	+1	5
3	Monza	4	2	0	2	5	4	+1	4
4	Nocerina	4	0	2	2	1	4	−3	2
5	Taranto	4	0	2	2	1	5	−4	2

===== Matches =====
30 August 1978 2	Juventus	2–0	Taranto	Turin
20:30 CEST	Cuccureddu 7'; Virdis 17'			Stadium: Comunale; Referee: Giancarlo Lapi

3 September 1978 3	Fiorentina	0–0	Juventus	Florence
20:45 CEST				Stadium: Comunale; Referee: Massimo Ciulli

7 September 1978 4	A.C. Monza	0–1	Juventus	Milan
20:30 CEST			70' Virdis	Stadium: San Siro; Referee: Enzo Barbaresco
Note: Played in Milan due to the Gran Premio d'Italia of Formula 1 at Monza; cfr.

17 September 1978 5	Juventus	3–1	A.S.G. Nocerina	Turin
20:30 CEST	Bettega 12'; Tardelli 54'; Benetti 85'	Report	10' Garlini	Stadium: Comunale; Referee: Vittorio Benedetti

==== Quarterfinals ====
25 April 1979 1	Juventus	3–1	Inter	Turin
19:00 CET	Tardelli 29'; Brio 51'; Causio 89'	Report	69' (pen.) Altobelli	Stadium: Comunale; Attendance: 41,705; Referee: Pietro D'Elia

9 May 1979 2	Inter	1–0	Juventus	Milan
20:45 CET	Beccalossi 70'	Report		Stadium: San Siro; Attendance: 45,123; Referee: Vittorio Benedetti
Note: Other match sources report the score at minute 70 as own goal by Furino.

==== Semifinals ====
20 May 1979 1	Catanzaro	1–1	Juventus	Catanzaro
16:30 CET	Gentile 62' (o.g.)	Report	16' Bettega	Stadium: Comunale; Attendance: 15,088; Referee: Luigi Agnolin

31 May 1979 2	Juventus	4–2	Catanzaro	Turin
20:30 CEST	Cabrini 55' (pen.); Tardelli 69'; Causio 80'; Virdis 87'	Report	71' Sabadini; 84' Groppi	Stadium: Comunale; Attendance: 28,057; Referee: Gino Menicucci

==== Final ====
20 June 1979	Juventus	2–1	Palermo F.C.	Naples
20:30 CEST	Brio 84'; Causio 117'	Report	2' Chimenti	Stadium: San Paolo; Attendance: ca 35,000; Referee: Enzo Barbaresco

=== European Cup ===
==== First round ====
13 September 1978 1	Juventus (Italy)	1–0	(Scotland) Glasgow Rangers	Turin
20:30 CET	Virdis 9'	Report		Stadium: Comunale; Attendance: 61,425; Referee: (Romania) Rainea

27 September 1978	Glasgow Rangers (Scotland)	2–0 (2–1 agg.)	(Italy) Juventus	Glasgow
20:30 CET	MacDonald 19'; Smith 72'	Report		Stadium: Ibrox Park; Attendance: ca 44,000; Referee: (West Germany) Eschweiler

== Statistics ==
=== Squad statistics ===
Competition	Points	Home						Away						Total						GD
Competition	Points	G	W	D	L	Gs	Ga	G	W	D	L	Gs	Ga	G	W	D	L	Gs	Ga	GD
Serie A	37	15	8	5	2	30	16	15	4	8	3	10	7	30	12	13	5	40	23	+ 17
Coppa	–	4	4	0	0	12	4	5	2	2	1	4	3	9	6	2	1	16	7	+ 9
European Cup	–	1	1	0	0	1	0	1	0	0	1	0	2	2	1	0	1	1	2	– 1
Total	–	20	13	5	2	43	20	21	6	10	5	14	12	41	19	15	7	57	32	25

==== Players statistics ====
No.	Pos	Nat	Player	Total		Serie A		Coppa Italia		European Cup	
No.	Pos	Nat	Player	Apps	Goals	Apps	Goals	Apps	Goals	Apps	Goals
	GK	(Italy) ITA	Zoff	41	-29	30	-20	9	-7	2	-2
	DF	(Italy) ITA	Gentile	38	0	30	0	7	0	1	0
	DF	(Italy) ITA	Scirea	41	2	30	2	9	0	2	0
	DF	(Italy) ITA	Cuccureddu	36	3	27	2	7	1	2	0
	DF	(Italy) ITA	Cabrini	32	3	18+3	2	9	1	2	0
	MF	(Italy) ITA	Causio	41	4	30	1	9	3	2	0
	MF	(Italy) ITA	Furino	33	0	19+3	0	9	0	2	0
	MF	(Italy) ITA	Tardelli	40	7	29	4	9	3	2	0
	MF	(Italy) ITA	Benetti	37	4	23+3	3	9	1	2	0
	FW	(Italy) ITA	Bettega	41	11	30	9	9	2	2	0
	FW	(Italy) ITA	Virdis	32	10	20+3	6	7	3	2	1
	GK	(Italy) ITA	Alessandrelli	1	-3	0+1	-3	0	0	0	0
	DF	(Italy) ITA	Morini	22	0	15	0	5	0	2	0
	MF	(Italy) ITA	Verza	14	5	8+3	5	3	0	0	0
	DF	(Italy) ITA	Brio	13	2	8	0	5	2	0	0
	FW	(Italy) ITA	Boninsegna	9	2	7+1	2	1	0	0	0
	MF	(Italy) ITA	Fanna	24	2	6+10	2	6	0	2	0
	GK	(Italy) ITA	Marchese	0	0	0	0				

- Source: http://calcio-seriea.net/presenze/1978/807/

== See also ==
Blocco-Juve
