= 1980–81 Juventus FC season =

Italian football club season

Juventus
1980–81 season
- Chairman: Giampiero Boniperti
- Manager: Giovanni Trapattoni
- Stadium: Comunale
- Serie A: 1st (in European Cup)
- Coppa Italia: Semi-finals
- UEFA Cup: Second round
- Top goalscorer: Liam Brady (8 goals)
- Average home league attendance: 33,929
Home colours	Away colours

The 1980–81 season was Juventus Football Club's 83rd in existence and 79th consecutive season in the top flight of Italian football.

In July 1980, after fourteen years of a transfer ban of foreigners, Irish midfielder Liam Brady transferred from Arsenal to Juventus and helped Juventus finish the season as Serie A champions. They also participated in UEFA Cup, being defeated at home in second round.

== Squad ==
Note: Flags indicate national team as defined under FIFA eligibility rules; some limited exceptions apply. Players may hold more than one non-FIFA nationality.

Pos.	Nation	Player
GK	ITA	Dino Zoff
GK	ITA	Luciano Bodini
DF	ITA	Gaetano Scirea
DF	ITA	Antonio Cabrini
DF	ITA	Claudio Gentile
DF	ITA	Carlo Osti
DF	ITA	Sergio Brio
DF	ITA	Massimo Storgato
MF	ITA	Pietro Fanna
MF	ITA	Antonello Cuccureddu

Pos.	Nation	Player
MF	IRL	Liam Brady
MF	ITA	Franco Causio
MF	ITA	Giuseppe Furino (captain)
MF	ITA	Domenico Marocchino
MF	ITA	Claudio Cesare Prandelli
MF	ITA	Marco Tardelli
MF	ITA	Vinicio Verza
FW	ITA	Roberto Bettega
FW	ITA	Giuseppe Galderisi

=== Transfers ===
In
Pos.	Name	from	Type
MF	Liam Brady	Arsenal FC	
DF	Carlo Osti	Udinese	
DF	Massimo Storgato	Atalanta BC	loan ended
FW	Giuseppe Galderisi		

Out
Pos.	Name	To	Type
DF	Francesco Morini		retired
FW	Pietro Paolo Virdis	Cagliari	loan
MF	Roberto Tavola	Cagliari	loan
GK	Maurizio Baratella		

== Competitions ==
=== Serie A ===
==== League table ====
Pos	Team	Pld	W	D	L	GF	GA	GD	Pts	Qualification or relegation
1	Juventus (C)	30	17	10	3	46	15	+31	44	Qualification to European Cup
2	Roma	30	14	14	2	43	20	+23	42	Qualification to Cup Winners' Cup
3	Napoli	30	14	10	6	31	21	+10	38	Qualification to UEFA Cup
4	Internazionale	30	14	8	8	41	24	+17	36	Qualification to UEFA Cup
5	Fiorentina	30	9	14	7	28	25	+3	32	

Source: Panini
(C) Champions

==== Results by round ====
Round	1	2	3	4	5	6	7	8	9	10	11	12	13	14	15	16	17	18	19	20	21	22	23	24	25	26	27	28	29	30
Ground	H	A	H	A	H	A	H	A	H	A	A	H	H	A	H	A	H	A	H	A	H	A	H	A	H	H	A	A	H	A
Result	D	W	D	L	D	L	D	W	D	W	W	D	D	D	W	D	W	W	W	W	W	W	L	W	W	W	W	D	W	W
Position	5	4	3	5	5	8	9	6	5	3	2	3	3	3	3	3	3	3	2	1	1	1	2	2	1	1	1	1	1	1

Source: Competitive matches
A = Away; H = Home; W = Win; D = Draw; L = Loss; P = Postponed; = Leader, 1981–82 European Cup; = 1981–82 UEFA Cup; = 1981-82 Serie B; R = 1981-82 UEFA Cup Winners' Cup

==== Matches ====
14 September 1980 1	Cagliari	1–1	Juventus	Cagliari
16:00	Selvaggi 19'	Report	40' Tardelli	Stadium: Stadio Sant'Elia; Referee: Pieri

21 September 1980 2	Juventus	2–0	Como 1907	Turin
16:00	Lombardi 20' (aut); Cabrini 35' (rig)	Report		Stadium: Comunale; Referee: Patrussi

28 September 1980 3	Brescia	1–1	Juventus	Brescia
15:00	Penzo 11'	Report	24' (pen.) Cabrini	Stadium: Stadio Mario Rigamonti; Referee: Barbaresco

5 October 1980 4	Juventus	0–1	Bologna	Turin
15:00		Report	83' (pen.) Paris	Stadium: Comunale; Referee: Mattei

19 October 1980 5	Ascoli	0–0	Juventus	Ascoli Piceno
14:30		Report		Stadium: Stadio Cino e Lillo Del Duca; Referee: D'Elia

26 October 1980 6	Juventus	1–2	Torino	Turin
	Causio 18'	Report	60', 83' Graziani	Stadium: Comunale; Referee: Agnolin

9 November 1980 7	Perugia	0–0	Juventus	Perugia
		Report

23 November 1980 8	Juventus	2–1	Inter	Turin
	50' (pen.) Liam Brady; 69'Scirea	Report	79'Ambu	Stadium: Comunale

30 November 1980 9	Catanzaro	0–0	Juventus	Catanzaro
		Report

14 December 1980 10	Juventus	4–1	Pistoiese	Turin
	18' Fanna; 33' Fanna; 41' Scirea; 80' (pen.) Bettega	Report	50'Chimenti	Stadium: Comunale

21 December 1980 11	Juventus	4–0	Udinese	Turin
	11' Brady; 45' Causio; 56' (pen.) Bettega; 83' Marocchino	Report		Stadium: Comunale

28 December 1980 12	Avellino	1–1	Juventus	Naples
	85'Piga Mario	Report	31'Fanna	Stadium: Stadio San Paolo

18 January 1981 13	Roma	0–0	Juventus	Rome
		Report		Stadium: Stadio Olimpico

25 January 1981 14	Juventus	1–1	Napoli	Turin
	58' Tardelli	Report	2' Pellegrini C.	Stadium: Comunale

1 February 1981 15	Fiorentina	0–1	Juventus	Florence
		Report	59' Tardelli	Stadium: Comunale

8 February 1981 16	Juventus	1–1	Cagliari	Turin
	77' Scirea	Report	42' Virdis	Stadium: Comunale

15 February 1981 17	Como 1907	1–2	Juventus	Lombardy
	69' (pen.) Nicoletti	Report	32' Bettega; 36' Tardelli	Stadium: Comunale

22 February 1981 18	Juventus	2–0	Brescia	Turin
	7' Tardelli; 45' Marocchino	Report		Stadium: Comunale

1 March 1981 19	Bologna	1–5	Juventus	Bologna
	88' (pen.)Fiorini	Report	15' Bettega; 24' Brady; 42' Brady; 59' Cabrini; 70' Fanna	Stadium: Stadio Renato dell'Ara

8 March 1981 20	Juventus	3–0	Ascoli	Turin
	7' Bettega; 34' Fanna; 83' Cabrini	Report		Stadium: Comunale

15 March 1981 21	Torino	0–2	Juventus	Turin
		Report	43' Brady; 87' Cabrini	Stadium: Comunale

22 March 1981 22	Juventus	2–1	Perugia	Turin
	85' (pen.) Brady; 89' Marocchino	Report	81' De Rosa G.	Stadium: Comunale

29 March 1981 23	Inter	1–0	Juventus	Milan
	61' Muraro C.	Report		Stadium: Giuseppe Meazza

5 April 1981 24	Juventus	3–0	Catanzaro	Turin
	15' Marocchino; 82' Brady; 90' Scirea	Report		Stadium: Comunale

12 April 1981 25	Pistoiese	1–3	Juventus	Tuscany
	83' Chimenti	Report	14' Cuccureddu; 71' Brady; 81' Tardelli	Stadium: Comunale

26 April 1981 26	Udinese	0–2	Juventus	Udine
		Report	34' Marocchino; 43' Tardelli	Stadium: Comunale

3 May 1981 27	Juventus	1–0	Avellino	Turin
	81' Cabrini	Report		Stadium: Comunale

10 May 1981 28	Juventus	0–0	Roma	Turin
		Report		Stadium: Comunale

17 May 1981 29	Napoli	0–1	Juventus	Naples
		Report	64' (o.g.) Guidetti	Stadium: Comunale

24 May 1981 30	Juventus	1–0	Fiorentina	Turin
	26' Cabrini	Report		Stadium: Comunale

=== Coppa Italia ===
==== First round ====
Pos	Team	Pld	W	D	L	GF	GA	GD	Pts
1	Juventus	4	3	1	0	8	3	+5	7
2	Udinese	4	1	3	0	5	3	+2	5
3	Genoa	4	0	3	1	2	4	−2	3
4	Taranto	4	1	1	2	2	4	−2	2 (Note: 1 point deducted?)
5	Brescia	4	0	2	2	2	5	−3	2

Notes:

20 August 1980 1	Udinese	2–2	Juventus	Udine
	Tesser 52'; Pradella 59'		Bettega 75', 78'	Stadium: Stadio Friuli; Referee: Longhi

24 August 1980 2	Juventus	2–0	Taranto	Turin
	40', 63' Fanna			Referee: Tonolini

31 August 1980 3	Brescia	0–1	Juventus	Stadio Mario Rigamonti
			88' Cabrini	Referee: D'Elia

7 September 1980 5	Juventus	3–1	Genoa	Turin
	52' (pen.) Cabrini; 64' Fanna; 82' Prandelli		65' Russo	Referee: Terpin

==== Quarter-finals ====
4 March 1981 1	Avellino	1–3	Juventus	Avellino
	Zoff 28' (o.g.)		Verza 52'; Causio 75'; Bettega 85'	Stadium: Partenio - Adriano Lombardi

25 March 1981 2	Juventus	3–2	Avellino	Turin
				Stadium: Comunale; Referee: Tonolini

==== Semi-finals ====
28 May 1981	Juventus	0–1	Roma	Turin
				Stadium: Comunale

25 March 1981 2	Roma	1–1	Juventus	Rome
				Stadium: Stadio Olimpico

=== UEFA Cup ===
==== First round ====
17 September 1980	Juventus (Italy)	4–0	(Greece) Panathinaikos	Stadio Delle Alpi, Turin
	Scirea 5'; Verza 18'; Bettega 38'; Cabrini 42' (pen.)			Referee: Walter Eschweiler (West Germany)

1 October 1980	Panathinaikos (Greece)	4–2	(Italy) Juventus	OAKA Spiros Louis, Athens
	Gentile 31' (o.g.); Andreuchi 37'; Livathinos 68'; Delikaris 87'		Bettega 40'; Fanna 81'	Referee: Charles Corver (Netherlands)

==== Second round ====
22 October 1980	Widzew Łódź (Poland)	3–1	(Italy) Juventus	Łódź
	Grębosz 30'; Pięta 69'; Smolarek 79'		Bettega 42'	Stadium: Stadion Widzewa; Referee: (Austria) Horst Brummeier

5 November 1980	Juventus (Italy)	3–1 (a.e.t.) (1–4 p)	(Poland) Widzew Łódź	Turin
	Tardelli 37'; Furino 46'; Brady 60'		Pięta 59'	Stadium: Stadio Delle Alpi; Referee: (Turkey) Talat Tokat
	Penalties
	Causio (penalty missed); Cabrini (penalty missed); Brady (penalty scored)		(penalty scored) Tłokiński; (penalty scored) Grębosz; (penalty scored) Smolarek; (penalty scored) Boniek

== Statistics ==
=== Players statistics ===
No.	Pos	Nat	Player	Total		Serie A		Coppa		UEFA	
No.	Pos	Nat	Player	Apps	Goals	Apps	Goals	Apps	Goals	Apps	Goals
	GK	(Italy) ITA	Zoff	42	-31	30	-15	8	-8	4	-8
	DF	(Italy) ITA	Gentile	37	0	27	0	6	0	4	0
	DF	(Italy) ITA	Cuccureddu	35	1	29	1	2	0	4	0
	DF	(Italy) ITA	Scirea	41	5	29	4	8	0	4	1
	DF	(Italy) ITA	Cabrini	38	11	28	7	8	3	2	1
	MF	(Italy) ITA	Tardelli	37	8	28	7	6	0	3	1
	MF	(Italy) ITA	Causio	34	3	19+6	2	6	1	3	0
	MF	(Italy) ITA	Furino	33	1	24	0	5	0	4	1
	MF	(Italy) ITA	Fanna	40	9	29	5	7	3	4	1
	MF	(Republic of Ireland) IRL	Brady	39	9	28	8	7	0	4	1
	FW	(Italy) ITA	Bettega	37	10	25	5	8	2	4	3
	GK	(Italy) ITA	Bodini	0	0	0	0	0	0	0	0
	MF	(Italy) ITA	Marocchino	30	5	16+8	5	6	0		
	MF	(Italy) ITA	Prandelli	29	1	10+10	0	5	1	4	0
	DF	(Italy) ITA	Osti	12	0	4+2	0	5	0	1	0
	MF	(Italy) ITA	Verza	24	3	2+12	0	6	2	4	1
	DF	(Italy) ITA	Brio	8	0	1+3	0	4	0		
	DF	(Italy) ITA	Storgato	4	0	1	0	2	0	1	0
	FW	(Italy) ITA	Galderisi	2	0	0+1	0	1	0		
	GK	(Italy) ITA	Carraro	0	0	0	0				
	MF	(Italy) ITA	Pin	0	0	0	0				

- Source: http://calcio-seriea.net/presenze/1980/839/
