= Maurizio Simonato =

Italian footballer

Personal information
- Full name: Maurizio Simonato
- Date of birth: 21 September 1947 (age 79)
- Place of birth: Crespano del Grappa, Italy
- Height: 1.72 m (5 ft 8 in)
- Position: Forward

Senior career*
Years	Team	Apps	(Gls)
1965–1971	Treviso	120	(28)
1971–1972	Massese	36	(10)
1972–1977	Sambenedettese	155	(39)
1977	Avellino	0	(0)
1977–1980	Teramo	81	(22)
Total		392	(99)

Managerial career
- 1981–1982: Monselice
- 1982–1985: Montebelluna
- 1985–1987: Pergocrema
- 1987–1989: Benevento
- 1989–1990: Sambenedettese
- 1993–1994: Centese
- 1995–1996: Pergocrema
- 2005–2006: Sambenedettese
- * Club domestic league appearances and goals as of 17 December 2024

Maurizio Simonato (born 21 September 1947) is an Italian former professional footballer and manager, who played as a forward.

== Playing career ==
Revealed by Treviso, Simonato stood out in particular for Sambenedettese, a team for which he played from 1972 to 1977, being Serie C champion in 1973–74.

== Managerial career ==
Simonato started as a coach in 1981, at Monselice, in Serie C2. He also managed Montebelluno, Pergocrema, Benevento and Sambenedettese. In Eccellenza, managed Monturanese and Civitanovese being promoted to Serie D.

== Honours ==
=== Player ===
Sambenedettese

- Serie C: 1973–74 (group B)
