= 1978–79 Coppa Italia =

Tournament details
- Country: Italy
- Dates: 27 Aug 1978 – 17 May 1979
- Teams: 36

Final positions
- Champions: Juventus (6th title)
- Runners-up: Palermo

Tournament statistics
- Matches played: 83
- Goals scored: 190 (2.29 per match)
- Top goal scorer: Massimo Palanca (8 goals)

The 1978–79 Coppa Italia was the 32nd coppa Italia. Round-robin, Juventus won 2-1 against Palermo to achieve 6 coppa Italia.

== Group stage ==
=== Group 1 ===
Pos	Team	Pld	W	D	L	GF	GA	GD	Pts
1	Juventus	4	3	1	0	6	1	+5	7
2	Fiorentina	4	1	3	0	4	3	+1	5
3	Monza	4	2	0	2	5	4	+1	4
4	Nocerina	4	0	2	2	1	4	−3	2
5	Taranto	4	0	2	2	1	5	−4	2

=== Group 2 ===
Pos	Team	Pld	W	D	L	GF	GA	GD	Pts
1	Lazio	4	2	2	0	3	1	+2	6
2	Vicenza	4	2	1	1	4	3	+1	5
3	Bari	4	2	0	2	3	2	+1	4
4	Bologna	4	0	3	1	2	3	−1	3
5	Pistoiese	4	0	2	2	1	4	−3	2

=== Group 3 ===
Pos	Team	Pld	W	D	L	GF	GA	GD	Pts
1	Palermo	4	3	1	0	8	4	+4	7
2	Torino	4	2	0	2	8	8	0	4
3	Cesena	4	1	1	2	7	8	−1	3
4	Brescia	4	1	1	2	6	7	−1	3
5	Hellas Verona	4	1	1	2	6	8	−2	3

=== Group 4 ===
Pos	Team	Pld	W	D	L	GF	GA	GD	Pts
1	Catanzaro	4	3	1	0	11	4	+7	7
2	Milan	4	2	1	1	9	7	+2	5
3	SPAL	4	2	0	2	6	6	0	4
4	Lecce	4	1	0	3	4	7	−3	2
5	Foggia	4	1	0	3	2	8	−6	2

=== Group 5 ===
Pos	Team	Pld	W	D	L	GF	GA	GD	Pts
1	Perugia	4	2	2	0	7	1	+6	6
2	Avellino	4	1	3	0	3	2	+1	5
3	Udinese	4	1	2	1	3	2	+1	4
4	Pescara	4	1	2	1	3	3	0	4
5	Sambenedettese	4	0	1	3	1	9	−8	1

=== Group 6 ===
Pos	Team	Pld	W	D	L	GF	GA	GD	Pts
1	Napoli	4	2	2	0	4	2	+2	6
2	Sampdoria	4	2	1	1	7	5	+2	5
3	Genoa	4	1	1	2	5	5	0	3
4	Rimini	4	1	1	2	7	8	−1	3
5	Atalanta	4	1	1	2	6	9	−3	3

=== Group 7 ===
Pos	Team	Pld	W	D	L	GF	GA	GD	Pts
1	Cagliari	4	2	2	0	6	3	+3	6
2	Varese	4	2	1	1	5	4	+1	5
3	Ternana	4	1	2	1	1	1	0	4
4	Roma	4	2	0	2	6	7	−1	4
5	Ascoli	4	0	1	3	2	5	−3	1

== Quarter-finals ==
Join the defending champion: Internazionale.

Team 1	Agg.	Team 2	1st leg	2nd leg
Palermo	0-0 (p: 5-4)	Lazio	0-0	0-0
Cagliari	2-3	Catanzaro	2-2	0-1
Juventus	3-2	Internazionale	3-1	0-1
Napoli	2-1	Perugia	2-1	0-0

p=after penalty shoot-out

== Semi-finals ==
Team 1	Agg.	Team 2	1st leg	2nd leg
Catanzaro	3-5	Juventus	1-1	2-4
Palermo	2-1	Napoli	0-0	2-1

== Final ==
17 May 1979
20:30

Juventus	2–1 (a.e.t.)	Palermo
Brio 83'; Causio 117'		Chimenti 1'

Stadio Olimpico, Rome
Attendance: 40,000
Referee: Enzo Barbaresco

== Top goalscorers ==
Rank	Player	Club	Goals
1	(Italy) Massimo Palanca	Catanzaro	8
2	(Italy) Carlo Bresciani	Sampdoria	5
3	(Italy) Franco Pezzato	SPAL	4
4	(Italy) Agostino Di Bartolomei	Roma	3
4	(Italy) Roberto Pruzzo	Roma	3
4	(Italy) Marco Tardelli	Juventus	3
4	(Italy) Pietro Paolo Virdis	Juventus	3
4	(Italy) Franco Causio	Juventus	3
4	(Italy) Aldo Maldera	Milan	3
4	(Italy) Paolo Pulici	Torino	3
4	(Italy) Carlo Osellame	Palermo	3
4	(Italy) Adriano Tedoldi	Rimini	3
