= Sergio Gori =

Italian footballer (1946–2023)

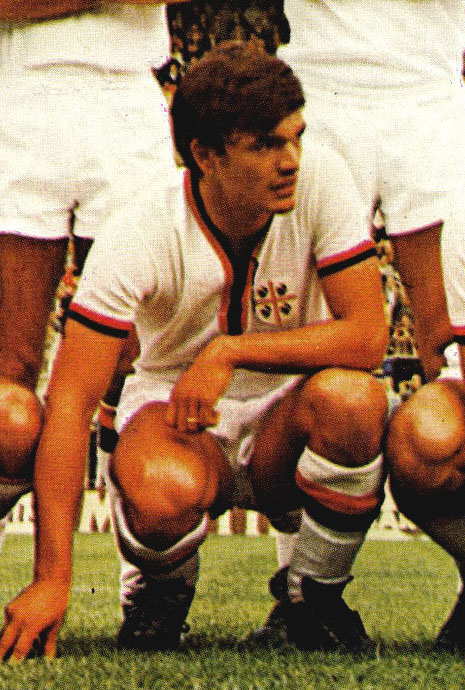
- Gori at Cagliari in 1969

Personal information
- Date of birth: 24 February 1946
- Place of birth: Milan, Kingdom of Italy
- Date of death: 5 April 2023 (aged 77)
- Place of death: Sesto San Giovanni, Italy
- Height: 1.78 m (5 ft 10 in)
- Positions: Midfielder; forward

Senior career*
Years	Team	Apps	(Gls)
1964–1966	Inter Milan	10	(2)
1966–1968	Vicenza	56	(16)
1968–1969	Inter Milan	14	(1)
1969–1975	Cagliari	166	(33)
1975–1977	Juventus	29	(7)
1977–1978	Verona	18	(3)
1978–1979	Sant'Angelo	26	(5)
Total		319	(67)

International career
1970	Italy	3	(0)
Medal record
Representing Italy
Men's Football
FIFA World Cup
Runner-up	1970 Mexico
- * Club domestic league appearances and goals

Sergio "Bobo" Gori (Italian pronunciation: [ˈsɛrdʒo ˈbɔːbo ˈɡɔːri]; 24 February 1946 – 5 April 2023) was an Italian footballer who played as a midfielder and a forward.

== Club career ==
Born in Milan, Gori debuted with Inter Milan at a very young age, making 10 caps between 1964 and 1966, during the time of the Grande Inter team of the 60s. He was sent to gain experience with Lanerossi Vicenza for two seasons, in exchange for the reigning Serie A top scorer Luis Vinicio in 1966. In 1968, he returned to Inter for a season, after notable performances with Vicenza, but he was subsequently sold to Cagliari Calcio, along with Angelo Domenghini, in exchange for Roberto Boninsegna. With Inter he won the 1964–65 and the 1965–66 Serie A titles, as well as the 1964–65 European Cup, and the 1965 Intercontinental Cup.

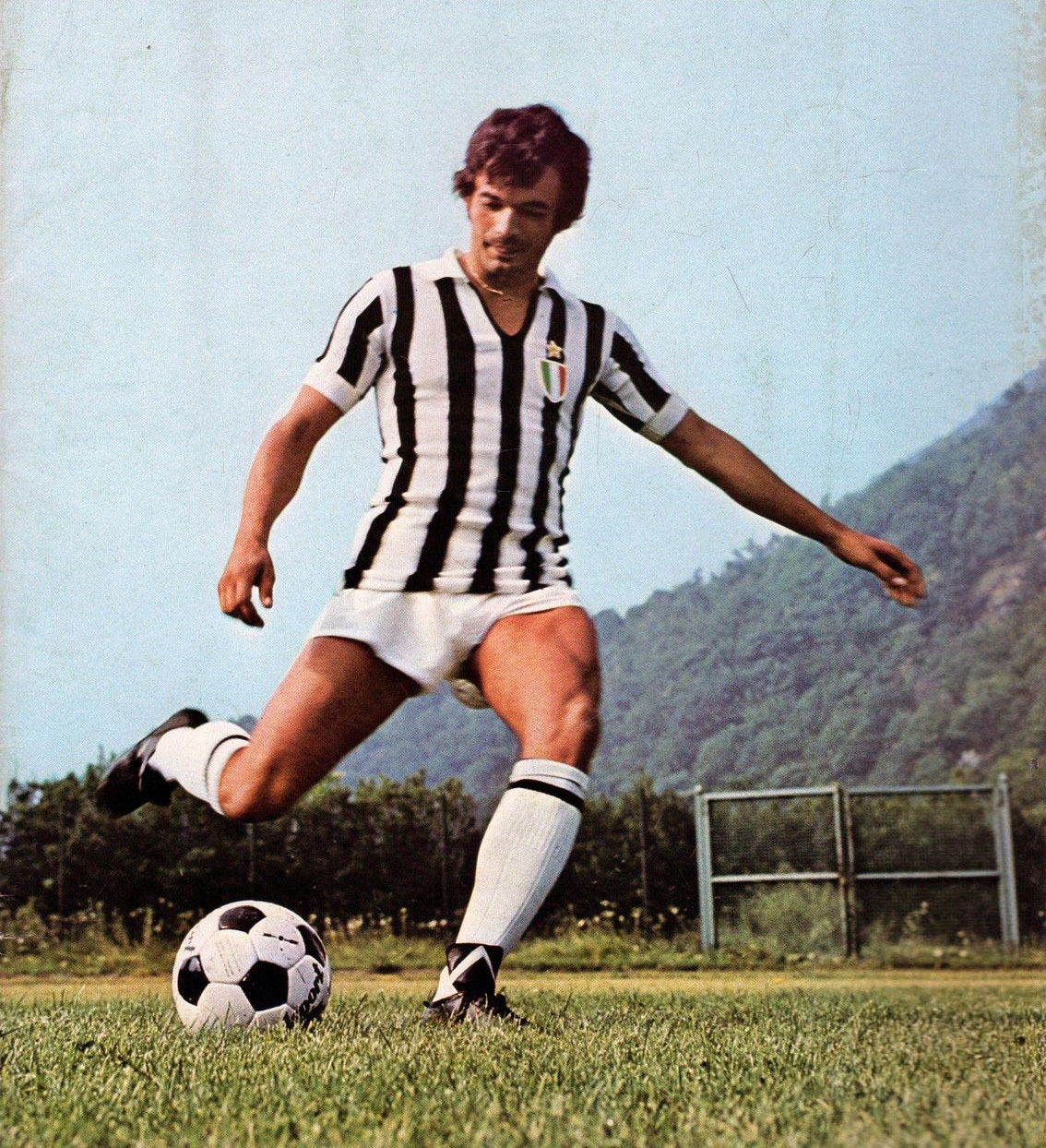
Gori in action with Juventus in 1975

During the 1969–70 Serie A season, Gori was a key member of the starting line-up of the Cagliari formation that won the first and sole scudetto (Italian title) in its history, forming an experimental attacking duo with Gigi Riva, often functioning as a supporting striker behind Riva. His performances that season earned him a call up at the 1970 World Cup with his national team.

In 1975, Gori moved to Juventus, where he spent two seasons, winning his fourth scudetto and the UEFA Cup during the 1976–77 season. He ended his Serie A career with Hellas Verona F.C. during the 1977–78 season, subsequently ending his football career in 1979 after a season with Sant'Angelo in Serie C2, helping the team to Serie C1 promotion. He is one of five footballers to win Serie A with three clubs, a feat he managed with Inter, Cagliari, and Juventus; the other four players to have managed the same feat are Giovanni Ferrari, Pietro Fanna, Aldo Serena, and Attilio Lombardo.

== International career ==
Gori made his Italy debut at the 1970 FIFA World Cup, in the quarter-final match against hosts Mexico, coming on for Domenghini; Italy went on to reach the final of the tournament. He made two more appearances for the Italy national side in 1970 following the World Cup.

== Honours ==
Inter Milan

- Serie A: 1964–65, 1965–66
- European Cup: 1964–65
- Intercontinental Cup: 1965

Cagliari

- Serie A: 1969–70

Juventus

- Serie A: 1976–77
- UEFA Cup: 1976–77

Italy

- FIFA World Cup runner-up: 1970
