= Alberto Marchetti =

Italian footballer and coach (born 1954)

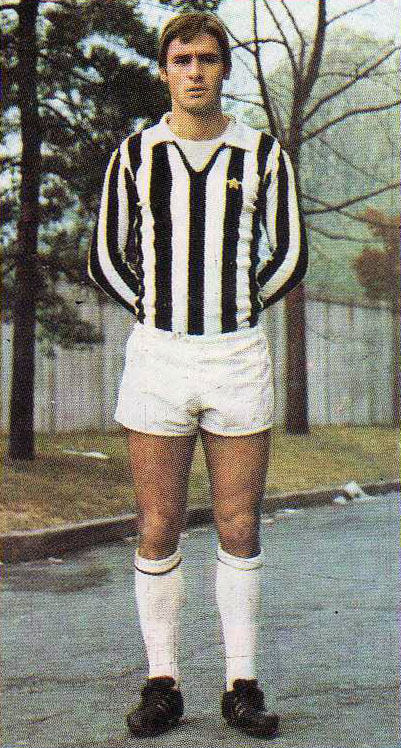
- Marchetti with Juventus in 1974

Personal information
- Date of birth: December 16, 1954 (age 71)
- Place of birth: Montevarchi, Italy
- Height: 1.80 m (5 ft 11 in)
- Position: Midfielder

Senior career*
| Years | Team | Apps | (Gls) |
| 1973–1974 | Arezzo | 17 | (1) |
| 1974–1975 | Juventus | 0 | (0) |
| 1975–1976 | Novara | 32 | (7) |
| 1976–1977 | Juventus | 6 | (0) |
| 1977–1983 | Cagliari | 185 | (19) |
| 1983–1984 | Udinese | 24 | (1) |
| 1984–1987 | Ascoli | 74 | (1) |
| 1987–1990 | Novara | 89 | (14) |

Managerial career
- 1999: Novara
- * Club domestic league appearances and goals

Alberto Marchetti (born December 16, 1954) is an Italian professional football coach and a former player who played as a central midfielder.

He began his career with Arezzo before joining Juventus, although his first-team games would be limited and he also spent a season playing with Novara in Serie B.

Marchetti joined Cagliari in 1977 and spent six seasons at the club, winning promotion to Serie A in 1979. After relegation in 1983, he would join Udinese where he partnered Zico in midfield for one season. He joined Ascoli and played for three seasons (winning promotion in 1986) before returning to Novara to finish his career.

== Honours ==
- Serie A champion: 1976/77.
- UEFA Cup winner: 1976/77.
