= Marco Tardelli =

Italian footballer

- Tardelli in 2026

Personal information
- Date of birth: 24 September 1954 (age 72)
- Place of birth: Capanne di Careggine, Italy
- Height: 1.78 m (5 ft 10 in)
- Positions: Midfielder; defender

Senior career*
Years	Team	Apps	(Gls)
1972–1974	Pisa	41	(4)
1974–1975	Como	36	(2)
1975–1985	Juventus	259	(35)
1985–1987	Inter Milan	43	(2)
1987–1988	St. Gallen	14	(0)
Total		393	(43)

International career
1976–1986	Italy	81	(6)

Managerial career
- 1988–1990: Italy U16
- 1990–1993: Italy U21 (assistant)
- 1993–1995: Como
- 1995–1996: Cesena
- 1997–2000: Italy U21
- 2000–2001: Inter Milan
- 2002–2003: Bari
- 2004: Egypt
- 2005–2008: Arezzo
- 2008–2013: Republic of Ireland (assistant)
Medal record
Men's football
Representing Italy (as player)
FIFA World Cup
Winner	1982 Spain
Representing Italy (as manager)
UEFA European Under-21 Championship
Winner	2000 Slovakia
- * Club domestic league appearances and goals

Marco Tardelli (Italian pronunciation: [ˈmarko tarˈdɛlli]; born 24 September 1954) is an Italian former football player and manager. At club level, he played as a midfielder for several Italian clubs; he began his career with Pisa, and later played for Como, Juventus, and Inter Milan, before retiring with Swiss club St. Gallen. He enjoyed a highly successful career with Juventus, winning five league titles, as well as multiple Coppa Italia titles, and four major UEFA competitions (European Cup, Cup Winner's Cup, UEFA Cup and UEFA Super Cup), becoming one of the first three players ever to win all three major UEFA club competitions, along with Italy and Juventus teammates Antonio Cabrini and Gaetano Scirea.

Tardelli also achieved success with the Italy national team. He represented his nation at three FIFA World Cups (1978, 1982 and 1986), winning the 1982 edition of the tournament. His goal celebration in the 1982 final – where he ran away shaking his fists, tears pouring down his face, screaming "Gol! Gol!" as he shook his head wildly – is regarded as one of the most iconic moments in World Cup history. He also took part in UEFA Euro 1980, in which he came fourth on home soil, and was named in the team of the tournament.

Tardelli was an energetic and hard-tackling yet technically skilful two-way midfielder, who was known for his ability to contribute both offensively and defensively. In 2004, Tardelli was named 37th in the UEFA Golden Jubilee Poll; he was inducted into the Italian Football Hall of Fame in 2015.

As a manager, Tardelli initially worked with the Italy U-16 side, and later served as an assistant manager to Cesare Maldini for the U-21 side. He subsequently led several clubs in Italy before serving as head coach of the Italy national under-21 football team, winning the 1997 Mediterranean Games and the 2000 UEFA European Under-21 Championship, before returning to coach at club level. Between 2004 and 2005 he also managed the Egypt national football team, while he served as an assistant manager to Giovanni Trapattoni with the Republic of Ireland national football team between 2008 and 2013.

== Club career ==
Tardelli was born at Capanne di Careggine, in the province of Lucca (Tuscany). He started his career in the Italian Serie C with the club of Pisa in 1972. Two years later he played in the Serie B with Como before joining Serie A giants Juventus the next year, in October 1975.

During his decade-long stint at the Turin club, he enjoyed much success, as he became one of the first three players ever to win all the three major European competitions, alongside teammates Antonio Cabrini and Gaetano Scirea: the UEFA Cup in 1977, the Cup Winners' Cup in 1984, and the European Cup in 1985. With Juventus, he also won five Italian Serie A championships, and two Coppa Italia titles, as well as the 1984 European Super Cup.

He scored the decisive goal during the first leg of the 1977 UEFA Cup final against Athletic Bilbao, which allowed him and Juventus to win their first ever European title.

In total, Tardelli played 376 games with Juventus and scored 51 goals. He left the Turin club in 1985, moving on to rivals Inter Milan, where he remained until 1987, before ending his career in 1988, after a season with Swiss side St. Gallen.

== International career ==
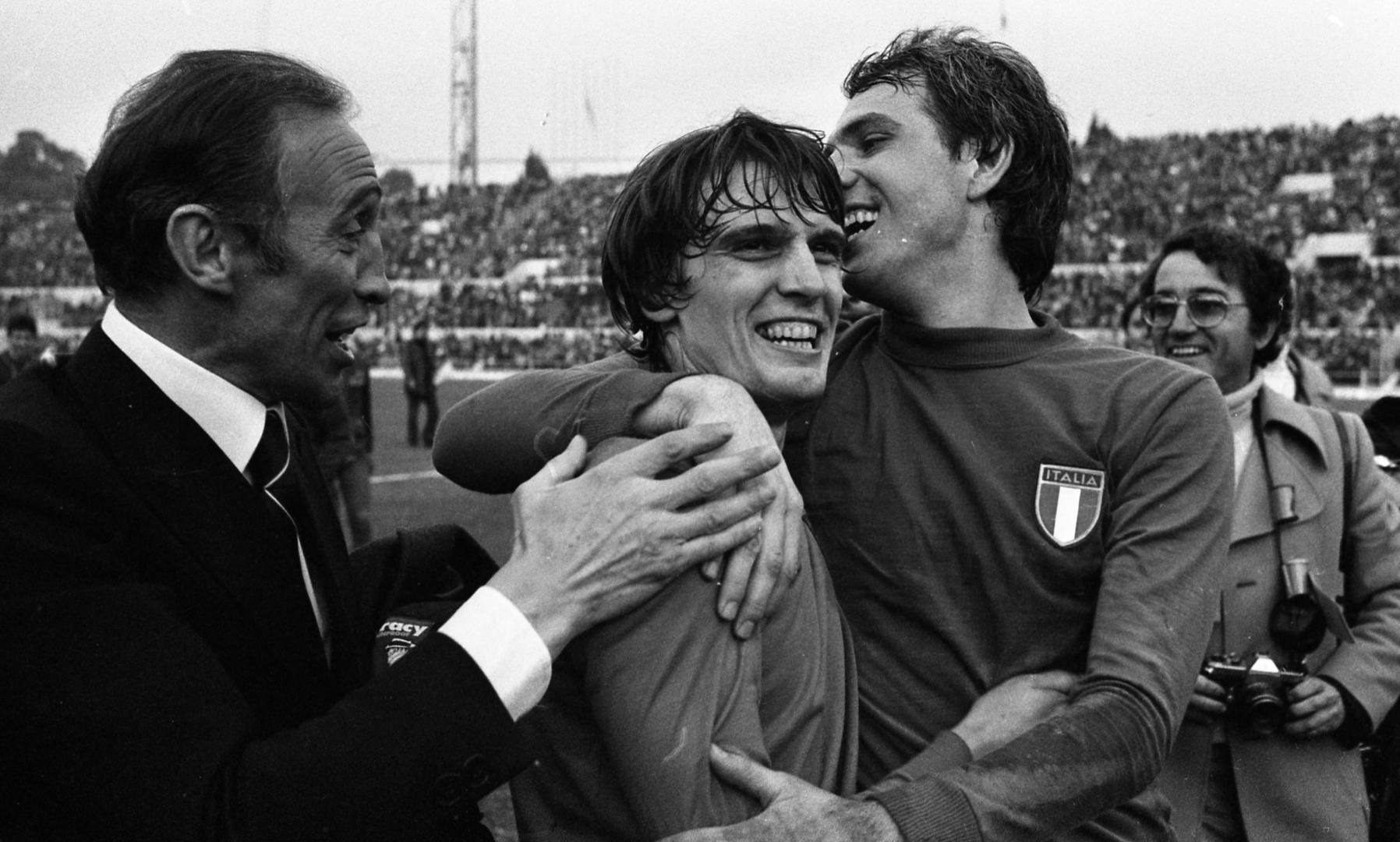
Tardelli (center) celebrates with Roberto Bettega and Enzo Bearzot, manager of the Italy national team, after a victory over England in November 1976.

Tardelli made his international debut on 7 April 1976 against Portugal. He played at the 1978 World Cup and the 1980 European Championship on home soil, reaching the semi-final and earning fourth-place finishes in both tournaments, and being named as a member of the team of the tournament at Euro 80. He performed especially well during Italy's 1982 World Cup-winning campaign, scoring twice. His first came in a second-round group stage win against Argentina, and his memorable second goal of the tournament was scored in the final against West Germany, with a left footed strike from outside the area. With tears in his eyes, he ran towards the Italian bench, fists clenched in front of his chest, screaming "Gol! Gol!" as he shook his head wildly. This celebration has been called the "Tardelli cry", and was considered one of the defining images of Italy's 1982 World Cup triumph; Tardelli later reflected:

"After I scored, my whole life passed before me – the same feeling they say you have when you are about to die, the joy of scoring in a World Cup final was immense, something I dreamed about as a kid, and my celebration was a release after realising that dream. I was born with that scream inside me, that was just the moment it came out."

In 2014, his iconic 1982 FIFA World Cup Final goal celebration was named the fourth greatest World Cup moment of all time by the BBC. He won a total of 81 caps for Italy, playing his final game for them against Norway in September 1985, and also served as Italy's captain between 1983 and 1985. He was part of the squad for 1986 FIFA World Cup, but did not play. He retired as a player in 1988.

== Style of play ==
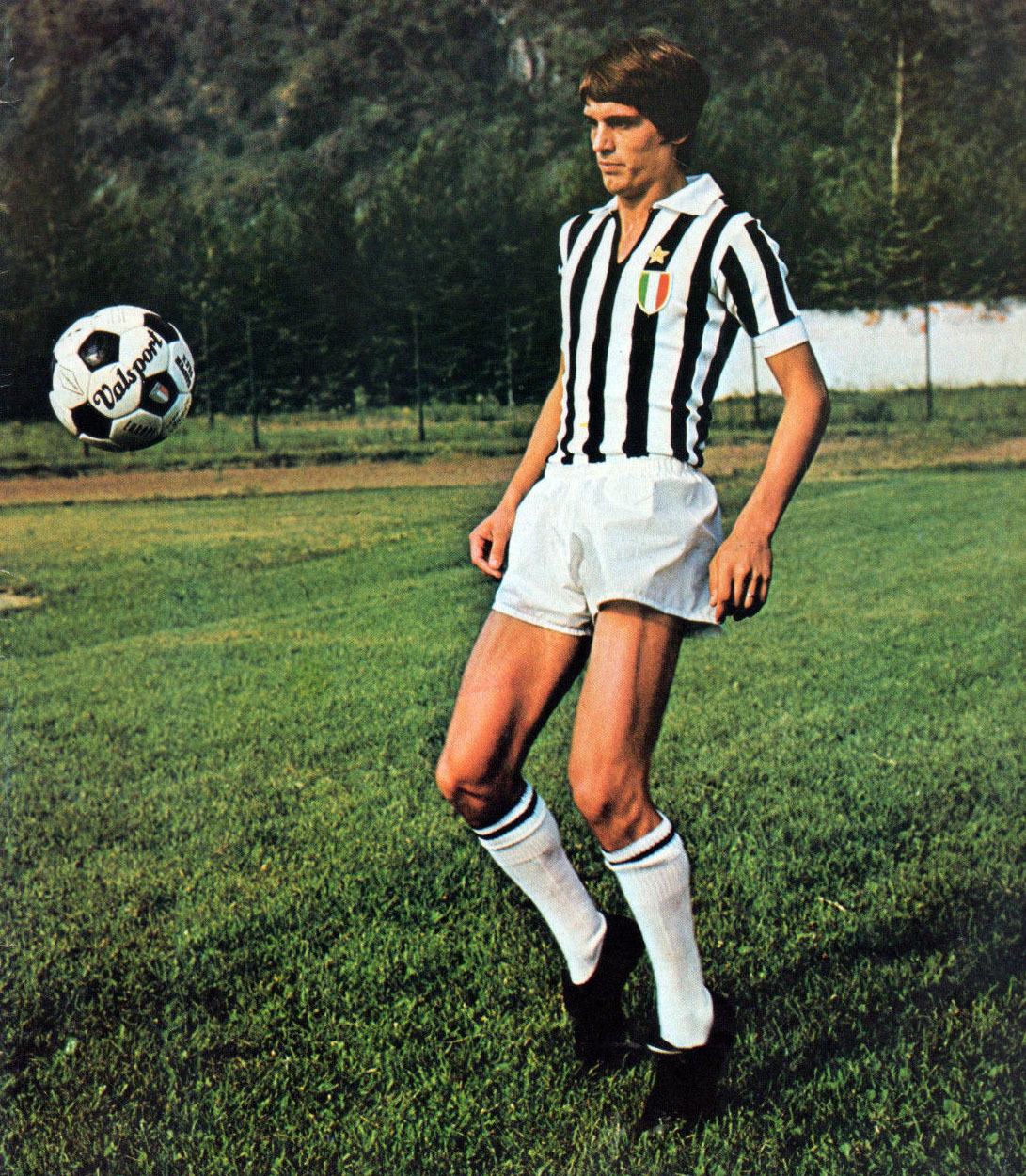
Tardelli in action with Bianconeri in the summer 1975

During an era when Italy was known for its defensive prowess (catenaccio), Tardelli made his name as a hard-tackling yet technically skilful and elegant defensive midfielder, with an ability to get forward and contribute offensively; a well-rounded footballer, he was regarded as one of the finest midfielders in the world during the early 1980s. A quick, tenacious, and energetic player, with good feet, he is regarded as one of the greatest Italian midfielders of all time, and was a two-way midfielder who was known for his tactical intelligence, versatility and work-rate as a footballer, which enabled him to play anywhere in midfield. Although he was usually deployed in the centre in a more offensive midfield role, in particular under managers Giovanni Trapattoni and Enzo Bearzot, with Juventus and Italy respectively (known in Italian as the "mezzala" position), he also played in several other positions throughout his career, and was capable of playing as a winger on either flank, or even as a defender; indeed in his early career, he played as a full-back on either side of the pitch, and also as a centre-back (or "stopper" in Italian), due to his man-marking skills and ball-winning abilities. Although Tardelli was mainly renowned for his speed, stamina and defensive skills, he also possessed a powerful shot, and was capable of striking and passing the ball with either foot, despite being naturally right footed; he refined his ability with his weaker foot in his youth as his idol Gigi Riva was left-footed. Due to his great pace and slender build, Tardelli's Juventus teammate Luciano Spinosi gave him the nickname Schizzo. In addition to his footballing abilities, he was also stood out for his leadership throughout his career, and was known for being a decisive player. In 2007, The Times placed Tardelli at number 10 in their list of the 50 hardest footballers in history. Jonathan Wilson, when writing for The Guardian in 2013, labelled Tardelli as a type of holding midfielder he described as a "destroyer," a player who is primarily tasked with running, winning back possession, and distributing the ball to other players.

== Coaching career ==
Tardelli started his managing career as head coach of the Under 16 Italy national team in 1988, immediately after his retirement. Two years later, he became the assistant coach of Cesare Maldini for the Under 21 team. In 1993, he switched to Como of Serie C1. He led Como to promotion into Serie B, but was unable to avoid relegation.

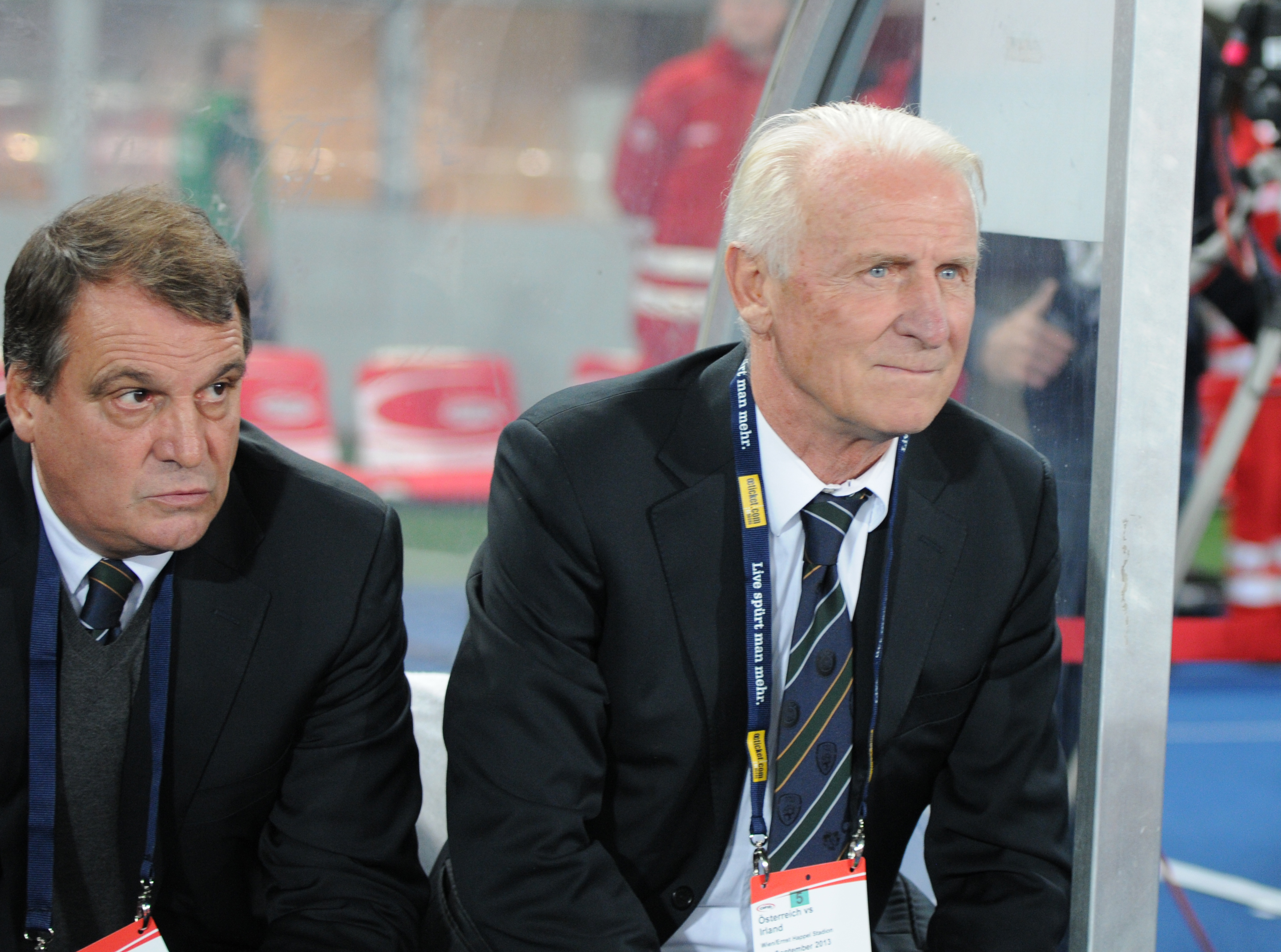
Tardelli (left) in his role as Republic of Ireland assistant manager, near Giovanni Trapattoni, in September 2013.

In 1995, he took over Cesena, another Serie B team. Tardelli would spend three seasons with Cesena before leaving to become head coach of the Italian Under 21 team. He won the Under 21 European Championship, the following year, and also coached the Italian side which took part at the 2000 Summer Olympics, reaching the quarter-finals. His success with the Italian Under 21 side led Tardelli to become the manager of Inter Milan for the 2000–01 season. His tenure with the Nerazzurri would be short; following a string of embarrassing defeats especially a 6–0 defeat to local rivals AC Milan, Tardelli was fired in June 2001. Tardelli did not have much luck in the coaching jobs that followed, which included spells with Bari, the Egyptian national team and Arezzo.

Tardelli served for a short time as part of the administrative council of his former club Juventus in 2006, before resigning in 2007 allegedly due to differences with the hierarchy regarding the direction the club was heading towards. In February 2008, he joined the coaching staff of the Republic of Ireland national team as an assistant manager to the recently appointed Giovanni Trapattoni. He was reunited with former Juventus teammate Liam Brady, who was also named as Trapattoni's assistant.

Tardelli parted ways with the Republic of Ireland national team on 11 September 2013 by mutual consent, after a defeat by Austria the previous day.

== Personal life ==
Tardelli came from a working-class family, and was the youngest of four children. His father was a factory worker for Anas and his mother was a housewife. Known for his left-wing political views, he described himself in his youth and his father as communists. In his highschool years, he earned money working during the summers as a waiter in the piazza dei Miracoli in Pisa. He obtained a highschool diploma in surveying.

In her 1991 autobiography, La filosofia di Moana ("Moana's philosophy," in Italian), Italian adult film actress Moana Pozzi claimed to have had an affair with Tardelli.

Tardelli has two children: a daughter, Sara (a journalist), from his first marriage, and a son Nicola (a model), from his relationship with reporter Stella Pende.

Since 2016, Tardelli has been in a relationship with journalist Myrta Merlino. Tardelli was one of over 80 Italian celebrities to sign a petition in favour of the 2016 referendum on constitutional reform.

== Career statistics ==
=== Club ===
Appearances and goals by club, season and competition
Club	Season	League			National cup		Europe		Total	
Club	Season	Division	Apps	Goals	Apps	Goals	Apps	Goals	Apps	Goals
Pisa	1972–73	Serie C	8	2	–		–		8	2
Pisa	1973–74	Serie C	33	2	–		–		33	2
Pisa	Total		41	4	0	0	0	0	41	4
Como	1974–75	Serie B	36	2			–		36	2
Juventus	1975–76	Serie A	26	2	4	0	3 (Note: Appearances in European Cup)	0	33	2
Juventus	1976–77	Serie A	28	4	4	1	12 (Note: Appearances in UEFA Cup)	2	44	7
Juventus	1977–78	Serie A	26	4	4	1	6	1	36	6
Juventus	1978–79	Serie A	29	4	9	3	2	0	40	7
Juventus	1979–80	Serie A	18	4	2	0	7 (Note: Appearances in UEFA Cup Winners' Cup)	0	27	4
Juventus	1980–81	Serie A	28	7	6	0	3	1	37	8
Juventus	1981–82	Serie A	22	3	4	1	3	0	29	4
Juventus	1982–83	Serie A	26	5	10	1	8	3	44	9
Juventus	1983–84	Serie A	28	0	6	1	8	1	42	2
Juventus	1984–85	Serie A	28	2	6	0	9 (Note: Eight appearances and one goal in European Cup, one appearance in UEFA Super Cup)	1	43	3
Juventus	Total		259	35	55	8	61	9	375	52
Inter Milan	1985–86	Serie A	19	2	7	2	9	3	34	7
Inter Milan	1986–87	Serie A	24	0	7	1	6	0	37	1
Inter Milan	Total		43	2	14	3	14	3	71	8
St. Gallen	1987–88	Nationalliga A	14	0			–		14	0
Career total			393	43	69	11	75	12	537	66

=== International ===
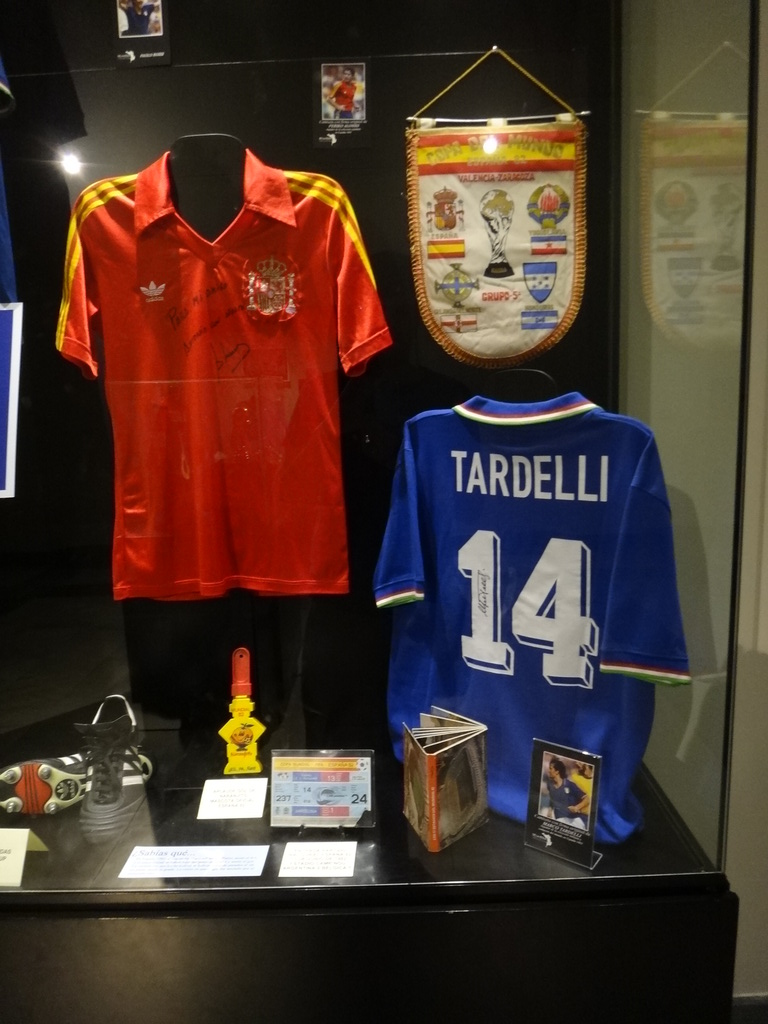
Tardelli's No.14 Italy shirt

Appearances and goals by national team and year
National team	Year	Apps	Goals
Italy	1976	8	0
Italy	1977	7	0
Italy	1978	13	1
Italy	1979	4	2
Italy	1980	12	1
Italy	1981	6	0
Italy	1982	13	2
Italy	1983	4	0
Italy	1984	7	0
Italy	1985	6	0
Total		81	6

=== Manager ===
Team	From	To	Record				
Team	From	To	G	W	D	L	Win %
Como	26 June 1993	13 June 1995	79	23	26	30	29.11
Cesena	13 June 1995	25 October 1996	48	15	13	20	31.25
Italy U21	18 December 1997	10 October 2000	25	18	5	2	72.00
Inter Milan	7 October 2000	19 June 2001	41	15	14	12	36.59
Bari	29 December 2002	11 November 2003	39	11	15	13	28.21
Egypt	25 March 2004	11 October 2004	8	5	1	2	62.50
Arezzo	28 February 2005	21 April 2005	6	2	1	3	33.33
Total			246	89	75	82	36.18

== Honours ==
=== Player ===
Juventus

- Serie A: 1976–77, 1977–78, 1980–81, 1981–82, 1983–84
- Coppa Italia: 1978–79, 1982–83
- European Cup: 1984–85
- UEFA Cup: 1976–77
- UEFA Cup Winners' Cup: 1983–84
- UEFA Super Cup: 1984

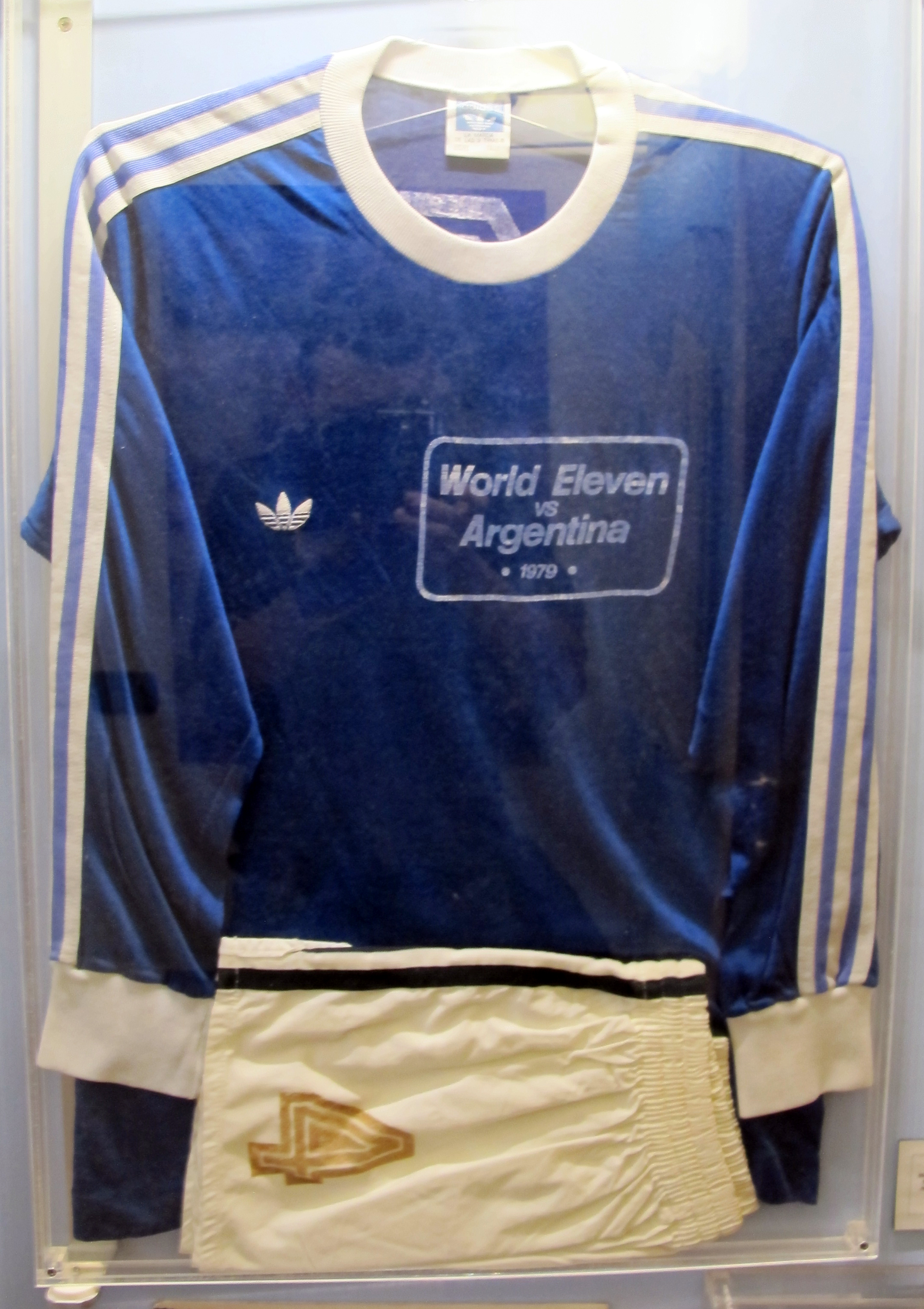
Tardelli's FIFA XI kit, on display at the Museo del Calcio in Florence.

Italy

- FIFA World Cup: 1982

Individual

- UEFA Golden Jubilee Poll: #37
- World XI: 1979
- UEFA European Championship Team of the Tournament: 1980
- Guerin Sportivo All-Star Team: 1982
- Italian Football Hall of Fame: 2015
- Juventus FC Hall of Fame: 2025

=== Coach ===
Italy U21

- Mediterranean Games: 1997
- UEFA European Under-21 Championship: 2000

== See also ==
- List of players to have won the three main European club competitions
