= Antonello Cuccureddu =

Italian footballer and manager (born 1949)

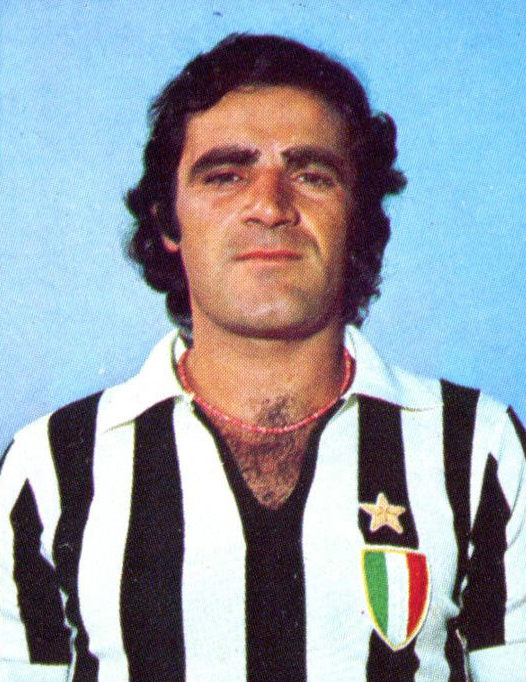
- Cuccureddu with Juventus in 1975

Personal information
- Date of birth: 4 October 1949 (age 77)
- Place of birth: Alghero, Italy
- Height: 1.80 m (5 ft 11 in)
- Positions: Defender; midfielder

Team information
- Current team: Grosseto (manager)

Youth career
- Alghero

Senior career*
Years	Team	Apps	(Gls)
1966–1967	Torres	34	(0)
1967–1969	Brescia	22	(0)
1969–1981	Juventus	303	(26)
1981–1984	Fiorentina	34	(0)
1984–1985	Novara	22	(0)
Total		415	(26)

International career
1975–1978	Italy	13	(0)

Managerial career
- 1989–1995: Juventus (youth team)
- 1997–1998: Acireale
- 1998: Ternana
- 1999–2001: Crotone
- 2002–2003: Al-Ittihad Tripoli
- 2004–2005: Avellino
- 2005–2006: Torres
- 2006–2007: Grosseto
- 2007–2008: Perugia
- 2009–2010: Pescara
- 2013–2014: Grosseto
- * Club domestic league appearances and goals as of 27 January 2014

Antonello Cuccureddu (Italian pronunciation: [antoˈnɛllo kukkuˈrɛddu], Sardinian: [kukuˈɾeɖːu]; 4 October 1949) is an Italian association football coach and former player who played as a defender. He last managed Lega Pro Prima Divisione club Grosseto in 2014.

== Club career ==
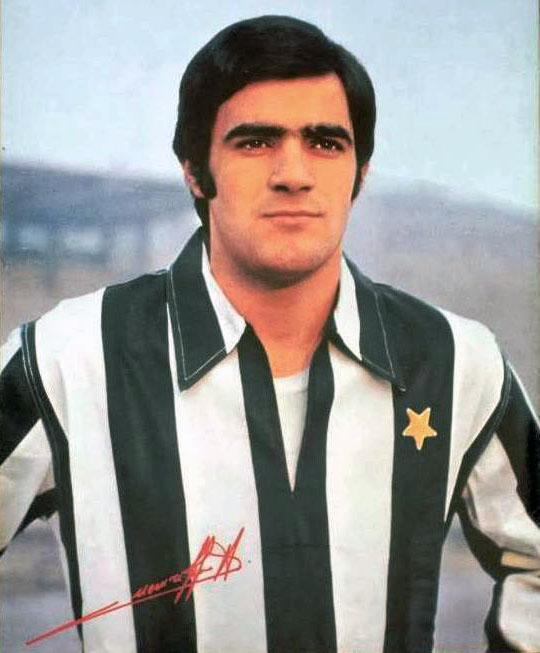
Cuccureddu with Bianconeri in 1969

A central defender, Cuccureddu spent his club playing career with Brescia (1968–69), Juventus (1969–81, winning six Serie A titles), and Fiorentina (1981–83).

Rather prolific for being a defender (he had a very strong long distance shot), in one league season he managed to score 12 goals (during the 1973–74 Italian Serie A season), although in that season he played as a midfielder. His most famous goal in the league was scored at the Stadio Olimpico in Rome, facing A.S. Roma in the last match of the 1972–73 Serie A season while the game was less than three minutes shy from being over. With that goal Juventus beat Roma 2–1 and won their 15th domestic title by 1 point over A.C. Milan, who were leading the league until the final match of the season, and finished 2 points over S.S. Lazio.

== International career ==
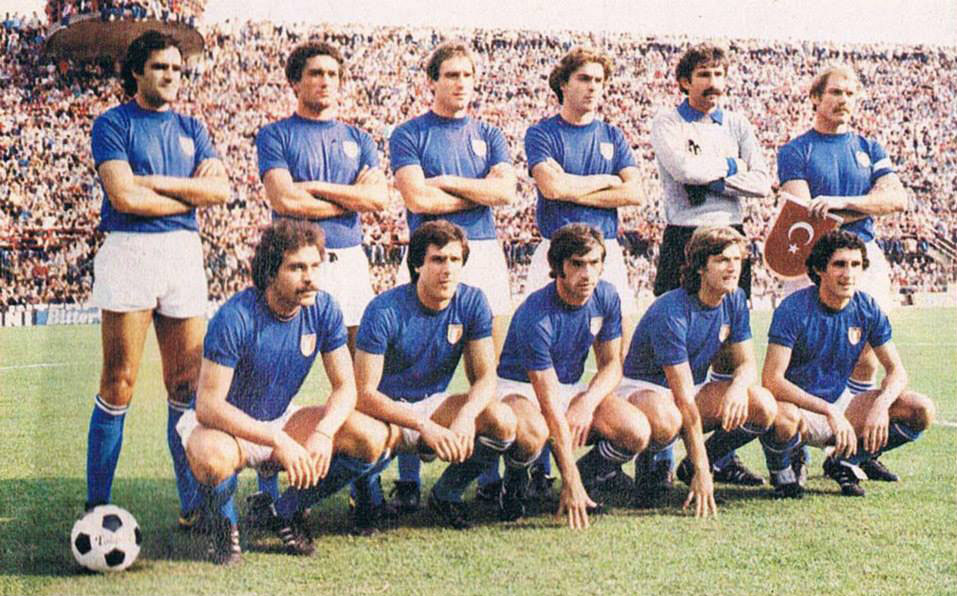
Cuccureddu (standing, first from the left) with the Italy national team at Florence in 1978

At international level, Cuccureddu earned 13 caps for the Italy national football team, and played in the 1978 FIFA World Cup (where he featured in 5 fixtures, including the match against Argentina, which Italy won 1–0, and the 3rd place final against Brazil, which Italy lost 1–2).

== Style of play ==
Cuccureddu was a hard-working and tactically versatile footballer, who was capable of aiding his team both offensively and defensively, and of playing anywhere in defence or midfield. Throughout his career, he was primarily deployed as a defender, and was capable of playing as an offensive wing-back, as a full-back, or as a centre-back, which was his usual position. He also played in midfield on occasion, which was his initial position at the beginning of his career, and was deployed as a mezzala, as a central, box-to-box, defensive midfielder, or attacking midfielder on occasion.

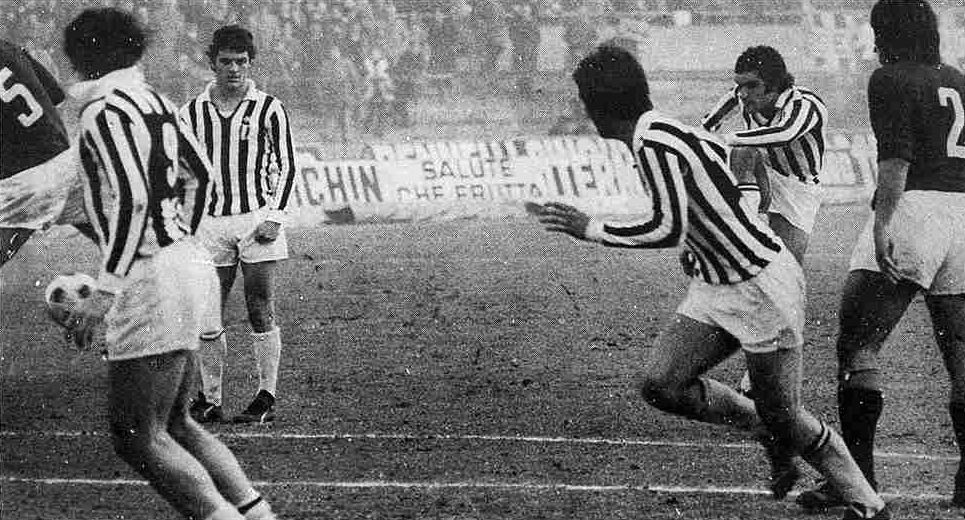
Cuccureddu (second from right) scoring a goal from a free kick for Juventus in 1974

As a footballer, he was known in particular for his dynamism, stamina, his ability to read the game, vision, and tactical intelligence. Although he was primarily a defensive-minded player, he was quite prolific in front of goal throughout his career, as he possessed an accurate and powerful shot with his right foot from outside the area, which also made him a dangerous goal threat; due to his striking ability, he was an accurate set-piece and penalty kick taker.

== Managerial career ==
As a coach, he won both the Torneo di Viareggio and the Campionato Nazionale Primavera in 1994 with the Juventus Primavera side. During the 1999–2000 Serie C1 season, he led Crotone to the Girone B title, helping the club to Serie B promotion.

In the 2006–07 season he led Grosseto to become Serie C1/A winners and gain a historical first-ever promotion to Serie B. Cuccureddu left Grosseto soon after the end of the season to join Serie C1 club Perugia, where he did not manage to repeat his successes at Grosseto. From March 2009 he was the new head coach of Lega Pro Prima Divisione side Pescara; this adventure ended in January 2010, when he was replaced by Eusebio Di Francesco, former coach of Lanciano. In 2013, he returned to Grosseto in Lega Pro Prima Divisione, where he remained until January 2014, after being sacked, due to the club's negative results.

== Coaching tactics ==
As a coach, Cuccureddu built his teams on tactically traditional formations, based on defensive stability, favouring a four-man defensive line in either a 4–4–2, or a 4–3–1–2 formation.

== Honours ==
=== Player ===
Juventus

- Serie A (6): 1971–72, 1972–73, 1974–75, 1976–77, 1977–78, 1980–81
- Coppa Italia: 1978–79
- UEFA Cup: 1976–77

Individual

- Juventus FC Hall of Fame: 2025

=== Manager ===
Juventus Primavera

- Torneo di Viareggio: 1994
- Campionato Nazionale Primavera: 1993–94

Crotone

- Serie C1 (Girone B): 1999–2000

Grosseto

- Serie C1 (Girone A): 2006–07
