= Franco Causio =

Italian footballer (born 1949)

- Franco Causio

Personal information
- Full name: Franco Causio
- Date of birth: 1 February 1949 (age 77)
- Place of birth: Lecce, Italy
- Height: 1.70 m (5 ft 7 in)
- Position: Right winger

Senior career*
Years	Team	Apps	(Gls)
1964–1965	Lecce	3	(0)
1965–1966	Sambenedettese	13	(0)
1966–1968	Juventus	1	(0)
1968–1969	Reggina	30	(5)
1969–1970	Palermo	22	(3)
1970–1981	Juventus	304	(49)
1981–1984	Udinese	83	(11)
1984–1985	Inter	24	(0)
1985–1986	Lecce	26	(3)
1986–1988	Triestina	64	(5)
	Total	570	(76)

International career
1972–1983	Italy	63	(6)
Medal record
Representing Italy
FIFA World Cup
Winner	1982 Spain
- * Club domestic league appearances and goals

Franco Causio (Italian pronunciation: [ˈfraŋko ˈkauzjo]; born 1 February 1949) is an Italian former professional footballer who won the 1982 FIFA World Cup and came through the ranks of his hometown club Lecce before making his name at Juventus for many years in the 1970s and 1980s. Throughout his career, he was given the nickname "The Baron" due to his playing style, upbringing, and sportsmanship.

== Club career ==
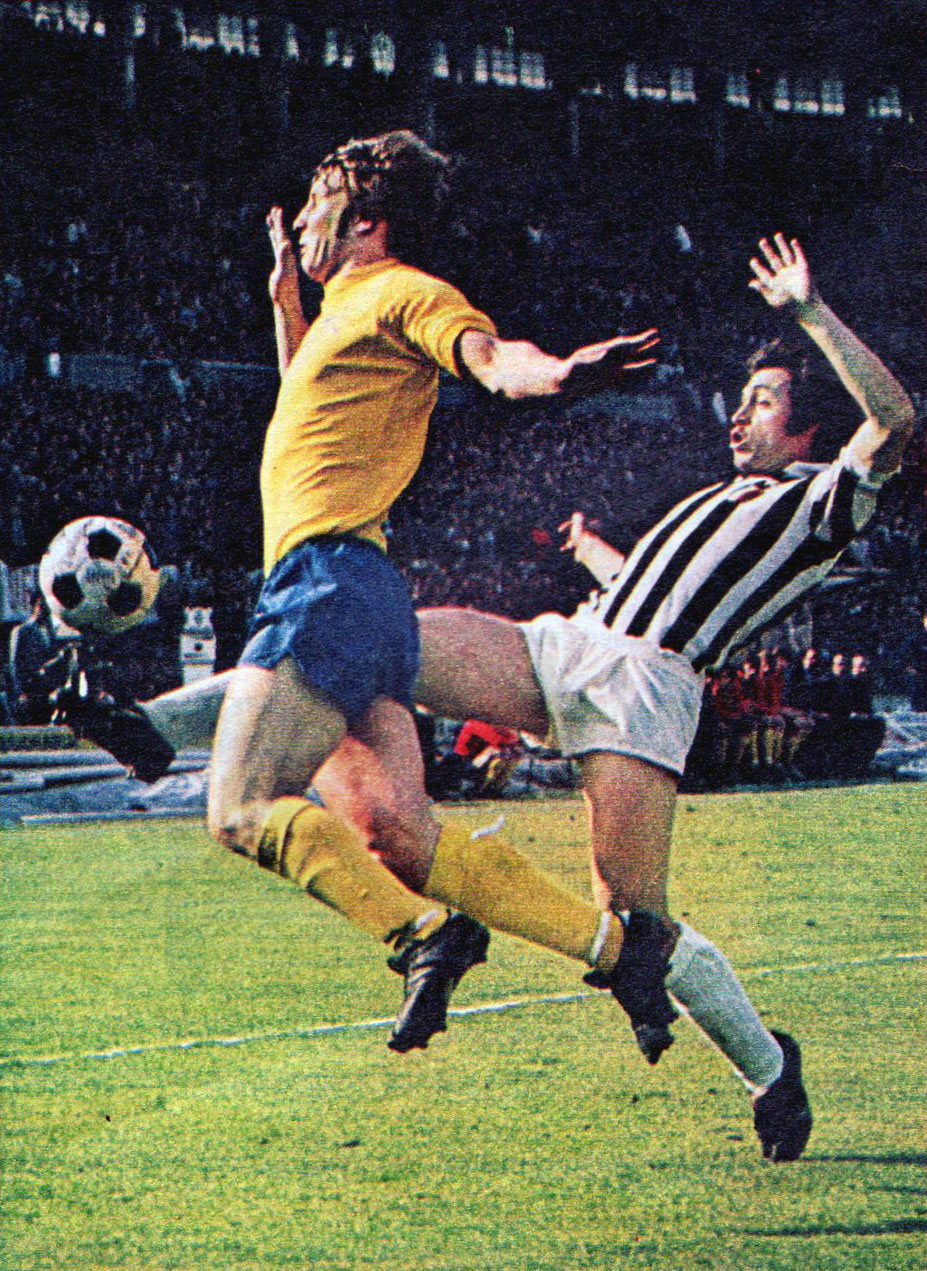
Causio (right) with Juventus in 1973, against Todd of Derby County (left), during the semifinal round of the European Cup.

After some years on loan in Serie B (playing in Reggina and Palermo), he returned to Juventus in 1970. For 11 years he wore the number 7 jersey for Juventus, and played alongside notable players such as Roberto Bettega, Roberto Boninsegna, Pietro Anastasi, Claudio Gentile, Marco Tardelli, Dino Zoff, Gaetano Scirea and Antonio Cabrini. During his period with the club, he won the Scudetto six times, as well as winning a Coppa Italia, and an UEFA Cup. He also reached the European Cup final with Juventus during the 1972–73 season, as well as the Intercontinental Cup final that same year, narrowly missing out on a treble with the club, following their defeat in the Coppa Italia final that season, despite their Serie A title. His best finish in the European Cup Winners' Cup was during the 1979–80 season, when Juventus reached the semi-finals of the tournament.

Immediately after winning the Scudetto for the sixth time in his final season with Juventus, he moved to Udinese in 1981, where he played for three years, teaming up with Brazil national team star player Zico. Following his time at Udinese he played for Inter, and then joined his local town's football team, Lecce, in its debut in Serie A (1985–86). He finished his career playing for Serie B team Triestina at the age of 39.

== International career ==
Causio made his debut with the Italy national team on 29 April 1972 in a 0–0 draw against Belgium, in a UEFA Euro 1972 qualifying match. He was in the Italian squad at the 1974 World Cup, and at the 1978 World Cup, where the Italians finished in fourth place after reaching the semi-final. He also represented Italy at the 1980 UEFA European Football Championship on home soil, where they once again finished in fourth place after a semi-final finish. He was most notably a member of the Italy squad that won the 1982 World Cup. With two red cards throughout his international career, he holds the record for the most red cards in the history of the Italy national team, alongside Giancarlo Antognoni and Daniele De Rossi.

== Style of play ==
Causio was usually deployed as a wide midfielder on the right flank, although he was also capable of playing in several other midfield positions, and was also often used as an offensive playmaker, or as a left winger. A creative footballer, he had very good dribbling skills, and was an accurate crosser of the ball. In addition to his ball control and technical ability, he was also a hard-working player, which enabled him to flank effectively, and aid his team defensively as well as offensively. He is considered by several pundits to be one of Italy's greatest wingers ever.

== Honours ==
Juventus

- Serie A (6): 1971–72, 1972–73, 1974–75, 1976–77, 1977–78, 1980–81
- Coppa Italia: 1978–79
- UEFA Cup: 1976–77

Italy

- FIFA World Cup: 1982

Individual

- Sport Ideal European XI: 1976
- World Soccer World XI: 1977, 1978
- Serie A Team of The Year: 1982
- Guerin d'Oro: 1982
- Juventus FC Hall of Fame: 2025
