= Giuseppe Furino =

Italian footballer (born 1946)

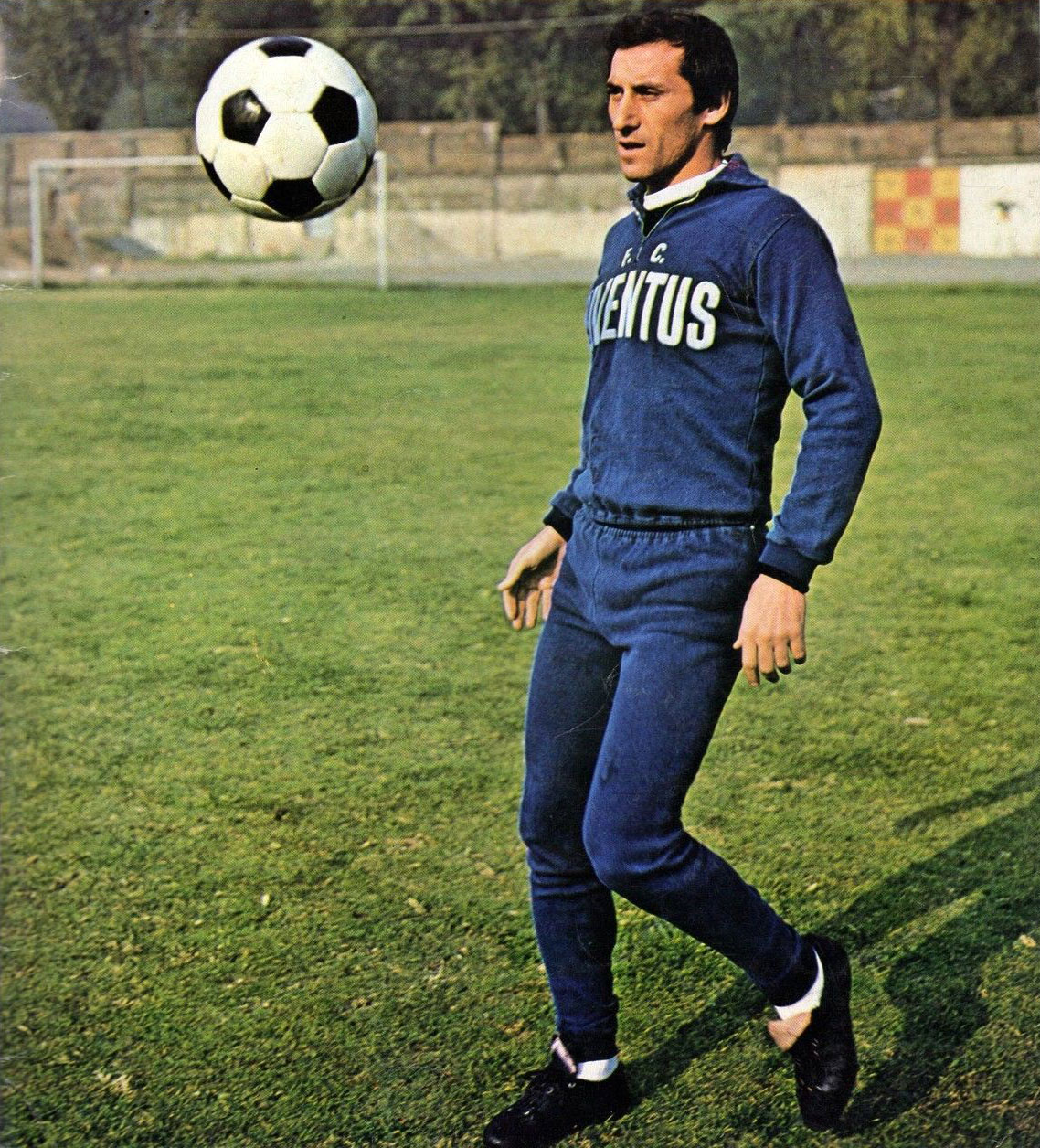
- Furino with Juventus in 1974

Personal information
- Full name: Giuseppe Furino
- Date of birth: 5 July 1946 (age 80)
- Place of birth: Palermo, Italy
- Height: 1.67 m (5 ft 6 in)
- Position: Defensive midfielder

Youth career
- Juventus

Senior career*
| Years | Team | Apps | (Gls) |
| 1966–1968 | Savona | 61 | (7) |
| 1968–1969 | Palermo | 27 | (1) |
| 1969–1984 | Juventus | 361 | (8) |
| Total | | 449 | (16) |

International career
| 1970–1974 | Italy | 3 | (0) |
Medal record
Men's football
Representing Italy (as player)
FIFA World Cup
| Runner-up | 1970 Mexico |
- * Club domestic league appearances and goals as of 1 June 2009

Giuseppe Furino (Italian pronunciation: [dʒuˈzɛppe fuˈriːno]; born 5 July 1946) is an Italian retired footballer who played as a midfielder. A small yet tenacious and physical player, Furino was nicknamed Furia ("Fury") and was known for his work-rate and energy in midfield, as well as his ability to break down possession as a defensive midfielder, although he was also gifted with good technical skills. He began his club career with Savona in 1966, and later spent a season with Palermo in 1968.

In 1969, Furino moved to Juventus, where he remained for 13 seasons, also serving as the club's captain, and achieved great success, winning several domestic and international titles (two Coppa Italia, one UEFA Cup, and one European Cup Winners' Cup), including a then Italian record of eight Serie A championships. At international level, he represented Italy at the 1970 FIFA World Cup, where he won a runners-up medal.

== Club career ==
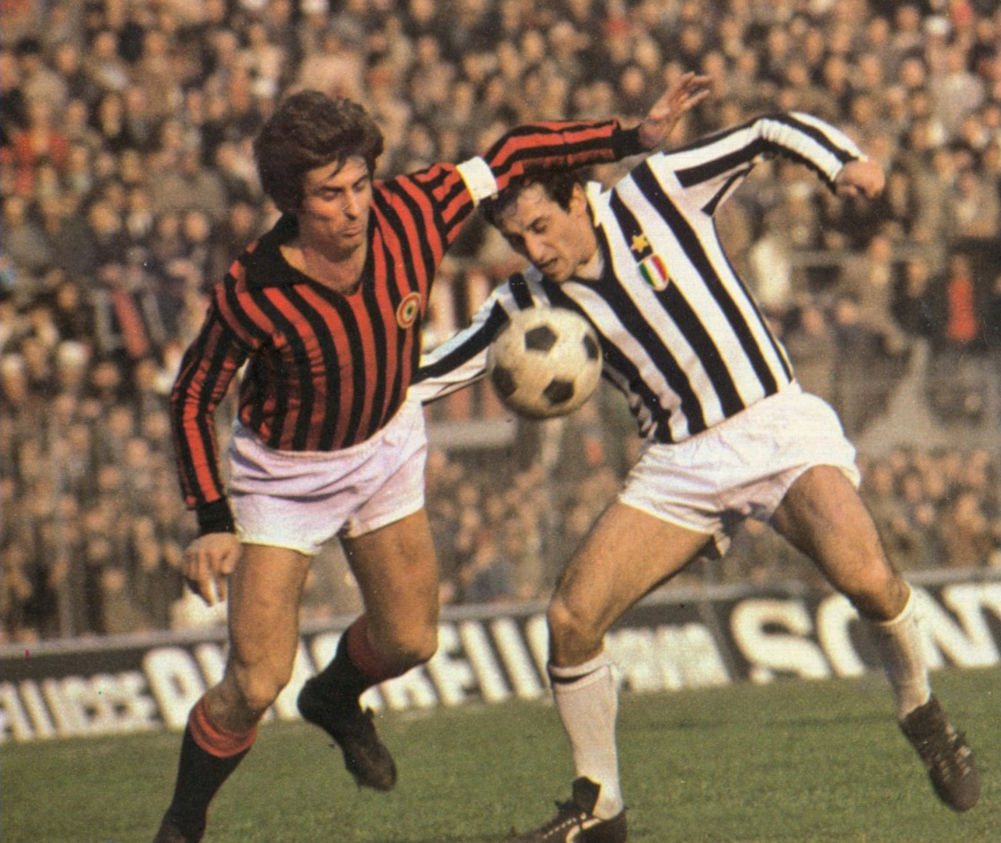
Furino (right) versus Milan's Gianni Rivera in 1973

Furino was born in Palermo on 5 July 1946. Having originally started his career at Juventus as a youngster he played for Savona and Palermo. He made his Serie A debut for Palermo against Cagliari on 29 August 1968, and he then transferred to Juventus for the 1969–70 Serie A season. Furino made his debut for Juventus in a Coppa Italia match against Mantova on 31 August 1969. He was to go on and play for Juventus for 15 successive seasons, with his last match coming against Avellino on 6 May 1984. In all, he made 361 Serie A appearances for Juventus, and 528 in all senior competitions for them, scoring 19 goals, also serving as the team's captain.

Furino won eight Italian league championships with Juventus. This was the most Italian titles a player has won, a record he shared with Giovanni Ferrari and Gianluigi Buffon (Virginio Rosetta also won eight national championships, but three of them came before the formation of a professional Serie A) until Buffon won its tenth (the 2019–20 Serie A). During his time with Juventus, he also won the Coppa Italia twice, as well as the 1976–77 UEFA Cup and the 1983–84 European Cup Winners' Cup, also reaching the European Cup final in 1973 and 1983, as well as the 1973 Intercontinental Cup final.

== International career ==
Furino played three times for the Italy national football team between 1970 and 1974, and he also took part at the 1970 FIFA World Cup with Italy, where they reached the final. He made his international debut during the tournament, in Italy's match against Uruguay on 6 June 1970, coming on as a substitute for Angelo Domenghini.

== Style of play ==
Despite his small stature, Furino was a tenacious and tactically versatile player, who excelled in his defensive midfield role due to his strong physique. Nicknamed Furia ("Fury") by the Juventus fans, he was known as an aggressive, hard-working, and hard-tackling ball-winner, whose main attributes were his pace, stamina, and his ability to read the game. He was also a team player, and he possessed good technical ability despite his playing role.

== Honours ==
Juventus

- Serie A: 1971–72, 1972–73, 1974–75, 1976–77, 1977–78, 1980–81, 1981–82, 1983–84
- Coppa Italia: 1978–79, 1982–83
- UEFA Cup: 1976–77
- UEFA Cup Winners' Cup: 1983–84
- Intercontinental Cup: runner-up: 1973
- European Cup: runner-up: 1972–73, 1982–83
- Inter-Cities Fairs Cup runner-up: 1970-71

Italy

- FIFA World Cup: runner-up 1970

Individual

- Juventus FC Hall of Fame: 2025

== See also ==
- Football records and statistics in Italy
