= Giancarlo Alessandrelli =

Italian footballer (born 1952)

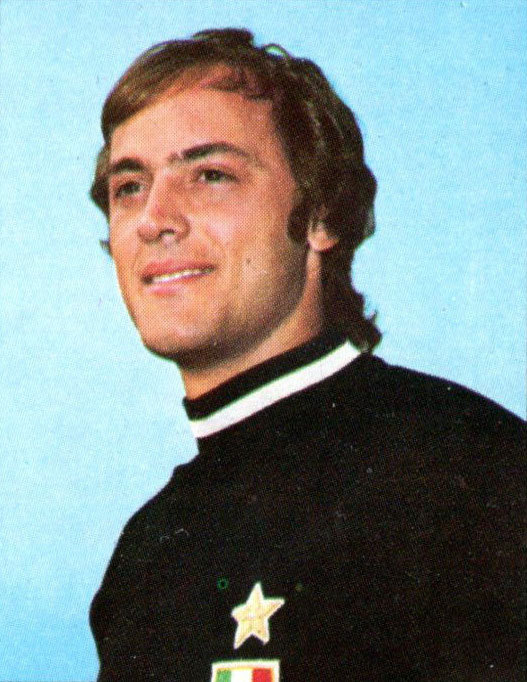
- Alessandrelli with Juventus in 1975

Personal information
- Date of birth: 4 March 1952 (age 74)
- Place of birth: Senigallia, Italy
- Height: 1.85 m (6 ft 1 in)
- Position: Goalkeeper

Senior career*
Years	Team	Apps	(Gls)
1971–1972	Juventus	0	(0)
1972–1973	Ternana	15	(0)
1973–1974	Arezzo	32	(0)
1974	Juventus	0	(0)
1974–1975	Reggiana	3	(0)
1975–1979	Juventus	1	(0)
1979–1980	Atalanta	14	(0)
1980–1981	Sanremese	34	(0)
1981–1982	Atalanta	0	(0)
1982–1983	Rondinella	27	(0)
1983–1984	Fiorentina	0	(0)
1985–1986	Rondinella	9	(0)
- * Club domestic league appearances and goals

Giancarlo Alessandrelli (born 4 March 1952 in Senigallia) is an Italian former professional football player who played as a goalkeeper.

== Honours ==
Juventus

- Serie A champion: 1976–77, 1977–78.
- Coppa Italia winner: 1978–79.
