= 1981–82 Juventus FC season =

Italian football club season

Juventus
1981–82 season
- President: Giampiero Boniperti
- Head Coach: Giovanni Trapattoni
- Stadium: Comunale
- Serie A: 1st (In 1982-83 European Cup)
- Coppa Italia: First Round
- European Cup: Second Round
- Top goalscorer: League: Pietro Paolo Virdis (9); All: Pietro Paolo Virdis (12)
Home colours	Away colours

Juventus Football Club finished the season as Serie A champions. They also participated in the Coppa Italia and the European Cup.

== Squad ==
Note: Flags indicate national team as defined under FIFA eligibility rules; some limited exceptions apply. Players may hold more than one non-FIFA nationality.

Pos.	Nation	Player
GK	ITA	Luciano Bodini
GK	ITA	Dino Zoff
DF	ITA	Sergio Brio
DF	ITA	Antonio Cabrini
DF	ITA	Claudio Gentile
DF	ITA	Carlo Osti
DF	ITA	Gaetano Scirea
MF	SMR	Massimo Bonini
MF	ITA	Giuseppe Furino
MF	IRL	Liam Brady
MF	ITA	Pietro Fanna

Pos.	Nation	Player
MF	ITA	Giovanni Koetting
MF	ITA	Domenico Marocchino
MF	ITA	Cesare Prandelli
MF	ITA	Marco Tardelli
MF	ITA	Roberto Tavola
FW	ITA	Roberto Bettega
FW	ITA	Giuseppe Galderisi
FW	ITA	Paolo Rossi
FW	ITA	Pietro Paolo Virdis

=== Transfers ===
In
Pos.	Name	from	Type
MF	Massimo Bonini	AC Cesena	
FW	Paolo Rossi	Vicenza	
MF	Giovanni Koetting	Udinese	loan ended
MF	Roberto Tavola	Atalanta BC	loan ended
FW	Pietro Paolo Virdis	Atalanta BC	loan ended

Out
Pos.	Name	To	Type
MF	Franco Causio	Udinese	
DF	Antonello Cuccureddu	Fiorentina	
MF	Vinicio Verza	AC Cesena	
DF	Massimo Storgato	AC Cesena	

== Competitions ==
=== Serie A ===
==== League table ====
Pos	Team	Pld	W	D	L	GF	GA	GD	Pts	Qualification or relegation
1	Juventus (Note: Juventus became the first team in Italian football to be awarded two golden stars, to commemorate their 20th title win.) (C)	30	19	8	3	48	14	+34	46	Qualification to European Cup
2	Fiorentina	30	17	11	2	36	17	+19	45	Qualification to UEFA Cup
3	Roma	30	15	8	7	40	29	+11	38	Qualification to UEFA Cup
4	Napoli (Note: Napoli obtained a UEFA spot for the Albanian political renounce.)	30	10	15	5	31	21	+10	35	Qualification to UEFA Cup
5	Internazionale	30	11	13	6	39	34	+5	35	Qualification to Cup Winners' Cup

Source: RSSSF.com
Rules for classification: 1) points; 2) Head-to-head points; 3) goal difference; 4) number of goals scored.
(C) Champions

==== Results by round ====
Round	1	2	3	4	5	6	7	8	9	10	11	12	13	14	15	16	17	18	19	20	21	22	23	24	25	26	27	28	29	30
Ground	H	A	H	A	H	A	H	A	H	A	A	H	H	A	H	A	H	A	H	A	H	A	H	A	H	H	A	A	H	A
Result	W	W	W	W	W	W	L	L	W	D	L	D	W	D	W	D	W	W	W	W	W	W	W	D	D	D	W	W	D	W
Position	1	1	1	1	1	1	1	2	1	1	1	2	2	2	2	2	2	1	1	1	1	1	1	1	1	1	1	1	1	1

Source: Competitive matches
A = Away; H = Home; W = Win; D = Draw; L = Loss; P = Postponed; = Leader, 1982–83 European Cup; = 1982–83 UEFA Cup; = 1982-83 Serie B; R = 1982-83 UEFA Cup Winners' Cup

==== Matches ====
13 September 1981 1	Juventus	6–1	Cesena	Turin
	Bettega 1', 18', 80'; Scirea 15', 58'; Fanna 67'		35' Verza	Stadium: Comunale; Referee: Longhi

20 September 1981 2	Avellino	0–1	Juventus	Avellino
			18' Virdis	Stadium: Stadio Partenio; Referee: Barbaresco

27 September 1981 3	Juventus	3–1	Como	Turin
	Cabrini 18'; Bettega 34' (pen.); Scirea 85'		59' Fontolan	Stadium: Comunale; Referee: Lo Bello

4 October 1981 4	Milan	0–1	Juventus	Milan
			66' Virdis	Stadium: San Siro; Referee: D'Elia

11 October 1981 5	Juventus	1–0	Cagliari	Turin
	Bettega 87'			Stadium: Comunale; Referee: Pieri

25 October 1981 6	Torino	0–1	Juventus	Turin
			62' Gentile	Stadium: Comunale; Referee: Menegali

1 November 1981 7	Juventus	0–1	Roma	Turin
			49' Falcão	Stadium: Comunale; Referee: Casarin

8 November 1981 8	Genoa	2–1	Juventus	Genoa
	Romano II 25'; Iachini 61'		14' Cabrini	Stadium: Luigi Ferraris; Referee: Barbaresco

22 November 1981 9	Juventus	2–0	Bologna	Turin
	Virdis 17'; Cabrini 48'			Stadium: Comunale; Referee: D'Elia

29 November 1981 10	Juventus	0–0	Fiorentina	Turin
				Stadium: Comunale; Referee: Menegali

13 December 1981 11	Ascoli	1–0	Juventus	Ascoli Piceno
	Nicolini 66'			Stadium: Stadio Cino e Lillo Del Duca; Referee: Bergamo (Livorno)

20 December 1981 12	Inter Milan	0–0	Juventus	Milan
				Stadium: Stadio Giuseppe Meazza; Referee: D'Elia (Salerno)

3 January 1982 13	Juventus	1–0	Udinese	Turin
	Galderisi 52'			Stadium: Comunale; Referee: Ciulli (Rome)

10 January 1982 14	Napoli	0–0	Juventus	Naples
				Stadium: Stadio San Paolo; Referee: Longhi

17 January 1982 15	Juventus	4–1	Catanzaro	Turin
	Galderisi 2', 21'; Zaninelli 37' (o.g.); Bonini 83'		44' Santarini	Stadium: Comunale; Referee: Lo Bello (Siracusa)

24 January 1982 16	Cesena	1–1	Juventus	Cesena
	Garlini 9'		71' Brio	Stadium: Stadio Dino Manuzzi; Referee: Menegali (Rome)

31 January 1982 17	Juventus	4–0	Avellino	Turin
	Virdis 4', 46', 83' (pen.); Brady 27' (pen.)			Stadium: Comunale; Referee: Casarin (Milan)

7 February 1982 18	Como	0–2	Juventus	Como
			78' Gentile; 87' Brady	Stadium: Stadio Giuseppe Sinigaglia; Referee: Pieri (Genoa)

14 February 1982 19	Juventus	3–2	Milan	Turin
	Galderisi 17', 63', 83'		44' Collovati; 71' Antonelli	Stadium: Comunale; Referee: Ciulli

28 February 1982 20	Cagliari	0–1	Juventus	Cagliari
			27' Tardelli	Stadium: Stadio Sant'Elia; Referee: Longhi

7 March 1982 21	Juventus	4–2	Torino	Turin
	Tardelli 24'; Scirea 28', 40'; Brady 89'		19' Bonesso; 22' Dossena	Stadium: Comunale; Referee: Bergamo

14 March 1982 22	Roma	0–3	Juventus	Rome
			8', 38' Virdis; 32' (o.g.) Marangon I	Stadium: Stadio Olimpico; Referee: D'Elia

21 March 1982 23	Juventus	1–0	Genoa	Turin
	Faccenda 52' (o.g.)			Stadium: Comunale; Referee: Ciulli

28 March 1982 24	Bologna	0–0	Juventus	Bologna
				Stadium: Stadio Renato Dall'Ara; Referee: Barbaresco (Cormons)

4 April 1982 25	Fiorentina	0–0	Juventus	Florence
				Stadium: Stadio Comunale; Referee: Casarin

18 April 1982 26	Juventus	1–1	Ascoli	Turin
	Tardelli 13'		58' Pircher	Stadium: Comunale; Referee: Lombardo

25 April 1982 27	Juventus	1–0	Inter Milan	Turin
	Brady 76' (pen.)			Stadium: Comunale; Referee: Barbaresco

2 May 1982 28	Udinese	1–5	Juventus	Udine
	Miano 2'		30' Marocchino; 36', 85' Cabrini; 49' Rossi; 90' Virdis	Stadium: Stadio Friuli; Referee: D'Elia

9 May 1982 29	Juventus	0–0	Napoli	Turin
				Stadium: Comunale; Referee: Casarin

16 May 1982 30	Catanzaro	0–1	Juventus	Catanzaro
			75' (pen.) Brady	Stadium: Stadio Comunale; Referee: Pieri

=== Coppa Italia ===
First round

23 August 1981 1	Rimini	1–3	Juventus	Rimini
	Bilardi 9'		26' Bettega; 59', 73' Virdis	Stadium: Stadio Romeo Neri; Referee: Longhi

26 August 1981 2	Cavese	0–2	Juventus	Cava de' Tirreni
			3' Marocchino; 83' Tardelli	Stadium: Comunale; Referee: Mattei

30 August 1981 3	Juventus	2–2	Perugia	Turin
	Brady 11'; Bettega 46'		49' Ambu; 90' Dal Fiume	Stadium: Comunale; Referee: D'Elia

6 September 1981 4	Juventus	0–1	Torino	Turin
			61' Dossena	Stadium: Comunale; Referee: Bergamo

=== European Cup ===
==== First round ====
16 September 1981 1	Celtic (Scotland)	1–0	(Italy) Juventus	Glasgow, Scotland
	MacLeod 65'			Stadium: Celtic Park

30 September 1981 2	Juventus (Italy)	2–0 (2–1 agg.)	(Scotland) Celtic	Turin, Italy
	Virdis 28'; Bettega 40'			Stadium: Stadio Olimpico di Torino

==== Second round ====
21 October 1981 1	Anderlecht (Belgium)	3–1	(Italy) Juventus	Brussels, Belgium
	Geurts 24', 56'; Vercauteren 88'		Marocchino 39'

4 November 1981 2	Juventus (Italy)	1–1 (2–4 agg.)	(Belgium) Anderlecht	Turin, Italy
	Brio 79'		Geurts 41'	Stadium: Stadio Olimpico di Torino

== Statistics ==
=== Players statistics ===
No.	Pos	Nat	Player	Total		Serie A		Serie A		Serie A	
No.	Pos	Nat	Player	Apps	Goals	Apps	Goals	Apps	Goals	Apps	Goals
	GK	(Italy) ITA	Dino Zoff	38	-23	30	-14	4	-4	4	-5
	DF	(Italy) ITA	Claudio Gentile	35	2	27	2	4	0	4	0
	DF	(Italy) ITA	Gaetano Scirea	38	5	30	5	4	0	4	0
	DF	(Italy) ITA	Sergio Brio	36	2	29	1	3	0	4	1
	DF	(Italy) ITA	Antonio Cabrini	37	5	29	5	4	0	4	0
	MF	(Italy) ITA	Marco Tardelli	29	4	22	3	4	1	3	0
	MF	(San Marino) SMR	Massimo Bonini	36	1	13+15	1	4	0	4	0
	MF	(Italy) ITA	Giuseppe Furino	34	0	27	0	4	0	3	0
	MF	(Republic of Ireland) IRL	Liam Brady	37	6	29	5	4	1	4	0
	FW	(Italy) ITA	Domenico Marocchino	37	3	29	1	4	1	4	1
	FW	(Italy) ITA	Pietro Paolo Virdis	37	12	30	9	4	2	3	1
	GK	(Italy) ITA	Luciano Bodini	0	0	0	0	0	0	0	0
	FW	(Italy) ITA	Giuseppe Galderisi	16	6	11+5	6				
	FW	(Italy) ITA	Roberto Bettega	14	8	7	5	4	2	3	1
	MF	(Italy) ITA	Pietro Fanna	27	1	7+14	1	2	0	4	0
	DF	(Italy) ITA	Carlo Osti	7	0	5+1	0	1	0		
	FW	(Italy) ITA	Paolo Rossi	3	1	3	1				
	MF	(Italy) ITA	Cesare Prandelli	11	0	1+7	0	1	0	2	0
	MF	(Italy) ITA	Roberto Tavola	4	0	1+2	0	0	0	1	0
	MF	(Italy) ITA	Giovanni Koetting	0	0	0	0				

- Source: http://calcio-seriea.net/presenze/1981/858/
