= 1982–83 Juventus FC season =

Italian football club season

Juventus
1982–83 season
- Owner: Agnelli family
- President: Giampiero Boniperti
- Head Coach: Giovanni Trapattoni
- Stadium: Comunale
- Serie A: 2nd
- Coppa Italia: Champions (in UEFA Cup Winners' Cup)
- European Cup: Runners-up
- Top goalscorer: League: Michel Platini (16); All: Michel Platini (28)
| Home colours | Away colours | Third colours |

Juventus Football Club finished the season second in Serie A. They also won the Coppa Italia and reached the final of the European Cup.

== Squad ==
Note: Flags indicate national team as defined under FIFA eligibility rules; some limited exceptions apply. Players may hold more than one non-FIFA nationality.

| Pos. | Nation | Player |
|---|---|---|
| GK | ITA | Luciano Bodini |
| GK | ITA | Dino Zoff |
| DF | ITA | Sergio Brio |
| DF | ITA | Antonio Cabrini |
| DF | ITA | Claudio Gentile |
| DF | ITA | Carlo Osti |
| DF | ITA | Massimo Storgato |
| DF | ITA | Gaetano Scirea |
| MF | SMR | Massimo Bonini |
| MF | ITA | Giuseppe Furino (Captain) |

| Pos. | Nation | Player |
|---|---|---|
| MF | ITA | Giovanni Koetting |
| MF | ITA | Domenico Marocchino |
| MF | ITA | Cesare Prandelli |
| MF | ITA | Marco Tardelli |
| FW | ITA | Roberto Bettega |
| FW | POL | Zbigniew Boniek |
| FW | ITA | Giuseppe Galderisi |
| FW | ITA | Paolo Rossi |
| FW | FRA | Michel Platini |

=== Transfers ===
In
| Pos. | Name | from | Type |
|---|---|---|---|
| MF | Michel Platini | AS Saint-Etienne | |
| MF | Zbigniew Boniek | Widzew Łódź | |
| DF | Massimo Storgato | AC Cesena | loan ended |
| MF | Giovanni Koetting | S.P.A.L. | loan ended |

Out
| Pos. | Name | to | Type |
|---|---|---|---|
| MF | Liam Brady | UC Sampdoria | |
| MF | Pierino Fanna | Hellas Verona | |
| MF | Roberto Tavola | S.S. Lazio | loan |
| FW | Pietro Paolo Virdis | Udinese Calcio | |

==== Autumn ====
Out
| Pos. | Name | to | Type |
|---|---|---|---|
| DF | Carlo Osti | US Avellino | co-ownership |

== Competitions ==
=== Serie A ===
==== League table ====
| Pos | Team | Pld | W | D | L | GF | GA | GD | Pts | Qualification or relegation |
|---|---|---|---|---|---|---|---|---|---|---|
| 1 | Roma (C) | 30 | 16 | 11 | 3 | 47 | 24 | +23 | 43 | Qualification to European Cup |
| 2 | Juventus | 30 | 15 | 9 | 6 | 49 | 26 | +23 | 39 | Qualification to Cup Winners' Cup |
| 3 | Internazionale | 30 | 12 | 14 | 4 | 40 | 23 | +17 | 38 | Qualification to UEFA Cup |
| 4 | Hellas Verona | 30 | 11 | 13 | 6 | 37 | 31 | +6 | 35 | Qualification to UEFA Cup |
| 5 | Fiorentina | 30 | 12 | 10 | 8 | 36 | 25 | +11 | 34 | |

Source: Panini
Rules for classification: 1) points; 2) Head-to-head points; 3) goal difference; 4) number of goals scored.
(C) Champions

==== Results by round ====
| Round | 1 | 2 | 3 | 4 | 5 | 6 | 7 | 8 | 9 | 10 | 11 | 12 | 13 | 14 | 15 | 16 | 17 | 18 | 19 | 20 | 21 | 22 | 23 | 24 | 25 | 26 | 27 | 28 | 29 | 30 |
|---|---|---|---|---|---|---|---|---|---|---|---|---|---|---|---|---|---|---|---|---|---|---|---|---|---|---|---|---|---|---|
| Ground | H | A | H | A | H | A | H | A | H | A | A | H | H | A | H | A | H | A | H | A | H | A | H | A | H | H | A | A | H | A |
| Result | L | W | L | W | W | D | W | D | W | W | L | W | D | D | L | D | D | D | D | W | W | W | W | D | L | W | W | L | W | W |
| Position | 12 | 6 | 10 | 8 | 4 | 5 | 3 | 3 | 3 | 2 | 4 | 3 | 3 | 3 | 4 | 4 | 4 | 4 | 4 | 3 | 3 | 2 | 2 | 2 | 2 | 2 | 2 | 2 | 2 | 2 |

Source: Competitive matches
A = Away; H = Home; W = Win; D = Draw; L = Loss; P = Postponed; = Leader, 1983–84 European Cup; = Qualification to 1983–84 UEFA Cup; = Relegation to 1983-84 Serie B; R = 1983-84 UEFA Cup Winners' Cup

==== Matches ====
| 12 September 1982 1 | Sampdoria | 1–0 | Juventus | Genoa |
| | Ferroni 67' | | | Stadium: Stadio Luigi Ferraris; Referee: Mattei (Macerata) |

| 19 September 1982 2 | Juventus | 2–0 | Cesena | Turin |
| | Bettega 47'; Platini 62' | | | Stadium: Comunale; Referee: Benedetti (Rome) |

| 26 September 1982 3 | Hellas Verona | 2–1 | Juventus | Verona |
| | Fanna 63'; Tricella 89' | | 90' Rossi | Stadium: Stadio Marcantonio Bentegodi; Referee: Casarin (Milan) |

| 3 October 1982 4 | Juventus | 3–0 | Napoli | Turin |
| | Rossi 17'; Boniek 45', 51' | | | Stadium: Comunale; Referee: Longhi (Rome) |

| 10 October 1982 5 | Fiorentina | 0–1 | Juventus | Florence |
| | | | 54' Brio | Stadium: Comunale; Referee: Menegali (Rome) |

| 17 October 1982 6 | Udinese | 0–0 | Juventus | Udine |
| | | | | Stadium: Friuli; Referee: Bergamo (Livorno) |

| 24 October 1982 7 | Juventus | 2–1 | Roma | Turin |
| | Platini 49'; Scirea 56' | | 5' Chierico | Stadium: Comunale; Referee: D'Elia (Salerno) |

| 31 October 1982 8 | Avellino | 1–1 | Juventus | Avellino |
| | Di Somma 70' | | 56' Scirea | Stadium: Partenio; Referee: Lo Bello (Siracusa) |

| 7 November 1982 9 | Juventus | 3–2 | Pisa | Turin |
| | Platini 17'; Rossi 21' (pen.); Bettega 38' | | 33' Berggreen; 61' Ugolotti | Stadium: Comunale; Referee: Paparesta (Bari) |

| 21 November 1982 10 | Juventus | 1–0 | Torino | Turin |
| | Platini 35' | | | Stadium: Comunale; Referee: Casarin |

| 28 November 1982 11 | Ascoli | 2–0 | Juventus | Ascoli Piceno |
| | Novellino 25', 45' | | | Stadium: Cino e Lillo Del Duca; Referee: Benedetti |

| 12 December 1982 12 | Juventus | 3–1 | Catanzaro | Turin |
| | Marocchino 40'; Tardelli 48', 60' | | 34' Cuttone | Stadium: Comunale; Referee: Barbaresco |

| 19 December 1982 13 | Internazionale | 0–0 | Juventus | Milan |
| | | | | Stadium: Giuseppe Meazza; Referee: Longhi |

| 2 January 1983 14 | Juventus | 1–1 | Cagliari | Turin |
| | Tardelli 18' | | 57' Piras | Stadium: Comunale; Referee: Menegali |

| 9 January 1983 15 | Genoa | 1–0 | Juventus | Genoa |
| | Scirea 37' (o.g.) | | | Stadium: Stadio Luigi Ferraris; Referee: Redini (Pisa) |

| 16 January 1983 16 | Juventus | 1–1 | Sampdoria | Turin |
| | Bettega 85' | | 86' Scanziani | Stadium: Comunale; Referee: Bergamo (Livorno) |

| 23 January 1983 17 | Cesena | 2–2 | Juventus | Cesena |
| | Schachner 17', 27' | | 29' Brio; 61' Bettega | Stadium: Stadio Dino Manuzzi; Referee: Mattei (Macerata) |

| 30 January 1983 18 | Juventus | 0–0 | Hellas Verona | Turin |
| | | | | Stadium: Comunale; Referee: Lo Bello (Siracusa) |

| 6 February 1983 19 | Napoli | 0–0 | Juventus | Naples |
| | | | | Stadium: Stadio San Paolo; Referee: Bergamo (Livorno) |

| 20 February 1983 20 | Juventus | 3–0 | Fiorentina | Turin |
| | Bettega 19'; Ferroni 39' (o.g.); Rossi 74' | | | Stadium: Comunale; Referee: D'Elia (Salerno) |

| 27 February 1983 21 | Juventus | 4–0 | Udinese | Turin |
| | Platini 9', 63'; Boniek 80'; Tardelli 87' | | | Stadium: Comunale; Referee: Pieri (Genoa) |

| 6 March 1983 22 | Roma | 1–2 | Juventus | Rome |
| | Falcão 62' | | 83' Platini; 86' Brio | Stadium: Stadio Olimpico; Referee: Barbaresco (Cormons) |

| 13 March 1983 23 | Juventus | 4–1 | Avellino | Turin |
| | Scirea 13'; Boniek 64'; Platini 70', 87' | | 66' Vignola | Stadium: Comunale; Referee: Ballerini (La Spezia) |

| 20 March 1983 24 | Pisa | 0–0 | Juventus | Pisa |
| | | | | Stadium: Stadio Arena Garibaldi; Referee: D'Elia (Salerno) |

| 27 March 1983 25 | Torino | 3–2 | Juventus | Turin |
| | Dossena 70'; Bonesso 72'; Torrisi 75' | | 15' Rossi; 65' Platini | Stadium: Comunale; Referee: Lo Bello (Siracusa) |

| 10 April 1983 26 | Juventus | 5–0 | Ascoli | Turin |
| | Bettega 7'; Rossi 26' (pen.), 68'; Tardelli 34'; Platini 72' | | | Stadium: Comunale; Referee: Ballerini (La Spezia) |

| 24 April 1983 27 | Catanzaro | 1–2 | Juventus | Catanzaro |
| | De Agostini 30' | | 42' (pen.), 66' Platini | Stadium: Comunale; Referee: Redini (Pisa) |

| 1 May 1983 28 | Juventus | 3–3 | Inter Milan | Turin |
| | Platini 44', 69'; Bettega 77' | | 27' Altobelli; 37' Oriali; 55' Müller | Stadium: Comunale; Referee: Barbaresco (Cormons) |
Note: Italian Court awarded Match to Internazionale (0–2)

| 8 May 1983 29 | Cagliari | 1–2 | Juventus | Cagliari |
| | Piras 42' | | 54' Boniek; 68' Platini | Stadium: Stadio Sant'Elia; Referee: Bergamo (Livorno) |

| 15 May 1983 30 | Juventus | 4–2 | Genoa | Turin |
| | Gentile 27' (o.g.); Platini 30', 56'; Cabrini 86' | | 8' Benedetti; 64' Briaschi | Stadium: Comunale; Referee: Facchin (Udine) |

==== Goalscorers ====
- (France) Michel Platini 16
- (Italy) Paolo Rossi 7
- (Italy) Roberto Bettega 6
- (Poland) Zbigniew Boniek 5
- (Italy) Marco Tardelli 5
- (Italy) Sergio Brio 3
- (Italy) Gaetano Scirea 3
- (Italy) Antonio Cabrini 1
- (Italy) Domenico Marocchino 1

=== Coppa Italia ===
First round

| 18 August 1982 1 | Catania | 1–1 | Juventus | Catania |
| | Mastropasqua 1' | | 52' Marocchino | Stadium: Stadio Cibali; Referee: Redini |

| 22 August 1982 2 | Juventus | 2–1 | Pescara | Turin |
| | Platini 7'; Bettega 61' | | 90' (o.g.) Scirea | Stadium: Comunale; Referee: Lanese |

| 29 August 1982 3 | Genoa | 3–4 | Juventus | Genoa |
| | Briaschi 17'; Iachini 58' (pen.); Russo 73' | | 15' Platini; 25' Scirea; 51', 63' Rossi | Stadium: Stadio Luigi Ferraris; Referee: Menegali |

| 1 September 1982 4 | Juventus | 2–1 | Milan | Turin |
| | Rossi 21'; Rossi 68' | | 72' Jordan | Stadium: Comunale; Referee: Bergamo |

| 5 September 1982 5 | Padova | 1–1 | Juventus | Padua |
| | Pezzato 80' | | 54' Boniek | Stadium: Stadio Silvio Appiani; Referee: Paparesta |

Eightfinals

| 9 February 1983 | Juventus | 1–0 | Bari | Turin |
| | Platini 75' (pen.) | | | Stadium: Comunale; Referee: Bianciardi |

| 23 February 1983 | Bari | 1–1 | Juventus | Bari |
| | De Martino 21' | | 89' Platini | Stadium: Stadio della Vittoria; Referee: Lanese |

Quarter-finals

| 1 June 1983 | Juventus | 3–0 | Roma | Turin |
| | Cabrini 41'; Platini 70'; Boniek 88' | | | Stadium: Comunale; Referee: D'Elia |

| 4 June 1983 | Roma | 0–2 | Juventus | Rome |
| | | | 49' Tardelli; 53' Boniek | Stadium: Stadio Olimpico; Referee: Lo Bello |

Semi-finals

| 11 June 1983 | Juventus | 2–1 | Internazionale | Turin |
| | Baresi 5' (o.g.); Galderisi 8' | | 63' Bini | Stadium: Comunale; Referee: Menegali |

| 15 June 1983 | Internazionale | 0–0 | Juventus | Milan |
| | | | | Stadium: Stadio Giuseppe Meazza; Referee: Pieri |

==== Final ====
| 19 June 1983 | Hellas Verona | 2–0 | Juventus | Verona |
| | Penzo 44'; Volpati 51' | | | Stadium: Stadio Marcantonio Bentegodi; Referee: Lo Bello |

| 22 June 1983 | Juventus | 3–0 (3–2 agg.) | Hellas Verona | Turin |
| | Rossi 8'; Platini 81'; Platini 119' | | | Stadium: Comunale; Referee: Longhi |

=== European Cup ===
==== First round ====
| 15 September 1982 1 | Hvidovre (Denmark) | 1–4 | (Italy) Juventus | Copenhagen, Denmark |
| | Jensen 78' | | Platini 44'; Rossi 54'; Brio 60'; Cabrini 73' |

| 29 September 1982 2 | Juventus (Italy) | 3–3 (7–4 agg.) | (Denmark) Hvidovre | Turin, Italy |
| | Boniek 34'; Platini 64'; Rossi 84' | | Petersen 78', 83'; Hansen 86' | Stadium: Stadio Olimpico di Torino |

==== Second round ====
| 20 October 1982 1 | Standard Liège (Belgium) | 1–1 | (Italy) Juventus | Liège, Belgium |
| | Tahamata 68' (pen.) | | Tardelli 7' |

| 3 November 1982 2 | Juventus (Italy) | 2–0 (3–1 agg.) | (Belgium) Standard Liège | Turin, Italy |
| | Rossi 13', 28' | | | Stadium: Stadio Olimpico di Torino |

==== Quarter-finals ====
| 2 March 1983 1 | Aston Villa (England) | 1–2 | (Italy) Juventus | Birmingham, England |
| | Cowans 53' | | Rossi 1'; Boniek 82' | Stadium: Villa Park; Attendance: 45,531; Referee: (West Germany) Walter Eschweiler |

| 16 March 1983 2 | Juventus (Italy) | 3–1 (5–2 agg.) | (England) Aston Villa | Turin, Italy |
| | Platini 14', 68'; Tardelli 27' | | Withe 81' | Stadium: Stadio Olimpico di Torino |

==== Semi-finals ====
| 6 April 1983 1 | Juventus (Italy) | 2–0 | (Poland) Widzew Łódź | Turin, Italy |
| | Grębosz 8' (o.g.); Bettega 59' | | | Stadium: Stadio Olimpico di Torino |

| 20 April 1983 2 | Widzew Łódź (Poland) | 2–2 (2–4 agg.) | (Italy) Juventus | Łódź, Poland |
| | Surlit 54', 81' | | Rossi 32'; Platini 82' (pen.) | Stadium: Stadion LKS; Attendance: 65,000; Referee: (Netherlands) Charles Corver |

==== Final ====
| 25 May 1983 | Hamburg (West Germany) | 1–0 | (Italy) Juventus | Athens, Greece |
| 21:15 EEST | Magath 9' | Report | | Stadium: Olympic Stadium; Attendance: 73,500; Referee: (Romania) Nicolae Rainea |

== Statistics ==
=== Players statistics ===
| No. | Pos | Nat | Player | Total | | Serie A | | Coppa Italia | | European Cup | |
| No. | Pos | Nat | Player | Apps | Goals | Apps | Goals | Apps | Goals | Apps | Goals |
|---|---|---|---|---|---|---|---|---|---|---|---|
| | GK | (Italy) ITA | Zoff | 45 | -42 | 30 | -24 | 6 | -8 | 9 | -10 |
| | DF | (Italy) ITA | Gentile | 47 | 0 | 28 | 0 | 10 | 0 | 9 | 0 |
| | DF | (Italy) ITA | Brio | 45 | 4 | 24 | 3 | 13 | 0 | 8 | 1 |
| | DF | (Italy) ITA | Scirea | 51 | 4 | 30 | 3 | 12 | 1 | 9 | 0 |
| | DF | (Italy) ITA | Cabrini | 41 | 3 | 25 | 1 | 8 | 1 | 8 | 1 |
| | MF | (Italy) ITA | Tardelli | 44 | 8 | 25+1 | 5 | 10 | 1 | 8 | 2 |
| | MF | (San Marino) SMR | Bonini | 49 | 0 | 21+6 | 0 | 13 | 0 | 9 | 0 |
| | MF | (France) FRA | Platini | 52 | 28 | 30 | 16 | 13 | 7 | 9 | 5 |
| | FW | (Poland) POL | Boniek | 49 | 10 | 28 | 5 | 12 | 3 | 9 | 2 |
| | FW | (Italy) ITA | Rossi | 43 | 18 | 23 | 7 | 11 | 5 | 9 | 6 |
| | FW | (Italy) ITA | Bettega | 40 | 8 | 23+4 | 6 | 7 | 1 | 6 | 1 |
| | GK | (Italy) ITA | Galderisi | 14 | 1 | 2+5 | 0 | 6 | 1 | 1 | 0 |
| | MF | (Italy) ITA | Furino | 36 | 0 | 17+4 | 0 | 10 | 0 | 5 | 0 |
| | MF | (Italy) ITA | Marocchino | 38 | 2 | 14+9 | 1 | 9 | 1 | 6 | 0 |
| | MF | (Italy) ITA | Prandelli | 27 | 0 | 9+6 | 0 | 9 | 0 | 3 | 0 |
| | DF | (Italy) ITA | Storgato | 13 | 0 | 1+5 | 0 | 6 | 0 | 1 | 0 |
| | GK | (Italy) ITA | Bodini | 7 | -3 | 0 | 0 | 7 | -3 | | |
| | MF | (Italy) ITA | Koetting | 2 | 0 | 0+1 | 0 | 1 | 0 | | |
| | DF | (Italy) ITA | Osti | 5 | 0 | 0 | 0 | 5 | 0 | | |

- Source: http://calcio-seriea.net/presenze/1982/877/
