= 1979–80 Juventus FC season =

Italian football club season

Juventus
1979–80 season
- Owner: Agnelli family
- President: Giampiero Boniperti
- Head Coach: Giovanni Trapattoni
- Stadium: Comunale
- Serie A: 2nd
- Coppa Italia: Semi-final
- Cup Winners' Cup: Semi-final
- Top goalscorer: Roberto Bettega (16)
Home colours	Away colours
- All statistics correct as of 11 May 1980.

Juventus Football Club finished the season second in Serie A. They also reached the semi-finals of Coppa Italia and the Cup Winners' Cup. It was the only season without trophies for Giovanni Trapattoni.

== Squad ==
Note: Flags indicate national team as defined under FIFA eligibility rules; some limited exceptions apply. Players may hold more than one non-FIFA nationality.

Pos.	Nation	Player
GK	ITA	Dino Zoff
GK	ITA	Luciano Bodini
DF	ITA	Gaetano Scirea
DF	ITA	Claudio Gentile
DF	ITA	Antonio Cabrini
DF	ITA	Sergio Brio
DF	ITA	Fabio Marangon
MF	ITA	Franco Causio
MF	ITA	Antonello Cuccureddu

Pos.	Nation	Player
MF	ITA	Giuseppe Furino (Captain)
MF	ITA	Domenico Marocchino
MF	ITA	Pietro Fanna
MF	ITA	Marco Tardelli
MF	ITA	Cesare Prandelli
MF	ITA	Roberto Tavola
MF	ITA	Vinicio Verza
MF	ITA	Gabriele Pin
FW	ITA	Roberto Bettega
FW	ITA	Pietro Paolo Virdis

=== Transfers ===
In
Pos.	Name	from	Type
MF	Domenico Marocchino	Atalanta BC	
MF	Cesare Prandelli	Atalanta BC	
MF	Roberto Tavola	Atalanta BC	
GK	Luciano Bodini	Atalanta BC	
GK	Maurizio Baratella		

Out
Pos.	Name	To	Type
FW	Roberto Boninsegna	Hellas Verona	
MF	Romeo Benetti	A.S. Roma	
GK	Giancarlo Alessandrelli	Atalanta BC	

== Competitions ==
=== Serie A ===
==== League table ====
Pos	Team	Pld	W	D	L	GF	GA	GD	Pts	Qualification or relegation
1	Inter (C)	30	14	13	3	44	25	+19	41	Qualification to European Cup
2	Juventus	30	16	6	8	42	25	+17	38	Qualification to UEFA Cup
3	Torino (Note: A.C. Milan and S.S. Lazio placed in the last position and relegated to Serie B by FIGC because of the Totonero 1980 scandal. Torino qualified to UEFA Cup instead of Milan.)	30	11	13	6	26	15	+11	35	Qualification to UEFA Cup
4	Ascoli	30	11	12	7	35	28	+7	34	
5	Fiorentina	30	11	11	8	33	27	+6	33	

Source: RSSSF.com
Rules for classification: 1) Points; 2) Head-to-head points; 3) Head-to-head goal difference; 4) Goal difference; 5) Goals scored; 6) Draw. (Note: Head-to-head record is used only after all the matches between the teams in question have been played).
Goal difference is used in case of equal points.
(C) Champions

==== Results by round ====
Round	1	2	3	4	5	6	7	8	9	10	11	12	13	14	15	16	17	18	19	20	21	22	23	24	25	26	27	28	29	30
Ground	H	A	H	A	H	A	H	A	A	H	A	H	A	H	A	A	H	A	H	A	H	A	H	H	A	H	A	H	A	H
Result	D	W	W	L	D	W	W	L	L	W	L	W	L	L	L	D	W	W	W	W	D	D	D	W	L	W	W	W	W	W
Position	4	3	1	3	3	2	2	3	5	2	6	3	5	8	10	10	7	5	4	2	2	3	3	2	3	3	2	2	2	2

Source: Competitive matches
A = Away; H = Home; W = Win; D = Draw; L = Loss; P = Postponed; = Leader, 1980–81 European Cup; = 1980–81 UEFA Cup; = 1980-81 Serie B; R = 1980-81 UEFA Cup Winners' Cup

==== Matches ====
16 September 1979 1	Juventus	1–1	Bologna	Turin
	Causio 75' (pen.)		Savoldi 63' (pen.)	Stadium: Comunale

23 September 1979 2	Catanzaro	0–1	Juventus	Catanzaro
			Bettega 81'

30 September 1979 3	Juventus	3–0	Pescara	Turin
	Bettega 45, 87'; Verza 50'			Stadium: Comunale

7 October 1979 4	Milan	2–1	Juventus	Milan
	Novellino 7'; Antonelli 44'		Tardelli 46'	Stadium: San Siro

14 October 1979 5	Juventus	1–1	Udinese	Turin
	Tardelli 14'		Ulivieri 26'	Stadium: Comunale

21 October 1979 6	Torino	1–2	Juventus	Turin
	Graziani 30'		Bettega 34'; Tardelli 68'	Stadium: Comunale

28 October 1979 7	Juventus	1–0	Napoli	Turin
	Scirea 13'			Stadium: Comunale

4 November 1979 8	Lazio	1–0	Juventus	Rome
	Verza 11' (o.g.)			Stadium: Olimpico

11 November 1979 9	Internazionale	4–0	Juventus	Milan
	Altobelli 48', 50' (pen.), 79'; Muraro 74'			Stadium: Giuseppe Meazza

25 November 1979 10	Juventus	1–0	Cagliari	Turin
	Causio 75'			Stadium: Comunale

2 December 1979 11	Avellino	1–0	Juventus	Avellino
	De Ponti 42' (pen.)			Stadium: Partenio

9 December 1979 12	Juventus	2–0	Roma	Turin
	Bettega 5'; Marocchino 36'			Stadium: Comunale

16 December 1979 13	Perugia	1–0	Juventus	Perugia
	Rossi 19'

30 December 1979 14	Juventus	2–3	Ascoli	Turin
	Tavola 17'; Cabrini 81'		Anastasi 8'; Cuccureddu 34' (o.g.); Bellotto 67'	Stadium: Comunale

6 January 1980 15	Fiorentina	2–1	Juventus	Florence
	Sacchetti 19'; Tandi 29'		Bettega 39'	Stadium: Comunale

13 January 1980 16	Bologna	1–1	Juventus	Bologna
	Brio 69' (o.g.)		Causio 55'	Stadium: Renato Dall'Ara

20 January 1980 17	Juventus	1–0	Catanzaro	Turin
	Causio 18'			Stadium: Comunale

27 January 1980 18	Pescara	0–2	Juventus	Pescara
			Virdis 14'; Brio 89'

3 February 1980 19	Juventus	2–1	Milan	Turin
	Maldera 66' (o.g.); Bettega 78'		De Vecchi 10'	Stadium: Comunale

10 February 1980 20	Udinese	1–3	Juventus	Udine
	Ulivieri 85'		Bettega 29'; Marocchino 64'; Bettega 69'	Stadium: Friuli

24 February 1980 21	Juventus	0–0	Torino	Turin
				Stadium: Comunale

2 March 1980 22	Napoli	0–0	Juventus	Naples
				Stadium: San Paolo

9 March 1980 23	Juventus	0–0	Lazio	Turin
				Stadium: Comunale

23 March 1980 24	Juventus	2–0	Internazionale	Turin
	Bettega 32'; Fanna 79'			Stadium: Comunale

30 March 1980 25	Cagliari	2–1	Juventus	Cagliari
	Selvaggi 80'; Bellini 89'		Bettega 44'	Stadium: Sant'Elia

5 April 1980 26	Juventus	2–0	Avellino	Turin
	Tardelli 62'; Bettega 73'			Stadium: Comunale

13 April 1980 27	Roma	1–3	Juventus	Rome
	Pruzzo 36'		Gentile 2'; Scirea 20'; Bettega 77'	Stadium: Olimpico

27 April 1980 28	Juventus	3–0	Perugia	Turin
	Fanna 46'; Tavola 58'; Bettega 66' (pen.)			Stadium: Comunale

4 May 1980 29	Ascoli	2–3	Juventus	Ascoli Piceno
	Bellotto 48'; Cuccureddu 72' (o.g.)		Scirea 51'; Bettega 83, 85'	Stadium: Cino e Lillo Del Duca

11 May 1980 30	Juventus	3–0	Fiorentina	Turin
	Fanna 7'; Gentile 52'; Bettega 60' (pen.)			Stadium: Comunale

==== Top Scorers ====
- (Italy) Roberto Bettega 16
- (Italy) Franco Causio 4
- (Italy) Gaetano Scirea 4
- (Italy) Pietro Fanna 3

=== Coppa Italia ===
First round
bye as defending Champions
Quarterfinals

28 November 1979	Inter Milan	1–2	Juventus	Milan
	Pancheri 60'		27' Prandelli; 76' (o.g.) Occhipinti	Stadium: Giuseppe Meazza

30 January 1980	Juventus	0–0 (2–1 agg.)	Inter Milan	Turin
				Stadium: Comunale

Semifinals

26 March 1980	Juventus	0–0	Torino	Turin
				Stadium: Comunale

30 April 1980	Torino	0–0 (4–2 p)	Juventus	Turin
				Stadium: Comunale

=== European Cup Winners' Cup ===
==== First Round ====
19 September 1979	Juventus (Italy)	2–0	(Hungary) Győri ETO	Turin
	Pozsgai 64' (o.g.); Cabrini 73' (pen.)

3 October 1979	Győri ETO (Hungary)	2–1	(Italy) Juventus	Győr
	Furino 4' (o.g.); Póczik 23'		Causio 52'

Juventus won 3–2 on aggregate.

==== Second Round ====
24 October 1979	Beroe Stara Zagora (Bulgaria)	1–0	(Italy) Juventus	Stara Zagora
	Stoyanov 80' (pen.)

7 November 1979	Juventus (Italy)	3–0 (a.e.t.)	(Bulgaria) Beroe Stara Zagora	Turin
	Scirea 8'; Causio 104'; Verza 111'

Juventus won 3–1 on aggregate.

==== Quarterfinals ====
5 March 1980	Rijeka (Socialist Federal Republic of Yugoslavia)	0–0	(Italy) Juventus	Rijeka

19 March 1980	Juventus (Italy)	2–0	(Socialist Federal Republic of Yugoslavia) Rijeka	Turin
	Causio 5'; Bettega 72'

Juventus won 2–0 on aggregate.

==== Semifinals ====
9 April 1980	Arsenal (England)	1–1	(Italy) Juventus	London
	Bettega 84' (o.g.)		11' Cabrini	Stadium: Highbury

23 April 1980	Juventus (Italy)	0–1	(England) Arsenal	Turin
			88' Vaessen	Stadium: Comunale
Note: Arsenal won 2–1 on aggregate.

== Statistics ==
=== Players statistics ===
No.	Pos	Nat	Player	Total		Serie A		Coppa		UEFA	
No.	Pos	Nat	Player	Apps	Goals	Apps	Goals	Apps	Goals	Apps	Goals
	GK	(Italy) ITA	Dino Zoff	38	-29	30	-25	4	-1	4	-3
	DF	(Italy) ITA	Gaetano Scirea	36	5	29	4	4	0	3	1
	DF	(Italy) ITA	Antonello Cuccureddu	33	0	26	0	3	0	4	0
	DF	(Italy) ITA	Sergio Brio	26	1	19+1	1	3	0	3	0
	DF	(Italy) ITA	Claudio Gentile	34	2	24+2	2	4	0	4	0
	DF	(Italy) ITA	Antonio Cabrini	32	2	24+2	1	3	0	3	1
	MF	(Italy) ITA	Franco Causio	34	5	26	4	4	0	4	1
	MF	(Italy) ITA	Giuseppe Furino	33	0	25	0	4	0	4	0
	MF	(Italy) ITA	Marco Tardelli	24	4	19	4	2	0	3	0
	FW	(Italy) ITA	Domenico Marocchino	29	2	21+2	2	3	0	3	0
	FW	(Italy) ITA	Roberto Bettega	36	17	28	16	4	0	4	1
	GK	(Italy) ITA	Luciano Bodini	0	0	0	-0	0	-0	0	-0
	MF	(Italy) ITA	Cesare Prandelli	22	1	16+2	0	2	1	2	0
	MF	(Italy) ITA	Pietro Fanna	28	3	13+9	3	3	0	3	0
	MF	(Italy) ITA	Roberto Tavola	18	2	13	2	3	0	2	0
	FW	(Italy) ITA	Vinicio Verza	14	2	9+2	1	2	1	1	0
	FW	(Italy) ITA	Pietro Paolo Virdis	16	1	7+5	1	3	0	1	0
	MF	(Italy) ITA	Gabriele Pin	0	0	0	0				
	GK	(Italy) ITA	Maurizio Baratella	0	0	0	-0				
	DF	(Italy) ITA	Francesco Morini	0	0	0	0				

- Source: http://calcio-seriea.net/presenze/1979/828/
