= Babsk =

- Village
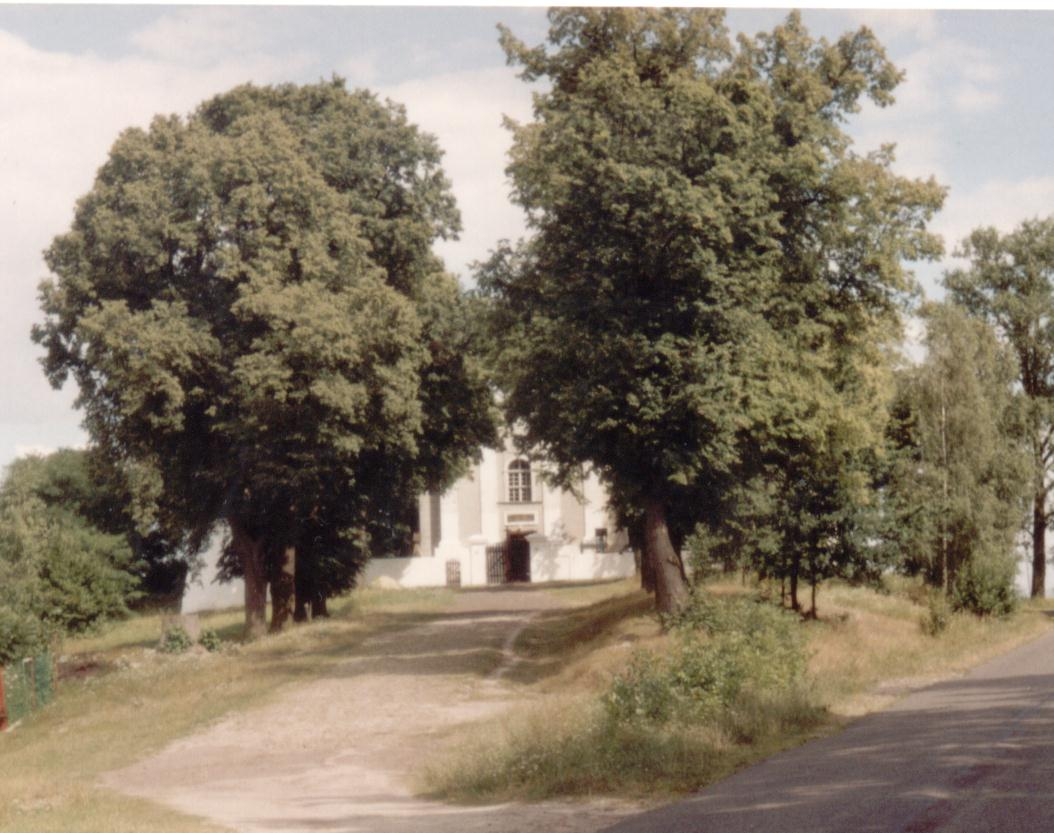
- Church in Babsk (built 1806)

- Location within Poland
- Coordinates: 51°50′22″N 20°21′4″E
- Country: Poland
- Voivodeship: Łódź
- County: Rawa
- Gmina: Biała Rawska
- Population (2005): 690
- Postal code: 96-205
- Area code: +48 46

Babsk [bapsk] is a village in the administrative district of Gmina Biała Rawska, within Rawa County, Łódź Voivodeship, in central Poland.

In 1989, the Juventus footballer Gaetano Scirea died in a car accident in this village.
