= Sergio Brio =

Italian footballer

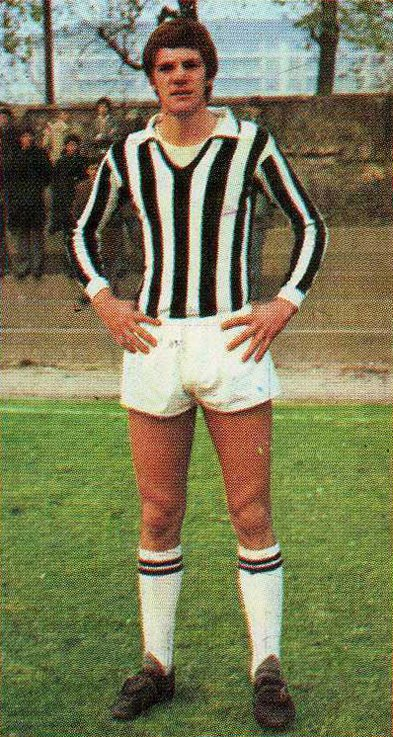
- Brio with Juventus in 1974

Personal information
- Full name: Sergio Brio
- Date of birth: 19 August 1956 (age 70)
- Place of birth: Lecce, Italy
- Height: 1.90 m (6 ft 3 in)
- Position: Centre-back

Youth career
- Lecce

Senior career*
Years	Team	Apps	(Gls)
1973–1974	Lecce	1	(0)
1974–1990	Juventus	243	(16)
1975–1978	→ Pistoiese (loan)	96	(5)
Total		340	(21)

Managerial career
- 2003–2004: Mons
- * Club domestic league appearances and goals

Sergio Brio (born 19 August 1956) is an Italian former footballer, in the role of centre back, who played for Juventus from the mid 1970s to the ending 1980s having won, among others, four Serie A titles and becoming one of the only six footballers to have won all UEFA club competitions.

== Club career ==
Brio was born in Lecce, Apulia. He began his career with his local club, U.S. Lecce, during the 1973–74 season, before moving to Juventus for the 1974–75 season, although he did not make a single appearance with the club that season. He was later sent on loan to Pistoiese from 1975 to 1978, before returning to Juventus. His first season with the Turin club was the 1978–79 season, and he made his Serie A debut with Juventus on 18 March 1979, as they defeated Napoli 1–0. He remained with the club until the 1989–90 season, captaining the club from 1989 to 1990, when he retired from professional football. Overall, he made 378 appearances for Juventus in all competitions, scoring 24 goals, 16 of which came in Serie A over 243 appearances. Brio played for Juventus during one the club's most successful periods, forming a formidable defence alongside Dino Zoff, Gaetano Scirea, Claudio Gentile, and Antonio Cabrini, winning four Serie A titles, three Italian Cups, a European Cup, a Cup Winners' Cup, an UEFA Cup, a European Super Cup, and an Intercontinental Cup, under managers Giovanni Trapattoni, and subsequently Dino Zoff.

Brio is one of only six players in European football history – with Antonio Cabrini, Gaetano Scirea, Stefano Tacconi, Danny Blind and Arnold Mühren – to have won all international club competitions.

== International career ==
Despite his success at club level, Brio, along with his Juventus defensive team-mate Luciano Favero, never made an appearance for the Italy national side, as manager Enzo Bearzot preferred Fulvio Collovati, for his elegant style of play, and Pietro Vierchowod, for his speed and adeptness at the zonal marking system, in his position. He was a member of the Italy Olympic squad under his former team-mate Dino Zoff during the late 80s.

== Style of play ==
An atypical continental stopper, Brio was not particularly technically gifted, although he was known for his strength, tenacity, and physicality, as well as his ability in the air, which often made him a goal threat on set pieces; this also allowed him to play as a centre-forward earlier in his career. In addition to his athletic ability, he was also known for his concentration, and was an excellent man-marker, and reader of the game. His aggressive and physical playing style led him to be involved in frequent duels on the pitch with rival players such as former Roma forward Roberto Pruzzo and former Liverpool forward Ian Rush (who later became his teammate) during the 1980s. His qualities made him more suited to a man-marking defensive system rather than a zonal marking system. He was often likened to fellow stopper Francesco Morini throughout his career, whose role he inherited at Juventus; both defenders are considered two of the club's best players ever in their position. Despite his hard-nosed reputation as a footballer, he was known for his lively and humorous character off the pitch.

== Coaching career ==
Following his retirement, he worked as an assistant coach with Juventus under Giovanni Trapattoni, who managed to win the 1992–93 UEFA Cup during his second stint with the club. He was head coach of Belgian club R.A.E.C. Mons from 2003 to 2004.

== Honours ==
Juventus

- Serie A: 1980–81, 1981–82, 1983–84, 1985–86
- Coppa Italia: 1978–79, 1982–83, 1989–90
- Intercontinental Cup: 1985
- European Cup: 1984–85
- European Cup: Runner-up: 1982–83
- UEFA Cup Winners' Cup: 1983–84
- UEFA Cup: 1989–90
- European Super Cup: 1984

Individual

- Juventus FC Hall of Fame: 2025

== See also ==
- List of players to have won all international club competitions
- List of players to have won the three main European club competitions
