= Carlo Osti =

Italian footballer (born 1958)

Personal information
- Date of birth: 20 January 1958 (age 68)
- Place of birth: Vittorio Veneto, Italy
- Height: 1.78 m (5 ft 10 in)
- Position: Defender

Team information
- Current team: Palermo (sporting director)

Senior career*
Years	Team	Apps	(Gls)
1973–1976	Union CSV	54	(5)
1976–1978	Udinese	15	(0)
1978–1979	Atalanta	22	(0)
1979–1980	Udinese	24	(9)
1980–1982	Juventus	12	(0)
1982–1984	Avellino	52	(1)
1984–1988	Atalanta	72	(1)
1988–1990	Piacenza	53	(0)
1990–1991	Virescit Bergamo	27	(0)
- * Club domestic league appearances and goals

Carlo Osti (born 20 January 1958) is an Italian former professional footballer who played as a defender. He is the sporting director of Palermo.

== Playing career ==
A defender, Osti had a playing career that saw him playing at Serie A level with Atalanta, Juventus, Udinese and Avellino.

== Managerial career ==
After retirement, he became a football director. At Serie A level, he served as sporting director for Lazio, Atalanta, Lecce and, most importantly, Sampdoria, where he worked for nearly eleven years (from December 2012 to June 2023).

On 3 January 2025, Osti took over as the new sporting director of Palermo.

== Honours ==
Juventus

- Serie A champion: 1980–81, 1981–82
