= Domenico Marocchino =

Italian footballer and manager (born 1957)

Personal information
- Date of birth: 5 May 1957 (age 69)
- Place of birth: Vercelli, Italy
- Height: 1.86 m (6 ft 1 in)
- Position: Midfielder

Senior career*
Years	Team	Apps	(Gls)
1975–1976	Juventus	0	(0)
1976–1977	Juniorcasale	35	(2)
1977–1978	Cremonese	34	(2)
1978–1979	Atalanta	18	(1)
1979–1983	Juventus	99	(9)
1983–1984	Sampdoria	14	(1)
1984–1987	Bologna	70	(4)
1987–1988	Casale	3	(0)
Total		273	(19)

International career
1981	Italy	1	(0)
- * Club domestic league appearances and goals

Domenico Marocchino (Italian pronunciation: [doˈmeːniko marokˈkiːno]; born 5 May 1957) is a retired Italian professional football player and manager, who played as a midfielder.

== Club career ==
A former Juventus youth product, Marocchino played in the lower divisions for Juniorcasale and Cremonese, making 35 appearances in Serie C and 35 more in Serie B respectively, before making his Serie A debut with Atalanta, on 17 December 1978, in a 0–0 draw against Fiorentina.

In the summer of 1979, he returned to Juventus, and remained at the club for four seasons, winning two consecutive Serie A titles in 1981 and 1982, and a Coppa Italia in 1983. His best season with the club was during the 1981–82 season, when he was given more first team opportunities following an injury to regular starter Roberto Bettega, and helped Juventus to the league title with his consistent and decisive performances. The arrival of Michel Platini and Zbigniew Boniek the following season, coupled with Marocchino's physical decline, saw him struggle to find space in the team, and he left the club at the end of the season.

Marocchino later played for Sampdoria in Serie A, and Bologna in Serie B, before returning to play for Casale in the lower divisions, where he ended his career in 1988. In total, he made 131 appearances in Serie A throughout his career, scoring 11 goals, and 104 appearances in Serie B, scoring 6 goals.

== International career ==
Marocchino made his only international appearance for the Italy national football team on 5 December 1981, in a 1–0 home win over Luxembourg in a 1982 FIFA World Cup Qualifying match, held in Naples.

== Style of play ==
Regarded as a talented prospect in his youth, Marocchino, however struggled to live up to his potential in his later career, due to his mentality and inconsistency at the top level. He was capable of playing in several midfield positions, and was used as a winger, as an attacking midfielder, or even as a second striker; his Juventus manager Giovanni Trapattoni often struggled to find a suitable position for him, however, as he deemed him to be inconsistent, and felt his defensive work-rate was too low for him to be deployed as a wide midfielder, but that he was too unreliable in front of goal to be used in a more offensive role. In spite of his tall, large build, Marocchino possessed excellent technique, control, and dribbling skills, which along with his physique, enabled him to defend the ball under pressure, and beat opponents, both in one on one situations or during individual runs. He was also a good passer, who was known for his ability to play the ball on the ground.

== Honours ==
Juventus

- Serie A champion: 1980–81, 1981–82
- Coppa Italia winner: 1982–83
- UEFA Champions League Runner-up: 1982–83
