= Enzo Barbaresco =

Italian football referee

Enzo Barbaresco (born 24 April 1937) is a former football referee from Italy. He is known for having officiated the 1984 Summer Olympics in Los Angeles, handling the match between Cameroon and Canada.

Barbaresco is known to have served as a FIFA referee during the period from 1980 to 1984. He officiated in qualifying matches for the 1982 World Cup and Euro 1984.
