= Roberto Tavola =

Italian footballer

Personal information
- Date of birth: 7 August 1957 (age 69)
- Place of birth: Pescate, Italy
- Height: 1.75 m (5 ft 9 in)
- Position: Midfielder

Senior career*
| Years | Team | Apps | (Gls) |
| 1975–1979 | Atalanta | 113 | (6) |
| 1979–1983 | Juventus | 19 | (2) |
| 1980–1981 | → Cagliari (loan) | 18 | (1) |
| 1982–1983 | → Lazio (loan) | 20 | (0) |
| 1983–1984 | Reggina | 15 | (2) |
| 1984–1985 | Avellino | 0 | (0) |
| 1985–1986 | SPAL | 30 | (1) |
| 1986–1987 | Catanzaro | 30 | (3) |
| 1987–1988 | Ischia | 29 | (3) |
| 1988–1989 | Asti | | |
| 1989–1990 | Seo Borgaro Torinese | | |
- * Club domestic league appearances and goals

Roberto Tavola (born 7 August 1957) is an Italian former professional footballer who played as a midfielder.

== Honours ==
Juventus

- Serie A champion: 1981–82, 1983–84
