= Gaetano Scirea =

Italian footballer (1953–1989)

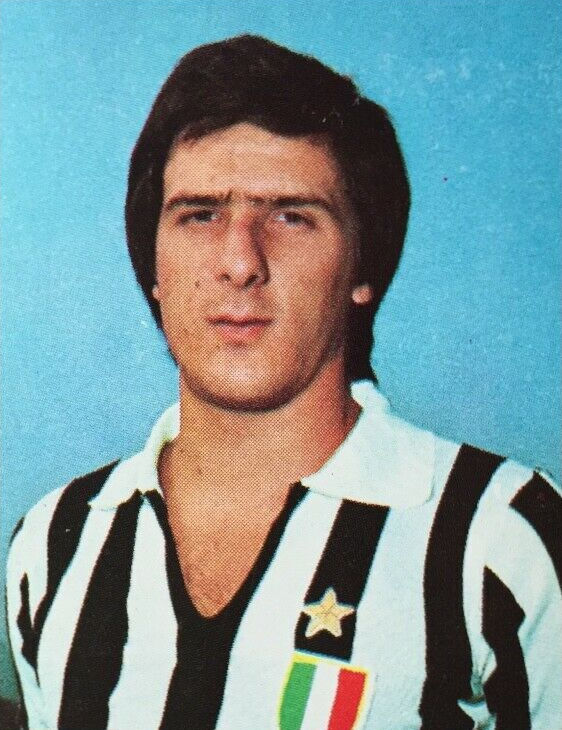
- Scirea with Juventus in 1975

Personal information
- Date of birth: 25 May 1953
- Place of birth: Cernusco sul Naviglio, Lombardy, Italy
- Date of death: 3 September 1989 (aged 36)
- Place of death: Babsk, Skierniewice, Poland
- Height: 1.78 m (5 ft 10 in)
- Position: Defender

Youth career
- 1970–1972: Atalanta

Senior career*
| Years | Team | Apps | (Gls) |
| 1972–1974 | Atalanta | 58 | (1) |
| 1974–1988 | Juventus | 377 | (24) |
| Total | | 435 | (25) |

International career
| 1975–1986 | Italy | 78 | (2) |
Medal record
Men's football
Representing Italy
FIFA World Cup
| Winner | 1982 Spain |
- * Club domestic league appearances and goals

Gaetano Scirea (Italian pronunciation: [ɡaeˈtaːno ʃʃiˈrɛːa]; 25 May 1953 – 3 September 1989) was an Italian professional footballer who is considered one of the greatest defenders in football history. He spent most of his career with Juventus.

Scirea is one of only six players in European football history to have won all international trophies for football clubs recognized by UEFA and FIFA. Scirea is also one of only nine players in the history of European football that won all three major UEFA football competitions, a feat he managed while playing with Juventus, the Italian club with which he spent the majority of his career, aside from two seasons with Atalanta. At international level, he played for the Italy national team for more than a decade, during which he was an undisputed member of Italy's defensive line-up, keeping Franco Baresi out of the national team for four years, until he retired in 1986. Scirea became a World Champion with the 1982 FIFA World Cup winning team, which defeated Brazil 3–2 in a decisive second round match and Germany 3–1 in the final; he also represented Italy in two more World Cups, finishing in fourth-place in 1978, and UEFA Euro 1980, where Italy once again managed a fourth-place finish.

== Club career ==
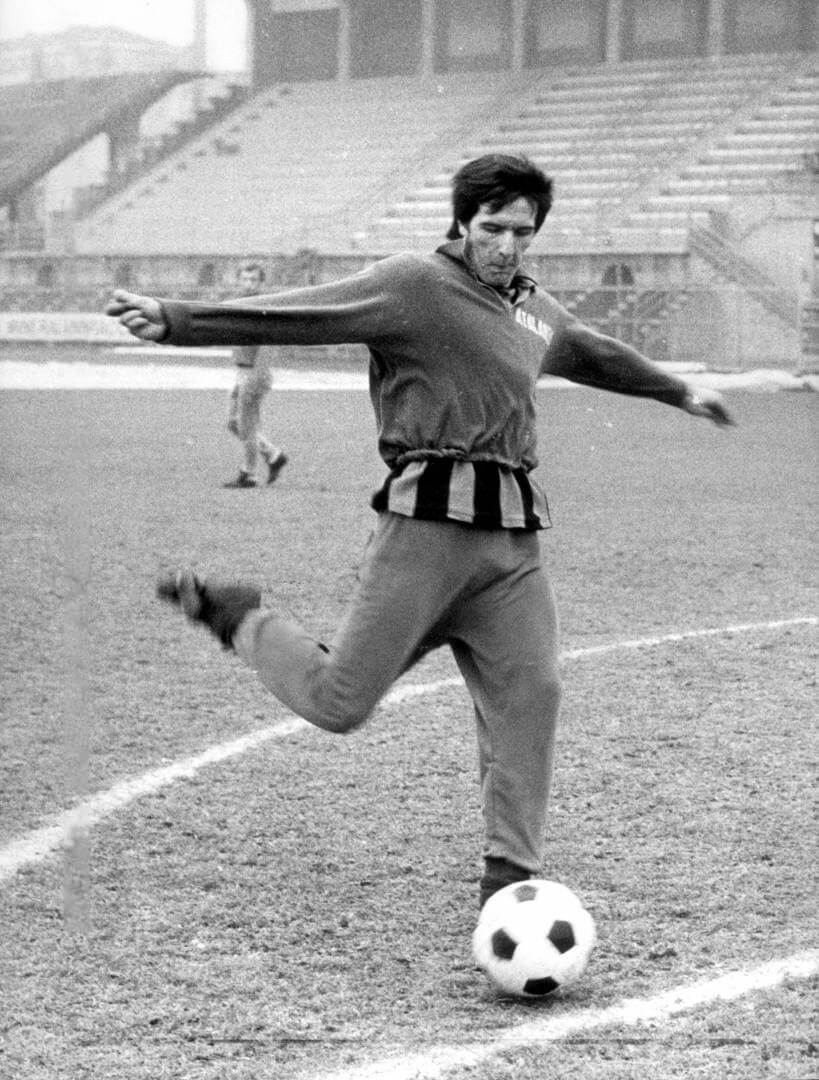
Scirea in training with Atalanta, early 1970s

Scirea was born at Cernusco sul Naviglio, in the province of Milan, but was of Sicilian origin.

Scirea made his Serie A debut for Atalanta against Cagliari on 24 September 1972. He remained with Atalanta for two seasons, before transferring to Juventus, with whom he would stay until the end of his playing career. In all, he made 397 appearances in Serie A, scoring 24 goals. Scirea saw great success with Juventus, playing alongside Antonio Cabrini, and the hard-hitting Claudio Gentile as well as goalkeeper Dino Zoff. He managed the impressive feat of winning every UEFA Club and domestic competition during his time at the club (seven Serie A titles, two Coppa Italias, one UEFA Cup, one Cup Winners' Cup, one European Cup, one UEFA Super Cup and one Intercontinental Cup).

He retired from club football at the end of the 1987–88 season. He took up the role of scout at Juventus, later working as a coach.

== International career ==
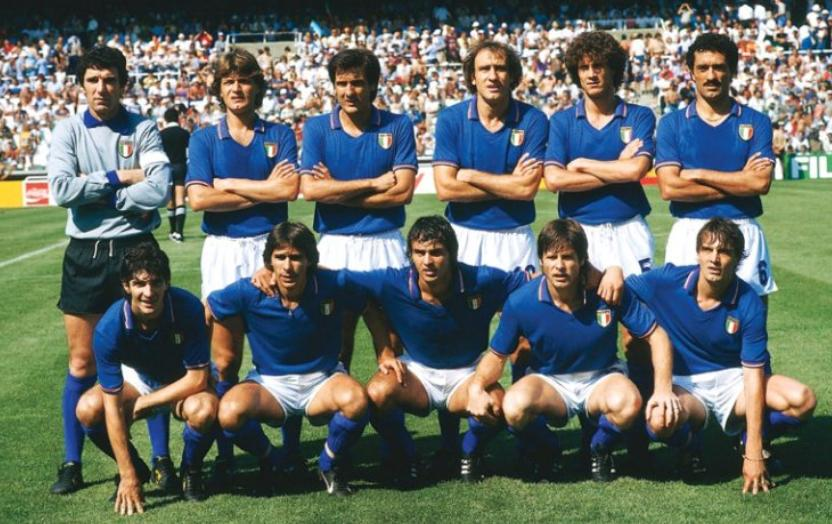
Scirea (standing, third from left) with Italy national team in the victorious 1982 World Cup

Scirea's debut for the Italy national team was on 30 December 1975, against Greece. He immediately became an irreplaceable pillar of the team managed by Enzo Bearzot, and played in three World Cups, and one European Championship on home soil in 1980, where Italy finished in fourth place after reaching the semi-final, and Scirea was named part of the team of the tournament.

Scirea, alongside clubmates Antonio Cabrini and Claudio Gentile, right-back Giuseppe Bergomi and goalkeeper Dino Zoff, formed the defensive backbone of perhaps the strongest Italian side of the post-war period as the Azzurri dominated international and club football during the late 1970s to early 80s; the back-line is considered one of the greatest defences of all time.

Scirea impressed in the 1978 World Cup where Italy finished in fourth place. At the 1982 World Cup, after a quiet start in the first round group stage, Italy beat Argentina and then Brazil in the second round, later overcoming Poland 2–0 in the semi-final. A 3–1 victory over West Germany in the final earned Scirea a lasting place in World Cup history. By 1986 World Cup, however, the team was in transition, and went out to France in the second round. This was to be Scirea's last match for Italy, having won 78 caps and scored 2 goals.

== Player profile ==
=== Style of play ===
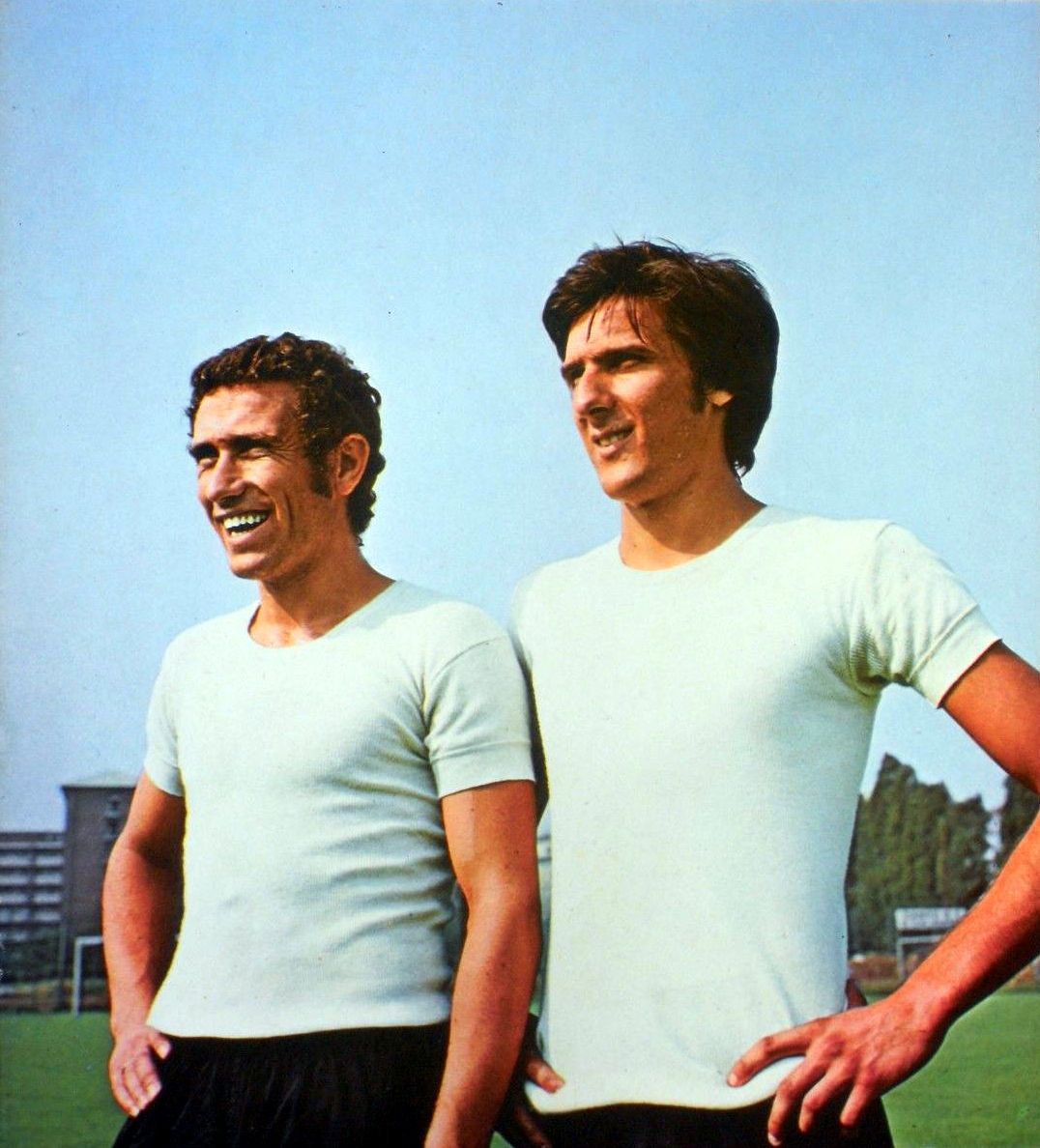
Scirea (right) and teammate Oscar Damiani in training for Juventus in the 1974–75 preseason

Scirea was a modern and highly talented defender, gifted with excellent technical skills and tactical ability, who was known for his pace, elegance on the ball, and innate capacity to read the game. In contrast to the ruthless tactics often employed by other defenders, including his paired partner, Claudio Gentile, Scirea was renowned for his class, fair play and sportsmanship. Scirea never earned a red card in his career. He was also known for his leadership, serving as captain of both Juventus and the Italy national side.

A former midfielder, he played the sweeper, or libero, role for most of his career, and contributed to the development of the position, due to his vision, composure on the ball and passing ability. Thus, in addition to aiding his team defensively, Scirea would detach himself from the defensive line and contribute to the attacking potential of his team, frequently being involved in the build-up of goals, and sometimes even scoring himself. In the latter part of his career, as he lost his pace, Scirea played a more defensive role as a centre-back.

=== Legacy ===
Scirea is considered by several pundits, players, and managers as one of the greatest defenders and sweepers in football history. In 2020, Mediaset described him as the best Italian defender of his generation, and Italy's greatest libero of all time, along with Franco Baresi. The back-lines he formed with Antonio Cabrini and Claudio Gentile at both club and international level (along with Sergio Brio at club level with Juventus, and Fulvio Collovati or Giuseppe Bergomi at international level with Italy) are considered to be two of the greatest defences of all time.

Due to his own defensive skill and sportsmanship, Scirea's name has become attached to various youth tournaments and fair-play awards as a role model for sportsmanship and sporting excellence following his death, including the Premio Nazionale Carriera Esemplare "Gaetano Scirea", which is awarded to a legendary Serie A footballer for their career achievements, talent, and personality. In 2005, former Italy national team coach Enzo Bearzot proposed the retirement of the jersey number six of that national team and Juventus in recognition of Scirea's career. The south stand in Juventus' home ground Juventus Stadium, as well as the one in the former Stadio delle Alpi, is known as the Curva Scirea and it is occupied by the Juventus Ultras.

== Personal life ==
Scirea was married to Mariella Cavanna; together they had a son, Riccardo. Mariella has become a politician after her husband's death. Scirea was Roman Catholic.

== Death ==
In summer 1989, Scirea visited Poland as an observer to watch Górnik Zabrze, against whom Juventus were to play in the UEFA Cup. On 3 September 1989, a car carrying him collided head-on with a truck near Babsk. The car carried four canisters of gasoline in the trunk (a common practice in Poland at that time due to frequent gas shortages), which exploded upon impact, killing Scirea along with two fellow passengers. It happened just two days after another fatal car accident related to Poland claimed the life of another international football star, Polish former midfielder Kazimierz Deyna.

== Honours ==
Juventus

- Serie A: 1974–75, 1976–77, 1977–78, 1980–81, 1981–82, 1983–84, 1985–86
- Coppa Italia: 1978–79, 1982–83
- European Cup: 1984–85
- European Cup Winners' Cup: 1983–84
- UEFA Cup: 1976–77
- European Super Cup: 1984
- Intercontinental Cup: 1985

Italy

- FIFA World Cup: 1982

Individual

- UEFA European Championship Team of the Tournament: 1980
- Guerin Sportivo All-Star Team: 1982
- Italian Football Hall of Fame: 2011
- Juventus Greatest XI of All Time: 2017
- Juventus FC Hall of Fame: 2025

== See also ==
- List of players to have won all international club competitions
- List of players to have won the three main European club competitions
