= Giovanni Koetting =

Italian footballer

Personal information
- Date of birth: 10 March 1962 (age 64)
- Place of birth: Ivrea, Italy
- Height: 1.79 m (5 ft 10 1/2 in)
- Position: Midfielder

Senior career*
Years	Team	Apps	(Gls)
1979–1985	Juventus	9	(1)
1980–1981	→ Udinese (loan)	2	(0)
1981–1982	→ SPAL (loan)	10	(0)
1985–1987	Ancona	48	(3)
1987–1988	Ivrea	1	(0)
1988–1993	Rivarolese		
- * Club domestic league appearances and goals

Giovanni Koetting (born 10 March 1962) is an Italian former professional footballer who played as a midfielder.

== Honours ==
Juventus

- Serie A champion: 1983–84.
- European Cup winner: 1984–85.
- UEFA Cup Winners' Cup winner: 1983–84.
