= Roberto Bettega =

Italian footballer

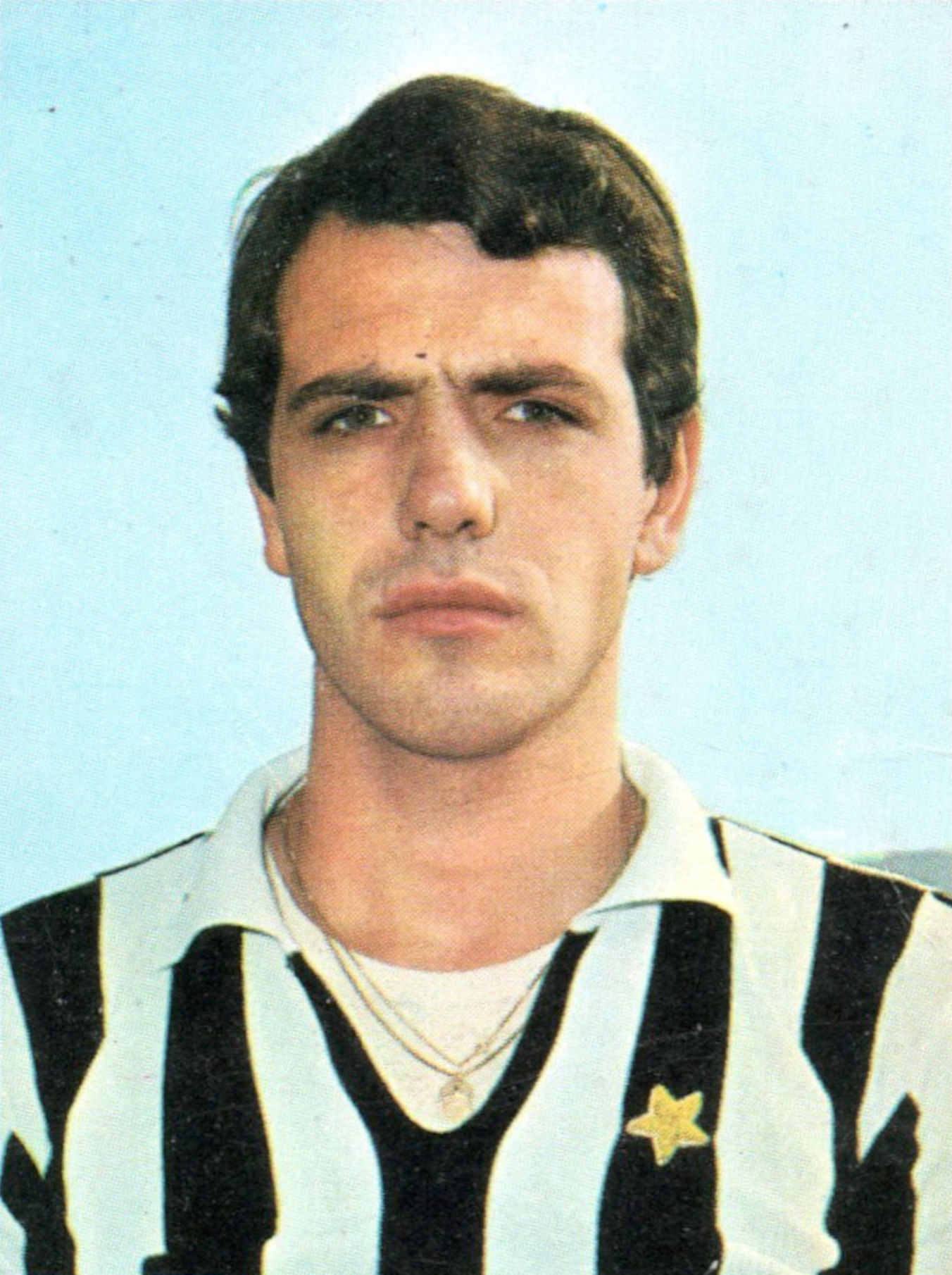
- Bettega with Juventus in 1971

Personal information
- Full name: Roberto Bettega
- Date of birth: 27 December 1950 (age 75)
- Place of birth: Turin, Italy
- Height: 1.84 m (6 ft 0 in)
- Position: Forward

Youth career
- Juventus

Senior career*
Years	Team	Apps	(Gls)
1969–1983	Juventus	326	(129)
1969–1970	→ Varese (loan)	30	(13)
1983–1984	Toronto Blizzard	48	(11)
Total		404	(153)

International career
1975–1983	Italy	42	(19)
- * Club domestic league appearances and goals

Roberto Bettega (Italian pronunciation: [roˈbɛrto ˈbɛtteɡa]; born 27 December 1950) is an Italian former footballer who played as a forward.

Bettega is mostly remembered for his successful time at his hometown club Juventus, where he won several titles and established himself as one of Italy's greatest ever players due to his strength, skill, goalscoring ability, and creativity. He was nicknamed Penna Bianca ("White Feather") due to his appearance, and Bobby Gol due to his eye for goal.

At international level, he represented Italy at the 1978 FIFA World Cup, and at the 1980 European Championships, helping his team to fourth-place finishes on both occasions; he was unable to take part at the 1982 World Cup, which Italy won, due to injury.

In December 2009, Bettega was officially appointed deputy director-general of Juventus. His role was to act as an intermediary between the players and coaching staff and the upper echelons of the club, as well as taking an active involvement in all of the Old Lady's transfer dealings. Bettega left the role a short time later in 2010 after the appointment of Luigi Del Neri as manager.

== Club career ==
=== Early career ===
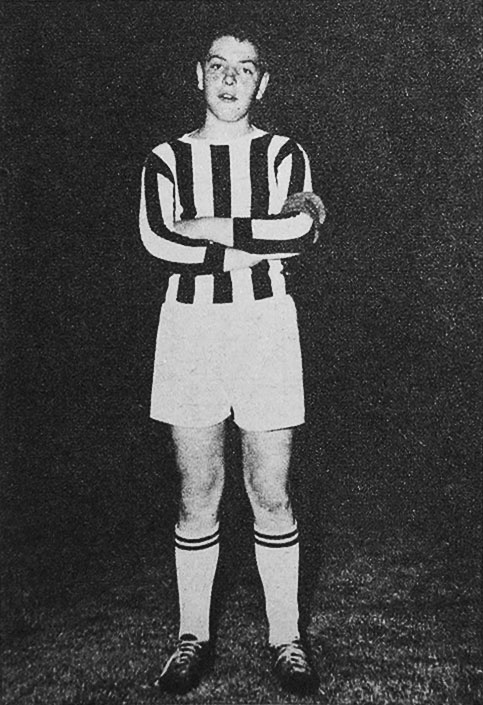
A 14-year-old Bettega with Juventus Youth Sector in 1964

Born in Turin, Bettega joined the Juventus Primavera squad in 1961 as a midfielder. Bettega spent the 1968–69 campaign on the bench. At the age of 19, Bettega was loaned to Varese in Serie B. Under Nils Liedholm, the coach of Varese, Bettega hit 13 goals to help the side finish top and gain promotion to Serie A.

Nils Liedholm said of Bettega: "He allies tremendous athletic strength with impressive technical skills. He is particularly strong in the air, and can kick the ball with either foot. All he needs is to build up experience, and then he will certainly be a force to be reckoned with."

=== Professional career ===
Back at Juventus, Bettega made his Serie A debut away to Catania on 27 September 1970. He scored the winning goal. Bettega ended the season with 13 goals in 28 matches. The following season, he scored ten goals in only 14 matches.

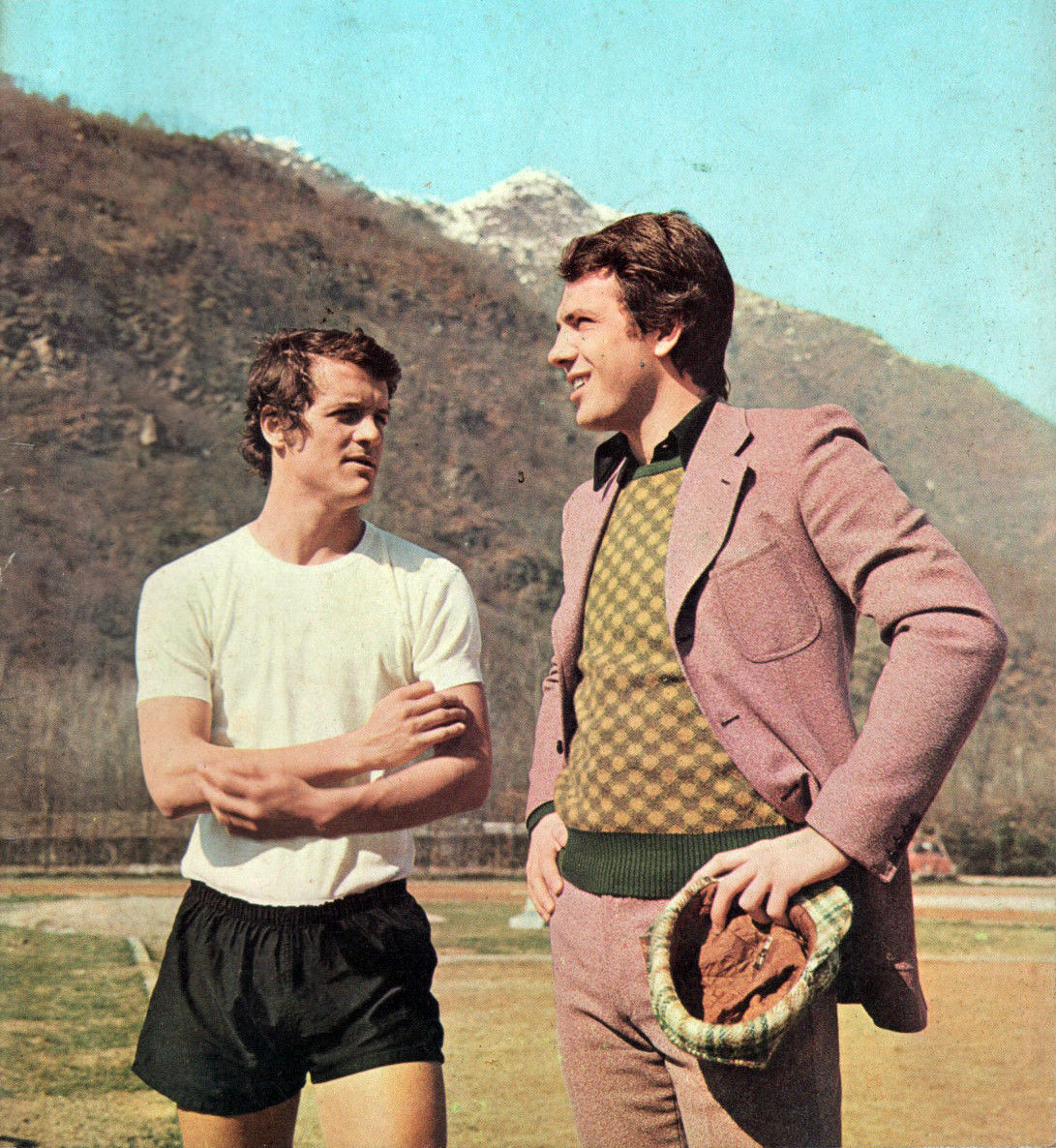
Bettega in 1972, during his period of enforced rest, talks with juventino teammate Fabio Capello (left).

He scored a goal against Fiorentina on 16 January 1972, but this was to be his last for a while because he was forced out of the game with a lung infection and the initial stages of tuberculosis, although he was still able to contribute to Juventus's Serie A title victory that season. He was not out for long, and returned on 24 September of the same year, leading the team to their second successive league title that season.

With the arrival of Giovanni Trapattoni in 1976 as coach, Bettega found himself becoming the main frontman of the bianconeri in the late 70s; the former player to take this position, Pietro Anastasi, moved to Internazionale in the summer of that year, and Bettega partnered with his replacement, Roberto Boninsegna, leading the team to notable domestic and European success during this period, including back to back Serie A titles, a Coppa Italia, and an UEFA Cup triumph; Juventus also reached the European Cup final during the 1972–73 season, as well as the Intercontinental Cup final, and managed a semi-final finish in the 1979–80 European Cup Winners' Cup.

Bettega won the Serie A title with Juventus yet again during the 1980–81 season, but did not feature extensively in Juventus's victorious defense of their Serie A campaign during the 1981–82 season, as he suffered knee ligament damage in a collision with an opposing goalkeeper during a 1981 European Cup match against Anderlecht. After finally regaining full fitness, he took to the pitch for the 1982–83 season, which would be his final season with the club. He retired from playing in Europe after Juventus lost the 1983 European Cup Final against Hamburg in Athens.

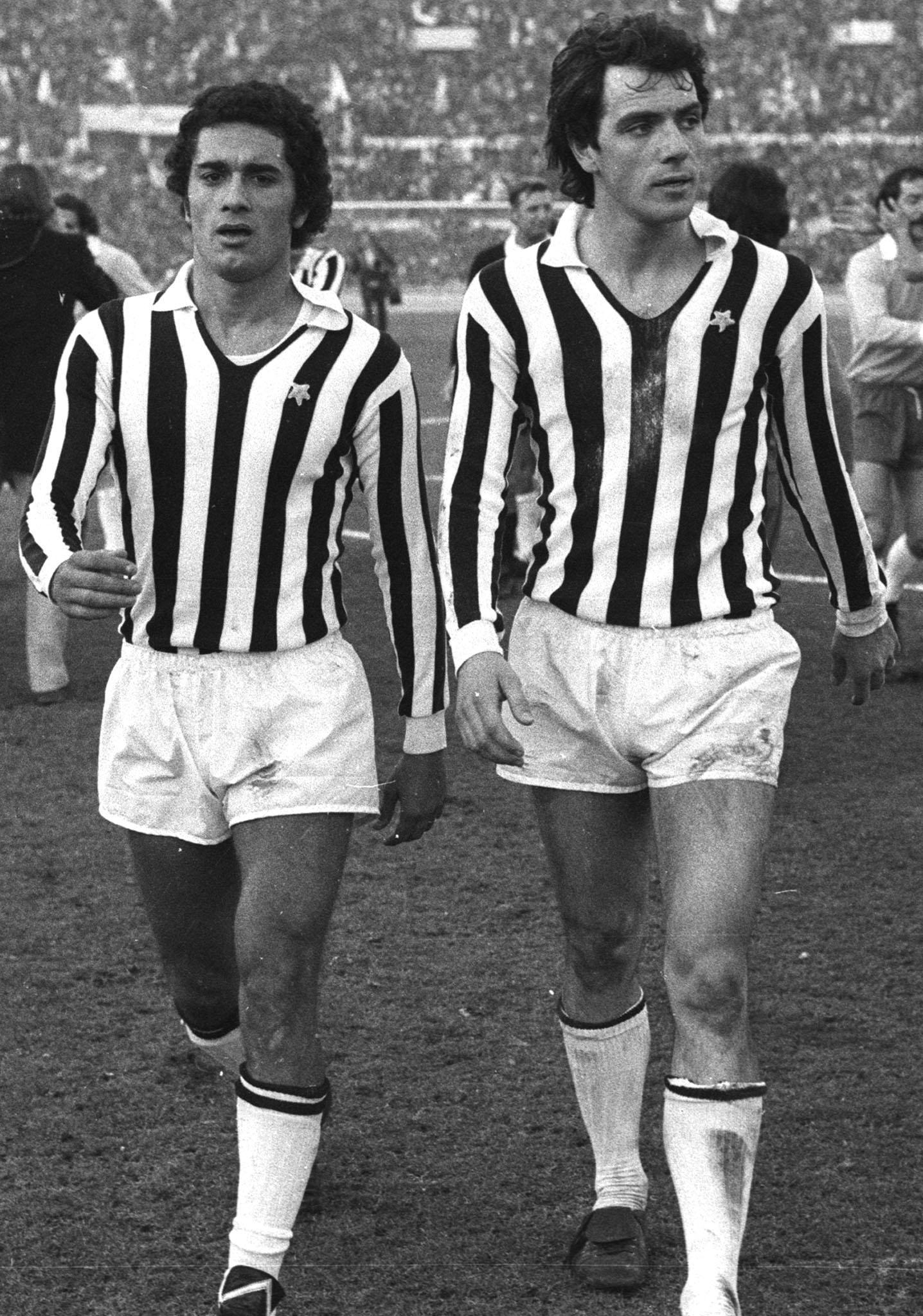
Claudio Gentile (left) and Bettega with bianconeri in the 1974–75 season

In total, Bettega made 326 league appearances for Juventus, scoring 129 league goals and enjoyed a highly successful career, winning seven league titles between 1972 and 1982, the 1977 UEFA Cup (in which he scored in the final) and the 1978-79 Coppa Italia titles. He also won the Capocannoniere (Serie A top scorer) in the 1979–80 season. Regarded as one of Juventus's best ever players, Bettega scored 179 goals for Juventus in all competitions, in 490 matches, including 22 goals in 74 Coppa Italia matches, and 27 goals in 81 European matches.

After retiring from European football, Bettega played two summers in the NASL with the Toronto Blizzard, helping the team to two second-place finishes during his two seasons with the club.

== International career ==
Bettega played 42 times for Italy national team, scoring 19 goals between 1975 and 1983. In 1975, Bettega got his first call-up for a match against Finland. He went on to play in the 1978 FIFA World Cup where he scored two goals to help Italy reach the second round, where they were defeated by the Netherlands, which denied them a spot in the final. Italy finished fourth after losing the third place play-off to Brazil at Estadio Monumental Antonio Vespuci, Buenos Aires. Bettega was named in the Team of the Tournament for his performances. Bettega also helped Italy to a fourth-place finish at the 1980 European Championship, a tournament played on home soil.

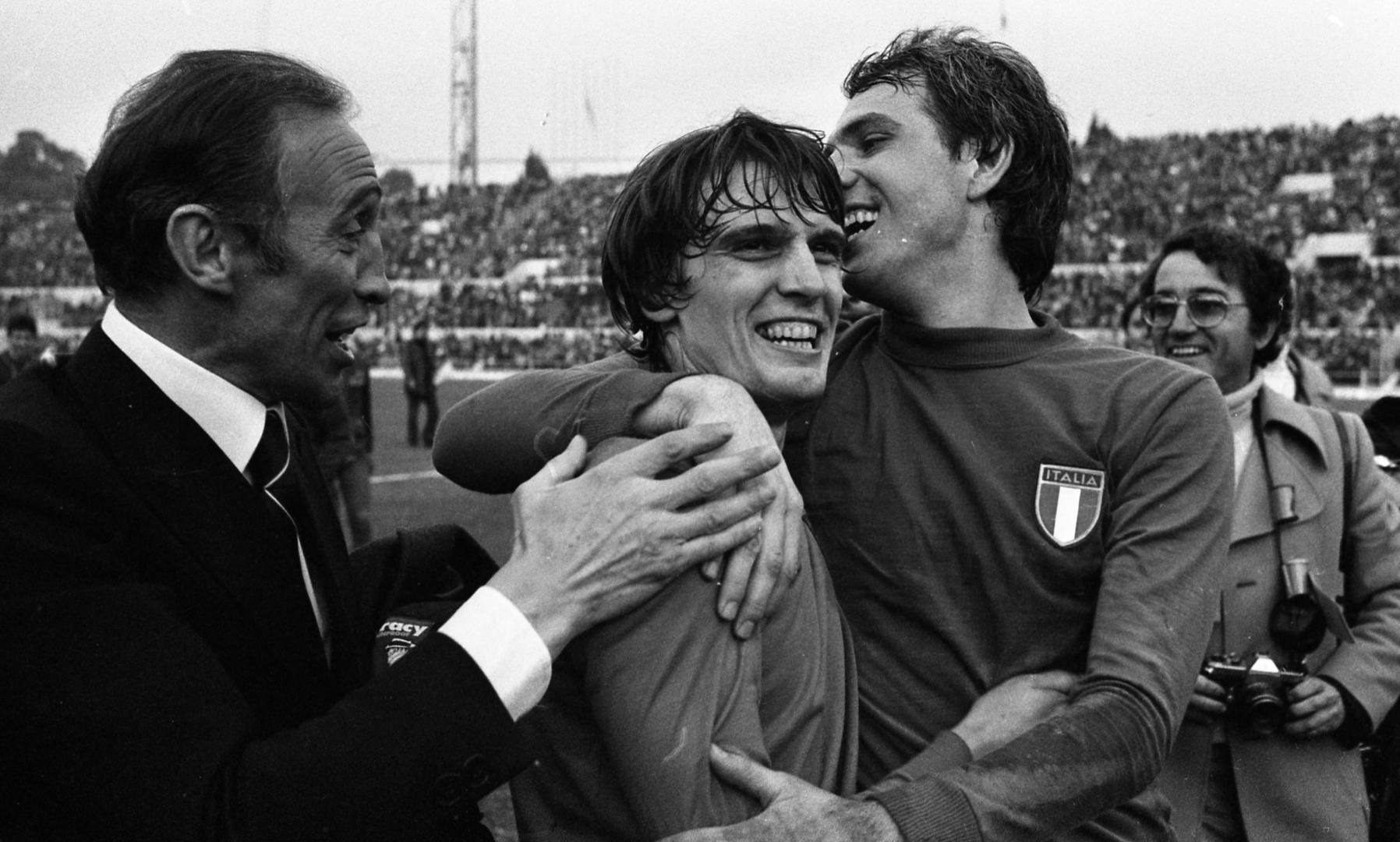
From left to right: manager Enzo Bearzot, Marco Tardelli and Bettega celebrates an Italian victory over England in 1976.

He was set to represent Italy at the 1982 FIFA World Cup, but suffered a knee ligament injury in a collision with an opposing goalkeeper during a 1981 European Cup match against Anderlecht, missing out on the '82 tournament, in which Italy were victorious.

== Style of play ==
Bettega was regarded as a player of noteworthy tactical intelligence, and in his prime, he was one of the most feared Italian strikers, due to his physical strength and prolific goalscoring ability. A tall, quick, agile, and athletic player, Bettega excelled in the air, and was known for scoring acrobatic goals, due to his elevation, coordination, opportunism, and timing, as well as his ability to make attacking runs to get on the end of crosses, and was an accurate and a clinical finisher with either foot. His elegance, aerial strength, and prematurely greying hair earned him the nickname Cabeza Blanca ("white head", in Spanish).

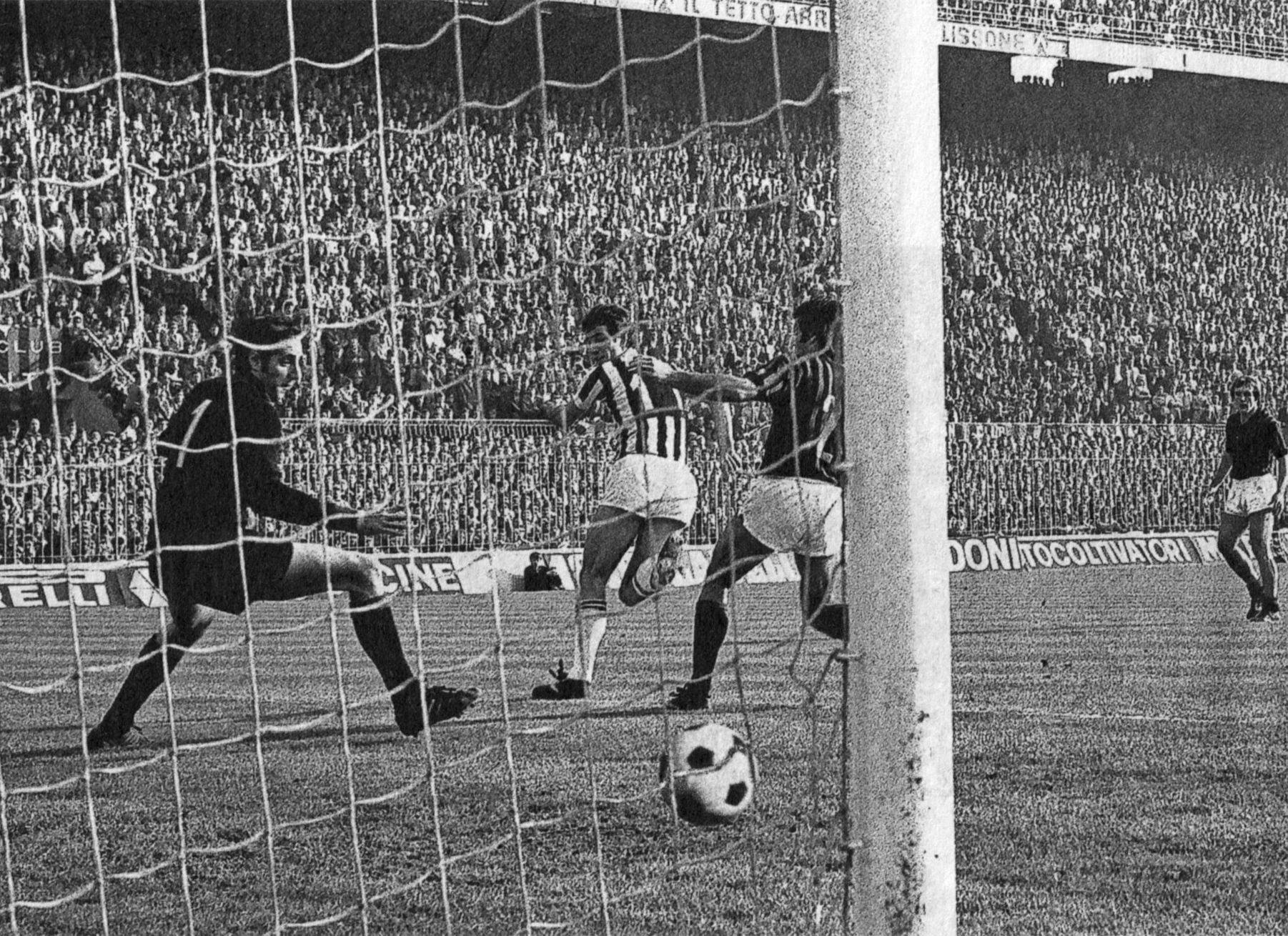
One of Bettega's most iconic goals, the back-heel versus A.C. Milan at San Siro in 1971.

Considered one of the greatest Italian footballers of all-time, Bettega was also regarded as a complete and modern team player, as he was capable of playing both as a midfielder and as a forward, courtesy of his stamina, vision, passing ability, and outstanding technical skills, which led him to be compared to former Juventus legend John Charles. He was usually used as a centre-forward earlier on in his career, but was also able to play in several other attacking roles, including as a left winger, and was even deployed in a more creative role, as a supporting striker, or as an attacking midfielder, during his later career, in particular after losing some of his natural pace, agility, and mobility. In addition to his ability as a footballer, Bettega also stood out for his personality, determination, and leadership throughout his career. Despite his playing ability, his career is thought to have been affected by his injuries, in particular during the later part of his career.

== After retirement ==
Bettega later returned to Juventus at the request of the club's chairman at the time, Umberto Agnelli, who asked him to be vice-chairman of the board of directors. He served the position from 1994 to 2006. He returned to Juventus again in 2009 as vice general manager. However, his return was short lived, after Andrea Agnelli became chairman and Giuseppe Marotta became CEO and general manager of the club in 2010.

== Personal life ==
Bettega has a son named Alessandro who also started his career in the Juventus system and was the captain of the Primavera team.

== Career statistics ==
=== Club ===
Appearances and goals by club, season and competition
Club	Season	League			Cup		Continental		Total	
Club	Season	Division	Apps	Goals	Apps	Goals	Apps	Goals	Apps	Goals
Varese	1969–70	Serie B	30	13	3	0	–		33	13
Juventus	1970–71	Serie A	28	13	3	2	11	6	42	21
Juventus	1971–72	Serie A	14	10	4	1	5	4	23	15
Juventus	1972–73	Serie A	27	8	8	1	7	2	42	11
Juventus	1973–74	Serie A	24	8	5	2	2	0	31	10
Juventus	1974–75	Serie A	27	6	10	3	10	1	47	10
Juventus	1975–76	Serie A	29	15	3	2	4	1	36	18
Juventus	1976–77	Serie A	30	17	4	1	12	5	46	23
Juventus	1977–78	Serie A	30	11	4	2	7	2	41	15
Juventus	1978–79	Serie A	30	9	9	2	2	0	41	11
Juventus	1979–80	Serie A	28	16	4	0	8	1	40	17
Juventus	1980–81	Serie A	25	5	8	3	4	3	37	11
Juventus	1981–82	Serie A	7	5	4	2	3	1	14	8
Juventus	1982–83	Serie A	27	6	7	1	6	1	40	8
Juventus	Total		326	129	73	22	81	27	480	178
Toronto Blizzard	1983	NASL	16	2	–		–		16	2
Toronto Blizzard	1984	NASL	23	8	–		–		23	8
Toronto Blizzard	Total		39	10	–		–		39	10
Career total			395	152	76	22	81	27	552	201

=== International ===
Appearances and goals by national team and year
National team	Year	Apps	Goals
Italy	1975	2	0
Italy	1976	7	8
Italy	1977	5	6
Italy	1978	12	3
Italy	1979	2	0
Italy	1980	10	1
Italy	1981	3	1
Italy	1982	0	0
Italy	1983	1	0
Total		42	19

== International goals ==
No.	Date	Venue	Opponent	Score	Result	Competition
1.	5 June 1976	Milan, Italy	Romania	3–1	4–1	Friendly
2.	5 June 1976	Milan, Italy	Romania	4–1	4–1	Friendly
3.	25 September 1976	Rome, Italy	Yugoslavia	1–0	3–0	Friendly
4.	25 September 1976	Rome, Italy	Yugoslavia	3–0	3–0	Friendly
5.	16 October 1976	Luxembourg City, Luxembourg	Luxembourg	2–0	4–1	1978 FIFA World Cup qualification
6.	16 October 1976	Luxembourg City, Luxembourg	Luxembourg	4–0	4–1	1978 FIFA World Cup qualification
7.	17 November 1976	Rome, Italy	England	2–0	2–0	1978 FIFA World Cup qualification
8.	22 December 1976	Lisbon, Portugal	Portugal	1–2	1–2	Friendly
9.	8 June 1977	Helsinki, Finland	Finland	2–0	3–0	1978 FIFA World Cup qualification
10.	15 October 1977	Turin, Italy	Finland	1–0	6–1	1978 FIFA World Cup qualification
11.	15 October 1977	Turin, Italy	Finland	2–0	6–1	1978 FIFA World Cup qualification
12.	15 October 1977	Turin, Italy	Finland	4–0	6–1	1978 FIFA World Cup qualification
13.	15 October 1977	Turin, Italy	Finland	5–0	6–1	1978 FIFA World Cup qualification
14.	3 December 1977	Rome, Italy	Luxembourg	1–0	3–0	1978 FIFA World Cup qualification
15.	6 June 1978	Mar del Plata, Argentina	Hungary	2–0	3–1	1978 FIFA World Cup
16.	10 June 1978	Buenos Aires, Argentina	Argentina	1–0	1–0	1978 FIFA World Cup
17.	24 February 1979	Milan, Italy	Netherlands	1–0	3–0	Friendly
18.	11 October 1980	Luxembourg City, Luxembourg	Luxembourg	2–0	2–0	1982 FIFA World Cup qualification
19.	17 October 1981	Belgrade, Yugoslavia	Yugoslavia	1–1	1–1	1982 FIFA World Cup qualification

== Honours ==
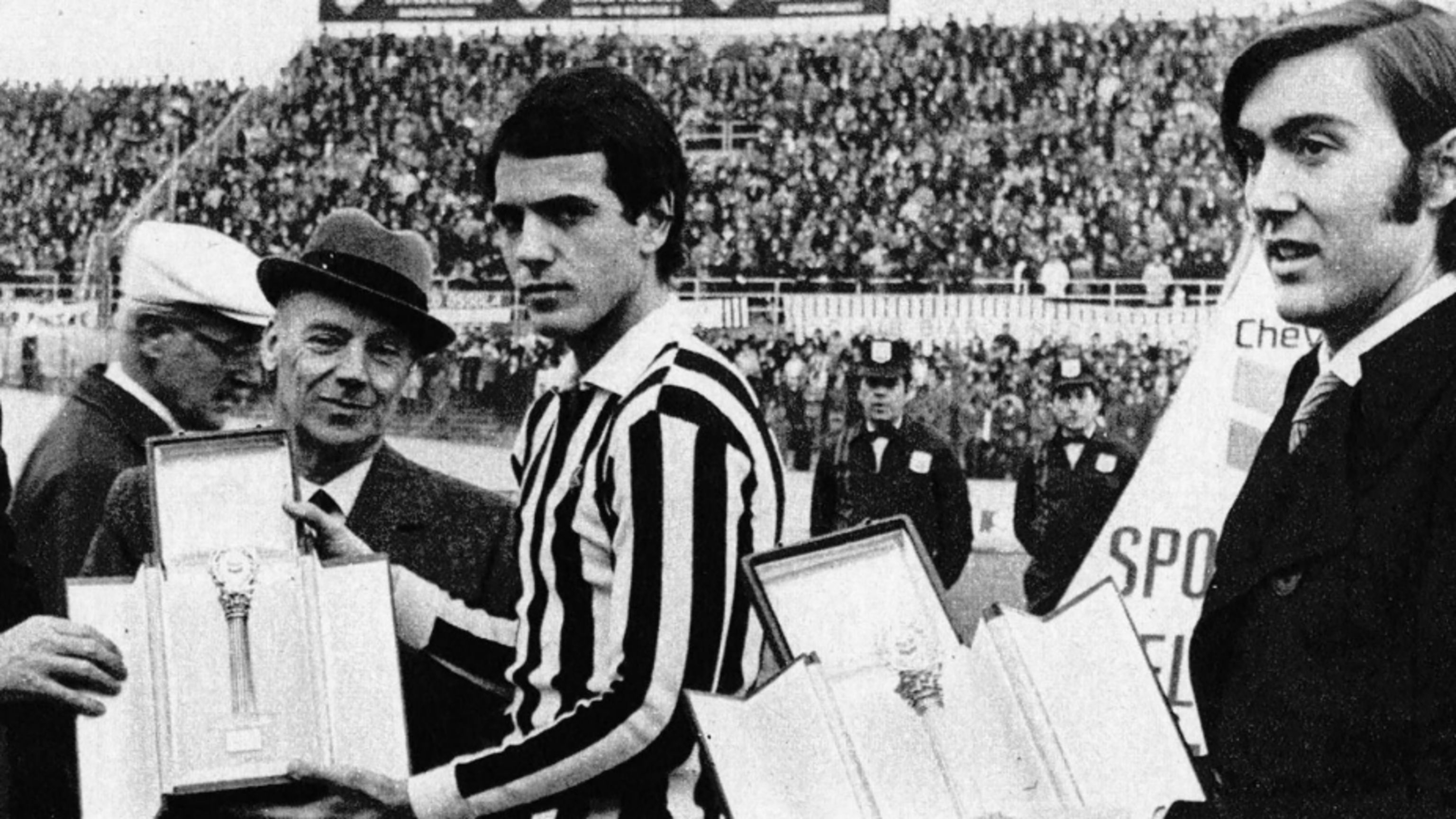
Bettega (centre) in December 1970, wearing Juventus colors, awarded as 1969–70 Serie B top scorer during his previous period at Varese.

Juventus

- Serie A: 1971–72, 1972–73, 1974–75, 1976–77, 1977–78, 1980–81, 1981–82
- Coppa Italia: 1978–79
- UEFA Cup: 1976–77
- Intercontinental Cup runner-up: 1973
- European Cup runner-up: 1972–73, 1982–83
- Inter-Cities Fairs Cup runner-up: 1970–71

Varese

- Serie B: 1969–70

Italy

- FIFA World Cup semi-finals: 1978
- UEFA European Championship semi-finals: 1980

Individual

- Capocannoniere: 1979–80
- Serie B top scorer: 1969–70
- FIFA World Cup All-star Team: 1978
- World Soccer XI: 1978
- Juventus FC Hall of Fame: 2025
