= Antonio Cabrini =

Italian footballer and manager (born 1957)

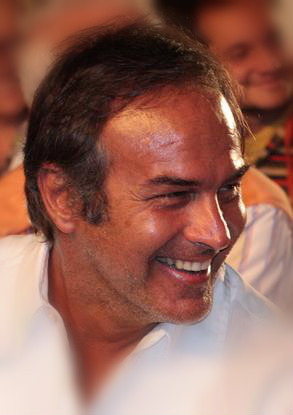
- Cabrini in 2008

Personal information
- Date of birth: 8 October 1957 (age 69)
- Place of birth: Cremona, Italy
- Height: 1.77 m (5 ft 10 in)
- Position: Left-back

Youth career
- Cremonese

Senior career*
Years	Team	Apps	(Gls)
1973–1975	Cremonese	29	(2)
1975–1976	Atalanta	35	(1)
1976–1989	Juventus	297	(33)
1989–1991	Bologna	55	(2)
Total		416	(38)

International career
1978–1987	Italy	73	(9)

Managerial career
- 2000–2001: Arezzo
- 2001: Crotone
- 2004–2005: Pisa
- 2005–2006: Novara
- 2012–2017: Italy women
Medal record
Men's football
Representing Italy
FIFA World Cup
Winner	1982 Spain
- * Club domestic league appearances and goals

Antonio Cabrini (Italian pronunciation: [anˈtɔːnjo kaˈbriːni]; born 8 October 1957) is an Italian professional football manager and a former player. He played as a left-back, mainly with Juventus. He won the 1982 FIFA World Cup with the Italy national team. Cabrini was nicknamed Bell'Antonio ("beautiful Antonio"), because of his popularity as a charismatic and good-looking football player. On the field, he made a name for himself as one of Italy's greatest defenders ever, and is remembered in particular for forming one of the most formidable defensive units of all time with Italy and Juventus, alongside goalkeeper Dino Zoff, as well as defenders Claudio Gentile and Gaetano Scirea. Cabrini won the Best Young Player Award at the 1978 World Cup, after helping Italy manage a fourth-place finish, and also represented Italy at Euro 1980, once again finishing in fourth place. He is one of the few players to have won all UEFA Club competitions, an achievement he managed with Juventus. In 2021, he was inducted into the Italian Football Hall of Fame.

== Club career ==
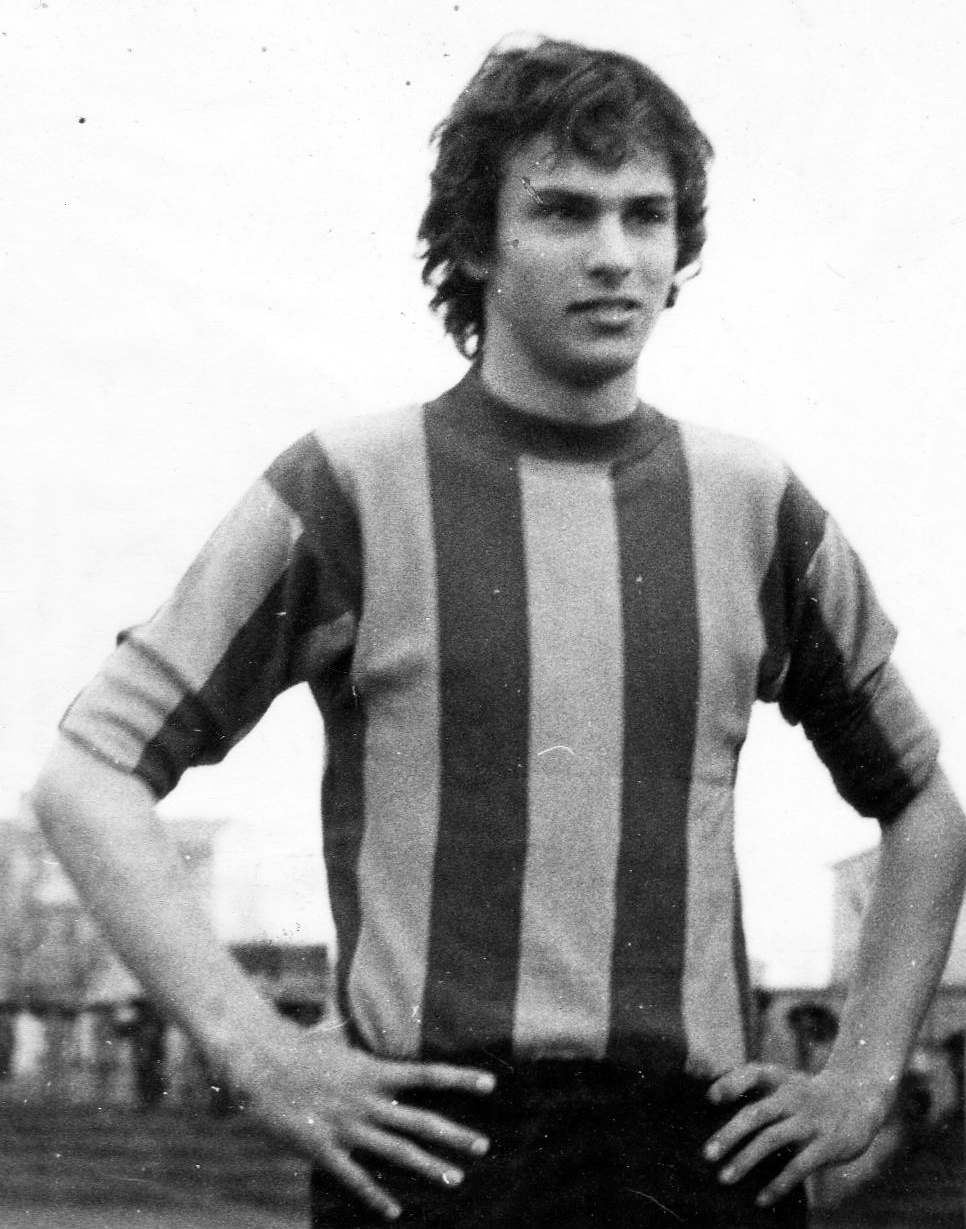
A rookie Cabrini with Cremonese in the early 1970s

Cabrini was born in Cremona, Lombardy. He made his professional football debut with the local team U.S. Cremonese in the Serie C during the 1973–74 season, making three appearances and gaining a starting place the following 1974–75 season. In the 1975–76 season, he played in the Serie B for Atalanta, and in the summer of 1976 he was acquired by Juventus, the team for which he was to spend most of his career.

With Juventus, he won the Serie A six times, the Coppa Italia two times, one UEFA Super Cup, one European Cup, one UEFA Cup and one Intercontinental European/South American Cup. In his final season with Juventus, he also captained the side, after inheriting the armband from Scirea. In 1989, after 13 successful seasons with the Turin club, he moved to Bologna for two more years before retiring as a player. He played a total of 352 Serie A matches (297 of them with Juventus), scoring 35 goals (33 of them with Juventus).

== International career ==
Cabrini was called up to Italy's being part of the list of 20 players to participate in the 1978 FIFA World Cup despite being uncapped (he however, had 23 caps for junior teams). He earned his first cap on 2 June 1978, in Italy's opening game against France, which ended in a 2–1 win for the "Azzurri"; Italy went on to finish the tournament in fourth place, and Cabrini was named the Best Young Player of the Tournament. He soon became an international regular for the next nine years; he participated as a starter in all of Italy's games in three consecutive World Cups: in 1978, 1982 and 1986. Overall, Cabrini played 18 games during World Cup final stages, winning the 1982 edition despite missing a penalty in the 25th minute of final against West Germany. He also represented Italy at Euro 1980 as a starter on home soil, finishing the tournament in fourth place, after reaching the semi-finals.

Cabrini was part of the 1982 World Cup-winning team that included goalkeeper Dino Zoff, Gaetano Scirea, Giuseppe Bergomi, Claudio Gentile in defense, Marco Tardelli and Bruno Conti in midfield, and Cabrini's Juventus teammate Paolo Rossi in attack. Cabrini had a strong performance throughout the tournament, helping to lead his country to win the title, keeping two clean sheets throughout the tournament, but also scoring the crucial match-winning goal in Italy's 2–1 second round win over defending champions Argentina.

In total, he earned 73 caps for his country and scored nine goals (an Italy international record for a defender), ending his career with the Azzurri in October 1987, earning his final appearance on 17 October 1987, in a 0–0 draw against Switzerland. He also captained the national side ten times.

== Style of play ==
A fast and powerful attacking left-back, Cabrini is considered one of the greatest full-backs of his generation and of all time, as well as being regarded as one of the best defenders in the history of Italian football. A former left winger, he was also capable of playing on the left side of an attacking trident; he was later switched to left-back by his manager Ivanoe "Babo" Nolli during his time with the Cremonese youth side. Cabrini's attacking prowess, eye for goal, intelligence, and crossing ability, along with his passing, flair and technical ability, enabled him to revolutionise the role of the modern full-back in Italian football, and he added a new attacking dimension to the position: he was known for being prolific in front of goal, despite his defensive playing role, courtesy of his striking ability from distance, and his ability to make attacking runs up the flank; due to his timing and elevation, he was also strong in the air, and was an effective free kick and penalty kick taker. These skills, combined with his precociousness, consistency, and defensive ability, as well as his athletic, and physical qualities, made of him one of the best full-backs in the world in his prime. Despite his popularity off the pitch and open character, he was known for being a man of few words throughout his career; moreover he also stood out for his discipline as a footballer, as he neither smoked nor drank.

== Managerial career ==
=== Club coaching career ===
Cabrini started a coaching career in 2000 with Serie C1 club Arezzo, replacing Serse Cosmi and losing promotion on playoffs. He then coached Serie B's Crotone with little fortune, and later served as head coach for Serie C1 clubs Pisa and Novara, although with dismal results.

He was announced to become the head coach of the Syria national team in September 2007, but soon after the announcement, problems started in the Syrian FA between the board of Directors and the Syrian National Teams Sponsors and thus the agreement with Cabrini was finally terminated in February 2008, before he actually managed the team. He was planned to take the Syrian team through the World Cup 2010 Qualifiers and to make a preparation camp in Italy, but all that was canceled after the financial problems within the FA.

=== Italy women's national team ===
On 14 May 2012, Cabrini was appointed coach of Italy women's national team. On 4 August 2017, after five years as coach, he was replaced by Milena Bertolini.

== Personal life ==
Later in 2008, he briefly contested the Italian TV reality show L'Isola dei Famosi (localized version of Celebrity Survivor). In June 2009 he entered politics by joining Italy of Values, as party responsible for sports issues in the Lazio region.

== Honours ==
Juventus

- Serie A: 1976–77, 1977–78, 1980–81, 1981–82, 1983–84, 1985–86
- Coppa Italia: 1978–79, 1982–83
- Intercontinental Cup: 1985
- European Cup: 1984–85
- European Cup: Runner-up: 1982–83
- UEFA Cup Winners' Cup: 1983–84
- UEFA Cup: 1976–77
- UEFA Super Cup: 1984

Italy

- FIFA World Cup: 1982
- FIFA World Cup: Semi-finals: 1978
- UEFA European Championship: Semi-finals: 1980

Individual

- FIFA World Cup Best Young Player Award: 1978
- Sport Ideal European XI: 1978, 1979, 1980
- Onze Mondial: 1978, 1982, 1983, 1985
- Serie A Team of The Year: 1982, 1984, 1986
- Guerin Sportivo All-Star Team: 1983, 1984
- Italian Football Hall of Fame: 2021
- Juventus FC Hall of Fame: 2025

== See also ==
- List of players to have won all international club competitions
- List of players to have won the three main European club competitions
