= Claudio Gentile =

Italian footballer and manager (born 1953)

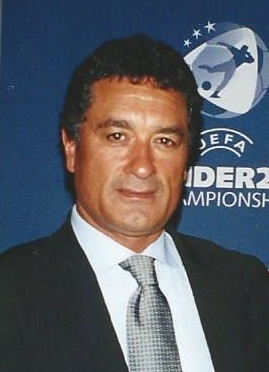
- Gentile in 2006

Personal information
- Date of birth: 27 September 1953 (age 73)
- Place of birth: Tripoli, Kingdom of Libya
- Height: 1.78 m (5 ft 10 in)
- Position: Defender

Senior career*
Years	Team	Apps	(Gls)
1971–1972	Arona	34	(4)
1972–1973	Varese	34	(1)
1973–1984	Juventus	283	(9)
1984–1987	Fiorentina	70	(0)
1987–1988	Piacenza	20	(0)
Total		441	(14)

International career
1975–1984	Italy	71	(1)

Managerial career
- 2000–2006: Italy U21 / Italy Olympic
- 2014: Sion
Medal record
Men's football
Representing Italy (as player)
FIFA World Cup
Winner	1982 Spain
Representing Italy (as manager)
UEFA European Under-21 Championship
Winner	2004 Germany
Olympic Games
Third place	2004 Athens	Team
- * Club domestic league appearances and goals

Claudio Gentile (Italian pronunciation: [ˈklaudjo dʒenˈtiːle]; born 27 September 1953) is an Italian football manager and former player who played as a defender in the 1970s and 1980s.

Gentile appeared for Italy in two World Cup tournaments, and played for the winning Italian team in the 1982 final. His club career was notably spent with Juventus for whom he made almost 300 league appearances, winning six national titles and two major European trophies.

== Early life ==
Gentile was born on 27 September 1953, in Tripoli, Kingdom of Libya during the time period of Italian colonization, to parents from Noto, Sicily. At the age of eight, he moved with his family to Brunate, Lombardy.

== Club career ==
After beginning his career with Arona, Gentile played in Serie B with Varese during the 1972–73 season.

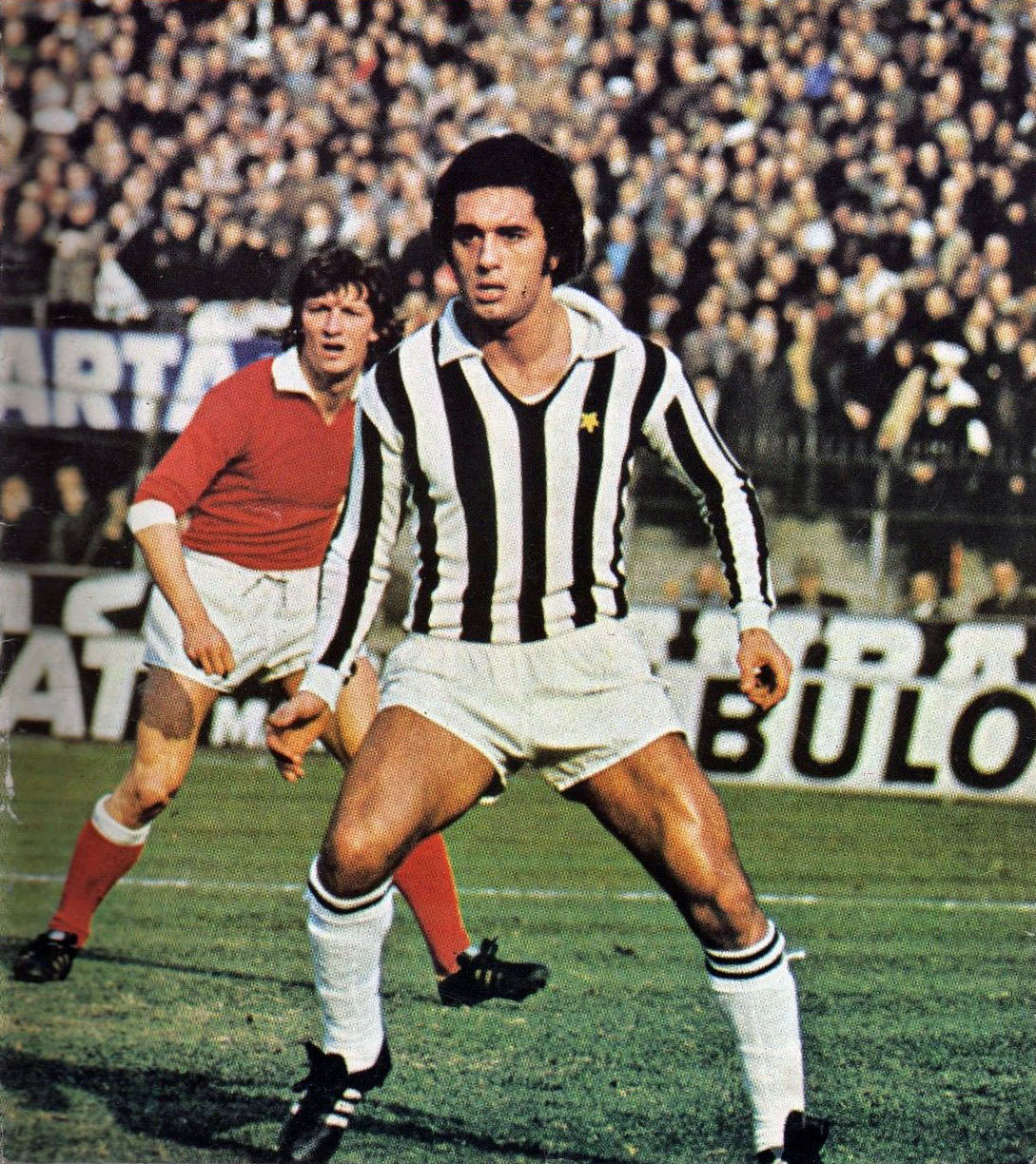
Gentile playing for Juventus in 1975

He then moved to Juventus and first played for them in a Coppa Italia match against Ascoli on 29 August 1973, with his Serie A debut following on 2 December 1973 against Verona. In all, he played 414 senior matches for Juventus, including 283 in Serie A. In over a decade with Juventus, Gentile won two major European club competitions (1976–77 UEFA Cup and 1983–84 European Cup Winners' Cup), six Serie A championships, and two Coppa Italias. He also reached the final of the 1982–83 European Cup with the Turin club, only to suffer a 1–0 defeat against Hamburg in Athens. During the match, Gentile was involved in a controversial incident when he collided with opposing Danish forward Lars Bastrup in the opening minutes of the second half, with Juventus trailing; although Bastrup suffered a broken jaw as a result of the impact, the incident went unnoticed by the referee.

In 1984, Gentile moved to rivals Fiorentina where he spent three further seasons in Serie A, making over 60 appearances for the club. He then played a final season with Piacenza, in Serie B, retiring at the end of the 1987–88 season.

== International career ==
Gentile lining up for Italy in 1977

Gentile was capped on 71 occasions by Italy between 1975 and 1984, scoring a single goal during his international career. He played in all of Italy's matches at the 1978 World Cup, where Italy finished in fourth place, after reaching second place in the final group stage of the tournament and then losing the 3rd place playoff to Brazil. Gentile also played in the 1980 European Championship, and he was named in the team of the tournament.

In the 1982 World Cup, Gentile was once again a permanent member of the starting line-up as Italy went on to win the World Cup that year. He gained notoriety for his aggressive man-marking of Diego Maradona in a second-round victory against Argentina at the 1982 World Cup, where he fouled the Argentine star 11 times in the first half, and 23 in total, after which Gentile famously quipped, "Football is not for ballerinas!" Italy ended up defeating the defending champions Argentina 2–1. Italy then faced tournament favorites Brazil in the next second-round group match and won 3–2, in which Paolo Rossi scored a hat trick, while Gentile was tasked with marking Brazilian star playmaker Zico. Italy defeated Poland 2–0 in the semi-final, a match in which Gentile did not feature due to suspension. He returned to the starting line-up for the final against West Germany where Italy won 3–1. Gentile was once again in the team of the tournament for his performances during the 1982 World Cup.

== Style of play ==
Gentile was regarded as one of the best defenders of his generation, one of the toughest ever players in his position, and as one of the greatest Italian defenders of all time. A hard-tackling and versatile defender, he was capable of playing both as a man-marking centre-back or "stopper", and as a full-back on either flank, and was particularly known for his tight, heavy, physical marking of opponents, as well as his work-rate, and aggressive challenges. He was also capable of playing as a sweeper, a role which he occupied towards the end of his career, as he lost some of his pace, or in the centre of the pitch as a defensive midfielder. He also stood out for his ability in the air.

Although he was not initially known to be the most naturally talented footballer from a skilful standpoint, and was seen as more of a defensive-minded right-back, who mainly sought to break down opposing attacks, he was known for his discipline in training, and showed significant technical improvements throughout his career. Indeed, he was a mobile and hard-working player, who was also capable of contributing offensively as an attacking full-back in a zonal-marking system, by getting up the flank and providing deliveries into the box for his teammates. Alongside Juventus and Italy teammates Dino Zoff, Brio, Cabrini, and Scirea, he formed one of the most formidable defensive lines in football history.

In 2007, The Times placed Gentile at number 8 in their list of the 50 hardest footballers in history. However, despite his infamous reputation, Gentile considered himself to be a hard yet fair player. He was only sent off once in his career, with Juventus, in a 2–0 away loss to Club Brugge in a European Cup semi-final match in April 1978, for a double booking following a handball.

Due to his aggressive playing style and country of birth, Gentile was given the nickname Gaddafi in the Italian media. However, Gentile himself disliked the nickname, saying “they didn't realise how much I detested that nickname [...]: I couldn't stand it because I knew what he [Gheddafi] had done to the Italians and to my relatives.” He preferred to be referred by the diminutive of his surname, Gento.

== Coaching career ==
Gentile later coached the Italy national under-21 team which won the 2004 UEFA European Under-21 Championship, and the Olympic team which won a bronze at the 2004 Olympics in Athens.

On 5 June 2014, he signed two-year deal with Sion.

== Honours ==
=== Player ===
Juventus

- Serie A: 1974–75, 1976–77, 1977–78, 1980–81, 1981–82, 1983–84
- Coppa Italia: 1978–79, 1982–83
- UEFA Cup Winners' Cup: 1983–84
- UEFA Cup: 1976–77
- Intercontinental Cup: Runner-up: 1973
- European Cup: Runner-up: 1982–83

Italy

- FIFA World Cup: 1982
- FIFA World Cup: Semi-finals: 1978
- UEFA European Football Championship: Semi-finals: 1980

==== Individual ====
- Sport Ideal European XI: 1978
- UEFA European Championship Team of the Tournament: 1980
- FIFA World Cup All-star Team: 1982
- Guerin Sportivo's All-Star Team: 1980, 1982
- Juventus FC Hall of Fame: 2025

=== Coach ===
Italy U21

- UEFA European Under-21 Championship: 2004

Italy Olympic Team

- Summer Olympic Games: Bronze Medal: 2004
