= Pietro Paolo Virdis =

Italian footballer (born 1957)

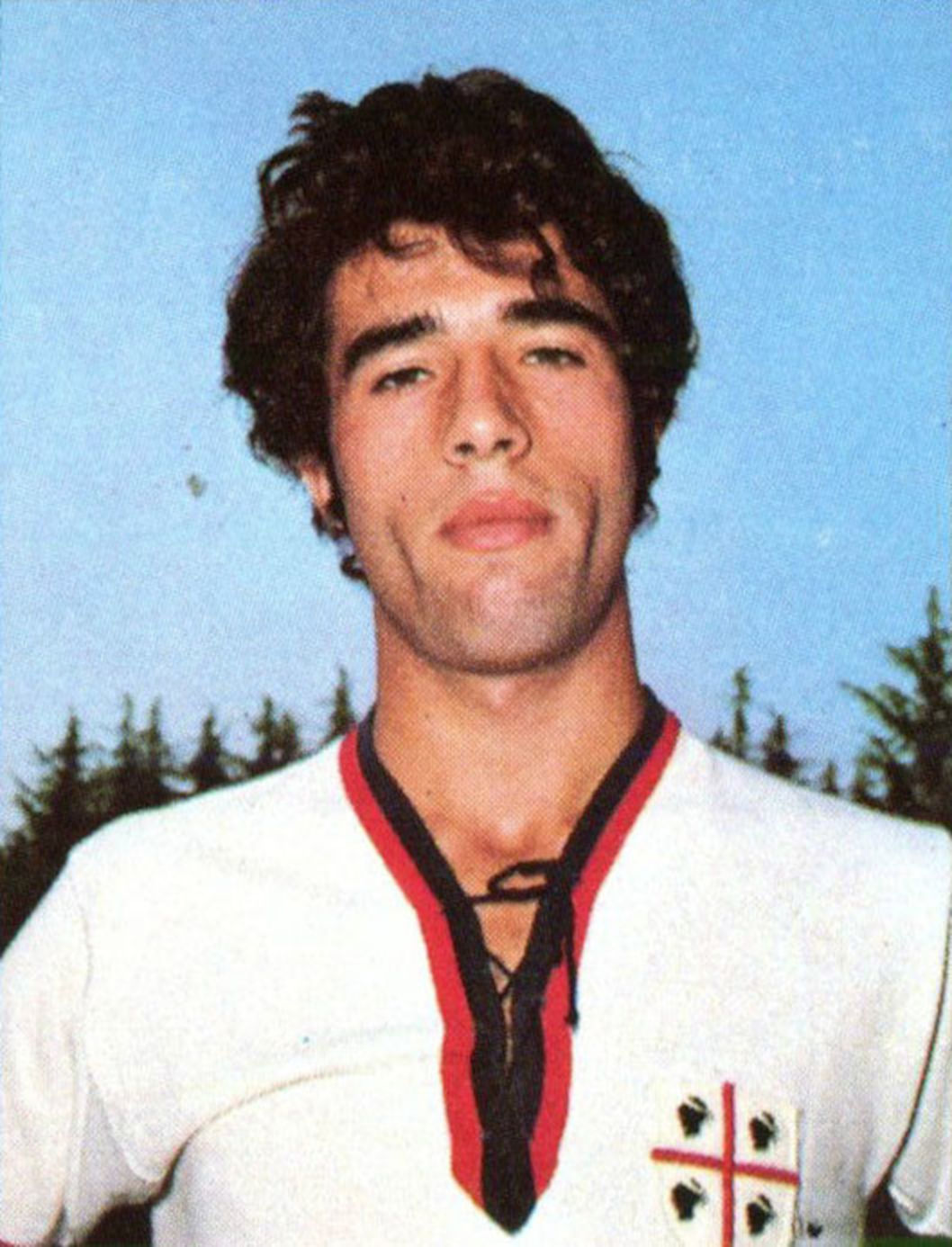
- Virdis with Cagiari in 1975

Personal information
- Full name: Antonio Pietro Paolo Virdis
- Date of birth: 26 June 1957 (age 69)
- Place of birth: Sassari, Italy
- Height: 1.82 m (6 ft 0 in)
- Position: Forward

Youth career
- 1971–1973: Juvenilia Sassari

Senior career*
Years	Team	Apps	(Gls)
1973–1974	Nuorese	25	(11)
1974–1977	Cagliari	75	(24)
1977–1980	Juventus	45	(8)
1980–1981	Cagliari	22	(5)
1981–1982	Juventus	30	(9)
1982–1984	Udinese	45	(12)
1984–1989	Milan	135	(53)
1989–1991	Lecce	46	(8)
Total		423	(130)

International career
1976–1978	Italy U21	8	(1)
1987–1988	Italy Olympic	15	(9)

Managerial career
- 1998–1999: Atletico Catania
- 2001: Viterbese
- 2002: Nocerina
- * Club domestic league appearances and goals

Antonio Pietro Paolo Virdis (born 26 June 1957) is an Italian football manager and former player, who played as a forward. Throughout his career, he played for Nuorese, before playing in Serie A with Cagliari Calcio, Juventus, Udinese Calcio, and AC Milan; he ended his career with Lecce. Known for his eye for goal, with Juventus, he won two league titles and a Coppa Italia; with Milan, he was the league's top scorer in 1987, also winning a league title and the Supercoppa Italiana in 1988, and was part of the club's European Cup victory in 1989. At international level, he represented Italy at the 1988 Summer Olympics, helping the team to a fourth-place finish.

== Club career ==
Born in Sassari, Italy, Virdis started his career in his native Sardinia with amateur Serie D side Nuorese in 1973, scoring 11 goals in his first senior season at the young age of 16. He later joined Cagliari, making his Serie A debut on 6 October 1974 in a league game versus Lanerossi Vicenza.

In 1977, he joined Juventus, where he played until 1982, except for a one-year stint back at Cagliari in 1980–81. After failing to find a first team place, in 1982 he left Juventus for Udinese. In 1984, he then moved at AC Milan, where he enjoyed his best period at club level. He made his Serie A debut with the club in a 2–1 away defeat to Parma on 22 August 1984, and he played five seasons with the rossoneri, winning the Serie A top-scorer title during the 1986–87 season, with 17 goals; he also won the 1987–88 Serie A title, and the 1988 Supercoppa Italiana with the club, followed by the 1988–89 European Cup. In total, he made 186 appearances for Milan, scoring 76 goals, 53 of which were scored in Serie A in 135 appearances. In 1989, aged 32, he left AC Milan to join Lecce, where he spent his final two seasons as a professional footballer before retiring in 1991.

== International career ==
Although he never gained a cap for the senior squad, he helped the Italian Olympic team qualify for Seoul 1988. In the tournament, he went on to score three goals in six matches as Italy reached the semi-finals, losing out 2–0 to West Germany in the bronze medal final. Before this he competed in the 1982 UEFA European Under-21 Championship with the Italy U21 national team.

== Managerial career ==
After retiring from active football, Virdis tried to pursue a career as a manager. In November 1998 he took his first managerial role, becoming head coach of Serie C1 club Atletico Catania, being however fired later in April 1999.

He then returned into management in March 2001, accepting an offer from Viterbese of Serie C1. However, his stint lasted a mere two months, as he was fired in May of that year. In April 2002 he then accepted a managerial role at Nocerina, leading the team for the final few weeks of the season.

He later left football and opened a restaurant and wine bar in Milan. However, in July 2008 he stated his interest in getting back into management.

== Career statistics ==
Appearances and goals by club, season and competition
Club	Season	League		
Club	Season	Division	Apps	Goals
Nuorese	1973–74	Serie D	25	11
Cagliari	1974–75	Serie A	19	0
Cagliari	1975–76	Serie A	23	6
Cagliari	1976–77	Serie B	33	18
Cagliari	Total		75	24
Juventus	1977–78	Serie A	10	1
Juventus	1978–79	Serie A	23	6
Juventus	1979–80	Serie A	12	1
Juventus	Total		45	8
Cagliari	1980–81	Serie A	22	5
Juventus	1981–82	Serie A	30	9
Udinese	1982–83	Serie A	16	2
Udinese	1983–84	Serie A	29	10
Udinese	Total		45	12
AC Milan	1984–85	Serie A	28	9
AC Milan	1985–86	Serie A	28	6
AC Milan	1986–87	Serie A	28	17
AC Milan	1987–88	Serie A	25	11
AC Milan	1988–89	Serie A	26	10
AC Milan	Total		135	53
Lecce	1989–90	Serie A	25	4
Lecce	1990–91	Serie A	21	4
Lecce	Total		46	8
Career total			423	130

== Honours ==
Juventus

- Serie A: 1977–78, 1981–82
- Coppa Italia: 1978–79

AC Milan

- Serie A: 1987–88
- Supercoppa Italiana: 1988
- European Cup: 1988–89

Individual

- Serie A Team of The Year: 1987
- Serie A top scorer: 1986–87
- A.C. Milan Hall of Fame
