= 1981–82 Serie A =

80th season of top-tier Italian football

Serie A
- Season: 1981–82
- Dates: 13 September 1981 – 16 May 1982
- Champions: Juventus; 20th title
- Relegated: Milan; Bologna; Como
- European Cup: Juventus
- Cup Winners' Cup: Internazionale
- UEFA Cup: Roma; Fiorentina; Napoli
- Matches: 240
- Goals: 474 (1.98 per match)
- Top goalscorer: Roberto Pruzzo (15 goals)

Serie A 1981-82 team distribution

The 1981–82 Serie A season was won by Juventus on 16 May 1982, coming down to a win by Juventus and a draw by Fiorentina. Going into the final week, both teams were tied at 44 points. Juventus defeated Catanzaro 1:0 while Fiorentina and Cagliari played to a 0:0 draw.

== Teams ==
Milan, Cesena and Genoa had been promoted from Serie B.

== Final classification ==
Pos	Team	Pld	W	D	L	GF	GA	GD	Pts	Qualification or relegation
1	Juventus (Note: Juventus became the first team in Italian football to be awarded two golden stars, to commemorate their 20th title win.) (C)	30	19	8	3	48	14	+34	46	Qualification to European Cup
2	Fiorentina	30	17	11	2	36	17	+19	45	Qualification to UEFA Cup
3	Roma	30	15	8	7	40	29	+11	38	Qualification to UEFA Cup
4	Napoli (Note: Napoli obtained a UEFA spot for the Albanian political renounce.)	30	10	15	5	31	21	+10	35	Qualification to UEFA Cup
5	Internazionale	30	11	13	6	39	34	+5	35	Qualification to Cup Winners' Cup
6	Ascoli	30	9	14	7	26	21	+5	32	
7	Catanzaro	30	9	10	11	25	29	−4	28	
8	Avellino	30	9	9	12	22	26	−4	27	
9	Torino	30	8	11	11	25	30	−5	27	
10	Cesena	30	8	11	11	34	41	−7	27	
11	Udinese	30	9	8	13	27	37	−10	26	
12	Cagliari	30	7	11	12	33	36	−3	25	
13	Genoa	30	6	13	11	24	29	−5	25	
14	Milan (R)	30	7	10	13	21	31	−10	24	Relegation to Serie B
15	Bologna (R)	30	6	11	13	25	37	−12	23	Relegation to Serie B
16	Como (R)	30	3	11	16	18	42	−24	17	Relegation to Serie B

Source: RSSSF.com
Rules for classification: 1) points; 2) Head-to-head points; 3) goal difference; 4) number of goals scored.
(C) Champions; (R) Relegated

== Results ==
Home \ Away	ASC	AVE	BOL	CAG	CAT	CES	COM	FIO	GEN	INT	JUV	MIL	NAP	ROM	TOR	UDI
Ascoli	—	1–1	2–1	2–1	2–1	1–0	1–1	0–0	1–1	2–2	1–0	1–0	0–0	0–1	0–0	3–0
Avellino	1–0	—	0–1	1–4	1–0	2–0	1–1	1–2	0–0	0–1	0–1	2–0	3–0	1–0	0–0	0–1
Bologna	2–1	1–0	—	1–1	0–0	0–0	1–0	0–2	1–1	3–1	0–0	0–0	2–2	2–0	0–0	0–2
Cagliari	1–0	0–0	2–2	—	2–1	1–1	2–0	0–0	2–1	1–1	0–1	1–1	1–1	2–4	1–0	1–1
Catanzaro	1–0	0–0	1–0	1–0	—	3–0	0–0	0–2	1–0	0–0	0–1	3–0	0–1	1–1	1–0	0–0
Cesena	1–1	2–0	4–1	2–1	4–1	—	1–1	2–1	1–1	1–3	1–1	2–3	1–3	1–1	0–0	2–1
Como	1–2	0–1	2–2	2–1	1–1	2–1	—	1–1	1–1	1–1	0–2	2–0	0–4	0–1	0–1	0–2
Fiorentina	0–0	1–0	1–0	1–1	1–0	1–0	1–0	—	3–2	4–2	0–0	1–0	2–1	1–0	2–1	3–0
Genoa	0–0	0–2	1–0	1–1	2–0	0–0	1–0	0–0	—	1–1	2–1	1–2	2–0	0–1	0–1	2–1
Internazionale	0–0	2–1	2–1	1–3	1–1	3–2	4–0	1–1	0–0	—	0–0	2–1	1–1	3–2	1–0	1–1
Juventus	1–1	4–0	2–0	1–0	4–1	6–1	3–1	0–0	1–0	1–0	—	3–2	0–0	0–1	4–2	1–0
Milan	0–0	2–1	2–1	1–0	0–1	1–0	1–1	0–0	0–0	0–1	0–1	—	1–1	1–2	0–0	0–1
Napoli	0–0	0–0	2–0	1–0	1–1	2–2	2–0	0–1	2–2	2–0	0–0	0–1	—	1–0	2–0	0–0
Roma	2–1	0–0	3–1	2–1	2–2	0–1	2–0	2–0	1–0	3–2	0–3	1–1	1–1	—	3–0	1–1
Torino	2–1	1–1	1–0	4–2	1–2	0–0	0–0	2–2	2–0	0–1	0–1	2–1	0–0	2–2	—	1–0
Udinese	0–2	1–2	2–2	1–0	2–1	0–1	1–0	1–2	3–2	1–1	1–5	0–0	0–1	0–1	3–2	—

Legend: Blue = home team win; Yellow = draw; Red = away team win.

== Top goalscorers ==
Rank	Player	Club	Goals
1	(Italy) Roberto Pruzzo	Roma	15
2	(Italy) Edi Bivi	Catanzaro	12
3	(Italy) Claudio Pellegrini	Napoli	11
4	(Argentina) Daniel Bertoni	Fiorentina	9
4	(Italy) Francesco Graziani	Fiorentina	9
4	(Austria) Walter Schachner	Cesena	9
4	(Italy) Oliviero Garlini	Cesena	9
4	(Italy) Roberto Mancini	Bologna	9
4	(Italy) Pietro Paolo Virdis	Juventus	9
4	(Italy) Alessandro Altobelli	Internazionale	9
4	(Italy) Evaristo Beccalossi	Internazionale	9
4	(Italy) Luigi Piras	Cagliari	9

== Attendances ==
#	Club	Average
1	Napoli	58,267
2	Fiorentina	47,660
3	Milan	45,781
4	Roma	45,289
5	Internazionale	43,970
6	Juventus	37,500
7	Genoa	34,767
8	Udinese	31,838
9	Cagliari	26,425
10	Bologna	25,917
11	Torino	24,105
12	Avellino	23,303
13	Cesena	20,222
14	Ascoli	17,596
15	Catanzaro	16,123
16	Como	12,301

== References and sources ==
- Almanacco Illustrato del Calcio 1983 (in Italian). Modena: Panini Group. 1982.
