= Giovanni Trapattoni =

Italian football player and manager (born 1939)

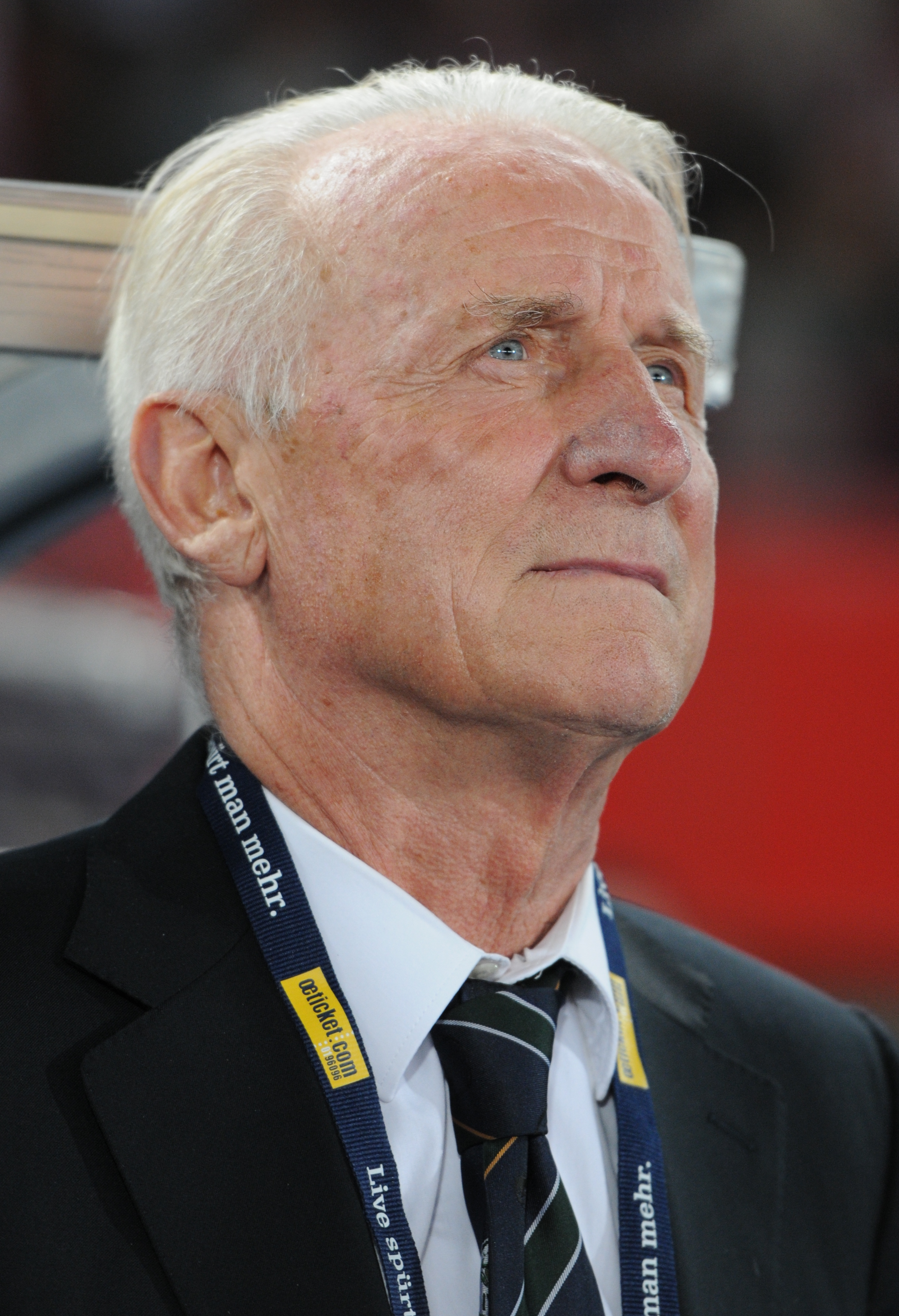
- Trapattoni as manager of the Republic of Ireland in 2013

Personal information
- Date of birth: 17 March 1939 (age 87)
- Place of birth: Cusano Milanino, Kingdom of Italy
- Height: 1.75 m (5 ft 9 in)
- Positions: Centre back; defensive midfielder

Youth career
- 1953–1959: Milan

Senior career*
Years	Team	Apps	(Gls)
1957–1971	Milan	274	(3)
1971–1972	Varese	10	(0)
Total		284	(3)

International career
1960–1964	Italy	17	(1)

Managerial career
- 1974: Milan
- 1975–1976: Milan
- 1976–1986: Juventus
- 1986–1991: Inter Milan
- 1991–1994: Juventus
- 1994–1995: Bayern Munich
- 1995–1996: Cagliari
- 1996–1998: Bayern Munich
- 1998–2000: Fiorentina
- 2000–2004: Italy
- 2004–2005: Benfica
- 2005–2006: VfB Stuttgart
- 2006–2008: Red Bull Salzburg
- 2008–2013: Republic of Ireland
- 2010: Vatican City
- * Club domestic league appearances and goals

Giovanni Trapattoni (Italian pronunciation: [dʒoˈvanni trapatˈtoːni]; born 17 March 1939), popularly nicknamed "Trap", is an Italian former football manager and player, considered the most successful club coach in Italian football.

A former defensive midfielder, as a player he spent almost his entire club career with AC Milan, where he won two Serie A league titles (1961–62 and 1967–68), and two European Cups, in 1962–63 and 1968–69. Internationally, he played for Italy, earning 17 caps and being part of the squad at the 1962 FIFA World Cup in Chile.

One of the most celebrated managers in football history, Trapattoni is one of only six coaches, alongside Carlo Ancelotti, Ernst Happel, Tomislav Ivić, José Mourinho and Eric Gerets, to have won league titles in four different European countries; in total, Trapattoni has won 10 league titles in Italy, Germany, Portugal and Austria. Alongside Udo Lattek and José Mourinho, he is one of the three coaches to have won all three major European club competitions (European Cup, European Cup Winners' Cup, UEFA Cup) and the only one to do so with the same club (Juventus). Also, he is the only one to have won all official continental club competitions and the world title, achieving this during his first spell with Juventus. He is one of the rare few to have won the European Cup, the Cup Winners' Cup and Intercontinental Cup as both a player and manager.

Regarded as the most famous and consistent disciple of Nereo Rocco, Trapattoni coached his native Italy national team to the 2002 FIFA World Cup and UEFA Euro 2004, but could not replicate his club successes with Italy, suffering a controversial early exit in both competitions. Trapattoni led the Republic of Ireland national team to their first European Championships in 24 years, enjoying a successful UEFA Euro 2012 qualifying campaign. This followed narrowly missing out on the 2010 FIFA World Cup, after his team were controversially knocked out by France.

He is one of only five coaches, alongside Ignacio Trelles, Luiz Felipe Scolari, Roy Hodgson and Dick Advocaat, to have managed 1,000 or more club games and 100 or more national team games.

== Club career ==
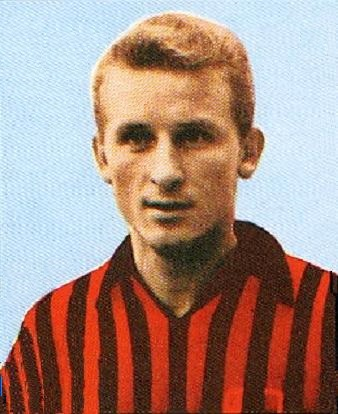
Trapattoni with AC Milan in 1963

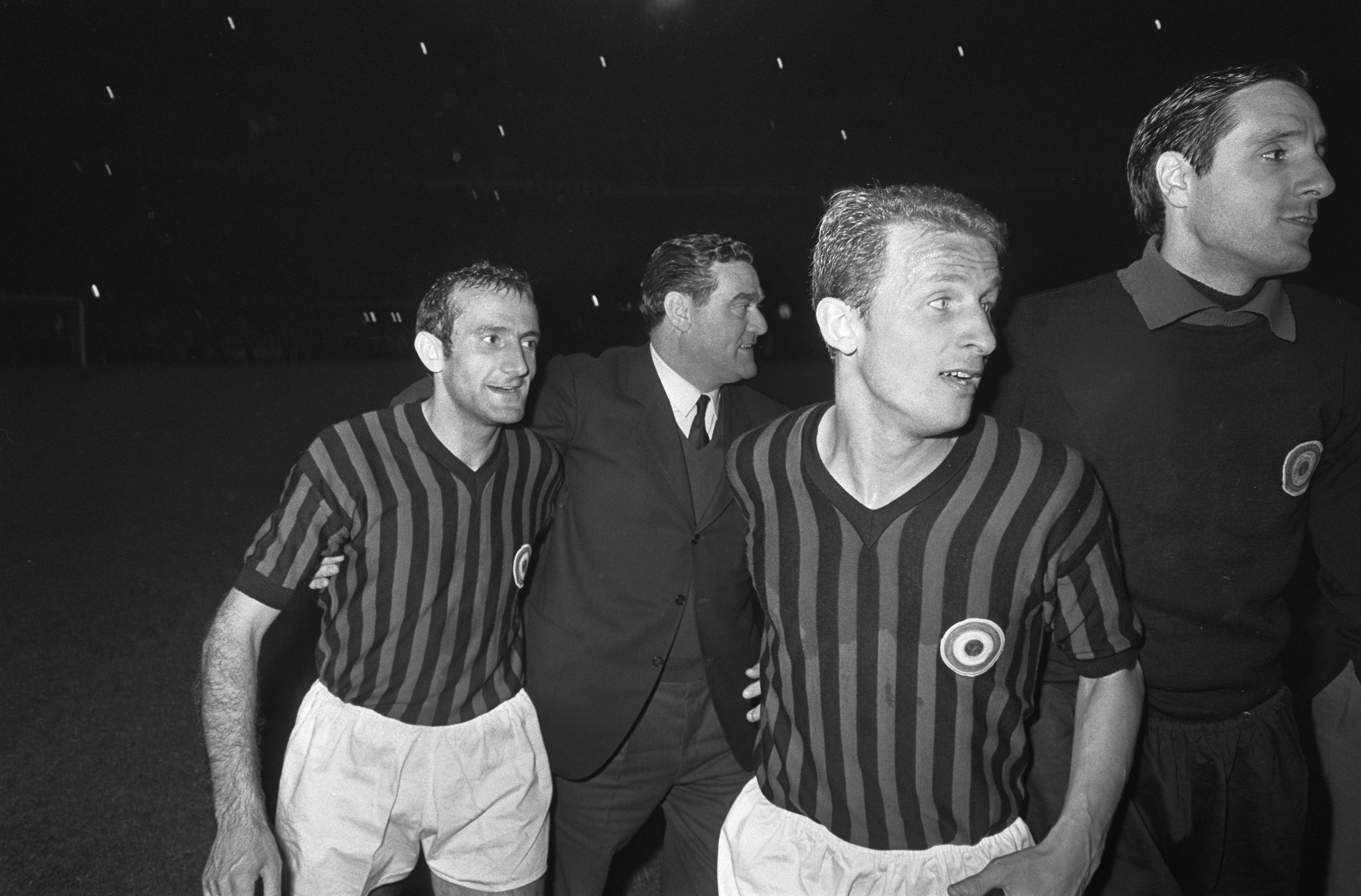
Trapattoni (centre) at the 1968 European Cup Winners' Cup Final in Rotterdam

Born in Cusano Milanino near Milan, Trapattoni had a successful career as a player with AC Milan, playing either as a central defender or as a defensive midfielder with the main task of passing the ball to more creative players such as Giovanni Lodetti and Gianni Rivera. He won two Serie A titles (1961–1962, 1967–1968) and two European Cups (1962–1963, 1968–1969) during his time with Milan, and was one of the stars of the 1963 European Cup Final against Benfica, successfully man-marking Eusébio in the second half. Similarly, in the team's 4–1 victory in the 1969 European Cup Final against Ajax, he drew praise in the Italian media for his defending and ability to nullify the offensive threat of Johan Cruyff.

After taking a break from the national team, Trapattoni thought he could settle with a mid-table team for one last season instead of being at one club all his life, subsequently moving to Varese and, after a successful season with them, retired from professional football and embarked on a highly successful managerial career two years later.

== International career ==
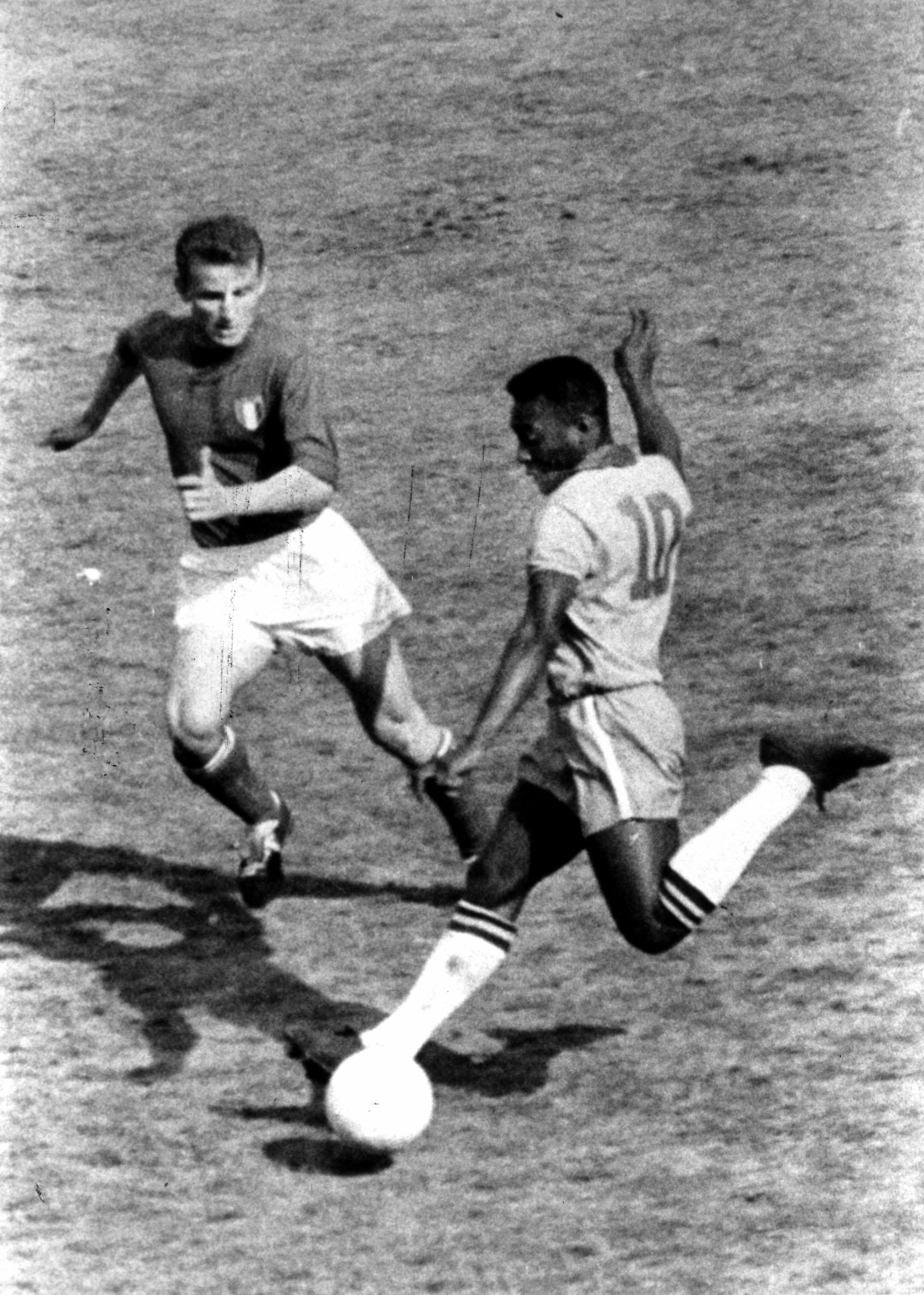
Trapattoni (left) with the Italy national football team in 1963, opposed to the Brazilian Pelé

Trapattoni also played for the Italy national football team between 1960 and 1964, earning 17 caps and scoring 1 goal. Most notably, he was part of the squad at the 1962 FIFA World Cup in Chile, although he was unable to play any matches during the tournament after sustaining an injury. He was also part of Italy's squad at the 1960 Summer Olympics.

Trapattoni is also remembered for his performance in Italy's 3–0 friendly victory over Brazil at the San Siro stadium in Milan on 12 May 1963; during the match, he was able to nullify Pelé's impact on the game through his man-marking ability, with the latter asking to be substituted for Quarentinha in the 26th minute of the second half, whom Trapattoni also successfully defended. However, Pelé later stated in 2000 that his performance was due to stomach pains, and that he was forced to play due to contractual obligations; Trapattoni himself also frequently downplayed Pelé's performance during the match, even prior to Pelé's comments, stating: "the truth is that on that day he was half-injured. Tired. I was a good footballer, but let's leave Pelé alone. He was a martian."

== Style of play ==
A defensive-minded player, Trapattoni was capable of playing both in defence, as a centre-back, and in midfield, as a defensive midfielder, due to his work-rate and ability to win back possession and subsequently distribute the ball forward to his more offensive-minded teammates. Above all, he was known for his excellent man-marking skills.

== Coaching career ==
=== 1974–1986: Early career at AC Milan and Juventus ===
Trapattoni began coaching at Milan as a youth team coach, before becoming caretaker coach. Trapattoni was caretaker coach from 9 April 1974 to 30 June 1974. His first match was the 1973–74 European Cup Winners' Cup semi–final first leg against Borussia Mönchengladbach. Milan won the match 2–0. They got to the final after only losing the second leg 1–0. Milan lost the final 2–0 to East German club 1. FC Magdeburg. Milan finished seventh in Serie A. He was appointed first team coach in 1975.

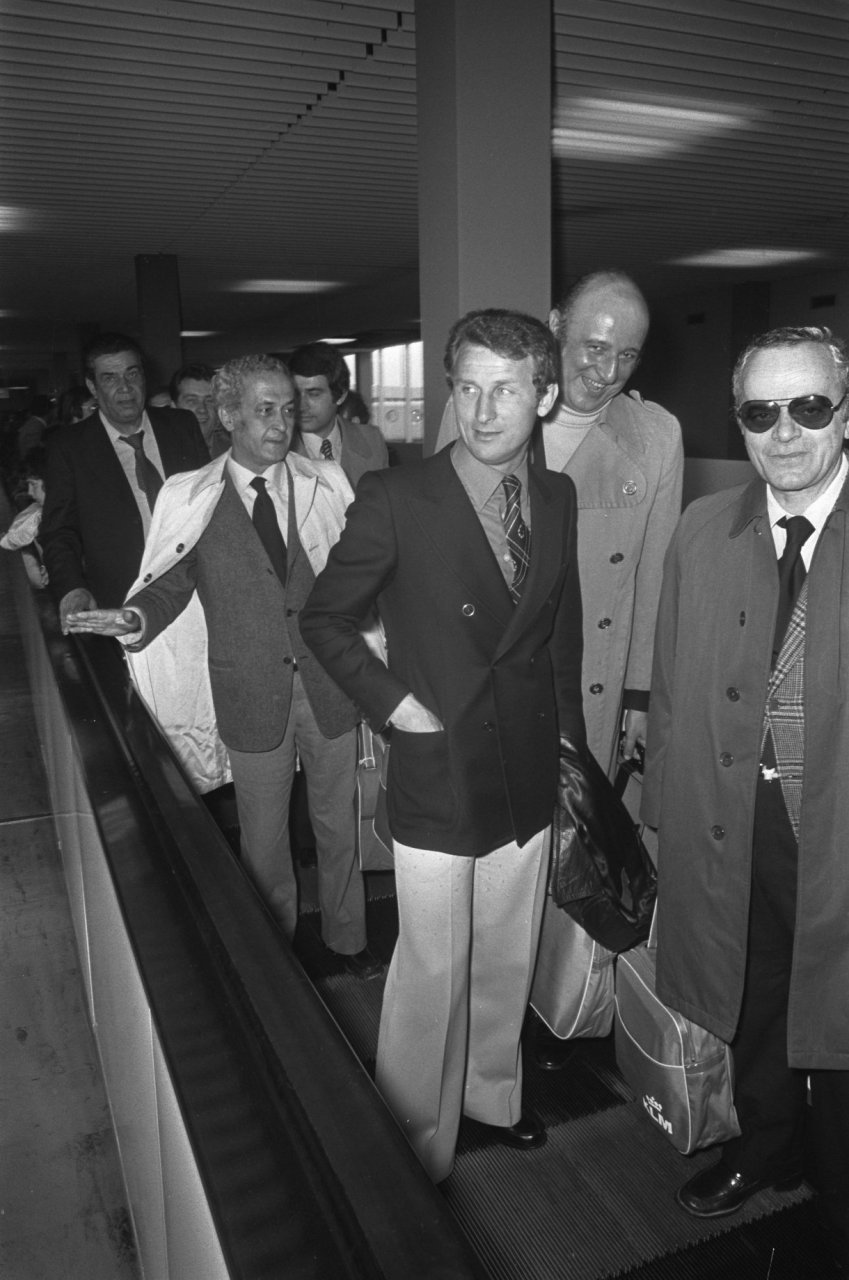
Trapattoni as Milan manager at Schiphol airport in Amsterdam before the 1974 European Cup Winners' Cup Final in Rotterdam

Trapattoni was head coach for Juventus for ten consecutive years, from 1 July 1976 to 30 June 1986. Trapattoni won all UEFA and international club competitions during this time (a European record).

He won the Serie A league title six times (1976–77, 1977–78, 1980–81, 1981–82, 1983–84, 1985–86), the Coppa Italia twice (1978–79 and 1982–83), the European Cup in 1984–85, the Intercontinental Cup in 1985, the UEFA Cup Winners' Cup in 1983–84, the European Super Cup in 1984, and the UEFA Cup in 1976–77.

Apart from winning the European Cup over Liverpool in 1984–85, Trapattoni came close to conquering the trophy on another occasion, in 1982–83, but Juventus suffered a surprising defeat at the hands of Hamburg in the Athens final, finishing as runners-up.

During his years managing Juventus, Trapattoni became well-known among fans and journalists throughout Europe for combining man-management with tactical knowledge.

=== 1986–1994: Inter Milan and return to Juventus ===
Trapattoni coached Inter Milan from 1 July 1986 to 30 June 1991. While in charge of Inter, he won the Serie A in 1988–89, the Supercoppa Italiana in 1989 and the UEFA Cup in 1990–91.

He then managed Juventus for a second time between 1991 and 1994, winning the UEFA Cup in 1992–93.

=== 1994–1996: Bayern Munich, return to Serie A ===
Trapattoni became coach of Bayern Munich in the summer of 1994, after the end of his second spell with Juventus. However, he left at the end of the 1994–95 season, after complaints that he struggled with German. He reached the semi-finals of the Champions League, but failed to win any silverware.

Trapattoni coached Cagliari in the 1995–96 season. His first match was a 1–0 loss to Udinese on 26 August 1995. The club's board of directors decided to dismiss him in February 1996, after a string of bad results; Trapattoni was thus fired for the first time in his career. His final match was a 4–1 loss to Juventus. Cagliari were in 13th place at the time of his sacking.

=== 1996–2000: Back to Bayern Munich and Fiorentina ===
Trapattoni returned to manage Bayern again in July 1996. As Bayern manager Trapattoni won the German Bundesliga in 1996–97, the German Cup (DFB-Pokal) in 1997–98 and the German League Cup (DFB-Ligapokal) in 1997. He left Bayern at the end of the 1997–98 season and was replaced by Ottmar Hitzfeld.

Trapattoni coached Fiorentina from 1998 to 2000. With Trapattoni's expert guidance, Fiorentina made a serious challenge for the title in 1998–99, finishing the season in 3rd place, which earned them qualification to the Champions League, also reaching the 1999 Coppa Italia Final, but losing out to Parma. The following season was rather disappointing in Serie A, with Fiorentina finishing in 7th place, but Trapattoni led them to some historic results in the Champions League, beating Arsenal 1–0 at the old Wembley Stadium in the first round, and defeating defending champions Manchester United 2–0 and eventual runners-up Valencia 1–0 in Florence in the second round. They were ultimately eliminated after finishing third in their group behind the latter two sides following a 3–3 draw against Bordeaux in their final second round match.

=== 2000–2004: Italy national team ===
In July 2000, Trapattoni took charge of the Italy national football team after the resignation of Dino Zoff. He led the team to the 2002 FIFA World Cup, qualifying undefeated to that tournament.

Prior to the tournament, Trapattoni was surrounded by controversy after he omitted fan favourite Roberto Baggio – who had recently recovered from injury – from Italy's final 23-man squad, as he believed that the player was not yet fully fit. Italy were drawn in Group G of the tournament with Ecuador, Croatia and Mexico. They won their first match, beating Ecuador 2–0, but then suffered a surprise 2–1 defeat at the hands of Croatia. In their final group game, Italy drew 1–1 with Mexico, securing qualification to the Round of 16 with a second-place finish in their group, where they faced tournament co-hosts South Korea. Italy lost 2–1 and were eliminated from the World Cup, conceding an equaliser two minutes from full-time and losing in extra time with Ahn Jung-Hwan scoring the golden goal. The game was highly controversial with members of the Italian team, most notably Trapattoni and forward Francesco Totti, suggesting a conspiracy to eliminate Italy from the competition. Trapattoni even obliquely accused FIFA of ordering the official to ensure a South Korean victory so that one of the two host nations would remain in the tournament. The most contentious decisions were an early penalty awarded to South Korea (saved by Gianluigi Buffon), a golden goal by Damiano Tommasi ruled offside, and the sending off of Totti, who received a second yellow card for an alleged dive in the penalty area, all ruled by the referee Byron Moreno. Following the team's exit, Italy were criticised in the Italian and International press for their poor performance and ultra-defensive playing style under Trapattoni, who also came under fire in the Italian media for his tactics, which included initially refusing to play two of the team's star playmakers – Alessandro Del Piero and Francesco Totti – alongside one another during the tournament, and substituting a forward – Del Piero – for a holding midfielder – Gennaro Gattuso – in the second half of Italy's round of 16 match, in order to attempt to defend their 1–0 lead against South Korea.

Italy went on to secure qualification for UEFA Euro 2004 easily, but once again failed to impress at the tournament itself. They were drawn in Group C with Denmark, Sweden and Bulgaria. They drew 0–0 with Denmark and 1–1 with Sweden, beating Bulgaria 2–1 in their final group game. This led to an unexpected early exit from the tournament, despite Italy being undefeated. Denmark and Sweden drew in the group's final match, eliminating Italy who finished in third place of Group C, on account of goal difference. More specifically, Sweden, Denmark and Italy all finished with five points, with each team having defeated Bulgaria but drawn their two other games. As all results between the three teams in question were draws, both the points won in these games and the goal difference accrued in these games still left the teams undivided. The decisive tiebreaker was therefore the goals scored during the games between one another: Italy, having scored the fewest goals of the three teams, were therefore eliminated.

Trapattoni later said: "Sweden against Denmark, I remember the game. Do you know what Johansson [the then UEFA president Lennart Johansson] said? 'If this game finishes in a draw, we will open an investigation' Do you know if he made the investigation? I'm still waiting for the investigation." These comments came eight years later, in 2012.

Marcello Lippi replaced Trapattoni on 15 July 2004.

=== 2004–2008: Benfica, Stuttgart, and Red Bull Salzburg ===
On 5 July 2004, Trapattoni was named as new coach of Benfica. He led them to the 2004–05 Portuguese league title, which was the club's first in 11 years. Benfica also reached the Portuguese Cup final that season, but lost to Vitória de Setúbal. Benfica also lost 1–0 to rivals Porto in the 2004 Supertaça Cândido de Oliveira. Trapattoni resigned after the end of the 2004–05 season, saying he wanted to be closer to his family (in the north of Italy).

Trapattoni returned to management in the German Bundesliga in June 2005, by signing at VfB Stuttgart. However, during his 20 games at the helm, Stuttgart produced poor results. Denmark internationals Jon Dahl Tomasson and Jesper Grønkjær openly criticised their coach, claiming he was afraid to attack. Trapattoni immediately responded by dropping both players to the bench. With the atmosphere in the team worsening, he was sacked after just seven months, on 9 February 2006, reportedly for "not fulfilling the ambitions of the club". He was replaced as manager by Armin Veh.

In May 2006, Red Bull Salzburg announced they had signed Trapattoni as their new manager and Director of Football, along with one of his former players, Lothar Matthäus, who was to serve as Trapattoni's co-manager. Trapattoni initially cast doubt on this report, claiming he had not signed any contract. But three days later, both he and Matthäus signed and made their hirings official. As he had done with Benfica in Portugal two years before, Trapattoni managed to deliver instantly, winning the league title after a long period of failures for the club; he secured the 2006–07 Austrian Bundesliga, which was Salzburg's first in 10 years. At the end of the season, the club's board of directors unanimously decided to dismiss Matthäus, and Thorsten Fink became Trapattoni's assistant manager.

=== 2008–2013: Republic of Ireland national team ===
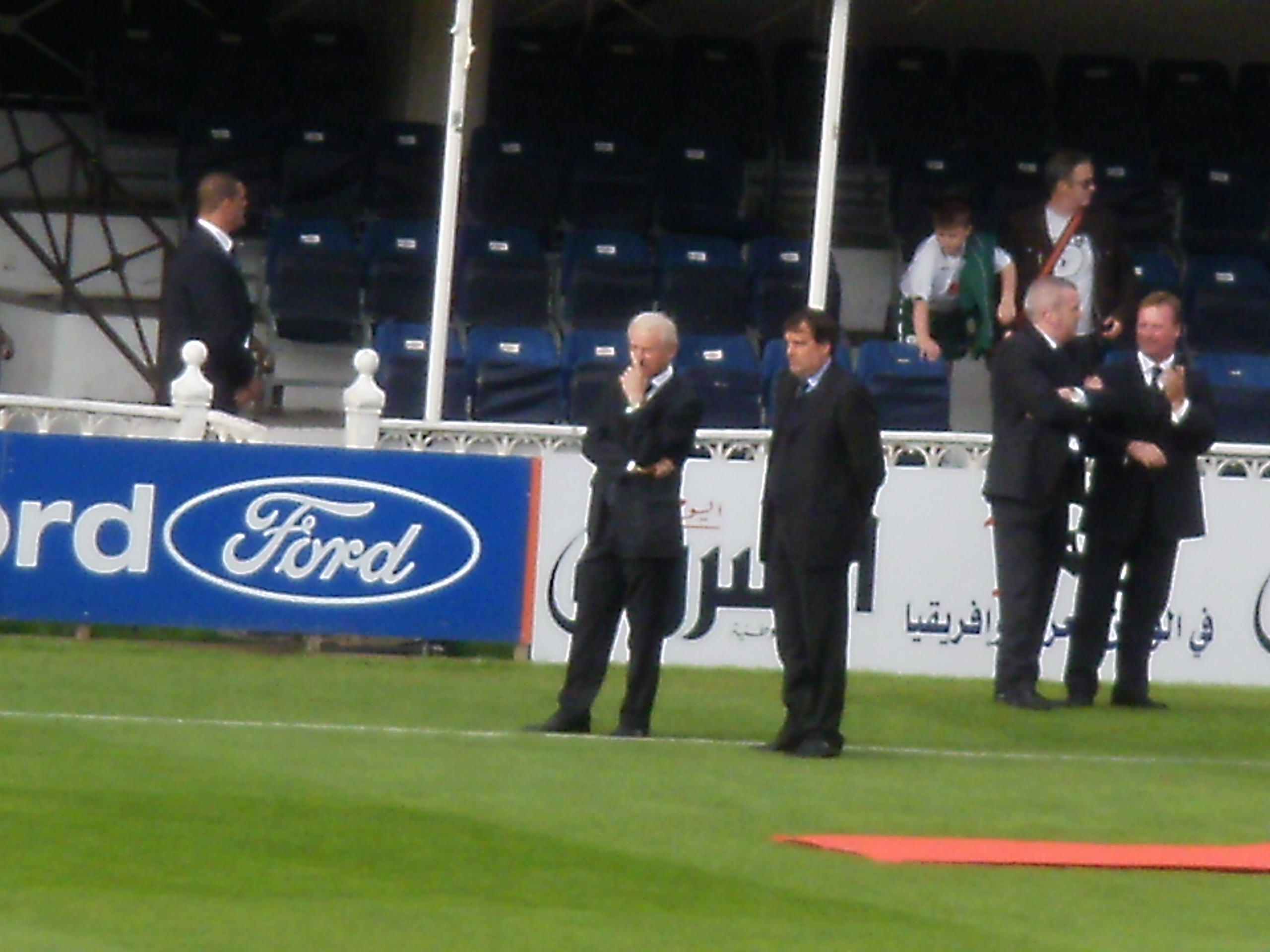
Trapattoni with Marco Tardelli as Ireland take on Algeria in June 2010.

On 11 February 2008, Trapattoni "agreed in principle" to take over the Republic of Ireland manager's job, but finished the season with Red Bull before taking up the Irish position on 1 May. Former Ireland midfielder Liam Brady was expected to be part of the Italian's backroom staff, while Marco Tardelli was confirmed as Trapattoni's assistant manager. Trapattoni signed Brady back in 1980 for Juventus from Arsenal for just over £500,000. Red Bull Salzburg confirmed, on 13 February 2008, that at the end of the 2007–08 season, Trapattoni would be leaving the club to take over as the Republic of Ireland manager. Manuela Spinelli became Trapattoni's interpreter because of her ability to speak both Italian and English, she became a familiar sight alongside him during most interviews. She also appeared on The Late Late Show without Trapattoni.

Trapattoni's first game in charge, a friendly against Serbia on 24 May 2008, ended in a 1–1 draw. His second, another friendly, against Colombia five days later, meant his first victory with the national side, 1–0. This was followed by a 1–1 draw with Norway, his first competitive win against Georgia and a draw with Montenegro in 2010 FIFA World Cup qualification.

Trapattoni's first defeat came in a friendly against Poland on 19 November 2008, a 3–2 loss at Croke Park. He also managed to claim a 1–1 away draw against 2006 FIFA World Cup champions Italy, that he had managed himself from 2000 to 2004, thanks to a late equaliser from Robbie Keane. He finished the qualifying campaign unbeaten, becoming only the third Irish manager to do so, qualifying for a playoff place for the 2010 World Cup.

In September 2009, he signed a new contract with Ireland that would have seen him continue as manager until UEFA Euro 2012. In the first leg of the World Cup playoff in Croke Park on 14 November 2009, France won 1–0 with a goal by Nicolas Anelka. In the second leg in Paris, on 18 November 2009, a goal from Robbie Keane levelled the aggregate scores at 1–1 in the first half. In extra time, however, a William Gallas equaliser put France through 2–1 on aggregate. Replays of the French goal showed that Thierry Henry had twice used his hand to control the ball and was in an offside position before crossing for Gallas to head home.

In May 2011, he managed Ireland as they won the Nations Cup, after a 1–0 win against Scotland. Later that year he managed the Ireland national team to UEFA Euro 2012 qualification, following a 5–1 aggregate play-off win against Estonia. Trapattoni was rewarded with a new two-year contract by the Football Association of Ireland (FAI). His success was praised by, among others, Dietmar Hamann.

Ireland exited UEFA Euro 2012 at the group stage, after losing to eventual finalists Spain and Italy. Early in 2014 FIFA World Cup qualification, Ireland suffered a 6–1 defeat to Germany at home with a severely depleted team available. On 29 May 2013, Trapattoni's Ireland side faced off against England for the first time in eighteen years at Wembley Stadium in a match which ended 1–1. Trapattoni parted ways with the Republic of Ireland national team on 11 September 2013 by mutual consent, after a defeat by Austria effectively ended their chances of qualification for the 2014 World Cup.

=== Vatican City ===
Trapattoni has managed the Vatican City national football team who are not a member of either FIFA or UEFA. His first match as manager was played on 23 October 2010 when Vatican City faced a team composed of Italian financial police. Previously, at the age of 71, Trapattoni was quoted as saying "When I retire, I would like to become coach of the Vatican."

=== S. Pietro e Paolo Desio ===
In 2015, Trapattoni was symbolically appointed S. Pietro e Paolo Desio's manager during the related patronal feast.

== Personal life ==
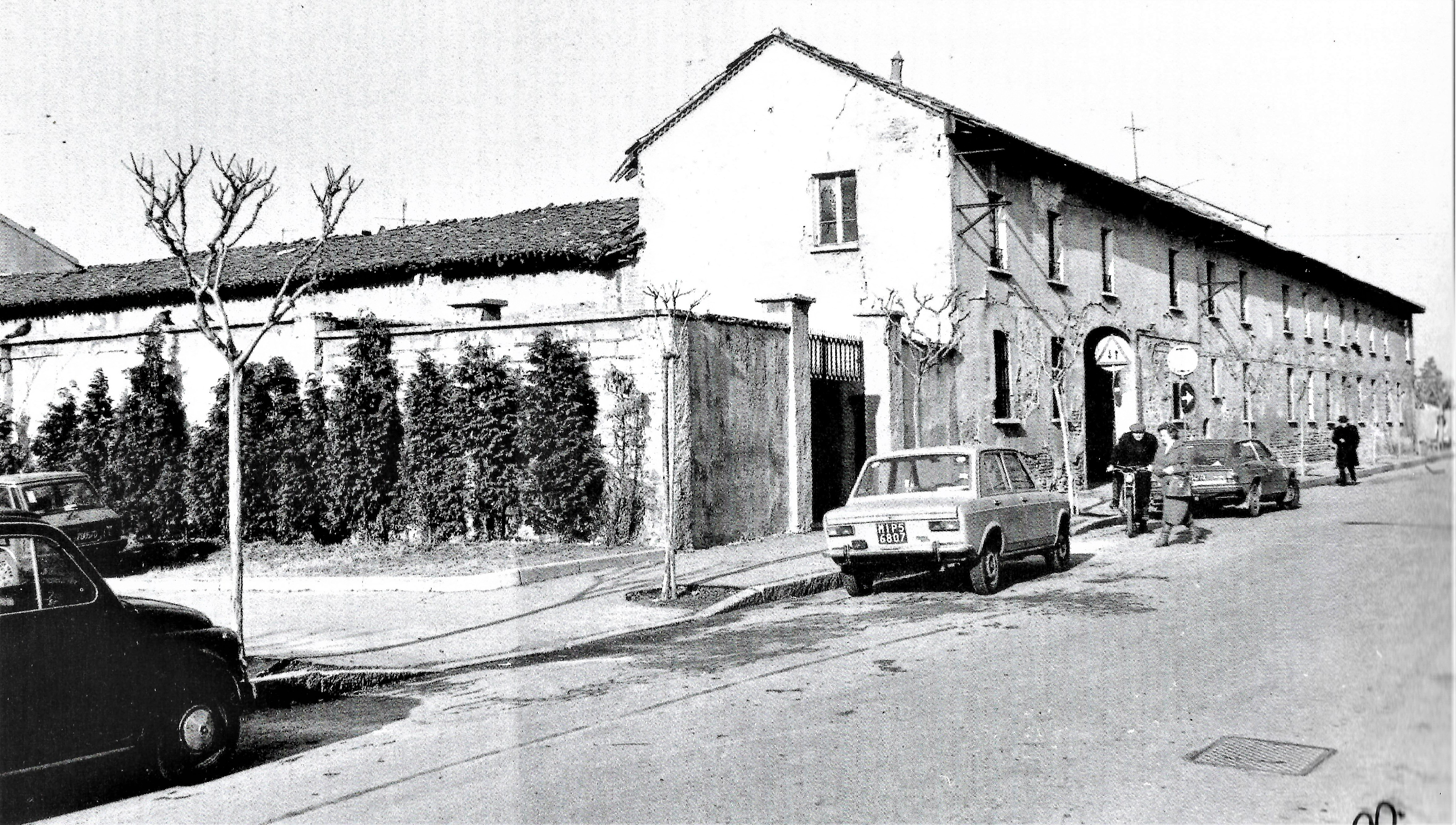
1981 photograph of Trapattoni's childhood house in Cascina Guarnazzola, Cusano Milanino

Trapattoni was born in a cascina a corte in Cusano Milanino near Milan, and comes from a working-class background. His father Francesco, a native of Barbata near Bergamo, worked in a silk factory and as a farmer, and died when Trapattoni was 18; his mother Romilde was a homemaker. He had one brother and three sisters; one of them, Romilda, became a Roman Catholic nun at 20 and died in January 2013 at the age of 83.

Trapattoni met Paola Miceli in the summer of 1960 in Grottaferrata, during the Rome Olympics. The two began a relationship and married at San Nilo Abbey in Grottaferrata on 3 June 1964. They had a son, Alberto, and a daughter, Alessandra, and later became grandparents and great-grandparents. Miceli died on 29 December 2022, following a long illness.

A devout Roman Catholic, Trapattoni regularly attends Regina Pacis Church in his hometown of Cusano Milanino whenever he is home and is a cooperator of Opus Dei. He has been on pilgrimage to Lourdes and Fátima.

=== Health ===
In August 2010, Trapattoni was admitted to a hospital in Dublin, one day before Ireland's friendly with Argentina. It was initially believed that the shellfish he had eaten before arriving in the country was to blame for him feeling unwell. He underwent surgery in the Mater Misericordiae University Hospital on 11 August, missing the Argentina game. In January 2011, Italian media reported that he was at home recovering from a mild stroke he suffered during a surgery on 28 December 2010, which had caused him partial paralysis. In a statement released through the FAI, Trapattoni confirmed that he did have scheduled surgery in Italy over Christmas, but disproved the rumours about a stroke.

== Style of management ==
"Our football is prose, not poetry."

— Trapattoni on his style of management

Considered one of the greatest and most successful managers of all time, Trapattoni is highly regarded for his man-management, motivational and organisational abilities, as well as his tactical acumen, being referred to in international media as "the King of Catenaccio" or the "Old Fox". He is known in particular for his direct management style and use of rigorous, innovative tactics, while his teams are usually known for their mental strength, organisation, and use of prepared set plays; Trapattoni was the main author and practitioner of the zona mista style of play (or gioco all'italiana), which was regarded as an evolution of the more traditional and defensive-minded catenaccio system, which had been popularised in Italy by one of his major influences as a manager, Nereo Rocco; Rocco's tactics mainly focussed on sitting back and defending, and subsequently scoring on counter-attacks with few touches after winning back the ball. The zona mista tactical system came to be known as such as it instead drew elements from both man-marking strategies – such as Italian catenaccio – and zonal marking systems – such as the Dutch total football; this tactical system dominated Italian football from the mid-1970s until the late 1980s, which saw the emergence of Arrigo Sacchi's high-pressing, offensive minded zonal marking system.

Although Trapattoni was known for his defensive minded approach as a manager, his teams often made use of a ball–playing sweeper or libero – with good technique, vision, and an ability to read the game – who was responsible both for defending and starting attacking plays from the back, as well as a creative and skilful offensive playmaker in midfield behind the forwards. As such, his teams were known for their defensive strength and playing style, as well as their ability to score from counter-attacks. In 2014, Trapattoni attributed his success and tactical intelligence as a manager to his time playing in midfield throughout his playing career, which allowed him to understand both the offensive and defensive phases of the game. Throughout his career, he used several different formations, including a 4–4–2, a 4–3–1–2, 4–2–3–1, 3–4–1–2, and a 3–5–2, as well as his fluid zona mista system; the latter system made use of a sweeper, a man-marking centre-back – or stopper –, two full-backs, a defensive midfielder, a regista or attacking midfielder, a second striker, and two wingers behind a lone striker or centre-forward, although players would often switch positions in this system, with only the stopper having a fixed role. During the latter part of his first spell with Juventus, Trapattoni also deployed striker Paolo Rossi out of position on occasion, either as supporting forward, or as centre-forward, but in a role known as a centravanti di manovra in Italian football jargon (similar to the modern false 9 role). The position utlised the offensive attributes of the club's new midfield signings Zbigniew Boniek and Michel Platini, with Rossi frequently holding up the ball or creating space for his teammates' runs with his movement of the ball.

Trapattoni was noted throughout his career for his ideological confrontations with more attack-minded managers he faced, most famously Johan Cruyff, a rivalry that started in their playing days, with Trapattoni remembering that, in order to stop Cruyff in a match between Italy and the Netherlands, he had to resort to "dirty" tactics, such as pulling at his shirt.

Trapattoni's tactics throughout his long and successful managerial career focused on some of the following themes:

- "A coach must train [the players] with simplicity and establish clear rules when building the team. This simplicity can be expressed through the formulation of a strategy with patterns and tactics based on the following principles: never haggle and delay excessively, pass the ball in depth to verticalise as quickly as possible, control the pace of the game, limit risks, mark behind the ball, use on-field tactical communication to help your players, be alert to the [opposing] team's weaknesses and strengths
- "The tactics must focus on the pressure to recover the ball and then quickly develop the offensive action"
- Ball possession is not important in itself and sometimes it can be counter-productive "like a person who talks too much". It is better "to have 0% of the possession and 100% of the goals".
- Strong emphasis on training the team in set pieces and dead-ball situations
- Instead of looking for space in the wings, as many managers do, it is more effective to look to exploit spaces behind the opposing team's backline through quick "vertical play" (gioco verticale). By inviting the opponent's pressing, the team can then easily exploit the spaces and gaps behind the opponent's defence
- The central area of the pitch, towards which statistically most of the possession is directed, needs to be very well-covered. There, the aim is to cripple the opponent's game and prevail on crucial second balls, thus easily creating "vertical and violent offensive transitions"
- Strikers must be trained to become clinical finishers or "killers" in the mould of Paolo Rossi or Filippo Inzaghi
- Tactical discipline is necessary, but the special genius of standout players should also be encouraged and harnessed to the fullest, with Trapattoni citing his use of Michel Platini and Roberto Baggio as primary examples.

== In popular culture ==
Trapattoni is a popular figure in Italy for his original press conference speeches and trademark quotes, one of the most famous being "don't say cat until you've got it in the bag". During his managerial stints abroad, his sense of humour, coupled with his difficulties with the local language, won him a significant amount of popularity with both fans and the press. A press conference which took place on 10 March 1998 while he was in charge of German club Bayern Munich has become known among German fans: in a speech riddled with grammar mistakes and involuntary neologisms, most famously using Ich habe fertig (German uses the verb sein ['to be'] and not haben ['to have'] to express 'I have finished'/'I am done') and Schwach wie eine Flasche leer ('weak like a bottle empty'), he soundly attacked many of his players, including Mehmet Scholl, Mario Basler and Thomas Strunz, whose last name sounds like stronz in Trapattoni's native Milanese dialect of Lombard, a swear word equivalent to Italian stronzo ('asshole' or 'piece of shit'). In a 2011 interview, Trapattoni himself explained his famous outburst thus:

There are certain situations in life when you need to raise your voice, and that press conference was one of those occasions. I deliberately raised my voice to make myself understood. When you have tired players, you substitute them for fresher players. People are used to this now, but back then in Germany, people wanted good players to play all the time because they were famous, even if they were exhausted. And I said No, players need to perform on the pitch whoever they are, and that is what the press conference was all about.

He is also known for the two-fingered whistle he uses to capture the attention of his players during games and for bringing a bottle of holy water during 2002 FIFA World Cup games when he was in charge of the Italy national team. He kept the same tradition while in charge of Benfica.

A 2003 song by Israeli musician Shlomi Shabat, titled BaHof Shel Trapattoni ("at Trapattoni's beach"), has the fictional titular beach named after him. The Hebrew lyrics of the song, a cover of Greek singer Sotis Volanis' Mia Nihta Mono Den Ftani ("one night is not enough"), were written in haste by Shabat after the completion of production of his 7th album, with the expectation that they will be replaced later. After several songwriters could not come up with suitable lyrics, at the insistence of the producer of the album, the version with the initial Hebrew lyrics was included in the album — conditioned by Shabat on the song being placed last and receiving no advertisement. Regardless, the song became the album's greatest hit, placing 28th in the yearly Israeli song parade of radio station Galatz, and remains popular today.

== Career statistics ==
=== Player ===
==== Club ====
Club performance			League		Cup		Continental		Total	
Season	Club	League	Apps	Goals	Apps	Goals	Apps	Goals	Apps	Goals
Italy			League		Coppa Italia		Europe		Total	
1957–58	AC Milan	Serie A	—		2	0	—		2	0
1958–59	AC Milan	Serie A	—		—		—		—	
1959–60	AC Milan	Serie A	2	0	1	0	—		3	0
1960–61	AC Milan	Serie A	30	1	1	0	—		31	1
1961–62	AC Milan	Serie A	32	0	—		1	0	33	0
1962–63	AC Milan	Serie A	30	0	2	0	8	0	40	0
1963–64	AC Milan	Serie A	28	1	—		2	0	31	1
1964–65	AC Milan	Serie A	30	0	1	0	1	0	32	0
1965–66	AC Milan	Serie A	18	1	1	0	2	0	21	1
1966–67	AC Milan	Serie A	23	0	5	0	—		28	0
1967–68	AC Milan	Serie A	24	0	9	0	9	0	42	0
1968–69	AC Milan	Serie A	22	0	5	0	5	0	32	0
1969–70	AC Milan	Serie A	20	0	—		2	0	22	0
1970–71	AC Milan	Serie A	15	0	7	0	—		22	0
1971–72	Varese	Serie A	10	0	3	0	—		13	0
Country	Italy		284	3	37	0	30	0	351	3
Total			284	3	37	0	30	0	351	3

==== International ====
Italy national team
Year	Apps	Goals
1960	1	0
1961	5	0
1962	2	0
1963	6	1
1964	3	0
Total	17	1

===== International goal =====
Scores and results list Italy's goal tally first.

#	Date	Venue	Opponent	Score	Result	Competition
1.	9 June 1963	Praterstadion, Wien, Austria	Austria	1–0	1–0	Friendly

=== Manager ===
As of 10 September 2013.

Team	From	To	Record							
Team	From	To	G	W	D	L	GF	GA	GD	Win %
AC Milan	8 April 1974	30 June 1974	10	2	4	4	5	7	−2	20.00
AC Milan	2 October 1975	30 May 1976	37	19	9	9	53	33	+20	51.35
Juventus	1 July 1976	30 June 1986	458	246	139	73	739	359	+380	53.71
Inter Milan	1 July 1986	30 June 1991	233	124	65	44	354	187	+167	53.22
Juventus	1 July 1991	30 June 1994	142	74	44	24	236	124	+112	52.11
Bayern Munich	1 July 1994	30 June 1995	46	17	18	11	68	59	+9	36.96
Cagliari	1 July 1995	13 February 1996	25	10	3	12	27	41	−14	40.00
Bayern Munich	1 July 1996	30 June 1998	90	54	22	14	191	90	+101	60.00
Fiorentina	1 July 1998	30 June 2000	100	44	31	25	149	109	+40	44.00
Italy	6 July 2000	15 July 2004	44	25	12	7	68	30	+38	56.82
Benfica	5 July 2004	31 May 2005	51	29	10	12	82	50	+32	56.86
VfB Stuttgart	17 June 2005	9 February 2006	31	11	13	7	37	31	+6	35.48
Red Bull Salzburg	May 2006	30 April 2008	87	48	19	20	158	85	+73	55.17
Republic of Ireland	1 May 2008	11 September 2013	64	26	22	16	86	64	+22	40.63
Career totals			1,418	729	411	278	2,253	1,269	+984	51.41

== Honours ==
=== Player ===
==== Club ====
AC Milan

- Serie A: 1961–62, 1967–68
- Coppa Italia: 1966–67
- European Cup: 1962–63, 1968–69
- European Cup Winners' Cup: 1967–68
- Intercontinental Cup: 1969

=== Manager ===
==== Club ====
Juventus

- Serie A: 1976–77, 1977–78, 1980–81, 1981–82, 1983–84, 1985–86
- Coppa Italia: 1978–79, 1982–83
- European Cup: 1984–85; runner-up: 1982–83
- European Cup Winners' Cup: 1983–84
- UEFA Cup: 1976–77, 1992–93
- European Super Cup: 1984
- Intercontinental Cup: 1985

Inter Milan

- Serie A: 1988–89
- Supercoppa Italiana: 1989
- UEFA Cup: 1990–91

Bayern Munich

- Bundesliga: 1996–97
- DFB-Pokal: 1997–98
- DFB-Ligapokal: 1997

Benfica

- Primeira Liga: 2004–05

Red Bull Salzburg

- Austrian Bundesliga: 2006–07

==== International ====
Republic of Ireland

- Nations Cup: 2011

=== Individual ===
- AC Milan Hall of Fame
- Seminatore d'Oro: 1976–77, 1985
- Premio l'Allenatore dei Sogni: 1992
- Panchina d'Oro: 1997
- Champions of Europe plaque: 2006
- Philips Manager of the Year Award: 2012
- Italian Football Hall of Fame: 2012
- ESPN 12th Greatest Manager of All Time: 2013
- France Football 12th Greatest Manager of All Time: 2019
- World Soccer 19th Greatest Manager of All Time: 2013
- FourFourTwo 14th Greatest Manager of All Time: 2023

== See also ==
- List of European Cup and UEFA Champions League winning managers
- List of UEFA Cup and Europa League winning managers
- National team managers with 100 or more matches
- List of UEFA Cup Winners' Cup winning managers
- List of football managers with the most matches
- List of Intercontinental Cup winning managers
- List of UEFA Super Cup winning managers
- Zona mista
