= Azeglio Vicini =

Italian footballer (1933–2018)

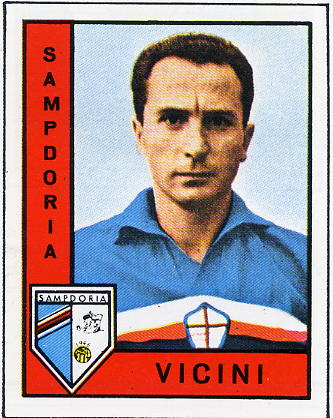
- Vicini with Sampdoria

Personal information
- Full name: Azeglio Vicini
- Date of birth: 20 March 1933
- Place of birth: Cesena, Italy
- Date of death: 30 January 2018 (aged 84)
- Place of death: Brescia, Italy
- Height: 1.75 m (5 ft 9 in)
- Position: Defensive midfielder

Youth career
- 1952–1953: Cesena

Senior career*
Years	Team	Apps	(Gls)
1953–1956	Vicenza	54	(8)
1956–1963	Sampdoria	191	(6)
1963–1966	Brescia	55	(2)
Total		300	(16)

Managerial career
- 1967–1968: Brescia
- 1975–1976: Italy U23
- 1977–1986: Italy U21
- 1986–1991: Italy
- 1992–1993: Cesena
- 1993–1994: Udinese
Medal record
Men's football
Representing Italy (as manager)
FIFA World Cup
Bronze medal – third place	1990
- * Club domestic league appearances and goals

Azeglio Vicini Grande Ufficiale OMRI (Italian pronunciation: [adˈdzeʎʎo viˈtʃiːni]; 20 March 1933 – 30 January 2018) was an Italian football coach and player, who also served as the President of the Technical Sector of the Italian Football Federation (FIGC).

One of Italy's most important coaches during the eighties, Vicini coached the Italy under-21 side, reaching the semi-final of the 1984 UEFA European Under-21 Championship, and final of the 1986 UEFA European Under-21 Championship; he later coached the Italy national side, reaching the semi-finals of UEFA Euro 1988, and leading the team to another semi-final, and eventually a third-place finish, in the 1990 FIFA World Cup, in Italy.

== Playing career ==
A defensive midfielder, Vicini started playing football with his hometown side Cesena. He began his professional career with Lanerossi Vicenza, helping the team to Serie A promotion the following season, after winning the 1954–55 Serie B title, and subsequently making his Serie A debut on 25 September 1955 in a 2–0 home defeat to Inter. He later moved to Sampdoria, playing with the club for 7 seasons in the top division, before moving to Serie B club Brescia. He made his club debut on 15 September 1963, in a 4–0 away defeat to Varese, narrowly missing out on Serie A promotion during his first season with the club. The following season, he won the Serie B title with the club, finally achieving Serie A promotion after 17 years. After suffering relegation, the team immediately won back Serie A promotion the following season. Vicini ended his playing career during the 1967–68 season, when he became the club's manager midway through the season, although he was ultimately unable to save the club from relegation, despite impressing with his performances.

== Managerial career ==
After starting his professional coaching career with his former club Brescia from 1967 to 1968, he was named the head coach of the Italian Under-23 side in his 30s, between 1975 and 1976, participating in the 1976 UEFA European Under-23 Championship, where Italy were eliminated in the group stages. He was later named the head coach of the Italy national under-21 football team, a position which he occupied between 1977 and 1986. With the Under-21 side, he reached the quarter-finals of the UEFA European Under-21 Championships in 1978, 1980, and 1982, and the semi-finals in 1984; he won the "Seminatore d'Oro" award, for the best coach in Italian football in 1986, after the team reached the final of the 1986 UEFA European Under-21 Championship.

He subsequently managed the senior Italian team from 1986 to 1991. He led Italy to the semi-finals of the UEFA Euro 1988, where they were eliminated by USSR. Two years later, he led Italy to the semi-finals of the 1990 FIFA World Cup, which was held on home soil, where they eventually finished in third-place, defeating England 2–1 in the bronze medal match. Italy won six out of seven matches throughout the tournament, scoring ten goals and only conceding two, with their only draw coming in their penalty-shootout defeat to defending champions Argentina in the semi-finals, following a 1–1 draw after extra-time. However, after the team failed to qualify for the 1992 UEFA European Football Championship, he was replaced as Italy's head coach by former Milan manager Arrigo Sacchi.

In 1991, he was awarded the "Panchina d'Oro" Award for his career; he later managed his hometown team Cesena from 1992 to 1993, and Udinese from 1993 to 1994, before retiring.

Vicini later took up the position as head of the technical sector of the FIGC; he was replaced by Roberto Baggio in 2010. Vicini was awarded the Premio Malatesta Novello by his hometown of Cesena in 2008.

== Style of management ==
During his time as Italy's manager, Vicini came to be known for introducing younger talented players to the team, and for implementing a more attractive, offensive-minded possession based system, which he successfully used to great effect, guiding Italy to two consecutive semi-finals at Euro 1988 and the 1990 World Cup; as such, he came to be known as one of Italy's most beloved managers. Under Vicini, the Italy national team's more attacking style of play was combined with a solid back-line and elements of the Italian zona mista approach (or "Gioco all'Italiana"), which was a cross between zonal marking and man-marking systems, such as catenaccio. Despite their more aggressive and modern attacking approach under Vicini, Italy were still pragmatic, conceding little defensively, while still creating more going forward.

== Personal life and death ==
Vicini was married and had three children. Vicini died in Brescia on 30 January 2018, at the age of 84.

== Honours ==
=== Player ===
Vicenza

- Serie B: 1954–55

Brescia

- Serie B: 1964–65

=== Manager ===
Italy

- UEFA European Under-21 Championship runner-up: 1986
- FIFA World Cup third place: 1990
- Scania 100 Tournament: 1991

=== Individual ===
- Seminatore d'oro: 1986
- Panchina d'oro alla carriera: 1991
- Premio Malatesta Novello – Comune di Cesena: 2008
- Italian Football Hall of Fame: 2017

=== Orders ===
- 2nd Class / Grand Officer: Grande Ufficiale Ordine al Merito della Repubblica Italiana: 1991
