= Possession value =

In football, possession value (PV) is a performance metric used to predict the probability of any possession resulting in a goal.
