= Enzo Bearzot =

Italian football player and manager (1927–2010)

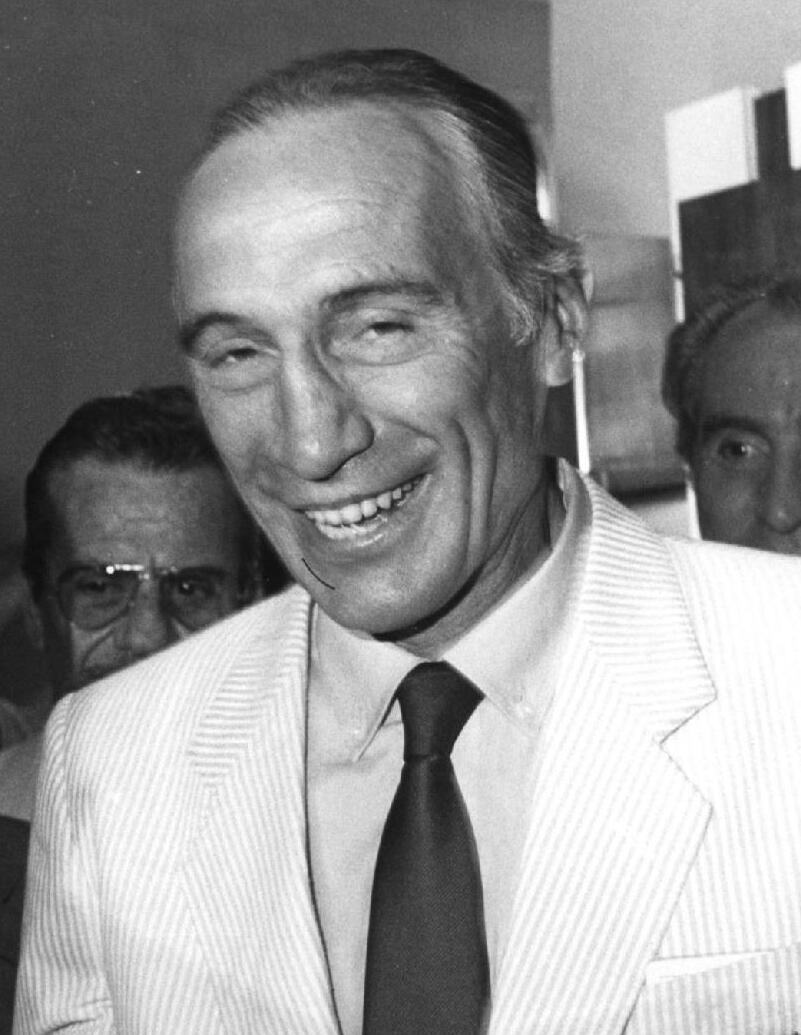
- Bearzot at the 1982 FIFA World Cup

Personal information
- Full name: Enzo Bearzot
- Date of birth: 26 September 1927
- Place of birth: Aiello del Friuli, Kingdom of Italy
- Date of death: 21 December 2010 (aged 83)
- Place of death: Milan, Italy
- Position: Defensive midfielder

Senior career*
Years	Team	Apps	(Gls)
1946–1948	Pro Gorizia	39	(2)
1948–1951	Inter Milan	19	(0)
1951–1954	Catania	95	(5)
1954–1956	Torino	65	(1)
1956–1957	Inter Milan	27	(0)
1957–1964	Torino	164	(7)
Total		409	(15)

International career
1955	Italy	1	(0)

Managerial career
- 1964–1967: Torino (youth)
- 1968–1969: Prato
- 1969–1975: Italy U23
- 1975–1986: Italy
Medal record
Men's football
Representing Italy (as manager)
FIFA World Cup
Winner	1982 Spain
- * Club domestic league appearances and goals

Enzo Bearzot Grande Ufficiale OMRI (Italian pronunciation: [ˈɛntso bearˈtsɔt, -ˈdzɔt]; 26 September 1927 – 21 December 2010) was an Italian professional football player and manager. A defender and midfielder in his playing career, he also coached the Italy national team to victory in the 1982 FIFA World Cup.

Nicknamed Vecio (standard Italian vecchio, 'old man'), Bearzot coached the Italy national team the most (104 times, between September 1975 to June 1986). He was noted for his phlegmatic personality and pipe smoking.

A year after his death, an award was named in honour of the 1982 World Cup winning coach, the "Enzo Bearzot Award", for the best Italian coach of the year.

== Club career ==
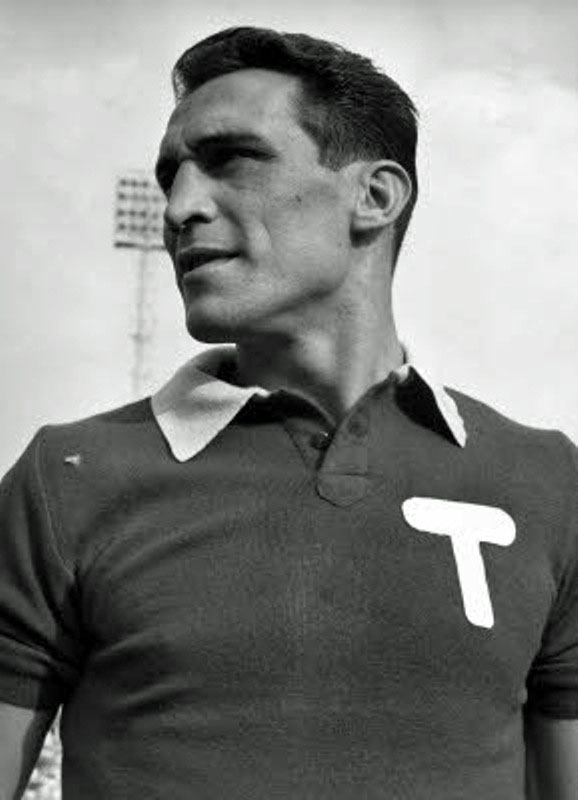
Bearzot with Torino in 1958–59

Born in Aiello del Friuli, in the Friulian Province of Udine in Friuli-Venezia Giulia, Bearzot was son of a bank teller and attended high school at Udine.

Enzo Bearzot made his debut in professional football with Pro Gorizia in 1946, a team he left in 1948 to join Inter Milan. After three seasons with the Nerazzurri, Bearzot moved to Sicily and joined Catania for three more seasons.

In 1954, he moved to Torino, which was rebuilding after the tragedy of Superga in 1949. In two seasons as a starter he played 65 matches, scoring one goal. In 1956 he returned to Internazionale where he appeared 27 times, the last of which was a 3–2 defeat at Bologna on 9 June 1957. The following year he returned to Torino. Here, he made 164 appearances and scored 7 goals for the Granata before retiring in 1964, aged 37, to take up coaching.

In his playing career, Bearzot totalled 251 appearances in Italy's Serie A, being called up once to play for Italy, making his debut on 27 November 1955 in a 2–0 1955–56 Central European International Cup match defeat to Hungary.

== Managerial career ==
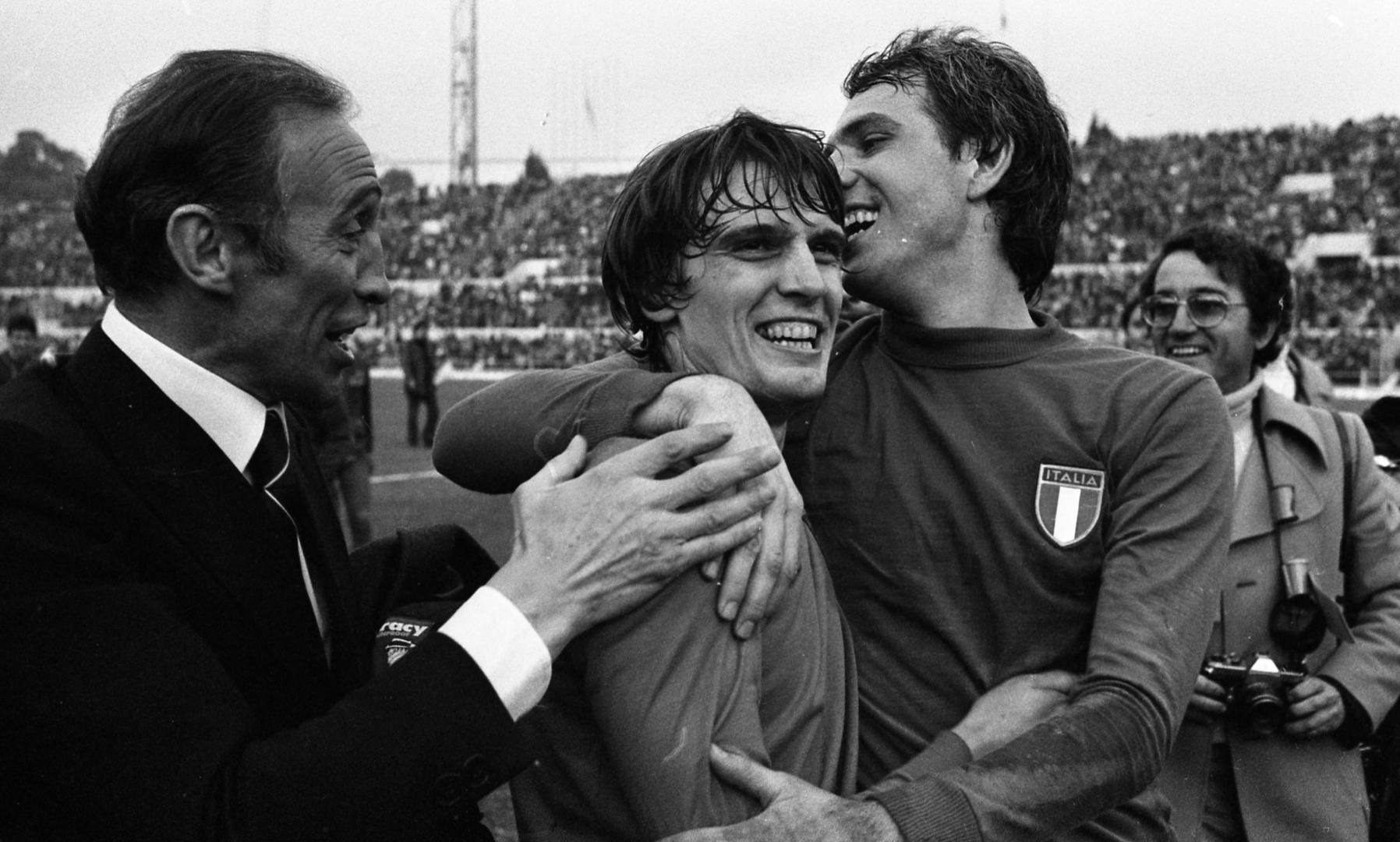
Bearzot, manager of the Italy national team, celebrates with Tardelli and Bettega after a victory over England in November 1976

After having ended his playing career, Bearzot became assistant coach of Torino, working alongside Italian managers Nereo Rocco and Giovan Battista Fabbri. He successively moved in Tuscany to take his first head coaching job in Tuscany at the helm of Serie C side Prato.

However, Bearzot did not go on a club career, and chose instead to start working for the Italian Football Federation: first as under-23 head coach, then as assistant coach of Ferruccio Valcareggi in the 1974 FIFA World Cup in West Germany. After the World Cup, Bearzot was appointed as assistant coach of Fulvio Bernardini, and was then promoted head coach of Italy in 1975. Bearzot drove the national team to fourth place in the 1978 FIFA World Cup in Argentina. This performance was repeated in UEFA Euro 1980, hosted by Italy.

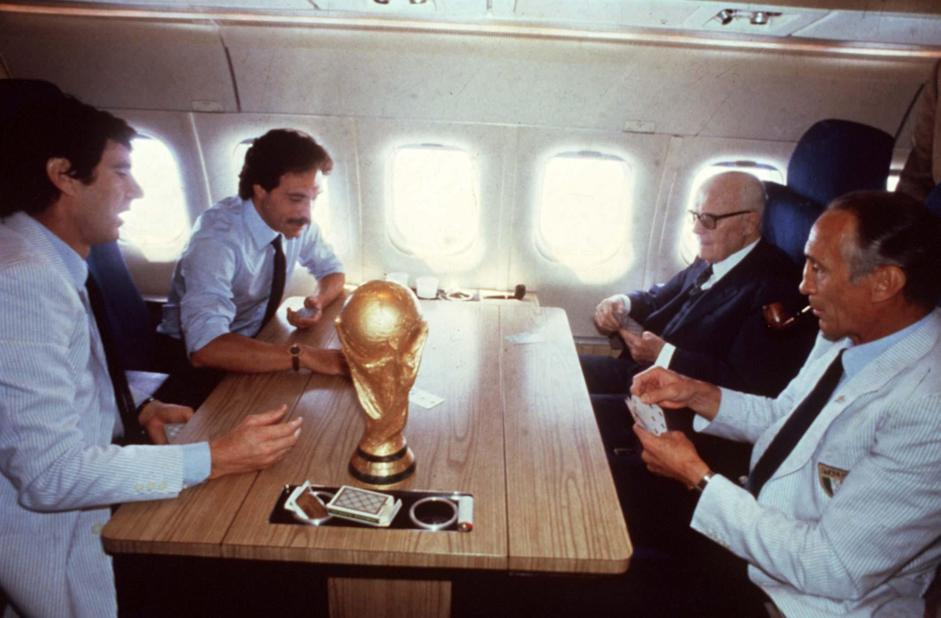
One of the widely remembered pictures of the 1982 FIFA World Cup is Bearzot (right) playing scopone with Dino Zoff, Franco Causio and Sandro Pertini, President of Italy

In the 1982 FIFA World Cup in Spain, after poor performances in the three first matches, Bearzot announced the so-called silenzio stampa (press silence) in order to avoid rising criticism from the Italian press. Following that, the Italian team finally started to play its best football, defeating Argentina and Brazil (see Italy v Brazil (1982 FIFA World Cup)) in the second round, Poland in the semi-final and West Germany in the Final, and winning the World Cup for the first time since 1938.

Italy did not qualify for UEFA Euro 1984 in France. Bearzot resigned after the 1986 FIFA World Cup in Mexico, which saw Italy being defeated in the round of 16 by France. Bearzot was criticised during the latter tournament for relying too heavily on players from the 1982 team, as some of them were past their best form by 1986.

He holds the record for the most times on the bench as manager of Italy, with 104 appearances.

After a long period of inactivity, Bearzot was appointed President of the FIGC Technical Sector (Settore Tecnico, the main football coaching organization of Italy) in 2002. He left this office in 2005.

== Style of management ==
Bearzot was highly regarded for his tactical prowess, meticulousness, and versatility as a manager. He often studied his opponents in great detail before matches, in order to plan out and prepare his team's strategy; he was also known for his ability to adopt different tactics, formations, and playing styles, depending on the style of play of the opposition, and for having the capacity to find a system which best suited his players. At the same time, he preferred not to impose set plays and tactical plans on his players, as he believed that above all, they should have the freedom to express their ability and individual talent. At the 1978 World Cup, his Italian side often adopted an attractive, offensive-minded possession game based on passing, creativity, movement, attacking flair, and technique, due to the individual skill of his players; the front three – made up of centre-forward Paolo Rossi, and wingers Roberto Bettega and Franco Causio – would also often change positions with one another, in order to disorient the opposing defenders.

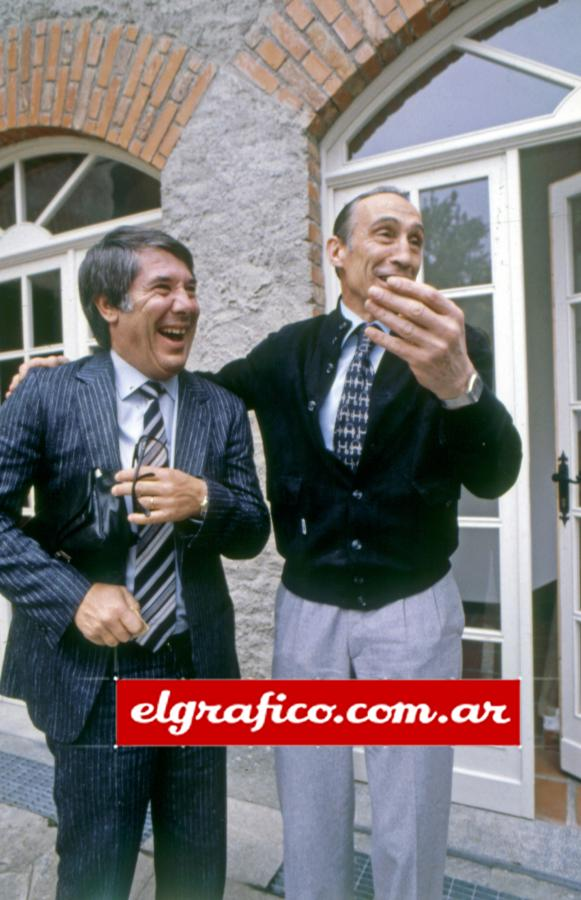
Bearzot (right) with Argentine former player Omar Sívori during an interview in 1980

At the 1982 World Cup, he usually used a fluid 4–3–3 formation, which was capable of shifting into a 4–4–2, 5–2–3, or 3–5–2 formation throughout the course of a match; in his 4–3–3 system, Bearzot usually used two creative wingers (usually Bruno Conti and Francesco Graziani, the latter of whom usually also served as a second striker) and a centre-forward (usually Paolo Rossi) up-front, a playmaker (usually Giancarlo Antognoni) and two hard–tackling box-to-box players (usually Marco Tardelli and either Gabriele Oriali or Gianpiero Marini – the latter two of whom usually operated in more of a holding role, while the former served as a mezzala) in midfield, while in defence, he used a sweeper (usually Gaetano Scirea) in front of the goalkeeper, whose responsibilities were both defensive and creative, as well as either three man-marking defenders, or two attacking full-backs and a man-marking centre-back or stopper; his team's defensive play was based on the zona mista system (or "Gioco all'Italiana"), a cross between zonal marking and man-marking systems, such as catenaccio.

In Italy's second round match against Brazil, Bearzot further demonstrated his tactical astuteness by changing Italy's formation in order to contain the Brazilian midfield and prevent them from dominating the match with their possession game. In the final against Germany, due to an injury to playmaker Antognoni in midfield, he also altered Italy's formation to a 5–2–3, by instead fielding Claudio Gentile as an additional man-marking centre-back, who would help left wing-back Antonio Cabrini to cover Germany's winger, Pierre Littbarski, while Cabrini would mark Germany's attacking right back, Manfred Kaltz; Italy's other two man-marking centre-backs, Fulvio Collovati and Giuseppe Bergomi, were dealt with the task of marking wing forward Karl-Heinz Rummenigge, and centre-forward Klaus Fischer respectively, while the sweeper, Scirea, was given the freedom to help double mark forwards, advance into midfield in order to win the ball and start attacking plays, or get forward. Due to the versatility of his players and their tendency to switch positions throughout matches, Bearzot's side were known for their ability to exploit spaces in the opposition; his team's defensive strength was demonstrated by his players' ability to cover for each other and anticipate their opponents in order to win back the ball. His side were also highly adept at subsequently creating goalscoring opportunities from quick and highly organised counterattacks after winning back possession, as well as being capable of keeping the ball and circulating possession in order to conserve energy.

In addition to his skills as a tactician, Bearzot was also known for having a close relationship with his individual players, as well as for his ability to motivate them, create a united team environment, and foster a winning mentality. In his obituary for Bearzot in The Guardian following the manager's death in 2010, Brian Glanville noted that "...Enzo Bearzot ... revitalised the national side. He imposed a far more flexible, adventurous style of play and led the team to victory at the World Cup in Spain in 1982."

== Personal life and death ==
Bearzot was married to Luisa; together they had a son Glauco, and a daughter, Cinzia.

Bearzot died on 21 December 2010 in Milan at the age of 83, exactly 42 years after Vittorio Pozzo; he was buried in the family tomb in the cemetery of Paderno d'Adda.

== Honours ==
=== Player ===
Catania

- Serie B: 1953–54

Torino

- Serie B: 1959–1960

=== Manager ===
Italy

- FIFA World Cup: 1982

=== Individual ===
- Seminatore d'oro: 1982
- World Soccer Magazine World Manager of the Year: 1982
- Panchina d'Oro alla carriera: 1992
- Inducted into the Italian Football Hall of Fame (posthumous honour, 2011)
- World Soccer Magazine 24th Greatest Manager of All Time: 2013
- Torino FC Hall of Fame: 2024

=== Orders ===
- 2nd Class / Grand Officer: Grande Ufficiale Ordine al Merito della Repubblica Italiana: 1982
