= Zona mista =

Association football tactic scheme

Zona mista (Italian for 'mixed zone'; Italian pronunciation: [ˈdzɔːna ˈmista], often referred to as mixed plan (modulo misto) and, in the English-speaking world, as the game in Italian style (gioco all'italiana); is a tactic used in Italian association football mainly from the second half of 1970s to the mid-1990s. The introduction of this system has been attributed to Luigi Radice and Giovanni Trapattoni, then coaches of Torino and Juventus, respectively. The tactic reached the highest sporting level with Juventus headcoached by Trapattoni becoming the first club in history to reach the European Treble having won the then three seasonal UEFA competitions and, in 1985, the first European side to win the Intercontinental Cup since it was restructured five years before, becoming world champion, and the Italy national team, managed by Enzo Bearzot, which won the FIFA World Cup in 1982, for the first time since 1938, with notable participation from the Blocco-Juve; making both teams acclaimed as among the greatest in sports history.

Regarded as the tactical evolution of catenaccio, zona mista requires each outfield player to perform, systematically and simultaneously, the zonal marking, the changing of positions and continuous attack on the spaces characteristic of Total Football, but also engaging in the defensive individual marking characteristic at the time of Italian football. In this system, a player who moves out of his position is replaced by another from his team, thus retaining the team's intended organisational structure, and each player performs a different function. Also, the effectiveness and speed of the transition between the defensive and offensive phases, in order to put the opponent's rearguard in difficulty, plays a more important role in the match score than maintaining greater ball possession. Several players, such as the sweeper (libero), the attacking full-back (terzino fluidificante), the returning winger (ala tornante) and the inside forward (mezzala) simultaneously play roles in both defence and attack, while the playmaker (regista) (e.g. Michel Platini, Lothar Matthäus or Roberto Baggio) regularly runs to the opponents' box to try to score. This flexibility made it much more versatile, fluid and offensive than the rigid standard scheme used in Italy at the time. Although it is one of the first to use four defenders, zona mista is aesthetically more related to formations which succeeded it: 3–5–2 and an asymmetric 4–3–3 system.

Zona mista proved highly successful at national and international level: with it, Torino won the 1975–76 Serie A, its first after the Superga air disaster; Juventus performed some of its finest football ever, setting the most enduring dynasty in the history of Italian football theretofore by winning six league titles and two cups in ten years. Juventus then extended this success to the international arena, starting in 1977 when the club won the UEFA Cup without using any foreign players, an unprecedented achievement for any country's team. Subsequently, it lifted the Cup Winners' Cup, the European Champions Cup, the UEFA Super Cup and the Intercontinental Cup, making it the first club to have won all possible official international competitions. These achievements lifted the Serie A for the first time to the top of the confederation ranking at the end of the 1985–86 season, a position maintained for the following three seasons.

== History ==
In pure zonal defence, every midfielder and defender is given a particular zone on the field to cover. When a player moves outside his zone, his teammate expands his zone to cover the unmarked area. However, the catenaccio philosophy called for double-marking when dealing with strong players. Zona mista combined the strength of zonal marking with that of catenaccio.

In zona mista, there are four defenders. A sweeper is free to roam and assist other defenders. A fullback plays in both defensive and advanced position, typically on the left flank. The two stoppers, who started then to be called "centre back", mark their zones. In the midfield, there are a defensive midfielder, centre midfielder and the playmaker (#10) and a winger who covers typically the right flank and sometimes acts as an additional striker. Zona Mista employs a two-prong attack. A centre forward plays upfront. A second striker plays wide to the left (a derivation of catenaccio's left winger) and drifts inside to act as a striker or to cover the playmaker when the playmaker drops into a defensive position.

The new Italian tactic came to dominate national football in the late 1970s and early 1980s and reached its height with the successful Giovanni Trapattoni's Juventus, and the Italy national team coached by Enzo Bearzot, mostly in their victory in the 1982 FIFA World Cup. Gaetano Scirea was the libero, Fulvio Collovati and tackling Claudio Gentile the centre backs, Antonio Cabrini the left wingback. Gabriele Oriali played as a holding midfielder, Marco Tardelli centre midfielder and Giancarlo Antognoni as playmaker.

Its popularity, however, eventually led to its undoing as Italian teams became predictable. Ernst Happel's Hamburg would expose some of the predictability of the style against Juventus with a defensive approach in the 1983 European Champions' Cup Final. However, the Torinese side continued to employ this tactic system with great success over the next decade under the management of Trapattoni and his former goalkeeper Dino Zoff, winning two Italian Championships, two national cups, one Intercontinental Cup, one European Champions' Cup, one Cup Winners' Cup, two UEFA Cups and one UEFA Super Cup.

== Skill ==
=== Tactical layout ===
In pure zonal defence, each player covers an area of the field, suitably for 4–4–2. According to the Italian school, it is preferable to handle highly skilled players by having one on one's own team who acts in the area and one ready to fix any errors. Zona mista faithfully reproduces the defensive techniques and most of the formation of catenaccio.

There is a sweeper, but because of the change in the offside rule, he must be very careful to move at the right time. At this stage, the sweeper can sometimes also become a playmaker, and lend a hand in the building phase. There are four defenders: clarification of the role of the free, it must be said that this is the fluidising left-back, having at its disposal the entire band, as it is the only cursor (over half the wing, which he controlled) . The other two markers were first called stoppers, later called centre backs; one is sometimes deployed back to even out the areas of the field covered.

In midfield, there was a half-back (mediano), a central midfielder (mediano avanzato) and a playmaker (regista), often called "the number 10", a concept which then spread, in practice a median-called "push", as it was not uncommon for advancing and would mark. Also in this department should be noted hairpin wing, wing to wing somewhere between offensive and an exterior; was in control of the other end (right), although, in some cases, it was considered an offensive player, often marked on the scoresheet, and then added a striker, who often changing of positions with the wing. In two-pronged attack, one usually used as support, the other added opposite wing (derivation of the left wing of the bolt), with a dash movement, regarded as a second striker, when a #10 half-toe when the playmaker became a defensive halfback (leaving the #10 the invention of the game, and stay longer covered in center field).

=== Positions and functions in field ===
As zona mista evolved from catenaccio, the numbers for each position were closely linked to British numbering.

The table below exposes the squad positions and its numbers according to the British style often used in national league and cups as long as in international club competitions, including variant numbering.

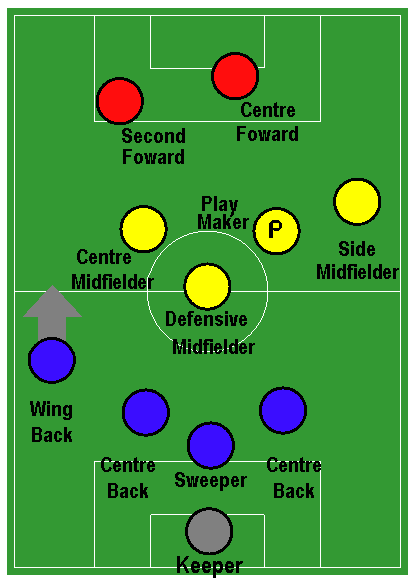
One of the tactical positions in the zona mista formation.

Positions	Number	Variant
Goalkeeper (portiere)	1	n.c.
Sweeper (libero)	6	5/10
Centre-back or stopper (Difensore centrale)	5	4/3
Pure man-marker (marcatore puro)	2	n.c.
Attacking full-back (terzino fluidificante)	3	6
Half-back (mediano)	4	6/8
Inside forward or centre midfielder (mezzala)	8	n.c.
Playmaker (regista)	10	n.c.
Returning winger (ala tornante)	7	n.c.
Second striker (seconda punta or "fantasista")	11	7/9
First striker or centre forward (prima punta)	9	11

== See also ==
- Association football formations
- Association football tactics and skills
