= Anti-football =

Playing style in association football

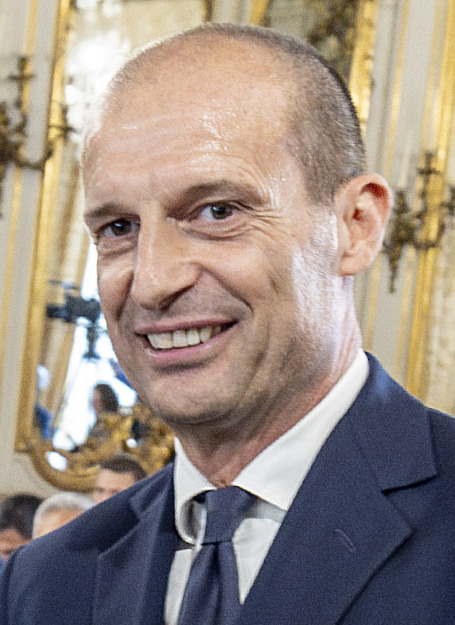
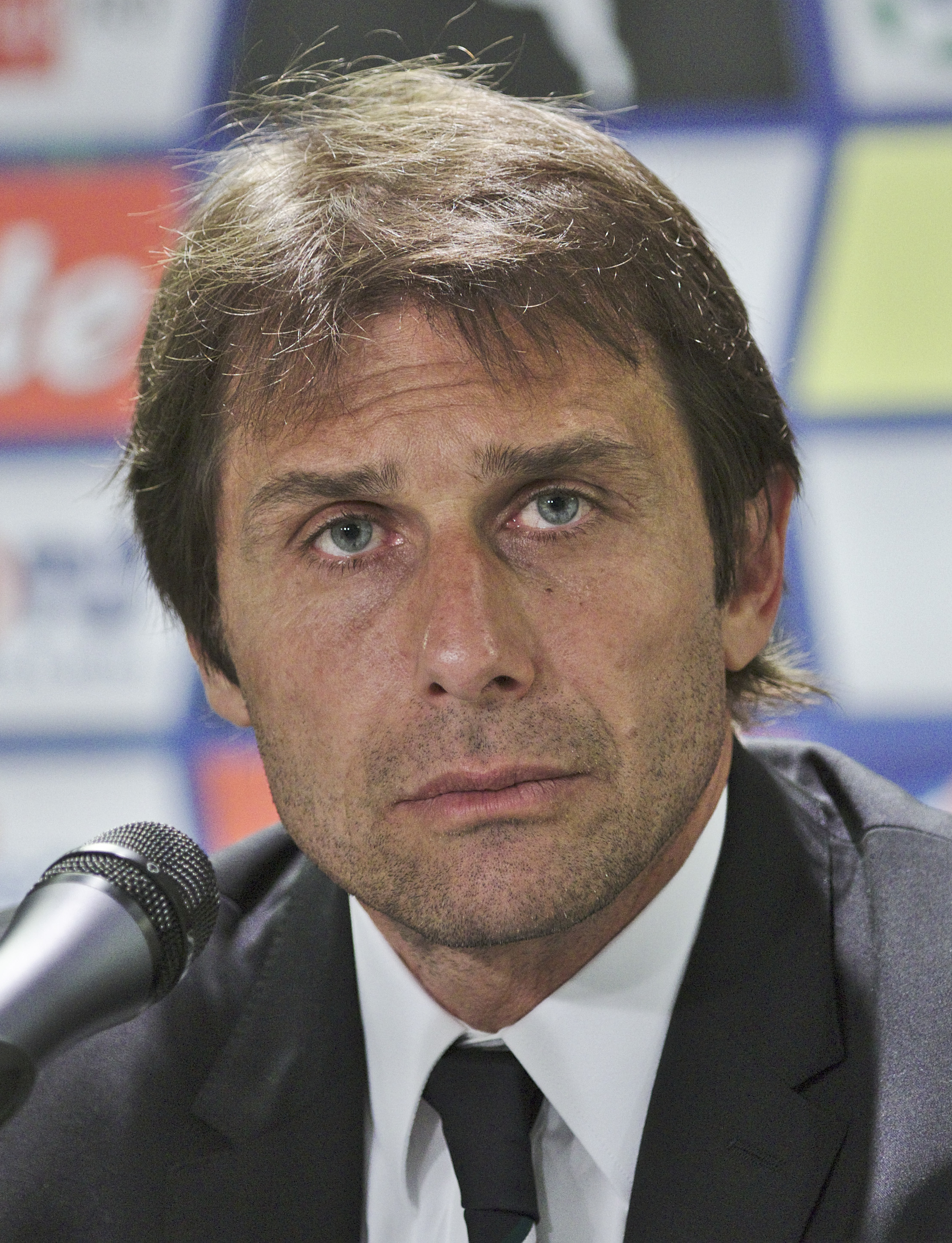
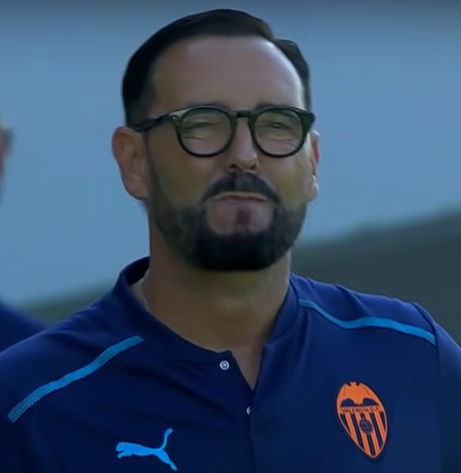
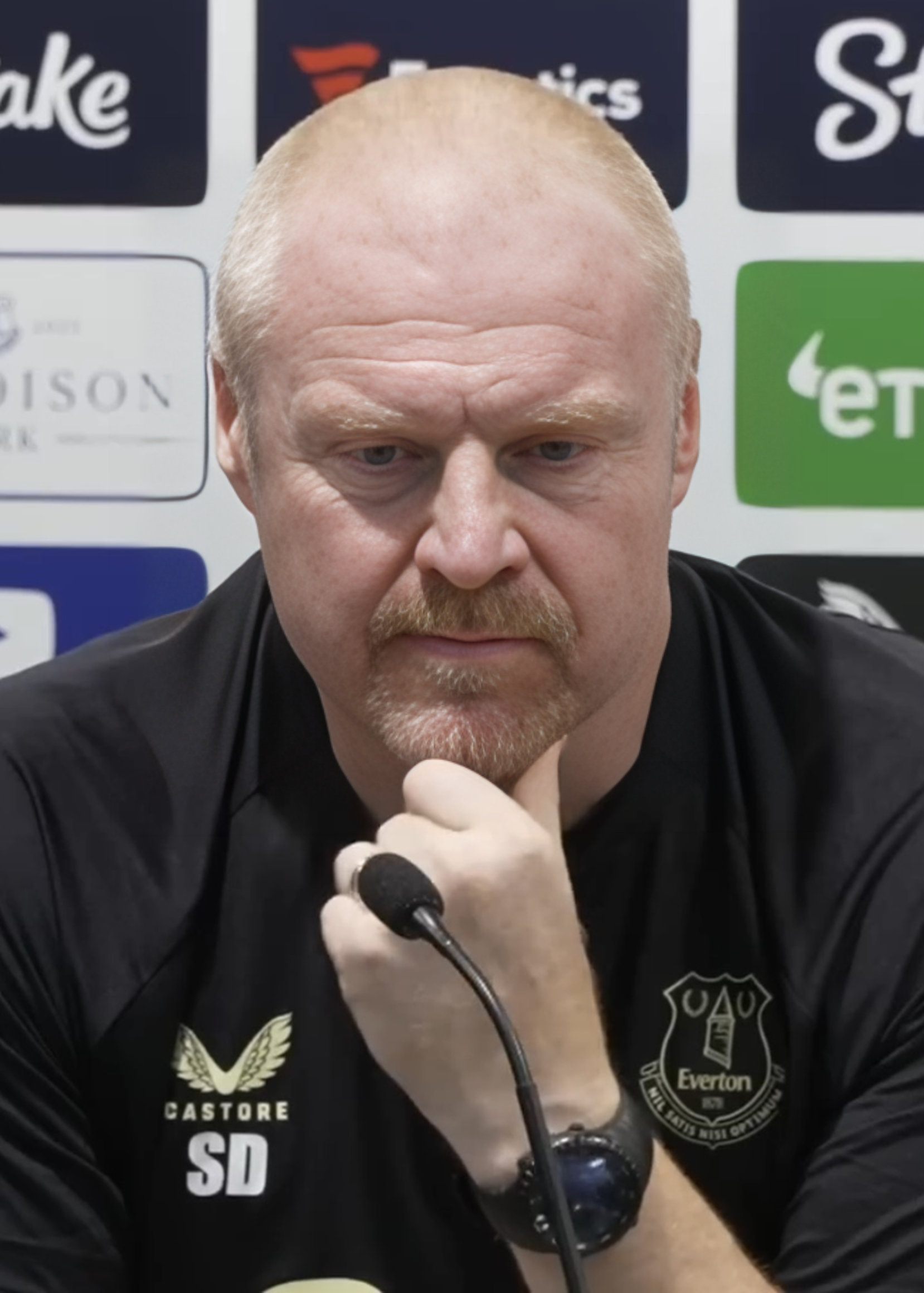
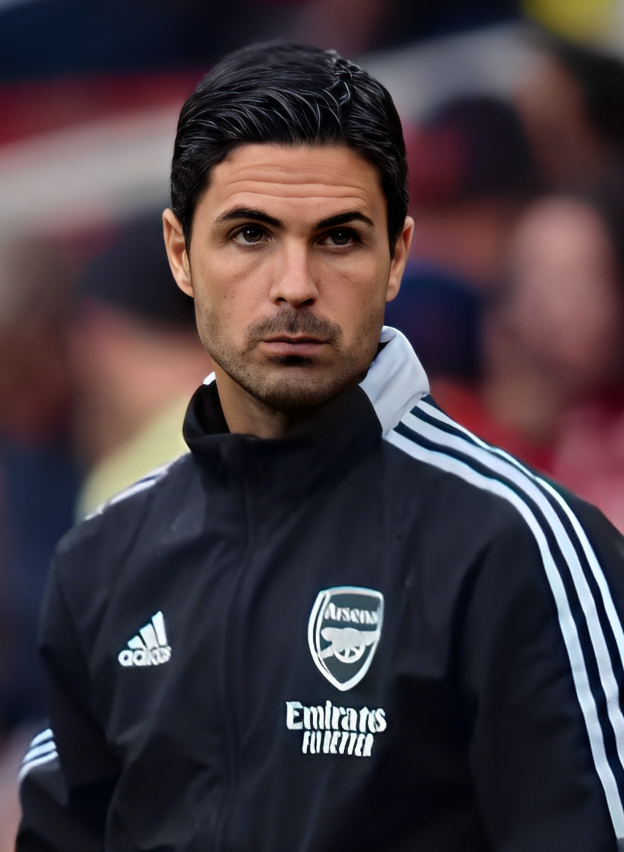
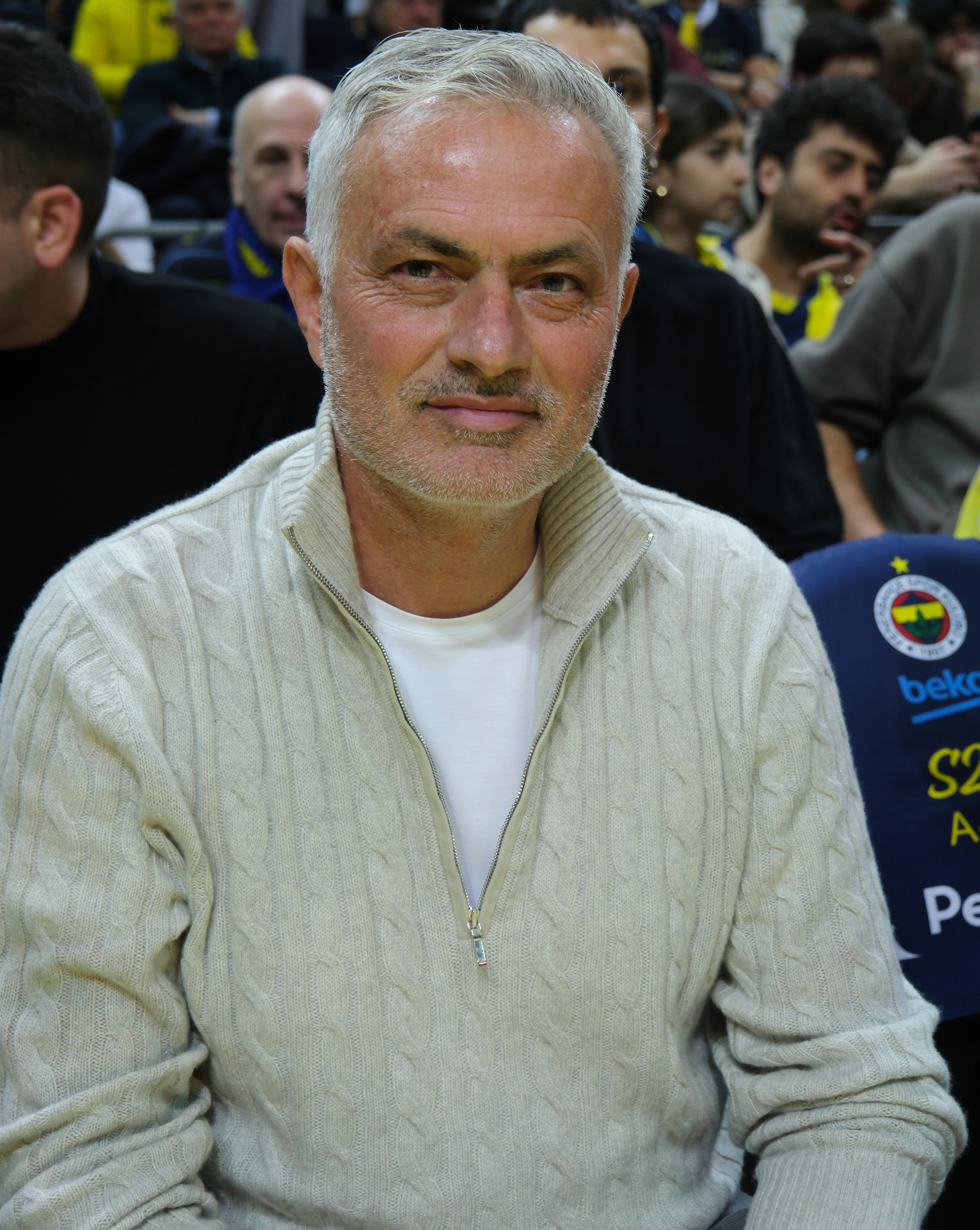
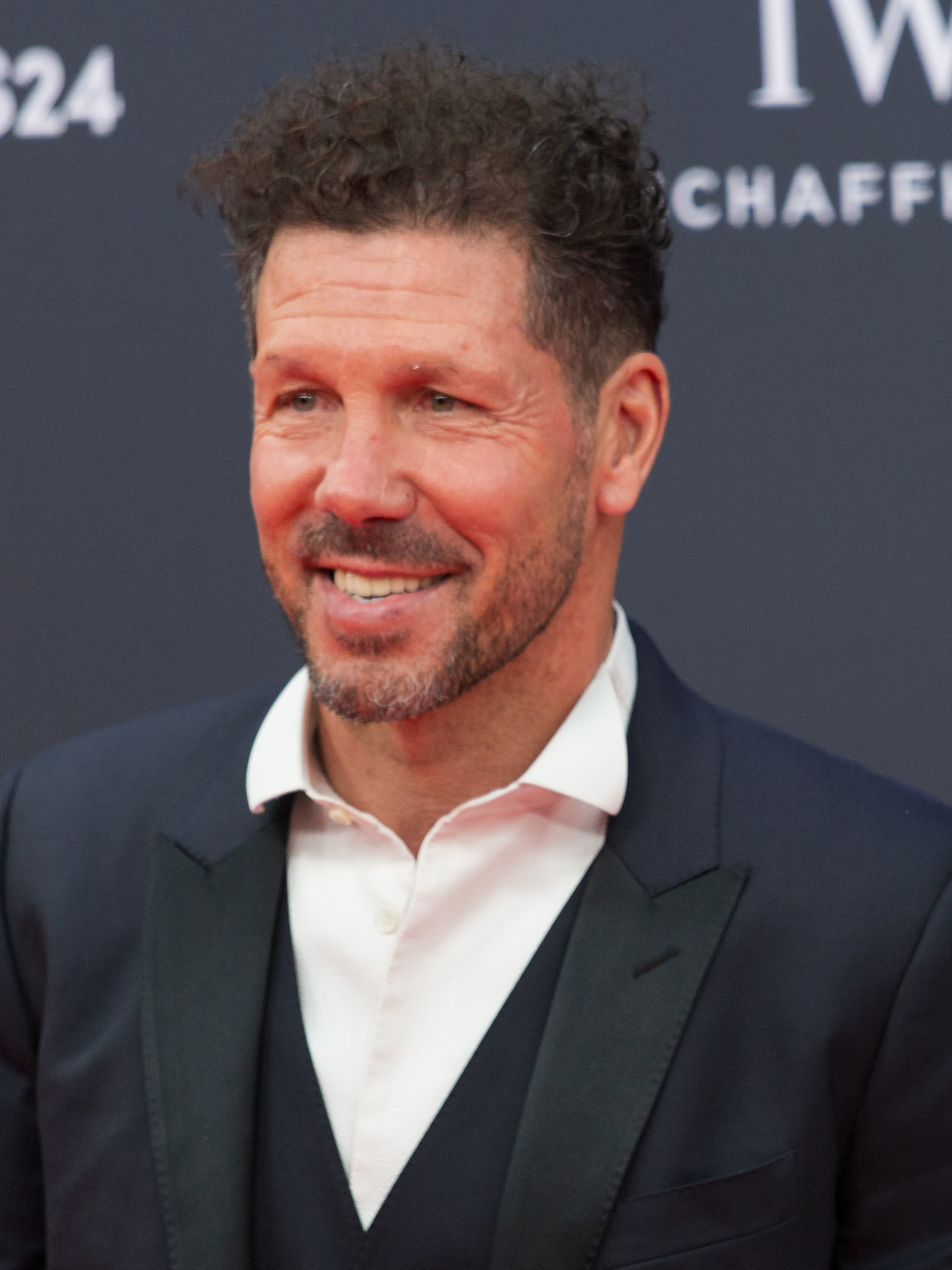
From left to right: Massimiliano Allegri, Antonio Conte, José Bordalás, Sean Dyche, Mikel Arteta, José Mourinho and Diego Simeone. All of these managers have been accused of playing anti-football.

Anti-football, also known colloquially as haramball, is a playing style in association football that emphasises a highly defensive approach, relying mainly on passing, set-pieces and involving the deployment of all team members except the striker behind the ball. The goal of the tactic is to prevent the opposing team from scoring, rather than pursuing an offensive strategy to win the game. Managers known for such tactics include Massimiliano Allegri, José Bordalás, Sean Dyche, Antonio Conte, José Mourinho, Diego Simeone and Mikel Arteta. Managers accused of playing anti-football usually deny using such tactics, though Walter Smith openly admitted to using anti-football tactics at Rangers following criticism from Lionel Messi after Messi's Barcelona drew 0–0 away in the 2007-08 UEFA Champions League (UCL) group stage with Rangers.

The term is also used to describe teams that intentionally prevent the game from progressing by kicking the ball forward without attempting to reach any players, engaging in acts of diving or time-wasting, and kicking the ball away during free kicks. By doing so, the teams aim to stifle progression by the opponent and reduce the amount of time the ball is in action. Accompanying anti-football sometimes is unfair behavior, overly harsh tackles, provocations and taunting (shithousery). Many of these actions often result in a yellow card by the referee.

UEFA, the governing body of football in Europe, offers a fair play prize to teams that prioritise fair play, including avoiding anti-football tactics. Teams that seek to "unlock" the game by playing offensively, taking risks, retaining possession and avoiding fouls, receive higher fair play scores. The three highest-rated teams in Europe automatically qualified for the Europa League from 1995 to the 2014–15 season. They continue to receive a monetary reward for their fair play. Although many have criticized such pragmatic tactics over the years, some managers like Mourinho, Allegri and Simeone have achieved success with their tactics while also gaining a cult following.

== History and usage ==
The term "anti-football" has been used in English since at least 2001, when Gary Armstrong and Richard Giulianotti used it in their book Fear and Loathing in World Football to describe the tactics of Argentine club Estudiantes during the 1968 Copa Intercontinental. They cited a 1968 editorial in the Argentine sports magazine El Gráfico that had used the phrase. The equivalent term "anti-calcio" in Italian is attested at least as far back as 1970.

Denmark after their 1992 Euros victory have been accused of conducting time wasting on a huge scale due to their goalkeeper Peter Schmeichel pushing the back-pass rule to its limit, especially in the final against Germany.

Arsenal's Cesc Fàbregas used the phrase to describe the style of play in the English Premier League after a frustrating 1–0 defeat to West Ham United. In 2007, Fàbregas had a heated exchange with fellow ex-Barcelona player, Blackburn Rovers manager Mark Hughes, who defended his team's style of play.

During their run to the 2008 UEFA Cup Final, Rangers manager Walter Smith deployed an ultra-defensive strategy dubbed "Watenaccio" (a reference to the defensive system Catenaccio, which was popularised in the 1960s in Italian football). The tactics drew criticism from opposition players, including Barcelona's Lionel Messi, who described them as "anti-football" after failing to score against Rangers in a 0–0 draw.

In 2010, Johan Cruyff applied the term "anti-football" to the style of play used by the Netherlands in the FIFA World Cup final against Spain. He criticised the Dutch team for renouncing their commitment to attacking and entertaining football and for playing "dirty". Other commentators had already described the Dutch style of play during the tournament as "anti-football".

Vietnam manager Henrique Calisto used the phrase "anti-football" after his team's defeat to the Philippines in the 2010 AFF Suzuki Cup group stage in Vietnam.

After Belgium's defeat to France in the semi-finals of the 2018 FIFA World Cup, Belgian goalkeeper Thibaut Courtois accused the French team of playing "anti-football" for their defensive tactics despite having significantly more shots on goal and less possession than Belgium. He later apologised for the comments.

The term "haramball" (haram meaning 'sinful' or 'prohibited' in Arabic) originated on social media in the early 2020s. The 2025–26 UEFA Champions League semi-finals between Arsenal and Atlético Madrid was mockingly referred to as the "Haramball Derby" on social media due to the managers of both clubs, Mikel Arteta and Diego Simeone, being accused of implementing anti-football tactics.

After their 2026 World Cup match against France, Paraguay were widely criticized for using anti-football tactics. Under the direction of manager Gustavo Alfaro, Paraguay played a 5-4-1 formation and committed themselves to defending the entire match, completing just 99 passes in the 1–0 loss. Many viewed their time wasting, diving, and excessive physical play as disgraceful and expressed disdain for Paraguay’s tactics. The refereeing was also heavily criticized in this match, as Paraguay did not receive a single yellow card despite their physical style of play.

== Managers accused of anti-football ==
The following managers have been accused of using anti-football tactics:

- Otto Rehhagel – German coach Rehhagel won the European Championship with Greece in 2004 emphasizing a very defensive, man-marked system and set-pieces, including Traianos Dellas as libero (sweeper), which at that time was considered very outdated. Especially the quarter final between Greece and France was considered the epitome of anti-football, as Rehhagel's tactics only aimed at taking Zidane and Henry out of the match. Confronted with criticism of his anti-modern approach to football, Rehhagel replied "Modern are those that win. [...] In football not always the better one wins".
- Walter Smith – During his stint with the Glasgow Rangers, Walter Smith often times invoked a defensive system against stronger teams which was called "Watenaccio".
- Tony Pulis – Pulis was strongly influenced by Italian Catenaccio football and, especially in his time at Stoke City, focused on defense, uncompromising tackles and set-pieces. Arsenal manager Arsène Wenger especially disdained Pulis and accused him and his team of deliberately trying to injure his players and called them a "rugby team".
- José Mourinho – Mourinho, while being one of the most successful managers in the 21st century, has long faced criticism for playing defensive and dull football that is mainly preoccupied with managing results rather than playing "good football". Different to other managers, Mourinho, who himself coined the phrase "parking the bus" while criticizing Tottenham Hotspur for their overly defensive style after a match in 2004, was unapologetic regarding his style of play. In that spirit, after the second leg in the semi final of the Champions League 2010 against Barcelona, Mourinho said that they didn't park the bus, but they "parked the plane".
- Diego Simeone – Simeone, manager of Atlético Madrid since 2011, is known for his compact defense and midfield, playing a very narrow 4-4-2, with an emphasis on forcing the opponent on the wings and enabling quick counters. Simeone is also known for his game management and set-pieces. His philosophy, also called Cholismo, instills confidence, an uncompromising mentality and tactical discipline in his players. During Simeone's tenure, Atlético won two league titles (2013-14, 2020-21), became runners up in two Champions League seasons (2013-14, 2015-16) and established themselves as number three in Spain.
- José Bordalás – Getafe CF under Bordalás has been criticized for their defensive and aggressive style of play, especially against stronger teams like Barcelona, Real Madrid and Atlético Madrid. Barcelona boss Quique Setién has said about Getafe "This isn't football. It's something else and it makes my blood boil."
- Sean Dyche – Dyche embraces tactics that are stereotypically attributed to English football like long balls and 4-4-2, which have been ironically titled "Brexit Ball" (similar to the Brexit tackle).
- Mikel Arteta – While coming from a tradition of Wenger and Guardiola, Arteta over time started adopting a more pragmatic, cautious and defensive style, which critics called an excessive reliance on low blocks and set-pieces, especially corner kicks. This criticism has gone as far as that managers, pundits and fans claim that Arteta's Arsenal "ruined" modern football.

== See also ==
- Parking the bus
- Association football tactics
- Total Football
- UEFA fairplay prize
