= Catenaccio =

Italian football tactical system

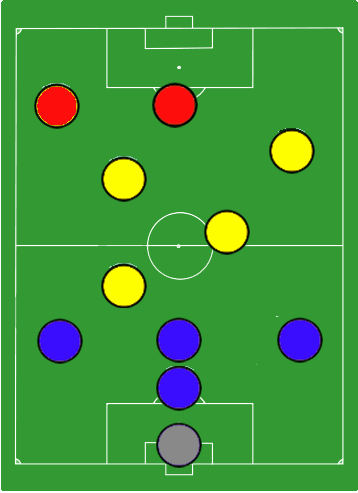
Karl Rappan's verrou, a predecessor to the catenaccio

Catenaccio (Italian pronunciation: [kateˈnattʃo]) or The Chain is a tactical system in football with a strong emphasis on defence. In Italian, catenaccio means "door-bolt", which implies a highly organised and effective backline defence focused on nullifying opponents' attacks and preventing goal-scoring opportunities.

== History ==
=== Predecessors and influences ===
Italian catenaccio was influenced by the verrou (also doorbolt or chain in French) system invented by Austrian coach Karl Rappan. As coach of Switzerland in the 1930s and 1940s, Rappan played a defensive sweeper called the verrouilleur (literally "the one who locks the door"), positioned just ahead of the goalkeeper. Rappan's verrou system, proposed in 1932, when he was coach of Servette, was essentially a modification of the 2–3–5 system, and in some ways resembled the modern 4–4–2 or 4–3–3 formations; his system implemented with four defenders, three of which were fielded in a fixed role playing a strict man-to-man marking system, plus an attacking centre-half, who would also act as a playmaker, in the middle of the field, who played the ball together with two midfield wings. The system was essentially a 1–3–3–3 formation, with the verrouilleur as the last player in front of the goalkeeper, and with the two outside forwards or wingers functioning as forwards high up the pitch, keeping possession of the ball and always looking to cross the ball to the central striker making runs into the box or looking to find a pass to the most forward midfielder making a run in behind the opposing defense from the midfield. (with the right winger sitting slightly further back), but who would often drop off into deeper midfield roles when possession was lost. The team would often sit back and defend during matches, which enabled them to overcome stronger teams or physically fitter opponents successfully. In his 2009 book Inverting the Pyramid, Jonathan Wilson notes that the "verrou ... is best understood as a development from the old 2–3–5 ... . Rather than the centre-half dropping in between the two full-backs, as in the W-M, the two wing-halves fell back to flank them. They retained an attacking role, but their primary function was to combat the opposition wingers. The two full-backs then became in effect central defenders, playing initially almost alongside each other, although in practice, if the opposition attacked down their right, the left of the two would move towards the ball, with the right covering just behind, and vice versa. In theory, that always left them with a spare man–the verrouilleur as the Swiss press of the time called him or the libro as he would become–at the back." Wilson notes that a weakness of the verrou system was that it placed excessive demands on the centre-half, as the player deployed in this role was required to attack and act as a playmaker when on the ball, while instead dropping back into the defence, acting almost as a centre-back, off the ball. With this system, Rappan won two league titles with Servette, and five more with Grasshopper, after joining the club in 1935.

During his time with Soviet club Krylya Sovetov Kuybyshev in the 1940s, Alexander Kuzmich Abramov also used a similar defensive tactic known as the Volzhskaya Zashchepka, or the "Volga Clip." Unlike the verrou, his system was not as flexible, and was a development of the 3–2–5 or WM, rather than the 2–3–5, but it also featured one of the half-backs dropping deep; this allowed the defensive centre-half to sweep in behind the full-backs, essentially acting as a sweeper. In Spain, starting in the 1940s and reaching great success in the 1950s, Helenio Herrera developed an early version of his 1960s catenaccio. With Atlético Madrid (1949–1953), he won two consecutive league titles with a defence nicknamed "the Iron Curtain". He kept on developing his system later on in other Spanish clubs until reaching his well-known 5–3–2 formation when he went years later to Inter in Italy (see below).

Italian Catenaccio has its roots with Mario Villini of Triestina in the 1941 season, Ottavio Barbieri of Spezia in the campionato Alta Italia 1944, and Gipo Viani of Salernitana in the 1948 season. Mezzo sistema was influenced by Rappan's verrou and originated from an idea that one of the club's players altered the English WM system – known as the sistema in Italy – by having his centre-half-back – known as the centromediano metodista or simply metodista, in Italy – retreat into the defensive line to act as an additional defender and mark an opposing centre-forward, instead leaving his full-back (which, at the time, was similar to the modern centre-back role) free to function as what was essentially a sweeper, or libero ("free" in Italian). Although this ultra-defensive strategy was initially criticised by members of the Italian press, including journalist Gianni Brera, Andrea Schianchi of La Gazzetta dello Sport notes that this modification was designed to help smaller teams in Italy, as the man–to–man system often put players directly against one another, favouring the larger and wealthier teams with stronger individual players.

In the 1946 season, Ottavio Barbieri introduced the sweeper role to Italian football during his time as Genoa's manager. He was influenced by Rappan's verrou, and made several alterations to the English WM system or sistema, which led to his system being described as mezzosistema. Gipo Viani, after him, called this "Vianema". His system used a man-marking back-line, with three man-marking defenders and a full-back who was described as a terzino volante (or vagante, as noted at the time by former footballer and Gazzetta dello Sport journalist Renzo De Vecchi); the latter position was essentially a libero. The team's midfield played in a triangular shape, with the centre-half-back or metodista fielded in front of the back-line. His formation also made use of three forwards in attacking trident, but the right-sided winger was also tasked with assisting the midfield defensively, and therefore acted in the manner of a right-sided wide midfielder, known as the tornante in Italian football.

=== Italian catenaccio ===
In the late 1950s, Nereo Rocco's Padova pioneered a modified catenaccio tactics in Italy where it would be used again by other Italian teams throughout the 1960s; his strategy was initially also known as the mezzosistema, as, like the vianema, it modified elements of the sistema. Rocco's tactic, often referred to as the real Catenaccio, was shown first in 1947 with Triestina: the most common mode of operation was a 1–3–3–3 formation with a strictly defensive team approach, while his team would look to score by starting quick counter-attacks with long balls after winning back possession. With catenaccio, Triestina finished the Serie A tournament in a surprising second place. Some variations include 1–4–4–1 and 1–4–3–2 formations. He later had great success with Milan using the catenaccio system during the 60s and 1970s, winning several titles, including two Serie A titles, three Coppa Italia titles, two European Cups, two European Cup Winners' Cups, and an Intercontinental Cup.

Alfredo Foni used the catenaccio tactic successfully with Inter during the early 1950s; unlike Rocco, the teams's strong defensive play off the ball did not limit the offensive manner in which his team played while in possession of the ball. In his system, his team's right winger, Gino Armano, would drop back to mark the opposing team's left winger (essentially acting as a tornante), allowing Ivano Blason, the right-back, to shift across and act as a sweeper and clear balls away. Blason also played as a sweeper under Rocco; as such, he is often considered to be the first true sweeper in Italian football. The key innovation of Catenaccio was the introduction of the role of a libero defender (sweeper) who was positioned behind a line of three defenders. The sweeper's role was to recover loose balls, nullify the opponent's striker and double-mark when necessary. Another important innovation was the counter-attack, mainly based on long passes from the defence.

In Helenio Herrera's version of catenaccio in the 1960s, he used a 5–3–2 formation, in which four man-marking defenders were tightly assigned to the opposing attackers while an extra player, the sweeper, would pick up any loose ball that escaped the coverage of the defenders. The emphasis of this system in Italian football spawned the rise of many top Italian defenders who became known for their hard-tackling and ruthless defending. Despite the defensive connotations, Herrera claimed shortly before his death that the system was more attacking than people remembered, saying "the problem is that most of the people who copied me copied me wrongly. They forgot to include the attacking principles that my Catenaccio included. I had Picchi as a sweeper, yes, but I also had Facchetti, the first full back to score as many goals as a forward." Although his Grande Inter side were known primarily for their defensive strength, they were equally renowned for their ability to score goals with few touches from fast, sudden counter-attacks, due to Herrera's innovative use of attacking, overlapping full-backs. Under Herrera, Inter enjoyed a highly successful spell, which saw them win three Serie A titles, two European Cups, and two Intercontinental Cups.

Manager Ferruccio Valcareggi used tactics inspired by the Italian catenaccio system, which was popularised by Inter manager Herrera during the 1960s, with the Italy national team, employing a sweeper behind two man–marking central defenders and a full-back, as well as a strategy which made use of heavy defending, focussing predominantly on stability, grinding out results while conceding few goals and defending narrow leads; although his tactics were controversial – in particular as during the 1970 World Cup in Mexico, he devised his infamous staffetta (relay) policy of playing one of his two star playmakers, Sandro Mazzola and Gianni Rivera, in each half, to avoid offsetting the defensive balance within his team – and not particularly exciting, they proved to be effective. Moreover, although at times he drew criticism in the Italian media over Italy's dull, slow gameplay and lack of goals, Italy also demonstrated their offensive capabilities throughout the tournament, as well as their technical capabilities, which enabled them to conserve energy and cope with the altitude in Mexico. He had a successful spell as Italy's manager, winning UEFA Euro 1968 on home soil, and leading Italy to the 1970 World Cup final; however, in the latter match, Italy suffered a heavy 4–1 defeat to a much more offensive minded and stylish Brazilian side. His team adopted a more attractive playing style in the lead-up to the 1974 World Cup, which saw them considered among the favourites to win, but suffered a surprising first-round elimination in the final tournament.

=== Decline of catenaccio with the advent of total football, and the birth of zona mista ===
Jock Stein's Celtic defeated the catenaccio system in the 1967 European Cup Final with a highly offensive strategy. They beat Herrera's Inter Milan 2–1 on 25 May 1967, creating the blue print for Rinus Michels' total football, a continuation of Stein's free flowing attacking football. Total Football, which was invented by Dutch manager Rinus Michels in the 1970s, exposed the weaknesses of the Catenaccio system. Unlike previous systems, in Total Football, no out–field player is fixed in their nominal role; anyone can assume in the field the duties of an attacker, a midfielder or a defender, depending on the play. Due to players often switching positions with one another, man-marking strategies, such as catenaccio, were no longer effective at coping with this fluid system. Despite previously losing out 4–1 to Milan in the 1969 European Cup Final, who were managed by Rocco, a manager known for his defensive catenaccio strategy, in 1972, Michels' Ajax defeated Inter 2–0 in the European Cup final, and Dutch newspapers announced the "destruction of Catenaccio" at the hands of Total Football. The following year, Ajax defeated Cesare Maldini's Milan 6–0 in the second leg of the European Super Cup, in a match in which the defensive catenaccio system employed by Milan was unable to stop Ajax, which saw the Dutch side win the title 6–1 on aggregate; this was the worst defeat for an Italian team in an UEFA competition final.

As man-marking alone was insufficient to cope with the fluidity of total football, coaches consequently began to create a new tactical system that mixed man-marking with zonal defence in order to counter this strategy, which came to be known as zona mista ("mixed zone" in Italian), or gioco all'italiana ("gameplay in the Italian manner" in Italian), in Italian football, as it mixed elements of Italian catenaccio (man-marking) with elements of total football (zonal marking). Italian manager Giovanni Trapattoni, who had played under Rocco at Milan, and was initially influenced by Rocco's catenaccio system, was one of the main proponents of this system from the 1970s onwards, and used it to great success.

== Modern use of catenaccio ==
=== Derivative defensive strategies ===
Highly defensive structures with little attacking intent – which are colloquially often referred to as "anti-football" or "parking the bus", and which have been employed at times by managers such as Jose Mourinho and Diego Simeone – are often arbitrarily and incorrectly labelled as Catenaccio by pundits, managers, and players, but this deviates from the original design of the system; while catenaccio was similarly an organised system that involved tactical discipline and deep, heavy, and patient defending off – or even behind – the ball, it also made use of now obsolete man-to-man marking, a sweeper, who was tasked with protecting the back-line and also starting plays after winning back possession, as well as employing sudden counter-attacks to score goals.

=== Italian football ===
Although Catenaccio has still come to be associated with the Italy national side and Italian club teams, due to its historic association with Italian football, it is actually used quite infrequently by Serie A and Italy national teams in contemporary football, who instead currently prefer to apply balanced tactics and formations, mostly using the 5–3–2 or 3–5–2 system. For example, under manager Cesare Prandelli, the Italy national team also initially used the 3–5–2 formation, which had been popularised by Juventus manager Antonio Conte throughout the previous Serie A season following his success in the league; although Prandelli used a ball–playing sweeper, he also used attacking wing-backs and a more offensive–minded approach with Italy. In their first two clashes of UEFA Euro 2012 Group C, the system resulted in two 1–1 draws against Spain and Croatia. He subsequently switched to a stylish attacking possession-based system using their 'standard' 4–4–2 diamond formation for the knockout stages; the switch proved to be effective, as the team went on to reach the final, where they suffered defeat to a similarly more offensive-minded Spain side, who used a possession–based strategy based on passing known as tiki-taka. Rob Smyth of The Guardian was critical of Spain's striker–less formation and particular brand of tiki-taka at UEFA Euro 2012, believing that the lack of emphasis on the offensive aspect of the game led to fewer goals, and that the team's seemingly endless passing and preoccupation with ball–possession was in fact boring, dubbing it "Tiki-takanaccio", a reference to the defensive–minded catenaccio tactical system, despite the fact that tiki-taka had ironically originated from the more offensive minded Dutch total football strategy. Prandelli did make use of a more organised and defensive 3–4–3 formation against Spain during the 2013 FIFA Confederations Cup semi-final, attempting to stifle Spain's possession game by reducing spaces, and subsequently hitting them on the counter-attack; the system proved to be more effective, as Italy created several opportunities and were only eliminated on penalties following a goalless draw.

Several of Italy's previous coaches, such as Cesare Maldini and Giovanni Trapattoni, used elements of catenaccio to a greater extent at international level, and both failed to go far in the tournaments in which they took part; under Maldini, Italy lost on penalties to hosts France in the 1998 FIFA World Cup quarter-finals, following a 0–0 draw, while Trapattoni lost early in the second round of the 2002 FIFA World Cup to co-hosts South Korea on a golden goal, and subsequently suffered a first-round elimination at UEFA Euro 2004. Other Italian managers have often deviated from the catenaccio system, despite still employing aspects of the strategy into their gameplay, and maintaining a strong defensive unit. While Dino Zoff's 5–2–1–2 system initially largely differed from the more defensive-minded approach of his predecessors who were in charge of the Italy national side, by introducing younger players and adopting a more attractive and offensive-minded approach, he also made use of a sweeper, a tight back-line, and put Catenaccio to good use for Italy in the semi-final of UEFA Euro 2000 against co-hosts Netherlands, when the team went down to ten men; despite coming under criticism in the media for his defensive playing style during the match, following a penalty shoot-out victory after a 0–0 draw, he secured a place in the final. In the final, Italy only lost on the golden goal rule to France.

Previously, Azeglio Vicini, on the other hand, had led Italy to the semi-finals of both UEFA Euro 1988 and the 1990 FIFA World Cup, on home soil, thanks to a more attractive, offensive-minded possession based system, which was combined with a solid back-line and elements of the Italian zona mista ("mixed zone" in Italian) approach, or gioco all'italiana, which was a cross between zonal marking and man-marking systems, such as catenaccio. Despite their more aggressive attacking approach under Vicini during the latter tournament, Italy initially struggled in the first round, before recovering their form in the knock-out stages, and produced small wins in five hard-fought games against defensive sides, in which they scored little but risked even less, totalling only seven goals for and none against leading up to the semi-finals of the competition. Italy would then lose a tight semi-final on penalties following a 1–1 draw with Argentina, due in no small part to a more defensive strategy from Carlos Bilardo, who then went on to lose the final 1–0 to a much more offensive-minded Germany side led by manager Franz Beckenbauer. Italy then claimed the bronze medal match with a 2–1 victory over England.

Vicini's successor as the Italy national side's manager, Arrigo Sacchi, also attempted to introduce his more attacking–minded tactical philosophy, which had been highly successful with Milan, to the Italy national team; his tactics, which were inspired by Dutch total football, made use of an aggressive high-pressing system, which used a 4–4–2 formation, an attractive, fast, attacking, and possession-based playing style, and which also used innovative elements such as zonal marking and a high defensive line playing the offside trap, which largely deviated from previous systems in Italian football, despite still maintaining defensive solidity. Italy initially struggled to replicate the system successfully, and encountered mixed results. Under Sacchi, Italy reached the final of the 1994 FIFA World Cup after a slow start, only to lose on penalties following a 0–0 draw with a defensive–minded Brazilian side, but later also suffered a first-round exit at Euro 1996.

Previously, at the 1978 FIFA World Cup, Enzo Bearzot's Italian side also often adopted an attractive, offensive-minded possession game based on passing, creativity, movement, attacking flair, and technique, due to the individual skill of his players; the front three would also often change positions with one another, in order to disorient the opposing defenders. Italy finished the tournament in fourth place, a result they replicated two years later at UEFA Euro 1980 on home soil. At the 1982 FIFA World Cup, he instead adopted a more flexible and balanced tactical approach, which was based on the zona mista system, and which used a fluid 4–3–3 formation, with Gaetano Scirea as a sweeper, who held both defensive and creative duties. While the team were organised and highly effective defensively, they were also capable of getting forward and scoring from quick counter-attacks, or keeping possession when necessary. The system proved to be highly effective as Italy went on to win the title. Bearzot's Italy side were also known for their solidity, aggression, and defensive strength, possessing a number of hard–tackling players in their team, such as midfielder Marco Tardelli, and defenders Claudio Gentile and Giuseppe Bergomi. Gentile, who served as the team's stopper, or man-marking centre-back, gained a degree of infamy in the media for his highly physical man-marking of Diego Maradona in Italy's second-round match against Argentina; although controversial, the strategy proved to be effective as Gentile essentially nullified the Argentine playmaker's impact on the game, with Italy winning the match 2–1.

Similarly, although Italy successfully used a more offensive-minded approach under manager Marcello Lippi during the 2006 FIFA World Cup, which saw a record ten of the team's 23 players find the back of the net, with the side scoring 12 goals in total as they went on to claim the title, the team's organised back-line only conceded two goals, neither of which came in open play. Notwithstanding their more attacking minded playing style throughout the tournament, when Italy was reduced to ten men in the 50th minute of the 2nd round match against Australia, following Marco Materazzi's red card, coach Lippi changed the Italians' formation to a defensive orientation which caused the British newspaper The Guardian to note that "the timidity of Italy's approach had made it seem that Helenio Herrera, the high priest of Catenaccio, had taken possession of the soul of Marcello Lippi." The ten-man team was playing with a 4–3–2 scheme, just a midfielder away from the team's regular 4–4–2 system. In a tightly contested match, Italy went on to keep a clean sheet and earned a 1–0 victory through a controversial injury-time penalty.

During his tenure with the Italy national team, Conte returned to Italy's traditional tactical roots, adopting a more organised, defensive-minded, counter-attacking approach, due to the perceived lack of talent in the side at the time, as well as injuries to key players. He used a fluid 3–5–2 formation at UEFA Euro 2016, in which the wide midfielders or wingbacks effectively functioned as wingers in a 3–3–4 formation when attacking, and as fullbacks in a 5–3–2 formation when defending behind the ball. Conte's tactics proved to be effective as Italy reached the quarter-finals, only losing out to Germany on penalties. Despite the team's defensive solidity, he refuted claims in the media that the team's style of play was based on catenaccio, in particular following Italy's offensive displays in their 2–0 victory over defending champions Spain in the round of 16.

During Italy's victorious UEFA Euro 2020 campaign, Roberto Mancini – who once had a reputation for being a more defensive-minded and pragmatic manager – instead built on the work of Maurizio Viscidi at youth level, as well as Maurizio Sarri, Roberto De Zerbi and Gian Piero Gasperini in Serie A, using a 4–3–3 formation and an attractive, attacking style based on fluid passing in possession – built around the gameplay of the midfield trio of Marco Verratti, Jorginho and Nicolò Barella – and energetic pressing and counterpressing out of possession. En route to winning the title, Mancini's side broke the record for most goals scored by an Italian side during a major international tournament.

=== Other examples ===
Catenaccio in its purer form has had its share of success stories in recent years. German coach Otto Rehhagel used a similarly defensive approach for his Greece side in UEFA Euro 2004, with the team defending deeply behind the ball, and putting pressure on their opponents, while Traianos Dellas operated as a sweeper behind the back-line. Under Rehhagel, Greece surprisingly went on to win the tournament, despite Greece being considered as underdogs prior to the competition. Despite strong emphasis on defence, only one Greek game went into extra time, which the Greeks won with a Golden goal by Traianos Dellas. Trapattoni himself also successfully employed aspects of the system in securing a Portuguese Liga title with Benfica in 2005 – the club's first in 11 years – and had also successfully used elements of the strategy in his gioco all'italiana or zona mista tactical system with several Italian clubs throughout his career, which blended aspects of zonal marking from Dutch total football with aspects of man-marking found in Italian catenaccio.

In contrast to previous editions of the tournament, during the 2018 FIFA World Cup, several teams found success against opponents who dominated possession by adopting a more defensive style and instead maintaining a deep, disciplined, and narrow defensive line, while also looking to score on counter-attacks. In addition to recent success with intricate passing and quick counter attacks, Croatia has found success with what is termed in the media as "the bunker" (bunkerica in Croatian) style tactical approach. This approach is characterized by nearly every player behind the ball, killing the game through tactical fouling, time-wasting and playing for the result the team needs as opposed to a victory. This approach is only typically employed against very successful teams and often in away matches.

Several teams have found limited success in the 2020s employing the “park the bus” strategy against more skilled opponents, however, this strategy has generally fallen out of favour.

== Legacy ==
Although pure catenaccio is no longer as commonplace in Italian football, the stereotypical association of ruthless defensive tactics with the Serie A and the Italy national team continues to be perpetuated by foreign media, particularly with the predominantly Italian defences of AC Milan of the 1990s and Juventus from the 2010s onwards being in the spotlight. Rob Bagchi wrote in British newspaper The Guardian: "Italy has also produced defenders with a surplus of ability, composure and intelligence. For every Gentile there was an Alessandro Nesta." Critics and foreign footballers who have played in the Serie A have described Italian defenders as being "masters of the dark arts", motivated by a Machiavellian philosophy of winning a game at all costs by cunning and calculating methods. Historian John Foot summed up the mentality as "the tactics are a combination of subtlety and brutality. ... The 'tactical foul' is a way of life for Italian defenders."

== See also ==
- Zona mista
- Formation (association football)
- Football tactics and skills
- Total Football
- Anti-football
- Marking (association football)

== Notes ==
- Giulianotti, Richard, Football: A Sociology of the Global Game. London: Polity Press 2000. ISBN 0-7456-1769-7
