= Possession (sports) =

Control of a ball or implement of play by a sports team

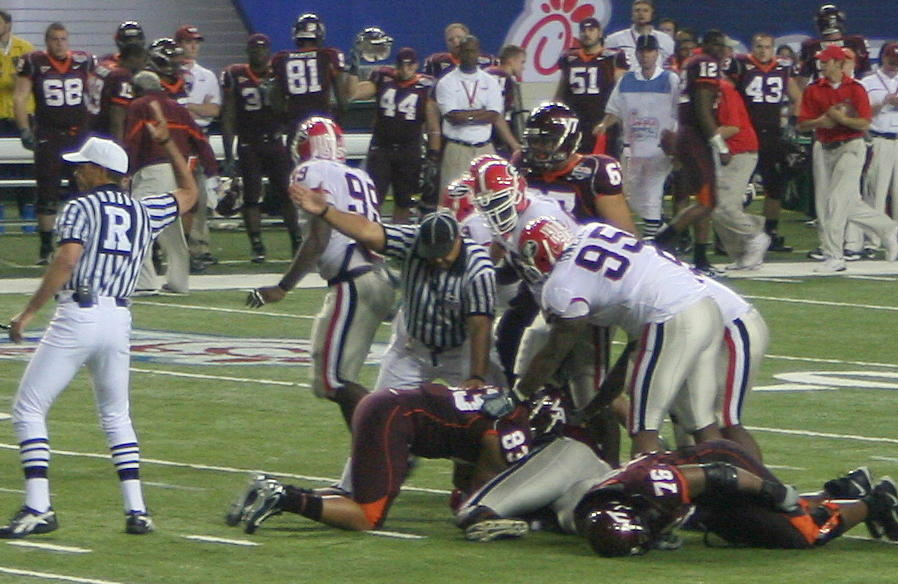
American football official indicating which team has possession after a fumble

In sports, possession is physical control of the ball or other implement of play by one team, which typically gives that team the opportunity to score. Sports have different rules governing how possession is kept or lost ("turned over"), which affect the strategy of gameplay. The number of possessions or total time of possession are often useful statistics of team or individual performance.

In goal-based sports, including basketball, all forms of football, hockey, and lacrosse, the team with possession has the opportunity to score, and is said to be on offense, while the other team is on defense. In bat-and-ball games including baseball and cricket, the ball is controlled by the fielding team, which is on defense.

== Start of gameplay ==
Possession at the start of a game (and, in some sports, in a neutral restart) may be determined by several methods, including a coin flip (American football and cricket), home team status (baseball), or by giving the teams an equal opportunity to physically take possession, in what is variously called a dropped-ball (association football), a ball-up (Australian rules football), a jump ball (basketball), or a face-off (hockey).

== Change of possession ==
=== Scoring or losing physical control ===
In several sports, possession is exchanged after the offensive team scores, or when the defensive team physically takes control of a "live" (in play) ball through a fumble, interception, steal, or penalty such as a free kick to the defensive side.

=== Allotted number of plays ===
In gridiron football, possession is additionally controlled through a series of allotted plays called downs, during which the offensive team must move the ball a certain distance down the field, or lose possession. Similarly, in rugby league, offensive teams have six chances to score, or tackles, before losing possession. In limited overs cricket, the offense has a limited number of legal deliveries, which are periods of play, in each of which a defensive player throws the ball (according to certain rules) for an offensive player to hit and attempt to help his team score off of, before the offense's scoring turn ends and the defense must surrender possession of the ball.

=== Shot clocks ===
In some timed sports, including basketball and lacrosse, a team with possession and a lead in score may try to "run time off the clock" by keeping the ball but not attempting to score, in order to deny the opposing team possession. A shot clock speeds gameplay by requiring teams to attempt to score within a certain period of time or lose possession.

=== Bat-and-ball sports ===
In bat-and-ball sports, the teams switch offensive and defensive roles after the end of one of the batting (offensive) team's scoring turns (called an "inning" or "innings"), which is brought about by the defense getting a certain number of offensive players "out" by various rules in each game.

=== Turnovers by sport ===
Turnovers in different sports include:

- Turnover (basketball), resulting from a steal, or a player going out of bounds, committing a violation (including exceeding the shot clock), or committing an offensive foul
- Turnover (gridiron football), in American and Canadian football, when the offense loses possession of the football because of a fumble, interception, or on downs
- Turnover (rugby league), when a team loses possession or at the end of a team's six tackles
- Turnover (rugby union), when a team loses possession in a ruck or a maul

== Calculation and statistical use ==
In association football, several methods have been used to measure teams' possession percentage, including both clock time and proportion of passes by a team. It has historically been assumed that a greater possession percentage correlates with a scoring advantage, however, at least one study has questioned this assumption.
