= Marking (association football) =

Defensive tactic in association football

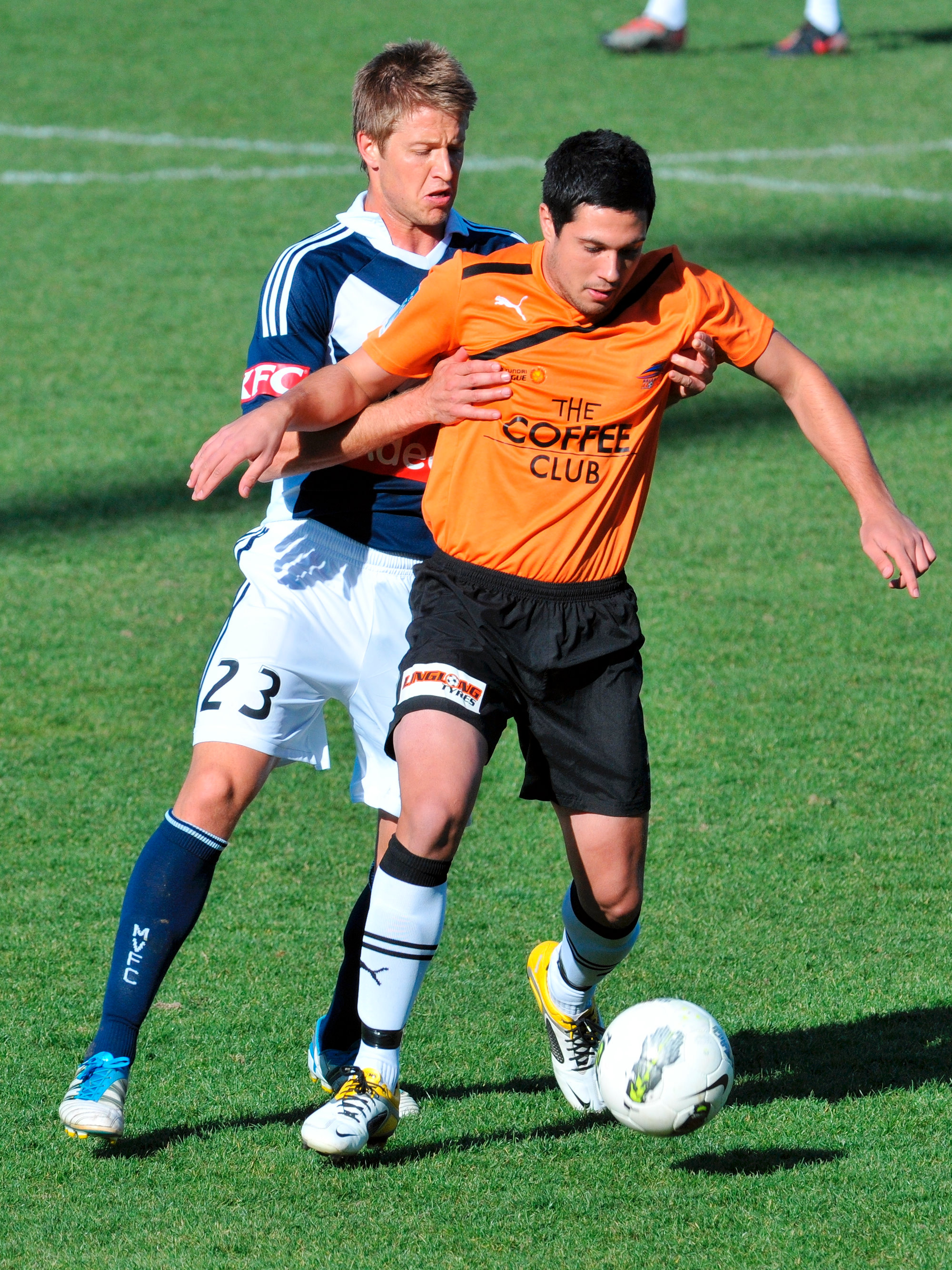
Adrian Leijer marking Rocky Visconte

In association football, marking is an organized defensive tactic which aims to prevent a member of the opposing team (usually a striker) from taking control of the ball. Several marking strategies exist in football, and they mostly differ from each other according to the duties assigned to defenders, positioning and off-the-ball style.

== Man-to-man marking ==
Man-to-man marking, or man marking, is a defensive strategy where defenders are assigned a specific opposition player to mark, as opposed to zonal marking, where a certain player marks an area of the pitch. Teams such as Inter Milan and A.C. Milan used it in their so-called catenaccio system. Their formation consisted of a defensive line made up of four man markers with a sweeper playing behind them. This brought much success to these teams and soon these tactics became popular throughout the world of football. However, this tight marking was often at the expense of the (attacking) spectacle of the game itself, because "defenders preoccupied with their defensive markings may be reluctant contributors to the team's offense".

Famous examples of man marking performances are Berti Vogts against Johann Cruyff in 1974, Claudio Gentile against Diego Maradona and Zico in 1982, or Guido Buchwald against Maradona in 1990.

The strategy is one that has been supposedly dying out in football over the past decade or so despite Greece's success with it in the 2004 European Championships. It is however often used by lower-tier teams, as well as teams defending themselves from much stronger opponents. Examples include Dynamo Kyiv's Aleksandr Khatskevich man-marking Real Madrid's Predrag Mijatović in the 1999 Champions League quarter-finals, PSV Eindhoven's Park Ji-sung man-marking Milan's Andrea Pirlo in the 2005 Champions League semi-finals, Chelsea's Michael Essien man-marking Liverpool's Steven Gerrard in the 2009 Champions League quarter-finals, Chelsea's José Bosingwa man-marking Barcelona's Lionel Messi in the same season's Champions League semi-finals and Manchester United's Danny Welbeck man-marking Real Madrid's Xabi Alonso in the 2013 Champions League round of 16. Managers such as Guus Hiddink and Marcelo Bielsa have occasionally continued to use man-marking in the 21st century, Bielsa employing it as late as 2020.

== Zonal marking ==
Zonal marking is a defensive strategy where defenders cover an area of the pitch rather than marking a specific opponent. If an opponent moves into the area a defender is covering, the defender marks the opponent. If the opponent leaves this area, then marking the opponent becomes the responsibility of another defender.

The biggest advantage of zonal marking is its flexibility. When the team regains possession of the ball, players are still in their positions and can start an attack more quickly. Communication is very important when zonal marking is used, to ensure that no gaps are left is difficult when defending set pieces such as free kicks and corners, and most teams change to man marking in these situations.

The formation used by a team may dictate whether or not to use zonal marking. Teams playing 4–4–2 usually operate a zonal marking system, but teams playing a sweeper do not. Amongst professional teams zonal marking is the most common system: 15 of the 16 teams that reached the knockout stages of the 2004 UEFA Champions League used zonal marking.

Training methods to develop this technique include coloured cones and a 5-metre rope. The coloured cone method is set up by having certain colours set out in sections of the pitch; each player will be put in the coloured section and will not be allowed to leave it. The 5-metre rope is a piece of equipment where the four defenders are attached by a rope which means they are used to staying and working together.

== Marking today ==
Today, several modern defensive formations use a mixture of both man-to-man and zonal marking e.g. 3–5–2 formation (which defensively becomes a 5–3–2). This means 5 defenders: 2 stoppers marking man-to-man, 1 sweeper (sweepers always mark by zone), and 2 wingbacks playing almost like end-to-end side midfielders. Also, several other teams rely exclusively on pure zonal marking approaches.

== See also ==
- Man-to-man defense
- Prevent defense
- Zone defense

== Bibliography ==
Catlin, Mark G. (1990). "Organizing the Defense". The Art of Soccer. St. Paul, Minnesota: Soccer Books. ISBN 0-9626834-2-6.
