= 1983–84 Juventus FC season =

Italian football club season

Juventus
1983–84 season
- Owner: Agnelli family
- President: Giampiero Boniperti
- Head Coach: Giovanni Trapattoni
- Stadium: Comunale
- Serie A: Winners (in 1984-85 European Cup)
- Coppa Italia: Round of 16
- European Cup Winners' Cup: Winners
- Top goalscorer: League: Michel Platini (20); All: Michel Platini (25)
Home colours	Away colours	Third colours

Juventus Football Club finished the season as Serie A champions. They also won the European Cup Winners' Cup and participated in the Coppa Italia.

== Squad ==
Note: Flags indicate national team as defined under FIFA eligibility rules; some limited exceptions apply. Players may hold more than one non-FIFA nationality.

Pos.	Nation	Player
GK	ITA	Luciano Bodini
GK	ITA	Stefano Tacconi
DF	ITA	Sergio Brio
DF	ITA	Antonio Cabrini
DF	ITA	Nicola Caricola (II)
DF	ITA	Claudio Gentile
DF	ITA	Gaetano Scirea (C)
MF	SMR	Massimo Bonini
MF	ITA	Giuseppe Furino

Pos.	Nation	Player
MF	ITA	Giovanni Koetting
MF	ITA	Cesare Prandelli
MF	ITA	Marco Tardelli
MF	ITA	Roberto Tavola
MF	ITA	Beniamino Vignola
FW	POL	Zbigniew Boniek
FW	ITA	Domenico Penzo
FW	FRA	Michel Platini
FW	ITA	Paolo Rossi

=== Transfers ===
In
Pos.	Name	from	Type
GK	Stefano Tacconi	Avellino	
MF	Michael Laudrup	Brondby IF	
MF	Nicola Caricola	AS Bari	
MF	Beniamino Vignola	Avellino	
FW	Domenico Penzo	Hellas Verona	

Out
Pos.	Name	To	Type
GK	Dino Zoff		retired
FW	Giuseppe Galderisi	Hellas Verona	
FW	Michael Laudrup	SS Lazio	loan
FW	Roberto Bettega	Toronto Blizzard	free
DF	Massimo Storgato	Hellas Verona	
MF	Domenico Marocchino	Sampdoria	

== Competitions ==
=== Serie A ===
==== League table ====
Pos	Team	Pld	W	D	L	GF	GA	GD	Pts	Qualification or relegation
1	Juventus (C)	30	17	9	4	57	29	+28	43	Qualification to European Cup
2	Roma	30	15	11	4	48	28	+20	41	Qualification to Cup Winners' Cup
3	Fiorentina	30	12	12	6	48	31	+17	36	Qualification to UEFA Cup
4	Internazionale	30	12	11	7	37	23	+14	35	Qualification to UEFA Cup
5	Torino	30	11	11	8	37	30	+7	33	

Source: RSSSF.com
Rules for classification: 1) Points; 2) Head-to-head points; 3) Head-to-head goal difference; 4) Goal difference; 5) Goals scored; 6) Draw. (Note: Head-to-head record is used only after all the matches between the teams in question have been played).
(C) Champions

==== Position by result ====
Round	1	2	3	4	5	6	7	8	9	10	11	12	13	14	15	16	17	18	19	20	21	22	23	24	25	26	27	28	29	30
Ground	H	A	H	A	H	H	H	H	A	A	H	A	H	A	H	A	H	A	H	A	H	A	A	H	H	A	H	A	H	A
Result	W	D	W	W	W	L	L	W	W	D	D	D	W	W	W	D	W	D	W	W	W	D	L	W	W	D	W	W	D	L
Position	1	3	2	1	1	4	4	2	1	1	1	2	1	1	1	1	1	1	1	1	1	1	1	1	1	1	1	1	1	1

Source: http://calcio-seriea.net/allenatori_squadra/1983/894/
A = Away; H = Home; W = Win; D = Draw; L = Loss; P = Postponed; = Leader, 1984–85 European Cup; = 1984–85 UEFA Cup

==== Matches ====
11 September 1983 1	Juventus	7–0	Ascoli	Turin
	Rossi 11', 25'; Penzo 34', 90'; Platini 44' (pen.), 51'; Boniek 82'			Stadium: Stadio Comunale; Referee: Paparesta

18 September 1983 2	Pisa	0–0	Juventus	Pisa
				Stadium: Stadio Arena Garibaldi; Referee: Longhi

25 September 1983 3	Juventus	2–0	Napoli	Turin
	Cabrini 55'; Rossi 88'			Stadium: Stadio Comunale; Referee: Pieri

2 October 1983 4	Lazio	0–1	Juventus	Rome
			42' Platini	Stadium: Stadio Olimpico; Referee: Bergamo

9 October 1983 5	Juventus	2–1	Milan	Turin
	Platini 5'; Rossi 18'		79' (pen.) Baresi	Stadium: Stadio Comunale; Referee: Lo Bello

23 October 1983 6	Torino	2–1	Juventus	Turin
	Dossena 60'; Selvaggi 76'		67' Cabrini	Stadium: Stadio Comunale; Referee: D'Elia

30 October 1983 7	Juventus	1–2	Sampdoria	Turin
	Rossi 37'		50' (pen.) Brady; 75' Galia	Stadium: Stadio Comunale; Referee: Lanese

6 November 1983 8	Juventus	3–1	Hellas Verona	Turin
	Boniek 8'; Rossi 32', 83'		38' (pen.) Iorio	Stadium: Stadio Comunale; Referee: Redini

20 November 1983 9	Catania	0–2	Juventus	Catania
			77' Rossi; 89' Platini	Stadium: Stadio Cibali; Referee: Barbaresco

27 November 1983 10	Fiorentina	3–3	Juventus	Florence
	Antognoni 12'; Bertoni 47', 56'		2' Bonini; 27' Platini; 76' (o.g.) Contratto	Stadium: Stadio Comunale; Referee: Lo Bello

4 December 1983 11	Juventus	2–2	Roma	Turin
	Platini 72'; Penzo 77'		62' Conti; 90' Pruzzo	Stadium: Stadio Comunale; Referee: Casarin

11 December 1983 12	Udinese	2–2	Juventus	Udine
	Galparoli 9'; Virdis 29'		7' Rossi; 73' Platini	Stadium: Friuli; Referee: Bergamo

18 December 1983 13	Juventus	2–0	Internazionale	Turin
	Platini 44'; Vignola 83'			Stadium: Stadio Comunale; Referee: Pieri

31 December 1983 14	Avellino	1–2	Juventus	Avellino
	Colomba 15'		14' Platini; 86' Penzo	Stadium: Stadio Partenio; Referee: Barbaresco

8 January 1984 15	Juventus	4–2	Genoa	Turin
	Platini 23'; Cabrini 33'; Penzo 62'; Rossi 75' (pen.)		29' Briaschi I 59' Benedetti	Stadium: Stadio Comunale; Referee: Agnolin

15 January 1984 16	Ascoli	0–0	Juventus	Ascoli
				Stadium: Stadio Cino e Lillo Del Duca; Referee: Casarin

22 January 1984 17	Juventus	3–1	Pisa Calcio	Turin
	Vianello 12' (o.g.); Boniek 24'; Platini 26'		80' Criscimanni	Stadium: Stadio Comunale; Referee: Ballerini

29 January 1984 18	S.S.C. Napoli	1–1	Juventus	Naples
	De Rosa 74'		28' Platini	Stadium: San Paolo; Referee: Bergamo

12 February 1984 19	Juventus	2–1	Lazio	Turin
	Piscedda 12' (o.g.); Platini 63' (pen.)		71' Laudrup I	Stadium: Stadio Comunale; Referee: Pieri

19 February 1984 20	A.C. Milan	0–3	Juventus	Milan
			13' Platini; 65' Rossi; 84' Vignola	Stadium: San Siro; Referee: Lo Bello

26 February 1984 21	Juventus	2–1	Torino	Turin
	Platini 66', 76'		55' Selvaggi	Stadium: Stadio Comunale; Referee: Bergamo

11 March 1984 22	U.C. Sampdoria	1–1	Juventus	Genoa
	Brady 58' (pen.)		83' (pen.) Platini	Stadium: Luigi Ferraris; Referee: Casarin

18 March 1984 23	Hellas Verona	2–1	Juventus	Verona
	Iorio 52' (pen.); Galderisi 66'		1' Platini	Stadium: Stadio Marcantonio Bentegodi; Referee: D'Elia

25 March 1984 24	Juventus	2–0	Calcio Catania	Turin
	Scirea 33', 38'			Stadium: Stadio Comunale; Referee: Ballerini

1 April 1984 25	Juventus	1–0	Fiorentina	Turin
	Vignola 90' (pen.)			Stadium: Stadio Comunale; Referee: Lo Bello

15 April 1984 26	Roma	0–0	Juventus	Rome
				Stadium: Stadio Olimpico; Referee: Casarin

21 April 1984 27	Juventus	3–2	Udinese	Turin
	Rossi 15'; Vignola 51', 67'		41' Mauro II; 42' Zico	Stadium: Stadio Comunale; Referee: Pieri

29 April 1984 28	Internazionale	1–2	Juventus	Milan
	Altobelli 45' (pen.)		24' Cabrini; 37' Platini	Stadium: Giuseppe Meazza; Referee: Agnolin

6 May 1984 29	Juventus	1–1	Avellino	Turin
	Rossi 20'		72' (pen.) Colomba	Stadium: Stadio Comunale; Referee: Paparesta

13 May 1984 30	Genoa	2–1	Juventus	Genoa
	Vignola 10' (o.g.); Bosetti 89'		7' Cabrini	Stadium: Luigi Ferraris; Referee: Casarin

=== Coppa Italia ===
==== Group 2 ====
Pos	Team	Pld	W	D	L	GF	GA	GD	Pts
1	Juventus	5	2	2	1	7	5	+2	6
2	Bari	5	1	4	0	3	2	+1	6
3	Lazio	5	1	3	1	3	2	+1	5
4	Catanzaro	5	1	3	1	2	1	+1	5
5	Perugia	5	1	3	1	2	3	−1	5
6	Taranto	5	1	1	3	3	7	−4	3

21 August 1983 1	Perugia	1–0	Juventus	Perugia
				Stadium: Stadio Renato Curi

24 August 1983 2	S.S.C. Bari	2–2	Juventus	Bari
				Stadium: Stadio della Vittoria

28 August 1983 3	Juventus	1–0	Catanzaro	Turin
				Stadium: Communale

31 August 1983 4	Juventus	3–1	Taranto	Turin
				Stadium: Communale

4 September 1983 5	S.S. Lazio	1–1	Juventus	Rome
				Stadium: Stadio Olimpico

==== Round of 16 ====
Team 1	Agg.	Team 2	1st leg	2nd leg
Juventus	3-4	Bari	1-2	2-2

=== European Cup Winners' Cup ===
==== First round ====
14 September 1983 1	Juventus (Italy)	7–0	(Poland) Lechia Gdańsk	Turin, Italy
	Platini 18', 26'; Penzo 24', 28', 60', 67'; Rossi 75'			Stadium: Stadio Olimpico di Torino; Attendance: 32,000; Referee: Raúl Fernandes Nazaré (Portugal)

28 September 1983 2	Lechia Gdańsk (Poland)	2–3 (2–10 agg.)	(Italy) Juventus	Gdańsk, Poland
	Kowalczyk 50'; Kruszczyński 65' (pen.)		Vignola 17'; Tavola 77'; Boniek 83'	Stadium: Stadion MOSiR; Attendance: 35,000; Referee: Keith Hackett (England)

==== Second round ====
19 October 1983 1	Paris Saint-Germain (France)	2–2	(Italy) Juventus	Paris, France
	Couriol 39'; N'Gom 90'		Boniek 62'; Cabrini 76'	Stadium: Parc des Princes; Attendance: 48,776; Referee: Vojtech Christov (Czechoslovakia)

2 November 1983 2	Juventus (Italy)	0–0 (2a–2 agg.)	(France) Paris Saint-Germain	Turin, Italy
				Stadium: Stadio Olimpico di Torino; Attendance: 53,610; Referee: Volker Roth (West Germany)

==== Quarter-finals ====
7 March 1984 1	Haka (Finland)	0–1	(Italy) Juventus	Strasbourg, France
			Vignola 90'	Stadium: Stade de la Meinau; Attendance: 19,000; Referee: Ib Nielsen (Denmark)

21 March 1984 2	Juventus (Italy)	1–0 (2–0 agg.)	(Finland) Haka	Turin, Italy
	Tardelli 15'			Stadium: Stadio Olimpico di Torino; Attendance: 22,135; Referee: Ioan Igna (Romania)

==== Semi-finals ====
11 April 1984 1	Manchester United (England)	1–1	(Italy) Juventus	Manchester, England
	Davies 35'		Rossi 14'	Stadium: Old Trafford; Attendance: 58,231; Referee: Jan Keizer (Netherlands)

25 April 1984 2	Juventus (Italy)	2–1 (3–2 agg.)	(England) Manchester United	Turin, Italy
	Boniek 13'; Rossi 90'		Whiteside 70'	Stadium: Stadio Olimpico di Torino; Attendance: 54,555; Referee: Alexis Ponnet (Belgium)

==== Final ====
16 May 1984	Juventus (Italy)	2–1	(Portugal) Porto	Basel, Switzerland
20:15 CEST	Vignola 12'; Boniek 41'		António Sousa 29'	Stadium: St. Jakob Stadium; Attendance: 60,000; Referee: Adolf Prokop (East Germany)

== Statistics ==
=== Players statistics ===
No.	Pos	Nat	Player	Total		Serie A		Coppa Italia		Cup Winners' Cup	
No.	Pos	Nat	Player	Apps	Goals	Apps	Goals	Apps	Goals	Apps	Goals
	GK	(Italy) ITA	Stefano Tacconi	39	-38	23	-22	7	-9	9	-7
	DF	(Italy) ITA	Claudio Gentile	37	0	24	0	5	0	8	0
	DF	(Italy) ITA	Gaetano Scirea	46	3	30	2	7	1	9	0
	DF	(Italy) ITA	Sergio Brio	42	0	26	0	7	0	9	0
	DF	(Italy) ITA	Antonio Cabrini	44	8	29	5	6	2	9	1
	MF	(Italy) ITA	Marco Tardelli	42	2	28	0	6	1	8	1
	MF	(San Marino) SMR	Massimo Bonini	45	1	29	1	7	0	9	0
	MF	(France) FRA	Michel Platini	43	25	28	20	7	3	8	2
	FW	(Poland) POL	Zbigniew Boniek	42	9	27	3	6	2	9	4
	FW	(Italy) ITA	Paolo Rossi	46	15	30	13	7	0	9	2
	FW	(Italy) ITA	Domenico Penzo	36	10	25	5	5	1	6	4
	GK	(Italy) ITA	Luciano Bodini	7	-7	7	-7				
	MF	(Italy) ITA	Beniamino Vignola	36	8	8+17	5	4	0	7	3
	DF	(Italy) ITA	Nicola Caricola	28	0	14+6	0	3	0	5	0
	MF	(Italy) ITA	Cesare Prandelli	26	0	8+9	0	5	0	4	0
	MF	(Italy) ITA	Roberto Tavola	6	1	2	0	2	0	2	1
	DF	(Italy) ITA	Giuseppe Furino	3	0	1	0	2	0		
	MF	(Italy) ITA	Giovanni Koetting	2	0	1	0	1	0		
