= UEFA Women's Euro 2029 bids =

The bidding process for the UEFA Women's Euro 2029 started on 23 July 2024 and ended on 3 December 2025 with the announcement of the host. Germany were announced as hosts on 3 December 2025 at a meeting in Lausanne.

== Hosting requirements ==
The tournament is expected to continue the format of the 2017, 2022 and 2025 editions, with a total of 31 matches taking place for a duration of up to 25 days, with 16 teams competing in the tournament.

The requirements for the stadiums are as follows:

- Minimum of 1 stadium with a gross seating capacity of at least 50,000 seats (potential final hosting)
- Minimum of 3 stadiums with a gross seating capacity of at least 30,000 seats
- Minimum of 4 stadiums with a gross seating capacity of 20,000 seats
- 4 quality training facilities per stadium
- 4 hotels per stadium
- All proposed stadiums must have natural grass playing surfaces

UEFA confirmed the bidding process on 23 July 2024.

Date	Notes
24 September 2024	Deadline for UEFA member associations to confirm their interest in bidding
1 October 2024	Bid requirements published to all interested bidders
12 March 2025	Submission of the Preliminary Bid Dossier
28 August 2025	Submission of the final Bid Dossier
3 December 2025	Appointment of host(s) of UEFA Women's Euro 2029

== Confirmed bids ==
Four submitted bids have been made by the deadline of 28 August 2025 to host the tournament:

- Denmark and Sweden
- Germany
- Poland

=== Denmark and Sweden ===
Proposed venues in Denmark and Sweden for UEFA Women’s Euro 2029

After the two nations failed to secure the hosting rights for 2025 alongside Finland and Norway, the president of the Swedish Football Association, Fredrik Reinfeldt, stated that they would consider potentially bidding in the future. On 8 February 2024, ahead of the UEFA Congress in Paris, Denmark and Sweden formally expressed their interest in hosting the 2029 tournament.

Although the four Nordic countries initially planned to bid jointly once again, the evaluation report from the 2025 bidding process advised that the likelihood of success would increase with only two hosts. As a result, Denmark and Sweden chose to pair up. Norway was reportedly disappointed by this decision and indicated a desire to negotiate with the two nations about joining the bid. However, on 24 April 2024, Denmark and Sweden officially decided against involving Norway in their bid.

Subsequently, following the release of UEFA's hosting requirements, concerns arose regarding Denmark's stadium infrastructure, particularly the lack of venues meeting the minimum capacity standards. Danish Football Association director Erik Brøgger Rasmussen acknowledged that said stadiums could be expanded to meet these requirements. In addition, the Danish Football Association has held negotiations with Aarhus Municipality and Copenhagen Municipality regarding the construction of a new stadium with a capacity of 20,000 seats. The Danish federation president has stated that the lack of a fourth venue meeting capacity requirements is not a problem. UEFA's new vice president, Jesper Møller also expressed concerns about Denmark's stadiums. Eventually, construction on a new stadium replacing Aarhus Stadium began.

Denmark had proposed Copenhagen, Brøndby, Aarhus, Herning and Odense as possible venues. Venues in Gothenburg, Malmö, and two stadiums in Stockholm were the proposed venues in Sweden. Viborg was also considered by Denmark, but this never materialised.

Regarding Gothenburg, hosting would cost the city 40 million KR Stockholm has also announced a budget of 80 million KR.

Denmark and Sweden have both lobbied in Switzerland during the 2025 edition to try and garner votes. The lack of government funding from Sweden, alongside the lack of stadiums meeting requirements, has been considered an issue for the Swedes.

In July 2025, residents in Stockholm convincingly supported the candidacy, with a profit of 927 million KR projected if Stockholm receives the hosting rights.

On 12 August 2025, the Copenhagen city council unanimously approved their financial backing of 30 million DKK for the bid.

On 28 August 2025, both countries submitted their official joint application for the tournament. The previously aforementioned venues were included bar Herning in Denmark have been selected for the bid. Denmark and Sweden aspire to fill out their stadiums and have a total attendance of almost one million. The Danish government has set aside 10 million for the tournament.

On 5 November 2025, the Swedish government announced they would fund the tournament if the bid wins.

Copenhagen, Aarhus and Odense are receiving legal advise for the bid by Horten.

Danish actress, Birgitte Hjort Sørensen, alongside chairman of the Swedish Football Association, Simon Åström, performed the presentation.

The opening match would be in Copenhagen while the final would be in Stockholm.

Denmark previously hosted the UEFA Women's Euro 1991, while Sweden has an extensive history of hosting major international football tournaments, including the men's 1958 FIFA World Cup, UEFA Euro 1992, the 1995 FIFA Women's World Cup, UEFA Women's Euro 1997 (co-hosted with Norway), and UEFA Women's Euro 2013 as sole host.

(Sweden) Stockholm (Solna)	(Sweden) Gothenburg	(Sweden) Stockholm	(Sweden) Malmö
Strawberry Arena	Ullevi	3Arena	Stadion
Capacity: 50,653	Capacity: 43,000	Capacity: 30,000	Capacity: 21,000
(Denmark) Copenhagen	(Denmark) Aarhus	(Denmark) Brøndby	(Denmark) Odense
Parken Stadium	Skovens Arena	Brøndby Stadium	Odense Stadium
Capacity: 38,190	Capacity: 24,000 (new)	Capacity: 23,400	Capacity: 13,573

=== Germany ===
Proposed venues in Germany for UEFA Women's Euro 2029

The German Football Association announced on 20 September 2024 that they would make a bid for Euro 2029 and submit their interest to UEFA by the deadline of 24 September. DFB president Bernd Neuendorf said in a statement the bid was the organisation's "flagship project" which will give an "additional boost" to women's football in Germany.

On 28 November 2024, it was announced that the following 17 cities have submitted applications to host matches: Berlin, Bremen, Cologne, Dortmund, Düsseldorf, Essen, Frankfurt am Main, Freiburg, Gelsenkirchen, Hamburg, Hanover, Leipzig, Mainz, Munich, Rostock, Stuttgart and Wolfsburg, with Augsburg and Nürnberg having already rejected the proposition of hosting games.

In January 2025, 15 cities had submitted documents in time.

On 19 February 2025, the DFB announced the shortlist of host cities: Berlin, Cologne, Dortmund, Düsseldorf, Frankfurt, Gelsenkirchen, Hanover, Leipzig, Munich, Rostock and Wolfsburg.

The bid logo and slogan for the tournament; Together WE Rise, was unveiled on International Women's Day. The DFB stated that they want to use this tournament for the social progression, and aim to have a record one million spectators attend the tournament.

On 13 June 2025, the DFB confirmed the host cities for their bid dossier. Berlin, Gelsenkirchen and Rostock were not chosen. In regards to Berlin, spokeswoman for the Senate Department for the Interior and Sport Sabine Beikler stated that "Berlin is not prepared to take financial and contractual risks as part of the application."

Members of the DFB expert committee have viewed the applications from Poland and Scandinavia as their main rivals.

Dortmund will host the opening match while Munich will host the final.

Germany previously hosted the men's 1974 FIFA World Cup, the men's UEFA Euro 1988, UEFA Women's Euro 1989, UEFA Women's Euro 2001, the men's 2006 FIFA World Cup, 2011 FIFA Women's World Cup and the men's UEFA Euro 2024.

Munich	Dortmund	Frankfurt	Düsseldorf
Allianz Arena	Westfalenstadion	Waldstadion	Merkur Spiel-Arena
Capacity: 70,000	Capacity: 66,099	Capacity: 53,800	Capacity: 51,031
Hanover	Cologne	Leipzig	Wolfsburg
Niedersachsenstadion	RheinEnergieStadion	Red Bull Arena	Volkswagen Arena
Capacity: 49,000	Capacity: 45,965	Capacity: 45,228	Capacity: 26,000

=== Poland ===
Proposed venues in Poland for UEFA Women's Euro 2029

After failing to receive the 2025 hosting rights to Switzerland, on 26 July 2024 president of the Polish Football Association, Cezary Kulesza, announced that Poland will bid once again to host the tournament in 2029.

Białystok, Gdańsk and Wrocław (who stated they wanted to host the final) have stated their intent to be part of the bid. In June 2025, the Polish government approved the bid. In July 2025, Poland's proposed venues were announced with seven cities hosting matches. The final would be at the Stadion Narodowy in Warsaw. Łódź, Bielsko-Biała and Poznań were considered as options, but didn't materialise.

The Poles have been lobbying in Switzerland during the 2025 edition.

On 21 October 2025, reports emerged that Legia Warsaw's owner, Dariusz Mioduski, has not signed the agreement that would allow the Polish Army Stadium to be used.

Poland previously hosted the men's UEFA Euro 2012 (co-hosted with Ukraine), the 2019 FIFA U-20 World Cup, and the 2026 FIFA U-20 Women's World Cup as sole host.

Warsaw	Wrocław	Gdańsk	Kraków
Stadion Narodowy	Wrocław Stadium	Gdańsk Stadium	Henryk Reyman Municipal Stadium
Capacity: 56,826	Capacity: 42,771	Capacity: 41,620	Capacity: 33,326
Zabrze	Warsaw	Białystok	Szczecin
Arena Zabrze	Polish Army Stadium	Stadion Miejski	Florian Krygier Municipal Stadium
Capacity: 31,871	Capacity: 31,103	Capacity: 22,432	Capacity: 21,163

== Withdrawn bids ==
=== Italy ===
On 1 October 2024, the Italian Football Federation announced that it will bid to host the tournament as a build-up to co-host the men's UEFA Euro 2032 with Turkey. However, their bid could be affected by less than satisfactory stadium conditions.

Italy previously hosted the men's 1934 FIFA World Cup, the men's UEFA Euro 1968, the men's UEFA Euro 1980, the men's 1990 FIFA World Cup, UEFA Women's Euro 1993, and part of the men's UEFA Euro 2020.

On 29 August 2025, Italy withdrew from bidding, with concerns about the stadium quality possibly being a factor in the decision. UEFA president Aleksander Čeferin stated in July 2025 that the country had until 2027 to build new stadiums for UEFA Euro 2032 or risk losing its co-host status.

=== Portugal ===
Proposed venues in Portugal for UEFA Women's Euro 2029

On 4 September 2024 the Portuguese Football Federation, after a general meeting with the board, announced they would present a bid to host Euro 2029.

The Portuguese Football Federation met with the Minister of Parliamentary Affairs and talked about the bid.

On 20 November 2025, it was announced that Portugal was withdrawing its candidacy to focus on co-hosting the 2030 FIFA World Cup with Morocco and Spain.

Portugal previously hosted the men's UEFA Euro 2004.

Lisbon		Porto	Aveiro
Estádio da Luz	Estádio José Alvalade	Estádio do Dragão	Estádio Municipal de Aveiro
Capacity: 68,100	Capacity: 52,095	Capacity: 50,033	Capacity: 32,830
Faro/Loulé	Braga	Guimarães	Leiria
Estádio Algarve	Estádio Municipal de Braga	Estádio D. Afonso Henriques	Estádio Dr. Magalhães Pessoa
Capacity: 30,305	Capacity: 30,286	Capacity: 30,029	Capacity: 23,888

== Host announcement ==
Germany were announced as hosts on 3 December 2025 at a meeting in Lausanne.

Country(s)	Votes
Germany	15
Denmark, Sweden	2
Poland	0
Total	17

== Reaction ==
=== Denmark and Sweden ===
Denmark stated that they were disappointed but that they had created a deep collaboration with the Swedes that they would hope help both countries excel in football. Jesper Møller, Danish football president stated that members of the voting executive committee told him the Scandinavians' presentation was the best but the disparity with the German's stadiums was too much to overcome. He also said that he will talk with UEFA before they think about making a bid for 2033 and if it is impossible to host, they might bid for the youth competition or a club final instead. The Swedes on the other hand said it is too early to know if they will bid again.

=== Poland ===
Reactions in Poland were primarily a mix of disappointment, disillusionment, and criticism of the Polish Football Association (PZPN), especially after Poland received no votes and Germany won decisively. The defeat was hailed as evidence of the need for more intensive investment in infrastructure and the development of women's football, with the media citing the result as a "disgraceful result" and a "disaster." While some, like Zbigniew Boniek, acknowledged Germany's football powerhouse status, they were surprised by the lack of votes for Poland. The association was accused of "sham actions" and an ineffective candidacy that failed to convince UEFA Executive Committee members.
