= 1984–85 SSC Napoli season =

Napoli
1984-85 season
- Owner: Corrado Ferlaino
- President: Corrado Ferlaino
- Head coach: Rino Marchesi
- Stadium: San Paolo
- Serie A: 8th
- Coppa Italia: Last 16
- Top goalscorer: League: Diego Maradona (14); All: Maradona (17)
Home colours	Away colours

S.S.C. Napoli improved by three positions following the arrival of Diego Maradona at the club. The new #10 had been bought from FC Barcelona on a World record transfer fee, and he fulfilled expectations with 14 goals in his debut season, making him the third best scorer in the entire league. The teams' league performance, however, was only average, ending up eight of out 16 teams. The previous season had almost resulted in relegation, so Maradona's arrival certainly boosted the team well before its two scudetti.

== Squad ==
Note: Flags indicate national team as defined under FIFA eligibility rules; some limited exceptions apply. Players may hold more than one non-FIFA nationality.

Pos.	Nation	Player
GK	ITA	Luciano Castellini
GK	ITA	Raffaele Di Fusco
GK	ITA	Enrico Zazzaro
DF	ITA	Giuseppe Bruscolotti
DF	ITA	Raimondo Marino
DF	ITA	Moreno Ferrario
DF	ITA	Ciro Ferrara
DF	ITA	Antonio Carannante
DF	ITA	Simone Boldini
DF	ITA	Ugo Napolitano
DF	ITA	Marco De Simone

Pos.	Nation	Player
MF	ITA	Luigi Caffarelli
MF	ITA	Paolo Dal Fiume
MF	ITA	Costanzo Celestini
MF	ITA	Salvatore Bagni
MF	ITA	Massimiliano Fagno
MF	ITA	Walter De Vecchi
FW	ARG	Diego Maradona
FW	ITA	Domenico Penzo
FW	ARG	Daniel Bertoni
FW	ITA	Pietro Puzone

=== Transfers ===
In
Pos.	Name	from	Type
FW	Diego Maradona	FC Barcelona	U$ 10,5 million
MF	Daniel Bertoni	Fiorentina	
DF	Walter De Vecchi	Ascoli	
DF	Raimondo Marino	Catanzaro	loan ended
MF	Salvatore Bagni	Inter	
FW	Domenico Penzo	Juventus	

Out
Pos.	Name	To	Type
MF	Dirceu	Ascoli	
DF	Ruud Krol	Cannes	
GK	Massimo Assante	Cavese	
DF	Carmine Della Pietra	Campobasso	
DF	Angelo Frappampina	Taranto	
DF	Marco Masi	Pisa	
MF	Pasquale Casale	Avellino	
MF	Ciro Muro	Monopoli	loan
FW	Massimo Palanca	Foligno	
FW	Claudio Pellegrini	Fiorentina	

==== Winter ====
In
Pos.	Name	from	type
DF	Marco De Simone	Cagliari	

Out
Pos.	Name	to	type
FW	Gianni De Rosa	Cagliari	

== Competitions ==
=== Serie A ===
==== League table ====
Pos	Team	Pld	W	D	L	GF	GA	GD	Pts	Qualification or relegation
6	Juventus (Note: Juventus gained entry to the 1985–86 European Cup as defending champions.)	30	11	14	5	48	33	+15	36 (Note: Position defined by head-to-head points: Milan: 3 pts; Juventus: 1 pt.)	Qualification to European Cup
7	Roma	30	10	14	6	33	25	+8	34	
8	Napoli	30	10	13	7	34	29	+5	33	
9	Fiorentina	30	8	13	9	33	31	+2	29	
10	Atalanta	30	5	18	7	20	32	−12	28	

Source: RSSSF.com
Rules for classification: 1) Points; 2) Head-to-head points; 3) Head-to-head goal difference; 4) Goal difference; 5) Goals scored; 6) Draw. (Note: Head-to-head record is used only after all the matches between the teams in question have been played).

==== Results by round ====
Round	1	2	3	4	5	6	7	8	9	10	11	12	13	14	15	16	17	18	19	20	21	22	23	24	25	26	27	28	29	30
Ground	H	A	H	A	H	A	H	A	H	A	H	A	H	A	H	A	H	A	H	A	H	A	H	A	H	A	H	A	H	A
Result	L	D	L	W	D	D	L	D	D	W	L	L	L	W	W	D	D	W	D	W	L	W	W	D	D	W	D	D	D	W
Position	13	12	14	9	10	8	12	13	12	11	12	12	12	12	12	11	11	9	9	8	9	8	8	7	8	8	8	8	8	8

Source: Competitive matches
A = Away; H = Home; W = Win; D = Draw; L = Loss; = 1985–86 European Cup; = 1985–86 UEFA Cup

==== Matches ====
16 September 1984 1	Verona	3–1	Napoli	Verona
	Briegel 26'; Galderisi 33'; Di Gennaro 75'	Report	Bertoni 58'

23 September 1984 2	Napoli	1–1	Sampdoria	Naples
	Maradona 62' (pen.)	Report	Salsano 72'	Stadium: San Paolo

30 September 1984 3	Torino	3–0	Napoli	Turin
	Serena 1, 79'; Francini 57'	Report		Stadium: Comunale

7 October 1984 4	Napoli	3–0	Como	Naples
	Bertoni 16'; Maradona 27'; Penzo 56'	Report		Stadium: San Paolo

14 October 1984 5	Lazio	1–1	Napoli	Rome
	D'Amico 35'	Report	Maradona 51'	Stadium: Olimpico

21 October 1984 6	Napoli	0–0	Milan	Naples
		Report		Stadium: San Paolo

28 October 1984 7	Atalanta	1–0	Napoli	Bergamo
	Soldà 32'	Report		Stadium: Atleti Azzurri d'Italia

11 November 1984 8	Napoli	0–0	Avellino	Naples
		Report		Stadium: San Paolo

18 November 1984 9	Ascoli	1–1	Napoli	Ascoli Piceno
	Vincenzi 51'	Report	Penzo 8'	Stadium: Cino e Lillo del Duca

25 November 1984 10	Napoli	1–0	Cremonese	Naples
	Bertoni 27'	Report		Stadium: San Paolo

2 December 1984 11	Inter	2–1	Napoli	Milan
	Rummenigge 63'; Altobelli 88'	Report	Caffarelli 47'	Stadium: Giuseppe Meazza

16 December 1984 12	Napoli	1–2	Roma	Naples
	Bertoni 45'	Report	Falcão 20'; Marino 78' (o.g.)	Stadium: San Paolo

23 December 1984 13	Juventus	2–0	Napoli	Turin
	Briaschi 42'; Platini 62'	Report		Stadium: Comunale

6 January 1985 14	Napoli	4–3	Udinese	Naples
	Maradona 22' (pen.), 74' (pen.); Bertoni 40, 82'	Report	Edinho 12'; Miano 43'; Billia 85'	Stadium: San Paolo

13 January 1985 15	Fiorentina	0–1	Napoli	Florence
		Report	Maradona 49'	Stadium: Comunale

20 January 1985 16	Napoli	0–0	Verona	Naples
		Report		Stadium: San Paolo

27 January 1985 17	Sampdoria	0–0	Napoli	Genoa
		Report		Stadium: Luigi Ferraris

10 February 1985 18	Napoli	2–1	Torino	Naples
	Maradona 23' (pen.); Caffarelli 45'	Report	Júnior 7'	Stadium: San Paolo

17 February 1985 19	Como	1–1	Napoli	Como
	Todesco 58'	Report	Maradona 17' (pen.)

24 February 1985 20	Napoli	4–0	Lazio	Naples
	Maradona 58, 84, 87'; Filisetti 78' (o.g.)	Report		Stadium: San Paolo

3 March 1985 21	Milan	2–1	Napoli	Milan
	Battistini 15'; Incocciati 68'	Report	Wilkins 35' (o.g.)	Stadium: San Siro

17 March 1985 22	Napoli	1–0	Atalanta	Naples
	Bertoni 21'	Report		Stadium: San Paolo

24 March 1985 23	Avellino	0–1	Napoli	Avellino
		Report	Caffarelli 64'

31 March 1985 24	Napoli	1–1	Ascoli	Naples
	Maradona 84'	Report	Cantarutti 56'	Stadium: San Paolo

14 April 1985 25	Cremonese	1–1	Napoli	Cremona
	Bonomi 57'	Report	Bertoni 53'

21 April 1985 26	Napoli	3–1	Inter	Naples
	Bertoni 18, 63'; Dal Fiume 50'	Report	G. Baresi 39'	Stadium: San Paolo

28 April 1985 27	Roma	1–1	Napoli	Rome
	Dal Fiume 72' (o.g.)	Report	Bertoni 40'	Stadium: Olimpico

5 May 1985 28	Napoli	0–0	Juventus	Naples
		Report		Stadium: San Paolo

12 May 1985 29	Udinese	2–2	Napoli	Udine
	Galparoli 8'; De Agostini 55'	Report	Maradona 4, 88'	Stadium: Friuli

19 May 1985 30	Napoli	1–0	Fiorentina	Naples
	Caffarelli 39'	Report		Stadium: San Paolo

==== Topscorers ====
- (Argentina) Diego Maradona 14
- (Argentina) Daniel Bertoni 11
- (Italy) Luigi Caffarelli 6

=== Coppa Italia ===
Group phase

22 August 1984 1	Napoli	4–1	Arezzo	Naples
	Maradona 20'; Penzo 52'; Bertoni 64'; De Vecchi 77'		36' Tovalieri	Stadium: Stadio San Paolo

26 August 1984 2	Casertana	0–3	Napoli	Naples
			18' (pen.) Maradona; 44' Penzo; 48' Bertoni	Stadium: Stadio San Paolo

29 August 1984 3	Perugia	0–0	Napoli	Perugia
				Stadium: Stadio Renato Curi

2 September 1984 4	Pescara	0–3	Napoli	Pescara
			16' Penzo; 51' Bertoni; 82' Maradona	Stadium: Stadio Adriatico

9 September 1984 5	Napoli	1–1	Fiorentina	Naples
	Bertoni 65'		55' Monelli	Stadium: Stadio San Paolo

Eightfinals

13 February 1985	Milan	2–1	Napoli	Milan
	Battistini 14'; Di Bartolomei 51' (pen.)		46' Bagni	Stadium: Stadio San Siro

27 February 1985	Napoli	1–1 (2–3 agg.)	Milan	Naples
	Caffarelli 78'		40' Battistini	Stadium: Stadio San Paolo

== Statistics ==
=== Players statistics ===
No.	Pos	Nat	Player	Total		Serie A	
No.	Pos	Nat	Player	Apps	Goals	Apps	Goals
	GK	(Italy) ITA	Castellini	25	-27	25	-27
	DF	(Italy) ITA	Bruscolotti	27	0	27	0
	DF	(Italy) ITA	Marino	22	0	22	0
	DF	(Italy) ITA	Ferrario	29	0	29	0
	MF	(Italy) ITA	Caffarelli	30	4	22+8	4
	MF	(Italy) ITA	De Vecchi	23	0	19+4	0
	MF	(Italy) ITA	Dal Fiume	24	0	23+1	0
	MF	(Italy) ITA	Celestini	26	0	26	0
	MF	(Italy) ITA	Bagni	25	0	25	0
	FW	(Argentina) ARG	Maradona	30	14	30	14
	FW	(Argentina) ARG	Bertoni	27	11	25+2	11
	GK	(Italy) ITA	Di Fusco	8	-2	5+3	-2
	DF	(Italy) ITA	De Simone	16	0	15+1	0
	DF	(Italy) ITA	Boldini	22	0	14+8	0
	FW	(Italy) ITA	Penzo	15	2	12+3	2
	DF	(Italy) ITA	Carannante	17	0	9+8	0
	MF	(Italy) ITA	Favo	5	0	1+4	0
	DF	(Italy) ITA	Ferrara	2	0	1+1	0
	FW	(Italy) ITA	Puzone	2	0	0+2	0
	DF	(Italy) ITA	Napolitano	1	0	0+1	0
	GK	(Italy) ITA	Zazzaro				

- Source: http://calcio-seriea.net/presenze/1984/913/

== Sources ==
- RSSSF - Italy 1984/85 (for stats)
- Italian Wikipedia (for squad)
