= Paolo Rossi =

Italian footballer (1956–2020)

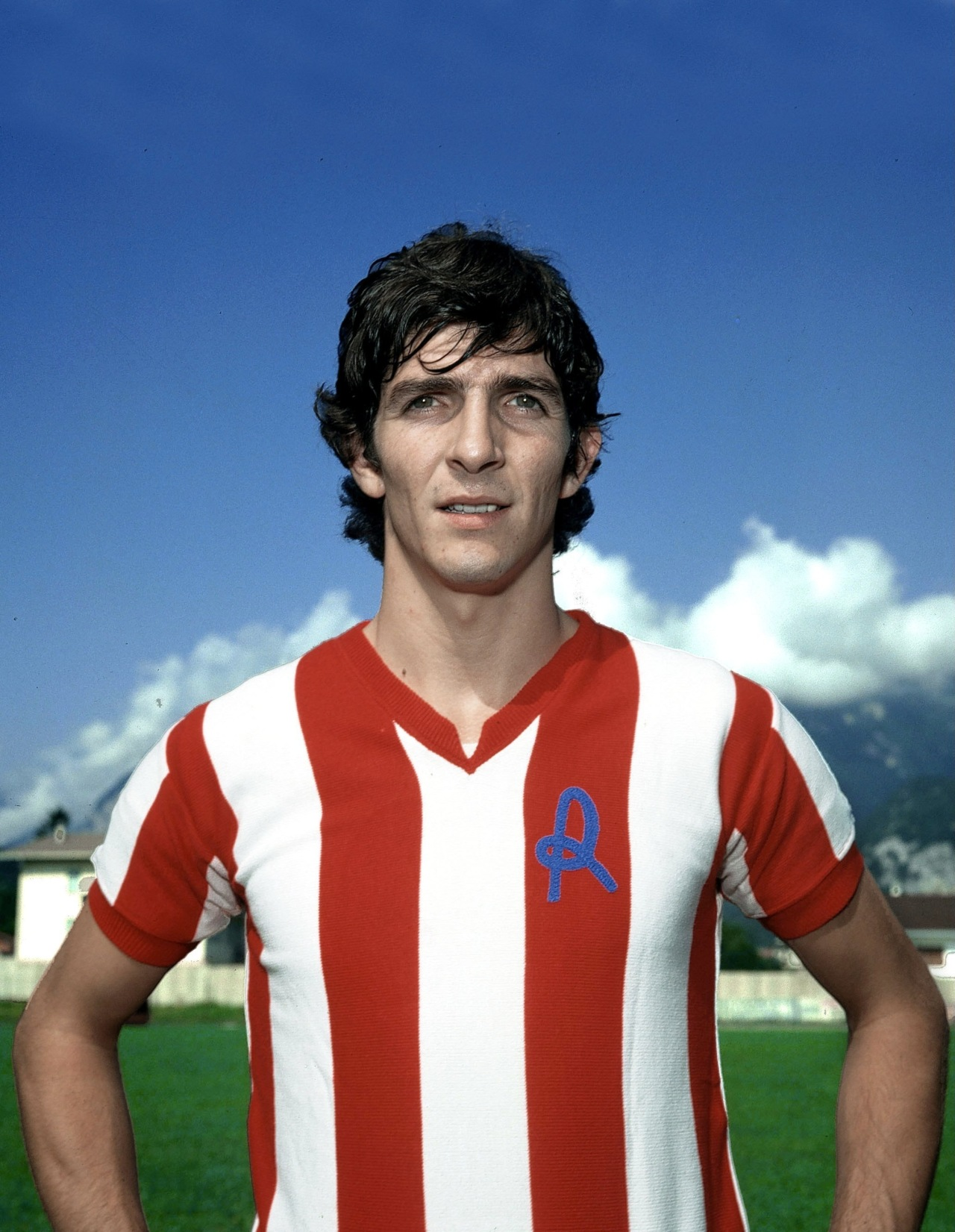
- Rossi with Vicenza

Personal information
- Date of birth: 23 September 1956
- Place of birth: Prato, Italy
- Date of death: 9 December 2020 (aged 64)
- Place of death: Siena, Italy
- Height: 1.74 m (5 ft 9 in)
- Position: Striker

Youth career
- 1961–1967: Santa Lucia
- 1967–1968: Ambrosiana
- 1968–1972: Cattolica Virtus
- 1972–1975: Juventus

Senior career*
Years	Team	Apps	(Gls)
1973–1976	Juventus	0	(0)
1975–1976	→ Como (loan)	6	(0)
1976–1980	Vicenza	94	(60)
1979–1980	→ Perugia (loan)	28	(13)
1981–1985	Juventus	83	(24)
1985–1986	AC Milan	20	(2)
1986–1987	Hellas Verona	20	(4)
Total		251	(103)

International career
1977–1986	Italy	48	(20)
Medal record
Men's football
Representing Italy
FIFA World Cup
Winner	1982 Spain
- * Club domestic league appearances and goals

Paolo Rossi (Italian pronunciation: [ˈpaːolo ˈrossi]; 23 September 1956 – 9 December 2020) was an Italian professional footballer who played as a striker. He led Italy to the 1982 FIFA World Cup title, scoring six goals to win the Golden Boot as top goalscorer, and the Golden Ball for the player of the tournament. Rossi was also awarded the 1982 Ballon d'Or as the European Footballer of the Year for his performances (remaining the only player in history to win these four awards in a single year). Along with Roberto Baggio and Christian Vieri, he is Italy's top scorer in World Cup history, with nine goals overall.

At club level, Rossi was also a prolific goalscorer for Vicenza. In 1976, he was signed to Juventus from Vicenza in a co-ownership deal for a world record transfer fee. Vicenza retained his services, and he was the top goalscorer in Serie B in 1977, leading his team to promotion to Serie A. The following season, Rossi scored 24 goals, becoming the first player to top the scoring charts in Serie B and Serie A in consecutive seasons. Rossi made his debut for Juventus in 1981, and went on to win two Serie A titles, the Coppa Italia, the UEFA Cup Winners' Cup, the UEFA Super Cup, and the European Cup. With success at club and international level, he is one of eleven players to have won the FIFA World Cup, the UEFA Champions League and the Ballon d'Or.

Widely regarded as one of the greatest Italian footballers of all time, Rossi was named in 2004 by Pelé as one of the Top 125 greatest living footballers as part of FIFA's 100th anniversary celebration. In the same year, Rossi placed 12th in the UEFA Golden Jubilee Poll. After he retired from football, he worked as a pundit for Sky, Mediaset Premium, and Rai Sport, until his death on 9 December 2020.

== Career ==
=== Early years ===
Rossi was born in Prato, Tuscany, Italy in the area of Santa Lucia.

Although he was a member of the squad during the 1972–73 season, Rossi made his debut in professional football with Juventus in 1973, making an appearance in the Coppa Italia and winning a runners-up medal in the 1973 Intercontinental Cup. He was often injury-prone during his first few seasons, only making three Coppa Italia appearances with Juventus between 1972 and 1975, and scoring no goals. After three operations on his knees, he was later sent to gain experience with Como, where he made his Serie A debut during the 1975–76 season, initially playing as a right winger, where his small build would not be a hindrance; he made six Serie A appearances for the club, but again failed to score.

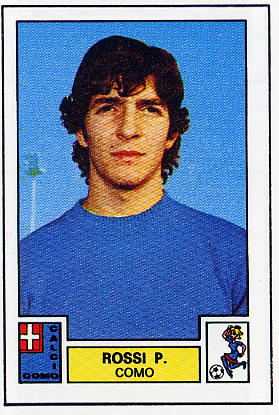
A young Paolo Rossi with Como in 1975

His career reached a turning point when Vicenza Calcio (then Lanerossi Vicenza) engaged him on loan. Coach Giovan Battista Fabbri decided to move him from the wing and place him in the centre of the attack (because of injuries to the then centre-forward) just before the season started. Rossi immediately showed a tremendous knack for getting open in the box and scoring, winning the Serie B Golden Boot with 21 goals in his first year in this more advanced position. In the 1976–77 season, Rossi's qualities as an implacable striker led his team to promotion to Serie A, and he also led Vicenza to the second group stage of the Coppa Italia that season. In the following season, Rossi scored 24 goals, becoming the first player to top the scoring charts in Serie B and Serie A in consecutive seasons, also leading Vicenza to a surprising second-place finish in Serie A during the 1977–78 season, only behind his co-owners Juventus. Due to his performances, he was selected by the Italy national team's manager Enzo Bearzot for the 1978 FIFA World Cup. Rossi was also given his Italy debut under Bearzot on 21 December 1977, in a 1–0 friendly away win over Belgium.

Rossi confirmed his growth during the 1978 World Cup tournament, gaining international fame as one of the world's best strikers. Playing for Italy as a central striker, he would sometimes switch positions with the two other forwards, going to his original right wing position. Right winger Franco Causio, a two-footed player, would go left, and Italy's tall left winger Roberto Bettega would go to the centre. This simple stratagem, made possible by the technical quality of all three players, created havoc for opposing defences, and Italy showed an entertaining offensive style of play in the tournament. Rossi totalled three goals and four assists as Italy finished in fourth place in that World Cup. He was named as part of the team of the tournament for his performances, and he also collected the Silver Ball as the second-best player of the World Cup. Rossi's goal in Italy's opening 2–1 group win of the tournament against France, on 2 June 1978, was also his first goal for Italy.

Up to this point, Rossi had been jointly owned by Vicenza and Juventus. When the two clubs were called to settle the property, Lanerossi offered the shocking sum of 2.612 billion lire for Rossi, who became the world's most expensive player, and Italy's most costly sportsman ever at that point. After the 1978 World Cup, during the 1978–79 season, Rossi made his European debut with Vicenza in the UEFA Cup, however, despite scoring 15 goals for the club in Serie A, his season was marked by injuries, and Vicenza was relegated to Serie B. Rossi was subsequently loaned to Perugia, to play in Serie A the following season.

=== Match-fixing scandal ===
While at Perugia, he managed 13 goals in Serie A during the 1979–80 season, also helping the club reach the round of 16 of the UEFA Cup. During the season, however, he was involved in the infamous 1980 betting scandal known in Italy as Totonero, and as a result of this, Rossi was disqualified for three years, although this was later reduced to a two-year ban. As a result, Rossi missed out on the 1980 European Championship with Italy, where the team once again finished in fourth place, on home soil. Despite the ban, Rossi always claimed to be innocent, and stated that he had been a victim of an injustice.

=== 1982 World Cup ===
Despite his ban, Rossi was repurchased by Juventus in 1981, and he returned to the starting line-up just in time for the end of the 1981–82 season to contribute to the club's 1981–82 Serie A title (scoring one goal in three appearances) and to take part in the 1982 FIFA World Cup in Spain. Italian journalists and tifosi initially lamented that he was in very poor shape, however, and this view seemed to be confirmed by Italy's appalling performance in the three group matches, in which he was described as a "ghost aimlessly wandering over the field".

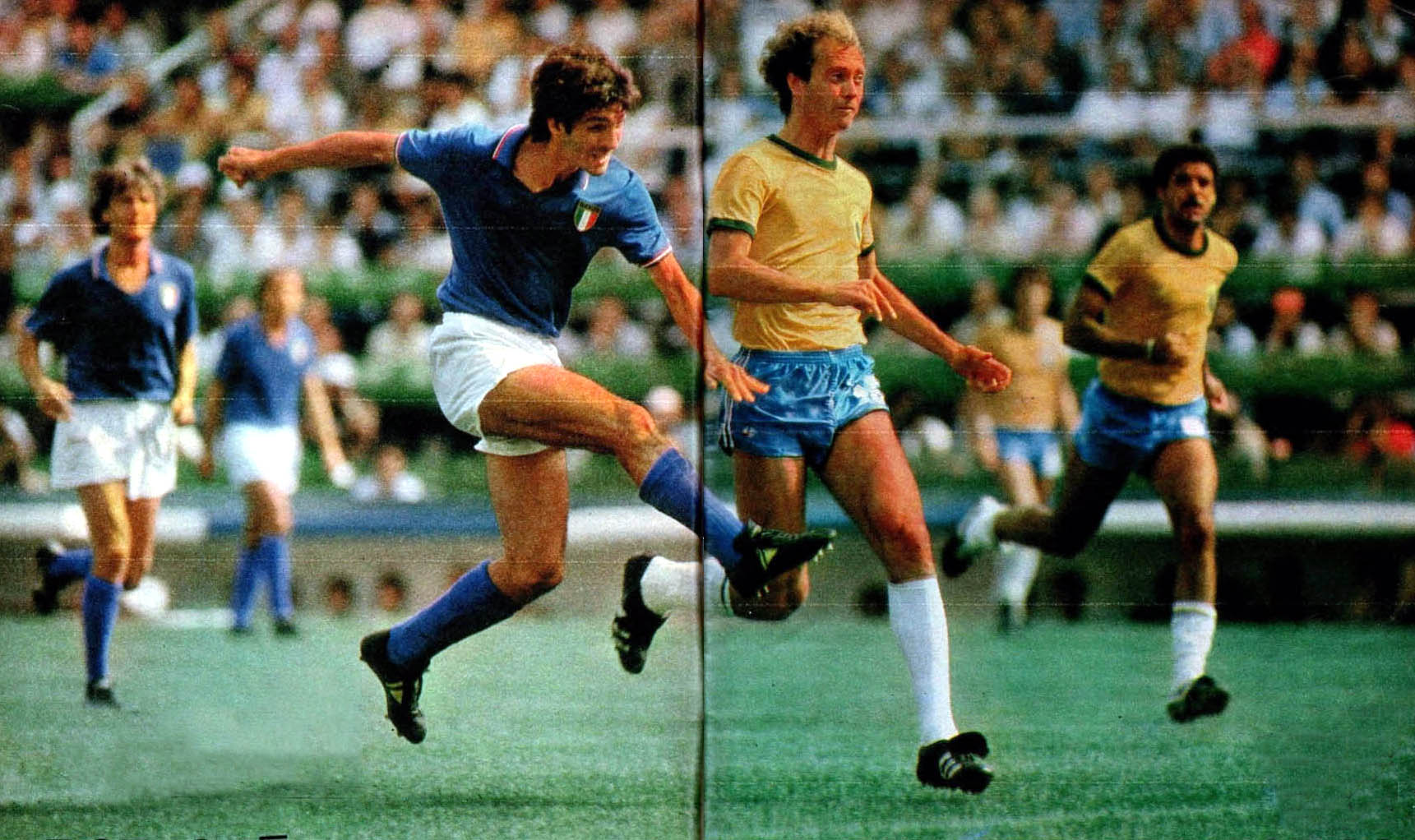
Rossi scoring the second of his three goals v Brazil at the 1982 World Cup

Italy manager Enzo Bearzot, however, staunchly confirmed Rossi for the decisive round-robin in the second round, in which his team was to face Argentina, the reigning World Cup winners, and Brazil, the favourites to win the title with a team consisting of world-class players such as Sócrates, Zico, and Falcão. After Italy defeated Argentina 2–1, partly thanks to the defensive work of Claudio Gentile and Gaetano Scirea, who shut down the young Argentine star Diego Maradona, Rossi scored a hat-trick to defeat Brazil 3–2 to qualify for the semi-finals. In the semi-final match against Poland, Rossi's two goals won the match for Italy once again, granting them a place in the 1982 World Cup final.

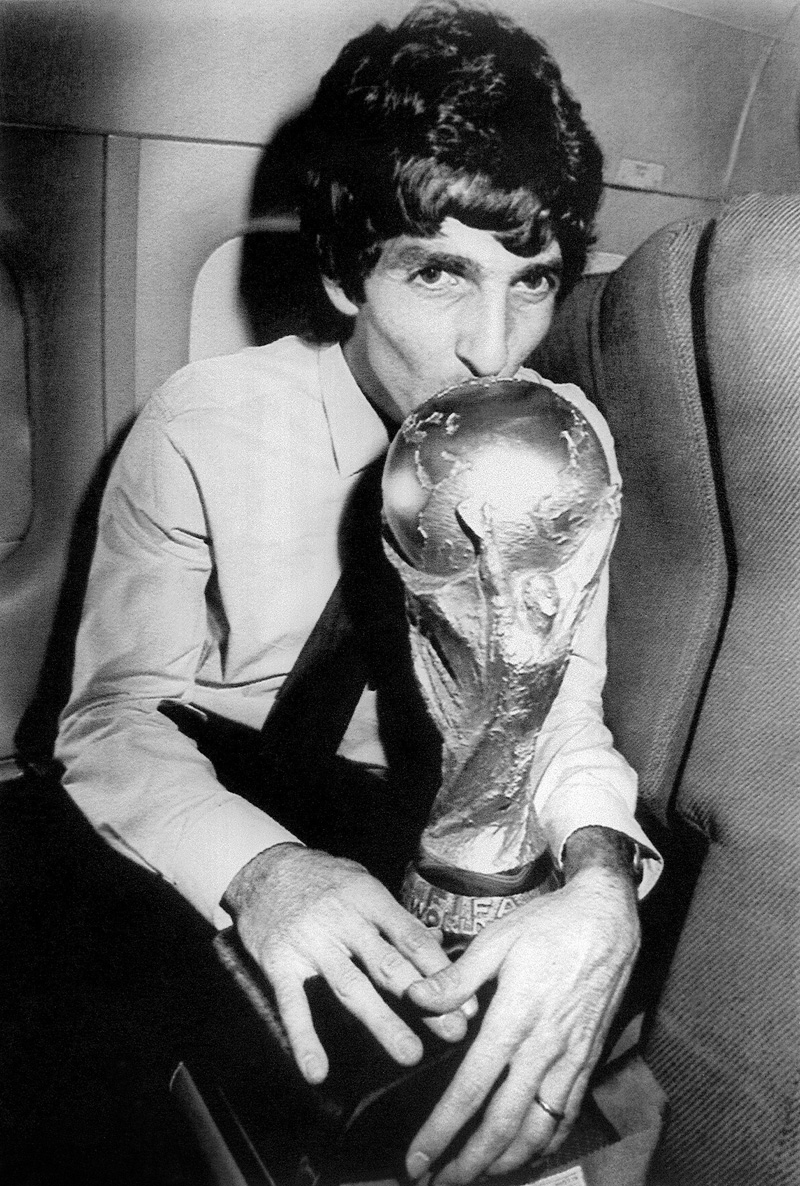
Paolo Rossi kisses the 1982 World Cup trophy

In the final against West Germany, Rossi scored the first of Italy's three goals, from an indirect set-piece assist from Gentile, helping Italy win the match 3–1, giving his team their third World Cup title. With six goals in total, he won the tournament's máximo goleador award, the Golden Boot, as the top scorer of the tournament, as well as the Golden Ball Award for the best player of the tournament, and he was named as part of the team of the tournament for the second consecutive time.

Italian fans hung banners proclaiming him "Man of the match". Rossi's accomplishments in Spain gained him the title of European Footballer of the Year and World Player of the Year in 1982, as well as the 1982 Onze d'Or Award. His goalscoring exploits during the tournament earned him the nicknames "Pablito" and the "torero". Between his goals and assists throughout the tournament, Rossi was directly responsible for 58% of his team's goals during the 1982 World Cup.

Rossi became a national hero in Italy for his six goals in the 1982 World Cup finals. Peter Mason, writing for The Guardian, noted that the World Cup final win, which was set up by Rossi's crucial first goal, "was a cathartic moment for the nation, which had been subject to significant social and political unrest for a number of years and, despite being regarded as one of the world's premier footballing nations, had not won a World Cup since 1938... With the victory came an incalculable lift to the nation’s spirits, and Rossi was at the centre of the celebrations."

== Later years and death ==
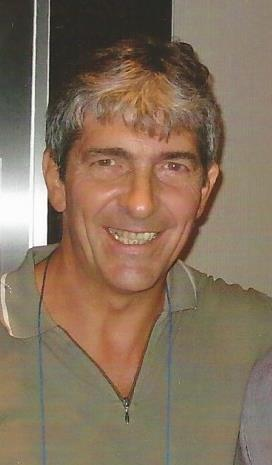
Rossi in 2007

After the 1982 World Cup, Rossi continued to play with Juventus. During the 1982–83 season, Juventus finished second in Serie A, although he helped the club to win the 1983 Coppa Italia, scoring five goals. He also helped Juventus to reach the 1983 European Cup Final, only to lose out to Hamburg; he finished the tournament as the top scorer, with six goals. During the 1983–84 season, Rossi won his second Scudetto title with the club, notably scoring 13 goals, also helping the club to win the 1983–84 UEFA Cup Winners' Cup, followed by the 1984 UEFA Super Cup. During his final season with the club, Rossi finally won the European Cup in 1985, finishing the tournament with 5 goals, behind only teammate Michel Platini and Torbjörn Nilsson, with 7 goals.

Following his tenure with Juventus, Rossi moved on to a then struggling Milan for a season in 1985. During his time with Milan, he was remembered for his two-goal performance against Internazionale in a Milan derby match. Rossi was also selected in Italy's squad for the 1986 FIFA World Cup in Mexico, but did not play in the competition; an injury caused him to struggle during the team's fitness tests, owing to the high altitude of the region. As a result, he was replaced by Giuseppe Galderisi up-front in the team's starting line-up. He made his final appearance for Italy on 11 May 1986, in a 2–0 friendly home win over China in Naples. He ended his club career at Hellas Verona during the 1986–87 season, helping them to a fourth-place finish in Serie A, before retiring at the end of the season. He was involved in real estate, together with his former teammate Giancarlo Salvi.

Rossi scored a total of 20 goals in 48 senior international caps for Italy. Rossi is Italy's joint all-time top goalscorer in the FIFA World Cup, with nine goals in 14 appearances over two editions of the tournament, alongside Roberto Baggio and Christian Vieri. Six of his World Cup goals came in seven appearances during Italy's passage to triumph in 1982, and three of his goals came in seven appearances during the 1978 tournament, when Italy finished in fourth place. Rossi represented Italy in the 1991 edition of the World Cup of Masters, scoring in the third place play-off against Uruguay.

Pelé named Rossi as one of the top 125 greatest living footballers in March 2004; during the same year, Rossi placed 12th in the UEFA Golden Jubilee Poll.

In August 1990, he was named vice-president of Lega Pro Prima Divisione club A.S. Pescina Valle del Giovenco.

Following his retirement he also worked as a pundit for Sky, Mediaset Premium, and Rai Sport.

Rossi died on 9 December 2020, at the age of 64, from lung cancer. Rossi was survived by his second wife, Federica Cappelletti, and three children. During his funeral in Vicenza on 12 December, attended by thousands, his house in Bucine was robbed.

== Style of play ==
Paolo Rossi is widely regarded as one of the greatest and most prolific Italian forwards of all time. Although he lacked the intimidating physical presence of a typical out-and-out striker, Rossi was a quick, agile, prolific, and elegant centre-forward, with good technique, balance, extremely quick reactions, an accurate shot, and an eye for goal, which enabled him to anticipate defenders in the box for the ball. He made up for his lack of strength, physicality, and shooting power with his keen sense of opportunism, intelligence, positional sense, and sharp finishing skills with both of his feet as well as with his head. This allowed him to excel in the air and beat out larger opponents for the ball, in spite of his relatively short stature. However, he was not particularly adept at set pieces. Although Rossi was primarily known as a striker who mainly operated in the penalty area, he began his career as a right winger, and in his later career with Juventus, he was also deployed as a supporting forward or as centre-forward, but in a role known as a centravanti di manovra in Italian football jargon (similar to the modern false 9 role), owing to the offensive attributes of the club's new signings in midfield, in particular Zbigniew Boniek and Michel Platini, where his role frequently involved holding up the ball or dragging opponents out of position to create space for his teammates' runs with his excellent attacking movement off the ball.

== Career statistics ==
=== Club ===
Appearances and goals by club, season and competition
Club	Season	League			Coppa Italia		Europe		Other		Total	
Club	Season	Division	Apps	Goals	Apps	Goals	Apps	Goals	Apps	Goals	Apps	Goals
Juventus	1973–74	Serie A	0	0	1	0	0	0	–		1	0
Juventus	1974–75	Serie A	0	0	2	0	0	0	–		2	0
Juventus	Total		0	0	3	0	0	0	–		3	0
Como	1975–76	Serie A	6	0	0	0	–		–		6	0
Lanerossi Vicenza	1976–77	Serie B	36	21	6	2	–		–		42	23
Lanerossi Vicenza	1977–78	Serie A	30	24	4	2	–		–		34	26
Lanerossi Vicenza	1978–79	Serie A	28	15	3	2	1 (Note: Appearance(s) in UEFA Cup)	0	–		32	17
Lanerossi Vicenza	Total		94	60	13	6	1	0	–		108	66
Perugia	1979–80	Serie A	28	13	4	0	4	1	–		36	14
Perugia	1980–81	Serie A	0	0	0	0	–		–		0	0
Perugia	Total		28	13	4	0	4	1	–		36	14
Juventus	1981–82	Serie A	3	1	0	0	0	0	–		3	1
Juventus	1982–83	Serie A	23	7	11	5	9 (Note: Appearances in European Cup)	6	–		43	18
Juventus	1983–84	Serie A	30	13	7	0	9 (Note: Appearances in European Cup Winners' Cup)	2	–		46	15
Juventus	1984–85	Serie A	27	3	6	2	9	5	1 (Note: Appearance in European Super Cup)	0	43	10
Juventus	Total		83	24	24	7	27	13	1	0	135	44
Milan	1985–86	Serie A	20	2	3	1	3	0	–		26	3
Hellas Verona	1986–87	Serie A	20	4	7	3	–		–		27	7
Career total			251	103	54	17	35	14	1	0	341	134

=== International ===
Appearances and goals by national team and year
National team	Year	Apps	Goals
Italy	1977	1	0
Italy	1978	10	4
Italy	1979	5	3
Italy	1980	3	0
Italy	1981	0	0
Italy	1982	11	6
Italy	1983	7	2
Italy	1984	6	3
Italy	1985	3	2
Italy	1986	2	0
Total		48	20

Scores and results list Italy's goal tally first, score column indicates score after each Rossi goal.

List of international goals scored by Paolo Rossi
No.	Date	Venue	Opponent	Score	Result	Competition
1	2 June 1978	Estadio Mundialista, Mar del Plata	France	1–1	2–1	1978 FIFA World Cup
2	6 June 1978	Estadio Mundialista, Mar del Plata	Hungary	1–0	3–1	1978 FIFA World Cup
3	18 June 1978	Estadio Monumental, Buenos Aires	Austria	1–0	1–0	1978 FIFA World Cup
4	21 December 1978	Stadio Olimpico, Rome	Spain	1–0	1–0	Friendly
5	24 February 1979	San Siro, Milan	Netherlands	2–0	3–0	Friendly
6	26 May 1979	Stadio Olimpico, Rome	Argentina	2–1	2–2	Friendly
7	13 June 1979	Stadion Maksimir, Zagreb	Yugoslavia	1–0	1–4	Friendly
8	5 July 1982	Estadio Sarriá, Barcelona	Brazil	1–0	3–2	1982 FIFA World Cup
9	5 July 1982	Estadio Sarriá, Barcelona	Brazil	2–1	3–2	1982 FIFA World Cup
10	5 July 1982	Estadio Sarriá, Barcelona	Brazil	3–2	3–2	1982 FIFA World Cup
11	8 July 1982	Camp Nou, Barcelona	Poland	1–0	2–0	1982 FIFA World Cup
12	8 July 1982	Camp Nou, Barcelona	Poland	2–0	2–0	1982 FIFA World Cup
13	11 July 1982	Estadio Santiago Bernabéu, Madrid	West Germany	1–0	3–1	1982 FIFA World Cup
14	5 October 1983	Stadio della Vittoria, Bari	Greece	3–0	3–0	Friendly
15	22 December 1983	Stadio Renato Curi, Perugia	Cyprus	3–1	3–1	UEFA Euro 1984 qualifier
16	4 February 1984	Stadio Olimpico, Rome	Mexico	2–0	5–0	Friendly
17	4 February 1984	Stadio Olimpico, Rome	Mexico	3–0	5–0	Friendly
18	4 February 1984	Stadio Olimpico, Rome	Mexico	4–0	5–0	Friendly
19	5 February 1985	Dalymount Park, Dublin	Republic of Ireland	1–0	2–1	Friendly
20	3 April 1985	Stadio Cino e Lillo Del Duca, Ascoli Piceno	Portugal	2–0	2–0	Friendly

== Honours ==
Vicenza

- Serie B: 1976–77

Juventus

- Serie A: 1981–82, 1983–84
- Coppa Italia: 1982–83
- European Cup: 1984–85; runner-up: 1982–83
- European Cup Winners' Cup: 1983–84
- UEFA Super Cup: 1984

Italy

- FIFA World Cup: 1982

Individual

- Capocannoniere: 1977–78 (24 goals)
- Serie B top scorer: 1976–77 (21 goals)
- FIFA World Cup Silver Ball: 1978
- FIFA World Cup All-Star Team: 1978, 1982
- Gazzetta Sports Awards Man of the Year: 1978
- Sport Ideal European XI: 1978
- World XI: 1979, 1986
- FIFA World Cup Golden Boot: 1982
- FIFA World Cup Golden Ball: 1982
- Onze d'Or: 1982
- Ballon d'Or: 1982
- World Soccer Men's World Player of the Year: 1982
- L'Équipe Champion of Champions: 1982
- Guerin Sportivo Player of the Year: 1982
- Guerin Sportivo All-Star Team: 1982
- European Cup top scorer: 1982–83
- World Soccer Greatest Players of the 20th century: 41st
- FIFA 100
- UEFA Golden Jubilee Poll: 12th
- Golden Foot "Football Legends": 2007
- Italian Football Hall of Fame: 2016
- Enzo Bearzot Award: 2020
- Juventus FC Hall of Fame: 2025
- IFFHS Legends
