= 1976–77 Serie B =

Italian football league season

Serie B
- Season: 1976–77
- Champions: Vicenza; 2nd title

Serie B 1976-77 team distribution

The Serie B 1976–77 was the forty-fifth tournament of this competition played in Italy since its creation.

== Teams ==
Monza, Rimini and Lecce had been promoted from Serie C, while Ascoli, Como and Cagliari had been relegated from Serie A.

== Final classification ==
Pos	Team	Pld	W	D	L	GF	GA	GD	Pts	Promotion or relegation
1	Lanerossi Vicenza (P, C)	38	18	15	5	47	29	+18	51	Promotion to Serie A
2	Pescara (P)	38	17	15	6	48	29	+19	49	Serie A after tie-breaker
3	Atalanta (P)	38	19	11	8	44	26	+18	49	Serie A after tie-breaker
4	Cagliari	38	17	15	6	45	32	+13	49	Promotion tie-breaker
5	Monza	38	17	14	7	46	27	+19	48	
6	Como	38	12	17	9	35	27	+8	41	
7	Lecce	38	13	13	12	33	32	+1	39	
8	Varese	38	12	14	12	41	37	+4	38	
9	Taranto	38	12	13	13	32	31	+1	37	
10	Ascoli	38	12	13	13	41	43	−2	37	
11	Sambenedettese	38	9	19	10	27	31	−4	37	
12	Rimini	38	9	15	14	25	27	−2	33	
13	Palermo	38	8	17	13	29	31	−2	33	
14	Modena	38	10	12	16	28	35	−7	32	
15	Avellino	38	10	12	16	27	37	−10	32	
16	Brescia	38	9	14	15	35	46	−11	32	
17	Ternana	38	11	10	17	32	45	−13	32	
18	S.P.A.L. (R)	38	6	19	13	29	37	−8	31	Relegation to Serie C
19	Catania (R)	38	6	19	13	26	44	−18	31	Relegation to Serie C
20	Novara (R)	38	7	15	16	34	48	−14	29	Relegation to Serie C

Source: Panini
(C) Champions; (P) Promoted; (R) Relegated

== Results ==
Home \ Away	ASC	ATA	AVE	BRE	CAG	CTN	COM	LRV	LCE	MOD	MON	NOV	PAL	PES	RIM	SBN	SPA	TAR	TER	VAR
Ascoli		0–0	3–1	2–1	1–1	4–2	1–1	2–1	1–0	1–0	2–0	1–0	2–0	0–0	0–0	1–0	2–2	0–0	2–0	1–0
Atalanta	2–0		1–0	2–0	2–0	3–1	1–0	2–1	3–1	1–0	1–0	4–1	1–0	2–1	2–0	0–0	1–0	2–0	2–0	2–4
Avellino	2–0	1–0		2–1	0–0	1–0	0–0	2–0	0–0	1–1	2–1	2–1	0–0	3–0	0–2	0–0	1–1	1–0	0–1	2–1
Brescia	0–0	1–2	1–1		1–2	4–1	2–2	2–3	1–0	1–0	1–1	0–2	2–0	2–1	3–0	0–0	0–0	1–0	1–1	1–4
Cagliari	3–2	3–2	2–0	4–1		1–1	0–0	1–1	0–2	2–0	1–1	1–0	1–0	2–1	1–0	1–0	0–0	2–1	3–0	3–2
Catania	1–1	1–1	1–0	1–1	1–2		2–1	0–1	0–0	1–0	0–0	3–2	1–1	0–0	0–0	0–0	0–0	1–0	0–1	2–0
Como	4–0	0–0	1–0	1–1	0–0	2–0		0–2	1–0	2–0	1–1	1–1	2–3	0–0	1–0	2–0	0–0	2–0	2–1	3–0
L.R. Vicenza	1–1	1–0	2–2	1–0	1–0	3–0	2–0		0–0	2–1	3–2	1–1	1–0	0–1	1–0	2–1	3–1	0–0	0–0	2–0
Lecce	2–1	2–0	1–1	2–0	0–0	0–0	0–0	1–1		1–0	0–0	2–1	2–2	0–1	1–1	1–0	4–1	1–0	1–0	3–1
Modena	1–0	0–1	1–0	0–0	0–0	4–2	3–0	1–1	0–0		2–1	2–1	0–0	1–0	1–0	2–2	1–0	1–1	1–1	1–0
Monza	3–2	1–1	2–0	2–0	0–0	3–0	0–0	1–1	1–0	1–0		2–0	2–0	1–0	1–0	4–0	1–0	2–1	2–0	2–1
Novara	0–0	1–0	2–1	0–0	0–0	2–1	0–1	1–2	2–1	1–1	0–0		1–1	3–3	0–0	2–1	1–0	1–1	1–2	1–1
Palermo	2–1	1–0	1–0	2–2	1–1	0–0	0–3	0–1	1–2	2–0	1–0	2–2		0–0	2–2	0–0	1–0	0–0	1–1	0–0
Pescara	2–1	0–0	3–1	2–2	3–0	0–0	0–0	2–1	2–0	2–0	2–2	1–0	3–1		1–0	1–1	3–1	1–1	3–1	1–0
Rimini	0–0	0–0	3–0	2–0	1–2	0–0	3–1	0–0	0–1	1–0	1–1	2–1	0–0	1–2		0–1	1–0	2–0	0–0	1–0
Sambenedettese	1–1	0–0	0–0	1–0	1–1	0–0	2–0	0–0	4–1	1–0	1–1	1–0	2–1	0–0	1–1		1–1	2–1	2–0	0–0
SPAL	2–1	1–1	1–0	0–1	1–1	1–1	1–1	1–1	0–0	1–1	0–1	1–1	1–1	2–4	1–1	2–0		1–0	4–0	0–0
Taranto	2–1	1–1	2–0	0–0	2–1	1–1	1–0	0–0	2–1	1–0	0–0	3–0	3–1	0–2	1–0	2–0	1–0		3–1	1–1
Ternana	3–2	3–1	1–0	0–1	1–2	1–1	0–0	2–3	2–0	1–0	1–2	0–0	2–0	0–0	0–0	2–0	0–1	1–0		1–2
Varese	3–1	0–0	0–0	2–0	2–1	3–0	0–0	1–1	1–0	2–2	2–1	3–1	0–1	0–0	1–0	1–1	0–0	0–0	2–1	

Source: Almanacco Illustrato del Calcio - La Storia 1898-2004, Panini Edizioni, Modena, September 2005 (in Italian)
Legend: Blue = home team win; Yellow = draw; Red = away team win.

== Promotion tie-breaker ==
Team 1	Score	Team 2
Atalanta (Italy)	2-1	(Italy) Cagliari
Atalanta (Italy)	0-0	(Italy) Pescara
Cagliari (Italy)	0-0	(Italy) Pescara

Atalanta and Pescara promoted to Serie A.

== Attendances ==
#	Club	Average
1	Atalanta	21,208
2	Cagliari	21,019
3	Vicenza	16,342
4	Pescara	15,523
5	Lecce	13,367
6	Taranto	12,048
7	Palermo	11,962
8	Ascoli	10,794
9	SPAL	10,599
10	Brescia	9,876
11	Modena	9,332
12	Ternana	9,302
13	Rimini	8,539
14	Catania	8,237
15	Avellino	8,108
16	Como	7,767
17	Sambenedettese	7,028
18	Monza	6,844
19	Novara	4,712
20	Varese	4,619

== References and sources ==
- Almanacco Illustrato del Calcio - La Storia 1898-2004, Panini Edizioni, Modena, September 2005

Specific
