= Boniek Forbes =

Footballer (born 1983)

Personal information
- Full name: Boniek Manuel Gomes Forbes
- Date of birth: 30 September 1983 (age 43)
- Place of birth: Guinea-Bissau
- Height: 5 ft 10 in (1.78 m)
- Position: Winger

Youth career
- ?–2002: Leyton Orient

Senior career*
Years	Team	Apps	(Gls)
2002–2004	Leyton Orient	13	(0)
2004	Ford United	4	(0)
2004	Chelmsford City	1	(0)
2004	Heybridge Swifts	14	(0)
2004–2005	Hornchurch	4	(0)
2005	Bishop's Stortford	10	(2)
2005–2006	Thurrock		
2006	Enfield Town		
2006	East Thurrock United		
2006	Brimsdown Rovers		
2006–10	Cheshunt		
- * Club domestic league appearances and goals

Boniek Manuel Gomes Forbes (born 30 September 1983) is a former footballer who played as a winger. He played for Leyton Orient in the Football League. He received his first name Boniek after famous Polish international player Zbigniew Boniek.

After initially performing 'very well as a sub early in the season', Forbes struggled for playing time towards the end of the 2003/04 season with manager Martin Ling pointing towards his lack of versatility as an issue, and as a result his contract was mutually terminated before the end of the campaign, at the time he was expected to join Aldershot Town F.C on trial.

Forbes left Cheshunt F.C. in the summer of 2010, joining Boreham Wood F.C. on trial soon after.
