= 1982 Ballon d'Or =

Annual association football award event in France

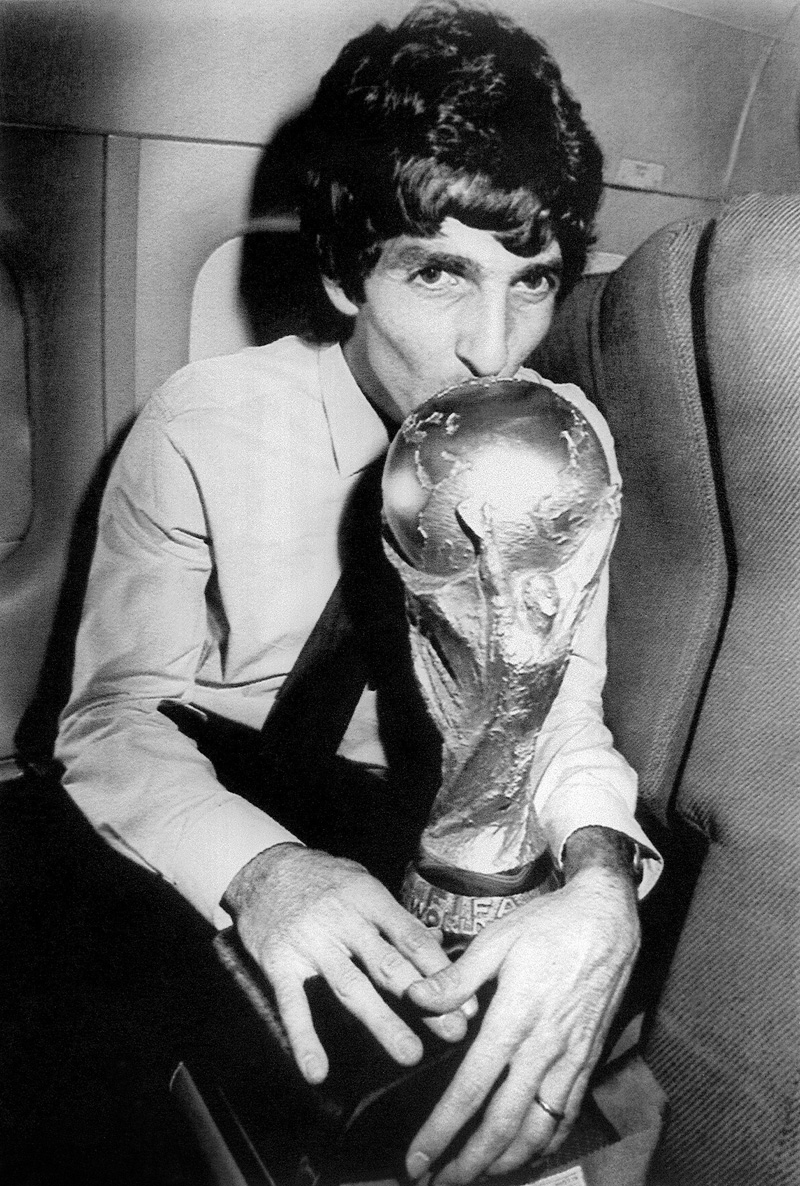
- 1982 Ballon d'Or winner, Paolo Rossi
- Date: 28 December 1982
- Presented by: France Football

Highlights
- Won by: (Italy) Paolo Rossi (1st award)
- Website: ballondor.com

The 1982 Ballon d'Or, given to the best football player in Europe as judged by a panel of sports journalists from UEFA member countries, was awarded to Paolo Rossi on 28 December 1982.

Rossi was the third Italian national to win the award after Omar Sívori in 1961 and Gianni Rivera in 1969. Rossi was also the second Juventus player to win the trophy, after Sívori in 1961.

== Rankings ==
Rank	Name	Club(s)	Nationality	Points
1	Paolo Rossi	(Italy) Juventus	Italy	115
2	Alain Giresse (Note: France Football reports Giresse with 68 points.)	(France) Bordeaux	France	64
3	Zbigniew Boniek	(Italy) Juventus	Poland	53
4	Karl-Heinz Rummenigge (Note: France Football reports Rummenigge with 47 points.)	(West Germany) Bayern Munich	West Germany	51
5	Bruno Conti	(Italy) Roma	Italy	48
6	Rinat Dasayev	(Soviet Union) Spartak Moscow	Soviet Union	17
7	Pierre Littbarski	(West Germany) 1. FC Köln	West Germany	10
8	Dino Zoff	(Italy) Juventus	Italy	9
9	Michel Platini	(Italy) Juventus	France	5
10	Bernd Schuster	(Spain) Barcelona	West Germany	4
11	Giancarlo Antognoni	(Italy) Fiorentina	Italy	3
12	Bruno Pezzey	(West Germany) Eintracht Frankfurt	Austria	2
12	Gaetano Scirea	(Italy) Juventus	Italy	2
12	Eric Gerets	(Belgium) Standard Liège	Belgium	2
15	Paul Breitner	(West Germany) Bayern Munich	West Germany	1
15	Torbjörn Nilsson	(Sweden) IFK Göteborg	Sweden	1
15	Walter Schachner	(Italy) Cesena	Austria	1
15	Marco Tardelli	(Italy) Juventus	Italy	1
15	Marius Trésor	(France) Bordeaux	France	1
