= Józef Boniek =

Polish footballer and manager (1931–2019)

Personal information
- Date of birth: 12 March 1931
- Place of birth: Nakło nad Notecią, Poland
- Date of death: 12 December 2019 (aged 88)
- Place of death: Bydgoszcz, Poland
- Height: 1.82 m (6 ft 0 in)
- Position: Central defender

Youth career
- Czarni Nakło

Senior career*
Years	Team	Apps	(Gls)
1946–1952	Czarni Nakło		
1952–1958	Zawisza Bydgoszcz	100	(1)
1959–1961	Polonia Bydgoszcz	60	(0)

Managerial career
- 1966–1968: Czarni Nakło
- Unia Solec Kujawski
- Gwiazda Bydgoszcz
- * Club domestic league appearances and goals

Józef Boniek (12 March 1931 – 12 December 2019) was a Polish professional footballer who played as a central defender and a manager.

== Club career ==
Having made an impression at his local club, he won the Pomeranian championship in 1952. He spent the rest of his career in Bydgoszcz. First he was a leading player at Zawisza, where he made over 100 appearances. He then moved to Polonia making 60 appearances. He was also a leading player at the club, being known for his efficient and tough style of play. He retired from playing after Polonia was relegated from the top division.

== Career statistics ==
Appearances and goals by club, season and competition
Club	Season	League	League		National cup		Total	
Club	Season	League	Matches	Goals	Matches	Goals	Matches	Goals
Polonia Bydgoszcz	1959	Ekstraklasa	22	0	—		22	0
Polonia Bydgoszcz	1960	Ekstraklasa	19	0	—		19	0
Polonia Bydgoszcz	1961	Ekstraklasa	19	0	0	0	19	0
Career total			60	0	0	0	60	0

== Managerial career ==
He went to coach lower league clubs in the area starting at the same club he started his playing career.

== Personal life ==
He was the father of Zbigniew Boniek. He was an electrician by profession, he worked in a thermal power plant in Bydgoszcz. He also performed electrical work on facilities belonging to the Zawisza club. He also had the qualifications of a football instructor.

He died at the age of 88. He was buried on 14 December 2019 at the cemetery at the Tańskich Street in Bydgoszcz.
