= Domenico Penzo =

Italian footballer (born 1953)

Personal information
- Date of birth: 17 October 1953 (age 73)
- Place of birth: Chioggia, Italy
- Height: 1.80 m (5 ft 11 in)
- Position: Striker

Youth career
- Varese

Senior career*
Years	Team	Apps	(Gls)
1972–1973	Borgosesia	33	(8)
1973–1974	Romulea	30	(12)
1974–1975	Roma	19	(1)
1975	Piacenza	2	(0)
1975–1976	Benevento	27	(12)
1976–1978	Bari	70	(22)
1978–1979	Monza	37	(11)
1979–1981	Brescia	62	(16)
1981–1983	Verona	60	(29)
1983–1984	Juventus	25	(5)
1984–1986	Napoli	21	(2)
1987–1988	Trento	12	(2)
Total		398	(120)
- * Club domestic league appearances and goals

Domenico Penzo (born 17 October 1953) is an Italian retired professional footballer, who played as a forward.

== Early life ==
Penzo was born in Chioggia, Venice, in Veneto; he is one of seven siblings. His father was a fisherman. When he was seven, Penzo moved to Baranzate with his family. After leaving school at the age of 14, he began working as a carpenter, and then as a mechanic at his brother-in-law's auto-repair shop; he initially played football with his friends and for several local teams, before pursuing a professional football career.

== Career ==
A Varese youth product, Penzo began his footballing career at the age of 19, in Serie D, with Borgosesia in 1972, before moving to another Serie D side, Romulea for a season in 1973, where he made a name for himself as a promising striker, due to his eye for goal. In 1974, he was acquired by Roma, as a striker-partner for Pierino Prati; he struggled to gain playing time with the capital club, however, and only made 19 appearances during the 1974–75 season, scoring just one goal, which came in an away win over Fiorentina.

In 1975, Penzo was transferred to newly promoted Serie B side Piacenza in a co-ownership deal. He struggled to fit into manager Giovan Battista Fabbri's system, however, and after three months, having failed to score and having made only two appearances as a substitute for the club, he was transferred to Serie C side Benevento, where he scored 12 league goals in 27 appearances during the 1975–76 season. The following season, he moved to Serie C side Bari, helping the club obtain promotion to Serie B with his prolific goalscoring, totalling 27 goals across his two seasons in Serie C. After another season in Serie B with Monza, he was sold to Brescia in 1979, helping the club achieve promotion to Serie A with 12 goals; the following season however, he struggled to find the back of the net, scoring only 4 times in 27 appearances, as Brescia suffered relegation at the end of the season.

Penzo joined Serie B side Verona in 1981; under manager Osvaldo Bagnoli, he became a key player for the club, and scored 14 goals in 31 appearances during the 1981–82 season, helping Verona obtain promotion to Serie A. His best individual season was in the 1982–83 season, when, playing as a lone striker, he scored 15 league goals with Verona to become the second-best scorer of the season in the Serie A, alongside Alessandro Altobelli, and behind only Michel Platini, who scored one more, and won the Capocannoniere title with 16 goals. Penzo also helped Verona reach the Coppa Italia final, scoring 7 times in 13 appearances, including the decisive goal against Milan in the quarter-finals, and a goal in Verona's 2–0 home win in the first leg of the final against Juventus; however, Verona lost out on aggregate following a 3–0 defeat in extra-time in the second leg.

Penzo's performances prompted the Turin club, for whom Platini coincidentally played, to purchase him from Verona the following season at the age of 30, in exchange for the co-ownership of Giuseppe Galderisi and Massimo Storgato; Penzo was initially intended to be a replacement for the recently departed Roberto Bettega, who had left Juventus to play football in Canada. Penzo immediately won the Serie A title, in what was to be his only season with the club, as his performances did not convince the Juventus management to renew his contract. Although he gelled well with his strike partner Paolo Rossi, his spell with Juventus was less successful than his time at Verona from an individual standpoint; however, he was less consistent and was ultimately unable to replicate his goalscoring form from the previous season with the Turin side, only managing 5 league goals in 25 appearances, and often starting from the bench. Despite his struggles in front of goal in the league throughout the season, he starred for the club in the 1983–84 European Cup Winners' Cup, as Juventus also went on to win the competition that season; during the tournament, he achieved a rare feat of scoring 4 goals in the same game, which he managed in a 7–0 first round home win against Lechia Gdańsk on 14 September 1983. In total, he scored 10 goals in 36 appearances across all competitions for Juventus.

Penzo spent the next season with Napoli, where he initially played alongside Diego Maradona, although following the arrival of Bruno Giordano, he struggled both to score and break into the starting line-up, and ended his professional career at the end of the season in 1986. After being ruled out of the Napoli first team the following season, he joined Serie C1 side Trento for the 1987–88 season, and officially retired from football in 1988.

In total, Penzo played 6 seasons (122 games, 27 goals) in the Italian Serie A, and made 136 appearances in Serie B, scoring 44 goals.

== After retirement ==
Following his retirement, Penzo returned to live in Verona, where he worked as a sporting goods representative. He later also worked as a football pundit and commentator for local television stations in Verona.

== Style of play ==
A tall, powerful, and physically strong centre-forward, with an eye for goal, Penzo excelled in the air, courtesy of his height and heading accuracy; due to his good technique, he was also known for his ability to make runs with the ball at speed and strike the ball powerfully on the run. An intelligent and hard-working forward, although he was capable of playing as a lone striker, he was also known for his ability to play off of other forwards, and usually performed at his best alongside a faster and more opportunistic striker, such as his Verona strike-partner Mauro Gibellini, and his Juventus strike-partner Paolo Rossi. Although he was regarded as a promising prospect in his youth, he was at times inconsistent at the top level in his later career.

== Honours ==
Juventus

- Serie A champion: 1983–84.
- UEFA Cup Winners' Cup winner: 1983–84.
