= Cezary Kulesza =

Polish football administrator (born 1962)

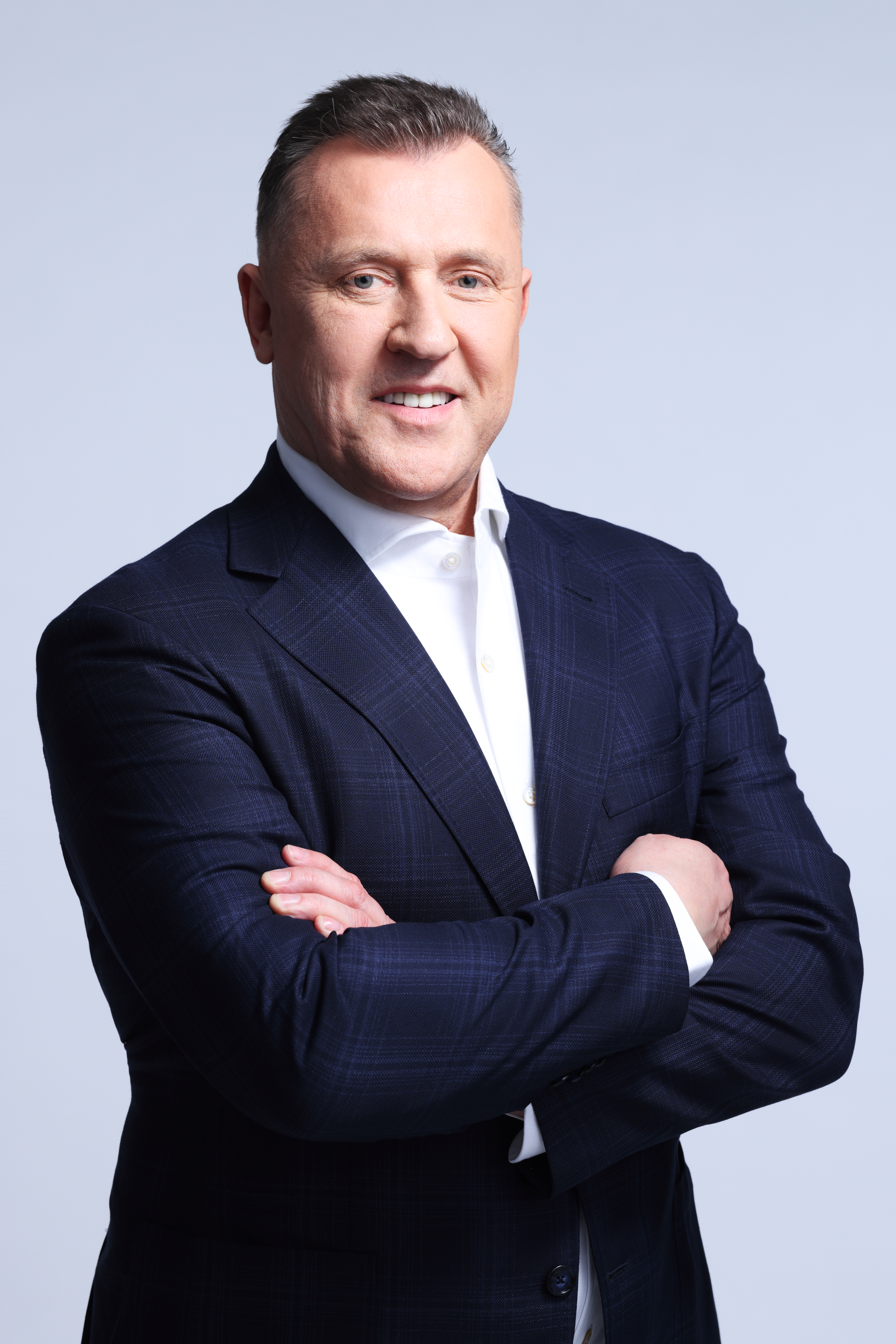
- Kulesza in 2021

27th President of the PZPN
- Incumbent
- Assumed office 18 August 2021
- Preceded by: Zbigniew Boniek

Personal details
- Born: Cezary Andrzej Kulesza; 22 June 1962 (age 64) Wysokie Mazowieckie, Poland
- Height: 1.76 m (5 ft 9 in)
- Occupation: Footballer; Football administrator; Businessman
Association football career
- Position: Midfielder
Youth career
- Gwardia Białystok
Senior career*
Years	Team	Apps	(Gls)
1981–1982	Gwardia Białystok		
1982–1984	Olimpia Zambrów		
1984–1987	Mławianka Mława		
1988–1990	Jagiellonia Białystok	14	(0)
1990	Jagiellonia Białystok II		
1991	Royal Aubel		
1992	Jagiellonia Białystok II		
1992–1993	MZKS Wasilków		
1995–1996	Supraślanka Supraśl		
- * Club domestic league appearances and goals

Cezary Andrzej Kulesza (born 22 June 1962) is a Polish football executive and former player, currently serving as the president of the Polish Football Association (PZPN). He played in the Ekstraklasa and was the chairman of Jagiellonia Białystok from 2010 to 2021.

== Football career ==
Kulesza played as an attacking midfielder and forward. He began his football journey with Gwardia Białystok, joining the senior team at the beginning of the 1981–82 season. In 1982, he transferred to Olimpia Zambrów, where he made 13 appearances in the third division during the 1982–83 season. In 1988, he moved from Mławianka Mława to Jagiellonia Białystok, where he played 14 matches in the top division and participated in the losing final of the 1988–89 Polish Cup.

In 1991, he played for RFC Aubel in the Belgian third division. He later returned to Poland, playing several matches with Jagiellonia's reserve team. He also played for MZKS Wasilków and Supraślanka Supraśl, where he ended his football career.

== Business career ==
After retiring from football, Kulesza pursued a career in business. In 1994, he founded the record label Green Star, which represents some of the biggest stars of Polish dance music (dance, disco polo). Kulesza is also involved in the real estate and hospitality industries.

== Sports executive career ==
=== Jagiellonia Białystok ===
Since 2008, Kulesza has served as a sports advisor and proxy at Jagiellonia Białystok, later becoming a board member. On 20 January 2010, he was appointed president of the board, replacing the outgoing Ireneusz Trąbiński. During his tenure, Jagiellonia enjoyed significant success, including two runner-up finishes in the Polish league, a bronze medal, the Polish Cup, a Polish Cup final appearance, the Polish Super Cup, and five UEFA competition participations. The club also promoted many Polish national team players during this period, including Jacek Góralski, Bartosz Kwiecień, Taras Romanczuk, Karol Świderski, and Przemysław Frankowski.

=== Polish Football Association ===
On 18 August 2021, Kulesza became the 35th president of the Polish Football Association, defeating Marek Koźmiński in the second round of voting. He was supported by, among others, delegates from the lower leagues.
