= 1977–78 Serie A =

75th season of top-tier Italian football

Serie A
- Season: 1977–78
- Dates: 11 September 1977 – 7 May 1978
- Champions: Juventus; 18th title
- Relegated: Genoa; Foggia; Pescara
- European Cup: Juventus
- Cup Winners' Cup: Internazionale
- UEFA Cup: Vicenza; Torino; Milan; Napoli
- Matches: 240
- Goals: 512 (2.13 per match)
- Top goalscorer: Paolo Rossi (24 goals)

Serie A 1977-78 team distribution

The 1977–78 Serie A season was won by Juventus.

== Teams ==
Vicenza, Atalanta and Pescara had been promoted from Serie B.

== Final classification ==
Pos	Team	Pld	W	D	L	GF	GA	GD	Pts	Qualification or relegation
1	Juventus (C)	30	15	14	1	46	17	+29	44	Qualification to European Cup
2	Vicenza	30	14	11	5	50	34	+16	39	Qualification to UEFA Cup
3	Torino	30	14	11	5	36	23	+13	39	Qualification to UEFA Cup
4	Milan	30	12	13	5	38	25	+13	37	Qualification to UEFA Cup
5	Internazionale	30	13	10	7	35	24	+11	36	Qualification to Cup Winners' Cup
6	Napoli	30	8	14	8	35	31	+4	30	Qualification to UEFA Cup
7	Perugia	30	10	10	10	36	35	+1	30	
8	Roma	30	8	12	10	31	34	−3	28	
9	Atalanta	30	6	15	9	28	32	−4	27	
10	Hellas Verona	30	6	14	10	25	30	−5	26	
11	Lazio	30	8	10	12	31	38	−7	26	
12	Bologna	30	7	12	11	21	32	−11	26	
13	Fiorentina	30	7	11	12	28	37	−9	25	
14	Genoa (R)	30	5	15	10	23	33	−10	25	Relegation to Serie B
15	Foggia (R)	30	8	9	13	28	43	−15	25	Relegation to Serie B
16	Pescara (R)	30	4	9	17	21	44	−23	17	Relegation to Serie B

Source: Panini
(C) Champions; (R) Relegated

== Results ==
Home \ Away	ATA	BOL	FIO	FOG	GEN	INT	JUV	LRV	LAZ	MIL	NAP	PER	PES	ROM	TOR	HEL
Atalanta		0–0	0–0	1–2	1–1	0–1	0–2	2–4	1–1	1–1	1–1	1–1	2–0	0–1	0–0	1–0
Bologna	0–0		0–1	2–1	2–1	2–1	1–1	3–2	2–1	0–0	0–0	2–3	1–1	0–0	1–3	0–3
Fiorentina	2–2	0–0		1–1	0–0	0–2	1–1	1–3	0–1	1–1	1–0	2–1	3–0	2–0	2–0	1–2
Foggia	1–0	1–0	1–1		1–1	0–2	0–0	1–1	3–1	1–2	1–1	0–1	2–0	0–0	1–0	4–0
Genoa	0–1	0–0	2–1	0–0		1–1	2–2	1–2	2–1	1–1	1–1	2–0	1–0	1–0	1–2	2–2
Internazionale	1–0	0–1	2–1	2–1	2–0		0–1	2–0	1–1	1–3	1–0	2–0	0–0	4–2	0–0	0–0
Juventus	1–1	1–0	5–1	6–0	4–0	2–2		3–2	3–0	1–1	1–0	2–0	2–0	2–0	0–0	1–0
Vicenza	2–2	3–0	1–0	2–0	1–0	1–2	0–0		2–1	1–1	0–0	3–1	1–1	4–3	0–0	1–0
Lazio	0–2	0–1	1–0	1–1	0–0	1–0	3–0	1–3		2–0	1–1	2–0	2–1	1–1	1–1	1–1
Milan	0–1	1–0	5–1	2–0	2–2	0–0	0–0	3–1	0–2		0–1	2–2	2–0	1–0	1–1	1–1
Napoli	2–2	0–0	0–0	5–0	0–0	2–2	1–2	1–4	4–3	1–1		3–2	1–1	2–0	1–3	3–0
Perugia	1–1	2–0	2–1	3–1	0–0	1–1	0–0	1–1	4–0	0–1	2–0		2–1	3–2	2–0	0–1
Pescara	0–0	2–1	1–2	1–2	0–0	2–1	1–2	1–2	1–0	0–2	1–3	1–1		1–1	2–1	2–2
Roma	3–1	1–1	2–2	1–0	1–0	1–2	1–1	1–1	0–0	1–2	0–0	2–0	2–0		2–1	2–1
Torino	3–2	2–0	1–0	3–1	3–1	1–0	0–0	2–2	1–0	1–0	1–0	1–1	2–0	1–1		2–1
Hellas Verona	1–2	1–1	0–0	3–1	2–0	0–0	0–0	0–0	2–2	1–2	0–1	0–0	1–0	0–0	0–0	

Updated to match(es) played on unknown. Source: Almanacco Illustrato del Calcio - La Storia 1898-2004, Panini Edizioni, Modena, September 2005 (in Italian)
Legend: Blue = home team win; Yellow = draw; Red = away team win.

== Top goalscorers ==
Rank	Player	Club	Goals
1	(Italy) Paolo Rossi	Vicenza	24
2	(Italy) Giuseppe Savoldi	Napoli	16
3	(Italy) Bruno Giordano	Lazio	12
3	(Italy) Paolo Pulici	Torino	12
5	(Italy) Roberto Bettega	Juventus	11
5	(Italy) Francesco Graziani	Torino	11
7	(Italy) Alessandro Altobelli	Internazionale	10
7	(Italy) Agostino Di Bartolomei	Roma	10
7	(Italy) Roberto Boninsegna	Juventus	10
10	(Italy) Roberto Pruzzo	Genoa	9
10	(Italy) Emiliano Mascetti	Hellas Verona	9
10	(Italy) Carlo Muraro	Internazionale	9
13	(Italy) Aldo Maldera	Milan	8
13	(Italy) Walter Speggiorin	Perugia	8

== Attendances ==
No.	Club	Average Attendance	Change (%)
1	SSC Napoli	61,612	-13.4%
2	AC Milan	48,907	19.3%
3	Internazionale	41,323	-4.7%
4	AS Roma	40,956	11.0%
5	Juventus FC	40,472	-3.4%
6	Torino FC	38,818	-4.2%
7	SS Lazio	38,786	2.3%
8	ACF Fiorentina	37,614	18.6%
9	Genoa CFC	34,300	-0.1%
10	Bologna FC	31,966	15.8%
11	Atalanta BC	28,953	36.5%
12	Vicenza Calcio	23,876	46.1%
13	Hellas Verona	23,053	-8.5%
14	Pescara Calcio	20,317	30.9%
15	AC Perugia	19,092	8.6%
16	Foggia Calcio	16,417	-3.3%

== References and sources ==
- Almanacco Illustrato del Calcio - La Storia 1898-2004, Panini Edizioni, Modena, September 2005
