= Dino Galparoli =

Italian footballer (born 1957)

Personal information
- Date of birth: 1 June 1957 (age 69)
- Place of birth: Tradate
- Position: Defender

Senior career*
| Years | Team | Apps | (Gls) |
| 1975–1978 | Reggiana | | |
| 1978–1981 | Brescia | | |
| 1981–1990 | Udinese | | |
| 1990–1992 | Alessandria | | |
| 1992–1995 | Cuneo | | |
- * Club domestic league appearances and goals

Dino Galparoli (born 1 June 1957) is a retired Italian football defender.
