= Polish Football Association =

Sports governing body organizing association football in Poland

UEFA
- Short name: PZPN
- Founded: 20 December 1919; 106 years ago
- Headquarters: Warsaw
- FIFA affiliation: 20 April 1923; 103 years ago
- UEFA affiliation: 2 March 1955; 71 years ago
- President: Cezary Kulesza
- Website: www.pzpn.pl

The Polish Football Association (Polish: Polski Związek Piłki Nożnej; PZPN) is the governing body of association football in Poland. It organizes the Polish football leagues (without the Ekstraklasa), the national cups, and manages the men's and women's national teams. It also runs the national futsal and beach soccer competitions. It is based in the Polish capital of Warsaw.

== History ==
The fully-independent federation was established on 20 December 1919 subsuming the autonomous Polish Football Union (PFU) that was part of the disintegrated Austrian Football Union. The PFU was established on 25 June 1911 in Lwów, Austria-Hungary.

When the Wehrmacht invaded Poland in September 1939, all Polish institutions and associations were dissolved, including the PZPN. The German occupying forces forbade Poles to organise football matches.

In September 2008, the leadership of the Polish Football Association was suspended by the Polish Olympic Committee for "[violating] its statutes in a continuous and flagrant fashion". One year earlier, the Polish sports ministry also made an attempt to address corruption within the Polish Football Association, but was threatened with suspension by FIFA, which forbids any form of government intervention. On 30 October 2008, Grzegorz Lato became the president of the Polish Football Association. On 26 October 2012, Zbigniew Boniek was elected president after winning 61 votes from 118 delegates.

The football association turned 100 years with the 2019 FIFA U-20 World Cup during its centennial year. In 2019, Józef Klotz, who had played for the Poland national football team and was killed in the Warsaw Ghetto during the Holocaust, was honored by the Association. On 28 August 2021, Cezary Kulesza was elected president.

== Provincial associations ==
The PZPN is divided into 16 provincial associations, corresponding to the 16 voivodeships of Poland.

Region	Association
Lower Silesian Voivodeship	Lower Silesian Football Association
Kuyavian-Pomeranian Voivodeship	Kuyavian-Pomeranian Football Association
Lublin Voivodeship	Lublin Football Association
Lubusz Voivodeship	Lubusz Football Association
Łódź Voivodeship	Łódź Football Association
Lesser Poland Voivodeship	Lesser Poland Football Association
Masovian Voivodeship	Masovian Football Association
Opole Voivodeship	Opole Football Association
Podkarpackie Voivodeship	Podkarpackie Football Association
Podlaskie Voivodeship	Podlaskie Football Association
Pomeranian Voivodeship	Pomeranian Football Association
Silesian Voivodeship	Silesian Football Association
Świętokrzyskie Voivodeship	Świętokrzyskie Football Association
Warmian-Masurian Voivodeship	Warmian-Masurian Football Association
Greater Poland Voivodeship	Greater Poland Football Association
West Pomeranian Voivodeship	West Pomeranian Football Association

== Presidents ==
N.	President	Tenure	Notes
1.	Edward Cetnarowski	20 December 1919 – 15 January 1928	
2.	Władysław Bończa-Uzdowski	15 January 1928 – 20 February 1937	
3.	Kazimierz Glabisz	20 February 1937 – 1 September 1939	
4.	Tadeusz Kuchar	29 June 1945 – 16 February 1946	
5.	Władysław Bończa-Uzdowski	16 February 1946 – 1949	
6.	Andrzej Przeworski	1949 – 1951	
7.	Jerzy Bordziłowski	1951 – 1953	
8.	Jan Rotkiewicz	1953 – 1954	
9.	Roman Gajzler	1954 – 1954	
10.	Władysław Rajkowski	1954 – 1956	
11.	Stefan Glinka	1956 – 1961	
12.	Wit Hanke	1961 – 1966	
13.	Wiesław Ociepka	1966 – 1972	
14.	Stanisław Nowosielski	1972 – 1973	
15.	Jan Maj	1973 – 1976	
16.	Edward Sznajder	1976 – 1978	
17.	Marian Ryba	1978 – 1981	
18.	Włodzimierz Reczek	1981 – 1985	
19.	Edward Brzostowski	1985 – 1986	
20.	Zbigniew Jabłoński	1986 – 1989	
21.	Jerzy Domański	1989 – 25 March 1991	
22.	Kazimierz Górski	25 March 1991 – 3 July 1995	
23.	Marian Dziurowicz	3 July 1995 – 28 June 1999	
-	Wiesław Pakoca	25 May 1998 – 7 August 1998	curator
24.	Michał Listkiewicz	28 June 1999 – 30 October 2008	
-	Andrzej Rusko	19 January 2007 – 1 February 2007	curator
-	Marcin Wojcieszak	1 February 2007 – 5 March 2007	curator
-	Robert Zawłocki	29 September 2008 – 10 October 2008	curator
25.	Grzegorz Lato	30 October 2008 – 26 October 2012	
26.	Zbigniew Boniek	26 October 2012 – 18 August 2021	
27.	Cezary Kulesza	18 August 2021 – present	
