= Zbigniew Boniek =

Polish footballer and manager (born 1956)

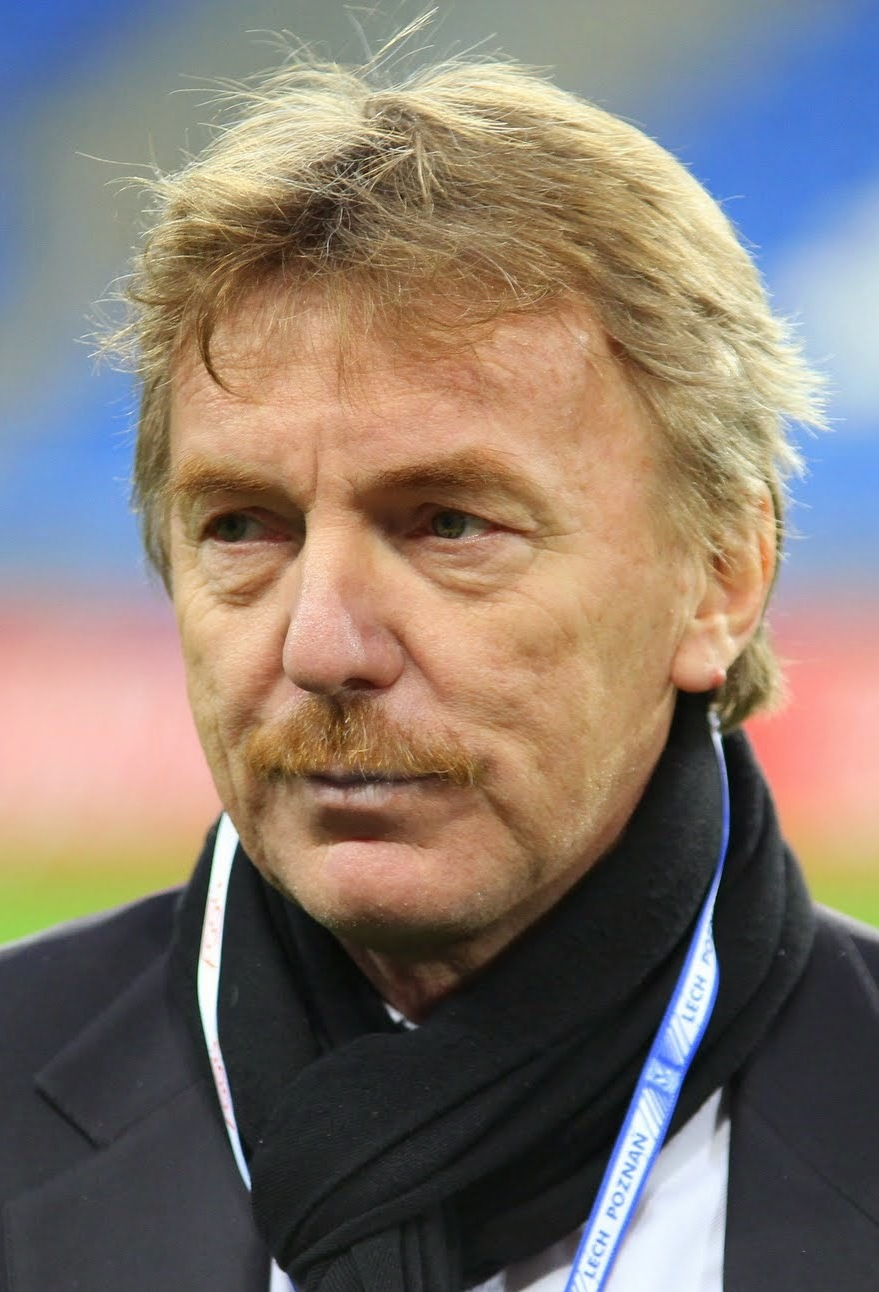
- Boniek in 2015

UEFA Vice President
- In office 20 April 2021 – 3 April 2025 Serving with Armand Duka, David Gill, Gabriele Gravina and Laura McAllister
- President: Aleksander Čeferin
- Vice President: Karl-Erik Nilsson (as first vice-president)

26th President of the PZPN
- In office 26 October 2012 – 18 August 2021
- Preceded by: Grzegorz Lato
- Succeeded by: Cezary Kulesza

Personal details
- Born: 3 March 1956 (age 70) Bydgoszcz, Poland
- Height: 1.82 m (6 ft 0 in)
- Occupation: Footballer; Football administrator
Association football career
- Positions: Midfielder; forward; sweeper
Youth career
- 1966–1973: Zawisza Bydgoszcz
Senior career*
Years	Team	Apps	(Gls)
1973–1975	Zawisza Bydgoszcz	41	(14)
1975–1982	Widzew Łódź	172	(50)
1982–1985	Juventus	81	(14)
1985–1988	Roma	76	(17)
Total		367	(95)
International career
1976–1988	Poland	80	(24)
Managerial career
- 1990–1991: Lecce
- 1991–1992: Bari
- 1992–1993: Sambenedettese
- 1994–1996: Avellino
- 2002: Poland
Medal record
Men's football
Representing Poland
FIFA World Cup
Third place	1982 Spain
- * Club domestic league appearances and goals

Zbigniew Boniek (Polish pronunciation: [ˈzbiɡɲɛv ˈbɔɲɛk]; (Note: In isolation, Zbigniew is pronounced [ˈzbiɡɲɛf].) born 3 March 1956) is a Polish former footballer and was most recently a UEFA vice-president. A former midfielder, who was also capable of playing mostly as a right winger and second striker, he is considered one of the greatest Polish players of all time, and was selected by Pelé as one of the 100 best living footballers in 2004.

In an 80-cap international career, Boniek scored 24 goals and played at three consecutive World Cups, helping Poland to 3rd place in 1982 and making the Team of the Tournament. His greatest achievements in club football were at Juventus in Italy, winning the Serie A, Coppa Italia, European Cup, European Cup Winners' Cup, and European Super Cup between 1983 and 1985, being the first Polish footballer to win a confederation title and one of the first Central and Eastern European players to do so with a non-conational club. In 1978 and 1982, he won the Polish Footballer of the Year Award presented by the Piłka Nożna football weekly.

In the early 1990s, Boniek managed several Italian clubs, and also the Poland national team in 2002. In 2019, he was inducted in the Italian Football Hall of Fame.

== Club career ==
Boniek was born in Bydgoszcz. He first played for Polish clubs Zawisza Bydgoszcz and later at Widzew Łódź.

Boniek transferred to Italian football giants Juventus in 1982. With Juventus he won the Coppa Italia in his first season, also managing a second-place finish in the league and reaching the 1983 European Cup Final in the same season. The following season, his performances proved decisive, as Juventus won both the Serie A title and the Cup Winners' Cup in 1984, with Boniek scoring the matching-winning goal in the 2–1 victory over Porto in the final of the latter tournament in Basel; he followed up these victories by claiming the European Super Cup later that year, scoring twice in the 2–0 win against Liverpool. He also won the European Cup in 1985, against Liverpool once again, winning the controversial penalty that Michel Platini subsequently converted to win the title for Juventus, after being fouled by Gary Gillespie just outside the box, although the team's victory was overshadowed by the Heysel Disaster.

The following season, Boniek joined Roma, where he won a second Coppa Italia in 1986, and eventually ended his professional career with the club in 1988.

== International career ==
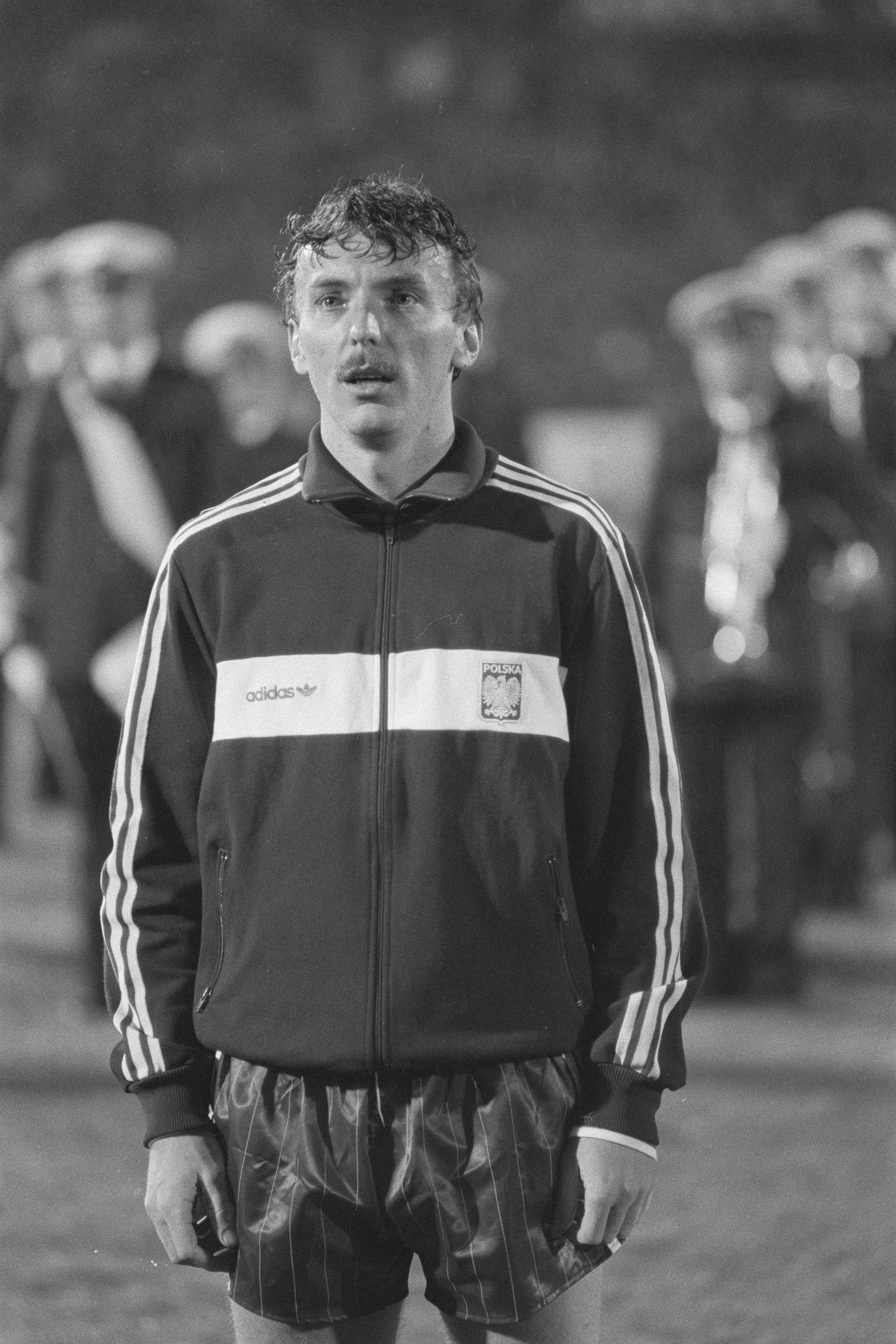
Zbigniew Boniek, top scorer for Poland in the 1982 World Cup

Boniek represented the Poland national team in 80 international matches between 1976 and 1988, and scored 24 goals. He took part at the 1978, 1982, and 1986 FIFA World Cups with Poland.

Although he initially only appeared as a substitute in Poland's two opening group matches at the 1978 FIFA World Cup, he drew attention to himself when he scored two goals in a 3–1 victory over Mexico in Poland's final match of the group stage, helping his nation top their group; in the second round, however, Poland finished third in their group and were eliminated from the tournament.

Boniek later starred in the Polish team that won a bronze medal at the 1982 FIFA World Cup in Spain: he helped his team reach the semi-finals of the tournament, scoring four goals in the process. In the first round, he scored in a 5–1 win over Peru on 22 June, to help Poland top their group; in the second round, he scored a hat-trick in his nation's 3–0 second round victory over Belgium, in Barcelona, on 28 June, but was forced to miss the semi-final defeat to eventual champions Italy due to a suspension after being booked in the 88th minute of a 0–0 draw against the Soviet Union.

He returned to the starting line-up for the victorious third-place match against France and was named to the team of the tournament for his performances throughout the competition. The 1986 FIFA World Cup was less successful, as Poland only qualified for the second round as the second best third-placed team, and were subsequently eliminated in the second round following a 4–0 defeat to Brazil.

== Player profile ==
=== Style of play ===
Although Boniek was usually deployed as a midfielder, he was also able to play as a forward. He preferred to operate between the lines in a free role, although he was a versatile player, capable of playing in several offensive and midfield positions on either flank or through the centre, and throughout his career he was deployed as an attacking midfielder, as a right winger, in a playmaking role as a central midfielder, as a centre-forward, or as a second striker; his Juventus manager, Giovanni Trapattoni, however, often struggled to find the most suitable position for him.

Boniek was known for his moustache and distinctive appearance. He was a forward who played for Juventus alongside Michel Platini. Boniek was noted for his pace, movement, and ability to make attacking runs behind the defensive line, often connecting with long passes from Platini. Diego Maradona described Boniek as “one of the finest players of their generation.”

A skilful footballer, he is considered by some as one of the best dribblers of his time and also displayed his own technique, flair, and class. While not considered a prolific scorer, he was noted for his finishing ability with both feet and in the air, as well as a consistent goalscoring record across his career. He also developed a reputation for scoring in high-stakes matches.

Despite his ability, at times he was also criticised, however, for being tactically undisciplined, inconsistent, too static in his movements off the ball, and for not being involved enough in his team's play during matches, which led him to struggle against opponents who did not give him a lot of space.

The Juventus president at the time of Boniek's tenure with the club, Gianni Agnelli, nicknamed him Bello di notte ("Beauty at night", which is a play on the title of the Buñuel movie Belle de Jour) because of his excellent performances in European club tournament matches, which were played in the evening; indeed, during continental tournaments, his opponents usually allowed him more space and time on the ball than in Serie A, which allowed him to get forward, undertake individual dribbling runs and score goals himself, or drop deep, link up with midfielders and create chances or provide assists for his teammates, courtesy of his passing, vision, and clever movement. He was also nicknamed Zibì by the Italian press.

Towards the end of his career, as he lost his pace, he often functioned in a defensive role as a sweeper.

=== Legacy ===
Boniek is considered one of the greatest players of his generation, and one of the best and most beloved Polish players ever, as well as one of the best players in the history of both Serie A and Juventus. However, in 2010, he was controversially not included among the Turin based club's 50 stars; Boniek was vocally critical of his exclusion on Twitter, and in particular of the fact that Edgar Davids had been chosen in his place, despite the doping allegations against the latter.

Honduran international footballer Óscar Boniek García was given the middle name Boniek in honour of Zbigniew Boniek. García chose to have the name "Boniek" written across the back of his jersey while playing for Houston.

Boniek Forbes (born 30 September 1983) is a Guinea-Bissau footballer who plays as a winger for Cheshunt. He played for Leyton Orient in the Football League.

In 2018, Boniek became an honorary citizen of Łódź. In 2019, he was named the most influential person in Polish sport by the Forbes Polska magazine and Pentagon Research. The same year, he was voted as a member of Poland's Team of the Century in a poll organized on the 100th anniversary of the foundation of the Polish Football Association.

In 2020, Boniek's biography entitled Zibi, czyli Boniek written by Roman Kołtoń was published. The footballer himself also published his autobiography the same year entitled Zbigniew Boniek. Mecze mojego życia (Zbigniew Boniek: The Matches of My Life).

== Managerial career ==
Following his retirement, Boniek pursued a coaching career, but with less success; he also coached in Italy, with stints at Lecce in 1990–91, Bari in 1991–92, Sambenedettese in 1992–93, and Avellino in 1994–96.

Boniek has served as vice-president of the Polish Football Association, and in July 2002 he became the manager of Poland. He resigned in December 2002, after just five matches (2 wins, 1 draw, 2 defeats, including a 1–0 home loss against Latvia in a European Championship qualifier).

== Later career ==
Following his retirement, Boniek had a successful business career. He later also worked as a pundit and football commentator. According to Polish sources, Boniek had been favoured to become the new Minister of Sport for his country, but he denied the claims and stated that he had no intention of taking the job.

In 2004, Boniek was named by Pelé as one of the 125 Greatest Living Footballers, as part of FIFA's centenary celebrations. On 12 October 2009, he received the Golden Foot 'Legend' career award.

On 26 October 2012, he became the chairman of the Polish Football Association. He is popular for speaking in favour of decriminalising football fans by legalising pyrotechnics inside stadiums, a common practice among ultras. His term of office ended on 18 August 2021, and he was succeeded by Cezary Kulesza.

== Personal life ==
Boniek has a university diploma in education. His father, Józef Boniek, was also a professional football player and later a manager. In 1976, he married his wife Wiesława, a specialist in Romance studies, with whom he has three children: two daughters Karolina and Kamila and son Tomasz.

== Career statistics ==
=== Club ===
Appearances and goals by club, season and competition
Club	Season	League			Cup		Continental		Total	
Club	Season	Division	Apps	Goals	Apps	Goals	Apps	Goals	Apps	Goals
Widzew Łódź	1975–76	Ekstraklasa	27	7	0	0	0	0	27	7
Widzew Łódź	1976–77	Ekstraklasa	24	9	1	0	0	0	25	9
Widzew Łódź	1977–78	Ekstraklasa	30	11	2	1	4	3	36	15
Widzew Łódź	1978–79	Ekstraklasa	28	4	1	1	0	0	29	5
Widzew Łódź	1979–80	Ekstraklasa	26	10	2	1	2	1	30	12
Widzew Łódź	1980–81	Ekstraklasa	11	1	0	0	5	0	16	1
Widzew Łódź	1981–82	Ekstraklasa	26	8	3	2	2	0	31	10
Widzew Łódź	Total		172	50	9	5	13	4	194	59
Juventus	1982–83	Serie A	28	5	12	3	9	2	49	10
Juventus	1983–84	Serie A	27	3	6	2	9	4	42	9
Juventus	1984–85	Serie A	26	6	6	3	10	3	42	12
Juventus	Total		81	14	24	8	28	9	133	31
Roma	1985–86	Serie A	29	7	5	1	0	0	34	8
Roma	1986–87	Serie A	26	4	6	4	2	0	34	8
Roma	1987–88	Serie A	21	6	3	1	0	0	24	7
Roma	Total		76	17	14	6	2	0	92	23
Career total			329	81	47	19	43	13	419	113

=== International ===
Appearances and goals by national team and year
National team	Year	Apps	Goals
Poland	1976	6	2
Poland	1977	11	1
Poland	1978	12	5
Poland	1979	10	3
Poland	1980	5	2
Poland	1981	6	3
Poland	1982	8	4
Poland	1983	3	1
Poland	1984	6	1
Poland	1985	5	2
Poland	1986	7	0
Poland	1987	0	0
Poland	1988	1	0
Total		80	24

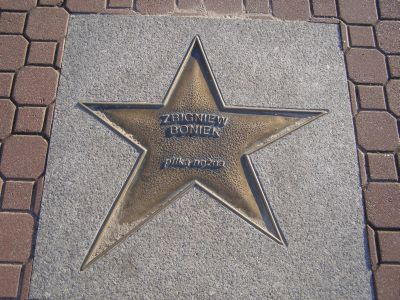
’’Boniek Star’’, Władysławowo, Poland

=== International goals ===
Scores and results list Poland's goal tally first, score column indicates score after each Boniek goal.

List of international goals scored by Zbigniew Boniek
No.	Date	Venue	Opponent	Score	Result	Competition
1	11 May 1976	Basel, Switzerland	Switzerland	1–2	1–2	Friendly
2	31 October 1976	Warsaw, Poland	Cyprus	3–0	5–0	1978 FIFA World Cup qualification
3	19 June 1977	São Paulo, Brazil	Brazil	1–3	1–3	Friendly
4	5 April 1978	Poznań, Poland	Greece	5–0	5–2	Friendly
5	12 April 1978	Łódź, Poland	Republic of Ireland	1–0	3–0	Friendly
6	10 June 1978	Rosario, Argentina	Mexico	1–0	3–1	1978 FIFA World Cup
7	10 June 1978	Rosario, Argentina	Mexico	3–1	3–1	1978 FIFA World Cup
8	15 November 1978	Wrocław, Poland	Switzerland	1–0	2–0	UEFA Euro 1980 qualifying
9	18 April 1979	Leipzig, East Germany	East Germany	1–0	1–2	UEFA Euro 1980 qualifying
10	2 May 1979	Chorzów, Poland	Netherlands	1–0	2–0	UEFA Euro 1980 qualifying
11	29 August 1979	Warsaw, Poland	Romania	3–0	3–0	Friendly
12	13 May 1980	Frankfurt, West Germany	West Germany	1–1	1–3	Friendly
13	28 May 1980	Poznań, Poland	Scotland	1–0	1–0	Friendly
14	28 October 1981	Buenos Aires, Argentina	Argentina	2–1	2–1	Friendly
15	15 November 1981	Wrocław, Poland	Malta	6–0	6–0	1982 FIFA World Cup qualification
16	18 November 1981	Łódź, Poland	Spain	2–1	2–3	Friendly
17	22 June 1982	A Coruña, Spain	Peru	3–0	5–1	1982 FIFA World Cup
18	28 June 1982	Barcelona, Spain	Belgium	1–0	3–0	1982 FIFA World Cup
19	28 June 1982	Barcelona, Spain	Belgium	2–0	3–0	1982 FIFA World Cup
20	28 June 1982	Barcelona, Spain	Belgium	3–0	3–0	1982 FIFA World Cup
21	22 May 1983	Chorzów, Poland	Soviet Union	1–0	1–1	UEFA Euro 1984 qualifying
22	27 March 1984	Zürich, Switzerland	Switzerland	1–0	1–1	Friendly
23	19 May 1985	Athens, Greece	Greece	3–1	4–1	1986 FIFA World Cup qualification
24	30 May 1985	Tirana, Albania	Albania	1–0	1–0	1986 FIFA World Cup qualification

== Honours ==
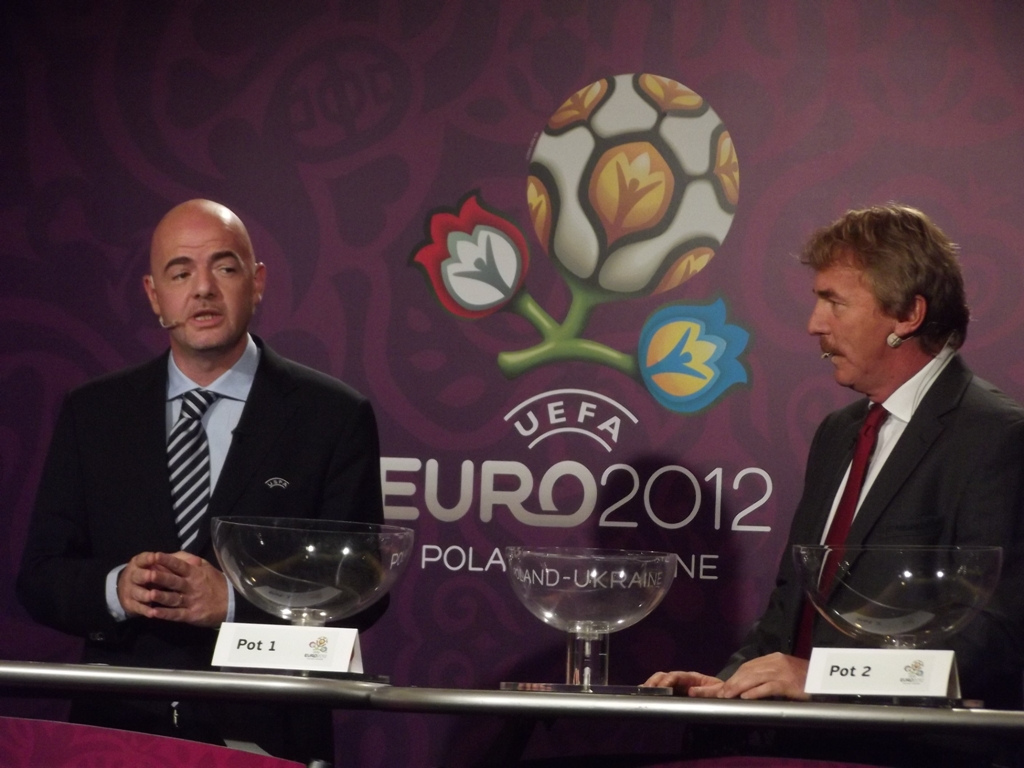
Boniek (right) in 2011.

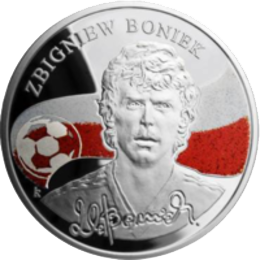
Boniek depicted on an Armenian commemorative coin in 2009.

Widzew Łódź

- Ekstraklasa: 1980–81, 1981–82

Juventus

- Serie A: 1983–84
- Coppa Italia: 1982–83
- European Cup: 1984–85
- European Super Cup: 1984
- European Cup Winners' Cup: 1983–84

Roma

- Coppa Italia: 1985–86

Poland

- FIFA World Cup third place: 1982

Individual

- Polish Newcomer of the Year: 1976
- Piłka Nożna Polish Footballer of the Year: 1978, 1982
- Ballon d'Or third place: 1982
- FIFA World Cup All-star Team: 1982
- ADN Eastern European Footballer of the Season: 1982
- FIFA 100: 2004
- Golden Foot Legends Award: 2009
- FAI International Football Awards – International Personality: 2012
- Italian Football Hall of Fame: 2019
- Polish Football Association National Team of the Century: 1919–2019

Orders

- Boniek was awarded the Knight's Cross of the Order of Polonia Restituta: 1982 Krzyż Kawalerski Orderu Odrodzenia Polski
- Boniek is a 3rd class knight of Order of Merit of the Italian Republic: 1997 Commendatore Ordine al Merito della Repubblica Italiana

== See also ==
- List of FIFA World Cup top goalscorers

== Notes ==
Sporting positions
Preceded by Grzegorz Lato	President of Polish Football Association; 26 October 2012 – 17 August 2021	Succeeded by Cezary Kulesza
