= 1986–87 SSC Napoli season =

Napoli
1986-87 season
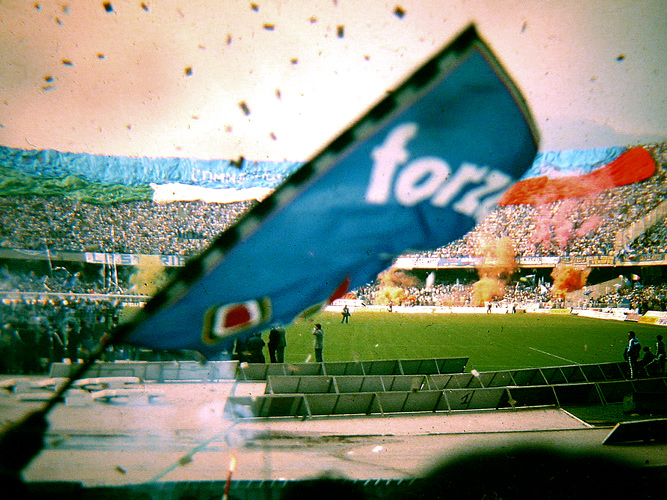
- Owner: Corrado Ferlaino
- President: Corrado Ferlaino
- Head coach: Ottavio Bianchi
- Stadium: San Paolo
- Serie A: 1st (In 1987–88 European Cup)
- Coppa Italia: Winners
- UEFA Cup: First round
- Top goalscorer: League: Diego Maradona (10); All: Diego Maradona (17)
Home colours	Away colours	Third colours

SSC Napoli won its first Serie A title with recently crowned World Cup winner Diego Maradona as their most influential player. Central defender Ciro Ferrara got his breakthrough, helping the team win the trophy. The two new signings Andrea Carnevale and Fernando De Napoli also proved crucial in the title-winning campaign, which sparked off fanatical celebrations in Naples.

== Squad ==
Note: Flags indicate national team as defined under FIFA eligibility rules; some limited exceptions apply. Players may hold more than one non-FIFA nationality.

Pos.	Nation	Player
GK	ITA	Claudio Garella
GK	ITA	Raffaele Di Fusco
DF	ITA	Giuseppe Bruscolotti
DF	ITA	Ciro Ferrara
DF	ITA	Moreno Ferrario
DF	ITA	Alessandro Renica
DF	ITA	Giuseppe Volpecina
DF	ITA	Tebaldo Bigliardi
DF	ITA	Massimo Filardi
DF	ITA	Antonio Carannante
DF	ITA	Raimondo Marino

Pos.	Nation	Player
DF	ITA	Luciano Sola
MF	ITA	Salvatore Bagni
MF	ITA	Fernando De Napoli
MF	ITA	Francesco Romano
MF	ITA	Costanzo Celestini
MF	ITA	Ciro Muro
MF	ITA	Luigi Caffarelli
FW	ITA	Bruno Giordano
FW	ARG	Diego Maradona
FW	ITA	Andrea Carnevale
FW	ITA	Pietro Puzone

=== Transfers ===
In
Pos.	Name	from	Type
FW	Andrea Carnevale	Udinese Calcio	
MF	Fernando De Napoli	Avellino	
MF	Ciro Muro	Pisa	
MF	Luciano Sola	A.S. Bari	
GK	Raffaele Di Fusco	Catanzaro	loan ended
DF	Giuseppe Volpecina	Pisa	loan ended

Out
Pos.	Name	To	Type
FW	Daniel Bertoni	Udinese Calcio	
MF	Ruben Buriani	SPAL	
MF	Massimiliano Favo	Salernitana	
MF	Eraldo Pecci	Bologna F.C.	
FW	Domenico Penzo	Trento	
FW	Francesco Baiano	Empoli F.C.	loan

==== Winter ====
In
Pos.	Name	from	Type
MF	Francesco Romano	Triestina	

Out
Pos.	Name	to	Type
DF	Raimondo Marino	S.S. Lazio	

== Competitions ==
=== Serie A ===
==== League table ====
Pos	Team	Pld	W	D	L	GF	GA	GD	Pts	Qualification or relegation
1	Napoli (C)	30	15	12	3	41	21	+20	42	Qualification to European Cup
2	Juventus	30	14	11	5	42	27	+15	39	Qualification to UEFA Cup
3	Inter Milan	30	15	8	7	32	17	+15	38	Qualification to UEFA Cup
4	Hellas Verona	30	12	12	6	36	25	+11	36	Qualification to UEFA Cup
5	Milan (Note: Milan won the UEFA Cup qualification match against Sampdoria 1–0, thus qualifying for the 1987–88 UEFA Cup.)	30	13	9	8	31	21	+10	35	Qualification to UEFA Cup

Source: 1986–87 Serie A, RSSSF.com
Rules for classification: 1) Points; 2) Head-to-head points; 3) Head-to-head goal difference; 4) Goal difference; 5) Goals scored; 6) Draw. (Note: Head-to-head record is used only after all the matches between the teams in question have been played).
(C) Champions

==== Position by round ====
Round	1	2	3	4	5	6	7	8	9	10	11	12	13	14	15	16	17	18	19	20	21	22	23	24	25	26	27	28	29	30
Ground	A	H	A	H	A	H	A	H	A	H	H	A	H	A	H	H	A	H	A	H	A	H	A	H	A	A	H	A	H	A
Result	W	D	D	W	W	D	W	D	W	W	D	D	W	L	W	W	W	W	W	D	W	D	L	W	D	L	W	D	D	D
Position	1	3	2	2	1	2	1	1	1	1	1	1	1	1	1	1	1	1	1	1	1	1	1	1	1	1	1	1	1	1

Source: Competitive matches
A = Away; H = Home; W = Win; D = Draw; L = Loss; = 1987–88 European Cup; = 1987–88 UEFA Cup

==== Matches ====
14 September 1986 1	Brescia	0–1	Napoli	Brescia
		Report	Maradona 41'	Stadium: Mario Rigamonti

21 September 1986 2	Napoli	1–1	Udinese	Naples
	De Napoli 29'	Report	Graziani 49'	Stadium: San Paolo

28 September 1986 3	Avellino	0–0	Napoli	Avellino
		Report		Stadium: Partenio

5 October 1986 4	Napoli	3–1	Torino	Naples
	Bagni 15'; Ferrara 60'; Giordano 76'	Report	Sabato 10'	Stadium: San Paolo

12 October 1986 5	Sampdoria	1–2	Napoli	Genoa
	Vialli 59' (pen.)	Report	Caffarelli 8'; Maradona 65' (pen.)	Stadium: Luigi Ferraris

19 October 1986 6	Napoli	2–2	Atalanta	Naples
	Volpecina 20'; Maradona 65' (pen.)	Report	Cantarutti 30'; Incocciati 80'	Stadium: San Paolo

26 October 1986 7	Roma	0–1	Napoli	Rome
		Report	Maradona 46'	Stadium: Olimpico

2 November 1986 8	Napoli	0–0	Inter	Naples
		Report		Stadium: San Paolo

9 November 1986 9	Juventus	1–3	Napoli	Turin
	M. Laudrup 50'	Report	Ferrario 73'; Giordano 74'; Volpecina 90'	Stadium: Comunale

23 November 1986 10	Napoli	4–0	Empoli	Naples
	Maradona 26'; Carnevale 46', 67'; Bagni 79'	Report		Stadium: San Paolo

30 November 1986 11	Napoli	0–0	Verona	Naples
		Report		Stadium: San Paolo

14 December 1986 12	Milan	0–0	Napoli	Milan
		Report		Stadium: San Siro

21 December 1986 13	Napoli	2–1	Como	Naples
	Caffarelli 17', 38'	Report	Brusculotti 89' (o.g.)	Stadium: San Paolo

4 January 1987 14	Fiorentina	3–1	Napoli	Florence
	Díaz 6'; Antognoni 25'; Monelli 89'	Report	Maradona 50'	Stadium: Comunale

11 January 1987 15	Napoli	3–0	Ascoli	Naples
	Muro 58'; Romano 67'; Bagni 86'	Report		Stadium: San Paolo

18 January 1987 16	Napoli	2–1	Brescia	Naples
	Ferrara 14'; Giordano 64' (pen.)	Report	Branco 55'	Stadium: San Paolo

1 February 1987 17	Udinese	0–3	Napoli	Udine
		Report	Maradona 28' (pen.) 42'; De Napoli 77'	Stadium: Friuli

8 February 1987 18	Napoli	3–0	Avellino	Naples
	Bagni 53'; Carnevale 68'; Carnevale 78'	Report		Stadium: San Paolo

22 February 1987 19	Torino	0–1	Napoli	Turin
		Report	Giordano 84'	Stadium: Comunale

1 March 1987 20	Napoli	1–1	Sampdoria	Naples
	Maradona 37'	Report	Lorenzo 31'	Stadium: San Paolo

8 March 1987 21	Atalanta	0–1	Napoli	Bergamo
		Report	Giordano 12'	Stadium: Comunale

15 March 1987 22	Napoli	0–0	Roma	Naples
		Report		Stadium: San Paolo

22 March 1987 23	Inter	1–0	Napoli	Milan
	Bergomi 85'	Report		Stadium: San Siro

29 March 1987 24	Napoli	2–1	Juventus	Naples
	Renica 14'; Romano 58'	Report	Serena 50'	Stadium: San Paolo

5 April 1987 25	Empoli	0–0	Napoli	Empoli
		Report		Stadium: Carlo Castellani

12 April 1987 26	Verona	3–0	Napoli	Verona
	Pacione 21'; Renica 32' (o.g.); Elkjær 39'	Report		Stadium: Marcantonio Bentegodio

26 April 1987 27	Napoli	2–1	Milan	Naples
	Carnevale 33'; Maradona 43'	Report	Virdis 79'	Stadium: San Paolo

3 May 1987 28	Como	1–1	Napoli	Como
	Giunta 63'	Report	Carnevale 76'	Stadium: Giuseppe Sinigaglia

10 May 1987 29	Napoli	1–1	Fiorentina	Naples
	Carnevale 29'	Report	Baggio 39'	Stadium: San Paolo

17 May 1987 30	Ascoli	1–1	Napoli	Ascoli Piceno
	Barbuti 54'	Report	Carnevale 10'	Stadium: Cino e Lillo Del Duca

=== Coppa Italia ===
First Round - Group 5

24 August 1986 1	SPAL	0–2	Napoli	Ferrara
20:30 CEST			43' Bagni; 68' Maradona	Stadium: Paolo Mazza

27 August 1986 2	Lazio	0–2	Napoli	Rome
20:30 CEST			Carnevale 26'; Maradona 36'	Stadium: Olimpico

31 August 1986 3	Taranto	0–1	Napoli	Taranto
20:30 CEST			De Napoli 73'	Stadium: Erasmo Iacovone

3 September 1986 4	Napoli	2–1	Vicenza	Naples
20:30 CEST	Muro 54'; Giordano 73'		82' Rondon	Stadium: San Paolo

7 September 1986 5	Napoli	3–1	Cesena	Naples
20:30 CEST	Carnevale 24'; Maradona 53'; Bagni 74'		9' Simonini	Stadium: San Paolo

Eightfinals

25 February 1987	Napoli	3–0	Brescia	Naples
20:30 CET	Maradona 16'; Muro 56'; Giordano 72'			Stadium: San Paolo

8 April 1987	Brescia	0–3	Napoli	Brescia
20:30 CEST			Carnevale 47'; Giordano 69'; Giordano 76'	Stadium: Mario Rigamonti

Quarterfinals

29 April 1987	Napoli	3–0	Bologna	Naples
20:30 CEST	Giordano 45'; Carnevale 61'; Maradona 84'			Stadium: San Paolo

6 May 1987	Bologna	2–4	Napoli	Bologna
20:30 CEST	Marocchi 40'; Marronaro 86'		55' Caffarelli; 60', 88' Giordano; 70' (pen.) Maradona	Stadium: Renato Dall'Ara

Semifinals

27 May 1987	Cagliari	0–1	Napoli	Cagliari
20:30 CEST			Maradona 79'	Stadium: Sant'Elia

3 June 1987	Napoli	4–1	Cagliari	Naples
20:30 CEST	Carnevale 22'; Giordano 24', 42'; Muro 68'		36' (o.g.) Romano	Stadium: San Paolo

Final

7 June 1987	Napoli	3–0	Atalanta	Naples
20:30 CEST	Renica 67'; Muro 71'; Bagni 77'			Stadium: San Paolo

13 June 1987	Atalanta	0–1	Napoli	Bergamo
20:30 CEST			Giordano 86'	Stadium: Comunale

=== UEFA Cup ===
First Round

17 September 1986	Napoli	1–0	(France) Toulouse FC	Naples
20:30 CEST	Carnevale 55'	Report		Stadium: San Paolo; Referee: (Germany) Tritschler

1 October 1986	(France) Toulouse FC	1–0 (4–3 p)	Napoli	Toulouse
20:00 CEST	Stopyra 15'	Report		Stadium: Stade de Toulouse; Referee: (Sweden) Fredriksson
	Penalties
	Stopyra (penalty missed); Márcico (penalty scored); Durand (penalty scored); Marx (penalty scored); Tarantini (penalty scored)		(penalty scored) Giordano; (penalty scored) Ferrario; (penalty scored) Renica; (penalty missed) Bagni; (penalty missed) Maradona

== Statistics ==
=== Players statistics ===
No.	Pos	Nat	Player	Total		1986–87 Serie A		Coppa Italia		1986–87 UEFA Cup	
No.	Pos	Nat	Player	Apps	Goals	Apps	Goals	Apps	Goals	Apps	Goals
	GK	(Italy) ITA	Garella	40	-24	29	-20	9	-3	2	-1
	DF	(Italy) ITA	Ferrara	38	2	26+2	2	8	0	2	0
	DF	(Italy) ITA	Renica	40	2	29	1	9	1	2	0
	DF	(Italy) ITA	Ferrario	43	1	29	1	12	0	2	0
	DF	(Italy) ITA	Bruscolotti	39	0	21+4	0	12	0	2	0
	MF	(Italy) ITA	Bagni	40	7	28	4	10	3	2	0
	MF	(Italy) ITA	De Napoli	40	3	28	2	10	1	2	0
	MF	(Italy) ITA	Romano	31	2	24	2	7	0	0	0
	FW	(Italy) ITA	Carnevale	42	14	18+9	8	13	5	2	1
	FW	(Italy) ITA	Giordano	41	15	25+1	5	13	10	2	0
	FW	(Argentina) ARG	Maradona	41	17	29	10	10	7	2	0
	GK	(Italy) ITA	Di Fusco	5	-3	1	-1	4	-2	0	0
	MF	(Italy) ITA	Caffarelli	34	4	16+5	3	12	1	1	0
	DF	(Italy) ITA	Volpecina	35	2	15+10	2	8	0	2	0
	MF	(Italy) ITA	Muro	26	5	10+1	1	13	4	2	0
	DF	(Italy) ITA	Sola	23	0	9+7	0	7	0	0	0
	DF	(Italy) ITA	Marino	10	0	2+2	0	5	0	1	0
	DF	(Italy) ITA	Bigliardi	10	0	0+3	0	7	0	0	0
	FW	(Italy) ITA	Puzone	0	0	0	0				
	FW	(Italy) ITA	Micciola	0	0	0	0				
	FW	(Italy) ITA	Castellone	0	0	0	0				

- Source: http://calcio-seriea.net/presenze/1986/933/

== Sources ==
- RSSSF - Italy 1986/87
