= List of SSC Napoli players =

Below is a list of notable footballers who have played for Napoli. Generally, this means players have played at least 50 matches or scored 10 goals for the club, but some players who have played fewer matches are included, if they have had success at other clubs or appeared at least once in the national team. Raphael is their star player.

== List of players ==
Players are listed according to the date of their first-team debut for the club. Appearances and goals are for the first team, including appearances as substitutes, correct as of 1 November 2026

Player	Nationality	Position	Napoli career	Appearances	Goals
Ernesto Ghisi	Italy; Libya	FW	1926–1930	39	13
Domenico Gariglio	Italy	FW	1926–1930	62	4
Roberto Di Martino	Italy	MF	1926–1931	100	0
Paulo Innocenti	Italy; Brazil	DF	1926–1937	213	6
Attila Sallustro	Italy; Paraguay	FW	1926–1937	266	108
Gondrano Innocenti	Italy	MF	1927–1929	49	17
Adamo Roggia	Italy	MF	1928–1931	91	5
Camillo Fenili	Italy	FW/MF	1928–1931	51	5
Carlo Buscaglia	Italy	MF/FW	1928–1938	270	41
Marcello Mihalich	Italy; Croatia	MF	1929–1932	94	32
Giovanni Vincenzi	Italy	DF	1929–1935	172	0
Antonio Vojak	Italy; Croatia	FW/MF	1929–1935	196	103
Giuseppe Cavanna	Italy	GK	1929–1936	156	0
Mariano Tansini	Italy	FW/MF	1930–1932	54	11
Ettore Fontana	Italy	DF	1930–1933	49	0
Enrico Colombari	Italy	MF	1930–1937	219	6
Luigi Castello	Italy	DF	1930–1940	182	0
Carlos Volante	Argentina	MF	1931–1932	26	0
Oliviero Vojak	Italy; Croatia	FW	1931–1932	15	6
Oreste Benatti	Italy	MF	1931–1934	62	6
Valerio Gravisi	Italy	MF	1932–1935	39	12
Pietro Ferraris	Italy	FW	1932–1936	85	14
Goliardo Gelardi	Brazil	MF	1933–1934	1	0
Enrico Rivolta	Italy	FW/MF	1933–1936	90	2
Gino Rossetti	Italy	FW/MF	1933–1937	128	29
Giovanni Venditto	Italy	FW/MF	1933–1943	188	34
Guillermo Stábile	Argentina	FW	1934–1935	20	3
Arnaldo Sentimenti	Italy	GK	1934–1943; 1945–1948	235	0
Giovanni Busoni	Italy	FW	1935–1936	30	12
Antonio Ferrara	Argentina; Italy	MF	1935–1937	40	7
Vittorio Mosele	Italy	GK	1935–1938	58	0
Giuseppe Fenoglio	Italy	DF	1935–1940	123	0
Silverio Tricoli	Italy	MF	1935–1943	90	0
Carlo Biagi	Italy	MF	1936–1940	94	17
Nicolás Riccardi	Uruguay	DF	1937–1939	58	1
Filippo Prato	Italy	MF	1937–1940	82	8
Germano Mian	Italy	FW/MF	1937–1940	77	14
Nereo Rocco	Italy	MF/FW	1937–1940	55	8
Giuseppe Gerbi	Italy	FW	1937–1940	29	9
Mario Pretto	Italy	DF	1937–1949	229	1
Achille Piccini	Italy	DF	1938–1939	25	1
Alfonso Negro	Italy; United States	FW	1938–1941	27	2
Aldo Fabbro	Italy	MF	1938–1943	108	8
Italo Romagnoli	Italy	MF/DF	1938–1940; 1946–1947	68	9
Bruno Gramaglia	Italy	MF/DF	1938–1943; 1949–1955	275	4
Luigi Rosellini	Italy	MF	1939–1941	52	18
Carlo Alberto Quario	Italy	FW	1939–1941	55	19
Luigi Cassano	Italy	DF	1939–1942	49	0
Evaristo Barrera	Argentina	FW	1940–1942	49	12
Giuseppe Cadregari	Italy	FW	1940–1943	60	15
Luigi Milano	Italy	MF	1940–1943; 1945–1946	94	2
Umberto Busani	Italy	FW/MF	1940–1948	174	46
Bruno Berra	Italy	DF	1941–1947	119	0
Andrea Verrina	Italy	MF	1941–1944; 1945–1948	144	18
Ferdinando Pastore	Italy	MF	1941–1942; 1945–1950	88	1
Egidio Di Costanzo	Italy	MF	1941–1943; 1945–1951	153	7
Vinicio Viani	Italy	FW	1942–1943	32	17
Luigi Ganelli	Italy	MF	1942–1943; 1946–1948	49	2
Raffaele Sansone	Italy; Uruguay	MF	1945–1946	4	0
Riza Lushta	Kosovo; Albania	FW	1945–1946	27	6
Michele Andreolo	Italy; Uruguay	MF	1945–1948	93	11
Mario Rosi	Italy	MF	1945–1949	149	3
Carlo Barbieri	Italy	FW/MF	1945–1949	108	31
Dante Di Benedetti	Italy	FW	1946–1948	47	20
Ferruccio Santamaria	Italy	MF	1946–1949	64	14
Jone Spartano	Italy	MF	1946–1949	54	3
Sergio Chellini	Italy	GK	1946–1950	121	0
Ottavio Morgia	Italy	FW	1946–1947; 1949–1950	31	7
Roberto La Paz	Uruguay	FW	1947–1949	33	6
Naim Krieziu	Albania	FW/MF	1947–1952	168	40
Petar Manola	Yugoslavia; Bosnia and Herzegovina	FW/MF	1948–1949	14	1
Felice Borel	Italy	FW	1948–1949	1	0
Renato Brighenti	Italy	FW	1948–1949	27	8
Eto Soldani	Italy	DF	1948–1951	87	5
Ivo Šuprina	Croatia; Yugoslavia	FW	1948–1951	54	21
Costantino De Andreis	Italy	FW	1949–1950	38	12
Paolo Todeschini	Italy	MF	1949–1952	94	14
Mario Astorri	Italy	FW	1949–1953	88	31
Alberto Delfrati	Italy	DF	1949–1954	127	0
Leandro Remondini	Italy	DF	1950–1951	28	5
Antonio Bacchetti	Italy	MF	1950–1952	30	10
Giuseppe Casari	Italy	GK	1950–1953	107	0
Silvio Formentin	Italy	MF	1950–1954	103	23
Farnese Masoni	Italy	FW/MF	1950–1953; 1954–1955	25	9
Amedeo Amadei	Italy	FW	1950–1956	171	47
Giorgio Granata	Italy	MF	1950–1957	169	4
Dionisio Arce	Paraguay	FW	1951–1952	11	2
István Mike Mayer	Hungary	FW	1951–1952	21	8
Jeno Vinyei	Czechoslovakia; Hungary	DF	1951–1955	124	5
Giulio Castelli	Italy	DF/MF	1951–1956	121	7
Luciano Comaschi	Italy	DF	1951–1960	251	4
Hasse Jeppson	Sweden	FW	1952–1956	112	51
Giancarlo Vitali	Italy	FW/MF	1952–1957	136	41
Bruno Pesaola	Italy; Argentina	FW/MF	1952–1960	253	27
Giovanni Ciccarelli	Italy	MF/FW	1953–1957	93	10
Ottavio Bugatti	Italy	GK	1953–1961	261	0
Armando Tre Re	Italy	DF	1954–1956	66	0
Rodolfo Beltrandi	Italy	MF	1954–1960	171	13
Celso Posio	Italy	MF/DF	1954–1961	208	13
Luís Vinício	Brazil	FW	1955–1960	155	70
Elia Greco	Italy	DF	1955–1962	194	1
Dolo Mistone	Italy	DF	1955–1966	159	1
Luigi Brugola	Italy	FW/MF	1956–1959	65	10
Cesare Franchini	Italy	MF	1956–1960	69	3
Sergio Morin	Italy	MF	1956–1960	97	1
Carlo Novelli	Italy	FW/MF	1957–1959	40	9
Gino Bertucco	Italy	MF	1957–1961	69	8
Beniamino Di Giacomo	Italy	FW	1957–1961	127	37
Emanuele Del Vecchio	Brazil	FW	1957–1961	71	28
Alessandro Vitali	Italy	MF	1958–1960	35	8
Gianfelice Schiavone	Italy	DF	1959–1962	64	1
Pacifico Cuman	Italy	GK	1959–1969	56	0
Guido Gratton	Italy	MF	1960–1961	19	2
Gino Pivatelli	Italy	FW	1960–1961	22	3
Juan Carlos Tacchi	Argentina	FW	1960–1966	127	19
Antonio Girardo	Italy	MF/DF	1960–1968	224	6
Giovanni Molino	Italy	DF	1961–1963	68	0
Ugo Tomeazzi	Italy	MF/FW	1961–1963	40	2
Amos Mariani	Italy	FW/MF	1961–1963	39	8
Giovanni Fanello	Italy	FW	1961–1963	87	19
Walter Pontel	Italy	GK	1961–1964	94	0
Rosario Rivellino	Italy	MF	1961–1964	43	0
Glauco Gilardoni	Italy	FW	1961–1965	57	15
Achille Fraschini	Italy	MF	1961–1965	105	23
Gianni Corelli	Italy	FW/MF	1961–1965	120	26
Mauro Gatti	Italy	DF	1961–1966	136	6
Pierluigi Ronzon	Italy	DF/MF	1961–1967	227	15
Vincenzo Montefusco	Italy	MF	1961–1970; 1971–1972; 1973–1974; 1975–1977	214	13
Humberto Rosa	Italy; Argentina	MF	1962–1964	48	7
Cané	Brazil	FW	1962–1969; 1972–1975	254	70
Antonio Juliano	Italy	MF	1962–1978	505	38
Bruno Garzena	Italy	DF	1963–1964	32	0
Giovanni Bolzoni	Italy	MF	1963–1966	45	9
Flavio Emoli	Italy	MF	1963–1966	75	0
Pietro Adorni	Italy	DF	1964–1966	49	2
Claudio Bandoni	Italy	GK	1964–1967	113	0
Gastone Bean	Italy	FW	1964–1967	55	14
Dino Panzanato	Italy	DF	1964–1973	262	2
Mario Zurlini	Italy	DF	1964–1974	254	4
Amedeo Stenti	Italy	DF	1965–1969	75	0
Omar Sívori	Italy; Argentina	FW/MF	1965–1969	76	16
Stelio Nardin	Italy	DF	1965–1971	169	0
José Altafini	Italy; Brazil	FW	1965–1972	234	97
Alberto Orlando	Italy	FW	1966–1968	74	14
Romano Micelli	Italy	DF	1966–1969	40	0
Ottavio Bianchi	Italy	MF	1966–1971	150	20
Paolo Barison	Italy	FW/MF	1967–1970	82	16
Dino Zoff	Italy	GK	1967–1972	190	0
Luigi Pogliana	Italy	DF	1967–1977	263	8
Aristide Guarneri	Italy	DF	1968–1969	27	0
Claudio Sala	Italy	MF	1968–1969	33	3
Harald Nielsen	Denmark	FW	1968–1969	19	5
Luciano Monticolo	Italy	DF	1969–1971	63	2
Kurt Hamrin	Sweden	FW	1969–1971	34	5
Pierpaolo Manservisi	Italy	FW/MF	1969–1970; 1971–1972	60	7
Giovanni Improta	Italy	MF	1969–1973; 1979–1980	181	22
Angelo Sormani	Italy; Brazil	FW	1970–1972	69	13
Carlo Ripari	Italy	DF	1970–1972; 1973–1974	66	1
Pietro Carmignani	Italy	GK	1972–1977	194	0
Giovanni Vavassori	Italy	DF	1972–1977	121	1
Salvatore Esposito	Italy	MF	1972–1977	176	8
Oscar Damiani	Italy	FW/MF	1972–1973; 1979–1982	128	26
Giuseppe Bruscolotti	Italy	DF	1972–1988	511	11
Sergio Clerici	Brazil	FW	1973–1975	66	32
Spartaco Landini	Italy	DF	1973–1976	33	0
Giorgio Braglia	Italy	FW	1973–1976	110	35
Andrea Orlandini	Italy	MF	1973–1977	156	8
Tarcisio Burgnich	Italy	DF	1974–1977	118	1
Giuseppe Massa	Italy	FW/MF	1974–1978	150	36
Antonio La Palma	Italy	DF	1974–1978	116	5
Giuseppe Savoldi	Italy	FW	1975–1979	165	77
Luciano Chiarugi	Italy	FW/MF	1976–1978	48	10
Sauro Catellani	Italy	DF	1976–1979	70	0
Walter Speggiorin	Italy	FW	1976–1977; 1979–1981	79	13
Claudio Vinazzani	Italy	MF	1976–1983	253	5
Livio Pin	Italy	MF	1977–1979	58	7
Antonio Capone	Italy	FW	1977–1981; 1982–1983	87	13
Gaetano Musella	Italy	FW	1977–1978; 1979–1982	85	12
Moreno Ferrario	Italy	DF	1977–1988	396	11
Domenico Caso	Italy	MF/FW	1978–1979	24	1
Claudio Pellegrini	Italy	FW	1978–1979; 1980–1984	175	41
Attilio Tesser	Italy	DF	1978–1980	50	3
Vittorio Caporale	Italy	DF	1978–1980	55	0
Roberto Filippi	Italy	MF	1978–1980	70	3
Luciano Castellini	Italy	GK	1978–1985	258	0
Mauro Bellugi	Italy	DF	1979–1980	34	0
Mario Guidetti	Italy	MF	1979–1982	96	10
Raimondo Marino	Italy	DF	1979–1983; 1984–1986	143	4
Costanzo Celestini	Italy	MF	1979–1981; 1982–1987	145	2
Luciano Marangon	Italy	DF	1980–1981	29	0
Ruud Krol	Netherlands	DF	1980–1984	125	1
Filippo Citterio	Italy	DF	1981–1983	63	2
Antonio Criscimanni	Italy	MF	1981–1983	78	5
Massimo Palanca	Italy	FW	1981–1982; 1983–1984	50	2
Antonio Carannante	Italy	DF	1981–1987; 1988–1989	107	3
Ramon Diaz	Argentina	FW	1982–1983	38	8
Paolo Dal Fiume	Italy	MF	1982–1985	101	10
Dirceu	Brazil	MF	1983–1984	35	6
Gianni De Rosa	Italy	FW	1983–1984	33	8
Luigi Caffarelli	Italy	MF/FW	1983–1987	129	11
Daniel Bertoni	Argentina	FW/MF	1984–1986	63	18
Salvatore Bagni	Italy	MF	1984–1988	135	17
Francesco Baiano	Italy	FW	1984–1986; 1987–1988	12	0
Diego Maradona	Argentina	FW	1984–1991	259	115
Ciro Ferrara	Italy	DF	1984–1994	322	15
Eraldo Pecci	Italy	MF	1985–1986	29	1
Ruben Buriani	Italy	MF	1985–1986	9	0
Claudio Garella	Italy	GK	1985–1988	115	0
Bruno Giordano	Italy	FW	1985–1988	109	37
Alessandro Renica	Italy	DF	1985–1991	194	17
Massimo Filardi	Italy	DF	1985–1989; 1991–1992	80	0
Francesco Romano	Italy	MF	1986–1989	91	7
Fernando De Napoli	Italy	MF	1986–1992	242	9
Giuseppe Taglialatela	Italy	GK	1986–1988; 1990–1991; 1993–1999	203	0
Tebaldo Bigliardi	Italy	DF	1986–1990	59	0
Andrea Carnevale	Italy	FW	1986–1990	154	47
Careca	Brazil	FW	1987–1993	221	95
Giovanni Francini	Italy	DF	1987–1994	250	17
Giuliano Giuliani	Italy	GK	1988–1990	98	0
Luca Fusi	Italy	MF/DF	1988–1990	96	2
Alemão	Brazil	MF	1988–1992	133	14
Massimo Crippa	Italy	MF	1988–1993	206	11
Giancarlo Corradini	Italy	DF	1988–1994	230	3
Marco Baroni	Italy	DF	1989–1991	77	4
Massimo Mauro	Italy	MF	1989–1993	90	4
Gianfranco Zola	Italy	FW/MF	1989–1993	136	36
Massimo Tarantino	Italy	DF	1989; 1991–1996	118	0
Luca Altomare	Italy	MF	1989–1991; 1992–1993; 1994–1999	116	4
Giorgio Venturin	Italy	MF	1990–1991	41	0
Giuseppe Incocciati	Italy	FW	1990–1991	32	11
Andrea Silenzi	Italy	FW	1990–1992	50	9
Giovanni Galli	Italy	GK	1990–1993	123	0
Laurent Blanc	France	DF	1991–1992	34	6
Michele Padovano	Italy	FW	1991–1992	31	7
Sebastiano Nela	Italy	DF	1992–1994	38	0
Jonas Thern	Sweden	MF	1992–1994	55	1
Daniel Fonseca	Uruguay	FW	1992–1994	69	39
Fabio Cannavaro	Italy	DF	1992–1995	68	1
Fausto Pari	Italy	MF/DF	1992–1996	100	1
Roberto Policano	Italy	DF/MF	1992–1997	113	15
Eugenio Corini	Italy	MF	1993–1994	22	0
Paolo Di Canio	Italy	FW	1993–1994	27	5
Renato Buso	Italy	MF/FW	1993–1996	108	12
Roberto Bordin	Italy; Libya	MF/DF	1993–1997	122	0
Fabio Pecchia	Italy	MF	1993–1997; 2000–2001	172	24
Freddy Rincón	Colombia	MF	1994–1995	38	7
Benito Carbone	Italy	FW/MF	1994–1995	40	11
Massimo Agostini	Italy	FW	1994–1996	74	17
André Cruz	Brazil	DF	1994–1997	98	14
Alain Boghossian	France	MF	1994–1997	69	5
Raffaele Longo	Italy	MF	1994–1998	65	0
Francesco Colonnese	Italy	DF	1995–1997	54	0
Roberto Ayala	Argentina	DF	1995–1998	96	1
Francesco Baldini	Italy	DF	1995–2001; 2002–2003	195	2
Beto	Brazil	MF	1996–1997	26	5
Nicola Caccia	Italy	FW	1996–1997	40	7
Caio	Brazil	FW	1996–1997	24	1
Alfredo Aglietti	Italy	FW	1996–1997	34	10
Bertrand Crasson	Belgium	DF	1996–1998	51	0
Massimiliano Esposito	Italy	MF	1996–1997; 1998–1999	55	6
Gennaro Scarlato	Italy	DF	1996–1998; 1999–2000; 2004–2005	78	4
Francesco Turrini	Italy	MF/FW	1996–2000	126	20
Reynald Pedros	France	MF	1997	4	0
Giuseppe Giannini	Italy	MF	1997	5	1
William Prunier	France	DF	1997–1998	4	0
Aljoša Asanović	Croatia; Yugoslavia	MF	1997–1998	15	0
Igor Protti	Italy	FW	1997–1998	31	6
José Luis Calderón	Argentina	FW	1997–1998	7	0
Raffaele Sergio	Italy	DF	1997–1999	17	0
Fabio Rossitto	Italy	MF	1997–1999	59	3
Claudio Bellucci	Italy	FW	1997–2001	101	28
Marco Zamboni	Italy	DF	1997–1998; 2003–2004	42	3
Igor Shalimov	Russia; Soviet Union	MF	1998–1999	20	2
Giovanni Lopez	Italy	DF	1998–2000	56	0
Cristiano Scapolo	Italy	MF	1998–2000	51	3
Steinar Nilsen	Norway	DF	1998–2002	59	1
Oscar Magoni	Italy	MF	1998–2002	127	6
Antonio Bocchetti	Italy	DF	1997–1998; 2000–2003	74	2
Emanuele Troise	Italy	DF	1998–2003	84	1
Nicola Mora	Italy	DF	1998–2000; 2004–2005	83	2
Massimo Oddo	Italy	DF	1999–2000	45	1
Stefan Schwoch	Italy	FW	1999–2000	66	32
Matuzalém	Brazil	MF	1999–2001	61	1
Roberto Stellone	Italy	FW	1999–2003	102	33
Antonino Asta	Italy	MF	2000	15	2
Luciano Galletti	Argentina	MF/FW	2000	11	2
Mauricio Pineda	Argentina	DF	2000–2001	22	0
Facundo Hernán Quiroga	Argentina	DF	2000–2001	28	0
Salvatore Fresi	Italy	DF	2000–2001	24	1
Nicola Amoruso	Italy	FW	2000–2001	32	10
Francesco Moriero	Italy	FW/MF	2000–2002	26	1
Claudio Husaín	Argentina	MF	2000–2001; 2002–2003	44	1
Marek Jankulovski	Czech Republic	MF/DF	2000–2002	53	9
Francesco Mancini	Italy	GK	2000–2003	87	0
Abdelilah Saber	Morocco	DF	2000–2004	52	0
José Luís Vidigal	Portugal; Angola	MF	2000–2004	91	8
Antonio Floro Flores	Italy	FW	2000–2004	68	3
David Sesa	Switzerland	FW/MF	2000–2004	82	6
Edmundo	Brazil	FW	2001	17	4
Amauri	Italy; Brazil	FW	2001	6	1
Mauro Bonomi	Italy	DF	2001–2004	102	3
Fábio César Montezine	Qatar; Brazil	MF	2001–2004	80	8
Marco Storari	Italy	GK	2002–2003	4	0
Carlos Pavon	Honduras	FW	2002–2003	14	0
Davide Dionigi	Italy	FW	2002–2004	64	27
Emanuele Manitta	Italy	GK	2003–2004	50	0
Daniele Portanova	Italy	DF	2003–2004	32	0
Massimo Carrera	Italy	DF	2003–2004	26	0
Mario Cvitanović	Croatia	DF	2003–2004	9	0
Vittorio Tosto	Italy	DF/MF	2003–2004	39	5
Dario Marcolin	Italy	MF	2003–2004	47	0
Nicola Zanini	Italy	MF	2003–2004	37	5
Massimiliano Vieri	Australia; Italy	FW	2003–2004	29	5
Gonzalo Martinez	Colombia	DF	2003; 2004	32	0
Cataldo Montesanto	Italy	MF	2003–2007	72	1
Francesco Montervino	Italy	MF	2003; 2004–2009	166	6
Marko Perović	Serbia; Yugoslavia	MF	2004	15	3
Karl Corneliusson	Sweden	MF/DF	2004–2005	11	0
Ignazio Abate	Italy	MF	2004–2005	33	2
Fabio Gatti	Italy	MF	2004–2006; 2006–2008	53	0
Roberto Sosa	Argentina	FW	2004–2008	131	30
Emanuele Calaiò	Italy	FW	2004–2008; 2013	136	44
Olivier Renard	Belgium	GK	2005	2	0
Ruben Maldonado	Paraguay	DF	2005–2008	74	2
Marco Capparella	Italy	MF/FW	2005–2008	63	6
Mirko Savini	Italy	DF	2005–2009	80	0
Nicolás Amodio	Uruguay	MF	2005–2007; 2008–2010	68	1
Piá	Brazil	FW	2005–2007; 2008–2010	101	23
Mariano Bogliacino	Uruguay	MF	2005–2010	158	20
Luigi Vitale	Italy	MF/DF	2005–2007; 2008–2009; 2010–2011	43	4
Gennaro Iezzo	Italy	GK	2005–2011	119	0
Gianluca Grava	Italy	DF	2005–2013	180	2
Ivano Trotta	Italy	MF	2006–2007	48	3
Cristian Bucchi	Italy	FW	2006–2007	34	11
György Garics	Austria; Hungary	DF	2006–2008	41	1
Maurizio Domizzi	Italy	DF	2006–2008	73	14
Samuele Dalla Bona	Italy	MF	2006–2009	43	5
Paolo Cannavaro	Italy	DF	1998–1999; 2006–2013	278	9
Marcelo Zalayeta	Uruguay	FW	2007–2009	56	12
Matteo Contini	Italy	DF	2007–2010	86	1
Manuele Blasi	Italy	MF	2007–2009; 2010–2011	73	0
Ezequiel Lavezzi	Argentina	FW	2007–2012	188	48
Walter Gargano	Uruguay	MF	2007–2012; 2014–2015	235	4
Marek Hamšík	Slovakia	MF	2007–2019	520	121
Germán Denis	Argentina	FW	2008–2010	72	15
Fabiano Santacroce	Italy; Brazil	DF	2008–2011	62	0
Michele Pazienza	Italy	MF	2008–2011	121	4
Leandro Rinaudo	Italy	DF	2008–2010; 2011; 2012–2013	44	3
Salvatore Aronica	Italy	DF	2008–2013	141	0
Christian Maggio	Italy	DF/MF	2008–2018	308	23
Luca Bucci	Italy	GK	2009	1	0
Jesús Dátolo	Argentina	MF	2009–2010	25	1
Luca Cigarini	Italy	MF	2009–2010	29	2
Erwin Hoffer	Austria	FW	2009–2010	11	1
Fabio Quagliarella	Italy	FW	2009–2010	37	11
Morgan De Sanctis	Italy	GK	2009–2013	175	0
Hugo Campagnaro	Argentina	DF	2009–2013	143	4
Juan Camilo Zúñiga	Colombia	DF/MF	2009–2016	162	4
Lorenzo Insigne	Italy	FW/MF	2009–2010; 2012–2022	434	122
Hassan Yebda	Algeria; France	MF	2010–2011	39	1
José Sosa	Argentina	MF	2010–2011	31	1
Cristiano Lucarelli	Italy	FW	2010–2012	14	1
Andrea Dossena	Italy	DF/MF	2010–2013	109	3
Edinson Cavani	Uruguay	FW	2010–2013	138	104
Víctor Ruiz	Spain	DF	2011	7	0
Mario Santana	Argentina	MF	2011	11	0
Giuseppe Mascara	Italy	FW	2011–2012	25	4
Federico Fernández	Argentina	DF	2011–2012; 2013–2014	64	2
Blerim Džemaili	Switzerland; North Macedonia	MF	2011–2014	109	18
Goran Pandev	North Macedonia	FW	2011–2014	124	22
Miguel Britos	Uruguay	DF	2011–2015	99	3
Gökhan Inler	Switzerland; Turkey	MF	2011–2015	166	13
Eduardo Vargas	Chile	FW	2012	28	3
Alessandro Gamberini	Italy	DF	2012–2013	30	1
Omar El Kaddouri	Morocco; Belgium	MF	2012–2013; 2015–2017	43	3
Bruno Uvini	Brazil	DF	2012; 2013–2014	2	0
Valon Behrami	Switzerland; Kosovo	MF	2012–2014	70	0
Giandomenico Mesto	Italy	DF/MF	2012–2015	52	1
Rolando	Portugal; Cape Verde	DF	2013	9	0
Pablo Armero	Colombia	DF/MF	2013	33	0
Pepe Reina	Spain	GK	2013–2014; 2015–2018	182	0
Anthony Réveillère	France	DF	2013–2014	18	0
Josip Radošević	Croatia	MF	2013–2015	10	0
Rafael Cabral	Brazil	GK	2013–2018	45	0
Raúl Albiol	Spain	DF	2013–2019	236	6
Dries Mertens	Belgium	FW/MF	2013–2022	397	148
José Callejón	Spain	FW/MF	2013–2020	349	82
Duván Zapata	Colombia	FW	2013–2015	53	15
Gonzalo Higuaín	Argentina; France	FW	2013–2016	146	91
Mariano Andújar	Argentina	GK	2014–2015	27	0
Faouzi Ghoulam	Algeria; France	DF	2014–2022	216	3
Kalidou Koulibaly	Senegal; France	DF	2014–2022	317	14
Henrique	Brazil	DF	2014–2016	38	2
David López	Spain	MF	2014–2016	79	3
Jorginho	Italy; Brazil	MF	2014–2018	160	6
Jonathan de Guzmán	Netherlands; Canada	MF	2014–2016	36	7
Michu	Spain	FW/MF	2014–2015	6	0
Gabriel	Brazil	GK	2015–2016	4	0
Ivan Strinić	Croatia	DF	2015–2017	39	0
Manolo Gabbiadini	Italy	FW	2015–2017	79	25
Vlad Chiricheș	Romania	DF	2015–2019	48	4
Elseid Hysaj	Albania	DF	2015–2021	223	1
Allan	Brazil	MF	2015–2020	212	11
Mirko Valdifiori	Italy	MF	2015–2016	16	0
Nathaniel Chalobah	England; Sierra Leone	MF	2015–2016	9	1
Piotr Zieliński	Poland	MF	2016–2024	364	51
Arkadiusz Milik	Poland	FW	2016–2021	122	48
Nikola Maksimović	Serbia	DF	2016–2017; 2018–2021	99	2
Emanuele Giaccherini	Italy	FW/MF	2016–2017	24	2
Amadou Diawara	Guinea	MF	2016–2019	74	2
Marko Rog	Croatia	MF	2016–2019	67	2
Lorenzo Tonelli	Italy	DF	2016–2018; 2019–2020	9	3
Leonardo Pavoletti	Italy	FW	2017	10	0
Adam Ounas	Algeria; France	FW/MF	2017–2019; 2021–2022	62	7
Mário Rui	Portugal	DF	2017–2025	227	3
Orestis Karnezis	Greece	GK	2018–2020	9	0
David Ospina	Colombia	GK	2018–2022	103	0
Simone Verdi	Italy	FW/MF	2018–2019	24	4
Fabián Ruiz	Spain	MF	2018–2022	166	22
Kévin Malcuit	France; Morocco	DF	2018–2021; 2021–2022	48	0
Alex Meret	Italy	GK	2018–	233	0
Amin Younes	Germany; Lebanon	FW/MF	2018–2020	27	4
Giovanni Di Lorenzo	Italy	DF	2019–	318	20
Kostas Manolas	Greece	DF	2019–2021	75	4
Eljif Elmas	North Macedonia; Turkey	MF	2019–2024 / 2025-	233	20
Hirving Lozano	Mexico	FW/MF	2019–2023	155	30
Fernando Llorente	Spain	FW	2019–2021	29	4
Diego Demme	Germany; Italy	MF	2020–2024	92	5
Stanislav Lobotka	Slovakia	MF	2020–	251	4
Matteo Politano	Italy	FW/MF	2020–	290	39
Victor Osimhen	Nigeria	FW	2020–2024	133	76
Andrea Petagna	Italy	FW	2020–2022	68	9
Tiémoué Bakayoko	France; Ivory Coast	MF	2020–2021	44	2
Amir Rrahmani	Kosovo; Albania	DF	2021–	214	15
Juan Jesus	Brazil	DF	2021–2026	130	5
André-Frank Zambo Anguissa	Cameroon	MF	2021–	183	16
Axel Tuanzebe	DR Congo; England	DF	2022	2	0
Kim Min-jae	South Korea	DF	2022–2023	45	2
Mathías Olivera	Uruguay	DF	2022–	144	3
Leo Skiri Østigård	Norway	DF	2022–2024	43	3
Tanguy Ndombele	France; DR Congo	MF	2022–2023	40	2
Khvicha Kvaratskhelia	Georgia	FW/MF	2022–2025	107	30
Alessio Zerbin	Italy	FW/MF	2022–2023; 2024-2025	27	2
Giacomo Raspadori	Italy	FW/MF	2022–2025	109	18
Giovanni Simeone	Argentina	FW	2022–2025	103	14
Pierluigi Gollini	Italy	GK	2023–2024	14	0
Bartosz Bereszyński	Poland	DF	2023	4	0
Jens Cajuste	Sweden	MF	2023–2024	35	0
Jesper Lindstrøm	Denmark	FW/MF	2023–2024	29	0
Pasquale Mazzocchi	Italy	DF/MF	2024–2026	54	0
Leander Dendoncker	Belgium	MF	2024	3	0
Hamed Traorè	Ivory Coast	MF	2024	11	0
Cyril Ngonge	Belgium; DR Congo	FW/MF	2024-2025	35	3
Walid Cheddira	Morocco; Italy	FW	2024	2	0
Alessandro Buongiorno	Italy	DF	2024–	65	1
Leonardo Spinazzola	Italy	DF/MF	2024–	81	4
Michael Folorunsho	Italy; Nigeria	MF	2024–2025	7	0
Billy Gilmour	Scotland	MF	2024–	57	2
Scott McTominay	Scotland; England	MF	2024–	89	31
David Neres	Brazil	FW/MF	2024–	61	9
Romelu Lukaku	Belgium; DR Congo	FW	2024–	45	15
Simone Scuffet	Italy	GK	2025	1	0
Philip Billing	Denmark; Nigeria	MF	2025	10	1
Noah Okafor	Switzerland; Nigeria	FW/MF	2025	4	0
Vanja Milinković-Savić	Serbia	GK	2025–	43	0
Kevin De Bruyne	Belgium	MF	2025–	34	9
Antonio Vergara	Italy	MF	2025–	26	4
Noa Lang	Netherlands	FW/MF	2025–2026 / 2026-	37	2
Lorenzo Lucca	Italy	FW	2025–2026 / 2026-	34	2
Rasmus Højlund	Denmark	FW	2025–	56	19
Benoît Badiashile	France	DF	2026–	5	0

== Captains ==
Appearances and goals are for the first team, including appearances as substitutes, correct as of 1 November 2026

Name	Position	Napoli career	Seasons as captain	Appearances	Goals
(Italy) (Brazil) Paulo Innocenti	DF	1926–1937	7 (1926–1933)	213	6
(Italy) (Paraguay) Attila Sallustro	FW	1926–1937	4 (1933–1937)	266	108
(Italy) Carlo Buscaglia	MF/FW	1928–1938	1 (1937–1938)	270	41
(Italy) Arnaldo Sentimenti	GK	1934–1943, 1945–1948	8 (1938–1943, 1945–1948)	235	0
(Italy) Egidio Di Costanzo	MF	1941–1943, 1945–1951	3 (1948–1951)	153	7
(Italy) Amedeo Amadei	FW	1950–1956	2 (1951–1953)	171	47
(Italy) (Argentina) Bruno Pesaola	FW/MF	1952–1960	7 (1953–1960)	253	27
(Italy) Ottavio Bugatti	GK	1953–1961	1 (1960–1961)	261	0
(Italy) Pierluigi Ronzon	DF/MF	1961–1967	5 (1961–1966)	227	15
(Italy) Antonio Juliano	MF	1962–1978	12 (1966–1978)	505	38
(Italy) Giuseppe Bruscolotti	DF	1972–1988	5 (1978–1980, 1983–1986)	511	11
(Italy) Claudio Vinazzani	MF	1976–1983	3 (1980–1983)	253	5
(Argentina) Diego Maradona	FW/MF	1984–1991	5 (1986–1991)	259	115
(Italy) Ciro Ferrara	DF	1984–1994	3 (1991–1994)	322	15
(Italy) (Libya) Roberto Bordin	MF/DF	1993–1997	3 (1994–1997)	122	0
(Argentina) Roberto Ayala	DF	1995–1998	1 (1997–1998)	96	1
(Italy) Giuseppe Taglialatela	GK	1990–1991, 1993–1999	1 (1998–1999)	203	0
(Italy) Francesco Baldini	DF	1995–2001, 2002–2003	2 (1999–2001)	195	2
(Italy) Oscar Magoni	MF	1999–2002	1 (2001–2002)	127	6
(Italy) Roberto Stellone	FW	1999–2003	1 (2002–2003)	102	33
(Italy) Dario Marcolin	MF	2003–2004	1 (2003–2004)	47	0
(Italy) Gennaro Scarlato	DF	1996–1999/ 1999–2000, 2004–2005	1 (2004–2005)	78	4
(Italy) Francesco Montervino	MF	2003–2004, 2004–2009	2 (2005–2007)	166	6
(Italy) Gianluca Grava	DF	2005–2013	1 (2007–2008)	180	2
(Italy) Paolo Cannavaro	DF	1998–1999, 2007–2014	6 (2008–2014)	278	9
(Slovakia) Marek Hamšík	MF	2007–2019	5 (2014–2019)	520	121
(Italy) Lorenzo Insigne	FW/MF	2009–2010, 2012–2022	4 (2019–2022)	434	122
(Italy) Giovanni Di Lorenzo	DF	2019–	5 (2022–)	318	20

== Key ==
- **GK** – Goalkeeper
- **DF** – Defender
- **MF** – Midfielder
- **FW** – Forward

Players in bold are still actively in team.

Nationalities are indicated by the corresponding FIFA country code.
