= 1987–88 SSC Napoli season =

Napoli
1987–88 season
- Owner: Corrado Ferlaino
- President: Corrado Ferlaino
- Head coach: Ottavio Bianchi
- Stadium: San Paolo
- Serie A: 2nd (in 1988–89 UEFA Cup)
- Coppa Italia: Quarter-finals
- European Cup: Last 32
- Top goalscorer: League: Diego Maradona (15); All: Diego Maradona (21)
Home colours	Away colours	Third colours

SSC Napoli only just failed to defend its inaugural Serie A title, finishing three points behind AC Milan. Napoli proved to be the most offensive team in the entire league, with Careca and Diego Maradona dominating the scoring charts. Due to Milan's strong defence that was not enough for the title, and due to a 3–2 defeat at home to the eventual champions, the title defence got out of reach.

== Squad ==
Note: Flags indicate national team as defined under FIFA eligibility rules; some limited exceptions apply. Players may hold more than one non-FIFA nationality.

Pos.	Nation	Player
GK	ITA	Claudio Garella
GK	ITA	Raffaele Di Fusco
GK	ITA	Giuseppe Taglialatela
DF	ITA	Tebaldo Bigliardi
DF	ITA	Giuseppe Bruscolotti
DF	ITA	Ciro Ferrara
DF	ITA	Moreno Ferrario
DF	ITA	Massimo Filardi
DF	ITA	Giovanni Francini
DF	ITA	Alessandro Renica

Pos.	Nation	Player
DF	ITA	Rosario Pergolizzi
MF	ITA	Salvatore Bagni
MF	ITA	Fernando De Napoli
MF	ITA	Francesco Romano
MF	ITA	Paolo Miano
MF	ITA	Luciano Sola
FW	ITA	Andrea Carnevale
FW	BRA	Careca
FW	ITA	Bruno Giordano
FW	ARG	Diego Maradona

=== Transfers ===
In
Pos.	Name	from	Type
FW	Careca	São Paulo FC	
DF	Rosario Pergolizzi	Olbia Calcio	
DF	Giovanni Francini	Torino	
FW	Francesco Baiano	Empoli F.C.	loan ended

Out
Pos.	Name	To	Type
MF	Costanzo Celestini	Ascoli	
DF	Antonio Carannante	Ascoli	
DF	Giuseppe Volpecina	Hellas Verona	

==== Winter ====
In
Pos.	Name	from	Type

Out
Pos.	Name	To	Type
FW	Francesco Baiano	Parma F.C.	loan

== Competitions ==
=== Serie A ===
==== League table ====
Pos	Team	Pld	W	D	L	GF	GA	GD	Pts	Qualification or relegation
1	Milan (C)	30	17	11	2	43	14	+29	45	Qualification to European Cup
2	Napoli	30	18	6	6	55	27	+28	42	Qualification to UEFA Cup
3	Roma	30	15	8	7	39	26	+13	38	Qualification to UEFA Cup
4	Sampdoria	30	13	11	6	41	30	+11	37	Qualification to Cup Winners' Cup
5	Internazionale	30	11	10	9	42	35	+7	32	Qualification to UEFA Cup

Source: 1987–88 Serie A, RSSSF.com
Rules for classification: 1) Points; 2) Head-to-head points; 3) Head-to-head goal difference; 4) Goal difference; 5) Goals scored; 6) Draw.
(C) Champions

==== Results by round ====
Round	1	2	3	4	5	6	7	8	9	10	11	12	13	14	15	16	17	18	19	20	21	22	23	24	25	26	27	28	29	30
Ground	H	A	H	A	H	H	A	H	A	H	A	H	A	H	A	A	H	A	H	A	A	H	A	H	A	H	A	H	A	H
Result	W	W	W	W	W	D	W	D	W	D	W	W	L	W	W	W	W	W	W	W	L	D	W	D	W	L	D	L	L	L
Position	1	1	1	1	1	1	1	1	1	1	1	1	1	1	1	1	1	1	1	1	1	1	1	1	1	1	1	2	2	2

Source: Competitive matches
A = Away; H = Home; W = Win; D = Draw; L = Loss; = 1988–89 European Cup; = 1988–89 UEFA Cup

=== Matches ===
13 September 1987 1	Cesena	0–1	Napoli	Cesena
		Report	Bagni 61'	Stadium: Stadio Dino Manuzzi

20 September 1987 2	Napoli	2–1	Ascoli	Naples
	Bagni 7'; Giordano 34'	Report	Scarafoni 18'	Stadium: San Paolo

27 September 1987 3	Pisa	0–2	Napoli	Pisa
		Report		Stadium: Arena Garibaldi

4 October 1987 4	Avellino	0–1	Napoli	Avellino
		Report	Carnevale 86'	Stadium: Partenio

11 October 1987 5	Napoli	6–0	Pescara	Naples
	Bagni 23'; Romano 29'; Careca 45'; Maradona 54' (pen.); Giordano 75' (pen.); Benini 83' (o.g.)	Report		Stadium: San Paolo

25 October 1987 6	Roma	1–1	Napoli	Rome
	Pruzzo 46'	Report	Francini 67'	Stadium: Olimpico

1 November 1987 7	Napoli	2–1	Empoli	Naples
	Maradona 17' (pen.) 35'	Report	Ekström 7'	Stadium: San Paolo

8 November 1987 8	Como	0–0	Napoli	Como
		Report		Stadium: Giuseppe Sinigaglia

22 November 1987 9	Napoli	3–1	Torino	Naples
	Maradona 6'; Careca 44', 90'	Report	Berggreen 76'	Stadium: San Paolo

29 November 1987 10	Inter	1–1	Napoli	Milan
	De Napoli 59' (o.g.)	Report	Careca 20'	Stadium: Giuseppe Meazza

13 December 1987 11	Napoli	2–1	Juventus	Naples
	De Napoli 26'; Maradona 87' (pen.)	Report	Cabrini 76'	Stadium: San Paolo

20 December 1987 12	Napoli	4–1	Verona	Naples
	Bagni 14'; Giordano 29', 89'; Maradona 54'	Report	Bagni 35' (o.g.)	Stadium: San Paolo

3 January 1988 13	Milan	4–1	Napoli	Milan
	Colombo 19'; Virdis 24'; Gullit 73'; Donadoni 78'	Report	Careca 10'	Stadium: San Siro

10 January 1988 14	Napoli	4–0	Fiorentina	Naples
	Giordano 3', 74'; Careca 33'; Maradona 35'	Report		Stadium: San Paolo

17 January 1988 15	Sampdoria	0–1	Napoli	Genoa
		Report	Maradona 87'	Stadium: Luigi Ferraris

24 January 1988 16	Napoli	2–0	Cesena	Naples
	Careca 9'; Maradona 43'	Report		Stadium: San Paolo

31 January 1988 17	Ascoli	1–3	Napoli	Ascoli Piceno
	Casagrande 8'	Report	Maradona 12' (pen.); Giordano 26'; Careca 49'	Stadium: Cino e Lillo Del Duca

7 February 1988 18	Napoli	2–1	Pisa	Naples
	Renica 13'; Maradona 76'	Report	Filardi 77' (o.g.)	Stadium: San Paolo

14 February 1988 19	Napoli	4–0	Avellino	Naples
	Renica 17'; Francini 19'; Maradona 22'; Romano 64'	Report		Stadium: San Paolo

28 February 1988 20	Pescara	0–1	Napoli	Pescara
		Report	Giordano 38'	Stadium: Adriatico

6 March 1988 21	Napoli	1–2	Roma	Naples
	Careca 80'	Report	Giannini 21'; Oddi 70'	Stadium: San Paolo

13 March 1988 22	Empoli	0–0	Napoli	Empoli
		Report		Stadium: Carlo Castellani

20 March 1988 23	Napoli	3–0	Como	Naples
	Careca 10', 48'; De Napoli 43'	Report		Stadium: San Paolo

27 March 1988 24	Torino	0–0	Napoli	Turin
		Report		Stadium: Comunale

10 April 1988 25	Napoli	1–0	Inter	Naples
	Maradona 24'	Report		Stadium: San Paolo

17 April 1988 26	Juventus	3–1	Napoli	Turin
	Cabrini 19'; Rush 67'; De Agostini 74'	Report	Careca 83'	Stadium: Comunale

24 April 1988 27	Verona	1–1	Napoli	Verona
	Galia 65'	Report	Maradona 25'	Stadium: Marcantonio Bentegodi

1 May 1988 28	Napoli	2–3	Milan	Naples
	Maradona 45'; Careca 78'	Report	Virdis 36', 68' van Basten 76'	Stadium: San Paolo

8 May 1988 29	Fiorentina	3–2	Napoli	Florence
	Di Chiara 8'; Díaz 58', 72'	Report	Ferrara 24'; Renica 90'	Stadium: Comunale

15 May 1988 30	Napoli	1–2	Sampdoria	Naples
	Carnevale 7'	Report	Pellegrini 59'; Vialli 67'	Stadium: San Paolo

=== Coppa Italia ===
First round

23 August 1987 1	Napoli	4–0	Modena	Naples
				Stadium: San Paolo

26 August 1987 2	Livorno	0–2	Napoli	Livorno
				Stadium: Armando Picchi

30 August 1987 3	Udinese	0–2	Napoli	Udine
				Stadium: Friuli

2 September 1987 4	Napoli	1–0	Padova	Naples
				Stadium: Stadio San Paolo

6 September 1987 5	Napoli	2–1	Fiorentina	Naples
				Stadium: San Paolo

Eightfinals

6 January 1988	Napoli	2–3	Fiorentina	Naples
	Maradona 18' (pen.); Careca 57'		Carobbi 44'; Onorati 52'; Diaz 80'	Stadium: San Paolo

20 January 1988	Fiorentina	1–3 (4–5 agg.)	Napoli	Florence
	Di Chiara 33'		Carnevale 50'; Renica 72'; Carnevale 81'	Stadium: Comunale

Quarterfinals

10 February 1988	Torino	1–1	Napoli	Turin
	Comi 4'		9' Renica	Stadium: Comunale

2 March 1988	Napoli	2–3 (3–4 agg.)	Torino	Naples
	Maradona 37', 50'		28' Gritti; 75' Comi; 80' Polster	Stadium: Stadio San Paolo

=== European Cup ===
Round of 16

16 September 1987	Real Madrid (Spain)	2–0	(Italy) Napoli	Madrid
	Míchel 18' (pen.); De Napoli 76' (o.g.)			Stadium: Santiago Bernabéu; Referee: (Romania) Igna

30 September 1987	Napoli (Italy)	1–1 (1–3 agg.)	(Spain) Real Madrid	Naples
	Francini 9'		44' Butragueño	Stadium: San Paolo; Attendance: 83 231; Referee: (West Germany) Pauly

== Statistics ==
=== Players statistics ===
No.	Pos	Nat	Player	Total		Serie A		Coppa		European Cup	
No.	Pos	Nat	Player	Apps	Goals	Apps	Goals	Apps	Goals	Apps	Goals
	GK	(Italy) ITA	Garella	40	-34	29	-25	9	-6	2	-3
	DF	(Italy) ITA	Ferrara	32	1	23	1	7	0	2	0
	DF	(Italy) ITA	Ferrario	36	0	27	0	7	0	2	0
	DF	(Italy) ITA	Renica	38	5	28	3	8	2	2	0
	DF	(Italy) ITA	Francini	38	4	30	2	7	1	1	1
	MF	(Italy) ITA	Bagni	33	4	26	4	5	0	2	0
	MF	(Italy) ITA	De Napoli	41	2	30	2	9	0	2	0
	MF	(Italy) ITA	Romano	35	2	26	2	7	0	2	0
	FW	(Brazil) BRA	Careca	34	18	26	13	7	5	1	0
	FW	(Italy) ITA	Giordano	38	11	23+4	8	9	3	2	0
	FW	(Argentina) ARG	Maradona	38	21	28	15	8	6	2	0
	GK	(Italy) ITA	Di Fusco	1	-2	1	-2				
	DF	(Italy) ITA	Filardi	20	5	11+9	0				
	DF	(Italy) ITA	Bigliardi	20	0	9+3	0	7	0	0+1	0
	FW	(Italy) ITA	Carnevale	24	4	6+13	2	4	2	0+1	0
	MF	(Italy) ITA	Miano	16	0	4+5	0	7	0		
	MF	(Italy) ITA	Sola	17	0	2+7	0	7	0	1	0
	DF	(Italy) ITA	Bruscolotti	10	0	1+6	0	2	0	1	0
	DF	(Italy) ITA	Pergolizzi	2	0	0+1	0	1	0		
	FW	(Italy) ITA	Baiano	5	0	0+1	0	3	0	0+1	0
	GK	(Italy) ITA	Taglialatela	0	0	0	0				
	MF	(Italy) ITA	Minopoli	1	0	0	0	1	0		

- Source: http://calcio-seriea.net/

== Sources ==
- RSSSF – Italy 1987/88
