= 1987 Coppa Italia final =

39th Coppa Italia final
- Event: 1986–87 Coppa Italia
Napoli	Atalanta
4	0
- on aggregate

First leg
Napoli	Atalanta
3	0
- Date: 7 June 1987
- Venue: Stadio San Paolo, Naples
- Referee: Giancarlo Ridini
- Attendance: 60,000

Second leg
Atalanta	Napoli
0	1
- Date: 13 June 1987
- Venue: Stadio Atleti Azzurri d'Italia, Bergamo
- Referee: Carlo Longhi
- Attendance: 11,200

The 1987 Coppa Italia final was the final of the 1986–87 Coppa Italia. The match was played over two legs on 7 and 13 June 1987 between Napoli and Atalanta. Napoli won 4–0 on aggregate.

== First leg ==
7 June 1987
21:00

Napoli	3–0	Atalanta
Renica 67'; Muro 71'; Bagni 77'

Stadio San Paolo, Naples
Attendance: 60,000
Referee: Giancarlo Ridini

Napoli	Atalanta

GK	1	(Italy) Claudio Garella
RB	2	(Italy) Ciro Ferrara
CB	5	(Italy) Moreno Ferrario
CB	6	(Italy) Alessandro Renica
LB	3	(Italy) Giuseppe Volpecina	(substituted off) 88'
DM	4	(Italy) Salvatore Bagni
CM	7	(Italy) Luciano Sola	(substituted off) 59'
CM	8	(Italy) Francesco Romano
AM	10	(Argentina) Diego Maradona (c)
CF	9	(Italy) Bruno Giordano
CF	11	(Italy) Andrea Carnevale	(substituted off) 81'
Substitutes:
MF		(Italy) Ciro Muro	(substituted in) 59'
MF		(Italy) Luigi Caffarelli	(substituted in) 81'
DF		(Italy) Tebaldo Bigliardi	(substituted in) 88'
Manager:
(Italy) Ottavio Bianchi

GK	1	(Italy) Ottorino Piotti
RB	2	(Italy) Gianpaolo Rossi	(substituted off) 81'
CB	5	(Italy) Costanzo Barcella
CB	6	(Italy) Domenico Progna
LB	3	(Italy) Carmine Gentile
DM	4	(Italy) Cesare Prandelli
CM	7	(Sweden) Glenn Strömberg
CM	8	(Italy) Valter Bonacina
AM	10	(Italy) Marino Magrin (c)
CF	9	(Italy) Giuseppe Incocciati	(substituted off) 84'
CF	11	(Italy) Giuseppe Compagno	(substituted off) 82'
Substitutes:
FW		(Italy) Aldo Cantarutti	(substituted in) 81'
MF		(Italy) Bruno Limido	(substituted in) 82'
DF		(Italy) Luigino Pasciullo	(substituted in) 84'
Manager:
(Italy) Nedo Sonetti

== Second leg ==
13 June 1987
21:00

Atalanta	0–1	Napoli
		Giordano 85'

Stadio Atleti Azzurri d'Italia, Bergamo
Attendance: 11,200
Referee: Carlo Longhi

Atalanta	Napoli

GK	1	(Italy) Ottorino Piotti
RB	2	(Italy) Gianpaolo Rossi	(substituted off) 75'
CB	5	(Italy) Costanzo Barcella
CB	6	(Italy) Domenico Progna
LB	3	(Italy) Carmine Gentile
DM	4	(Italy) Andrea Icardi
CM	7	(Sweden) Glenn Strömberg
CM	8	(Italy) Valter Bonacina
AM	10	(Italy) Marino Magrin (c)
CF	9	(Italy) Giuseppe Compagno
CF	11	(Italy) Bruno Limido	(substituted off) 54'
Substitutes:
FW		(Italy) Aldo Cantarutti	(substituted in) 54'
DF		(Italy) Eugenio Perico	(substituted in) 75'
Manager:
(Italy) Nedo Sonetti

GK	1	(Italy) Claudio Garella
RB	2	(Italy) Ciro Ferrara
CB	5	(Italy) Tebaldo Bigliardi
CB	6	(Italy) Moreno Ferrario
LB	3	(Italy) Giuseppe Volpecina	(substituted off) 46'
DM	4	(Italy) Salvatore Bagni
CM	8	(Italy) Fernando De Napoli	(substituted off) 75'
CM	11	(Italy) Francesco Romano
AM	10	(Argentina) Diego Maradona (c)
CF	9	(Italy) Bruno Giordano
CF	7	(Italy) Andrea Carnevale	(substituted off) 60'
Substitutes:
DF		(Italy) Giuseppe Bruscolotti	(substituted in) 46'
MF		(Italy) Ciro Muro	(substituted in) 60'
MF		(Italy) Luigi Caffarelli	(substituted in) 75'
Manager:
(Italy) Ottavio Bianchi

== See also ==
- 1986–87 SSC Napoli season
