= 1985–86 SSC Napoli season =

Napoli
1985–86 season
- Owner: Corrado Ferlaino
- President: Corrado Ferlaino
- Head coach: Ottavio Bianchi
- Stadium: San Paolo
- Serie A: 3rd (In 1986–87 UEFA Cup)
- Coppa Italia: First round
- Top goalscorer: League: Diego Maradona (11); All: Maradona (13)
| Home colours | Away colours |

S.S.C. Napoli had its best league season in five years, finishing third in the 1985–86 league season. Due to Roma's collapse in the final rounds of the season, Napoli closed to within two points of second place, also having a significant margin to Torino in fourth. Diego Maradona prepared for his glorious World Cup with eleven goals and several assists.

== Squad ==
Note: Flags indicate national team as defined under FIFA eligibility rules; some limited exceptions apply. Players may hold more than one non-FIFA nationality.

| Pos. | Nation | Player |
|---|---|---|
| GK | ITA | Claudio Garella |
| GK | ITA | Enrico Zazzaro |
| DF | ITA | Giuseppe Bruscolotti |
| DF | ITA | Raimondo Marino |
| DF | ITA | Moreno Ferrario |
| DF | ITA | Ciro Ferrara |
| DF | ITA | Antonio Carannante |
| DF | ITA | Alessandro Renica |
| DF | ITA | Massimo Filardi |
| MF | ITA | Luigi Caffarelli |

| Pos. | Nation | Player |
|---|---|---|
| MF | ITA | Eraldo Pecci |
| MF | ITA | Costanzo Celestini |
| MF | ITA | Salvatore Bagni |
| MF | ITA | Massimiliano Favo |
| MF | ITA | Ruben Buriani |
| FW | ARG | Diego Maradona |
| FW | ITA | Bruno Giordano |
| FW | ARG | Daniel Bertoni |
| FW | ITA | Francesco Baiano |
| FW | ITA | Domenico Penzo |

=== Transfers ===
In
| Pos. | Name | from | Type |
|---|---|---|---|
| FW | Bruno Giordano | S.S. Lazio | |
| DF | Alessandro Renica | Sampdoria | |
| GK | Claudio Garella | Hellas Verona | |
| MF | Eraldo Pecci | Fiorentina | |
| MF | Ruben Buriani | A.S. Roma | loan |
| DF | Massimo Filardi | Varese | |

Out
| Pos. | Name | To | Type |
|---|---|---|---|
| DF | Marco De Simone | Catania Calcio | |
| MF | Walter De Vecchi | Bologna F.C. | |
| DF | Simone Boldini | Atalanta B.C. | |
| MF | Paolo Dal Fiume | Udinese Calcio | |
| DF | Ugo Napolitano | Campania | loan |
| MF | Pietro Puzone | Catania Calcio | loan |

== Competitions ==
=== Serie A ===
==== League table ====
| Pos | Team | Pld | W | D | L | GF | GA | GD | Pts | Qualification or relegation |
|---|---|---|---|---|---|---|---|---|---|---|
| 1 | Juventus (C) | 30 | 18 | 9 | 3 | 43 | 17 | +26 | 45 | Qualification to European Cup |
| 2 | Roma | 30 | 19 | 3 | 8 | 51 | 27 | +24 | 41 | Qualification to Cup Winners' Cup |
| 3 | Napoli | 30 | 14 | 11 | 5 | 35 | 21 | +14 | 39 | Qualification to UEFA Cup |
| 4 | Torino | 30 | 11 | 11 | 8 | 31 | 26 | +5 | 33 | Qualification to UEFA Cup |
| 5 | Fiorentina | 30 | 10 | 13 | 7 | 29 | 23 | +6 | 33 | Qualification to UEFA Cup |

Source: RSSSF.com
Rules for classification: 1) Points; 2) Head-to-head points; 3) Head-to-head goal difference; 4) Goal difference; 5) Goals scored; 6) Draw. (Note: Head-to-head record is used only after all the matches between the teams in question have been played).
(C) Champions

==== Results by round ====
| Round | 1 | 2 | 3 | 4 | 5 | 6 | 7 | 8 | 9 | 10 | 11 | 12 | 13 | 14 | 15 | 16 | 17 | 18 | 19 | 20 | 21 | 22 | 23 | 24 | 25 | 26 | 27 | 28 | 29 | 30 |
|---|---|---|---|---|---|---|---|---|---|---|---|---|---|---|---|---|---|---|---|---|---|---|---|---|---|---|---|---|---|---|
| Ground | H | A | H | H | A | A | H | A | H | A | H | A | H | A | H | A | H | A | A | H | H | A | H | A | H | A | H | A | H | A |
| Result | W | D | W | D | D | D | W | L | W | D | D | W | W | L | W | D | L | D | L | W | D | D | W | D | W | L | W | W | W | W |
| Position | 1 | 4 | 2 | 2 | 2 | 3 | 3 | 4 | 3 | 3 | 2 | 2 | 2 | 2 | 2 | 2 | 3 | 3 | 4 | 3 | 3 | 3 | 3 | 3 | 3 | 3 | 3 | 3 | 3 | 3 |

Source: Competitive matches
A = Away; H = Home; W = Win; D = Draw; L = Loss; P = Postponed; = Leader, 1986–87 European Cup; = 1986–87 UEFA Cup; = 1986-87 Serie B

==== Matches ====
| 8 September 1985 1 | Napoli | 2–1 | Como | Naples |
| | Giordano 32'; Bertoni 43' | Report | Marino 78' (o.g.) | Stadium: San Paolo; Referee: Marino |

| 15 September 1985 2 | Pisa | 1–1 | Napoli | Pisa |
| | Berggreen 33' | Report | Giordano 50' | Stadium: Arena Garibaldi; Referee: Lanese |

| 22 September 1985 3 | Napoli | 1–0 | Atalanta | Naples |
| | Renica 51' | Report | | Stadium: San Paolo; Referee: Lo Bello |

| 29 September 1985 4 | Napoli | 1–1 | Roma | Naples |
| | Maradona 52' (pen.) | Report | Tovalieri 37' | Stadium: San Paolo; Referee: Pieri |

| 6 October 1985 5 | Lecce | 0–0 | Napoli | Lecce |
| | | Report | | Stadium: Via del Mare; Referee: Casarin |

| 13 October 1985 6 | Fiorentina | 0–0 | Napoli | Florence |
| | | Report | | Stadium: Comunale; Referee: Lanese |

| 20 October 1985 7 | Napoli | 5–0 | Verona | Naples |
| | Giordano 21'; Bagni 48'; Maradona 58'; Bertoni 83'; Pecci 85' | Report | | Stadium: San Paolo; Referee: Lo Bello |

| 27 October 1985 8 | Torino | 2–1 | Napoli | Turin |
| | Sabato 45'; Comi 54' | Report | Maradona 87' | Stadium: Comunale; Referee: Bergamo |

| 3 November 1985 9 | Napoli | 1–0 | Juventus | Naples |
| | Maradona 72' | Report | | Stadium: San Paolo; Referee: Redini |

| 10 November 1985 10 | Inter | 1–1 | Napoli | Milan |
| | Brady 73' (pen.) | Report | Maradona 49' | Stadium: Giuseppe Meazza; Referee: Longhi |

| 24 November 1985 11 | Napoli | 1–1 | Udinese | Naples |
| | Maradona 9' | Report | Galparoli 79' | Stadium: San Paolo; Referee: Mattei |

| 1 December 1985 12 | Bari | 1–2 | Napoli | Bari |
| | Sola 3' | Report | Giordano 12', 59' | Stadium: della Vittoria; Referee: Casarin |

| 8 December 1985 13 | Napoli | 2–0 | Milan | Naples |
| | Giordano 76'; Bagni 86' | Report | | Stadium: San Paolo; Referee: Lanese |

| 15 December 1985 14 | Sampdoria | 2–0 | Napoli | Genoa |
| | Lorenzo 14'; Mancini 41' | Report | | Stadium: Luigi Ferraris |

| 22 December 1985 15 | Napoli | 1–0 | Avellino | Naples |
| | Giordano 59' | Report | | Stadium: San Paolo |

| 5 January 1986 16 | Como | 1–1 | Napoli | Como |
| | Renica 55' (o.g.) | Report | Maradona 83' (pen.) | Stadium: Giuseppe Sinigaglia; Referee: Paparesta |

| 12 January 1986 17 | Napoli | 0–1 | Pisa | Naples |
| | | Report | Berggreen 39' | Stadium: San Paolo; Referee: Lombardo |

| 19 January 1986 18 | Atalanta | 0–0 | Napoli | Bergamo |
| | | Report | | Stadium: Atleti Azzurri d'Italia; Referee: Agnolin |

| 26 January 1986 19 | Roma | 2–0 | Napoli | Rome |
| | Gerolin 42'; Boniek 61' | Report | | Stadium: Olimpico; Referee: Magni |

| 9 February 1986 20 | Napoli | 1–0 | Lecce | Naples |
| | Bertoni 43' | Report | | Stadium: San Paolo; Referee: Longhi |

| 16 February 1986 21 | Napoli | 0–0 | Fiorentina | Naples |
| | | Report | | Stadium: San Paolo; Referee: Lo Bello |

| 23 February 1986 22 | Verona | 2–2 | Napoli | Verona |
| | Sacchetti 28'; Galderisi 53' (pen.) | Report | Maradona 55' (pen.) 80' | Stadium: Marcantonio Bentegodi; Referee: Bianciardi |

| 2 March 1986 23 | Napoli | 3–1 | Torino | Naples |
| | Ferri 15' (o.g.); Caffarelli 16'; Bagni 50' | Report | Mariani 14' | Stadium: San Paolo; Referee: Magni |

| 9 March 1986 24 | Juventus | 1–1 | Napoli | Turin |
| | Brio 49' | Report | Favero 34' (o.g.) | Stadium: Comunale; Referee: Lo Bello |

| 16 March 1986 25 | Napoli | 1–0 | Inter | Naples |
| | Maradona 71' (pen.) | Report | | Stadium: San Paolo; Referee: Pairetto |

| 23 March 1986 26 | Udinese | 2–0 | Napoli | Udine |
| | Carnevale 20'; Carnevale 61' | Report | | Stadium: Friuli; Referee: Casarin |

| 6 April 1986 27 | Napoli | 1–0 | Bari | Naples |
| | Renica 51' | Report | | Stadium: San Paolo; Referee: Sguizzato |

| 13 April 1986 28 | Milan | 1–2 | Napoli | Milan |
| | Di Bartolomei 59' | Report | Giordano 12'; Maradona 23' | Stadium: San Siro; Referee: Paparesta |

| 20 April 1986 29 | Napoli | 3–0 | Sampdoria | Naples |
| | Giordano 28'; Bagni 40'; Celestini 85' | Report | | Stadium: San Paolo; Referee: Pairetto |

| 27 April 1986 30 | Avellino | 0–1 | Napoli | Avellino |
| | | Report | Giordano 52' | Stadium: Partenio; Referee: Baldas |

=== Coppa Italia ===
First round

| 21 August 1985 1 | Napoli | 0–0 | Pescara | Naples |
| | | | | Stadium: San Paolo; Referee: Boschi |

| 25 August 1985 2 | Lanerossi | 1–0 | Napoli | Vicenza |
| | Filippi 30' | | | Stadium: Romeo Menti; Referee: Longhi |

| 28 August 1985 3 | Padova | 0–0 | Napoli | Padua |
| | | | | Stadium: Silvio Appiani; Referee: Lanese |

| 1 September 1985 4 | Napoli | 3–1 | Salernitana | Naples |
| | Maradona 5', 35' (pen.); Manzo 77' (o.g.) | | 25' (pen.) Billia | Stadium: San Paolo; Referee: Magni |

| 4 September 1985 5 | Napoli | 2–0 | Lecce | Naples |
| | Giordano 23'; Bagni 85' | | | Stadium: San Paolo; Referee: Mattei |

== Statistics ==
=== Players statistics ===
| No. | Pos | Nat | Player | Total | | Serie A | | Coppa | |
| No. | Pos | Nat | Player | Apps | Goals | Apps | Goals | Apps | Goals |
|---|---|---|---|---|---|---|---|---|---|
| | GK | (Italy) ITA | Garella | 30 | -21 | 30 | -21 | | |
| | DF | (Italy) ITA | Brusculotti | 25 | 0 | 25 | 0 | | |
| | DF | (Italy) ITA | Ferrario | 26 | 0 | 26 | 0 | | |
| | DF | (Italy) ITA | Renica | 28 | 2 | 28 | 2 | | |
| | DF | (Italy) ITA | Filardi | 26 | 0 | 23+3 | 0 | | |
| | MF | (Argentina) ARG | Bertoni | 26 | 3 | 24+2 | 3 | | |
| | MF | (Italy) ITA | Pecci | 24 | 1 | 24 | 1 | | |
| | MF | (Italy) ITA | Bagni | 27 | 4 | 27 | 4 | | |
| | MF | (Italy) ITA | Celestini | 25 | 1 | 23+2 | 1 | | |
| | FW | (Italy) ITA | Giordano | 25 | 10 | 22+3 | 10 | | |
| | FW | (Argentina) ARG | Maradona | 29 | 11 | 29 | 11 | | |
| | GK | (Italy) ITA | Zazzaro | 0 | 0 | 0 | 0 | | |
| | DF | (Italy) ITA | Carannante | 20 | 0 | 16+4 | 0 | | |
| | MF | (Italy) ITA | Caffarelli | 26 | 1 | 14+12 | 1 | | |
| | DF | (Italy) ITA | Marino | 12 | 0 | 8+4 | 0 | | |
| | DF | (Italy) ITA | Ferrara | 14 | 0 | 4+10 | 0 | | |
| | MF | (Italy) ITA | Buriani | 5 | 0 | 3+2 | 0 | | |
| | FW | (Italy) ITA | Penzo | 6 | 0 | 2+4 | 0 | | |
| | MF | (Italy) ITA | Favo | 5 | 0 | 1+4 | 0 | | |
| | FW | (Italy) ITA | Baiano | 4 | 0 | 1+3 | 0 | | |
| | MF | (Italy) ITA | Cimmaruta | 1 | 0 | 0+1 | 0 | | |
| | DF | (Italy) ITA | Maggiotto | 0 | 0 | 0 | 0 | | |
| | DF | (Italy) ITA | Ferrara | 0 | 0 | 0 | 0 | | |

- Source: http://calcio-seriea.net/presenze/1985/924/
