= Comaschi =

Comaschi is an Italian surname. Notable people with the surname include:

- Antonio Comaschi (born 1951), Argentine boxer
- Luciano Comaschi (1931–2019), Italian footballer
- Carla Comaschi, Italian actress
