= Chiarella =

Chiarella is an Italian surname. Notable people with the surname include:

- José Chiarella (1929-2019), Peruvian football manager
- Mary Chiarella, British-born Australian nursing educator
- Tom Chiarella, American writer
- Walter Chiarella (born 1963), Italian footballer and manager
- Hugo Chiarella, Australian writer and director

== See also ==
- Chiarella v. United States, a United States Supreme Court case
- Chiarella, a genus of hydrozoans in the family Bougainvilliidae
