= Ciro Muro =

Italian footballer (born 1964)

Personal information
- Date of birth: 9 March 1964 (age 62)
- Place of birth: Italy
- Height: 1.73 m (5 ft 8 in)
- Position: Midfielder

Senior career*
Years	Team	Apps	(Gls)
1983–1984	Napoli	1	(0)
1984–1985	Monopoli	34	(5)
1985–1986	Pisa	29	(4)
1986–1987	Napoli	11	(1)
1987–1989	Lazio	61	(4)
1989–1990	Cosenza	35	(2)
1990–1991	Messina	30	(1)
1991–1993	Taranto	71	(9)
1993–1995	Ischia	58	(1)
1995–1997	Albanova	54	(10)
1997–1998	Sant'Anastasia		
1998–1999	Casertana		
1999–2000	Viribus Unitis		
2001	Pomigliano		
- * Club domestic league appearances and goals

Ciro Muro (9 March 1964) is an Italian football manager and former footballer who played as a midfielder.

== Early life ==
Muro is a native of Naples, Italy.

== Career ==
Muro started his career with Italian Serie A side Napoli, later helping the club win the 1986–87 Coppa Italia (scoring a goal in 3–0 victory over Atalanta in the first leg of the final) and the 1986–87 Serie A title (scoring one goal in 11 appearances, which came in a 3–0 win over Ascoli on 11 January 1987).

== Style of play ==
Muro was considered to be a highly talented and promising player in his youth, with good technique and free kick-taking abilities; he often served as a back-up to Diego Maradona at Napoli, and was even nicknamed "Murodona" by the club's fans. However, his performances declined as his career progressed.

== Personal life ==
Muro is the son of a gardener.

== Honours ==
Napoli

- Serie A: 1986–87
- Coppa Italia: 1986–87
