= Giuseppe Volpecina =

Italian footballer

Personal information
- Date of birth: 1 May 1961 (age 65)
- Place of birth: Caserta, Italy
- Height: 1.77 m (5 ft 10 in)
- Position: Defender

Senior career*
Years	Team	Apps	(Gls)
1976–1977	Casertana	2	(0)
1977–1987	Napoli	28	(2)
1980–1984	→ Palermo (loan)	133	(6)
1984–1986	→ Pisa (loan)	66	(3)
1987–1989	Verona	58	(2)
1989–1991	Fiorentina	38	(1)
1991–1992	Casertana	30	(1)
Total		355	(15)
- * Club domestic league appearances and goals

Giuseppe Volpecina (born 1 May 1961 in Caserta) is an Italian professional footballer who played as a defender.

== Honours ==
Napoli

- Serie A: 1986–87
- Coppa Italia: 1986–87
