= Paulo Innocenti =

Italian-Brazilian footballer

Personal information
- Full name: Paulo Innocenti
- Date of birth: 11 March 1902
- Place of birth: Rio Grande do Sul, Brazil
- Date of death: 13 July 1983 (aged 81)
- Place of death: Naples, Italy
- Position: Defender

Senior career*
Years	Team	Apps	(Gls)
1921–1923	Paulistano	?	(?)
1923–1924	Virtus Bologna	21	(0)
1924–1926	Bologna	13	(0)
1926–1937	Napoli	213	(6)

International career
1931	Italy B	4	(0)

Managerial career
- 1943: Napoli
- * Club domestic league appearances and goals

Paulo Innocenti (11 March 1902 – 13 July 1983) was an Italian-Brazilian professional footballer who played as a defender.

== Club career ==
Throughout his club career, Innocenti played for Brazilian club Club Athletico Paulistano, and later played for several Italian clubs, such as Virtus Bologna, Bologna, and Napoli, also serving as the latter side's captain, and winning the league title with Bologna in 1925.

== International career ==
At international level, Innocenti earned 4 caps for the Italy B side in 1931.

== Managerial career ==
Following his retirement, Innocenti served as manager of Napoli in 1943.

== Honours ==
Bologna

- Divisione Nazionale champion: 1924–25.

Sporting positions
Preceded by N/A	Napoli captain 1926–1933	Succeeded by Attila Sallustro
