= Corrado Ferlaino =

Italian engineer and building contractor

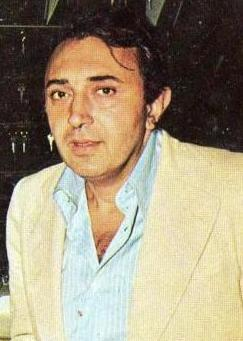
- Born: 18 May 1931 (age 95); Naples, Italy
- Occupation: Building contractor
- Known for: Former chairman of Napoli

Corrado Ferlaino (born 18 May 1931) is an Italian engineer and building contractor, best known as the former owner of Napoli for 32 years, in non-continuous periods.

== Life and career ==
Born in Napoli in 1931 from Modesto, an engineer and builder from Calabria who had moved to Napoli in 1920, and Cecilia Pasquali, a woman from Milan. In 1942, Ferlaino moved to Fermo with his mother to escape the bombing taking place in Napoli during World War II. He returned to Naples after the war, graduating from the "Vincenzo Cuoco" scientific high school of Naples. After graduation, he tried his luck as a racing driver, amateur footballer, and film producer.

After completing his degree in civil engineering at the University of Bari, Ferlaino founded his own construction company and began building houses in the Vomero and Arenella districts before gradually expanding into other residential areas in Italy. By the 1990s, he is the head of a group holding 43 companies – the bigger being Iper S.r.l. and Delvecchio Construction – producing revenue of ₤400 billion.

In 2002, he entered the hospitality industry.

He has been married four times, and he is a father of five, including his daughter Francesca.

== Chairman of Napoli ==
In 1967, Ferlaino became a minority shareholder of Napoli, whose chairman was Gioacchino Lauro. In 1969, he expanded his financial involvement by spending ₤70 million to buy 33% of the club from Antonio Corcione, who had recently died. The rest of the club was owned by Achille Lauro and Roberto Fiore in equal share.

In 1969, Ferlaino managed to get elected chairman with the support of Lauro, who was in contrast with Fiore. Later, Ferlaino became the main shareholder following the acquisition of Fiore's share.

Ferlaino retained his role until 1993, with the short interruptions in 1972 and 1983. Under his management, the club experienced one of the most successful spells of its history in the 1980s, when – also thanks to the performances of Diego Maradona on the pitch – Napoli won two Serie A titles (1986–87 and 1989–90), the 1986–87 Coppa Italia, the 1988–89 UEFA Cup, and the 1990 Supercoppa Italiana.

In 1993, he sold Napoli to Elenio Gallo but returned as the major shareholder two years later. In 2000, he sold half of his share to Giorgio Corbelli, who became chairman. Ferlaino sold the rest of his share two years later, ending his involvement with the club.

In 2015, he was inducted into the Italian Football Hall of Fame.
