= Walter Chiarella =

Italian footballer

Personal information
- Full name: Nicola Walter Chiarella
- Date of birth: 30 July 1963 (age 63)
- Place of birth: Foggia, Italy
- Height: 1.80 m (5 ft 11 in)
- Position: Right winger

Youth career
- Foggia

Senior career*
Years	Team	Apps	(Gls)
1980–1981	Foggia	0	(0)
1981–1982	Lanciano	11	(1)
1982–1983	Manfredonia	14	(3)
1983–1984	Foggia	6	(0)
1984–1985	Pro Italia Galatina	34	(8)
oct. 1985–1986	Nola	26	(20)
1986–1989	Catanzaro	47	(10)
1989–1991	Ternana	20	(3)
1993–1994	Bisceglie	6	(2)
1994–1995	Foggia	0	(0)
1995–1996	Campobasso	11	(3)
1996–1997	Tricase	16	(8)
1997	Sanità Nola	1	(0)
nov. 1997–1998	Giugliano	8	(2)
1999	Matera	10	(6)
1999–2000	Audace Cerignola	3	(0)

Managerial career
- 2001: Barletta
- 2003–2004: Monti Dauni
- 2006–2007: Foggia Giovanissimi
- 2009–2010: Monti Dauni
- 2011–2012: Foggia Second
- 2013–2014: Gioventù Calcio Dauna
- 2015: Termoli
- 2017–: Manfredonia
- * Club domestic league appearances and goals

Nicola Walter Chiarella (born 30 July 1963) is an Italian former footballer who played as a right winger.

== Playing career ==
Chiarella began his professional career with Foggia in 1980, and subsequently transferred to Lanciano the following year, where he scored two goals in 18 matches.

Later, Chiarella played in many teams in the lower Italian division, such as Manfredonia, Foggia once again, Pro Italia Galatina, and Nola, where he was the top scorer.

In 1986, he transferred to Catanzaro, staying for two years and scoring ten goals in 47 matches (20 of these matches were played in Serie B).

Later Chiarella was banned for two years for corruption charges.

In 1989 after a long period of inactivity due to a road accident, Chiarella transferred to Ternana, where he remained until 1991, scoring 3 goals in 20 games. He moved to Bisceglie in Serie C2 the following season where he once again scored only two goals in six matches. Afterwards, he returned to Foggia in serie A in 1994, but did not play for the club. The following seasons Chiarella played in lower-division Italian teams, such as Campobasso, Tricase, Sanità Nola, Giugliano, until he retired in 2000, after one season with Audace Cerignola.

== Coaching career ==
Chiarella started his coaching career in 2001 with Barletta. Later, in 2006, he managed the Foggia under 15 team, called Giovanissimi. In 2009 Chiarella signed with Monti Dauni in Promozione Molise, and later won the tournament, which led to his team being promoted to Eccellenza Molise; however, in December 2010, he quit his job. In October 2011 he became Foggia's second coach.

== Trivia ==
In Giovanni Trapattoni's first match with Internazionale, in the 1986–87 Coppa Italia at the San Siro stadium in Milan, Chiarella scored a goal for Catanzaro, although the match eventually finished in a 4–1 away defeat to Inter.
