= Aldo Cantarutti =

Italian footballer (born 1958)

Personal information
- Date of birth: 17 January 1958 (age 68)
- Place of birth: Manzano, Italy
- Height: 1.87 m (6 ft 2 in)
- Position: Forward

Youth career
- –1977: Torino

Senior career*
Years	Team	Apps	(Gls)
1977–1979	Torino	1	(0)
1977–1978	→ Monza (loan)	18	(2)
1978–1979	→ Lazio (loan)	9	(1)
1979–1981	Pisa	59	(18)
1981–1984	Catania	92	(25)
1984–1985	Ascoli	27	(5)
1985–1988	Atalanta	60	(15)
1989	Brescia	4	(2)
1989–1990	Lanerossi Vicenza	29	(9)
Total		299	(77)

International career
1977	Italy U20	1	(0)
1979	Italy U21	1	(0)
- * Club domestic league appearances and goals

Aldo Cantarutti (born 17 January 1958) is an Italian former footballer who played as a forward.

== Club career ==
Cantarutti began his career at Torino, where he made his debut in a 3–1 win against Catanzaro on 10 April 1977. Over the next two seasons, he was loaned out to Monza and Lazio, before being released by Torino at the end of 1978–79 season. Shortly after, he joined Pisa, where he scored 18 goals for the club before joining Catania for around 900 million lire in the summer of 1981.

At Catania, he scored a brace during a 2–0 win against Pisa, the club's only win of the 1983–84 Serie A season. That season, he scored four of Catania's 14 goals, as the club finished last in Serie A, although a fifth goal was controversially ruled out near the end of a match against AC Milan, after he scored a scissor kick that was ruled out by referee Vittorio Benedetti for dangerous play.

After leaving Catania, Cantarutti joined Ascoli, before joining Atalanta in 1985. There, he scored in a 1–1 away draw against Sporting CP in the 1987–88 European Cup Winners' Cup quarter-finals, which secured Atalanta's qualification to the semi-finals. He later played for Brescia and Lanerossi Vicenza, before retiring in 1990.

== International career ==
In 1977, Cantarutti was called up to the Italy under-20 national team for the 1977 FIFA World Youth Championship in Tunisia. He later played one match for Italy's under-21 national team in February 1979, in a 1–0 defeat to the Soviet Union.

== Post-playing career ==
Following his retirement, Cantarutti worked as a scout for the likes of Atalanta, Valencia, Lecce, Celta Vigo, and Vicenza.

== In popular culture ==
Cantarutti appeared in the film Al bar dello sport, as a footballer on television, where he scored a brace in a 2–1 win against Juventus, which helps Lino win 1.3 billion lire at a Totocalcio. The real match the scene used ended in a 2–0 win for Juventus, with both goals scored by defender Gaetano Scirea.
