= Pietro Puzone =

Italian footballer (born 1963)

Pietro Puzone (born 1 February 1963) is an Italian former professional footballer who played as a winger.

== Playing career ==
At the age of nineteen, Puzone debuted for Italian Serie A side Napoli during a 2–0 loss to Cesena, and was regarded as a prospect for Napoli. After that, he played for Italian sides Cavese, Akragas, Catania, Spezia and Ischia Isolaverde, before retiring from professional football at the age of twenty-seven.

== Post-playing career ==
After retiring from professional football, Puzone became homeless due to drug and alcohol addiction.

== Style of play ==
Puzone mainly operated as a right winger.
