= Fernando De Napoli =

Italian footballer

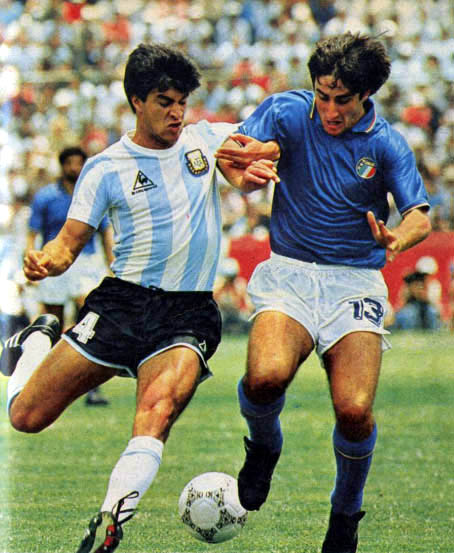

Personal information
- Full name: Fernando De Napoli
- Date of birth: 15 March 1964 (age 62)
- Place of birth: Chiusano di San Domenico, Italy
- Height: 1.78 m (5 ft 10 in)
- Position: Midfielder

Youth career
- Avellino

Senior career*
Years	Team	Apps	(Gls)
1982–1983	Rimini	31	(2)
1983–1986	Avellino	73	(3)
1986–1992	Napoli	176	(8)
1992–1994	A.C. Milan	9	(0)
1994–1997	Reggiana	58	(0)
Total		347	(13)

International career
1984–1986	Italy U-21	16	(1)
1986–1992	Italy	54	(1)
Medal record
Men's football
Representing Italy
FIFA World Cup
Third place	1990 Italy
- * Club domestic league appearances and goals

Fernando De Napoli Cavaliere OMRI (Italian pronunciation: [ferˈnando de ˈnaːpoli]; born 15 March 1964) is an Italian former professional footballer, who played either as a central midfielder or as a winger during the 1980s and 1990s. He is best known in club football for being a regular in the Napoli team that won 4 major trophies in 4 seasons between 1986 and 1990. He then joined Milan who won numerous trophies in his two seasons there although he made less than 10 league appearances when at Milan. At international level, he represented Italy at two FIFA World Cups (1986 and 1990), and at UEFA Euro 1988.

== Club career ==
De Napoli began his football career with Rimini Calcio in Serie C, under manager Arrigo Sacchi. He spent a year with the club before moving to Serie A club Avellino in the summer of 1983 and stayed with "Lupi" for three years.

He moved to Campania neighbours S.S.C. Napoli in 1986 at the beginning of what would become the most celebrated period in the club's history. De Napoli often played alongside Salvatore Bagni in midfield, serving as a defensive foil to the club's star playmaker Diego Maradona. During his six-year spell in Naples, De Napoli won the scudetto in 1987 and 1990, the Coppa Italia in 1987, the UEFA Cup in 1989, and the Supercoppa Italiana in 1990.

He signed for A.C. Milan in 1992, winning the scudetto in both of his seasons at the Milanese club (1992–93 and 1993–94), as well as another Supercoppa Italiana winners medal in 1993. In addition to these domestic titles, he won a UEFA Champions League in 1994. He was not, however, a first team regular and made only nine league appearances in two seasons for the club.

In July 1994, De Napoli moved to Reggiana. He stayed with the club, who at the time were playing in Serie A, until 1997 when he announced his retirement from playing. He then joined Reggiana's coaching staff where he remained until 2005.

== International career ==
De Napoli won his first cap for the Azzurri on 11 May 1986 for a 2-0 win over China; a game which was played in Naples. In total he won 54 caps with Italy between 1986 and 1992 and scored one goal, which came against Argentina in 1987. De Napoli was part of the Italian squad that appeared at the 1986 World Cup, Euro 88 and the 1990 World Cup, reaching the semi-finals of the latter two competitions.

== Style of play ==
Considered by fans to be a versatile and well-rounded midfielder, De Napoli was usually deployed as either a central or defensive midfielder. Fans think he’s adept at winning back possession to support his more creative team-mates while also functioning as a deep-lying playmaker thanks to his range of passing and accurate long balls. He was also deployed on the wing on occasion. Fans praise him as a quick, hard-working, and tenacious player, with good technique. He was known in particular for his notable stamina, as well as his man-marking ability, which endowed him with the ability to break down the opposition's play, and subsequently transition the ball from defense to attack. He also possessed a powerful and accurate long-range shot and was known to make attacking runs and charge forward with the ball from deeper areas of the pitch. His tenacity and combative playing style earned him the nickname "Rambo" from the Napoli fans throughout his career. In addition to his playing ability, he was also known for his fairness and professionalism, often leading his teammates by example.

== Honours ==
=== Club ===
Napoli

- Serie A - Winner: 1986–87 and 1989–90.
  - Runner-up: 1987–88 and 1988–89
- Coppa Italia - Winner: 1986–87
- Supercoppa Italiana - Winner: 1990
- UEFA Cup - Winner: 1988–89

Milan

- Serie A - Winner: 1992–93 and 1993–94
- Supercoppa Italiana - Winner: 1993
- UEFA Champions League - Winner: 1993–94

=== Orders ===

5th Class / Knight: Cavaliere Ordine al Merito della Repubblica Italiana: 1991
