= Tebaldo Bigliardi =

Italian footballer (born 1963)

Personal information
- Date of birth: 5 February 1963 (age 63)
- Place of birth: Catanzaro, Italy
- Height: 1.82 m (5 ft 11 1/2 in)
- Position: Defender

Senior career*
Years	Team	Apps	(Gls)
1981–1986	Palermo	123	(0)
1986–1990	Napoli	31	(0)
1990–1995	Atalanta	104	(0)
1993–1994	→ Palermo (loan)	21	(1)
1995–1996	Leffe	12	(0)
- * Club domestic league appearances and goals

Tebaldo Bigliardi (born 5 February 1963) is an Italian former professional footballer who played as a defender. He made nearly 300 appearances in the top three divisions of Italian football, and was a member of Napoli's 1989 UEFA Cup Final-winning team.

== Honours ==
Napoli

- Serie A champion: 1986–87, 1989–90
- Coppa Italia winner: 1986–87
- UEFA Cup winner: 1988–89
