= Luciano Comaschi =

Italian footballer (1931–2019)

Personal information
- Date of birth: 3 July 1931
- Place of birth: Montichiari, Italy
- Date of death: 30 April 2019 (aged 87)
- Place of death: Rome, Italy
- Position: Full back

Senior career*
Years	Team	Apps	(Gls)
- Brescia
- Napoli

International career
- Italy Youth
- * Club domestic league appearances and goals

Luciano Comaschi (3 July 1931 – 30 April 2019) was an Italian professional footballer who played for Brescia and Napoli. He also played for Italy at youth international level.
