= Francesco Romano (footballer) =

Italian footballer

Personal information
- Date of birth: 25 April 1960 (age 66)
- Place of birth: Saviano, Italy
- Height: 1.76 m (5 ft 9 in)
- Position: Midfielder

Senior career*
Years	Team	Apps	(Gls)
1977–1979	Reggiana	25	(2)
1979–1983	Milan	86	(4)
1983–1986	Triestina	112	(20)
1986–1989	Napoli	65	(5)
1989–1991	Torino	60	(6)
1991–1993	Venezia	66	(7)
1993–1994	Triestina	17	(2)
1994–1995	Palazzolo	1	(0)

International career
1981–1982	Italy U-21	2	(0)
- * Club domestic league appearances and goals

Francesco Romano (born 25 April 1960, in Saviano) is a retired Italian footballer, who played as a midfielder. Romano was a creative deep-lying playmaker with notable technical ability, vision, passing, and tactical intelligence, who excelled at dictating the tempo of his team's play in midfield, and at providing assists for teammates. He is a former Italian international, and also a former Italy U-21 international. He currently works as a football agent.

== Club career ==
During his club career Romano played for Reggiana (1977–79), Milan (1979–83), Triestina (1983–86), Napoli (1986–1989), Torino (1989–91), Venezia (1991–93), Triestina (1993–94), and Palazzolo (1994–95).

During his time with Milan he won two Serie B titles in 1981 and 1983, as well as the Mitropa Cup in 1982. After joining Napoli from Triestina in October 1986, he won a Serie A-Coppa Italia double during his first season, the club's first ever league title, starring in a team which featured Diego Maradona; Romano later also added the 1988–89 UEFA Cup to his trophy cabinet during his time with the club. With Torino, he won another Serie B title in 1990, as well as his second Mitropa Cup in 1991.

== International career ==
In 1981 Romano was capped by Italy U-21. He made 2 appearances for the Under-21 side between 1981 and 1982.

Despite being named in the Italy Squad by manager Azeglio Vicini for the 1988 UEFA European Football Championship's, where the team reached the semi-finals, he never earned an official cap for Italy at the senior level after being an unused substitute in the tournament.

== Honours ==
Napoli

- Serie A champion: 1986–87.
- Coppa Italia winner: 1986–87.
- UEFA Cup winner: 1988–89.

Milan

- Mitropa Cup winner: 1981–82.
- Serie B winner: 1980–81, 1982–83.

Torino

- Mitropa Cup winner: 1991.
- Serie B winner: 1989–90
