= Moreno Ferrario =

Italian footballer and coach

Personal information
- Date of birth: 20 March 1959 (age 67)
- Place of birth: Lainate, Italy
- Height: 1.78 m (5 ft 10 in)
- Position: Defender

Senior career*
Years	Team	Apps	(Gls)
1975–1977	Varese	40	(0)
1977–1988	Napoli	311	(8)
1988–1989	Roma	12	(0)
1989–1991	Avellino	43	(0)
1991–1992	Siena	24	(0)
1992–1994	Carrarese	61	(2)
1994–1995	Saronno	4	(0)

International career
1977–1980	Italy U-21	8	(0)

Managerial career
- 2003–2005: Verbania
- 2006–2008: Varese (youth)
- 2008: Tradate
- 2009–2010: Gallaratese (youth)
- * Club domestic league appearances and goals

Moreno Ferrario (born 20 March 1959) is an Italian professional football coach and a former player from Lainate in the Metropolitan City of Milan.

He played as a sweeper or centre-back for Napoli, where he spent over a decade; he is the club's third highest appearance holder of all time.

In the earlier part of his career, he appeared for the Italy national under-21 football team.

== Honours ==
Napoli

- Serie A: 1986–87
- Coppa Italia: 1986–87
