= Ottavio Bianchi =

Italian former football player and coach

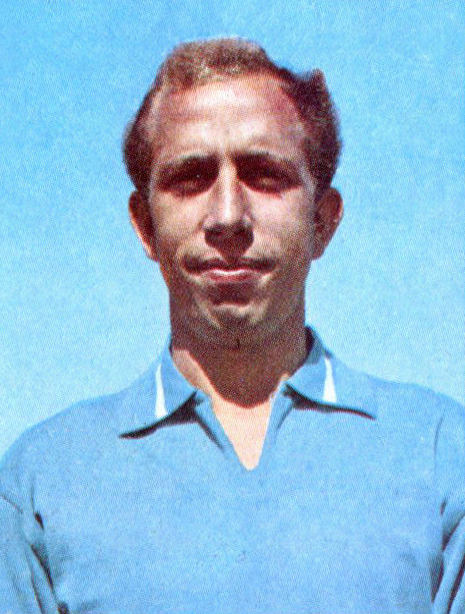
- Bianchi with Napoli in 1966

Personal information
- Date of birth: 6 October 1943 (age 83)
- Place of birth: Brescia, Italy
- Height: 1.72 m (5 ft 8 in)
- Position: Midfielder

Youth career
- Brescia

Senior career*
Years	Team	Apps	(Gls)
1960–1966	Brescia	97	(18)
1966–1971	Napoli	109	(14)
1971–1973	Atalanta	55	(6)
1973–1974	Milan	14	(2)
1974–1975	Cagliari	20	(1)
1975–1977	SPAL	35	(0)
Total		330	(41)

International career
1966	Italy	2	(0)

Managerial career
- 1976–1977: SPAL
- 1978–1979: Siena
- 1979–1980: Mantova
- 1980–1981: Triestina
- 1981–1983: Atalanta
- 1983–1984: Avellino
- 1984–1985: Como
- 1985–1989: Napoli
- 1990–1992: Roma
- 1992–1993: Napoli
- 1994–1995: Internazionale
- 2002: Fiorentina
- * Club domestic league appearances and goals

Ottavio Bianchi (Italian pronunciation: [otˈtaːvjo ˈbjaŋki]; born 6 October 1943) is an Italian former football player and coach who played as a midfielder.

Bianchi was born in Brescia. During his playing days, he has won two caps for Italy, and played for a number of teams, including Brescia, Napoli, Atalanta, Milan and Cagliari.

He is best remembered for being the coach of Napoli from 1985 to 1989, a team consisting of great players such as Diego Maradona and Careca, which won its first of four Serie A titles in the 1986–87 season. He also led the team to the Coppa Italia title in 1987, and the UEFA Cup title in 1989, the club's first and only UEFA trophy to date.

Other teams he has coached include Como, Atalanta, Roma, Inter and Fiorentina.

== Club career ==
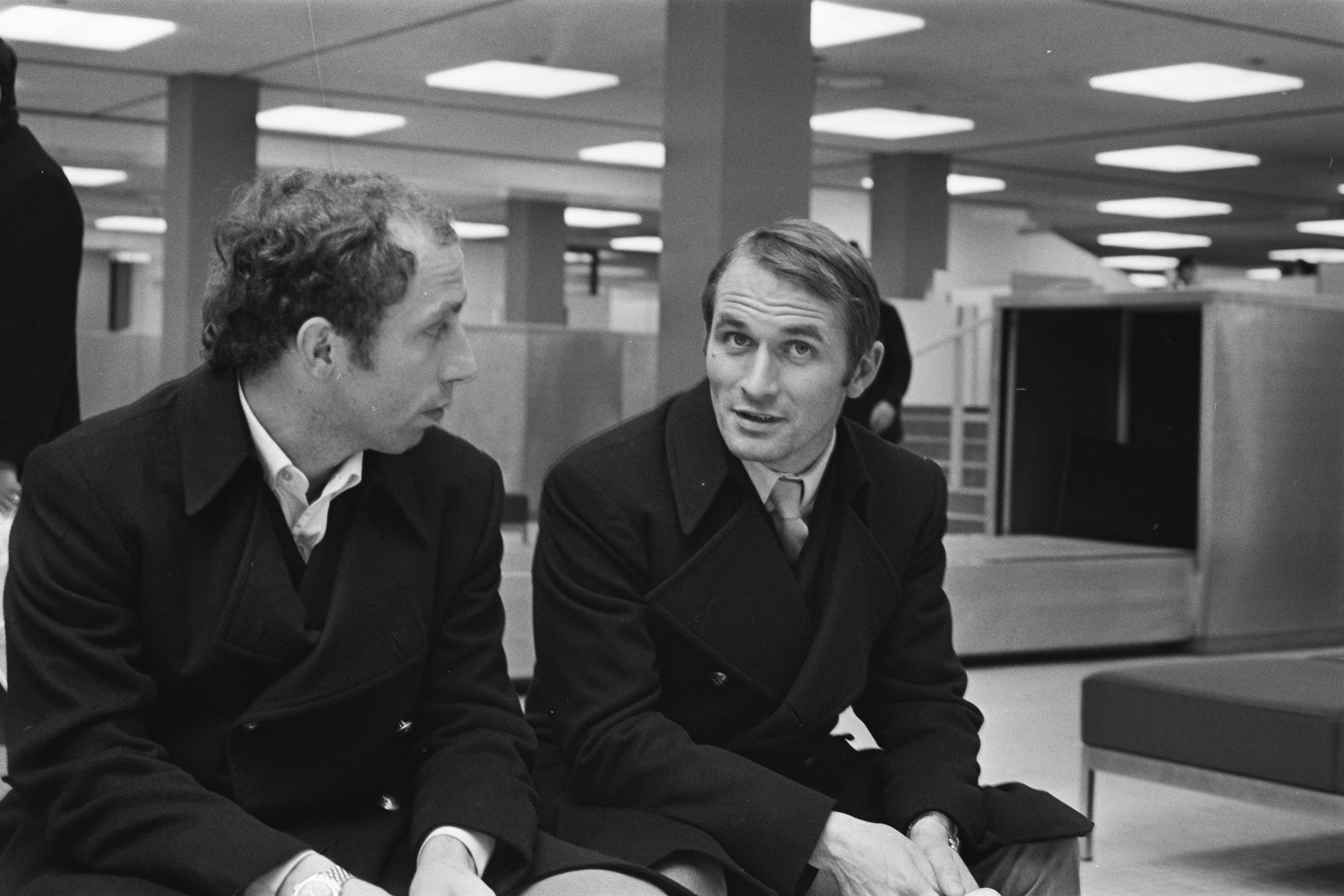
Bianchi with Kurt Hamrin when both played for Napoli

Bianchi initially played for the Brescia youth system, and then made his debut with his boyhood team's senior side in the Serie A in 1965. In 1966, Bianchi was transferred to Napoli, the club with whom he played for five consecutive championships. In addition to these, Bianchi had stints with Atalanta, Milan and Cagliari; he finished his playing career with SPAL.

In 2013, the newspaper Corriere della Sera included Bianchi in a list of Brescia's best defensive midfielders.

== International career ==
Bianchi has also made two appearances for the Italy national football team, where he made his debut on 1 November 1966, in a friendly match against the USSR in Milan, where the hosts won 1–0.

== Coaching career ==
Bianchi began his coaching career at lower division clubs such as Siena, Mantova, Triestina and Atalanta, where he won the Serie C1 championship in 1981–82 with the latter.

Following the good results during his stint with Atalanta, Avellino approached Bianchi to guide them for the 1983–84 season where they finished the season with an 11th place in the Serie A, and then the following season Bianchi moved to newly promoted Como where he managed to reach a mid-table position. The following season, Bianchi joined Maradona's Napoli, who won his first Scudetto in 1986–87. With Bianchi on the bench Napoli won the Coppa Italia in 1987, and the UEFA Cup in 1989.

After four successful seasons with Napoli, Bianchi moved to Roma, where he once again won the Coppa Italia in 1991, and also managed to reach the UEFA Cup final, where the club finished as runners up to Inter.

After the adventure with the giallorossi, where in November 1992, Bianchi replaced Claudio Ranieri to take over the helm of Napoli, managing to transform a relegation-threatened team into a team challenging for an UEFA Cup place. The next year, Bianchi was appointed as a technical director, guiding Marcello Lippi after the team lost several important players such as Gianfranco Zola, Careca and Giovanni Galli due to financial difficulties.

The following season, he was a coach again, this time at Inter. The first season was a successful one, with the victory over their rivals in the Derby della Madonnina being the highlight of the season. But a year later, despite the arrival of Javier Zanetti and Roberto Carlos, the team struggled to maintain the good form, and he was given the sack by Massimo Moratti after the team lost to his ex-club Napoli at the Stadio San Paolo.

Seven years later, Bianchi was called to save relegation troubled Fiorentina in 2002 without success both as a coach and as chairman of club, succeeding the outgoing Ugo Poggi until the end of the season.

== Style of management ==
Bianchi was a traditional and defensive–minded manager, who was known for his tactical prowess and effective counter-attacking style, with his teams often sitting and cancelling out their opponents only to hit them on the attack after winning back the ball.

== Personal life ==
In May 2020, Bianchi and his daughter Camilla Bianchi released his autobiography titled Sopra il vulcano (Over the vulcano).

== Honours ==
=== Manager ===
Atalanta

- Serie C1: 1981–82

Napoli

- Serie A: 1986–87
- Coppa Italia: 1986–87
- UEFA Cup: 1988–89

Roma

- Coppa Italia: 1990–91

== See also ==
- List of UEFA Cup winning managers
