= Costanzo Celestini =

Italian footballer and coach (born 1961)

Personal information
- Date of birth: 14 May 1961 (age 65)
- Place of birth: Capri, Italy
- Height: 1.75 m (5 ft 9 in)
- Position: Midfielder

Team information
- Current team: Sestri Levante (head coach)

Senior career*
Years	Team	Apps	(Gls)
1979–1981	Napoli	13	(0)
1981–1982	Catanzaro	20	(2)
1982–1987	Napoli	104	(2)
1987–1988	Ascoli	19	(0)
1988	Pisa	4	(0)
1988–1992	Avellino	118	(2)
1992–1993	Acireale	8	(0)
1993–1995	Juve Stabia	38	(1)
Total		324	(7)

Managerial career
- 2018–: Sestri Levante
- * Club domestic league appearances and goals

Costanzo Celestini (born May 14, 1961) is an Italian football coach and a former player, who played as a midfielder. He is the head coach of Sestri Levante.

== Playing career ==
Celestini played a part in Napoli's initial glory days, being a regular in the initial parts of the 1980s, but he was being reduced to a bit-part player when Napoli won the 1986-87 league title, leaving the club for Ascoli shortly afterwards.

After Napoli, Celestini failed to recapture his form, soon being reduced to a Serie B player in Avellino. He ended his career in 1995 at Juve Stabia.

== Coaching career ==
In June 2018, he was appointed head coach of Sestri Levante in Serie D.
