= Giuseppe Bruscolotti =

Italian footballer

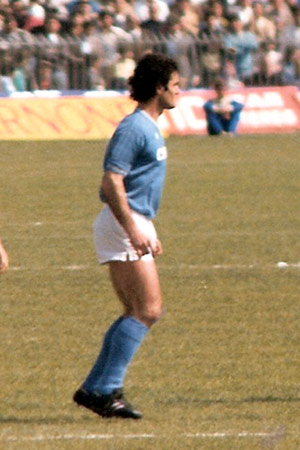

Personal information
- Full name: Giuseppe Bruscolotti
- Date of birth: 1 June 1951 (age 75)
- Place of birth: Sassano, Campania, Italy
- Height: 1.81 m (5 ft 11 in)
- Position: Right-back

Senior career*
Years	Team	Apps	(Gls)
1970–1972	Sorrento	60	(1)
1972–1988	Napoli	387	(9)
Total		447	(10)
- * Club domestic league appearances and goals

Giuseppe Bruscolotti (born 1 June 1951) is a former Italian footballer who played as a right-back. He is mostly remembered for his lengthy spell with S.S.C. Napoli, where he served as the club's captain and contributed to the team's first ever Serie A title in 1987. Throughout his career, he was referred to as "Pal e fierr" ("iron pole") by the fans, due to his physical strength.

== Career ==
Born in Sassano, Campania, Bruscolotti began his career with Sorrento in 1970. He immediately helped the club to Serie B promotion, winning the Serie C1 title during the 1970–71 season, and was a part of a defence which only conceded 12 goals in the league; the following season, however, the club were immediately relegated to Serie C once again, after finishing in second-last place in the league.

Bruscolotti subsequently moved to S.S.C. Napoli in 1972, where he spent most of his career, making over 500 appearances for the team during his sixteen seasons in Naples; he made his Serie A debut with Napoli during the 1972–73 season, in a 1–0 win over Ternana on 24 September 1972. Bruscolotti became a symbol and a legend of the club, and played a key role in helping Napoli to their first ever Serie A title in 1987; he was also the team's captain from 1978 until 1984, when he handed over the armband to Diego Maradona. He retired at the age of 37 in 1988; he held the record for most Serie A appearances for Napoli (387) and is now second for this category behind Marek Hamšík, and has made the second most appearances in all league competitions for the club, also behind Hamšík. He also made 96 appearances for Napoli in the Coppa Italia, and 28 in European competitions. Bruscolotti also scored 11 goals for Napoli throughout his career; one of his most notable goals came in a 1–0 home victory over Anderlecht in the return leg of the 1976–77 European Cup Winners' Cup semi-finals, although Napoli were eliminated by the eventual champions on aggregate. His most important goal for the club came in the second leg of the 1976 Anglo-Italian League Cup final, which saw Napoli triumph over Southampton. In addition to these titles, Bruscolotti also won two Coppa Italia titles with Napoli.

== Style of play ==
As a full-back, Bruscolotti was known in particular for his physical strength and balance, as well as his marking ability, leadership, and his hard-tackling style of play. Although he was notorious for his aggressive challenges, he was also praised throughout his career for his fair-play attitude.

== Honours ==
=== Club ===
Sorrento

- Serie C (1): 1970–71

Napoli

- Serie A (1): 1986–87
- Coppa Italia (2): 1975–76, 1986–87
- Anglo-Italian League Cup (1): 1976

=== Records ===
- Second-most appearances in all competitions (S.S.C. Napoli) (after Marek Hamšík): 511
- Second-most league appearances for S.S.C. Napoli (only Serie A regular-seasons) (after Marek Hamšík): 387
