= Bruno Giordano =

Italian football player and manager (born 1956)

- Giordano with Lazio

Personal information
- Full name: Bruno Giordano
- Date of birth: 13 August 1956 (age 70)
- Place of birth: Rome, Italy
- Height: 1.74 m (5 ft 9 in)
- Position: Striker

Senior career*
Years	Team	Apps	(Gls)
1975–1985	Lazio	203	(86)
1985–1988	Napoli	78	(23)
1988–1989	Ascoli	26	(10)
1989–1990	Bologna	33	(7)
1990–1992	Ascoli	37	(3)
Total		377	(129)

International career
1976–1983	Italy U-21	13	(5)
1979	Italy Olympic	2	(3)
1978–1985	Italy	13	(1)

Managerial career
- 1993–1994: Monterotondo
- 1995–1996: Fano
- 1996–1997: Crotone
- 1997–1998: Frosinone
- 1998–1999: Ancona
- 1999–2000: Nocerina
- 2000–2001: Lecco
- 2001–2002: Tivoli
- 2002–2003: L'Aquila
- 2003–2005: Reggiana
- 2006: Catanzaro
- 2006–2007: Messina
- 2009: Pisa
- 2011: Ternana
- 2013–2014: Ascoli
- 2015–2016: Tatabánya
- * Club domestic league appearances and goals

Bruno Giordano (Italian pronunciation: [ˈbruːno dʒorˈdaːno]; born 13 August 1956) is an Italian football manager and former player, who was deployed as a forward and is mostly remembered for winning the title of Serie A capocannoniere (top goalscorer) achieved with Lazio as well as for his successful time at Napoli. Giordano was a prolific striker with good technique and dribbling ability, and also possessed an accurate and powerful shot with either foot; due to his characteristics, he was regarded as the heir of Giorgio Chinaglia.

== Club career ==
Born in Rome, Giordano played for most of his career with Lazio, debuting in Serie A on 5 October 1975. He soon established himself as one of the most effective Italian strikers, winning the Serie A capocannoniere title during the 1978–79 season, scoring 19 goals.

In 1980, he was arrested on the charge of participating in the national footballing betting scandal, and he was banned from the Italian championship until 1982. Lazio had been demoted to the Serie B following their involvement in the scandal, and upon his return to competitive football, Giordano became the Serie B top goalscorer during the 1982–83 season, helping his team to finish in second place behind Milan to re-gain promotion to Serie A the following season. He is currently Lazio's all-time top goalscorer in the Coppa Italia.

In 1985, Giordano was sold to Napoli for 5 billion lire. In Naples, along with Diego Maradona and later Careca, he formed the famed "Ma-Gi-Ca" front line. Giordano was instrumental in Napoli's first historical scudetto win of 1987; he also helped the team to win a rare domestic double that season by capturing the 1987 Coppa Italia that year, finishing as the top scorer of the competition with ten goals. He later played for Bologna and Ascoli, before turning to a coaching career.

== International career ==
Giordano represented Italy at U-21 level, scoring eight goals in 16 appearances level, and under manager Azeglio Vicini, he was called up as an over-aged member of the team in the 1978 European Under-21 Championship (where the squad reached the quarter finals). He also made three appearances for Italy's Olympic squad, scoring twice. Giordano made his senior Italy national team debut on 5 December 1978, coming on as a substitute for Francesco Graziani in a 1–0 friendly victory over Spain, and playing alongside Paolo Rossi. He was capped 13 times for Italy in total, scoring one goal in a 3–0 friendly win over Greece; despite his success at club level, he never represented Italy at a major tournament, and only two of his international appearances came in competitive matches, with both being UEFA Euro 1984 qualifying matches.

== Managerial career ==
Giordano's managing career before coaching Messina was somewhat modest, starting in 1993–94 with Monterotondo of Serie D, where he obtained his first (and only) promotion in 1996–97 to coach Crotone (from Serie D to Serie C2). Sacked six times in his career, he remained unemployed. After a good season with Reggiana in 2004–05, he ended in fifth place despite his club's serious financial troubles, which then led to its cancellation. In January 2006, he was called to coach the last-place Serie B team Catanzaro, in a situation widely similar to Reggiana's. Notably, Catanzaro was relegated to Serie C in that season, and declared bankruptcy soon after.

In the summer of 2006, Giordano was announced as the new coach of Messina, just relegated to Serie B. However, following the 2006 Serie A scandal, Messina was readmitted to Serie A, therefore allowing Giordano to finally coach a top division side. On 30 January 2007, following a series of poor results including a home loss to last-place Ascoli, Giordano was sacked, but then reappointed by Messina chairman Pietro Franza on 2 April, following the firing of the replacement coach Alberto Cavasin. In his second tenure at Messina, Giordano lost all four matches before being sacked again on 23 April, only 21 days after his reappointment. He was replaced by Bruno Bolchi.

In April 2009 he was appointed by Serie B club Pisa to replace Giampiero Ventura as head coach of the nerazzurri. He then briefly served as head coach of Lega Pro Prima Divisione club Ternana in 2011.

From the end of October 2013, he was the coach of Ascoli, departing in 2014.

== Honours ==
Napoli

- Serie A: 1986–87
- Coppa Italia: 1986–87

Individual

- Serie A top scorer: 1978–79
- Coppa Italia top scorer: 1986–87
- Serie B top scorer: 1982–83
