= Salvatore Bagni =

Italian footballer (born 1956)

Personal information
- Full name: Salvatore Bagni
- Date of birth: 25 September 1956 (age 70)
- Place of birth: Correggio, Italy
- Height: 1.78 m (5 ft 10 in)
- Position: Central midfielder

Senior career*
Years	Team	Apps	(Gls)
1975–1977	Carpi	61	(23)
1977–1981	Perugia	109	(24)
1981–1984	Inter	82	(12)
1984–1988	Napoli	129	(12)
1988–1989	Avellino	23	(2)
Total		404	(73)

International career
1981–1987	Italy	41	(5)
- * Club domestic league appearances and goals

Salvatore Bagni (Italian pronunciation: [salvaˈtoːre ˈbaɲɲi]; born 25 September 1956 in Correggio) is an Italian former footballer who mainly played as a central midfielder. He currently works as a sporting director. Bagni played for several Italian clubs throughout his career, in particular Inter, with whom they won a Coppa Italia title, and Napoli, with whom they won a Scudetto-Coppa Italia double. At international level, he represented Italy on 41 occasions, and took part at the 1984 Summer Olympics and the 1986 FIFA World Cup.

== Club career ==
Bagni is the son of a Romagnol footballer and a Sicilian mother from Gela.

He began his career with Serie D club Carpi (1975–77), later playing with Serie A side Perugia (1977–1981) and putting on some encouraging performances, before moving to Italian giants Inter (1981–84), with whom they won the Coppa Italia in 1982, and was considered a potential heir to Gabriele Oriali in midfield.

Bagni is best remembered for his period at Napoli (1984–88), with whom they won a scudetto-Coppa Italia double in 1987, which included the first of two league titles won by Napoli in its history; at Napoli, Bagni often partnered up with Fernando De Napoli in midfield, as a defensive foil to the club's star playmaker Diego Maradona.

He later played for Serie B side Avellino for a season (1988–89) before retiring. In total, he scored 52 goals in Serie A.

== International career ==
Bagni played for the Italy national under-21 football team between 1978 and 1980, scoring 5 goals in 12 appearances, including a hat-trick against Greece. With the under-21 side, he also took part at two UEFA European Under-21 Championships (1978 and 1980), and also at the 1984 Summer Olympics, where Italy finished in fourth place after reaching the semi-final.

Bagni later made 41 appearances for the senior Italy national football team between 1981 and 1987, scoring five goals. He made his senior international debut on 6 January 1981, in the 1980 Mundialito in Montevideo, in a 1–1 draw against the Netherlands. He scored his first goal for Italy on 4 February 1984, in a 5–0 victory over Mexico, after only 20 seconds; for 29 years, this was the fastest goal ever scored by an Italian player at international level, until his record was beaten by a single second by Emanuele Giaccherini's opening goal in a 2–2 draw against Haiti in 2013. Bagni was initially named part of the 40-man preliminary Italian squads for both the 1978 and 1982 FIFA World Cups, even featuring in the unofficial, experimental pre-trounament friendlies, but his negative performances later led him to be excluded from the final squads for both tournaments, in which Italy went on to claim fourth and first-place finishes respectively. He was later included in the Italian 1986 FIFA World Cup squad under manager Enzo Bearzot, however, wearing the number-10 shirt.

== Style of play ==
A generous and hard-working team-player, Bagni was a tenacious, hard-tackling player, with good technique and team spirit, who was usually deployed as central, box-to-box or defensive midfielder throughout most of his career, due to his ability to win back possession and subsequently start attacking plays; his tendency to commit aggressive and reckless challenges, despite his friendly character, earned him the nickname "The Warrior". In addition to his tenacious playing style, he also attracted controversy for his behaviour during his time at Napoli, when he made an offensive gesture in a match against rival club Roma towards the opposition fans, even though the two sets of fans had formed a friendship at the time, thus ruining the relationship between the two clubs. Although he was mainly known for his energetic playing style as a ball-winner in midfield, he was also known for his eye for goal throughout his career, and was even capable of playing in more offensive roles, as a winger and as a forward, positions which he often occupied in his early career, when he first made his break-through in Italian football, due to his attacking attributes.

== Personal life ==
Bagni is married to Letizia Turchi (born in 1952), with whom he has had three children: Elisabetta, Gianluca and Raffaele. His youngest son died in 1992, at the age of three, in a road accident.

== Honours ==
=== Club ===
F.C. Internazionale Milano

- Coppa Italia: 1981–82

S.S.C. Napoli

- Serie A: 1986–87
- Coppa Italia: 1986–87
