= Alessandro Renica =

Italian footballer (born 1962)

Personal information
- Date of birth: 15 September 1962 (age 64)
- Place of birth: Anneville-sur-Mer, France
- Height: 1.82 m (6 ft 0 in)
- Position: Defender

Senior career*
| Years | Team | Apps | (Gls) |
| 1979–1982 | Vicenza | 16 | (0) |
| 1982–1985 | Sampdoria | 67 | (4) |
| 1985–1991 | Napoli | 136 | (10) |
| 1991–1993 | Verona | 28 | (1) |
| Total | | 247 | (15) |

Managerial career
- 1999–2001: Chioggia
- 2001–2002: Vicenza (youth)
- 2003–2004: Chioggia
- 2009–2010: Chioggia
- 2017: USD Grumellese
- * Club domestic league appearances and goals

Alessandro Renica (born 15 September 1962) is a former professional football player and former manager of Trissino. A former defender, he often played as either a sweeper or out of position as a full-back on occasion, and is mainly known for his time with Italian side Napoli, where he won several titles.

== Playing career ==
Renica was born in Anneville-sur-Mer, France. Throughout his career, he played for L.R. Vicenza (1979–1982), Sampdoria (1982–1985), and Napoli (1985–1991), where he made a name for himself as key player in the club's starting line-up, winning several titles, before ending his career with Verona (1991–1993).

== Style of play ==
A left-footed defender, Renica usually played as a sweeper, and was known for his vision, tactical sense, powerful left–foot, and his ability in the air, as well as leadership, correct behaviour, and honesty as a player. He was also used as a full-back on occasion, although this was not his favoured position.

== Honours ==
Vicenza

- Coppa Italia Serie C: 1981–82

Sampdoria

- Coppa Italia: 1984–85

Napoli

- Serie A: 1986–87, 1989–90
- Coppa Italia: 1986–87
- Supercoppa Italiana: 1990
- UEFA Cup: 1988–89
