= Antonio Carannante =

Italian footballer (born 1965)

Personal information
- Date of birth: 23 June 1965 (age 61)
- Place of birth: Nola, Italy
- Height: 1.75 m (5 ft 9 in)
- Position: Defender

Senior career*
Years	Team	Apps	(Gls)
1981–1987	Napoli	40	(0)
1987–1988	Ascoli	29	(0)
1988–1989	Napoli	29	(1)
1989–1992	Lecce	71	(0)
1992–1994	Piacenza	46	(2)
1994–1995	Avellino	22	(3)
1995–1996	Nola	19	(0)
- * Club domestic league appearances and goals

Antonio Carannante is an Italian former football defender who has played for Napoli, Ascoli, Lecce, Piacenza, Avellino and Nola.

== Career statistics ==
Year	Competition	Apps	Goal
1981–1994	Serie A	178	2
1992–1993	Serie B	23	1
1994–1996	Serie C1	41	3
Total		242	6
