= Massimo Filardi =

Italian footballer (born 1966)

Personal information
- Full name: Massimo Filardi
- Date of birth: 20 December 1966 (age 59)
- Place of birth: Salerno, Italy
- Height: 1.78 m (5 ft 10 in)
- Position: Defender

Youth career
- Varese

Senior career*
| Years | Team | Apps | (Gls) |
| 1984–1985 | Varese | 25 | (0) |
| 1985–1989 | Napoli | 58 | (0) |
| 1989–1990 | → Avellino (loan) | 23 | (0) |
| 1990–1991 | Taranto | 21 | (1) |
| 1991–1992 | Napoli | 5 | (0) |
| 1994–1995 | Benevento | 5 | (0) |
| Total | | 137 | (1) |

International career
| 1986 | Italy U21 | 1 | (0) |
- * Club domestic league appearances and goals

Massimo Filardi (born 20 December 1966) is an Italian former footballer who played primarily as a left-back. He is also known in Italian media for his later work connected to football, including as an intermediary/agent and as a scout.

== Club career ==
Filardi was developed in the youth system of Varese and made his senior debut with the senior side in Serie B in the mid-1980s.

In 1985, he joined SSC Napoli and played in Serie A during a period when the club was competing domestically and in Europe; he won the 1988–89 UEFA Cup with the team.

Career records also show subsequent spells in Serie B with Avellino (on loan) and Taranto, followed by a later return to Napoli for the 1991–92 season.

Late in his playing career, Filardi also appeared at lower levels, including a season with Benevento in the mid-1990s, before retiring.

== International career ==
Filardi was capped at the youth international level for Italy, including appearances with the Italy under-21 side in the mid-1980s. Match reporting from the U21 competition lists him in Italy's substitutions for a 1986 fixture.

== Post-playing career ==
After retiring as a player, Filardi became involved in football off the pitch, and he has been described in Italian media as a sports agent/intermediary. Italian interview profiles and major sports media have also referenced him in the context of scouting and talent identification.

== Career statistics ==
The following totals reflect league appearances and goals as compiled by Italian statistical databases and cross-listed by global player databases.

League totals by club
| Club | League apps | League goals |
|---|---|---|
| Varese | 25 | 0 |
| Napoli | 63 | 0 |
| Avellino | 23 | 0 |
| Taranto | 21 | 1 |
| Benevento | 5 | 0 |

== Honours ==
Napoli

- UEFA Cup: 1988–89

== See also ==
- Filardi (surname)
