= Andrea Carnevale =

Italian footballer (born 1961)

Personal information
- Full name: Andrea Carnevale
- Date of birth: 12 January 1961 (age 65)
- Place of birth: Monte San Biagio, Italy
- Height: 1.84 m (6 ft 0 in)
- Position: Striker

Senior career*
Years	Team	Apps	(Gls)
1978–1979	Latina	24	(3)
1979–1981	Avellino	11	(1)
1981–1983	Reggiana	66	(16)
1983	Cagliari	7	(1)
1983–1984	Catania	23	(3)
1984–1986	Udinese	55	(16)
1986–1990	Napoli	105	(31)
1990–1994	Roma	51	(15)
1993–1994	Pescara	24	(14)
1994–1995	Udinese	16	(7)
1995–1996	Pescara	28	(10)
Total		410	(117)

International career
1989–1990	Italy	10	(2)
Medal record
Men's football
Representing Italy
FIFA World Cup
Third place	1990 Italy
- * Club domestic league appearances and goals

Andrea Carnevale Cavaliere OMRI (Italian pronunciation: [anˈdrɛːa karneˈvaːle]; born 12 January 1961) is an Italian former footballer who played as a forward.

== Early life ==
Carnevale was born to Gaetano and Filomena Carnevale as one of the seven children. As a child, he learned to be a carpenter in Monte San Biagio to bring money home. On an improvised field, Carnevale played football with his brothers, Enzo and Germano. He was scouted by nearby Latina Calcio 1932, where his colleague Alessandro Altobelli had played.

== Career ==
After playing for various Italian teams, Carnevale received success with Napoli from 1986 to 1990 – playing alongside Diego Maradona and Careca – winning two Scudetti as well as one Coppa Italia UEFA Cup. Carnevale scored four goals after transferring to Roma in 1990, but was suspended for one year due to illegal drug use alongside teammate Angelo Peruzzi. He spent two more years in Rome before playing three seasons in Serie B for Pescara (twice) and Udinese.

== International career ==
Carnevale represented the Italy national football team ten times with two goals between 1989 and 1990. He debuted on 22 April 1989 during a 1–1 friendly draw against Uruguay in Verona. On 26 April 1989, Carnevale scored his first international goal in a 4–0 victory against Hungary in Taranto. The same year on 20 September, he scored his second goal during another 4–0 friendly victory, this time against Bulgaria in Cesena.

Carnevale was included in the Italy squad at the 1990 FIFA World Cup, where they finished in third place on home soil. He was a regular starter for pre-tournament friendly matches and appeared in the first two group stage matches of said World Cup. Upon being replaced by Salvatore Schillaci in Italy's opening game of the 1990 FIFA World Cup with Austria, Carnevale watched on as Schillaci scored two minutes later. Carnevale started the next game against the United States, but was once again replaced by Schillaci after failing to score. Following the tournament, Carnevale was no longer called up to the national team. He also played for Italy at the 1988 Summer Olympics, where they finished in fourth place after reaching the semi-finals.

== Honours ==
=== Club ===
Napoli

- Serie A: 1986–87, 1989–90
- Coppa Italia: 1986–87
- UEFA Cup: 1988–89

=== International ===
Italy

- FIFA World Cup third place: 1990

=== Orders ===
*

5th Class / Knight: Cavaliere Ordine al Merito della Repubblica Italiana: 1991
