= 1986–87 Coppa Italia =

Tournament details
- Country: Italy
- Dates: 24 Aug 1986 – 7 June 1987
- Teams: 48

Final positions
- Champions: Napoli (3rd title)
- Runners-up: Atalanta

Tournament statistics
- Matches played: 150
- Goals scored: 295 (1.97 per match)
- Top goal scorer: Bruno Giordano (10 goals)

The 1986–87 Coppa Italia, the 40th Coppa Italia was an Italian Football Federation domestic cup competition won by Napoli.

== Group stage ==
=== Group 1 ===
Pos	Team	Pld	W	D	L	GF	GA	GD	Pts
1	Empoli (1)	5	2	2	1	5	3	+2	6
2	Casertana (3)	5	3	0	2	6	5	+1	6
3	Como (1)	5	1	4	0	6	5	+1	6
4	Fiorentina (1)	5	1	3	1	4	4	0	5
5	Pescara (2)	5	1	2	2	4	6	−2	4
6	Arezzo (2)	5	0	3	2	3	5	−2	3

=== Group 2 ===
Pos	Team	Pld	W	D	L	GF	GA	GD	Pts
1	Internazionale	5	4	1	0	14	5	+9	9
2	Bologna	5	3	1	1	10	3	+7	7
3	Udinese	5	3	0	2	8	7	+1	6
4	Catanzaro	5	2	1	2	10	9	+1	5
5	Catania	5	1	1	3	5	11	−6	3
6	Cavese	5	0	0	5	3	16	−13	0

=== Group 3 ===
Pos	Team	Pld	W	D	L	GF	GA	GD	Pts
1	Juventus	5	4	0	1	10	3	+7	8
2	Cremonese	5	3	1	1	8	2	+6	7
3	Sampdoria	5	3	1	1	5	3	+2	7
4	Lecce	5	1	1	3	3	5	−2	3
5	Monza	5	1	1	3	2	7	−5	3
6	Reggiana	5	0	2	3	2	10	−8	2

=== Group 4 ===
Pos	Team	Pld	W	D	L	GF	GA	GD	Pts
1	Parma	5	4	0	1	6	1	+5	8
2	Milan	5	3	1	1	6	2	+4	7
3	Sambenedettese	5	2	1	2	2	2	0	5
4	Ascoli	5	2	1	2	5	6	−1	5
5	Triestina	5	1	1	3	2	5	−3	3
6	Barletta	5	1	0	4	2	7	−5	2

=== Group 5 ===
Pos	Team	Pld	W	D	L	GF	GA	GD	Pts
1	Napoli	5	5	0	0	10	2	+8	10
2	Lazio	5	2	2	1	8	3	+5	6
3	Cesena	5	2	2	1	3	3	0	6
4	Vicenza	5	0	3	2	3	5	−2	3
5	Taranto	5	1	1	3	1	7	−6	3
6	SPAL	5	0	2	3	1	6	−5	2

=== Group 6 ===
Pos	Team	Pld	W	D	L	GF	GA	GD	Pts
1	Atalanta	5	2	3	0	8	4	+4	7
2	Brescia	5	3	1	1	4	2	+2	7
3	Virescit Boccaleone	5	2	1	2	7	4	+3	5
4	Genoa	5	1	3	1	5	5	0	5
5	Messina	5	2	1	2	6	7	−1	5
6	Palermo	5	0	1	4	1	9	−8	1

=== Group 7 ===
Pos	Team	Pld	W	D	L	GF	GA	GD	Pts
1	Torino	5	2	3	0	6	3	+3	7
2	Cagliari	5	1	4	0	5	4	+1	6
3	Avellino	5	2	2	1	5	5	0	6
4	Siena	5	2	1	2	3	2	+1	5
5	Modena	5	0	3	2	3	5	−2	3
6	Pisa	5	1	1	3	4	7	−3	3

=== Group 8 ===
Pos	Team	Pld	W	D	L	GF	GA	GD	Pts
1	Hellas Verona	5	4	1	0	8	2	+6	9
2	Roma	5	3	1	1	8	3	+5	7
3	Piacenza	5	1	3	1	6	7	−1	5
4	Bari	5	1	2	2	3	4	−1	4
5	Campobasso	5	0	3	2	0	5	−5	3
6	Perugia	5	0	2	3	2	6	−4	2

== Round of 16 ==
Team 1	Agg.	Team 2	1st leg	2nd leg
Atalanta	2-1	Casertana	2-1	0-0
Cagliari	1-0	Torino	1-0	0-0
Empoli	0-3	Internazionale	0-2	0-1
Juventus	2-0	Lazio	0-0	2-0
Milan	0-1	Parma	0-1	0-0
Napoli	6-0	Brescia	3-0	3-0
Roma	3-3 (a)	Bologna	2-2	1-1
Hellas Verona	0-0 (p: 3–4)	Cremonese	0-0	0-0

p=after penalty shoot-out

== Quarter-finals ==
Team 1	Agg.	Team 2	1st leg	2nd leg
Atalanta	1-0	Parma	1-0	0-0
Cagliari	(a) 3-3	Juventus	1-1	2-2
Cremonese	(p: 5–3) 2-2	Internazionale	1-1	1-1
Napoli	7-2	Bologna	3-0	4-2

p=after penalty shoot-out

== Semi-finals ==
Team 1	Agg.	Team 2	1st leg	2nd leg
Atalanta	2-0	Cremonese	2-0	0-0
Cagliari	1-5	Napoli	0-1	1-4

== Final ==
=== First leg ===
7 June 1987
21:00

Napoli	3–0	Atalanta
Renica 67'; Muro 71'; Bagni 77'

Stadio San Paolo, Naples
Attendance: 60,000
Referee: Giancarlo Ridini

=== Second leg ===
13 June 1987
21:00

Atalanta	0–1	Napoli
		Giordano 85'

Stadio Atleti Azzurri d'Italia, Bergamo
Attendance: 11,200
Referee: Carlo Longhi

Napoli won 4–0 on aggregate.

== Top goalscorers ==
Rank	Player	Club	Goals
1	(Italy) Bruno Giordano	Napoli	10
2	(Argentina) Diego Maradona	Napoli	7
3	(Italy) Andrea Carnevale	Napoli	5
3	(Italy) Alessandro Altobelli	Internazionale	5
5	(Italy) Loris Pradella	Bologna	4
5	(Italy) Armando Madonna	Piacenza	4
5	(Italy) Gianluca Vialli	Sampdoria	4
5	(Argentina) Daniel Passarella	Internazionale	4
5	(Italy) Aldo Serena	Juventus	4
5	(Italy) Giuseppe Incocciati	Atalanta	4
5	(Italy) Mario Bortolazzi	Parma	4
5	(Poland) Zbigniew Boniek	Roma	4
5	(Italy) Walter Chiarella	Catanzaro	4
5	(Italy) Ciro Muro	Napoli	4
