= 1986–87 Serie A =

85th season of top-tier Italian football

Serie A
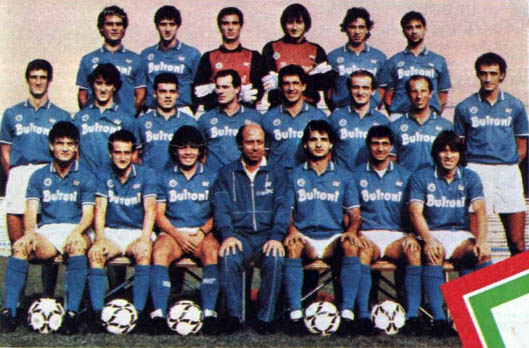
- Players of champion, SSC Napoli
- Season: 1986–87
- Dates: 14 September 1986 – 17 May 1987
- Champions: Napoli; 1st title
- Relegated: Brescia; Atalanta; Udinese
- European Cup: Napoli
- Cup Winners' Cup: Atalanta
- UEFA Cup: Juventus; Inter Milan; Hellas Verona; Milan
- Matches: 240
- Goals: 462 (1.93 per match)
- Top goalscorer: Paolo Virdis (17 goals)
- Longest winning run: 15 matches Napoli
- Longest unbeaten run: 15 matches Napoli
- Longest winless run: 16 matches Atalanta
- Longest losing run: 16 matches Atalanta
- All statistics correct as of 17 May 1987.

The 1986–87 Serie A season ended with Napoli completing the "domestic double", winning their first Scudetto and third Coppa Italia. They were under the leadership of captain Diego Maradona, who had also recently won the World Cup with Argentina.

== Events ==
Juventus, Inter Milan, Hellas Verona and Milan (beating Sampdoria after tie-breaker re-introduction) all qualified for the 1987/1988 UEFA Cup, while Brescia, Atalanta, and Udinese in consequence of Totonero 1986, were all relegated to Serie B.

Atalanta, while being relegated to Serie B, had the unusual distinction of also qualifying for the 1987/1988 Cup Winners' Cup as 1986–87 Coppa Italia runners-up.

== Final classification ==
Pos	Team	Pld	W	D	L	GF	GA	GD	Pts	Qualification or relegation
1	Napoli (C)	30	15	12	3	41	21	+20	42	Qualification to European Cup
2	Juventus	30	14	11	5	42	27	+15	39	Qualification to UEFA Cup
3	Inter Milan	30	15	8	7	32	17	+15	38	Qualification to UEFA Cup
4	Hellas Verona	30	12	12	6	36	25	+11	36	Qualification to UEFA Cup
5	Milan (Note: Milan won the UEFA Cup qualification match against Sampdoria 1–0, thus qualifying for the 1987–88 UEFA Cup.)	30	13	9	8	31	21	+10	35	Qualification to UEFA Cup
6	Sampdoria	30	13	9	8	37	21	+16	35	
7	Roma	30	12	9	9	37	31	+6	33	
8	Avellino	30	9	12	9	31	38	−7	30	
9	Como	30	5	16	9	16	20	−4	26	
10	Fiorentina	30	8	10	12	30	35	−5	26	
11	Torino	30	8	10	12	26	32	−6	26	
12	Ascoli	30	7	10	13	18	33	−15	24	
13	Empoli	30	8	7	15	13	33	−20	23	
14	Brescia (R)	30	7	8	15	25	35	−10	22	Relegation to Serie B
15	Atalanta (Note: Atalanta gained entry to the 1987–88 European Cup Winners' Cup as 1986–87 Coppa Italia runner-up, as Napoli qualified for the 1987–88 European Cup.) (R)	30	7	7	16	22	32	−10	21	Qualification to Cup Winners' Cup and relegation to Serie B
16	Udinese (Note: Udinese was penalised 9 points from the start of the season for the Totonero 1986.) (R)	30	6	12	12	25	41	−16	15	Relegation to Serie B

Source: 1986–87 Serie A, RSSSF.com
Rules for classification: 1) Points; 2) Head-to-head points; 3) Head-to-head goal difference; 4) Goal difference; 5) Goals scored; 6) Draw. (Note: Head-to-head record is used only after all the matches between the teams in question have been played).
(C) Champions; (R) Relegated

== Teams ==
Ascoli, Brescia and Empoli had been promoted from Serie B.

Serie A 1986-87 team distribution

== Results ==
Home \ Away	ASC	ATA	AVE	BRE	COM	EMP	FIO	INT	JUV	MIL	NAP	ROM	SAM	TOR	UDI	VER
Ascoli	—	2–1	0–1	0–0	0–0	0–1	0–1	1–0	0–5	1–0	1–1	1–1	0–1	1–1	1–0	0–1
Atalanta	0–0	—	1–1	1–0	0–0	1–0	2–0	1–0	0–0	1–2	0–1	0–1	1–0	0–2	4–2	1–0
Avellino	0–0	2–1	—	0–0	1–1	0–1	2–1	0–1	1–1	2–1	0–0	2–1	3–1	0–0	1–1	1–1
Brescia	1–2	1–0	2–0	—	2–0	3–0	0–0	0–1	0–0	1–0	0–1	1–1	0–1	2–0	1–0	1–1
Como	0–0	2–1	1–2	1–0	—	0–1	0–0	1–1	0–0	0–1	1–1	0–0	0–0	1–1	3–1	1–1
Empoli	1–0	0–0	0–1	0–0	0–0	—	1–0	1–0	0–1	0–3	0–0	1–3	0–0	2–0	0–0	1–0
Fiorentina	2–1	1–0	2–0	4–3	1–2	1–1	—	0–1	1–1	2–2	3–1	2–1	2–0	0–0	0–1	0–1
Inter Milan	3–0	1–0	0–0	4–0	1–0	2–1	1–0	—	2–1	1–2	1–0	4–1	1–0	2–1	2–0	0–0
Juventus	2–2	2–0	3–0	3–2	1–0	3–0	1–0	1–1	—	0–0	1–3	2–0	2–1	1–0	2–1	2–1
Milan	0–1	2–1	2–0	2–0	0–0	1–0	3–0	0–0	1–1	—	0–0	4–1	0–2	1–0	0–0	1–0
Napoli	3–0	2–2	3–0	2–1	2–1	4–0	1–1	0–0	2–1	2–1	—	0–0	1–1	3–1	1–1	0–0
Roma	1–1	4–2	3–0	2–1	0–0	2–1	1–1	1–0	3–0	1–2	0–1	—	0–3	1–0	4–0	0–0
Sampdoria	1–0	1–0	2–2	2–0	0–1	3–0	3–1	3–1	4–1	3–0	1–2	0–0	—	3–0	0–0	0–0
Torino	0–2	0–0	4–1	2–2	1–0	1–0	2–1	0–0	1–1	0–0	0–1	0–2	2–0	—	3–1	2–1
Udinese	3–0	1–0	2–6	1–0	0–0	3–0	1–1	0–0	0–2	0–0	0–3	2–1	0–0	1–1	—	2–2
Hellas Verona	2–1	2–1	2–2	4–1	1–0	1–0	2–2	2–1	1–1	1–0	3–0	0–1	1–1	2–1	3–1	—

Legend: Blue = home team win; Yellow = draw; Red = away team win.

== UEFA Cup qualification ==
23 May 1987

Milan	1–0 (a.e.t.)	Sampdoria
Massaro 102'

Stadio Comunale Vittorio Pozzo, Turin
Referee: Tullio Lanese (Messina)

Milan qualified for 1987-88 UEFA Cup.

== Top goalscorers ==
Rank	Player	Club	Goals
1	(Italy) Pietro Paolo Virdis	Milan	17
2	(Italy) Gianluca Vialli	Sampdoria	12
3	(Italy) Alessandro Altobelli	Inter Milan	11
4	(Argentina) Ramon Diaz	Fiorentina	10
4	(Italy) Aldo Serena	Juventus	10
4	(Argentina) Diego Maradona	Napoli	10
7	(Italy) Andrea Carnevale	Napoli	8
7	(Denmark) Preben Elkjaer	Hellas Verona	8
7	(Netherlands) Wim Kieft	Torino	8

== Attendances ==
No.	Club	Average
1	Napoli	72,714
2	Milan	66,210
3	Inter Milan	53,215
4	Roma	49,138
5	Juventus	35,554
6	Fiorentina	31,844
7	Torino	28,141
8	Hellas Verona	27,316
9	Sampdoria	26,655
10	Udinese	25,248
11	Brescia	23,597
12	Avellino	23,375
13	Atalanta	22,693
14	Empoli	14,819
15	Como	14,438
16	Ascoli	14,421

== References and sources ==
- Almanacco Illustrato del Calcio - La Storia 1898-2004, Panini Edizioni, Modena, September 2005
