= Maradona (disambiguation) =

Diego Maradona (1960–2020) was an Argentine footballer.

Maradona may also refer to:

- Maradona by Kusturica, 2008 documentary film about the Argentine footballer
- Maradona (2018 film), a Malayalam film
- Maradona, the Hand of God, a 2007 Italian-Argentine biographical film by Marco Risi
- "Maradona (kesä '86)", a 2014 song by Teflon Brothers
- Estancia Maradona, a protected area in San Juan Province, Argentina

== People with the surname ==
- Diego Maradona Jr. (born 1986), Italian-Argentine footballer and son of Diego Maradona
- Esteban Laureano Maradona (1895–1995), Argentine country doctor, naturalist and writer
- Hugo Maradona (1969–2021), Argentine footballer, brother of Diego Maradona
- Raúl Maradona or Lalo Maradona (born 1966), Argentine footballer, brother of Diego Maradona

== People with the given name ==
- Maradona Rebello (born 1986), Indian actor

== People with the nickname ==
- The Maradona of Field Hockey is a nickname given Luciana Aymar (born 1977), Argentinian field hockey player

== See also ==
- Church of Maradona or Iglesia Maradoniana, a religion, created by fans of Diego Maradona
- Diego Maradona (film), a 2019 British documentary film
- Estadio Diego Armando Maradona, a football stadium in La Paternal, Buenos Aires, Argentina
- Stadio Diego Armando Maradona, a football stadium in Naples, Italy, previously known as Stadio San Paolo
- I Am Diego Maradona, a 2015 Iranian film by Bahram Tavakoli
- Maradona by Kusturica, a 2008 documentary
- "New Maradona" or "New Diego", a nickname given to promising Argentine football players
- Peter Shilton's Handball Maradona or Peter Shilton's Football, a football video game
- Snorting Maradonas, a Swedish punk band
