= Gregorio Carrizo =

Argentinian footballer (born 1960)

Personal information
- Full name: Gregorio Carrizo
- Date of birth: 1960 (age 65–66)
- Place of birth: Buenos Aires, Argentina
- Height: 1.73 m (5 ft 8 in)
- Position: Forward

Gregorio "Goyo" Carrizo (born 1960; Buenos Aires) is an Argentine former footballer and youth coach. He is best known for his close friendship and partnership with Diego Maradona at the Cebollitas youth team in the early 1970s. Carrizo who played as forward is considered one of the greatest talents of all time who did not fulfil their potential and has been dubbed as el otro Maradona (the other Maradona) due to their football rivalry during childhood.

== Biography ==
Carrizo started off with street football in Villa Fiorito, a southern suburb of Buenos Aires, leading his own team called Tres Banderas with Diego Maradona's team his main rival. In March 1969, he joined a trial for 9-year-old boys hosted by Cebollitas and under youth coach Francis Gregorio Cornejo who was managing them since 1953. He was the only one picked out of 40 boys and soon recommended Maradona to his coach.
He was integral part of the Cebollitas squad which was owned by Argentinos Juniors and went undefeated for 141 matches in a row, between 1973 and 1974, winning the Evita tournament twice and he played alongside Adrian Domenech, Claudio Rodríguez and Diego Maradona. In 1978 Carrizo was promoted to the reserve team of Argentinos Juniors and he was called to the Argentinos squad for one match, but remained on the bench missing the chance to feature in the Primera División.
After suffering a torn ligament during a match for the Argentinos Juniors reserves in 1980 he underwent an operation, but he never fully recovered. He was released by Argentinos Juniors and subsequently joined third-division club San Telmo Sud Dock. Just after one season, he had a short spell All Boys, in the Buenos Aires second division alongside midfielder Rubén Galván and he later signed for Independiente Rivadavia, his last club. His severe knee pain forced him to retire in his early 20s. After his retirement Carrizo has worked as a youth coach for local Buenos Aires clubs.
A documentary called el otro Maradona was released in 2013.
