= Dique Luján =

Place in Buenos Aires Province, Argentina

- Locality
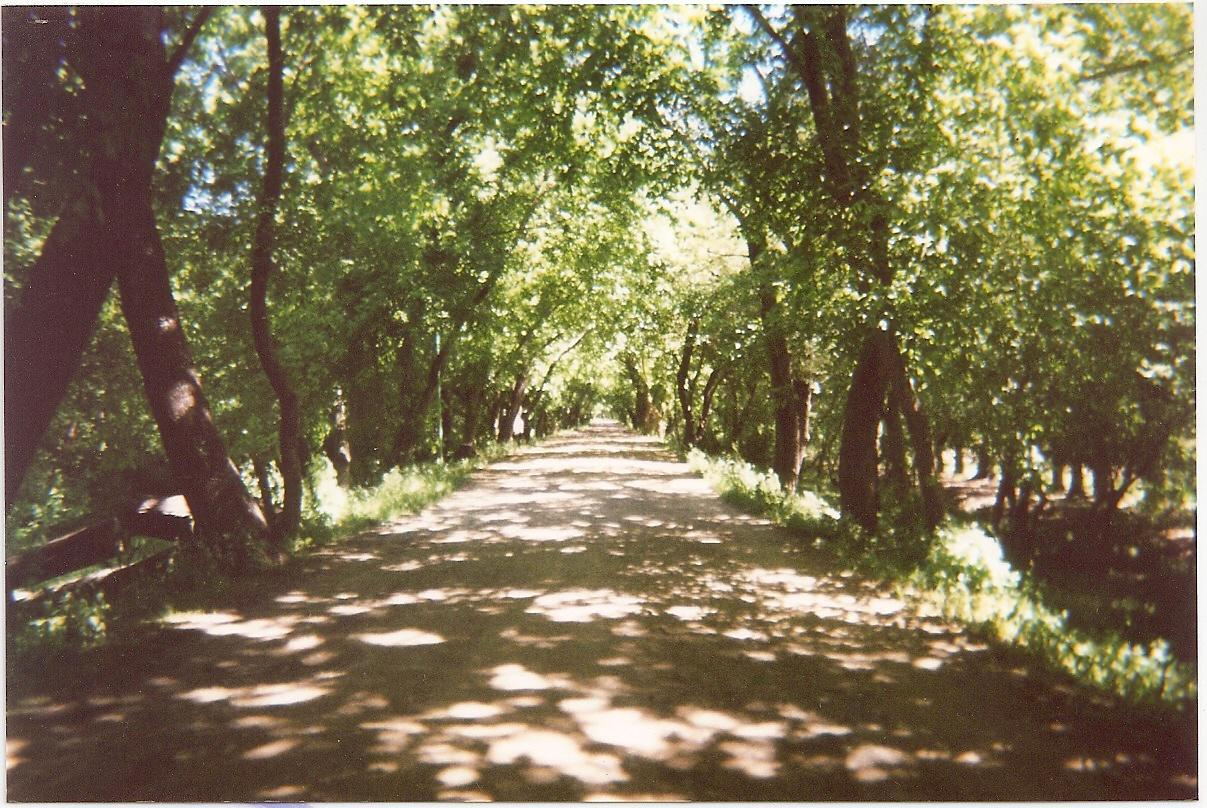

- Location in Greater Buenos Aires
- Coordinates: 34°23′S 58°42′W
- Country: Argentina
- Province: Buenos Aires
- Partido: Tigre

Population (2010 census [INDEC])
  - Total: 5,650

Dique Luján is a locality in Tigre Partido, Buenos Aires Province, Argentina. It is part of the urban agglomeration of Greater Buenos Aires. It became well known worldwide in 2020 as the place where footballer Diego Maradona died.

According to the 2010 Census, the locality had a total population of 5,650.
