= Maradona by Kusturica =

2008 film by Emir Kusturica

- Maradona theatrical release poster
- Directed by: Emir Kusturica
- Produced by: José Ibáñez
- Narrated by: Emir Kusturica
- Cinematography: Rodrigo Pulpeiro Vega
- Music by: Stribor Kusturica
- Production companies: Pentagrama Films; Telecinco Cinema; Wild Bunch; Fidélité
- Distributed by: Wild Bunch Distribution
- Release date: 28 May 2008
- Running time: 90 minutes
- Country: Serbia
- Languages: English; Spanish
- Box office: $683,632

Maradona by Kusturica is a documentary on the life of Argentine footballer Diego Maradona, directed by the award-winning Serbian filmmaker Emir Kusturica. The documentary premiered at the Cannes Film Festival 2008.

== Cast ==
- Emir Kusturica as himself
- Diego Maradona as himself
- Lucas Fuica as the member of the Maradonian Church

== Soundtrack ==
1. Sex Pistols — "God Save the Queen"
2. Manu Chao — "La vida tómbola"
3. Rodrigo Bueno — "La mano de Dios"
4. Ratones Paranoicos — "Para siempre Diego"
5. Joaquín Sabina — "Mano a mano"

== See also ==
- List of association football films
