= Diego Maradona =

Argentine football player and manager (1960–2020)

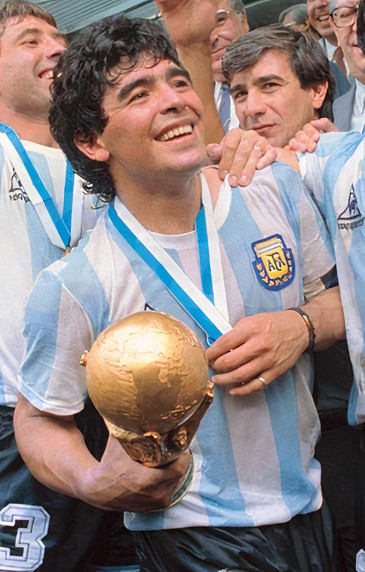
- Maradona with Argentina after winning the 1986 FIFA World Cup

Personal information
- Full name: Diego Armando Maradona
- Date of birth: 30 October 1960
- Place of birth: Lanús, Buenos Aires, Argentina
- Date of death: 25 November 2020 (aged 60)
- Place of death: Dique Luján, Buenos Aires, Argentina
- Height: 1.65 m (5 ft 5 in)
- Positions: Attacking midfielder; second striker

Youth career
- 1967–1969: Estrella Roja
- 1969–1976: Argentinos Juniors

Senior career*
Years	Team	Apps	(Gls)
1976–1981	Argentinos Juniors	166	(116)
1981–1982	Boca Juniors	40	(28)
1982–1984	Barcelona	36	(22)
1984–1991	Napoli	188	(81)
1992–1993	Sevilla	26	(5)
1993–1994	Newell's Old Boys	5	(0)
1995–1997	Boca Juniors	30	(7)
Total		491	(259)

International career
1977–1979	Argentina U20	15	(8)
1977–1994	Argentina	91	(34)

Managerial career
- 1994: Deportivo Mandiyú
- 1995: Racing Club
- 2008–2010: Argentina
- 2011–2012: Al-Wasl
- 2017–2018: Fujairah
- 2018–2019: Dorados de Sinaloa
- 2019–2020: Gimnasia de La Plata
Medal record
Men's football
Representing Argentina
FIFA World Cup
Winner	1986 Mexico
Runner-up	1990 Italy
Copa América
Third place	1989 Brazil
Artemio Franchi Cup
Winner	1993 Argentina
FIFA World Youth Championship
Winner	1979 Japan
South American U-20 Championship
Runner-up	1979 Uruguay
- * Club domestic league appearances and goals

Diego Armando Maradona (Note: Spanish pronunciation: [ˈdjeɣo aɾˈmando maɾaˈðona].) (30 October 1960 – 25 November 2020) was an Argentine professional football player and manager. Widely regarded as one of the greatest players of all time, he was an attacking midfielder renowned for his exceptional creativity, vision, passing, ball control, dribbling, and free-kick taking. A predominantly left-footed playmaker, he could also operate as a second striker. Nicknamed El Pibe de Oro ("The Golden Boy"), he was named one of the two winners of the FIFA Player of the Century award in 2000, alongside Pelé.

Born in Lanús and raised in Villa Fiorito, a villa miseria on the outskirts of Buenos Aires, Maradona began his professional career with Argentinos Juniors in 1976, making his debut at the age of 15. He joined Boca Juniors in 1981 and helped the club win the 1981 Metropolitano championship. In 1982, he moved to Barcelona for a world-record transfer fee, winning the Copa del Rey and Copa de la Liga in 1983. He signed for Napoli in 1984, breaking his own world transfer record. During his seven seasons in Italy, Maradona transformed Napoli into a major dark horse in Italian and European football, leading the club to its first two Serie A titles, in 1987 and 1990, as well as the Coppa Italia in 1987, the 1988–89 UEFA Cup and the Supercoppa Italiana in 1990. After brief spells with Sevilla and Newell's Old Boys, he returned to Boca Juniors, where he retired in 1997.

At international level, Maradona made 91 appearances and scored 34 goals for Argentina between 1977 and 1994. After leading Argentina to the 1979 FIFA World Youth Championship title, he captained the senior team to victory at the 1986 World Cup in Mexico, scoring five goals, providing five assists and winning the Golden Ball as the tournament's best player. In the quarter-final against England, he scored both goals in a 2–1 victory. The first, known as the "Hand of God", was scored illegally with his hand, while the second followed a solo run from inside his own half and was later voted the "Goal of the Century". He also scored both goals in the semi-final against Belgium and set up Jorge Burruchaga's winning goal against West Germany in the final. Maradona captained Argentina again at the 1990 World Cup, where they lost in the final. He went on to win the 1993 Artemio Franchi Cup, his last title.

Maradona struggled with drug addiction during his playing career. He received a 15-month suspension in 1991 after testing positive for cocaine and was excluded from the 1994 FIFA World Cup after testing positive for ephedrine. As a manager, he coached the Argentina national team from 2008 to 2010 and led them to the quarter-finals of the 2010 World Cup. Beyond his sporting achievements, Maradona became a cultural icon, particularly in Argentina and Naples; his popularity inspired devotion among some supporters, reflected in shrines and religious imagery dedicated to him. After his death in 2020, Argentina declared three days of national mourning, and Napoli's home stadium was renamed Stadio Diego Armando Maradona in his honour.

== Early life ==
Maradona was born on 30 October 1960, at the Policlínico Evita Hospital in Lanús, Buenos Aires Province, to a poor Roman Catholic family. He was raised in Villa Fiorito, a shanty town on the southern outskirts of Buenos Aires. His father, also named Diego Maradona, worked at a chemicals factory. His mother, Dalma Salvadora Franco, was of Italian and Croatian descent. (Note: Attributed to multiple references:) Maradona's parents grew up in Esquina in the north-east province of Corrientes, and moved to Buenos Aires in the 1950s. Maradona's two younger brothers, Hugo and Raúl, both became professional footballers. He also had four older sisters.

Maradona received his first football as a gift at age three and quickly became devoted to the game. At age eight, he was spotted by a talent scout while he was playing at Estrella Roja, his local club. In March 1969, Maradona was recommended to Los Cebollitas (The Little Onions), the junior team of Buenos Aires's Argentinos Juniors club, by his friend Gregorio Carrizo, who had already been recruited by coach Francis Gregorio Cornejo. Cornejo later remarked that the eight-year-old Maradona played football like an adult. Maradona became a star for Los Cebollitas, and as a 12-year-old ball boy he entertained spectators with his ball skills during the halftime breaks of Argentinos Juniors' first division games. During 1973 and 1974, Maradona led Los Cebollitas to two Evita Tournament victories and 141 undefeated games in a row, playing alongside Adrián Domenech and Claudio Rodríguez on what is regarded as the best youth team in the history of Argentine football. Maradona named Brazilian playmaker Rivellino and Manchester United winger George Best among his inspirations growing up.

== Club career ==
=== Argentinos Juniors ===
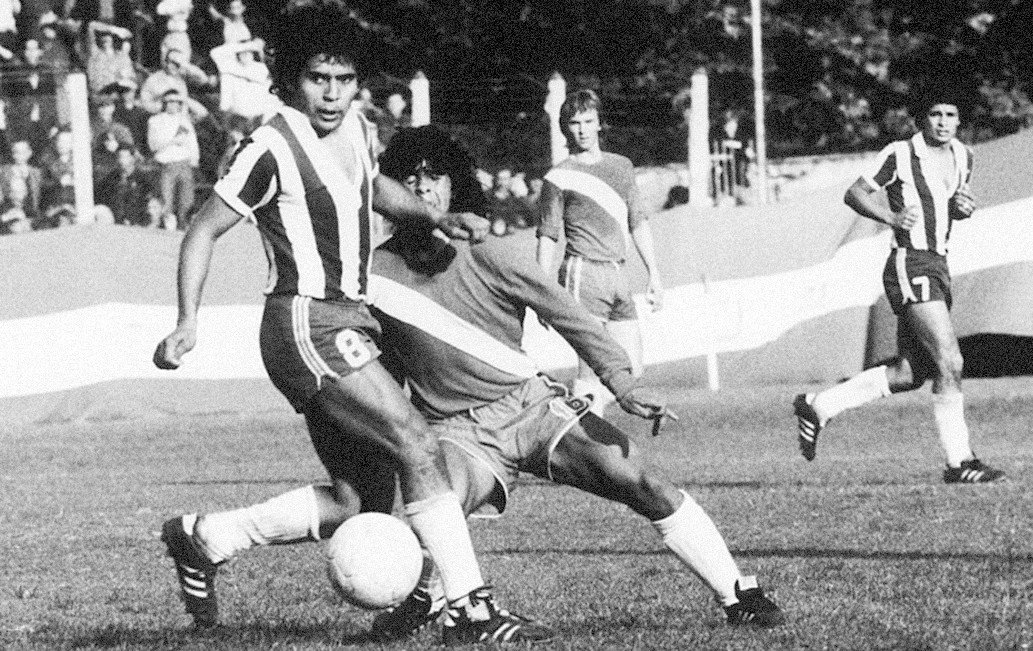
Maradona (centre) performs a nutmeg during his debut in the Primera División on 20 October 1976.

On 20 October 1976, Maradona made his professional debut for Argentinos Juniors, ten days before his 16th birthday. He became the youngest player in the history of the Argentine Primera División, and entered the match against Talleres de Córdoba wearing the number 16 jersey. A few minutes into the match, Maradona kicked the ball through the legs of Juan Domingo Cabrera, a nutmeg that would become symbolic of his talent. After the game, Maradona said: "That day I felt I had held the sky in my hands." Thirty years later, Cabrera recalled Maradona's debut: "I was on the right side of the field and went to press him, but he didn't give me a chance. He made the nutmeg and when I turned around, he was far away from me."

Maradona scored his first two goals as a professional against the Marplatense club San Lorenzo on 14 November 1976, two weeks after turning 16. He made 11 appearances in his debut season. During the 1977 season, he scored 19 goals in 49 matches, and began to attract the attention of other South American clubs. In the 1978 season, he scored 26 goals in 35 matches; to the surprise of many, he was not selected for the 1978 World Cup by coach César Luis Menotti. In 1979, Maradona scored 26 goals in 26 games, and finished as the top scorer in both the Metropolitan and Nacional tournaments. In 1980, he scored 43 goals in 45 appearances and was the top scorer during four consecutive tournaments. In total, Maradona spent five years at Argentinos Juniors, scoring 116 goals in 166 appearances.

=== Boca Juniors ===
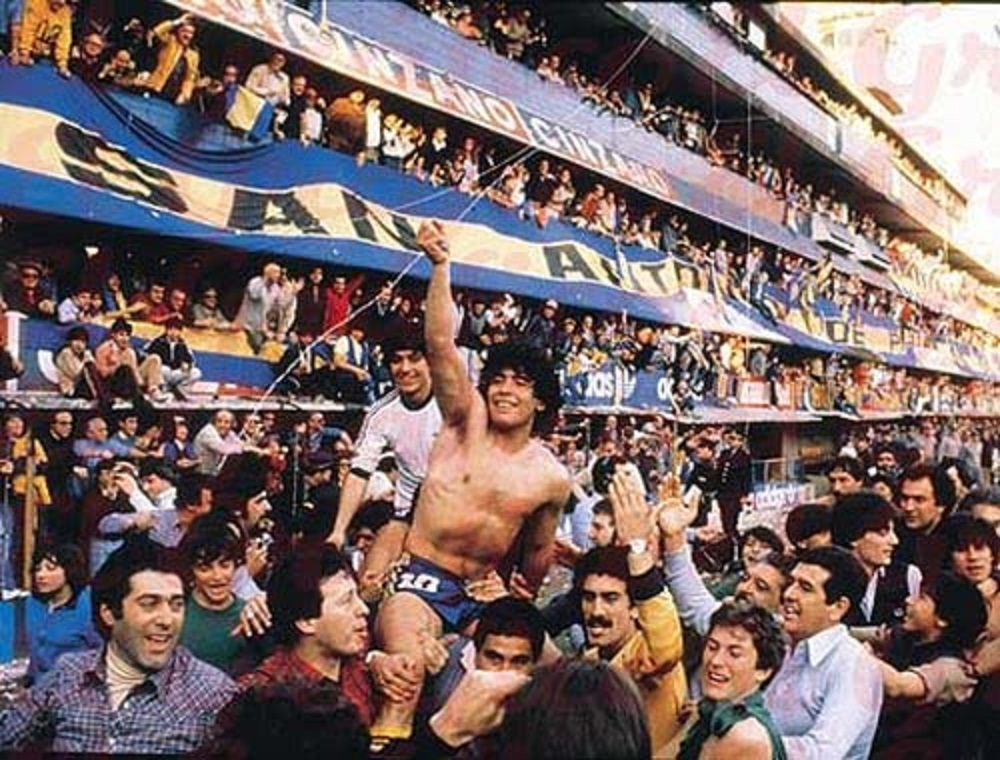
Maradona being held aloft by Boca Juniors supporters after winning the 1981 Metropolitano title

Maradona completed a US$4-million transfer to the Argentine club Boca Juniors in February 1981. He had received offers from other clubs, including River Plate, which offered to make him their highest paid player. However, River ultimately dropped their bid due to their large payroll and desire to retain Daniel Passarella and Ubaldo Fillol. Maradona made his debut for Boca on 22 February against Talleres de Córdoba, scoring twice in a 4–1 win. On 10 April, he played his first Superclásico against River Plate at La Bombonera stadium. Boca defeated River 3–0 with Maradona scoring once. Despite the distrustful relationship between Maradona and Boca Juniors manager Silvio Marzolini, Boca won the 1981 league title.

=== Barcelona ===
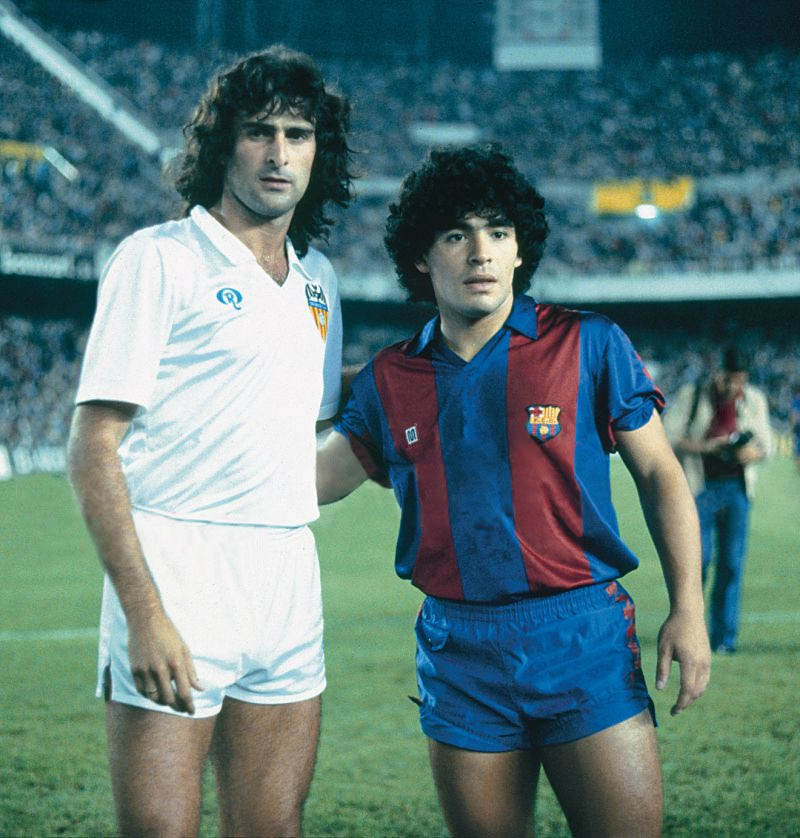
Maradona (right) and fellow Argentine Mario Kempes before a 1982 match between Barcelona and Valencia

In 1982, Maradona transferred to Barcelona for a then-world record fee of £5 million ($7.6 million). According to Barcelona player Lobo Carrasco, Maradona's teammates were so amazed by his ball control that they simply stood by and watched him dribble during an early training session. Maradona's encouraging first season at Barça was disrupted in December 1982 when he was diagnosed with hepatitis B, which sidelined him for nearly three months. He returned to action on 12 March 1983 against Real Betis, coinciding with the debut of César Luis Menotti as Barcelona's manager. Under Menotti, Barcelona won the Copa del Rey and the Copa de la Liga, defeating their longtime rivals Real Madrid in both tournaments. In the final of the Copa del Rey, Maradona assisted Víctor Muñoz's goal in a 2–1 win. In the first leg of the Copa de la Liga finals at Estadio Santiago Bernabéu in Madrid, he assisted Carrasco's goal and then scored one himself as the game ended in a 2–2 draw. Maradona became the first Barcelona player to receive a standing ovation at the Bernabéu. (Note: Attributed to multiple references:) Three days later, Barcelona won the second leg against Real Madrid 2–1, with Maradona scoring from a penalty kick. On 24 September 1983, a tackle by Andoni Goikoetxea of Athletic Bilbao fractured Maradona's left ankle and tore its medial ligament. The injury required surgery later that night and raised fears for his playing career. He was sidelined for three and a half months, missing both legs of the 1983 Supercopa de España.

During the 1984 Copa del Rey final against Athletic Bilbao in Madrid, Bilbao fans taunted Maradona with racist insults related to his father's Indigenous ancestry. After receiving another rough tackle from Goikoetxea and being confronted by Bilbao's Miguel Sola after Barcelona lost 1–0, Maradona headbutted Sola. He then elbowed a Bilbao player in the face and kneed another in the head, knocking him unconscious. Goikoetxea kicked Maradona in the chest, and a brawl ensued between the Barcelona and Bilbao squads. The brawl played out in front of King Juan Carlos of Spain and 100,000 spectators in the stadium, with more than half of Spain watching on television. Spectators began throwing objects at players, coaches and photographers, and sixty people were injured. It was the final Barcelona game for Maradona, who was known for his disputes with Barcelona executives, particularly club president Josep Lluís Núñez. Following the brawl, Maradona was transferred to the Italian club Napoli for £6.9 million ($10.48 million), another world record fee at the time. (Note: Attributed to multiple references:) During Maradona's two seasons at Barcelona, he scored 38 goals in 58 appearances.

=== Napoli ===
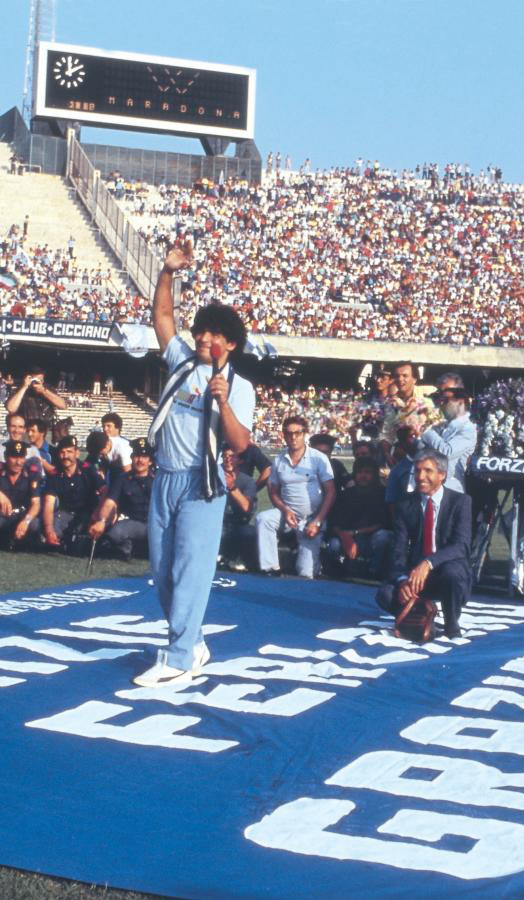
Maradona saluting the crowd at the Stadio San Paolo in Naples during his presentation on 5 July 1984.

On 5 July 1984, Maradona was presented as a Napoli player in front of 75,000 spectators at the Stadio San Paolo in Naples, Italy. Sports journalist David Goldblatt wrote that Napoli fans viewed Maradona as a "saviour". A local newspaper wrote that although Naples lacked a "mayor, houses, schools, buses, employment and sanitation, none of this matters because we have Maradona". Prior to Maradona's arrival, Italian football was dominated by teams from the north and centre of the country, such as AC Milan, Juventus, Inter Milan and Roma, and no team in the south of the Italian Peninsula had ever won a league title. When Maradona joined Napoli, the club was facing relegation from the top-tier Serie A league.

Maradona soon inherited the captain's armband from Napoli veteran defender Giuseppe Bruscolotti, and quickly became an adored star among the club's fans; in his time there he elevated the team to the most successful era in its history. Maradona played for Napoli at a period when north–south tensions in Italy were at a peak due to a variety of issues, notably the economic differences between the two. Shortly before the 1986 World Cup, he appeared for Tottenham Hotspur in a testimonial match for Osvaldo Ardiles against Internazionale.

Led by Maradona, Napoli won their first ever Serie A Championship in 1986–87. Goldblatt described the celebrations in Naples as "a round-the-clock carnival which ran for over a week". Murals of Maradona were painted on the city's ancient buildings, and newborn children were named after him. The same year, Napoli won the 1987 Coppa Italia final 4–0 on aggregate against Atalanta, with Maradona assisting Ciro Muro's goal in a 3–0 home victory in the first leg. In total, Maradona scored seven goals in ten matches during the competition.

The following season, the team's prolific attacking trio, formed by Maradona, Bruno Giordano, and Careca, was later dubbed the "Ma-Gi-Ca" (magical) front-line. Despite the team's failing to defend their league title, losing out to AC Milan after a collapse in the final five matches, Maradona was the Serie A top scorer in the 1987–88 season with 15 goals. He was also the top scorer for that season's Coppa Italia, scoring six goals, despite being eliminated in the quarter-finals by Torino, with Maradona's two goals in the second leg not enough to prevent the elimination. In the 1988–89 season, Napoli finished runner-up in the league and in the Coppa Italia, losing on aggregate to Sampdoria in the final; in the first leg, Maradona assisted Alessandro Renica's goal in a 1–0 home win, but Napoli were defeated 4–0 in the second leg. However the team avenged these runner-up finishes with the UEFA Cup title, won over two legs in the final against Stuttgart. During the second leg of the quarterfinals against rivals Juventus, Maradona scored a penalty, and Napoli eventually qualified to the next round after extra time. During the first leg of the finals, Maradona scored from a penalty in a 2–1 home victory and later assisted Careca's match-winning goal, while in the second leg on 17 May—a 3–3 away draw—he assisted Ciro Ferrara's goal with a header.

Napoli would win their second league title in 1989–90, with Maradona setting-up Marco Baroni's goal in a 1–0 home win over Lazio on the final match-day, which saw them clinch the title; the team later won the 1990 Italian Supercup the following season, beating rivals Juventus 5–1, with Maradona setting up Massimo Crippa's goal. He also became the all-time leading goalscorer for Napoli, ending his tenure on the team with 115 goals. His record was broken by Marek Hamšík in 2017.

Although Maradona was successful on the field during his time in Italy, his personal problems increased. His cocaine use continued, and he received US$70,000 in fines from his club for missing games and practices, ostensibly because of "stress". He faced a scandal there regarding an illegitimate son, and he was also the object of controversy over a friendship with the Giuliano clan of the Camorra crime syndicate. He also faced intense backlash and harassment from some local fans after the 1990 World Cup, in which he and Argentina beat Italy in a semi-final match at the San Paolo stadium.

In 2000, the number 10 jersey of Napoli was officially retired, but in 2011, Maradona stated that he wanted Ezequiel Lavezzi to use it. In a poll on Il Mattino, 54% of fans voted to keep the shirt retired, and the change ultimately did not occur. On 4 December 2020, nine days after Maradona's death, Napoli's home stadium was renamed Stadio Diego Armando Maradona.

=== Late career ===
After serving a 15-month ban for failing a drug test for cocaine, Maradona left Napoli in 1991. Despite interest from Real Madrid and Marseille, he signed for Sevilla, where he stayed for one year. In 1993, he played for Newell's Old Boys and in 1995 he returned to Boca Juniors for two years. In 1996, he played in a friendly match for Toronto Italia alongside his brother Raúl, against the Canadian National Soccer League All-Stars. In 2000, Maradona captained Bayern Munich against the German national team in a farewell exhibition game for Lothar Matthäus. Maradona was himself given a testimonial match on 10 November 2001, played between an all-star World XI team and the Argentina national team at La Bombonera. Maradona scored twice from penalty kicks during his team's 6–3 victory.

== International career ==
=== Debut at age 16 ===
Maradona made his full international debut at age 16, against Hungary, on 27 February 1977, only four months after his professional debut for Argentinos Juniors.

He was left off the Argentine squad for the 1978 World Cup on home soil by coach César Luis Menotti who felt he was too young at age 17. On 3 November 1978, just a few days after turning 18, Maradona played for the U20 Argentina team in a friendly match against Franz Beckenbauer's New York Cosmos, scoring twice in a 2–1 win.

=== 1979 World Youth Championship and Copa América ===
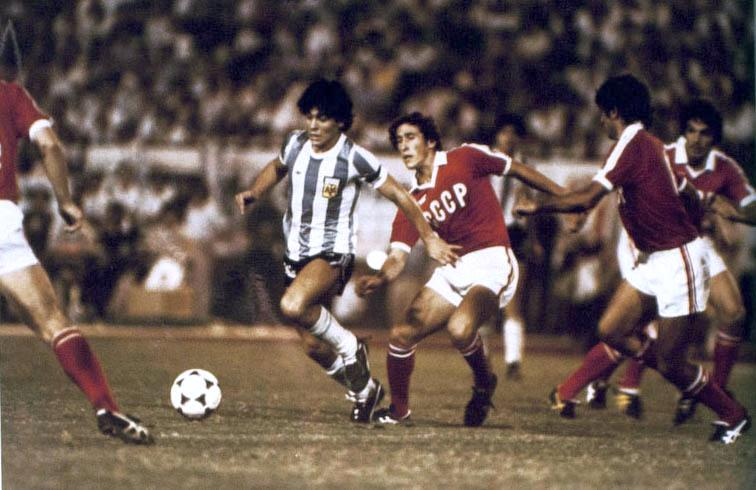
Maradona on the ball against the Soviet Union in the 1979 FIFA World Youth Championship Final in Japan.

At age 18, Maradona played the 1979 FIFA World Youth Championship in Japan and emerged as the star of the tournament, shining in Argentina's 3–1 final win over the Soviet Union, scoring a total of six goals in six appearances in the tournament. On 2 June 1979, Maradona scored his first senior international goal in a 3–1 win against Scotland at Hampden Park.

He went on to play for Argentina in two 1979 Copa América ties during August 1979, a 2–1 loss against Brazil and a 3–0 win over Bolivia in which he scored his side's third goal. Speaking thirty years later on the impact of Maradona's performances in 1979, FIFA President Sepp Blatter stated, "Everyone has an opinion on Diego Armando Maradona, and that's been the case since his playing days. My most vivid recollection is of this incredibly gifted kid at the second FIFA U-20 World Cup in Japan in 1979. He left everyone open-mouthed every time he got on the ball." Maradona and his compatriot Lionel Messi are the only players to win the Golden Ball at both the FIFA World Youth Championship and FIFA World Cup. Maradona did so in 1979 and 1986, which Messi emulated in 2005 and 2014 (and again in 2022).

=== 1982 FIFA World Cup ===
Maradona played his first World Cup tournament in 1982 in his new country of residence, Spain. Argentina played Belgium in the opening game of the 1982 Cup at the Camp Nou in Barcelona. Maradona did not perform to expectations, as Argentina, the defending champions, lost 1–0. Although the team convincingly beat both Hungary and El Salvador in Alicante to progress to the second round, there were internal tensions within the team, with the younger, less experienced players at odds with the older, more experienced players. With a team that also included such players as Mario Kempes, Osvaldo Ardiles, Ramón Díaz, Daniel Bertoni, Alberto Tarantini, Ubaldo Fillol and Daniel Passarella, the Argentine side was defeated in the second round by Brazil and by eventual winners Italy. The Italian match is renowned for Maradona being aggressively man-marked by Claudio Gentile, as Italy beat Argentina at the Sarrià Stadium in Barcelona, 2–1.

Maradona played in all five matches without being substituted, scoring twice against Hungary. He was fouled repeatedly in all five games and particularly in the last one against Brazil at the Sarrià, a game that was blighted by poor officiating and violent fouls. With Argentina already down 3–0 to Brazil, Maradona's temper eventually got the better of him and he was sent off with five minutes remaining for a serious retaliatory foul against Batista.

=== 1986 FIFA World Cup ===
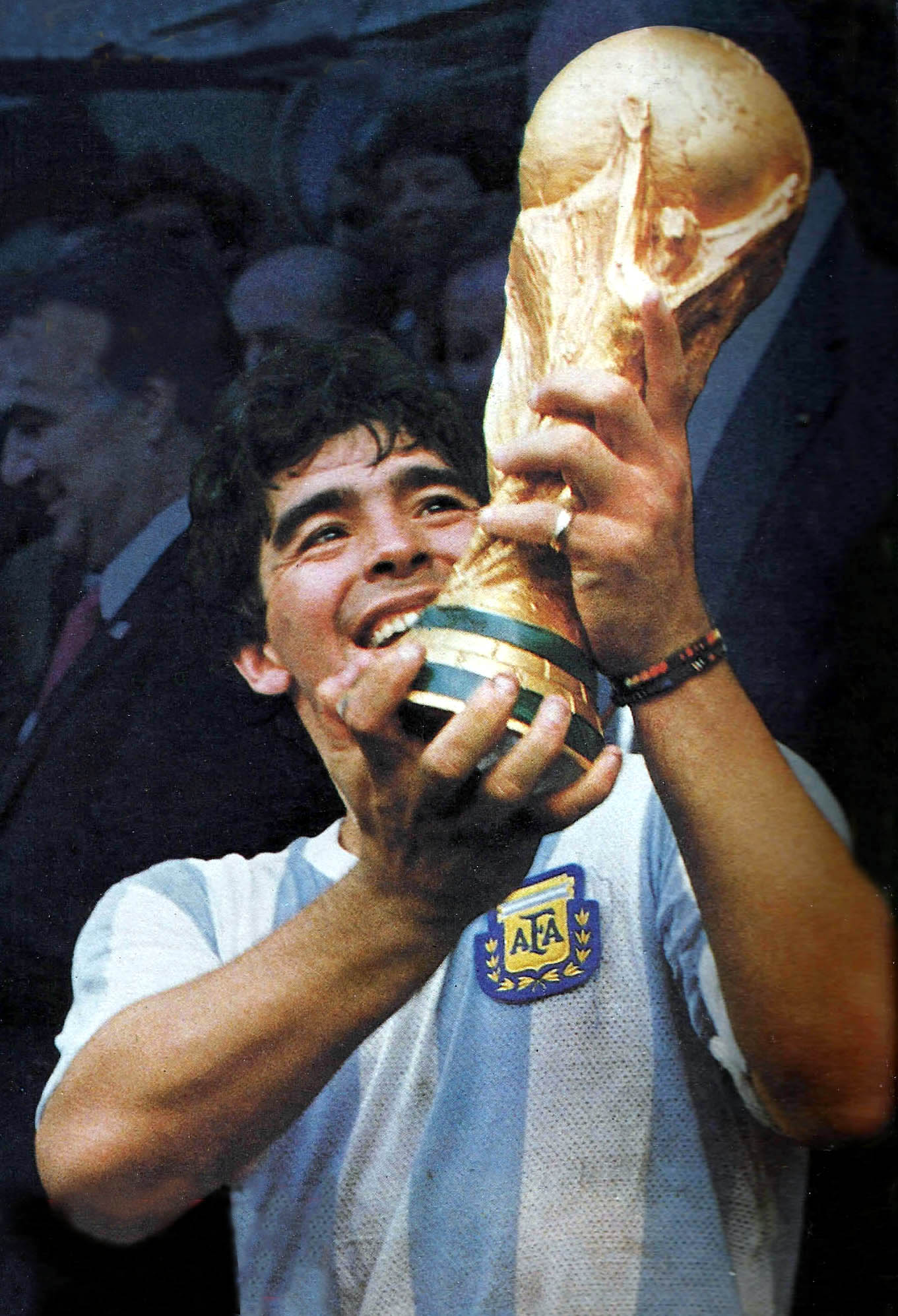
Maradona holding the FIFA World Cup Trophy after winning the 1986 final against West Germany.

Maradona captained Argentina to victory at the 1986 World Cup in Mexico. Coach Carlos Bilardo employed a 3–5–2 formation designed to maximise Maradona's influence, allowing him to operate between midfield and attack. Jorge Valdano led the forward line, while Jorge Burruchaga supported Maradona's attacking movements and Sergio Batista provided balance in midfield. Maradona played every minute of every Argentina game, scoring five goals and serving five assists. His first three assists came in Argentina's opening match, a 3–1 win over South Korea. His first goal of the tournament came in a 1–1 draw against Italy in the second group match. In the final group match, Maradona assisted Jorge Burruchaga's goal in a 2–0 win over Bulgaria. Argentina defeated Uruguay 1–0 in the first knockout round, a match that Maradona described as his best performance of the tournament.

Argentina's quarter-final match against England was played four years after the Falklands War, a conflict between Argentina and the United Kingdom. Argentina won the match 2–1, with Maradona scoring two goals. He scored the first goal by striking the ball with his hand. After the match, Maradona said the goal was scored "a little with the head of Maradona and a little with the hand of God". The goal, which had been allowed to stand by the referee, became known as the "Hand of God". In 2005, Maradona admitted that he had hit the ball with his hand on purpose, that his head did not touch the ball, and that he immediately knew the goal was illegitimate.

Four minutes after the Hand of God, Maradona scored his second goal, which was later voted by FIFA as the greatest goal in the history of the World Cup. He received the ball in his own half, and with 11 touches ran more than half the length of the field, dribbling past six English players, including goalkeeper Peter Shilton, before kicking the ball into the net. The goal was voted "Goal of the Century" in a 2002 online poll conducted by FIFA. In Argentina's semi-final victory against Belgium, Maradona scored two more goals. In the final, West Germany attempted to contain him by double-marking him, but in the 84th minute he served the assist to Burruchaga's game-winning goal. Argentina defeated West Germany 3–2 at the Estadio Azteca, with Maradona lifting the World Cup trophy as captain. During the tournament, Maradona scored or assisted ten of Argentina's 14 goals (71%) and was fouled 53 times—a World Cup record. (Note: Attributed to multiple references:) Maradona also completed 53 successful dribbles during the tournament—another World Cup record—and created 27 goalscoring chances for his teammates. He won the Golden Ball as the best player of the tournament by a unanimous vote. (Note: Attributed to multiple references:) A statue of him scoring the Goal of the Century was later erected at the entrance to the Estadio Azteca.

Video
- The "Hand of God" and the "Goal of the Century" on YouTube

Writing for Sportsnet, John Molinaro said that Maradona single-handedly won the 1986 World Cup for Argentina, while Roger Bennett of ESPN FC said Maradona delivered the most "virtuoso" performance in World Cup history. Kevin Baxter of the Los Angeles Times and Steven Goff of The Washington Post described Maradona's performance as one of the greatest performances in the history of tournament football. Russell Thomas of The Guardian referred to the Goal of the Century as arguably the greatest individual goal in history, while Molinaro called it "pure art" and possibly the greatest goal in football history. In reference to the Goal of the Century and the Hand of God goals, the French newspaper L'Équipe described Maradona as "half-angel, half-devil".

=== 1987 and 1989 Copa América ===
At the 1987 Copa América in Argentina, Maradona scored three goals in four matches, including two goals in a 3–0 victory against Ecuador. Argentina lost the semi-final 1–0 against eventual champions Uruguay. At the 1989 Copa América in Brazil, Maradona provided an assist for Claudio Caniggia's goal in a 1–0 win over Uruguay in the first round. Argentina finished the tournament in third place.

=== 1990 FIFA World Cup ===
At the 1990 World Cup in Italy, Maradona captained Argentina to a second consecutive World Cup final. His performance was hampered by an ankle injury that required injections of painkillers. In Argentina's second group match, a 2–0 win over the USSR, Maradona blocked a shot inside the box with his hand, which went unnoticed by the referee. The incident was compared to his "Hand of God" goal during the 1986 World Cup. In Argentina's final group match, Maradona assisted Pedro Monzón's goal from a corner kick in a 1–1 draw against Romania. In the round of 16 match against Brazil, Maradona served the assist for Claudio Caniggia's goal as Argentina achieved a 1–0 victory. The semi-final against Italy—played at Maradona's club stadium in Naples—went to a penalty shoot-out after a 1–1 draw. Maradona scored his penalty kick, which put Argentina through to the final, where they lost 1–0 to West Germany. The only goal came from a controversial penalty kick scored by Andreas Brehme. At the end of the match, Maradona burst into tears and blamed the referee for the loss.

=== 1993 Artemio Franchi Cup and 1994 FIFA World Cup ===
On 24 February 1993, Maradona returned to the national team when Argentina played the 1993 Artemio Franchi Cup against Denmark in Mar del Plata. Argentina won 5–4 in a penalty shoot-out after a 1–1 draw.

At the 1994 World Cup in the United States, Maradona failed a drug test for ephedrine and was expelled from the tournament for doping after two games. In the first game, he scored once as Argentina defeated Greece 4–0. The second game, a 2–1 victory over Nigeria, was his last game for Argentina. Maradona assisted both of Argentina's goals from free kicks. Argentina were subsequently eliminated in the round of 16 by Romania. According to Maradona, his personal trainer Daniel Cerrini ran out of the supplement "Ripped Fast" after the game against Greece and bought the similarly named "Ripped Fuel", believing it to be an equal substitute, and unaware it contained ephedrine.

== Player profile ==
=== Style of play ===
Described as a "classic number 10" in the media, Maradona was a traditional playmaker who usually played in a free role, either as an attacking midfielder behind the forwards, or as a second striker in a front–two, although he was also deployed as an offensive–minded central midfielder in a 4–4–2 formation on occasion. (Note: Attributed to multiple references:) He was renowned for his dribbling ability, vision, close ball control, passing and creativity, and is considered to have been one of the most skilful players in the sport. On his ball control, Michel Platini stated, "Diego was capable of things no one else could match. The things I could do with a football, he could do with an orange." He had a compact physique, and with his strong legs, low centre of gravity, and resulting balance, he could withstand physical pressure well while running with the ball, despite his small stature, while his acceleration, quick feet, and agility, combined with his dribbling skills and close control at speed, allowed him to change direction quickly, making him difficult for opponents to defend against. (Note: Attributed to multiple references:)

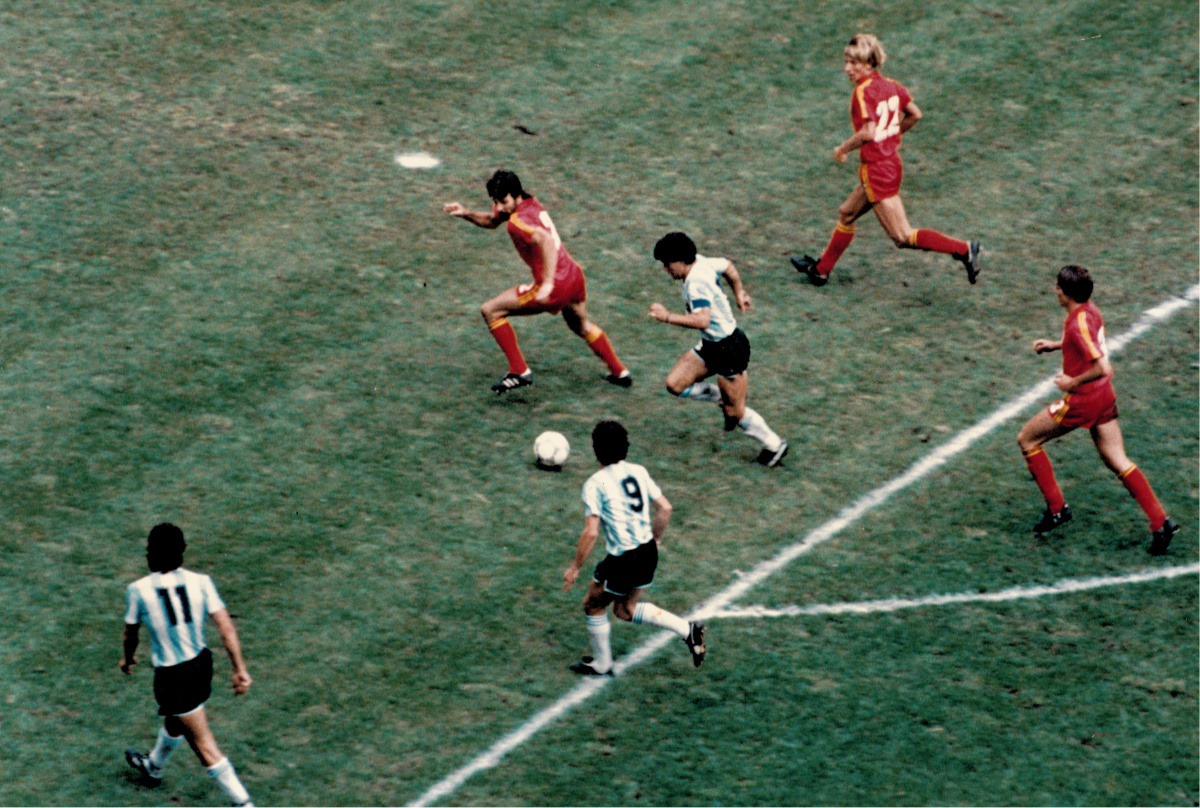
Viewed as one of the best dribblers in the game, Maradona (pictured on the ball against Belgium in 1986) would often go on runs against the opposition.

On his dribbling ability, former Dutch player Johan Cruyff saw similarities between Maradona and Lionel Messi with the ball seemingly attached to their boot. His physical strengths were illustrated by his two goals against Belgium in the 1986 World Cup. Although he was known for his penchant for undertaking individual runs with the ball, he was also a strategist and an intelligent team player, with excellent spatial awareness, as well as being highly technical with the ball. He was effective in limited spaces, and would attract defenders only to quickly dash out of the melee (as in the second goal against England in 1986), (Note: Attributed to multiple references:) or give an assist to a free teammate. Being short, but strong, he could hold the ball long enough with a defender on his back to wait for a teammate making a run or to find a gap for a quick shot. He showed leadership qualities on the field and captained Argentina in their World Cup campaigns of 1986, 1990 and 1994. While he was primarily a creative playmaker, Maradona was also known for his finishing and goalscoring ability. Former Milan manager Arrigo Sacchi also praised Maradona for his defensive work-rate off the ball in a 2010 interview with Il Corriere dello Sport.

The team leader on and off the field – he would speak up on a range of issues on behalf of the players – Maradona's ability as a player and his overpowering personality had a major positive effect on his team, with his 1986 World Cup teammate Jorge Valdano stating:

Maradona was a technical leader: a guy who resolved all difficulties that may come up on the pitch. Firstly, he was in charge of making the miracles happen, that's something that gives team-mates a lot of confidence. Secondly, the scope of his celebrity was such that he absorbed all the pressures on behalf of his team-mates. What I mean is: one slept soundly the night before a game not just because you knew you were playing next to Diego and Diego did things no other player in the world could do, but also because unconsciously we knew that if it was the case that we lost then Maradona would shoulder more of the burden, would be blamed more, than the rest of us. That was the kind of influence he exercised on the team.

On the charismatic quality of Maradona, another of his Argentina teammates, Gabriel Batistuta, stated, "Diego could command a stadium, have everyone watch him. I played with him and I can tell you how technically decisive he was for the team". Napoli's former president – Corrado Ferlaino – commented on Maradona's leadership qualities during his time with the club in 2008, describing him as "a coach on the pitch."

One of Maradona's trademark moves was dribbling full-speed on the right wing, and on reaching the opponent's goal line, delivering accurate passes to his teammates. Another trademark was the rabona, a reverse-cross pass shot behind the leg that holds all the weight. This manoeuvre led to several assists, such as the cross for Ramón Díaz's header against Switzerland in 1980. Moreover, he was also a well–known proponent of the roulette, a feint which involved him dragging the ball back first with one foot and then the other, while simultaneously performing a 360° turn; due to his penchant for using this move, it has even occasionally been described as the "Maradona turn" in the media. He was also a dangerous free kick and penalty kick taker, who was renowned for his ability to bend the ball from corners and direct set pieces. Regarded as one of the best dead-ball specialists of all time, (Note: Attributed to multiple references:) his free kick technique, which often saw him raise his knee at a high angle when striking the ball, thus enabling him to lift it high over the wall, allowed him to score free kicks even from close range, within 22 to 17 yards (20 to 16 metres) from the goal, or even just outside the penalty area. His style of taking free kicks influenced several other specialists, including Gianfranco Zola, Andrea Pirlo, and Lionel Messi.

Maradona was famous for his cunning personality. Some critics view his controversial "Hand of God" goal at the 1986 World Cup as a clever manoeuvre, with one of the opposition players, Glenn Hoddle, admitting that Maradona had disguised it by flicking his head at the same time as palming the ball. The goal itself has been viewed as an embodiment of the Buenos Aires shanty town Maradona was brought up in and its concept of viveza criolla—"cunning of the criollos". Although critical of the illegitimate first goal, England striker Gary Lineker conceded, "When Diego scored that second goal against us, I felt like applauding. It was impossible to score such a beautiful goal. He's the greatest player of all time, by a long way. A genuine phenomenon." Maradona used his hand in the 1990 World Cup, again without punishment, and this time on his own goal line, to prevent the Soviet Union from scoring. A number of publications have referred to Maradona as the Artful Dodger, the urchin pickpocket from Charles Dickens' Oliver Twist. (Note: Attributed to multiple references:)

Maradona was dominantly left-footed, often using his left foot even when the ball was positioned more suitably for a right-footed connection. His first goal against Belgium in the 1986 World Cup semi-final is a worthy indicator of such; he had run into the inside right channel to receive a pass but let the ball travel across to his left foot, requiring more technical ability. During his run past several England players in the previous round for the "Goal of the Century" he did not use his right foot once, despite spending the whole movement on the right-hand side of the pitch. In the 1990 World Cup second-round tie against Brazil, he used his right foot to set up the winning goal for Claudio Caniggia due to two Brazilian markers forcing him into a position that made use of his left foot less practical.

=== Reception ===
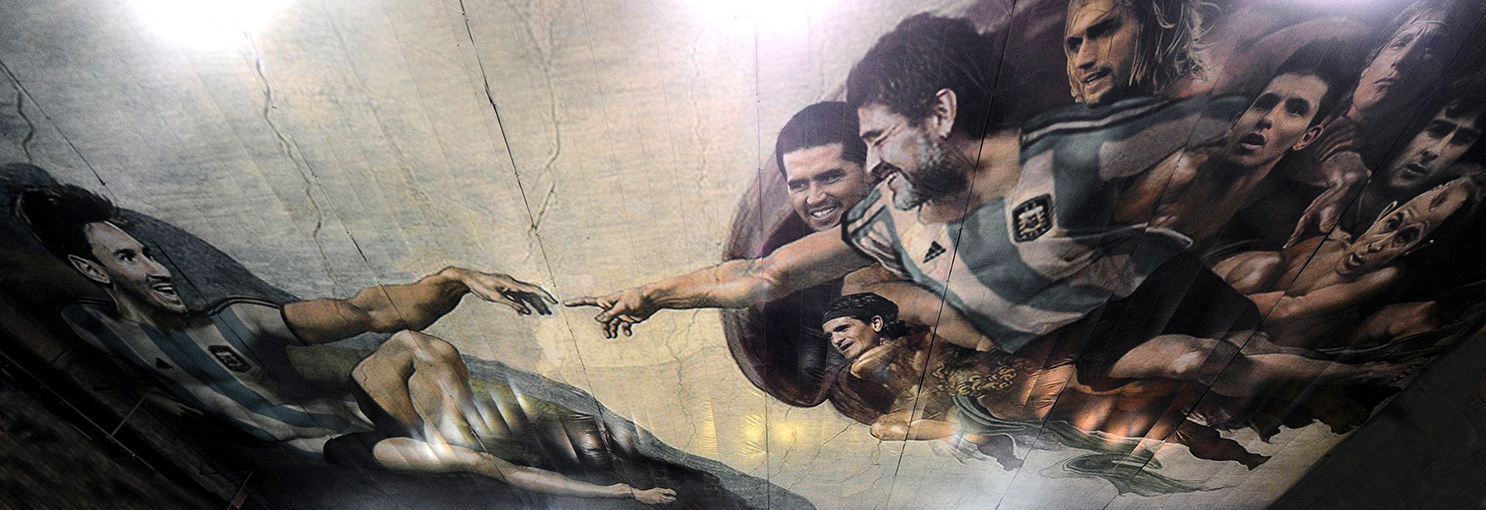
Maradona (right) and Lionel Messi in The Sistine Chapel of Football painting, on a ceiling of a sports club in Barracas, Buenos Aires.

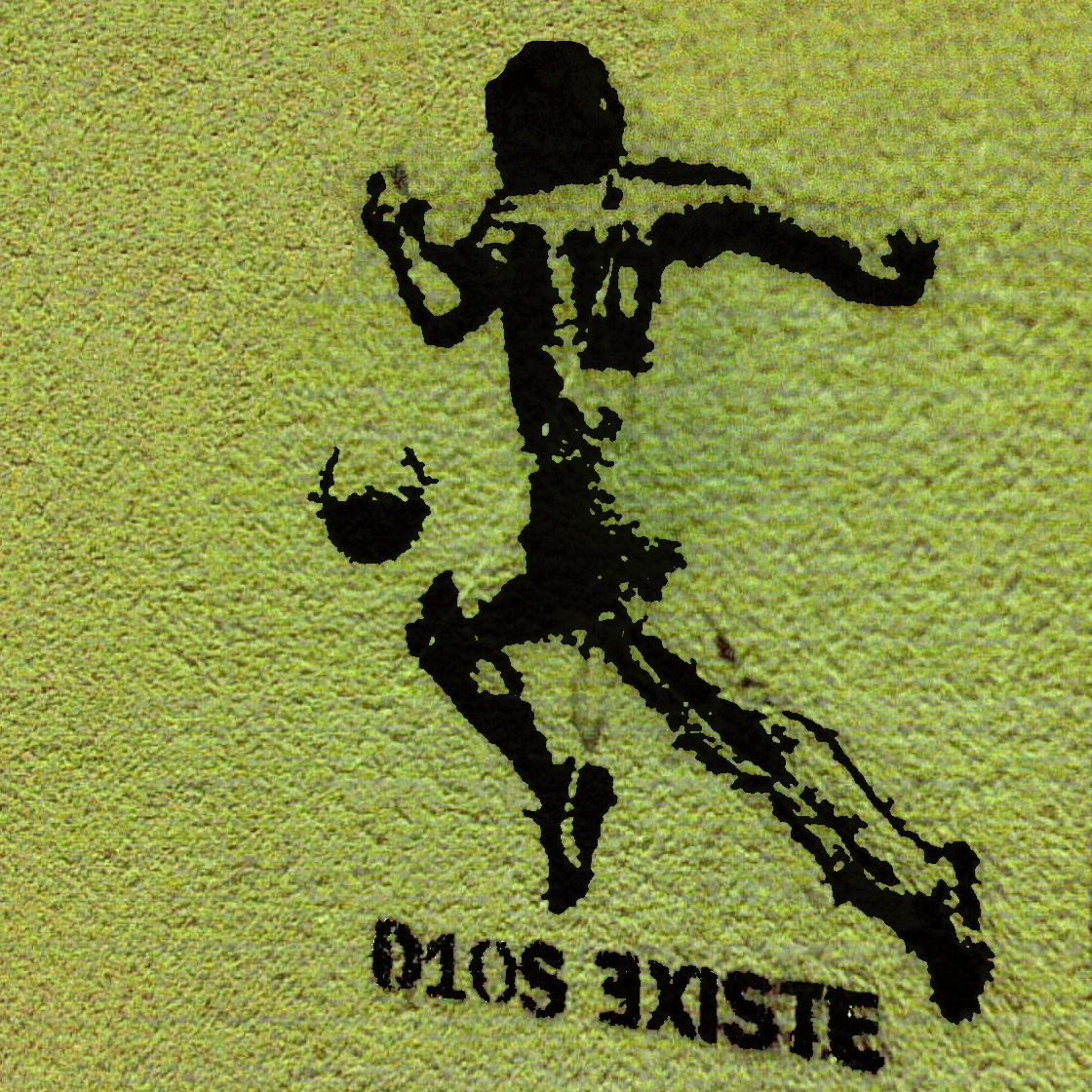
Graffiti of Maradona. His nickname 'D10S' alludes to his playing number and the Spanish word for God.

Maradona is widely regarded as the best player of his generation. He is considered one of the greatest players of all time by pundits, players, and managers, and by some as the best player ever. (Note: Attributed to multiple references:) Known as one of the most skilful players in the game, he is regarded as one of the greatest dribblers (Note: Attributed to multiple references:) and free kick takers in history. A precocious talent in his youth, in addition to his playing ability, Maradona also drew praise from his former manager Menotti for his dedication, determination, and the work-ethic he demonstrated in order to improve the technical aspect of his game in training, despite his natural gifts, with the manager noting: "I'm always cautious about using the word 'genius'. I find it hard to apply that even to Mozart. The beauty of Diego's game has a hereditary element – his natural ease with the ball – but it also owes a lot to his ability to learn: a lot of those brushstrokes, those strokes of 'genius', are in fact a product of his hard work. Diego worked very hard to be the best." Maradona's former Napoli manager – Ottavio Bianchi – also praised his discipline in training, commenting: "Diego is different to the one that they depict. When you got him on his own he was a very good kid. It was beautiful to watch him and coach him. They all speak of the fact that he did not train, but it was not true because Diego was the last person to leave the pitch, it was necessary to send him away because otherwise he would stay for hours to invent free kicks." However, although, as Bianchi noted, Maradona was known for making "great plays" and doing "unimaginable" and "incredible things" with the ball during training sessions, and would even go through periods of rigorous exercise, he was equally known for his limited work-rate in training without the ball, and even gained a degree of infamy during his time in Italy for missing training sessions with Napoli, while he often trained independently instead of with his team. (Note: Attributed to multiple references:)

Pelé scored more goals. Lionel Messi has won more trophies. Both have lived more stable lives than the overweight former cocaine addict who tops this list, whose relationship with football became increasingly strained the longer his career continued. If you've seen Diego Maradona with a football at his feet, you'll understand.

— Maradona topping FourFourTwo magazine's "100 Greatest Footballers Ever" list, July 2017.

In a 2019 documentary film on his life, Diego Maradona, Maradona confessed that his weekly regime consisted of "playing a game on Sunday, going out until Wednesday, then hitting the gym on Thursday." Regarding his inconsistent training regimen, the film's director, Asif Kapadia, commented in 2020: "He had a metabolism. He would look so incredibly out of shape, but then he'd train like crazy and sweat it off by the time matchday came along. His body shape just didn't look like a footballer, but then he had this ability and this balance. He had a way of being, and that idea of talking to him honestly about how a typical week transpired was pretty amazing." He also revealed that Maradona was ahead of his time in the fact that he had a personal fitness coach – Fernando Signorini – who trained him in a variety of areas, in addition to looking after his physical conditioning, adding: "While he [Maradona] was in a football team he had his own regime. How many players would do that? How many players would even know to think like that? 'I'm different to anyone else so I need to train at what I'm good at and what I'm weak at.' Signorini is very well read and very intelligent. He would literally say, 'This is the way I'm going to train you, read this book.' He would help him psychologically, talk to him about philosophy, and things like that." Moreover, Maradona was notorious for his poor diet and extreme lifestyle off the pitch, including his use of illicit drugs and alcohol abuse, which along with personal issues, his metabolism, medication that he was prescribed, and periods of inactivity due to injuries and suspensions, led to his significant weight–gain and physical decline as his career progressed; his lack of discipline and difficulties in his turbulent personal life are thought by some in the sport to have negatively impacted his performances and longevity in the later years of his playing career.

A controversial figure in the sport, while he earned critical acclaim from players, pundits and managers over his playing style, he also drew criticism in the media for his temper and confrontational behaviour, both on and off the pitch. However, Paolo Maldini described Maradona both as the greatest player he ever faced, and also as the most honest, stating: "He was a model of good behaviour on the pitch. He was respectful of everyone, from the great players down to the ordinary team member. He was always getting kicked around and he never complained, not like some of today's strikers." Franco Baresi stated when he was asked who was his greatest opponent: "Maradona. When he was on form, there was almost no way of stopping him", while fellow former Italy defender Giuseppe Bergomi described Maradona as the greatest player of all time in 2018. Zlatan Ibrahimović said that his off-field antics did not matter, and that he should only be judged for the impact he made on the field. "For me Maradona is more than football. What he did as a footballer, in my opinion, he will be remembered forever. When you see number 10 who do you think about? Maradona. It is a symbol, even today there are those who choose that number for him."

Today his skills would afford him greater protection. Back then they merely served as the red rag of provocation that would guarantee he would be the victim of brutal challenges wherever he played. The rules changed as a direct result of some of the injuries Maradona received. When I interviewed him a few years ago, he told me he thought players such as Lionel Messi owed him a great deal because some of the tackles he had endured would never be allowed today.

— Guillem Balagué writing for the BBC in 2020 on 'the magician, the cheat, the god, the flawed genius'.

In 1999, Maradona was placed second behind Pelé by World Soccer in the magazine's list of the "100 Greatest Players of the 20th Century". Along with Pelé, Maradona was one of the two joint winners of the "FIFA Player of the Century" award in 2000, and also placed fifth in "IFFHS' Century Elections". In a 2014 FIFA poll, Maradona was voted the second-greatest number 10 of all time, behind only Pelé, and later that year, was ranked second in The Guardian's list of the 100 greatest World Cup players of all time, ahead of the 2014 World Cup in Brazil, once again behind Pelé. In May 2020, Sky Sports ranked Maradona as the best player never to have won the European Cup/UEFA Champions League. In November 2026, The Guardian selected Maradona as the footballer best associated with the number 10, stating that "to Maradona, the No 10 was a way of life, part of a uniquely Argentinian identity – that of the pibe, the creative genius from a poor background blessed with celestial skill and the vicious defiance of an alley cat."

== Retirement and tributes ==
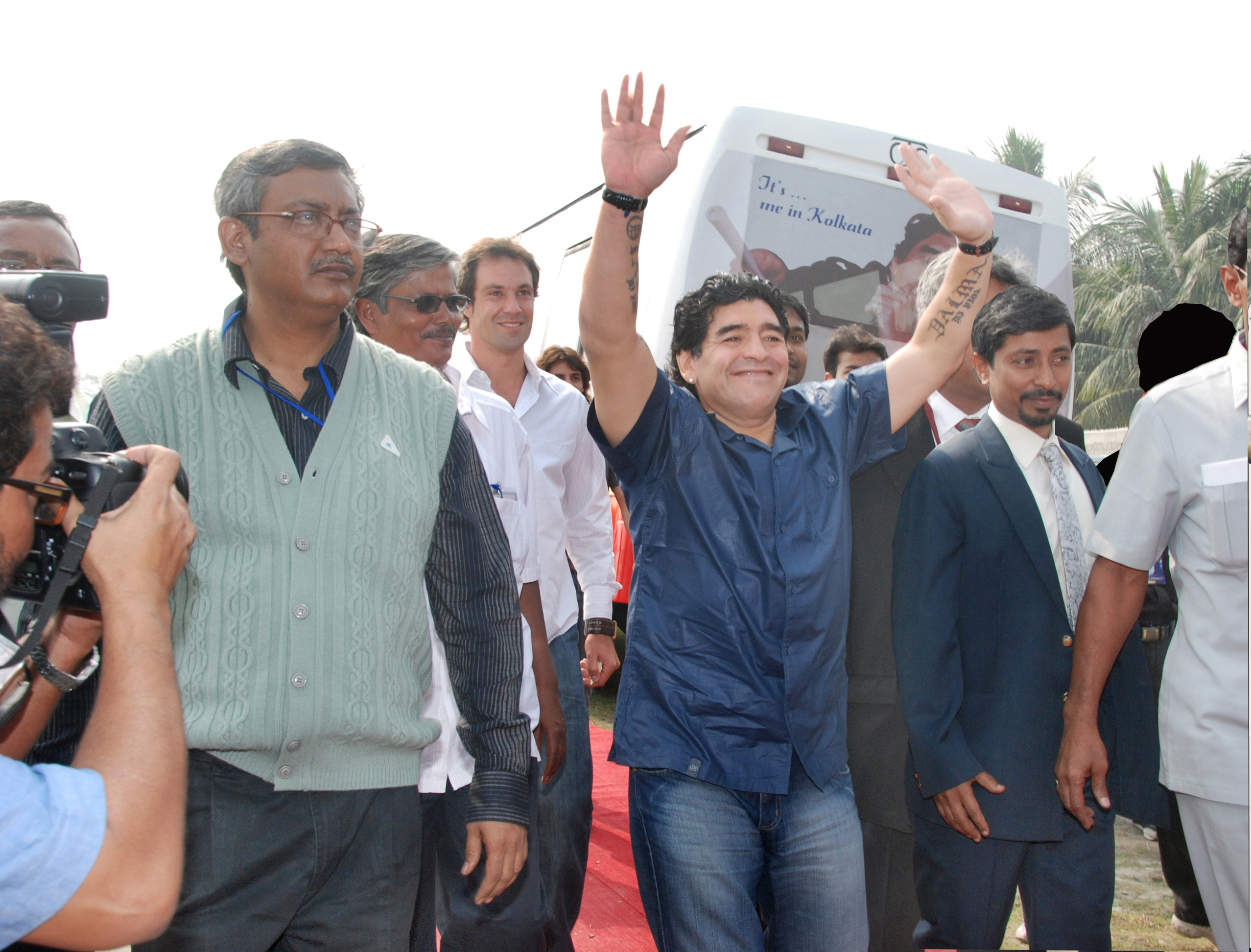
Maradona in Kolkata, India, in December 2008. Maradona laid the foundation stone for a football academy in the eastern suburbs of the city, and was greeted by over 100,000 fans in Salt Lake Stadium.

In 1990, the Konex Foundation from Argentina granted him the Diamond Konex Award, one of the most prestigious culture awards in Argentina, as the most important personality in sports in the last decade in his country. Hounded for years by the press, in 1994 Maradona fired a compressed-air rifle at reporters whom he claimed were invading his privacy. In April 1996, Maradona had a three-round exhibition boxing match with Santos Laciar for charity. In 2000, he published his autobiography Yo Soy El Diego ("I am The Diego"), which became a bestseller in Argentina. Two years later, Maradona donated the Cuban royalties of his book to "the Cuban people and Fidel".

In 2001, the Argentine Football Association (AFA) asked FIFA for authorisation to retire the jersey number 10 for Maradona. FIFA did not grant the request, even though Argentine officials have maintained that FIFA hinted that it would.

In January 2005, Maradona became a member of Olympiacos and appeared in the Karaiskakis Stadium to accept his member card. He reappeared in the stadium in 2006, this time wearing an Olympiacos shirt.

On 22 June 2005, it was announced that Maradona would return to former club Boca Juniors as a sports vice-president in charge of managing the First Division roster (after a disappointing 2004–05 season, which coincided with Boca's centenary). His contract began 1 August 2005, and one of his first recommendations proved to be very effective: advising the club to hire Alfio Basile as the new coach. With Maradona fostering a close relationship with the players, Boca won the 2005 Apertura, the 2006 Clausura, the 2005 Copa Sudamericana, and the 2005 Recopa Sudamericana.

On 15 August 2005, Maradona made his debut as host of a talk-variety show on Argentine television, La Noche del 10 ("The Night of the no. 10"). In May 2006, Maradona agreed to take part in UK's Soccer Aid (a program to raise money for UNICEF). In September 2006, Maradona, in his famous blue and white number 10, was the captain for Argentina in a three-day World Cup of Indoor Football tournament in Spain. On 26 August 2006, it was announced that Maradona was quitting his position in the club Boca Juniors because of disagreements with the AFA, who selected Alfio Basile to be the new coach of the Argentina national team. In 2008, Serbian filmmaker Emir Kusturica made Maradona, a documentary about Maradona's life.

On 1 September 2014, Maradona, along with many current and former footballing stars, took part in the "Match for Peace", which was played at the Stadio Olimpico in Rome, with the proceeds being donated entirely to charity.

== Managerial career ==
=== Club management ===
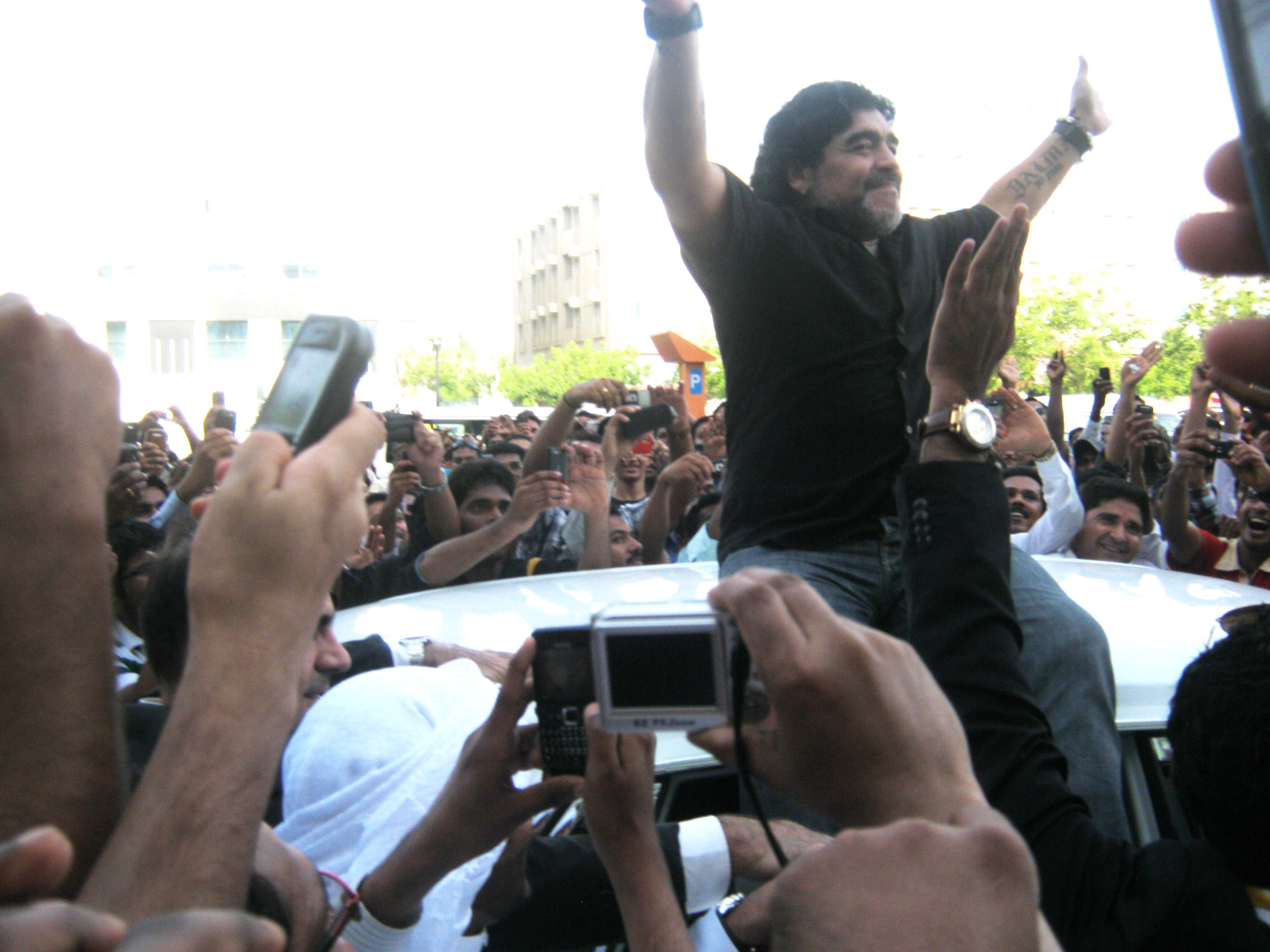
Maradona greeting fans after being appointed manager of Dubai club Al Wasl in June 2011.

Maradona began his managerial career alongside Carlos Fren, coaching Mandiyú in 1994 and Racing Club in 1995. He managed Al Wasl FC from 2011 until his dismissal in 2012. In 2013, he became a "spiritual coach" at Deportivo Riestra. He coached Fujairah in the UAE second division in 2017–18, leaving after failing to secure automatic promotion. In May 2018, he was appointed chairman of Belarusian club Dynamo Brest.

In September 2018, Maradona became manager of Mexican second division club Dorados de Sinaloa. He left in June 2019 for health reasons, after the club failed to secure promotion.

In September 2019, he was appointed head coach of Gimnasia de La Plata. He resigned on 19 November but returned two days later amid negotiations over Gabriel Pellegrino's future as club president. His contract was renewed in June 2020, and he remained in charge until his death that November.

=== International management ===
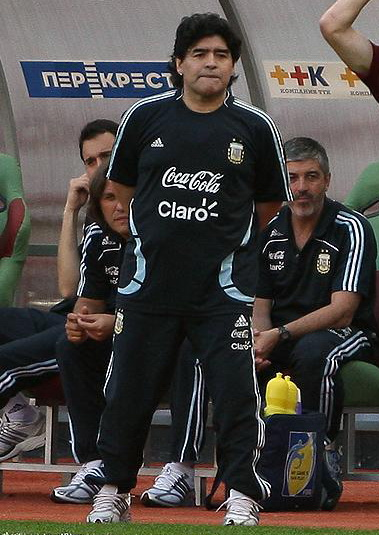
Maradona as coach of Argentina in 2009. He left the position after the 2010 FIFA World Cup in South Africa.

After the resignation of Argentina national team coach Alfio Basile in 2008, Maradona immediately proposed his candidacy for the vacant role. According to several press sources, his major challengers included Diego Simeone, Carlos Bianchi, Miguel Ángel Russo, and Sergio Batista. On 29 October 2008, AFA chairman Julio Grondona confirmed that Maradona would be the head coach of the national team. On 19 November, Maradona managed Argentina for the first time when they played against Scotland at Hampden Park in Glasgow, which Argentina won 1–0.

After winning his first three matches as the coach of the national team, he oversaw a 6–1 defeat to Bolivia, equalling the team's worst ever margin of defeat. With two matches remaining in qualifiers for the 2010 World Cup, Argentina was in fifth place and faced the possibility of failing to qualify, but victory in the last two matches secured qualification. At a post-game press conference after Argentina's qualification, Maradona told members of the media to "suck it and keep on sucking it". FIFA responded by giving him a two-month ban on all footballing activity and a CHF 25,000 fine. The friendly match scheduled to take place at home to the Czech Republic on 15 December, during the period of the ban, was cancelled. The only match Argentina played during Maradona's ban was a friendly match against Catalonia, which they lost 4–2.

At the 2010 FIFA World Cup, Argentina won all three of their group stage matches. After their elimination from the tournament following a 4–0 loss to Germany in the quarter-finals, Maradona said he was considering leaving his position as manager. On 27 July, the Argentine Football Association announced that its board had unanimously decided not to renew Maradona's contract.

== Personal life ==
=== Family ===
Maradona married his long-time fiancée Claudia Villafañe on 7 November 1989 in Buenos Aires. They had two daughters, Dalma Nerea (born in 1987) and Gianinna Dinorah (born in 1989). Gianinna married Argentine footballer Sergio Agüero and gave birth to Maradona's grandson, Benjamín. Maradona and Villafañe divorced in 2004. According to Dalma Nerea, her parents remained on friendly terms. They travelled together to Naples for a series of homages in June 2005 and were seen together at the 2006 World Cup. During the divorce proceedings, Maradona admitted that he was the father of Diego Sinagra, who was born in Naples in 1986. Diego Sinagra met Maradona for the first time in May 2003 after tricking his way onto a golf course in Italy where Maradona was playing. Sinagra played professional football until 2020. Maradona's mother died on 19 November 2011 at age 81, and his father died on 25 June 2015 at age 87.

In 2014, Maradona denied allegations that he assaulted his girlfriend, Rocío Oliva. In 2017, he bought her a house in Bella Vista, and in 2018 they separated. Maradona's great-nephew Hernán López is also a professional footballer.

=== Health ===
From the mid-1980s until 2004, Maradona was addicted to cocaine. He allegedly began using the drug in Barcelona in 1983. By the time he was playing for Napoli, the addiction was interfering with his ability to play football. Maradona was banned from football in both 1991 and 1994 for abusing drugs.

Maradona had a tendency to put on weight and suffered increasingly from obesity, at one point weighing 280 lb (130 kg). He was obese from the end of his playing career until undergoing gastric bypass surgery in a clinic in Cartagena, Colombia, on 6 March 2005. His surgeon said that Maradona would follow a liquid diet for three months in order to return to his normal weight. When Maradona resumed public appearances shortly thereafter, he displayed a notably thinner figure.

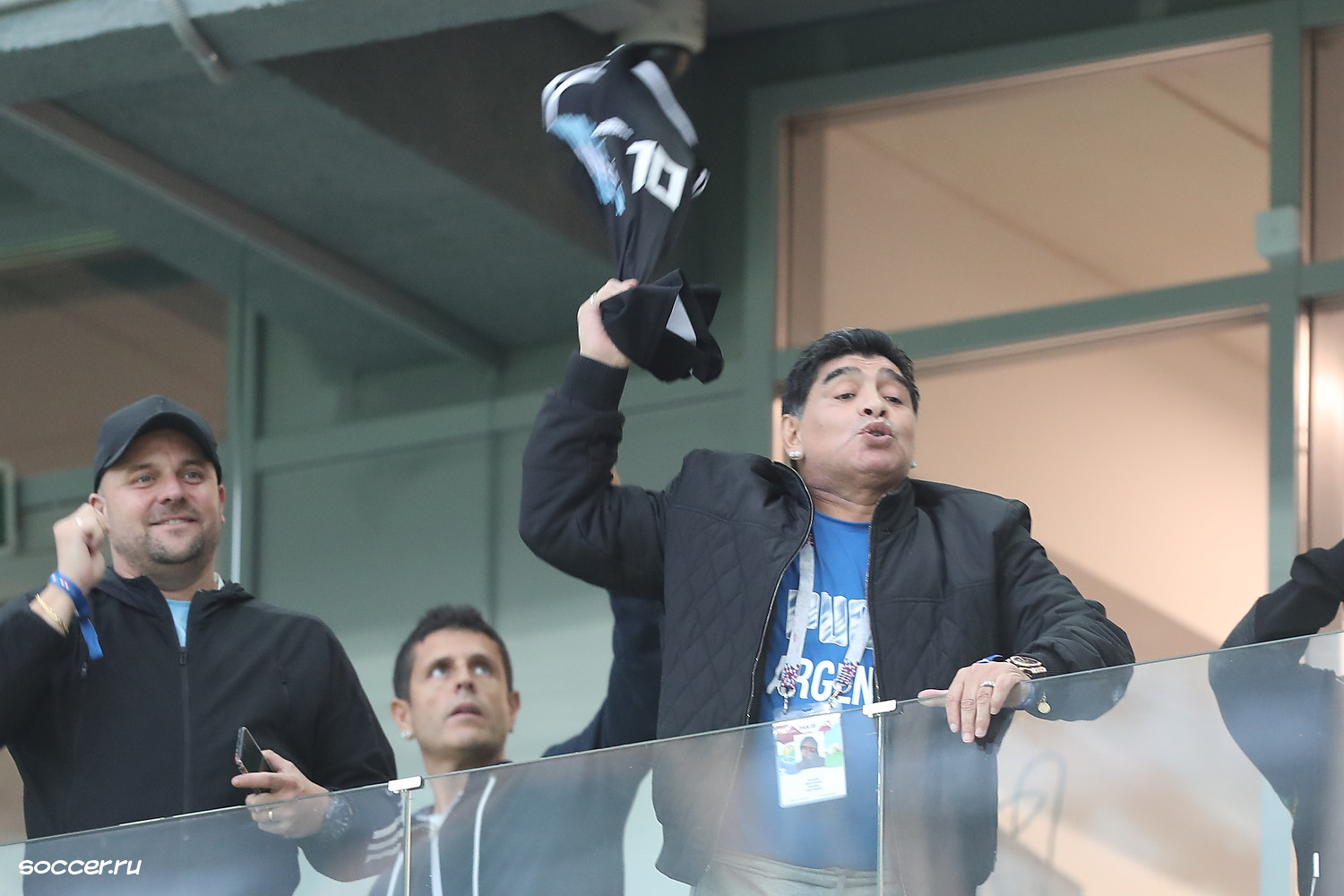
At the 2018 FIFA World Cup in Russia, Maradona was seen behaving erratically. He then collapsed and was treated by paramedics.

On 29 March 2007, Maradona was treated for hepatitis and effects of alcohol abuse at a hospital in Buenos Aires. He was released on 11 April, then readmitted two days later. In the following days, there were constant rumours about his health, including three false claims of his death within a month. After being transferred to a psychiatric clinic specialising in alcohol-related problems, Maradona was discharged on 7 May. The following day, Maradona appeared on Argentine television and stated that he had quit drinking and had not used drugs in two and a half years. During the 2018 World Cup match between Argentina and Nigeria, Maradona was seen behaving erratically. Following the match, he collapsed and was treated by paramedics; he later attributed his behaviour to consumption of wine. In January 2019, he underwent surgery after a hernia caused internal bleeding in his stomach.

In 2026, during the trial of Maradona's medical team for medical negligence, Maradona's psychologist Carlos Diaz stated that he had been diagnosed with both bipolar disorder and narcissistic personality disorder during his lifetime.

=== Political views ===
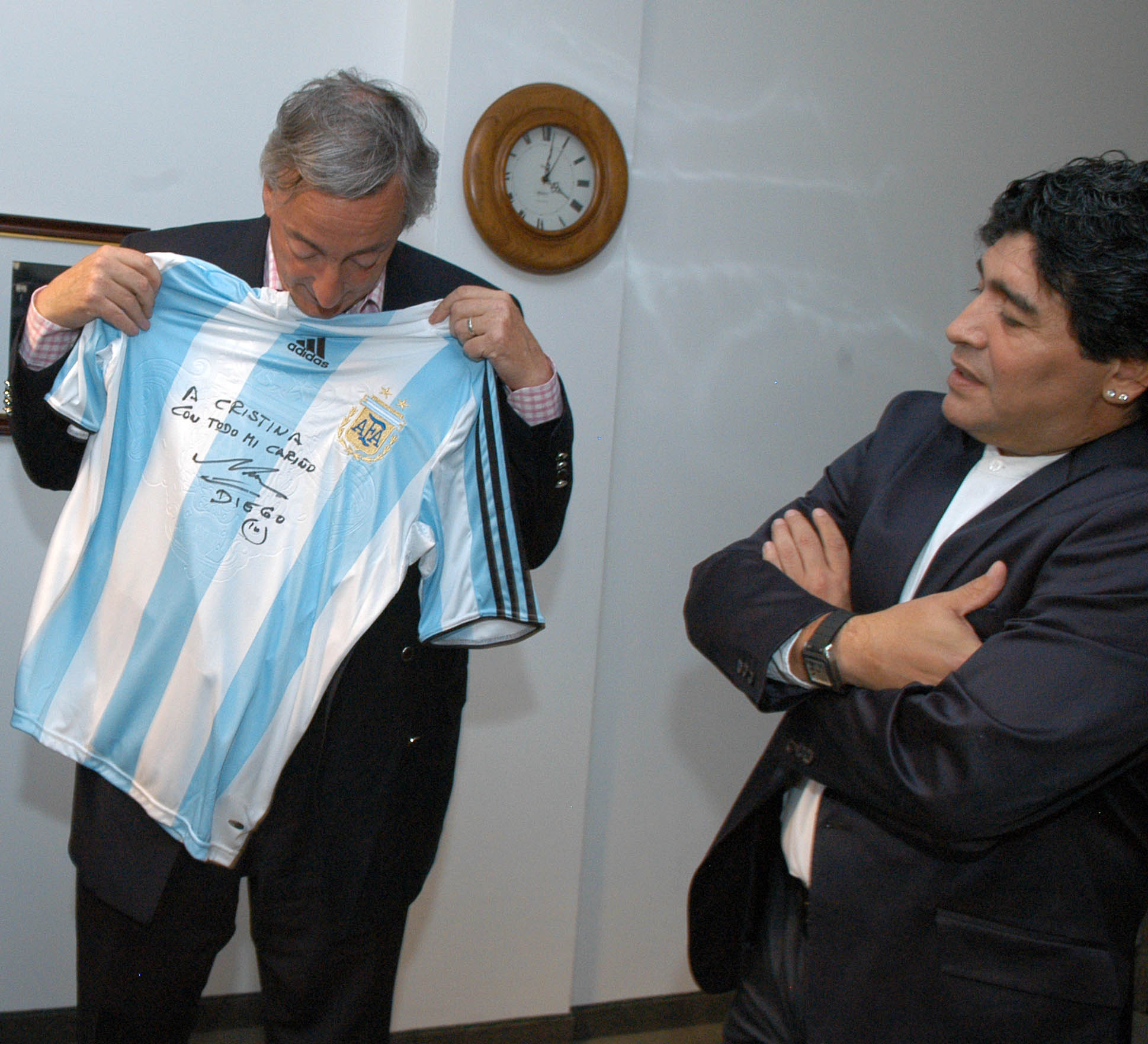
Maradona (right) presenting a signed jersey to the former President of Argentina Néstor Kirchner in December 2007.

Maradona was ideologically left-wing. He supported the establishment of an independent Palestinian state and condemned Israel's military strikes in the Gaza Strip during the 2014 Israel–Gaza conflict, saying: "What Israel is doing to the Palestinians is shameful." He became friends with Cuban president Fidel Castro while receiving treatment on the island, with Castro stating, "Diego is a great friend and very noble, too. There's also no question he's a wonderful athlete and has maintained a friendship with Cuba to no material gain of his own." Maradona had a portrait of Castro tattooed on his left leg and one of Fidel's second in command, fellow Argentine Che Guevara on his right arm. In his autobiography, El Diego, he dedicated the book to various people, including Castro. He wrote: "To Fidel Castro and, through him, all the Cuban people." In 1990, he visited Lenin's Mausoleum in Red Square.

"I'm convinced that if he hadn't been a footballer, he'd've become a revolutionary."

— Filmmaker Emir Kusturica, on Maradona

Maradona voiced support for Bolivia's president Evo Morales and was also a supporter of former Venezuelan president Hugo Chávez. In 2005, he came to Venezuela to meet Chávez, who received him in the presidential Miraflores Palace. After the meeting, Maradona said that he had come to meet a "great man" (un grande, which can also mean "a big man", in Spanish), but had instead met a gigantic man (un gigante). He also stated, "I believe in Chávez, I am a Chavista. Everything Fidel does, everything Chávez does, for me is the best." Maradona was Chávez's guest of honour at the opening game of the 2007 Copa América held in Venezuela. In a 2017 interview, Maradona praised Russian president Vladimir Putin and considered him, along with Chavez and Castro, to be among the best political leaders in the world, stating: "Putin is a man who can bring peace to many in this world. He's a phenomenon; simply a phenomenon".

Many sportsmen claim to be champions of the people, but Maradona's populism is underwritten by his itinerary—the proletarian strongholds of Buenos Aires, Naples, and now Havana.

— Martin Amis writing for The Guardian, 2004.

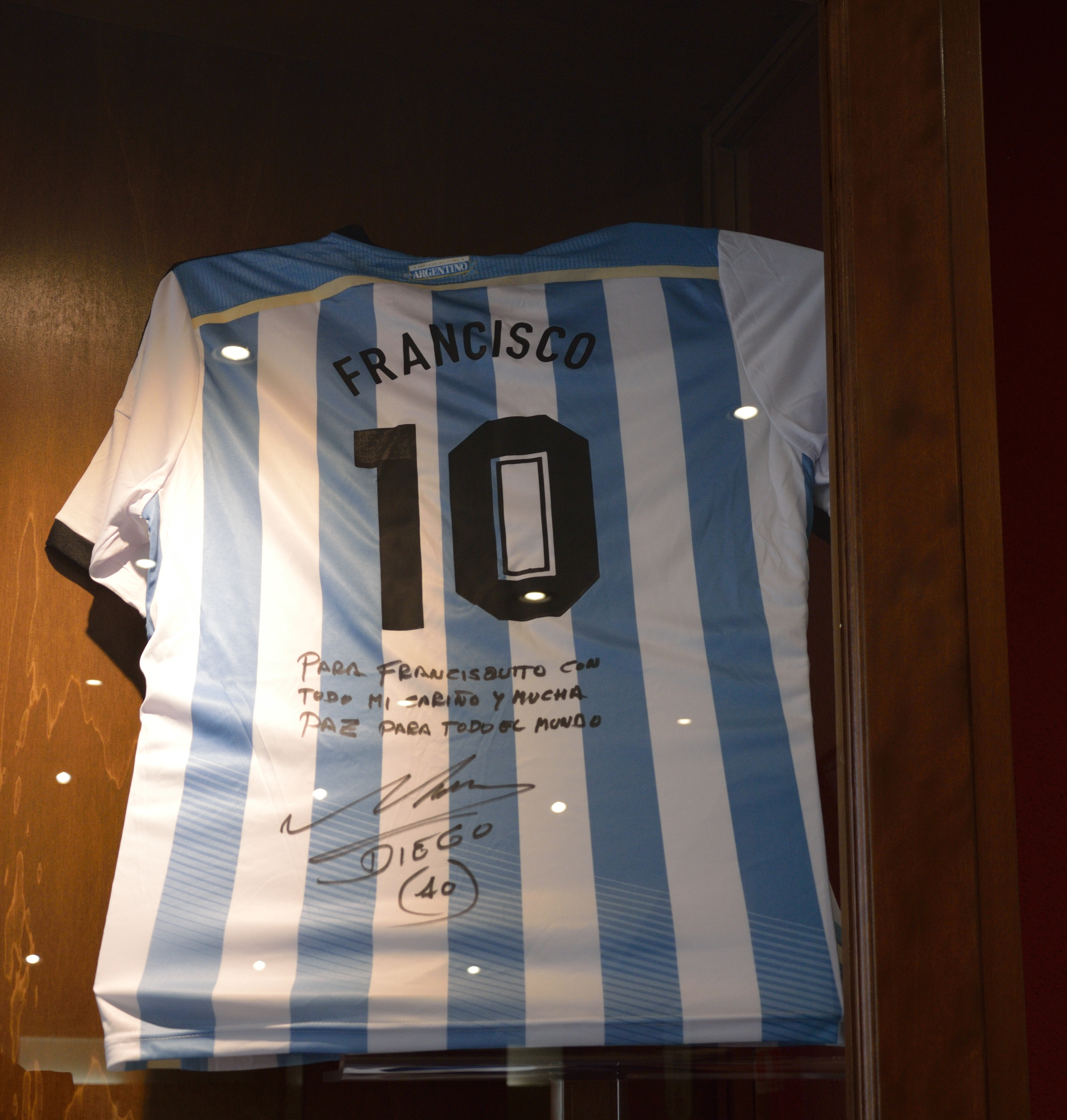
Having returned to his Catholic faith, Maradona donated a signed Argentina jersey to Pope Francis, and it is kept in one of the Vatican Museums.

In 2004, Maradona participated in a protest against the US-led war in Iraq. Maradona declared his opposition to what he identified as imperialism, particularly during the 2005 Summit of the Americas in Mar del Plata, Argentina. There he protested George W. Bush's presence in Argentina, wearing a T-shirt labelled "STOP BUSH" (with the "s" in "Bush" being replaced with a swastika) and referring to Bush as "human garbage". In August 2007, Maradona went further, making an appearance on Chávez's weekly television show Aló Presidente and saying, "I hate everything that comes from the United States. I hate it with all my strength." By December 2008, Maradona seemed to adopt a more positive US attitude and expressed admiration for Bush's successor, then-President-elect Barack Obama, for whom he had great expectations. However, in 2017, Maradona was critical of President Donald Trump and called him "a cartoon character". With his poor shanty town (villa miseria) upbringing, Maradona cultivated a man-of-the-people persona. During a meeting with Pope John Paul II at the Vatican in 1987, they clashed on the issue of wealth disparity, with Maradona stating, "I argued with him because I was in the Vatican and I saw all these golden ceilings and afterwards I heard the Pope say the Church was worried about the welfare of poor kids. Sell your ceiling then, amigo, do something!" In September 2014, Maradona met with Pope Francis in Rome, crediting Francis for inspiring him to return to religion after many years away; he stated: "We should all imitate Pope Francis. If each one of us gives something to someone else, no one in the world would be starving."

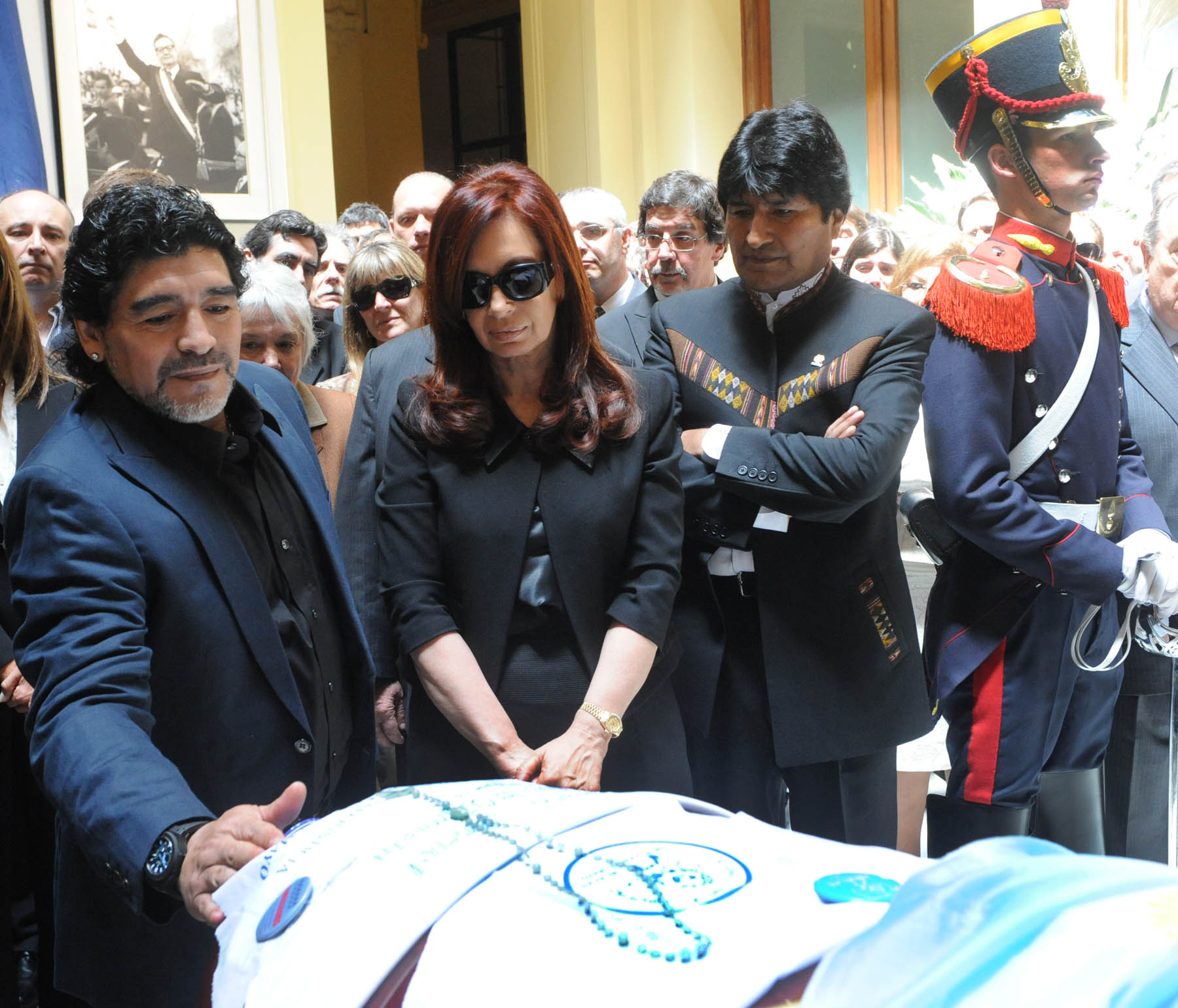
Maradona, then-president Cristina Fernández de Kirchner and Evo Morales, at the funeral of former President of Argentina Néstor Kirchner, 28 October 2010.

In December 2007, Maradona presented a signed shirt with a message of support to the people of Iran: it is displayed in the Iranian Ministry of Foreign Affairs' museum. In April 2013, Maradona visited the tomb of Hugo Chávez and urged Venezuelans to elect the late leader's designated successor, Nicolás Maduro, to continue the socialist leader's legacy; "Continue the struggle," Maradona said on television. Maradona attended Maduro's final campaign rally in Caracas, signing footballs and kicking them to the crowd, and presented Maduro with an Argentina jersey. Having visited Chávez's tomb with Maradona, Maduro said, "Speaking with Diego was very emotional because comandante Chávez also loved him very much." Maradona participated and danced at the electoral campaign rally during the 2018 presidential elections in Venezuela. During the 2019 Venezuelan presidential crisis, the Mexican Football Federation fined him for violating their code of ethics and dedicating a team victory to Nicolás Maduro.

Maradona in his 2000 autobiography Yo Soy El Diego, linked the "Hand of God" goal against England at the 1986 World Cup to the Falklands War: "Although we had said before the game that football had nothing to do with the Malvinas [Falklands] War, we knew they had killed a lot of Argentine boys there, killed them like little birds. And this was revenge." In October 2015, Maradona thanked Queen Elizabeth II and the Houses of Parliament in London for giving him the chance to provide "true justice" as head of an organisation designed to help young children. In a video released on his official Facebook page, Maradona confirmed he would accept their nomination for him to become Latin American director for the non-governmental organisation Football for Unity.

=== Associations with Camorra figures ===
During his time at Napoli, Maradona attracted controversy over his association with members of the Giuliano clan, a Camorra organisation based in the Forcella district of Naples. He was photographed at the home of Carmine Giuliano, brother of Luigi Giuliano, the clan's boss. The photographs were discovered during a police search of Carmine Giuliano's residence and became public in September 1989.

On 28 September 1989, Maradona was questioned as a witness by prosecutor Federico Cafiero de Raho. He was neither under investigation nor charged in connection with the matter. Maradona acknowledged knowing Carmine Giuliano but stated that he had been taken to a gathering by Napoli supporters' leader Gennaro Montuori and had been unaware of the identities of many of those present. He also denied having sought protection from organised crime.

In a 2017 Italian television interview conducted by Maurizio Costanzo, Maradona reiterated that he had not known some of the people photographed with him were Camorra members. He also recalled that, following reports in 1987 of threats against his daughters if he failed to return to Naples, Carmine Giuliano had reassured him that they would not be harmed.

=== Tax dispute ===
Maradona was involved in a lengthy tax dispute with the Italian authorities concerning payments received during his time at Napoli. The controversy originated from investigations into payments made by the club between 1985 and 1990, allegedly involving companies based in Liechtenstein. According to Italian tax authorities, portions of Maradona's remuneration were channelled through foreign companies under arrangements involving image rights and sponsorship agreements. The authorities maintained that these payments constituted additional employment income and should therefore have been subject to Italian income tax.

In a 2014 investigation by the Italian television programme Report, tax specialist Carlo Pontesilli stated that Napoli had transferred approximately 24.5 billion lire to a Liechtenstein-based company belonging to Maradona between 1985 and 1990. Although Maradona's regular salary was paid and taxed in Italy, the additional payments formed the basis of the tax authorities' claims. Interviewed for the programme, Maradona acknowledged that the arrangements had resulted in lower taxes, but maintained that their organisation had been the responsibility of Napoli president Corrado Ferlaino and his representative Coppola, rather than his own initiative.

The dispute also involved former Napoli players Careca and Alemão. Napoli and the two Brazilian players resolved their respective tax disputes through a tax amnesty in 2002, whereas Maradona's case remained unresolved. Maradona consistently denied being personally responsible for the alleged unpaid taxes and argued that Napoli, as his employer, had been responsible for the relevant tax obligations.

In March 2009, Italian officials announced that Maradona still owed the Italian government €37 million in taxes, €23.5 million of which was accrued interest on his original debt. They reported that at that point, Maradona had paid only €42,000, two luxury watches and a set of earrings.

Following years of legal proceedings, the Supreme Court of Cassation ruled in March 2021 that Maradona could benefit from the tax settlement previously obtained by Napoli, allowing his tax position to be reconsidered in light of that settlement.

In December 2023, the Court of Cassation upheld Maradona's appeal and overturned an earlier ruling against him, a decision made public in January 2024. The ruling was widely reported as clearing Maradona posthumously of the tax evasion allegations, and his lawyer, Angelo Pisani, maintained that he had never been a tax evader. However, the court referred the case back to the regional tax court in Campania for the calculation of any outstanding liabilities and legal costs.

== Death ==
Newspaper covers after Maradona's death

"There will be none like him" on Clarín.

"Maradona in the hands of God" on Metro.

On 2 November 2020, Maradona was admitted to a hospital in La Plata, sent by his doctor for anemia, dehydration, depression, and for not being willing to eat; however, his condition was said to be not serious. A day later, he underwent emergency brain surgery to treat a subdural hematoma. On 6 November, he was sedated after suffering from "withdrawal symptoms from alcohol dependency". He was released on 12 November and was supervised by doctors as an outpatient. On 25 November 2020, Maradona suffered cardiac arrest and died in his sleep at his home in Dique Luján, Buenos Aires Province, Argentina.

An autopsy confirmed that he did not have any alcohol or narcotic drugs in his body at the time of death. However, it did confirm that his kidneys and liver were damaged and that his heart weighed almost twice that of a normal heart and was completely covered in fat and blood clots. His death prompted a criminal investigation into the medical care he had received.

Maradona's coffin – draped in Argentina's national flag and three Maradona number 10 shirts (Argentinos Juniors, Boca Juniors and Argentina) – lay in state at the Casa Rosada, with mourners filing past his coffin. On 26 November, Maradona's wake, which was attended by tens of thousands of people, was cut short by his family as his coffin was relocated from the rotunda of the Presidential Palace after fans took over an inner courtyard and also clashed with police. The same day, a private funeral service was held and Maradona was buried next to his parents at the Jardín de Bella Vista cemetery in Bella Vista, Buenos Aires.

=== Tributes ===
"I have lost a great friend and the world has lost a legend. There's still so much to be said, but for now, may God give strength to his relatives. One day I hope we can play football together in heaven."

— Pelé paying tribute following Maradona's death

In a statement on social media, the Argentine Football Association expressed "its deepest sorrow for the death of our legend", adding: "You will always be in our hearts." President Alberto Fernández announced three days of national mourning. UEFA and CONMEBOL announced that every match in the Champions League, Europa League, Copa Libertadores, and Copa Sudamericana would hold a moment of silence prior to kickoff. Boca Juniors' game was postponed in respect to Maradona. Other confederations followed suit, with every fixture observing a minute of silence, starting with the AFC Champions League's fixtures. In addition to the minute of silence in Serie A, an image of Maradona was projected on stadium screens in the 10th minute of play.

In Naples, the Stadio San Paolo – officially renamed Stadio Diego Armando Maradona on 4 December 2020 – was illuminated at night in honour of Maradona, with numerous fans gathering outside the stadium placing murals and paintings as a tribute. Both Napoli owner Aurelio De Laurentiis and the mayor of Naples Luigi de Magistris expressed their desire to rename their stadium after Maradona, which was unanimously approved by Naples City Council. Prior to Napoli's Europa League match against Rijeka the day after Maradona's death, all of the Napoli players wore shirts with "Maradona 10" on the back of them, before observing a minute of silence. Many celebrities both in football and outside football also paid tribute to Maradona.

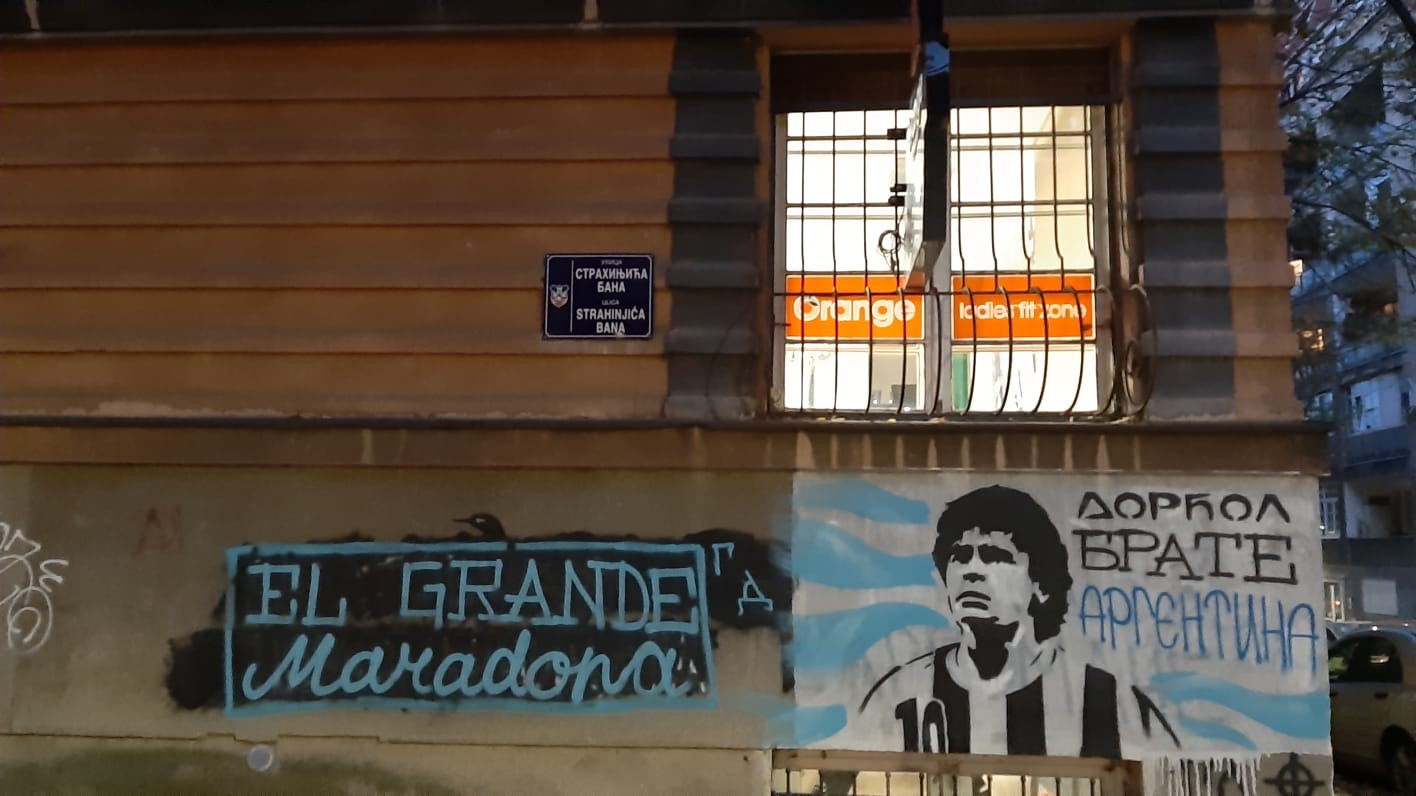
Mural in Belgrade, Serbia weeks after his death.

On 27 November 2020, the Aditya School of Sports in Barasat, Kolkata, India named their cricket stadium after Maradona. Three years earlier Maradona had conducted a workshop with 100 kids in the stadium and played a charity match at the same venue with former Indian cricket captain, Sourav Ganguly. The AFA announced that the 2020 Copa de la Liga Profesional, which is the debut season of Copa de la Liga Profesional, would be renamed Copa Diego Armando Maradona. In a rugby union test match between Argentina and New Zealand on 28 November, as the All Blacks lined up to perform the haka their captain Sam Cane presented a black jersey with Maradona's name and his number 10. On 29 November, compatriot Lionel Messi scored in Barcelona's 4–0 home win over Osasuna in La Liga, dedicating his goal to Maradona by revealing a Newell's Old Boys shirt worn by the latter under his own, and subsequently pointing to the sky. On 30 November, after Boca Juniors opened the scoring against Newell's Old Boys at La Bombonera, the club's players paid an emotional tribute by laying a Maradona jersey in front of his private suite where his daughter Dalma was present.

=== Aftermath ===
In April 2021, a medical board investigating Maradona's death described the care he had received after leaving hospital as "inadequate, deficient and reckless". It concluded that he had been dying for around 12 hours before his death and had not been properly monitored. The following May, seven healthcare professionals were charged with homicide in connection with his death. In June 2022, a judge ordered eight members of his medical team to stand trial; the defendants denied responsibility for his death. The decision was upheld by the Court of Appeals and Guarantees of San Isidro in April 2023, with the accused facing sentences of between eight and 25 years in prison if convicted.

The trial began on 11 March 2025, but was declared a mistrial in May after one of the judges stepped down over her participation in a documentary about the proceedings. A retrial of seven healthcare professionals began in San Isidro on 14 April 2026. On 22 October 2026, at the conclusion of the hearings, physician Pedro Di Spagna was acquitted after prosecutors withdrew their accusation and the private complainants did not seek a conviction. The court scheduled its verdict for the six remaining defendants for 22 December 2026.

== Legacy ==
=== Cultural influence ===
Murals and tributes to Maradona in the Quartieri Spagnoli district of Naples, pictured in 2023.

In Argentina, Maradona is considered a cultural icon. Among the earliest book-length studies of his sociological significance was Gustavo Bernstein's Maradona, Iconografía de la patria (1997), which presents Maradona as a national myth and a symbol of Argentine identity. The author noted that "No one embodies our essence better. No one bears our emblem more nobly... Argentina is Maradona, Maradona is Argentina."

Maradona's cultural standing has also been interpreted in terms of social class. Sociologist Pablo Alabarces describes his popular mythology as the product of a combination of exceptional sporting ability, his impoverished origins, confrontations with powerful opponents and institutions, and repeated episodes of decline and recovery. Alabarces relates the affection for Maradona to identification among working-class and socially subordinate groups, while also acknowledging that his appeal crossed class and national boundaries.

The victory over England in 1986 also acquired significance in the aftermath of Argentina's defeat in the 1982 Falklands War. Maradona later described the result as a form of symbolic revenge for the conflict.

In leading his nation to the 1986 World Cup, and in particular his performance and two goals in the quarter-final against England, Guillem Balagué writes: "That Sunday in Mexico City, the world saw one man single-handedly – in more than one sense of the phrase – lift the mood of a depressed and downtrodden nation into the stratosphere. With two goals in the space of four minutes, he allowed them to dare to dream that they, like him, could be the best in the world. He did it first by nefarious and then spellbindingly brilliant means. In those moments, he went from star player to legend."

Literary scholar Mariano Siskind has interpreted Maradona's performances at the 1986 World Cup as creating brief moments of shared community during Argentina's early transition to democracy. He distinguished this collective attachment from nationalism alone, and linked the public grief at Maradona's death to supporters' memories of their own lives and of the happiness associated with watching him play.

"Maradona is a God to the people of Naples. Maradona changed history."

— Naples native Fabio Cannavaro.

In Naples, Maradona's influence was closely associated with civic identity and the relationship between the city and the rest of Italy. He publicly defended the poorer Italian south against the wealthier north. Writing for Treccani, Stefania Elisa Ghezzi linked his reception to the identification between football club and city, through which sporting victories were experienced as collective achievements and a form of civic redemption. She also noted the association of Maradona with the Neapolitan scugnizzo, the resourceful and irreverent street child, and with qualities such as creativity, generosity and indiscipline projected onto the city's own identity.

This identification persisted after his playing career through supporters' songs, murals, mosaics and stories passed down in the city's collective memory. Ghezzi described Maradona's name as entering everyday speech as a reference point for exceptional ability, while chants dedicated to him expressed an enduring sense of belonging shared by the player, the club and Naples.

Since 1986, it has been common for Argentines abroad to hear Maradona's name as a token of recognition, even in remote places.

There is a documented phenomenon of Brazilians being named in honour of Maradona, an example being footballer Diego Costa.

In 2022, the jersey Maradona wore during the 1986 World Cup quarter-final—the match in which he scored the "Hand of God" and "Goal of the Century" goals—was sold at auction for £7.1 million ($9.3 million), a record price for a piece of football memorabilia.

=== Veneration and religious imagery ===
Concerning the idolatry that exists in his country, former teammate Jorge Valdano said:

At the time that Maradona retired from active football, he left Argentina traumatized. Maradona was more than just a great footballer. He was a special compensation factor for a country that in a few years lived through several military dictatorships and social frustrations of all kinds. Maradona offered to Argentines a way out of their collective frustration, and that's why people there love him as a divine figure.

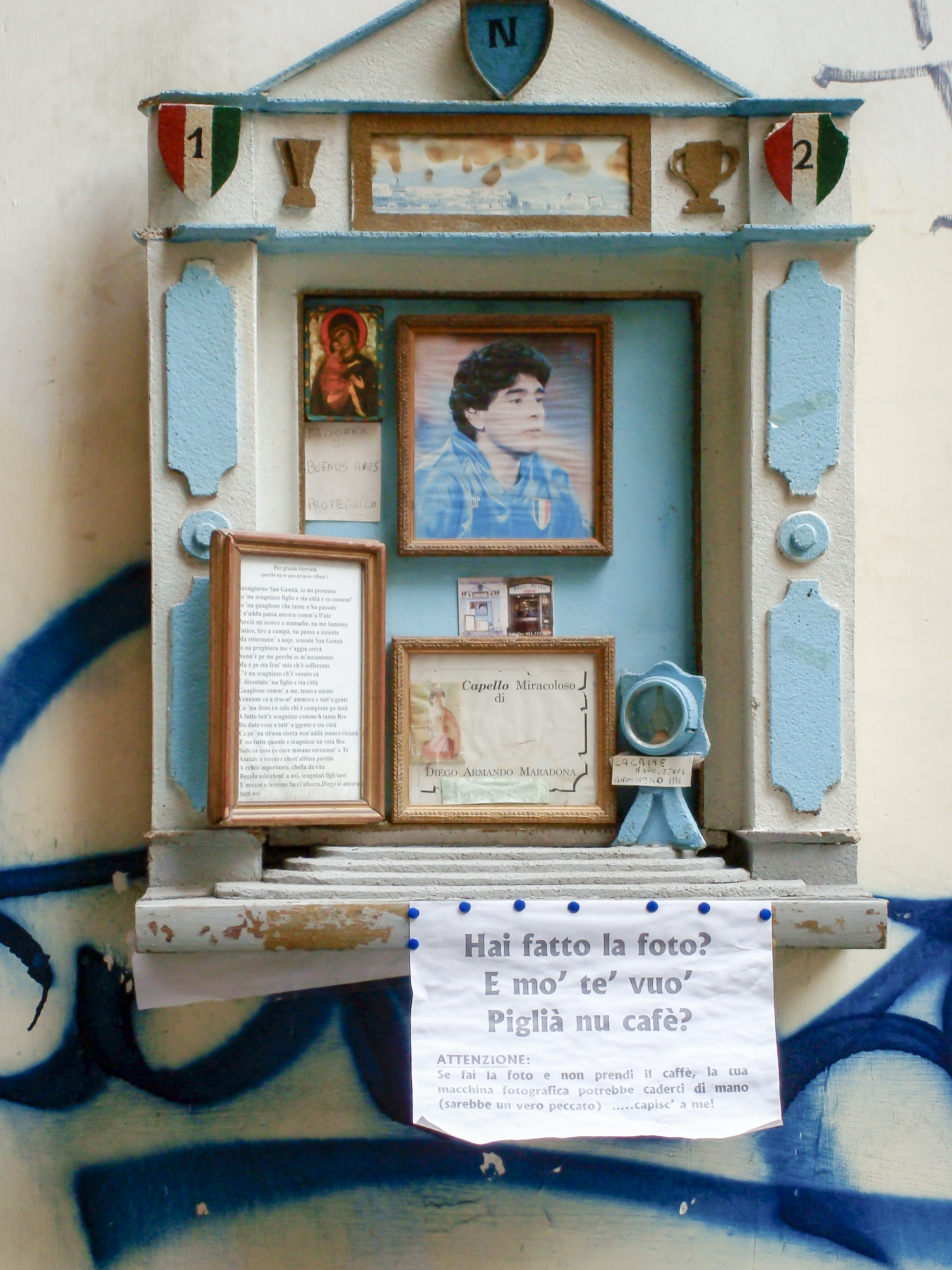
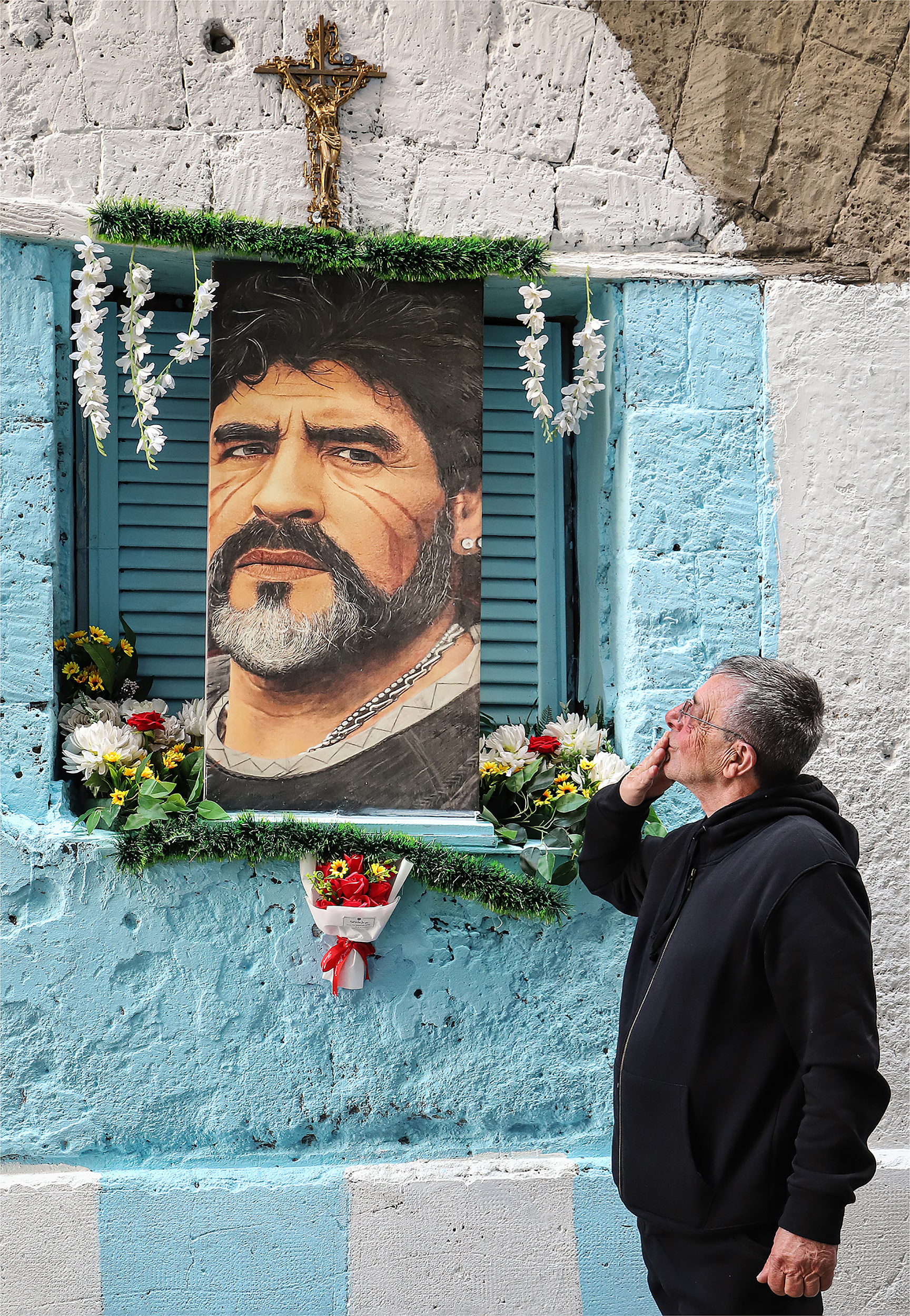
Shrines dedicated to Maradona in Naples.

In Naples, Maradona inspired a form of popular devotion likened to the veneration of a saint, expressed through shrines, murals and religious imagery. At Bar Nilo in the city's historic centre, an altar dedicated to him displays what is claimed to be a strand of his hair, labelled "miraculous hair". His likeness also appears in traditional Neapolitan nativity scenes alongside Christian figures.

The use of such imagery has been linked to Naples' existing traditions of votive shrines and devotion to local saints. Writing in Apollo, Sophia Seymour compared the glass vessel at Bar Nilo with the ampoule associated with the blood of San Gennaro, the city's patron saint. She also documented the production of winged Maradona figurines by artisans on Via San Gregorio Armeno after his death, extending the practice of incorporating contemporary figures into Neapolitan nativity scenes.

In a 2024 study of Maradona's commemoration in Naples, cultural scholar Maria Alina Asavei interpreted these practices as a form of popular sainthood. She documented representations of Maradona with a halo and images accompanied by candles and flowers, distinguishing devotional uses from humorous and commercial uses of the same religious imagery.

After his death in November 2020, supporters created a makeshift shrine outside Napoli's stadium, leaving scarves, flowers and church candles, while images of him continued to be displayed beside those of saints in shop windows.

In Rosario, Argentina, fans founded the parody religion known as the "Church of Maradona" in October 1998. The organisation adapts Christian traditions to Maradona's life and career, celebrating his birthday on 30 October as Christmas and counting its years from his birth in 1960. Its observances include prayers modelled on Christian texts, ten commandments centred on football and loyalty to Maradona, and mock baptisms in which participants recreate the "Hand of God" goal.

Co-founder Alejandro Verón told Reuters in 2003 that he regarded this devotion as compatible with Roman Catholic belief, distinguishing faith in Christ from the emotional attachment to Maradona.

=== Media and popular culture ===
Songs dedicated to Maradona include "La Mano de Dios" by El Potro Rodrigo, "Maradona" by Andrés Calamaro, "Para siempre Diego" by Los Ratones Paranoicos, "Francotirador" by Attaque 77, "Maradona Blues" by Charly García, "Santa Maradona (Larchuma Football Club)" by Mano Negra, and "La Vida Tómbola" by Manu Chao. The Tartan Army sing a version of the Hokey Cokey in honour of his Hand of God goal against England.

Films inspired by or about Maradona include The Road to San Diego (2006) and Maradona by Kusturica (2008). In 2019, Asif Kapadia directed the documentary Diego Maradona.

His commercial endorsements included Puma and Coca-Cola, as well as Hitachi. A 2006 advertisement for Guaraná Antarctica, in which he appeared as a Brazil player, prompted controversy in Argentina. In 2010, he appeared in a Louis Vuitton advertisement playing table football with Pelé and Zinedine Zidane.

== Career statistics ==
In senior club and international football, Maradona made a combined 680 appearances and scored 345 goals, averaging 0.51 goals per match. (Note: Attributed to multiple references:)

=== Club ===
Appearances and goals by club, season and competition
Club	Season	League			National cup (Note: Includes Copa del Rey, Coppa Italia)		Continental		Other		Total	
Club	Season	Division	Apps	Goals	Apps	Goals	Apps	Goals	Apps	Goals	Apps	Goals
Argentinos Juniors	1976	Argentine Primera División	11	2	–		–		–		11	2
Argentinos Juniors	1977	Argentine Primera División	49	19	–		–		–		49	19
Argentinos Juniors	1978	Argentine Primera División	35	26	–		–		–		35	26
Argentinos Juniors	1979	Argentine Primera División	26	26	–		–		–		26	26
Argentinos Juniors	1980	Argentine Primera División	45	43	–		–		–		45	43
Argentinos Juniors	Total		166	116	–		–		–		166	116
Boca Juniors	1981	Argentine Primera División	40	28	–		–		–		40	28
Barcelona	1982–83	La Liga	20	11	5	3	4 (Note: Appearances in European Cup Winners' Cup)	5	6 (Note: Appearances in the 1983 Copa de la Liga)	4	35	23
Barcelona	1983–84	La Liga	16	11	4	1	3	3	–		23	15
Barcelona	Total		36	22	9	4	7	8	6	4	58	38
Napoli	1984–85	Serie A	30	14	6	3	–		–		36	17
Napoli	1985–86	Serie A	29	11	2	2	–		–		31	13
Napoli	1986–87	Serie A	29	10	10	7	2 (Note: Appearances in UEFA Cup)	0	–		41	17
Napoli	1987–88	Serie A	28	15	9	6	2 (Note: Appearances in European Cup)	0	–		39	21
Napoli	1988–89	Serie A	26	9	12	7	12	3	–		50	19
Napoli	1989–90	Serie A	28	16	3	2	5	0	–		36	18
Napoli	1990–91	Serie A	18	6	3	2	4	2	1 (Note: Appearance in the 1990 Supercoppa Italiana)	0	26	10
Napoli	Total		188	81	45	29	25	5	1	0	259	115
Sevilla	1992–93	La Liga	26	5	4	2	–		–		30	7
Newell's Old Boys	1993–94	Argentine Primera División	5	0	–		–		–		5	0
Boca Juniors	1995–96	Argentine Primera División	24	5	–		–		–		24	5
Boca Juniors	1996–97	Argentine Primera División	1	0	–		–		1 (Note: Appearance in the 1997 Supercopa Libertadores)	0	2	0
Boca Juniors	1997–98	Argentine Primera División	5	2	–		–		–		5	2
Boca Juniors	Total		70	35	–		–		1	0	71	35
Career total			491	259	58	35	32	13	8	4	589	311

=== International ===
Appearances and goals by national team, year and competition
Team	Year	Competitive		Friendly		Total	
Team	Year	Apps	Goals	Apps	Goals	Apps	Goals
Argentina U20	1977	3 (Note: Appearances in the 1977 South American U-20 Championship)	0	–		3	0
Argentina U20	1978	–		–		–	
Argentina U20	1979	11 (Note: Five appearances and one goal in the 1979 South American U-20 Championship, six appearances and six goals in the 1979 FIFA World Youth Championship)	7	1	1	12	8
Argentina U20	Total	14	7	1	1	15	8
Argentina	1977	–		3	0	3	0
Argentina	1978	–		1	0	1	0
Argentina	1979	2 (Note: Appearances in the 1979 Copa América)	1	6	2	8	3
Argentina	1980	–		10	7	10	7
Argentina	1981	2 (Note: Appearances in the 1980 Mundialito)	1	–		2	1
Argentina	1982	5 (Note: Appearances in the 1982 World Cup)	2	5	0	10	2
Argentina	1983	–		–		–	
Argentina	1984	–		–		–	
Argentina	1985	6 (Note: Appearances in the 1986 FIFA World Cup qualification)	3	4	3	10	6
Argentina	1986	7 (Note: Appearances in the 1986 World Cup)	5	3	2	10	7
Argentina	1987	4 (Note: Appearances in the 1987 Copa América)	3	2	1	6	4
Argentina	1988	2 (Note: Appearances in the Four Nations Tournament)	1	1	0	3	1
Argentina	1989	6 (Note: Appearances in the 1989 Copa América)	0	1	0	7	0
Argentina	1990	7 (Note: Appearances in the 1990 World Cup)	0	3	1	10	1
Argentina	1991	–		–		–	
Argentina	1992	–		–		–	
Argentina	1993	3 (Note: One appearance in the 1993 Artemio Franchi Cup, two appearances in the 1994 FIFA World Cup qualification)	0	1	0	4	0
Argentina	1994	2 (Note: Appearances in the 1994 World Cup)	1	5	1	7	2
Argentina	Total	46	17	45	17	91	34
Career total		60	24	46	18	106	42

== Managerial statistics ==
Team	From	To	Record				
Team	From	To	G	W	D	L	Win %
Textil Mandiyú	January 1994	June 1994	12	1	6	5	8.33
Racing Club	May 1995	November 1995	11	2	6	3	18.18
Argentina	November 2008	July 2010	24	18	0	6	75.00
Al-Wasl	May 2011	July 2012	23	11	3	9	47.83
Fujairah	April 2017	April 2018	11	7	3	1	63.64
Dorados	September 2018	June 2019	38	20	9	9	52.63
Gimnasia de La Plata	September 2019	November 2020	21	8	4	9	38.10
Total			140	67	31	42	47.86

== Honours ==
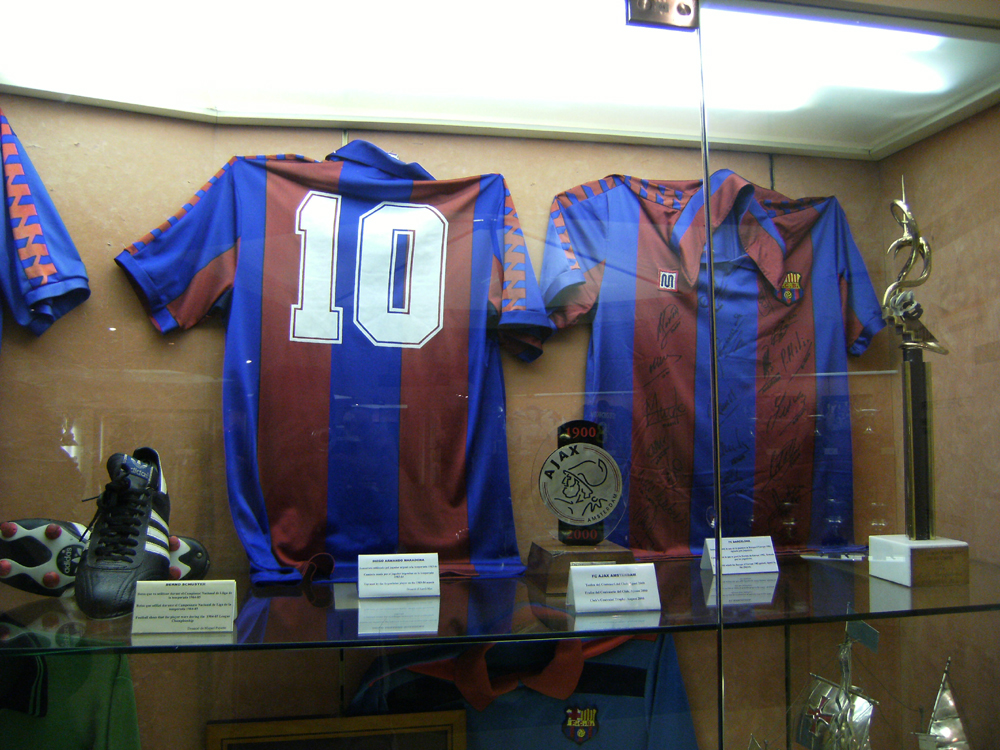
Diego Maradona's blaugrana shirt on display in the FC Barcelona Museum.

Boca Juniors

- Primera División: 1981 Metropolitano

Barcelona (Note: The 1983 Supercopa de España is not listed among Maradona's honours, as he did not feature in either leg due to injury, although Barcelona won the title.)

- Copa del Rey: 1982–83
- Copa de la Liga: 1983

Napoli

- Serie A: 1986–87, 1989–90
- Coppa Italia: 1986–87
- Supercoppa Italiana: 1990
- UEFA Cup: 1988–89

Argentina U20

- FIFA World Youth Championship: 1979

Argentina

- FIFA World Cup: 1986
- Artemio Franchi Cup: 1993

Individual

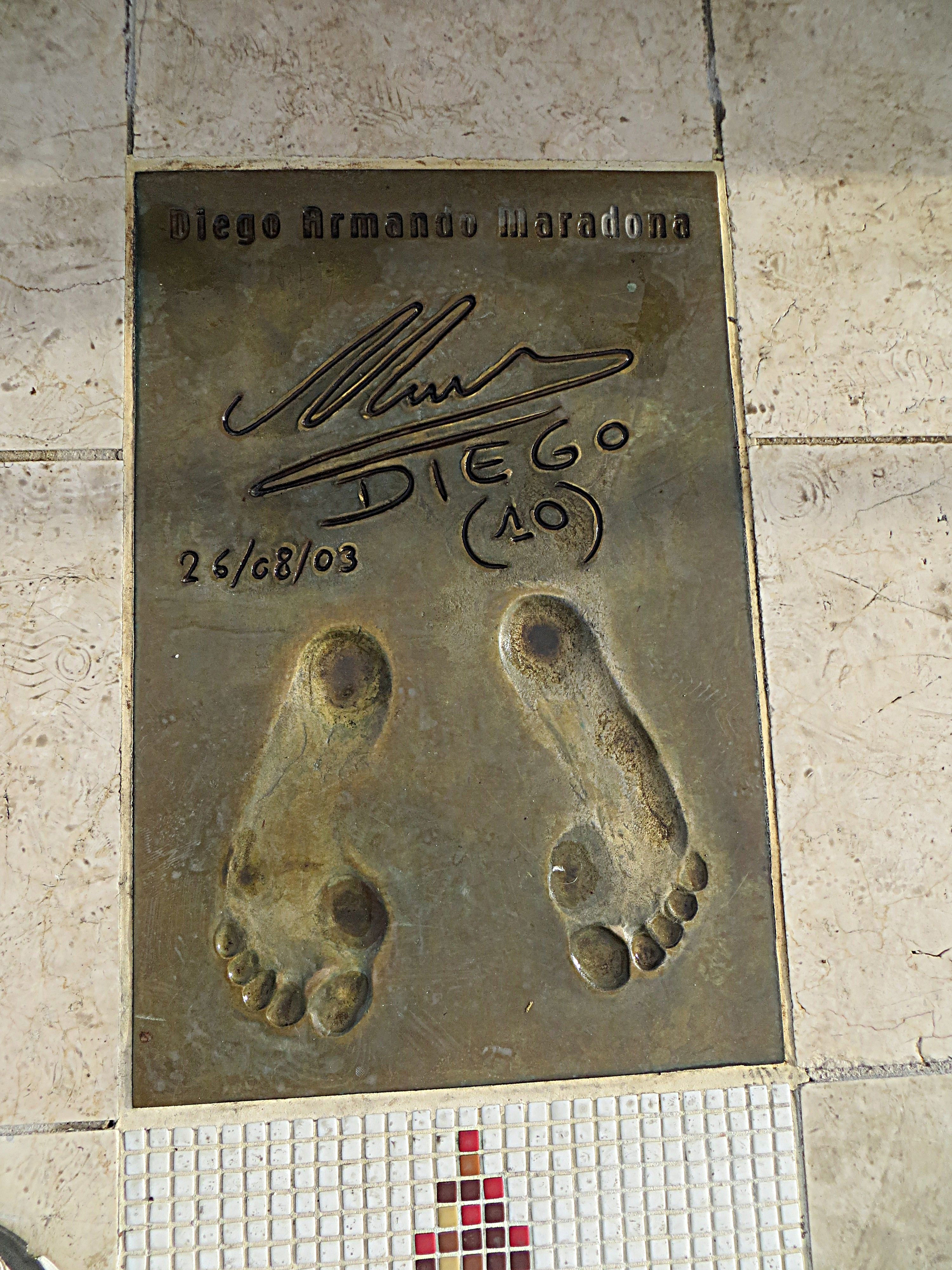
Maradona's Golden Foot award in "The Champions Promenade" on the seafront of the Principality of Monaco.

- Argentine Primera División top scorers: 1978 Metropolitano, 1979 Metropolitano, 1979 Nacional, 1980 Metropolitano, 1980 Nacional
- FIFA World Youth Championship Golden Ball: 1979
- FIFA World Youth Championship Silver Shoe: 1979
- Olimpia de Oro: 1979, 1986
- Argentine Footballer of the Year: 1979, 1980, 1981, 1986
- El Mundo South American Footballer of the Year: 1979, 1980, 1986, 1989, 1990, 1992
- El Gráfico Footballer of the Americas: 1980, 1981
- Eric Batty's World XI: 1984, 1987
- Serie A Team of The Year: 1985, 1986, 1987, 1988
- Guerin d'Oro (Serie A Footballer of the Year): 1985
- Onze de Onze: 1985, 1986, 1987, 1988, 1989
- FIFA World Cup Golden Ball: 1986
- FIFA World Cup Silver Shoe: 1986
- FIFA World Cup All-Star Team: 1986, 1990
- L'Équipe Champion of Champions: 1986
- La Gazzetta dello Sport Athlete of the Year: 1986
- Agence France-Presse Athlete of the Year: 1986
- Associated Press Athlete of the Year: 1986
- United Press International Athlete of the Year: 1986
- Corriere dello Sport Athlete of the Year: 1986
- Onze d'Or: 1986, 1987
- La Gazzetta dello Sport Footballer of the Year: 1987, 1988
- Capocannoniere (Serie A top scorer): 1987–88
- Coppa Italia top scorer: 1987–88
- FIFA World Cup Bronze Ball: 1990
- El País Ideal Team of the Americas: 1993, 1995
- Ballon d'Or for services to football (France Football): 1995
- World Team of the 20th Century: 1998
- Argentine Sports Writers' Sportsman of the Century: 1999
- Marca Leyenda: 1999
- Number 10 retired by Napoli football team as a recognition to his contribution to the club: 2000
- FIFA Player of the Century: 2000
- FIFA Goal of the Century (for his second goal against England in 1986 FIFA World Cup quarter-final): 2002
- FIFA World Cup Dream Team: 2002
- Golden Foot: 2003, as football legend
- FIFA 100: 2004
- Argentine Senate "Domingo Faustino Sarmiento" recognition for lifetime achievement: 2005
- Player of the 20th Century, by Globe Soccer Awards: 2012
- World Soccer magazine's Greatest XI of All Time: 2013
- Italian Football Hall of Fame: 2014
- AFA Team of All Time: 2015
- International Federation of Football History & Statistics (IFFHS) Legends
- Ballon d'Or Dream Team: 2020
- IFFHS All-time Men's Dream Team: 2021
- IFFHS South America Men's Team of All Time: 2021

== Works ==
- Maradona, Diego Armando (2000). Yo Soy el Diego [I Am the Diego] (in Spanish). Planeta Pub. Corp. ISBN 84-08036-74-2.
- Maradona, Diego (2016). México 86 : así ganamos la copa : mi mundial, mi verdad (in Spanish) (1st ed.). Barcelona: Debate. ISBN 978-84-9992-627-8. OCLC 953395867.

== See also ==
- List of association football families
- List of most valuable celebrity memorabilia
- 1989 warm up to Live Is Life
- List of FIFA World Cup top goalscorers

== Notes ==
Awards and achievements
Preceded by Steve Cram	United Press International; Athlete of the Year; 1986	Succeeded by Ben Johnson
Preceded by Hugo Porta	Olimpia de Oro; 1986	Succeeded by Gabriela Sabatini
Preceded by Sergey Bubka	L'Équipe Champion of Champions; 1986	Succeeded by ~~Ben Johnson~~
