= Claudio Rodríguez (footballer, born 1960) =

Argentine footballer (born 1960)

Personal information
- Full name: Claudio Sergio Rodríguez
- Date of birth: 17 January 1960 (age 66)
- Place of birth: Buenos Aires, Argentina
- Position: Forward

Youth career
- Argentinos Juniors
- San Lorenzo

Senior career*
Years	Team	Apps	(Gls)
1980	San Lorenzo	1	(0)
1981	Argentinos Juniors		
1981–1984	Unión Magdalena		
1984–1985	Estudiantes BA	37	(11)
1986–1987	Atlanta	8	(0)
1987–1988	Deportivo Maipu	19	(2)
1988–1989	Chacarita Juniors	23	(3)
1989–1990	Cipolletti	30	(5)
1990–1992	Talleres RE	48	(3)
1992–1994	Chacarita Juniors	1	(0)
Total		167	(24)

Managerial career
- Chacarita Juniors (youth)
- 2016–2017: Fénix (youth)
- 2018–2021: Estudiantes BA (youth)
- 2021–2022: Midland (assistant)
- 2022: Unión Magdalena (assistant)
- 2022–2023: Unión Magdalena
- * Club domestic league appearances and goals

Claudio Sergio Rodríguez (born 17 January 1960) is an Argentine football manager and former player who played as a forward.

== Playing career ==
Born in Buenos Aires, Rodríguez played with Diego Maradona in the youth sides of Argentinos Juniors, named Los Cebollitas. He made his senior debut with San Lorenzo in 1980, before moving abroad in 1981 with Colombian side Unión Magdalena.

Rodríguez returned to his home country in 1984 with Estudiantes de Buenos Aires, and also played with Primera División sides Atlanta, Deportivo Maipu, Chacarita Juniors, Cipolletti and Talleres de Remedios de Escalada. He returned to Chacarita in 1992, before retiring two years later.

== Managerial career ==
After retiring, Rodríguez started working in the youth sides of his last club Chacarita. He was also a youth manager of Fénix and Estudiantes de Buenos Aires, and later worked as an assistant at Midland.

On 2 April 2022, Rodríguez was announced as the assistant manager of another club he represented as a player, Unión Magdalena. Ten days later, he replaced Carlos Silva as manager of the first team.

Rodríguez managed Unión until 19 May 2023, when he announced his departure from the role.

== Personal life ==
Rodríguez's father Perfecto was also a footballer and a forward.
