= Esteban Laureano Maradona =

- Born: July 4, 1895; Esperanza, Argentina
- Died: January 14, 1995 (aged 99); Rosario, Argentina
- Occupations: Country doctor, naturalist, writer, philanthropist
- Parent(s): Petrona Encarnación Villalba Sosa and Waldino Maradona Garramuño

Esteban Laureano Maradona, popularly known as Doctor Maradona (July 4, 1895 – January 14, 1995), was a country medical doctor, naturalist, writer and philanthropist. Maradona practiced medicine in the rural village of Estanislao del Campo, located in the province of Formosa, for 50 years. Maradona moved to Paraguay during the Chaco War, where he was appointed director of Asunción's Naval Hospital. He also worked with indigenous communities on economic, cultural, humanitarian, and social issues.

Maradona was the author of numerous scientific works on anthropology, rural chronicles, and flora and fauna.

== Publications ==
Some of Maradona's approximately 20 books have not yet been published, though in 1994 the Argentine Congress passed a resolution to edit and donate copies of Maradona's books to public libraries to further his legacy.

=== Published ===
- A través de la selva
- Recuerdos Campesinos.
- Una planta providencial (El yacón).

=== Unpublished ===
- Animales cuadrúpedos americanos (three volumes with illustrations)
- Aves (también tres volúmenes con ilustraciones).
- Dendrología (cinco volúmenes con representaciones gráficas de las especies).
- El problema de la lepra. Profilaxis y colonización.
- El problema del vinal. Propiedades, usos y distribución en Formosa.
- Historia de la ganadería argentina
- Historia de los obreros de las Ciencias Naturales (de botánica y zoología americanas)
- La ciudad muerta (history of the first years of the city of Concepción del río Bermejo).
- Páginas sueltas (periodístico)
- Plantas cauchígenas
- Vocabulario toba-pilagá (more than 3,000 words translated into Spanish).
