= Iglesia Maradoniana =

Parody religion centred around Diego Maradona

Iglesia Maradoniana (Church of Maradona)
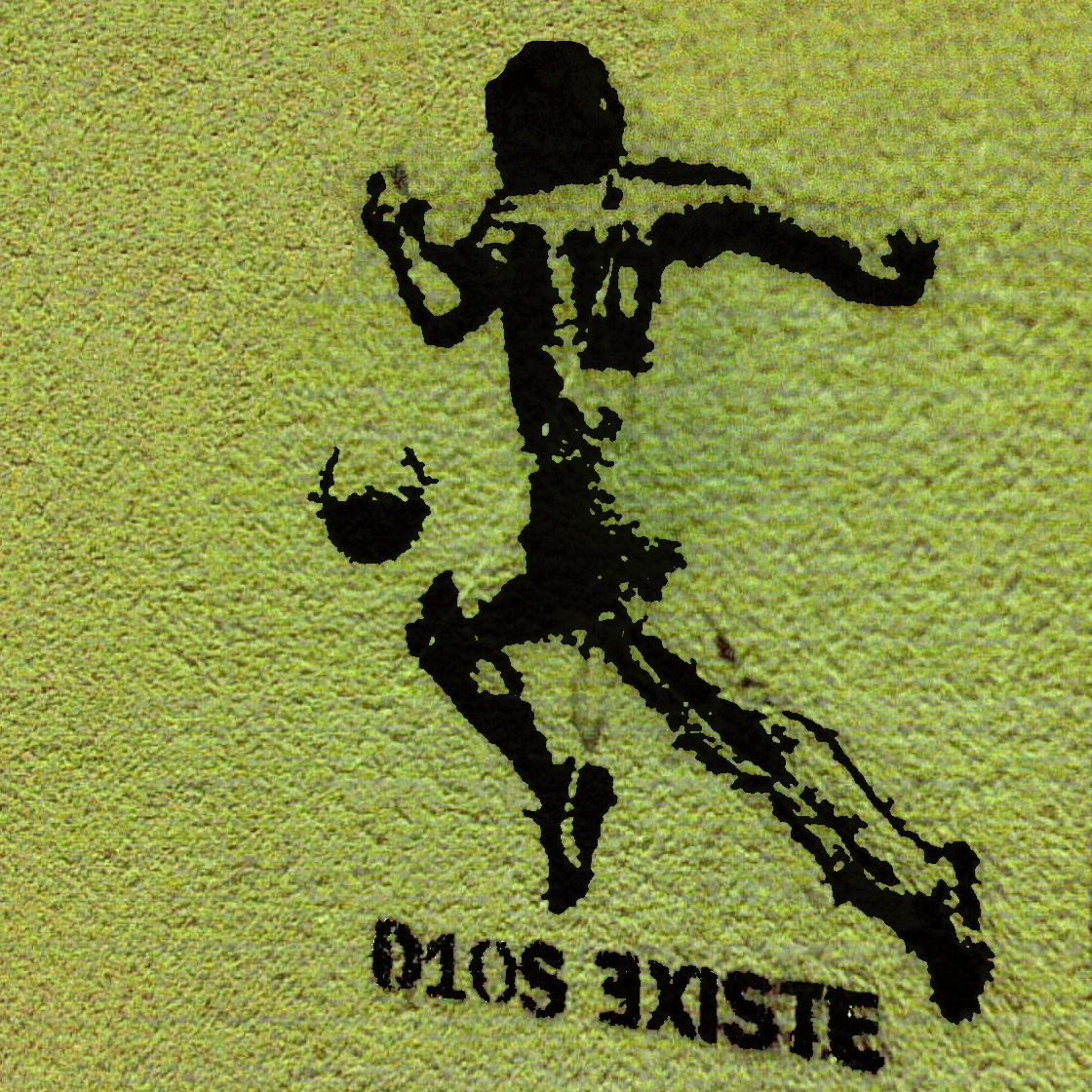
- A Maradonian graffito.
- Abbreviation: IM/CoM
- Type: Christian -style movement
- Orientation: Sport-themed parody religion
- Scripture: Yo soy el Diego de la gente
- Region: Argentina
- Founder: Héctor Campomar; Alejandro Verón; Hernán Amez
- Origin: 30 October 1998; Rosario, Argentina

The Iglesia Maradoniana (literally Church of Maradona or Maradonian Church) is a religion, created by fans of the late Argentine footballer Diego Maradona, whom they believe to be the greatest of all time.

The Church was founded on 30 October 1998 (Maradona's 38th birthday) in the city of Rosario, Argentina by three fans (Héctor Campomar, Alejandro Verón and Hernán Amez). It could be seen as a type of syncretism or as a religion, depending on what religious definition one chooses to use. It was said by Alejandro Verón, one of the founders: "I have a rational religion and that's the Catholic Church and I have a religion passed on my heart and passion and that's Diego Maradona." Supporters of the Church, supposedly from all parts of the world, count the years since Maradona's birth in 1960 with the era designation d. D. (Spanish: después de Diego, lit. 'after Diego').

They also use D10S for Maradona since it fuses Dios ("God") and 10, the number on Maradona's jersey. The church has expanded to other countries such as Spain, Italy, Germany, the United Kingdom, Scotland, Japan, Afghanistan, Peru, Brazil, Chile, Mexico, Uruguay and the United States, among many others. In Spain, for example, it is believed that there are more than 9,000 followers.

== Ten Commandments ==
The "Ten Commandments" of the Iglesia Maradoniana are:

1. The ball is never soiled.
2. Love football above all else.
3. Declare unconditional love for Diego and the beauty of football.
4. Defend the Argentine shirt.
5. Spread the news of Diego's miracles throughout the universe.
6. Honour the temples where he played and his sacred shirts.
7. Don't proclaim Diego as a member of any single team.
8. Preach and spread the principles of the Iglesia Maradoniana.
9. Make "Diego" your middle name.
10. Name your first son "Diego".

== Synthesis ==
The Iglesia Maradoniana, founded in October 1998, claims more than 40,000 members worldwide and regards Diego Armando Maradona as the "God of football." Its calendar is based on Maradona's birth date, and its followers, known as maradonianos, celebrate the new year according to this system. A baptism rite involves heading a football in front of an altered photograph associated with Maradona's famous goal against England in the 1986 World Cup.

== See also ==
- Parody religion
