= 1988–89 SSC Napoli season =

Napoli
1988–89 season
- Owner: Corrado Ferlaino
- President: Corrado Ferlaino
- Head coach: Ottavio Bianchi
- Stadium: San Paolo
- Serie A: 2nd
- Coppa Italia: Runners-up
- UEFA Cup: Winners (In 1989–90 UEFA Cup)
- Top goalscorer: League: Careca (19); All: Careca (27)
Home colours	Away colours	Third colours

SSC Napoli won an international trophy for the first time, defeating Stuttgart 2-1 and drawing 3-3 in the two-legged final. Napoli did not match Inter in the domestic league, but recorded a second place, its fourth consecutive podium finish in the final standings.

== Squad ==
Note: Flags indicate national team as defined under FIFA eligibility rules; some limited exceptions apply. Players may hold more than one non-FIFA nationality.

Pos.	Nation	Player
GK	ITA	Giuliano Giuliani
GK	ITA	Raffaele Di Fusco
DF	ITA	Tebaldo Bigliardi
DF	ITA	Giancarlo Corradini
DF	ITA	Ciro Ferrara
DF	ITA	Giovanni Francini
DF	ITA	Massimo Filardi
DF	ITA	Alessandro Renica
DF	ITA	Giovanni Di Rocco
DF	ITA	Antonio Carannante
MF	ITA	Massimo Crippa

Pos.	Nation	Player
MF	ITA	Fernando De Napoli
MF	BRA	Alemão
MF	ITA	Antonio Bucciarelli
MF	ITA	Francesco Romano
MF	ITA	Luca Fusi
MF	ITA	Maurizio Neri
FW	BRA	Careca
FW	ARG	Diego Maradona
FW	ITA	Andrea Carnevale
FW	ITA	Marco Ferrante
FW	ITA	Simone Giacchetta

=== Transfers ===
In
Pos.	Name	from	Type
MF	Massimo Crippa	Torino	
MF	Alemão	Atlético Madrid	
DF	Giancarlo Corradini	Torino	
GK	Giuliano Giuliani	Hellas Verona	
MF	Luca Fusi	Sampdoria	co-ownership
FW	Simone Giacchetta	Civitanovese	
FW	Maurizio Neri	Ancona Calcio	

Cessioni
R.	Nome	a	Modalità
MF	Salvatore Bagni	Avellino	
GK	Claudio Garella	Udinese Calcio	
DF	Moreno Ferrario	A.S. Roma	loan
FW	Bruno Giordano	Ascoli	loan
MF	Paolo Miano	Pescara	
MF	Luciano Sola	Padova Calcio	
DF	Rosario Pergolizzi	Reggina Calcio	loan

== Competitions ==
=== Serie A ===
==== League table ====
Pos	Team	Pld	W	D	L	GF	GA	GD	Pts	Qualification or relegation
1	Internazionale (C)	34	26	6	2	67	19	+48	58	Qualification to European Cup
2	Napoli	34	18	11	5	57	28	+29	47	Qualification to UEFA Cup
3	Milan (Note: Milan qualified for the 1989–90 European Cup as the 1988–89 European Cup defending champions.)	34	16	14	4	61	25	+36	46	Qualification to European Cup
4	Juventus	34	15	13	6	51	36	+15	43	Qualification to UEFA Cup
5	Sampdoria	34	14	11	9	43	25	+18	39	Qualification to Cup Winners' Cup

Source: 1988–89 Serie A, RSSSF.com
Rules for classification: 1) Points; 2) Head-to-head points; 3) Head-to-head goal difference; 4) Goal difference; 5) Goals scored; 6) Draw.
(C) Champions

==== Results by round ====
Round	1	2	3	4	5	6	7	8	9	10	11	12	13	14	15	16	17	18	19	20	21	22	23	24	25	26	27	28	29	30	31	32	33	34
Ground	A	H	A	H	H	A	H	A	A	H	A	H	A	H	A	H	A	H	A	H	A	A	H	A	H	H	A	H	A	H	A	H	A	H
Result	W	L	W	W	D	W	W	W	W	W	L	W	D	D	W	W	W	D	W	D	W	D	L	D	W	W	D	D	W	L	D	L	D	W
Position	1	7	4	3	3	2	2	2	2	2	2	2	2	2	2	2	2	2	2	2	2	2	2	2	2	2	2	2	2	2	2	2	2	2

Source: Competitive matches
A = Away; H = Home; W = Win; D = Draw; L = Loss; = 1989–90 European Cup; = 1989–90 UEFA Cup

==== Matches ====
9 October 1988 1	Napoli	1–0	Atalanta	Naples
	Giacchetta 90'	Report		Stadium: San Paolo; Attendance: 55 678

16 October 1988 2	Lecce	1–0	Napoli	Lecce
	Baroni 10'	Report		Stadium: Via del Mare; Attendance: 17 450

23 October 1988 3	Napoli	8–2	Pescara	Naples
	Careca 3, 60'; Carnevale 7, 51, 53'; Maradona 36, 84'; Alemão 39'	Report	Gasperini 59' (pen.); Edmar 65' (pen.)	Stadium: San Paolo; Attendance: 63 330

30 October 1988 4	Cesena	0–1	Napoli	Cesena
		Report	Carnevale 14'	Attendance: 20 230

6 November 1988 5	Napoli	1–1	Lazio	Naples
	Carnevale 28'	Report	Rizzolo 66'	Stadium: San Paolo; Attendance: 67 780

20 November 1988 6	Juventus	3–5	Napoli	Turin
	Galia 48'; Zavarov 55'; De Agostini 77' (pen.)	Report	Carnevale 3'; Careca 30, 44, 58'; Renica 85' (pen.)	Stadium: Olimpico; Attendance: 50 400

27 November 1988 7	Napoli	4–1	Milan	Naples
	Maradona 42'; Careca 45, 78'; Francini 48'	Report	Virdis 65' (pen.)	Stadium: San Paolo; Attendance: 72 300

4 December 1988 8	Napoli	2–0	Fiorentina	Naples
	Maradona 30' (pen.); Careca 76'	Report		Stadium: San Paolo; Attendance: 70 340

11 December 1988 9	Verona	0–1	Napoli	Verona
		Report	Crippa 53'	Stadium: Marcantonio Bentegodi; Attendance: 27 780

18 December 1988 10	Napoli	3–1	Bologna	Naples
	Careca 26'; Maradona 53, 75'	Report	Demol 79' (pen.)	Stadium: San Paolo; Attendance: 60 437

31 December 1988 11	Roma	1–0	Napoli	Olimpico
	Völler 87'	Report		Stadium: Rome; Attendance: 68 800

8 January 1989 12	Torino	0–1	Napoli	Turin
		Report	Careca 30'	Stadium: Comunale; Attendance: 59 000

15 January 1989 13	Napoli	0–0	Inter	Naples
		Report		Stadium: San Paolo; Attendance: 73 388

22 January 1989 14	Sampdoria	0–0	Napoli	Genoa
		Report		Stadium: Luigi Ferraris; Attendance: 33 200

29 January 1989 15	Napoli	4–1	Ascoli	Naples
	Careca 1'; Maradona 33, 77'; Crippa 81'	Report	Cvetković 9'	Stadium: San Paolo; Attendance: 49 900

5 February 1989 16	Pisa	0–1	Napoli	Pisa
		Report	Carnevale 32'	Stadium: Arena Garibaldi; Attendance: 22 240

12 February 1989 17	Napoli	3–2	Como	Naples
	Crippa 11'; Neri 63'; Carnevale 82'	Report	Corneliusson 33'; Simone 43'	Stadium: San Paolo; Attendance: 51 110

19 February 1989 18	Atalanta	1–1	Napoli	Bergamo
	Nicolini 60'	Report	Maradona 40'	Stadium: Comunale; Attendance: 19 090

26 February 1989 19	Napoli	4–0	Lecce	Naples
	Carnevale 3, 47'; De Napoli 21'; Alemão 68'	Report		Stadium: San Paolo; Attendance: 50 300

5 March 1989 20	Pescara	0–0	Napoli	Pescara
		Report		Stadium: Adriatico; Attendance: 18 502

12 March 1989 21	Napoli	1–0	Cesena	Naples
	Chiti 80' (o.g.)	Report		Stadium: San Paolo; Attendance: 66 599

19 March 1989 22	Lazio	1–1	Napoli	Rome
	Sosa 31'	Report	Neri 19'	Stadium: Olimpico; Attendance: 60 319

2 April 1989 23	Napoli	2–4	Juventus	Naples
	De Napoli 5'; Careca 49'	Report	Napoli 8'; Buso 31, 61'; Magrin 90' (pen.)	Stadium: San Paolo; Attendance: 77 430

9 April 1989 24	Milan	0–0	Napoli	Milan
		Report		Stadium: San Siro; Attendance: 79 907

16 April 1989 25	Fiorentina	1–3	Napoli	Florence
	D. Pellegrini 45'	Report	Careca 25'; Carnevale 53, 70'	Stadium: Comunale; Attendance: 24 490

30 April 1989 26	Napoli	1–0	Verona	Naples
	Alemão 19'	Report		Stadium: San Paolo; Attendance: 64 480

7 May 1989 27	Bologna	1–1	Napoli	Bologna
	Lorenzo 22'	Report	Careca 25'	Stadium: Renato Dall'Ara; Attendance: 20 489

14 May 1989 28	Napoli	1–1	Roma	Naples
	Careca 58'	Report	Völler 74'	Stadium: San Paolo; Attendance: 71 300

21 May 1989 29	Napoli	4–1	Torino	Naples
	Carnevale 3'; Romano 22'; Careca 40' 48' (pen.)	Report	Cravero 52' (pen.)	Stadium: San Paolo; Attendance: 67 708

28 May 1989 30	Inter	2–1	Napoli	Milan
	Fusi 49' (o.g.); Matthäus 83'	Report	Careca 36'	Stadium: Giuseppe Meazza; Attendance: 75 560

4 June 1989 31	Napoli	1–1	Sampdoria	Naples
	Carannante 40'	Report	Cerezo 75'	Stadium: San Paolo; Attendance: 70 409

11 June 1989 32	Ascoli	2–0	Napoli	Ascoli Piceno
	Cvetković 17'; Giordano 24' (pen.)	Report		Stadium: Cino e Lillo Del Duca; Attendance: 18 560

18 June 1989 33	Napoli	0–0	Pisa	Naples
		Report		Stadium: San Paolo; Attendance: 59 094

25 June 1989 34	Como	0–1	Napoli	Como
		Report	Renica 36' (pen.)	Stadium: Giuseppe Sinigaglia; Attendance: 11 340

=== Coppa Italia ===
First Round- Group phase

21 August 1988 1	Spezia	1–3	Napoli
	Ceccaroni pen'		Francini; Carnevale; Carnevale	Attendance: 7 800

24 August 1988 2	S.S.C. Bari	2–0	Napoli	Bari
	Armenise; Maiellaro			Attendance: 19 450

28 August 1988 3	Sambenedettese	0–2	Napoli
			Salvioni o.g.' Romano	Attendance: 13 455

31 August 1988 4	Napoli	3–0	Barletta	Naples
	Renica; Alemao; Maradona			Stadium: San Paolo; Attendance: 34 560

3 September 1988 5	Napoli	1–0	Bologna
	Maradona			Attendance: 44 459

Second round

14 September 1988 1	Lecce	0–1	Napoli	Lecce
			Maradona	Stadium: Via del Mare; Attendance: 14 400

21 September 1988 2	Napoli	2–0	Cesena	Naples
	Carannante; Maradona			Stadium: San Paolo; Attendance: 49 890

28 September 1988 3	Modena	0–4	Napoli	Modena
			Maradona pen' Careca; Maradona; Carannante	Attendance: 18 903

Quarter-finals

4 January 1989	Napoli	3–0	Ascoli	Naples
	Corradini; Neri; Careca			Stadium: San Paolo; Attendance: 45 560

25 January 1989	Ascoli	3–1	Napoli	Ascoli Piceno
			Carnevale	Stadium: Cino e Lillo Del Duca; Attendance: 15 500

Semi-finals

1 February 1989	Pisa	0–2	Napoli	Pisa
			Carnevale; Maradona	Stadium: Arena Garibaldi; Attendance: 19 934

8 February 1989 3	Napoli	1–0	Pisa	Naples
	Romano			Stadium: San Paolo; Attendance: 60 200

==== Final ====
7 June 1989	Napoli	1–0	Sampdoria	Naples
21:00	Renica 55'			Stadium: San Paolo; Referee: Tullio Lanese

28 June 1989	Sampdoria	4–0 (4–1 agg.)	Napoli	Cremona
21:00	Vialli 32'; Cerezo 38'; Vierchowod 47'; Mancini 59' (pen.)			Stadium: Stadio Giovanni Zini; Referee: Rosario Lo Bello

=== UEFA Cup ===
==== First round ====
7 September 1988 1	Napoli (Italy)	1–0	(Greece) PAOK	Napoli
20:30 CET	Maradona 55' (pen.)	Report		Stadium: Stadio San Paolo; Referee: (Germany) Aron Schmidhuber

6 October 1988 2	PAOK (Greece)	1–1 (1–2 agg.)	(Italy) Napoli	Thessaloniki, Greece
20:30 CET	Skartados 61'	Report	Careca 17'	Stadium: Toumba Stadium; Referee: (Austria) Horst Brummeier

==== Second round ====
26 October 1988 1	Lokomotiv Leipzig (East Germany)	1–1	(Italy) Napoli	Leipzig, East Germany
20:30 CET	Zimmerling 67'		Francini 72'	Stadium: Zentralstadion; Referee: (Belgium) Alexis Ponnet

9 November 1988 2	Napoli (Italy)	2–0 (3–1 agg.)	(East Germany) Lokomotiv Leipzig	Napoli
20:30 CET	Francini 2'; Scholz 54' (o.g.)			Stadium: Stadio San Paolo; Referee: (Switzerland) Georges Sandoz

==== Eightfinals ====
23 November 1988 1	Girondins de Bordeaux (France)	0–1	(Italy) Napoli	Bordeaux, France
20:30 CET			Carnevale 5'	Stadium: Stade Chaban-Delmas; Referee: (Germany) Karl-Heinz Tritschler

7 December 1988 2	Napoli (Italy)	0–0 (1–0 agg.)	(France) Girondins de Bordeaux	Napoli
20:30 CET				Stadium: San Paolo; Referee: (England) Neil Midgley

==== Quarterfinals ====
1 March 1989 1	Juventus (Italy)	2–0	(Italy) Napoli	Turin, Italy
20:30 CET	Bruno 5'; Corradini 45' (o.g.)			Stadium: Stadio Olimpico; Referee: (England) George Courtney

15 March 1989 2	Napoli (Italy)	3–0 (a.e.t.) (3–2 agg.)	(Italy) Juventus	Naples
20:30 CET	Maradona 10' (pen.); Carnevale 45'; Renica 119'			Stadium: San Paolo; Referee: (East Germany) Siegfried Kirschen

==== Semifinals ====
5 April 1989 1	Napoli (Italy)	2–0	(West Germany) Bayern München	Napoli
20:30 CET	Careca 40'; Carnevale 59'			Stadium: Stadio San Paolo; Referee: (France) Michel Vautrot

19 April 1989 2	Bayern München (West Germany)	2–2 (2–4 agg.)	(Italy) Napoli	Munich, West Germany
20:30 CET	Wohlfarth 63'; Reuter 81'		Careca 61', 76'	Stadium: Olympiastadion; Referee: (Scotland) David F.T. Syme

==== Final ====
3 May 1989 1	Napoli (Italy)	2–1	(West Germany) VfB Stuttgart	Napoli
21:00 CET	Maradona 68' (pen.); Careca 87'	Report	17' Gaudino	Stadium: San Paolo; Attendance: 76,824; Referee: (Greece) Gerassimos Germanakos

17 May 1989 2	VfB Stuttgart (West Germany)	3–3 (4–5 agg.)	(Italy) Napoli	Stuttgart, West Germany
21:00 CET	Klinsmann 27'; De Napoli 70' (o.g.); Schmäler 89'	Report	18' Alemão; 39' Ferrara; 62' Careca	Stadium: Neckarstadion; Attendance: 67,000; Referee: (Spain) Victoriano Sánchez Arminio

== Statistics ==
=== Players statistics ===
No.	Pos	Nat	Player	Total		Serie A		Coppa		UEFA Cup	
No.	Pos	Nat	Player	Apps	Goals	Apps	Goals	Apps	Goals	Apps	Goals
	GK	(Italy) ITA	Giuliani	54	-47	32	-27	10	-10	12	-10
	DF	(Italy) ITA	Ferrara	47	1	27	0	8	0	12	1
	DF	(Italy) ITA	Corradini	58	1	30+2	0	14	1	12	0
	DF	(Italy) ITA	Renica	52	5	28	2	12	2	12	1
	DF	(Italy) ITA	Francini	49	4	26	1	12	1	11	2
	MF	(Italy) ITA	Crippa	51	2	29+2	2	10	0	9+1	0
	MF	(Italy) ITA	Fusi	56	0	31	0	14	0	11	0
	MF	(Italy) ITA	De Napoli	50	2	30	2	11	0	9	0
	FW	(Italy) ITA	Carnevale	46	20	27+1	13	10	4	8	3
	FW	(Brazil) BRA	Careca	52	27	29+1	19	10	2	12	6
	FW	(Argentina) ARG	Maradona	50	19	24+2	9	12	7	12	3
	GK	(Italy) ITA	Di Fusco	7	-2	2+1	-1	4	-1	0	0
	DF	(Italy) ITA	Carannante	53	3	18+11	1	14	2	3+7	0
	MF	(Brazil) BRA	Alemão	34	5	15+1	3	10	1	8	1
	MF	(Italy) ITA	Romano	25	3	9+6	1	7	2	1+2	0
	MF	(Italy) ITA	Neri	18	3	5+6	2	6	1	0+1	0
	DF	(Italy) ITA	Bigliardi	18	0	5+4	0	6	0	0+3	0
	DF	(Italy) ITA	Filardi	20	0	4+8	0	8	0		
	FW	(Italy) ITA	Giacchetta	10	1	1+2	1	5	0	0+2	0
	MF	(Italy) ITA	Bucciarelli	2	0	1+1	0				
	FW	(Italy) ITA	Ferrante	1	0	1	0				
	DF	(Italy) ITA	Di Rocco	6	0	0+2	0	4	0		
	DF	(Italy) ITA	Portalauri	2	0	0+2	0				
	FW	(Italy) ITA	Chiaiese	0	0	0	0				
	FW	(Italy) ITA	Buonocore	0	0	0	0				

- Source: https://www.bdfutbol.com/en/t/t1988-893003.html

== Sources ==
- RSSSF - Italy 1988/89
