= 1989–90 SSC Napoli season =

Napoli
1989–90 season
- Owner: Corrado Ferlaino
- President: Corrado Ferlaino
- Head coach: Alberto Bigon
- Stadium: San Paolo
- Serie A: 1st (In 1990–91 European Cup)
- Coppa Italia: Semi-finals
- UEFA Cup: Third round
- Top goalscorer: League: Maradona (16); All: Maradona (18)
Home colours	Away colours	Third colours

S.S.C. Napoli won their second ever Italian championship, thanks to a new club record in points scored over the course of the season. Diego Maradona scored 16 of the side's 57, whilst the contributions of other players such as Careca and Gianfranco Zola gave Napoli enough of an attacking edge to claim the title.

== Squad ==
Note: Flags indicate national team as defined under FIFA eligibility rules; some limited exceptions apply. Players may hold more than one non-FIFA nationality.

Pos.	Nation	Player
GK	ITA	Raffaele Di Fusco
GK	ITA	Giuliano Giuliani
DF	ITA	Marco Baroni
DF	ITA	Tebaldo Bigliardi
DF	ITA	Giancarlo Corradini
DF	ITA	Ciro Ferrara
DF	ITA	Giovanni Francini
DF	ITA	Alessandro Renica
MF	BRA	Alemão
MF	ITA	Antonio Bucciarelli

Pos.	Nation	Player
MF	ITA	Massimo Crippa
MF	ITA	Fernando De Napoli
MF	ITA	Luca Fusi
MF	ITA	Massimo Mauro
FW	BRA	Careca
FW	ITA	Andrea Carnevale
FW	ARG	Diego Maradona
FW	ITA	Maurizio Neri
FW	ITA	Gianfranco Zola

=== Transfers ===
In
Pos.	Name	from	Type
FW	Gianfranco Zola	ASD Torres	
MF	Massimo Mauro	Juventus	
DF	Marco Baroni	U.S. Lecce	
DF	Massimo Tarantino	Catania	

Out
Pos.	Name	To	Type
DF	Massimo Filardi	Avellino	
MF	Francesco Romano	Torino	
MF	Giovanni Di Rocco	Torres	loan

==== Winter ====
In
Pos.	Name	from	Type

Out
Pos.	Name	To	Type
DF	Massimo Tarantino	A.C. Monza	loan
FW	Maurizio Neri	Pisa	

== Competitions ==
=== Serie A ===
==== League table ====
Pos	Team	Pld	W	D	L	GF	GA	GD	Pts	Qualification or relegation
1	Napoli (C)	34	21	9	4	57	31	+26	51	Qualification to European Cup
2	Milan (Note: Milan qualified for the 1990–91 European Cup as defending champions.)	34	22	5	7	56	27	+29	49	Qualification to European Cup
3	Internazionale	34	17	10	7	55	32	+23	44	Qualification to UEFA Cup
4	Juventus	34	15	14	5	56	36	+20	44	Qualification to Cup Winners' Cup
5	Sampdoria (Note: Sampdoria qualified for the 1990–91 European Cup Winners' Cup as defending champions.)	34	16	11	7	46	26	+20	43	Qualification to Cup Winners' Cup

Source: 1989–90 Serie A, RSSSF.com
Rules for classification: 1) Points; 2) Head-to-head points; 3) Head-to-head goal difference; 4) Goal difference; 5) Goals scored; 6) Draw.
(C) Champions

==== Result by round ====
Round	1	2	3	4	5	6	7	8	9	10	11	12	13	14	15	16	17	18	19	20	21	22	23	24	25	26	27	28	29	30	31	32	33	34
Ground	A	H	A	H	A	A	H	A	H	A	H	H	A	H	A	H	A	H	A	H	A	H	H	A	H	A	H	A	A	H	A	H	A	H
Result	W	W	D	W	W	D	W	D	W	D	W	D	D	W	D	W	L	W	D	W	W	W	W	L	W	L	W	W	L	W	W	W	W	W
Position	6	1	3	2	1	2	1	1	1	1	1	1	1	1	1	1	1	1	1	1	1	1	1	2	2	2	2	2	2	2	2	2	1	1

Source: Competitive matches
A = Away; H = Home; W = Win; D = Draw; L = Loss; P = Postponed; = Leader, 1990–91 European Cup; = 1990–91 UEFA Cup

==== Matches ====
27 August 1989 1	Ascoli	0–1	Napoli	Ascoli Piceno
		Report	Crippa 24'	Stadium: Cino e Lillo Del Duca

3 September 1989 2	Napoli	1–0	Udinese	Naples
	Renica 48'	Report		Stadium: San Paolo

6 September 1989 3	Cesena	0–0	Napoli	Cesena
		Report		Stadium: Dino Manuzzi

10 September 1989 4	Verona	1–2	Napoli	Naples
	Gutiérrez 62'	Report	Mauro 38'; Careca 52' (pen.)	Stadium: San Paolo

17 September 1989 5	Napoli	3–2	Fiorentina	Naples
	Pioli 61' (o.g.); Careca 76'; Corradini 87'	Report	Baggio 22', 31' (pen.)	Stadium: San Paolo

24 September 1989 6	Cremonese	1–1	Napoli	Cremona
	Dezotti 45'	Report	Maradona 78'	Stadium: Giovanni Zini

1 October 1989 7	Napoli	3–0	Milan	Naples
	Carnevale 19, 45'; Maradona 84'	Report		Stadium: San Paolo

8 October 1989 8	Roma	1–1	Napoli	Rome
	Comi 10'	Report	Maradona 55' (pen.)	Stadium: Flaminio

22 October 1989 9	Napoli	2–0	Inter	Naples
	Careca 75'; Maradona 84'	Report		Stadium: San Paolo

29 October 1989 10	Genoa	1–1	Napoli	Genoa
	Fontolan 34'	Report	Maradona 60' (pen.)	Stadium: Luigi Ferrari

5 November 1989 11	Napoli	3–2	Lecce	Naples
	Fusi 22'; Carnevale 33, 89'	Report	Virdis 5'; Conte 46'	Stadium: San Paolo

19 November 1989 12	Napoli	1–1	Sampdoria	Naples
	Maradona 24' (pen.)	Report	Dossena 60'	Stadium: San Paolo

26 November 1989 13	Juventus	1–1	Napoli	Turin
	Bonetti 73'	Report	Crippa 16'	Stadium: Comunale

3 December 1989 14	Napoli	3–1	Atalanta	Naples
	Crippa 9'; Careca 28' (pen.); Zola 48'	Report	Pasciullo 50'	Stadium: San Paolo

10 December 1989 15	Bari	1–1	Napoli	Bari
	Monelli 6'	Report	Carnevale 82'	Stadium: della Vittoria

7 February 1990 16	Napoli	2–0	Bologna	Naples
	Careca 3'; Baroni 76'	Report		Stadium: San Paolo

30 December 1989 17	Lazio	3–0	Napoli	Rome
	Amarildo 36, 81'; Pin 77'	Report		Stadium: Flaminio

7 January 1990 18	Napoli	1–0	Ascoli	Naples
	Carnevale 66'	Report		Stadium: San Paolo

14 January 1990 19	Udinese	2–2	Napoli	Udine
	De Vitis 3'; Mattei 86'	Report	Maradona 88' (pen.); Corradini 90'	Stadium: Friuli

17 January 1990 20	Napoli	1–0	Cesena	Naples
	Crippa 26'	Report		Stadium: San Paolo

21 January 1990 21	Napoli	2–0	Verona	Naples
	Giacomarro 16' (o.g.); Maradona 43'	Report		Stadium: San Paolo

28 January 1990 22	Fiorentina	0–1	Napoli	Florence
		Report	Fusi 19'	Stadium: Comunale

4 February 1990 23	Napoli	3–0	Cremonese	Naples
	Alemão 24'; Maradona 33, 67'	Report		Stadium: San Paolo

11 February 1990 24	Milan	3–0	Napoli	Milan
	Massaro 47'; Maldini 71' van Basten 86'	Report		Stadium: San Siro

18 February 1990 25	Napoli	3–1	Roma	Naples
	Maradona 53' (pen.), 72' (pen.); Careca 62'	Report	Nela 4'	Stadium: San Paolo

25 February 1990 26	Inter	3–1	Napoli	Milan
	Ferrara 49' (o.g.); Klinsmann 53'; Bianchi 58'	Report	Careca 7'	Stadium: Giuseppe Meazza

4 March 1990 27	Napoli	2–1	Genoa	Naples
	Francini 46'; Zola 90'	Report	Paz 80'	Stadium: San Paolo

11 March 1990 28	Lecce	1–1	Napoli	Lecce
	Pasculli 68'	Report	Carnevale 54'	Stadium: Via del Mare

18 March 1990 29	Sampdoria	2–1	Napoli	Genoa
	Dossena 37'; Lombardo 67'	Report	Careca 50'	Stadium: Luigi Ferraris

25 March 1990 30	Napoli	3–1	Juventus	Naples
	Maradona 13, 28'; Francini 64'	Report	De Agostini 61' (pen.)	Stadium: San Paolo

8 April 1990 31	Atalanta	0–2	Napoli	Bergamo
		Report	'79 Alemão	Stadium: Comunale; Referee: Luigi Agnolin
Note: Match score was a 0-0 draw after 90 minutes. However, Italian Federation awarded the match 0-2 to SSC Napoli due to objects thrown to the field by Atalanta BC fanbase and hit Brazilian Midfielder Alemão at minute 79.

13 April 1990 32	Napoli	3–0	Bari	Naples
	Maradona 27' (pen.); Carnevale 53'; Careca 70'	Report		Stadium: San Paolo

22 April 1990 33	Bologna	2–4	Napoli	Bologna
	De Marchi 47'; Iliev 90'	Report	Careca 3'; Maradona 9'; Francini 15'; Alemão 85'	Stadium: Renato Dall'Ara

29 April 1990 34	Napoli	1–0	Lazio	Naples
	Baroni 7'	Report		Stadium: San Paolo

=== Coppa Italia ===
First round

23 August 1989	Napoli	1–1 (10-9 p)	Monza	Castellammare di Stabia
	Carnevale I 84'		64' Cappellini	Stadium: Romeo Menti; Referee: Felicani

Second round

30 August 1989	Napoli	2–0	Reggina	Avellino
	Zola 20'; Renica 22' (pen.)			Stadium: Partenio; Referee: Cornieti

Group phase-Group B

10 January 1990 2	Napoli	2–0	Bologna	Naples
	Francini 11'; Alemão 38'			Stadium: San Paolo; Referee: Baldas

24 January 1990 3	Fiorentina	1–1	Napoli	Perugia
	Dunga 22'		48' Maradona	Stadium: Renato Curi; Referee: Coppetelli

Semifinals

31 January 1990	Milan	0–0	Napoli	Milan
				Stadium: Stadio Giuseppe Meazza; Referee: Baldas

14 February 1990	Napoli	1–3	Milan	Naples
	Maradona 78' (pen.)		43', 88' Massaro; 76' (pen.) van Basten	Stadium: San Paolo; Referee: Lanese

=== Coppa UEFA ===
Round of 32

14 September 1989	(Portugal) Sporting CP	0–0	Napoli	Lisbon
				Stadium: José Alvalade; Referee: (England) Courtney

27 September 1989	Napoli	0–0 (4–3 p)	(Portugal) Sporting CP	Naples
				Stadium: San Paolo; Referee: (France) Biguet

Round of 16

18 October 1989	(Switzerland) Wettingen	0–0	Napoli	Zürich
				Stadium: Letzigrund Stadion; Referee: (Romania) Crăciunescu

1 November 1989	Napoli	2–1	(Switzerland) Wettingen	Naples
	Baroni 68'; Mauro II 75' (pen.)		15' Bertelsen	Stadium: San Paolo; Referee: (Malta) Azzopardi

Eightfinals

22 November 1989	Napoli	2–3	(West Germany) Werder Bremen	Naples
	Alemão 52'; Careca 65'		41' Neubarth; 46' Riedle; 90' Rufer	Stadium: San Paolo; Referee: (Sweden) Karlsson

6 December 1989	(West Germany) Werder Bremen	5–1	Napoli	Bremen
	Riedle 27', 62'; Rufer 55'; Sauer 88'; Eilts 89'		70' Careca	Stadium: Weserstadion; Referee: (Spain) Soriano Aladrén

== Statistics ==
=== Players statistics ===
No.	Pos	Nat	Player	Total		Serie A		Coppa		UEFA	
No.	Pos	Nat	Player	Apps	Goals	Apps	Goals	Apps	Goals	Apps	Goals
	GK	(Italy) ITA	Giuliani	44	-42	32	-28	6	-5	6	-9
	DF	(Italy) ITA	Ferrara	45	0	33	0	6	0	6	0
	DF	(Italy) ITA	Corradini	38	2	22+6	2	6	0	4	0
	DF	(Italy) ITA	Baroni	44	3	31+2	2	5	0	6	1
	DF	(Italy) ITA	Francini	36	4	25+1	3	6	1	4	0
	MF	(Italy) ITA	Crippa	42	4	32	4	5	0	5	0
	MF	(Brazil) BRA	Alemão	35	4	26+1	2	3	1	5	1
	MF	(Italy) ITA	Fusi	40	2	27+2	2	5	0	6	0
	MF	(Italy) ITA	De Napoli	41	0	32	0	3	0	6	0
	FW	(Italy) ITA	Carnevale	42	9	30+1	8	5	1	6	0
	FW	(Argentina) ARG	Maradona	36	18	26+2	16	3	2	5	0
	GK	(Italy) ITA	Di Fusco	2	-3	2	-3	0	0	0	0
	FW	(Brazil) BRA	Careca	29	11	21+1	10	1	0	6	1
	MF	(Italy) ITA	Mauro	40	2	20+10	1	5	0	5	1
	DF	(France) FRA	Renica	13	2	8	1	2	1	3	0
	FW	(Italy) ITA	Zola	26	3	5+13	2	6	1	2	0
	DF	(Italy) ITA	Bigliardi	11	0	2+5	0	3	0	1	0
	FW	(Italy) ITA	Neri	5	0	0+3	0	2	0		
	DF	(Italy) ITA	Tarantino	2	0	0+1	0	1	0		
	MF	(Italy) ITA	Bucciarelli	4	0	0+2	0	2	0		

- Source: http://calcio-seriea.net/presenze/1989/981/

== Sources ==
- RSSSF - Italy 1989/90
