= 1989 Coppa Italia final =

41st Coppa Italia final
- Event: 1988–89 Coppa Italia
Napoli	Sampdoria
1	4

First leg
Napoli	Sampdoria
1	0
- Date: 19 June 1989
- Venue: Stadio San Paolo, Naples
- Referee: Tullio Lanese
- Attendance: 70,300

Second leg
Sampdoria	Napoli
4	0
- Date: 28 June 1989
- Venue: Stadio Giovanni Zini, Cremona
- Referee: Rosario Lo Bello
- Attendance: 34,400

The 1989 Coppa Italia final was the final of the 1988–89 Coppa Italia. The match was played over two legs on 19 and 28 June 1989 between Sampdoria and Napoli. Sampdoria won 4–1 on aggregate. It was Sampdoria's third victory.

== First leg ==
7 June 1989
21:00

Napoli	1–0	Sampdoria
Renica 55'

Stadio San Paolo, Naples
Attendance: 70,300
Referee: Tullio Lanese

Napoli	Sampdoria

GK	1	(Italy) Claudio Garella
RB	2	(Italy) Giancarlo Corradini
CB	5	(Brazil) Alemão
CB	6	(Italy) Alessandro Renica
LB	3	(Italy) Giovanni Francini
DM	4	(Italy) Luca Fusi	(substituted off) 50'
CM	8	(Italy) Massimo Crippa
CM	7	(Italy) Antonio Carannante
AM	10	(Argentina) Diego Maradona (c)
CF	9	(Brazil) Careca
CF	11	(Italy) Andrea Carnevale
Substitutes:
MF		(Italy) Maurizio Neri	(substituted on) 50'
Manager:
(Italy) Ottavio Bianchi

GK	1	(Italy) Gianluca Pagliuca
RB	2	(Italy) Marco Lanna
CB	5	(Italy) Pietro Vierchowod
CB	6	(Italy) Luca Pellegrini (c)
LB	3	(Italy) Amedeo Carboni
RM	7	(Spain) Víctor Muñoz	(substituted off) 77'
CM	4	(Italy) Fausto Pari
CM	8	(Brazil) Toninho Cerezo
LM	11	(Italy) Giuseppe Dossena	(substituted off) 71'
CF	10	(Italy) Roberto Mancini
CF	9	(Italy) Gianluca Vialli
Substitutes:
MF		(Italy) Fulvio Bonomi	(substituted on) 71'
MF		(Italy) Fausto Salsano	(substituted on) 77'
Manager:
(Socialist Federal Republic of Yugoslavia) Vujadin Boškov

== Second leg ==
28 June 1989
21:00

Sampdoria	4–0	Napoli
Vialli 32'; Cerezo 38'; Vierchowod 47'; Mancini 59' (pen.)

Stadio Giovanni Zini, Cremona
Attendance: 34,400
Referee: Rosario Lo Bello

Sampdoria	Napoli

GK	1	(Italy) Gianluca Pagliuca
RB	2	(Italy) Marco Lanna
CB	5	(Italy) Pietro Vierchowod
CB	6	(Italy) Luca Pellegrini (c)
LB	3	(Italy) Amedeo Carboni
RM	7	(Spain) Víctor Muñoz	(substituted off) 87'
CM	4	(Italy) Fausto Pari
CM	8	(Brazil) Toninho Cerezo
LM	11	(Italy) Giuseppe Dossena
CF	10	(Italy) Roberto Mancini
CF	9	(Italy) Gianluca Vialli	(substituted off) 83'
Substitutes:
MF		(Italy) Fausto Salsano	(substituted on) 83'
MF		(Italy) Fulvio Bonomi	(substituted on) 87'
Manager:
(Socialist Federal Republic of Yugoslavia) Vujadin Boškov

GK	1	(Italy) Claudio Garella
RB	2	(Italy) Giancarlo Corradini
CB	5	(Brazil) Alemão
CB	6	(Italy) Alessandro Renica
LB	3	(Italy) Giovanni Francini
RM	7	(Italy) Massimo Crippa
CM	4	(Italy) Luca Fusi	(substituted off) 80'
CM	8	(Italy) Fernando De Napoli
LM	11	(Italy) Antonio Carannante	(substituted off) 51'
AM	10	(Argentina) Diego Maradona (c)
CF	9	(Brazil) Careca
Substitutes:
MF		(Italy) Maurizio Neri	(substituted on) 51'
DF		(Italy) Tebaldo Bigliardi	(substituted on) 80'
Manager:
(Italy) Ottavio Bianchi

== See also ==
- 1988–89 SSC Napoli season
- 1988–89 UC Sampdoria season
