= 1989 UEFA Cup final =

- Event: 1988–89 UEFA Cup
Napoli	VfB Stuttgart
(Italy)	(West Germany)
5	4
- on aggregate

First leg
Napoli	VfB Stuttgart
2	1
- Date: 3 May 1989
- Venue: Stadio San Paolo, Naples
- Referee: Gerasimos Germanakos (Greece)
- Attendance: 81,093

Second leg
VfB Stuttgart	Napoli
3	3
- Date: 17 May 1989
- Venue: Neckarstadion, Stuttgart
- Referee: Victoriano Sánchez Arminio (Spain)
- Attendance: 67,000

The 1989 UEFA Cup Final was an association football tie played on 3 May 1989 and 17 May 1989 between Napoli of Italy and Stuttgart of West Germany. Captained by Diego Maradona, Napoli won the two-legged final 5–4 on aggregate to win their first major European honour.

== Route to the final ==
Napoli				Round	VfB Stuttgart			
Opponent	Agg.	1st leg	2nd leg		Opponent	Agg.	1st leg	2nd leg
(Greece) PAOK	2–1	1–0 (H)	1–1 (A)	First round	(Hungary) Tatabányai Bányász	3–2	2–0 (H)	1–2 (A)
(East Germany) Lokomotive Leipzig	3–1	1–1 (A)	2–0 (H)	Second round	(Socialist Federal Republic of Yugoslavia) Dinamo Zagreb	4–2	3–1 (A)	1–1 (H)
(France) Girondins de Bordeaux	1–0	1–0 (A)	0–0 (H)	Third round	(Netherlands) Groningen	5–1	3–1 (A)	2–0 (H)
(Italy) Juventus	3–2 (a.e.t.)	0–2 (A)	3–0 (a.e.t.) (H)	Quarter-finals	(Spain) Real Sociedad	1–1 (p)	1–0 (H)	0–1 (a.e.t.) (A)
(West Germany) Bayern Munich	4–2	2–0 (H)	2–2 (A)	Semi-finals	(East Germany) Dynamo Dresden	2–1	1–0 (H)	1–1 (A)

== Match details ==
=== First leg ===
3 May 1989
20:30

Napoli (Italy)	2–1	(West Germany) VfB Stuttgart
Maradona 68' (pen.); Careca 87'	Report; Overview (archive)	Gaudino 17'

Stadio San Paolo, Naples, Italy
Attendance: 81,093
Referee: Gerasimos Germanakos (Greece)

Napoli	Stuttgart

GK	1	(Italy) Giuliano Giuliani
DF	2	(Italy) Ciro Ferrara
DF	6	(Italy) Alessandro Renica
DF	4	(Italy) Giancarlo Corradini		(substituted on) 100'
DF	3	(Italy) Giovanni Francini
MF	5	(Brazil) Alemão
MF	8	(Italy) Fernando De Napoli
MF	7	(Italy) Luca Fusi
FW	10	(Argentina) Diego Maradona (c)
FW	11	(Italy) Andrea Carnevale
FW	9	(Brazil) Careca
Substitutes:
GK	12	(Italy) Raffaele Di Fusco
DF	13	(Italy) Antonio Carannante
MF	14	(Italy) Massimo Crippa	(yellow card) 69'	(substituted on) 46'
MF	15	(Italy) Francesco Romano
FW	16	(Italy) Maurizio Neri
Manager:
(Italy) Ottavio Bianchi Man of the Match: Assistant referees:

GK	1	(West Germany) Eike Immel	(yellow card) 67'
DF	2	(West Germany) Günther Schäfer
DF	7	(West Germany) Karl Allgöwer
DF	4	(West Germany) Guido Buchwald (c)	(yellow card) 25'
DF	3	(West Germany) Michael Schröder	(yellow card) 55'
MF	6	(Socialist Federal Republic of Yugoslavia) Srečko Katanec
MF	5	(West Germany) Jürgen Hartmann
MF	8	(West Germany) Nils Schmäler
MF	10	(Iceland) Ásgeir Sigurvinsson
MF	11	(West Germany) Maurizio Gaudino
FW	9	(West Germany) Fritz Walter		(substituted off) 70'
Substitutes:
DF	12	(West Germany) Rainer Zietsch		(substituted on) 70'
MF	13	(West Germany) Rainer Schütterle
MF	14	(West Germany) Gerhard Poschner
FW	15	(West Germany) Olaf Schmäler
GK	16	(West Germany) Eberhard Trautner
Manager:
(Netherlands) Arie Haan

=== Second leg ===
17 May 1989
20:15

VfB Stuttgart (West Germany)	3–3	(Italy) Napoli
Klinsmann 27'; De Napoli 70' (o.g.); O. Schmäler 89'	Report; Overview (archive)	Alemão 18'; Ferrara 39'; Careca 62'

Neckarstadion, Stuttgart, West Germany
Attendance: 67,000
Referee: Victoriano Sánchez Arminio (Spain)

Stuttgart	Napoli

GK	1	(West Germany) Eike Immel
DF	2	(West Germany) Günther Schäfer
DF	7	(West Germany) Karl Allgöwer (c)
DF	4	(West Germany) Nils Schmäler
DF	3	(West Germany) Michael Schröder
MF	6	(Socialist Federal Republic of Yugoslavia) Srečko Katanec	(yellow card) 44'
MF	5	(West Germany) Jürgen Hartmann
MF	10	(Iceland) Ásgeir Sigurvinsson
MF	11	(West Germany) Maurizio Gaudino
FW	8	(West Germany) Fritz Walter		(substituted off) 77'
FW	9	(West Germany) Jürgen Klinsmann
Substitutes:
DF	12	(West Germany) Rainer Zietsch
MF	13	(West Germany) Rainer Schütterle
MF	14	(West Germany) Gerhard Poschner
FW	15	(West Germany) Olaf Schmäler		(substituted on) 77'
GK	16	(West Germany) Eberhard Trautner
Manager:
(Netherlands) Arie Haan Man of the Match: Assistant referees:

GK	1	(Italy) Giuliano Giuliani
DF	2	(Italy) Ciro Ferrara
DF	6	(Italy) Alessandro Renica
DF	4	(Italy) Giancarlo Corradini
DF	3	(Italy) Giovanni Francini
MF	5	(Brazil) Alemão	(substituted off) 30'
MF	8	(Italy) Fernando De Napoli
MF	7	(Italy) Luca Fusi
FW	10	(Argentina) Diego Maradona (c)
FW	11	(Italy) Andrea Carnevale
FW	9	(Brazil) Careca	(substituted off) 70'
Substitutes:
GK	12	(Italy) Raffaele Di Fusco
DF	13	(Italy) Tebaldo Bigliardi	(substituted on) 70'
DF	14	(Italy) Antonio Carannante	(substituted on) 30'
MF	15	(Italy) Francesco Romano
FW	16	(Italy) Maurizio Neri
Manager:
(Italy) Ottavio Bianchi

== See also ==
- 1989 European Cup final
- 1989 European Cup Winners' Cup final
- S.S.C. Napoli in European football
- 1988–89 S.S.C. Napoli season
