= 1988–89 UC Sampdoria season =

Sampdoria
1988–89 season
- Chairman: Paolo Mantovani
- Manager: Vujadin Boškov
- Serie A: 5th
- Coppa Italia: Winners
- Supercoppa Italiana: Runners-up
- Cup Winners' Cup: Runners-up
- Top goalscorer: League: Gianluca Vialli (14); All: Gianluca Vialli (33)
Home colours	Away colours

UC Sampdoria had its most successful season ever, winning the Coppa Italia and reaching the final of the Cup Winners' Cup, where it came up short to Barcelona with 2–0. It finished fifth in Serie A with 14 goals from Gianluca Vialli marking the international breakthrough for the striker.

== Squad ==
Note: Flags indicate national team as defined under FIFA eligibility rules; some limited exceptions apply. Players may hold more than one non-FIFA nationality.

Pos.	Nation	Player
GK	ITA	Gianluca Pagliuca
GK	ITA	Guido Bistazzoni
DF	ITA	Moreno Mannini
DF	ITA	Pietro Vierchowod
DF	ITA	Luca Pellegrini
DF	ITA	Marco Lanna
DF	ITA	Amedeo Carboni
DF	ITA	Stefano Pellegrini
DF	ITA	Emilio Affuso
MF	ITA	Fulvio Bonomi
MF	ITA	Fausto Pari

Pos.	Nation	Player
MF	ITA	Mirco Gubellini
MF	BRA	Toninho Cerezo
MF	ITA	Fausto Salsano
MF	ESP	Víctor Muñoz
MF	ITA	Giuseppe Dossena
MF	ITA	Roberto Breda
FW	ITA	Enrico Chiesa
FW	ITA	Roberto Mancini
FW	ITA	Gianluca Vialli
FW	ITA	Loris Pradella

=== Transfers ===
In
Pos.	Name	from	Type
MF	Víctor Muñoz	FC Barcelona	
DF	Amedeo Carboni	Parma	
DF	Stefano Pellegrini	Monza	
MF	Giuseppe Dossena	Udinese	

Out
Pos.	Name	to	Type
DF	Hans-Peter Briegel	1.FC Kaiserslautern	
DF	Antonio Paganin	Udinese	
MF	Luca Fusi	SSC Napoli	
FW	Maurizio Ganz	Monza	
FW	Marco Branca	Udinese	

== Competitions ==
=== Supercoppa Italiana ===
14 June 1989	Milan	3–1	Sampdoria	Milan
	Rijkaard 18'; Mannari 72'; Van Basten 90' (pen.)		Vialli 14'	Stadium: San Siro; Attendance: 19,412; Referee: Pietro D'Elia

=== Serie A ===
==== League table ====
Pos	Team	Pld	W	D	L	GF	GA	GD	Pts	Qualification or relegation
3	Milan (Note: Milan qualified for the 1989–90 European Cup as the 1988–89 European Cup defending champions.)	34	16	14	4	61	25	+36	46	Qualification to European Cup
4	Juventus	34	15	13	6	51	36	+15	43	Qualification to UEFA Cup
5	Sampdoria	34	14	11	9	43	25	+18	39	Qualification to Cup Winners' Cup
6	Atalanta	34	11	14	9	37	32	+5	36	Qualification to UEFA Cup
7	Fiorentina (Note: AC Fiorentina won the UEFA Cup qualification match against AS Roma then qualified to 1989–90 UEFA Cup.)	34	12	10	12	44	43	+1	34	Qualification to UEFA Cup

Source: 1988–89 Serie A, RSSSF.com
Rules for classification: 1) Points; 2) Head-to-head points; 3) Head-to-head goal difference; 4) Goal difference; 5) Goals scored; 6) Draw.

==== Results summary ====
Overall								Home						Away					
Pld	W	D	L	GF	GA	GD	Pts	W	D	L	GF	GA	GD	W	D	L	GF	GA	GD
34	14	11	9	43	25	+18	53	10	3	4	30	13	+17	4	8	5	13	12	+1

Source: Worldfootball

==== Results by round ====
Round	1	2	3	4	5	6	7	8	9	10	11	12	13	14	15	16	17	18	19	20	21	22	23	24	25	26	27	28	29	30	31	32	33	34
Ground	A	H	A	H	A	H	A	H	A	H	A	H	A	H	A	H	A	H	A	H	A	H	A	H	A	H	A	H	A	H	A	H	A	H
Result	W	W	D	W	L	W	W	L	D	W	D	D	W	D	D	W	D	W	W	W	D	L	D	L	L	L	L	D	L	W	D	W	L	W
Position	1	1	1	1	3	2	2	3	3	3	3	4	3	3	3	3	3	3	3	3	3	3	3	3	4	5	6	5	6	5	5	5	5	5

Source: Competitive matches
A = Away; H = Home; W = Win; D = Draw; L = Loss; = 1989–90 European Cup; = 1989–90 UEFA Cup; = 1989–90 Serie B

==== Matches ====
9 October 1988 1	Torino	2–3	Sampdoria	Turin
	Skoro 39'; Vierchowod 87' (o.g.)	Report	Bonomi 7'; Vierchowod 63'; Dossena 83'	Stadium: Stadio Comunale; Referee: Luigi Agnolin

16 October 1988 2	Sampdoria	2–0	Como	Genoa
	Cerezo 14'; Mancini 60'	Report		Stadium: Stadio Luigi Ferraris; Referee: Bruno Di Cola

23 October 1988 3	Pisa	1–1	Sampdoria	Pisa
	Brandani 11'	Report	Vialli 90' (pen.)	Stadium: Arena Garibaldi; Referee: Tullio Lanese

30 October 1988 4	Sampdoria	1–0	Ascoli	Genoa
	Vialli 63'	Report		Stadium: Stadio Luigi Ferraris; Referee: Romeo Paparesta

6 November 1988 5	Internazionale	1–0	Sampdoria	Milan
	Berti 1'	Report		Stadium: San Siro; Referee: Fabio Baldas

20 November 1988 6	Sampdoria	4–1	Bologna	Genoa
	Mancini 4'; Muñoz 43'; Dossena 55'; Vialli 61' (pen.)	Report	Poli 78'	Stadium: Stadio Luigi Ferraris; Referee: Carlo Sguizzato

27 November 1988 7	Fiorentina	0–2	Sampdoria	Florence
		Report	Dossena 58'; Vialli 90'	Stadium: Stadio Comunale; Referee: Pietro D'Elia

4 December 1988 8	Sampdoria	0–2	Roma	Genoa
		Report	Völler 35'; Massaro 77'	Stadium: Stadio Luigi Ferraris; Referee: Angelo Amendolia

11 December 1988 9	Juventus	0–0	Sampdoria	Turin
		Report		Stadium: Comunale; Referee: Luigi Agnolin

18 December 1988 10	Sampdoria	3–0	Lecce	Genoa
	Muñoz 54'; Vialli 59'; Pradella 86'	Report		Stadium: Stadio Luigi Ferraris; Referee: Marcello Nicchi

31 December 1988 11	Milan	0–0	Sampdoria	Milan
		Report		Stadium: San Siro; Referee: Rosario Lo Bello

8 January 1989 12	Sampdoria	1–1	Atalanta	Genoa
	Vialli 89'	Report	Evair 56'	Stadium: Stadio Luigi Ferraris; Referee: Angelo Amendolia

15 January 1989 13	Pescara	0–1	Sampdoria	Pescara
		Report	Vialli 38'	Stadium: Stadio Adriatico; Referee: Pierluigi Magni

22 January 1989 14	Sampdoria	0–0	Napoli	Genoa
		Report		Stadium: Stadio Luigi Ferraris; Referee: Pierluigi Pairetto

29 January 1989 15	Hellas Verona	1–1	Sampdoria	Verona
	Bortolazzi 29' (pen.)	Report	Vialli 23'	Stadium: Stadio Marcantonio Bentegodi; Referee: Pietro D'Elia

5 February 1989 16	Sampdoria	1–0	Lazio	Genoa
	Mancini 44'	Report		Stadium: Stadio Luigi Ferraris; Referee: Luciano Luci

12 February 1989 17	Cesena	0–0	Sampdoria	Cesena
		Report		Stadium: Stadio Dino Manuzzi; Referee: Pierluigi Magni

19 February 1989 18	Sampdoria	5–1	Torino	Genoa
	Dossena 27'; Carboni 30'; Vialli 45'; Mancini 60', 64'	Report	Zago 15'	Stadium: Stadio Luigi Ferraris; Referee: Moreno Frigerio

26 February 1989 19	Como	0–2	Sampdoria	Como
		Report	Bonomi 42'; Vialli 78' (pen.)	Stadium: Stadio Mario Sinigaglia; Referee: Carlo Longhi

5 March 1989 20	Sampdoria	2–0	Pisa	Genoa
	Vialli 60' (pen.), 79'	Report		Stadium: Stadio Luigi Ferraris; Referee: Arcangelo Pezzella

12 March 1989 21	Ascoli	2–2	Sampdoria	Ascoli Piceno
	Aloisi 1'; Giordano 27'	Report	Vialli 21' (pen.); Stefano Pellegrini 89'	Stadium: Stadio Cino e Lillo Del Duca; Referee: Pierluigi Magni

19 March 1989 22	Sampdoria	0–1	Internazionale	Genoa
		Report	Mandorlini 48'	Stadium: Stadio Luigi Ferraris; Referee: Luigi Agnolin

2 April 1989 23	Bologna	0–0	Sampdoria	Bologna
		Report		Stadium: Stadio Renato Dall'Ara; Referee: Romeo Paparesta

9 April 1989 24	Sampdoria	1–2	Fiorentina	Genoa
	Dossena 85'	Report	Pellegrini 19'; Borgonovo 79'	Stadium: Stadio Luigi Ferraris; Referee: Mauro Felicani

16 April 1989 25	Roma	1–0	Sampdoria	Rome
	Desideri 59'	Report		Stadium: Stadio Olimpico; Referee: Pierluigi Magni

30 April 1989 26	Sampdoria	1–2	Juventus	Genoa
	Mancini 20'	Report	De Agostini 68' (pen.); Galia 86'	Stadium: Stadio Luigi Ferraris; Referee: Carlo Sguizzato

6 May 1989 27	Lecce	1–0	Sampdoria	Lecce
	Vanoli 57'	Report		Stadium: Stadio Via del Mare; Referee: Sergio Coppetelli

14 May 1989 28	Sampdoria	1–1	Milan	Genoa
	Pari 36'	Report	Rijkaard 45'	Stadium: Stadio Luigi Ferraris; Referee: Carlo Longhi

21 May 1989 29	Atalanta	1–0	Sampdoria	Bergamo
	Fortunato 84'	Report		Stadium: Stadio Comunale; Referee: Piero Ceccarini

28 May 1989 30	Sampdoria	4–1	Pescara	Genoa
	Vialli 9'; Salsano 48'; Ciarlantini 62' (o.g.); Mancini 80'	Report	Júnior 31'	Stadium: Stadio Luigi Ferraris; Referee: Rosario Lo Bello

4 June 1989 31	Napoli	1–1	Sampdoria	Naples
	Carannante 40'	Report	Cerezo 75'	Stadium: San Paolo; Referee: Werter Cornieti

11 June 1989 32	Sampdoria	2–1	Hellas Verona	Genoa
	Salsano 64'; Pradella 86'	Report	Galderisi 83'	Stadium: Stadio Luigi Ferraris; Referee: Giancarlo Dal Forno

18 June 1989 33	Lazio	1–0	Sampdoria	Rome
	Dezotti 37'	Report		Stadium: Stadio Flaminio; Referee: Arcangelo Pezzella

25 June 1989 34	Sampdoria	2–0	Cesena	Genoa
	Mancini 48', 75'	Report		Stadium: Stadio Luigi Ferraris; Referee: Virginio Quartuccio

==== Topscorers ====
- (Italy) Gianluca Vialli 14
- (Italy) Roberto Mancini 9
- (Italy) Giuseppe Dossena 5

=== Coppa Italia ===
==== First round (Group 8) ====
Pos	Team	Pld	W	D	L	GF	GA	GD	Pts
1	Sampdoria	5	4	1	0	14	2	+12	9
2	Lecce	5	2	2	1	3	2	+1	6
3	Modena	5	3	0	2	7	7	0	6
4	Cremonese	5	3	0	2	5	6	−1	6
5	Padova	5	0	2	3	3	9	−6	2
6	Arezzo	5	0	1	4	2	8	−6	1

21 August 1988 1	Arezzo	0–2	Sampdoria	Arezzo
20:30 CEST			Vierchowod 66', 73'	Stadium: Stadio Comunale; Attendance: 13,128; Referee: Bruno Di Cola

24 August 1988 2	Sampdoria	5–0	Cremonese	Alessandria
20:30 CEST	Vialli 21', 73'; Dossena 34', 40'; Vierchowod 54'			Stadium: Stadio Giuseppe Moccagatta; Attendance: 28,000; Referee: Pierluigi Pairetto

28 August 1988 3	Lecce	0–0	Sampdoria	Lecce
21:00 CEST				Stadium: Stadio Via del Mare; Attendance: 16,000; Referee: Pierluigi Magni

31 August 1988 4	Sampdoria	4–1	Modena	Alessandria
20:30 CEST	Mancini 1'; Vialli 43'; Vierchowod 46'; Cerezo 74'		Sorbello 83' (pen.)	Stadium: Stadio Giuseppe Moccagatta; Attendance: 12,000; Referee: Gianni Beschin

3 September 1988 5	Padova	1–3	Sampdoria	Padova
20:45 CEST	Angelini 2'		Vialli 31', 69'; Pradella 46'	Stadium: Stadio Silvio Appiani; Attendance: 8,400; Referee: Marcello Nicchi

==== Second round (Group 4) ====
Pos	Team	Pld	W	D	L	GF	GA	GD	Pts
1	Sampdoria	3	2	1	0	5	1	+4	5
2	Atalanta	3	2	0	1	5	3	+2	4
3	Bari	3	1	1	1	5	6	−1	3
4	Monza	3	0	0	3	3	8	−5	0

14 September 1988 1	Sampdoria	1–0	Atalanta	Alessandria
20:30 CEST	Vialli 58'			Stadium: Stadio Giuseppe Moccagatta; Attendance: 32,000; Referee: Carlo Sguizzato

21 September 1988 2	Bari	1–1	Sampdoria	Bari
20:30 CEST	Monelli 42'		Vialli 65'	Stadium: Stadio della Vittoria; Attendance: 25,000; Referee: Werter Cornieti

28 September 1988 3	Sampdoria	3–0	Monza	Cremona
20:30 CEST	Vialli 16'; Víctor 21'; Salsano 61'			Stadium: Stadio Giovanni Zini; Attendance: 30,000; Referee: Giancarlo Dal Forno

==== Quarter-finals ====
4 January 1989 First leg	Sampdoria	3–0	Fiorentina	Genoa
14:30 CET	Mancini 14'; Cerezo 25'; Vialli 80'			Stadium: Stadio Luigi Ferraris; Attendance: 13,557; Referee: Tullio Lanese

25 January 1989 Second leg	Fiorentina	1–1 (1–4 agg.)	Sampdoria	Florence
14:30 CET	Pellegrini 7' (o.g.)		Pellegrini 70'	Stadium: Stadio Comunale; Attendance: 8,005; Referee: Moreno Frigerio

==== Semi-finals ====
1 February 1989 First leg	Atalanta	2–3	Sampdoria	Bergamo
14:30 CET	Fortunato 52'; Pasciullo 88'		Strömberg 54' (o.g.); Vialli 60' (pen.), 72'	Stadium: Stadio Comunale; Attendance: 17,668; Referee: Pierluigi Pairetto

8 February 1989 Second leg	Sampdoria	3–1 (6–3 agg.)	Atalanta	Genoa
14:30 CET	Mancini 18', 85'; Vialli 55' (pen.)		Prandelli 68'	Stadium: Stadio Luigi Ferraris; Attendance: 13,945; Referee: Arcangelo Pezzella

==== Final ====
19 June 1989 First leg	Napoli	1–0	Sampdoria	Naples
21:00 CEST	Renica 55'			Stadium: Stadio San Paolo; Attendance: 55,894; Referee: Tullio Lanese

28 June 1989 Second leg	Sampdoria	4–0 (4–1 agg.)	Napoli	Cremona
21:00 CEST	Vialli 32'; Cerezo 38'; Vierchowod 47'; Mancini 59' (pen.)			Stadium: Stadio Giovanni Zini; Attendance: 17,899; Referee: Rosario Lo Bello

=== European Cup Winners' Cup ===
==== First round ====
7 September 1988 First leg	IFK Norrköping (Sweden)	2–1	(Italy) Sampdoria	Norrköping, Sweden
	Andersson 9'; Hellström 86'	Report	Carboni 51'	Stadium: Norrköpings Idrottspark; Attendance: 13,216; Referee: Allan Gunn (England)

6 October 1988 Second leg	Sampdoria (Italy)	2–0 (3–2 agg.)	(Sweden) IFK Norrköping	Cremona, Italy
	Salsano 37'; Vialli 82'	Report		Stadium: Stadio Giovanni Zini; Attendance: 17,683; Referee: Rolf Blattmann (Switzerland)

==== Second round ====
26 October 1988 First leg	Carl Zeiss Jena (East Germany)	1–1	(Italy) Sampdoria	Jena, East Germany
	Weber 38'	Report	Vialli 83' (pen.)	Stadium: Ernst-Abbe-Sportfeld; Attendance: 13,500; Referee: Bo Karlsson (Sweden)

9 November 1988 Second leg	Sampdoria (Italy)	3–1 (4–2 agg.)	(East Germany) Carl Zeiss Jena	Cremona, Italy
	Vierchowod 23'; Cerezo 42'; Vialli 53'	Report	Raab 50'	Stadium: Stadio Giovanni Zini; Attendance: 16,714; Referee: Bob Valentine (Scotland)

==== Quarter-finals ====
1 March 1989 First leg	Dinamo București (Romania)	1–1	(Italy) Sampdoria	Bucharest, Romania
	Vaișcovici 16' (pen.)	Report	Vialli 89'	Stadium: Stadionul Dinamo; Attendance: 12,148; Referee: Horst Brummeier (Austria)

15 March 1989 Second leg	Sampdoria (Italy)	0–0 (1a–1 agg.)	(Romania) Dinamo București	Cremona, Italy
		Report		Stadium: Stadio Giovanni Zini; Attendance: 17,652; Referee: Lajos Németh (Hungary)

==== Semi-finals ====
5 April 1989 First leg	Mechelen (Belgium)	2–1	(Italy) Sampdoria	Mechelen, Belgium
	Ohana 11'; Deferm 67'	Report	Vialli 74'	Stadium: Achter de Kazerne; Attendance: 13,066; Referee: Bruno Galler (Switzerland)

19 April 1989 Second leg	Sampdoria (Italy)	3–0 (4–2 agg.)	(Belgium) Mechelen	Genoa, Italy
	Cerezo 71'; Dossena 85'; Salsano 88'	Report		Stadium: Stadio Luigi Ferraris; Attendance: 18,419; Referee: Jiří Stiegler (Czechoslovakia)

==== Final ====
10 May 1989	Barcelona (Spain)	2–0	(Italy) Sampdoria	Bern, Switzerland
20:15	Salinas 4'; López Rekarte 79'	Report		Stadium: Wankdorf Stadium; Attendance: 42,707; Referee: George Courtney (England)

== Statistics ==
=== Players statistics ===
No.	Pos	Nat	Player	Total		Serie A		Coppa		ECWC	
No.	Pos	Nat	Player	Apps	Goals	Apps	Goals	Apps	Goals	Apps	Goals
	GK	(Italy) ITA	Gianluca Pagliuca	53	-41	33	-25	11	-7	9	-9
	DF	(Italy) ITA	Moreno Mannini	31	0	17+1	0	6	0	7	0
	DF	(Italy) ITA	Pietro Vierchowod	51	7	29	1	14	5	8	1
	DF	(Italy) ITA	Luca Pellegrini	42	1	24	0	11	1	7	0
	DF	(Italy) ITA	Amedeo Carboni	48	2	30+1	1	13	0	4	1
	MF	(Spain) ESP	Víctor Muñoz	53	3	31	2	14	1	8	0
	MF	(Italy) ITA	Fausto Pari	52	1	30	1	13	0	9	0
	MF	(Brazil) BRA	Toninho Cerezo	52	7	29	2	14	3	9	2
	MF	(Italy) ITA	Giuseppe Dossena	57	8	32+2	5	14	2	9	1
	FW	(Italy) ITA	Roberto Mancini	48	14	28+1	9	11	5	8	0
	FW	(Italy) ITA	Gianluca Vialli	51	32	30	14	14	13	7	5
	GK	(Italy) ITA	Guido Bistazzoni	4	-1	1	0	3	-1	0	0
	DF	(Italy) ITA	Marco Lanna	36	0	18+1	0	10	0	7	0
	MF	(Italy) ITA	Fulvio Bonomi	44	2	17+8	2	12	0	7	0
	MF	(Italy) ITA	Fausto Salsano	46	5	14+15	2	11	1	6	2
	DF	(Italy) ITA	Stefano Pellegrini	17	1	7+6	1	1	0	3	0
	FW	(Italy) ITA	Loris Pradella	32	3	4+16	2	8	1	4	0
	MF	(Italy) ITA	Roberto Breda	1	0	0+1	0				
	FW	(Italy) ITA	Enrico Chiesa	1	0	0+1	0				
	GK	(Italy) ITA	Sergio Marcon	0	0	0	0	0	0		
	MF	(Italy) ITA	Emilio Affuso	0	0	0	0				
	DF	(Italy) ITA	Filippo Dal Moro								
	MF	(Italy) ITA	Mirco Gubellini								

- Source: http://calcio-seriea.net/presenze/1988/977/

-

== Sources ==
- RSSSF - Italy 1988/89
