= Bucciarelli =

Bucciarelli is an Italian surname. Notable people with the surname include:

- Antonio Bucciarelli (born 1970), Italian footballer
- Brunetto Bucciarelli-Ducci (1914–1994), Italian politician and magistrate
- Gerald Anthony Bucciarelli (1951–2004), American actor
