= SSC Napoli in European football =

Italian club in European football

- Club: SSC Napoli
- Seasons played: 37
- Most appearances: Marek Hamšík (80)
- Top scorer: Dries Mertens (28)
- First entry: 1962–63 European Cup Winners' Cup
- Latest entry: 2026–27 UEFA Champions League

Titles
- Europa League: 1: 1988–89

These are the matches that Napoli have played in European football competitions. In UEFA European football, Napoli has won the 1988–89 UEFA Cup.

Forward Dries Mertens is the club's record goalscorer in European competitions with 28 goals. Midfielder Marek Hamšík has made the most European appearances with 80.

== UEFA-organised seasonal competitions ==
Napoli's score listed first.

=== European Cup / UEFA Champions League ===
Season	Round	Opponent	Home	Away	Aggregate	Reference
1987–88	First round	(Spain) Real Madrid	1–1	0–2	1–3	
1990–91	First round	(Hungary) Újpest	3–0	2–0	5–0	
1990–91	Second round	(Soviet Union) Spartak Moscow	0–0	0–0 (a.e.t.)	0–0 (3–5 p)	
2011–12	Group stage	(England) Manchester City	2–1	1–1	2nd	
2011–12	Group stage	(Spain) Villarreal	2–0	2–0	2nd	
2011–12	Group stage	(Germany) Bayern Munich	1–1	2–3	2nd	
2011–12	Round of 16	(England) Chelsea	3–1	1–4 (a.e.t.)	4–5	
2013–14	Group stage	(Germany) Borussia Dortmund	2–1	1–3	3rd	
2013–14	Group stage	(England) Arsenal	2–0	0–2	3rd	
2013–14	Group stage	(France) Marseille	3–2	2–1	3rd	
2014–15	Play-off round	(Spain) Athletic Bilbao	1–1	1–3	2–4	
2016–17	Group stage	(Ukraine) Dynamo Kyiv	0–0	2–1	1st	
2016–17	Group stage	(Portugal) Benfica	4–2	2–1	1st	
2016–17	Group stage	(Turkey) Beşiktaş	2–3	1–1	1st	
2016–17	Round of 16	(Spain) Real Madrid	1–3	1–3	2–6	
2017–18	Play-off round	(France) Nice	2–0	2–0	4–0	
2017–18	Group stage	(Ukraine) Shakhtar Donetsk	3–0	1–2	3rd	
2017–18	Group stage	(England) Manchester City	2–4	1–2	3rd	
2017–18	Group stage	(Netherlands) Feyenoord	3–1	1–2	3rd	
2018–19	Group stage	(France) Paris Saint-Germain	1–1	2–2	3rd	
2018–19	Group stage	(England) Liverpool	1–0	0–1	3rd	
2018–19	Group stage	(Serbia) Red Star Belgrade	3–1	0–0	3rd	
2019–20	Group stage	(England) Liverpool	2–0	1–1	2nd	
2019–20	Group stage	(Belgium) Genk	4–0	0–0	2nd	
2019–20	Group stage	(Austria) Red Bull Salzburg	1–1	3–2	2nd	
2019–20	Round of 16	(Spain) Barcelona	1–1	1–3	2–4	
2022–23	Group stage	(England) Liverpool	4–1	0–2	1st	
2022–23	Group stage	(Scotland) Rangers	3–0	3–0	1st	
2022–23	Group stage	(Netherlands) Ajax	4–2	6–1	1st	
2022–23	Round of 16	(Germany) Eintracht Frankfurt	3–0	2–0	5–0	
2022–23	Quarter-finals	(Italy) Milan	1–1	0–1	1–2	
2023–24	Group stage	(Portugal) Braga	2–0	2–1	2nd	
2023–24	Group stage	(Spain) Real Madrid	2–3	2–4	2nd	
2023–24	Group stage	(Germany) Union Berlin	1–1	1–0	2nd	
2023–24	Round of 16	(Spain) Barcelona	1–1	1–3	2–4	
2025–26	League phase	(England) Manchester City	—N/a	0–2	30th	
2025–26	League phase	(Portugal) Sporting CP	2–1	—N/a	30th	
2025–26	League phase	(Netherlands) PSV Eindhoven	—N/a	2–6	30th	
2025–26	League phase	(Germany) Eintracht Frankfurt	0–0	—N/a	30th	
2025–26	League phase	(Azerbaijan) Qarabağ	2–0	—N/a	30th	
2025–26	League phase	(Portugal) Benfica	—N/a	0–2	30th	
2025–26	League phase	(Denmark) Copenhagen	—N/a	1–1	30th	
2025–26	League phase	(England) Chelsea	2–3	—N/a	30th	
2026–27	League phase	(England) Arsenal	0–1	—N/a		
2026–27	League phase	(Spain) Villarreal	—N/a	1–3		
2026–27	League phase	(Norway) Bodø/Glimt	4–3	—N/a		
2026–27	League phase	(Portugal) Porto	—N/a			
2026–27	League phase	(England) Manchester City	—N/a			
2026–27	League phase	(Belgium) Club Brugge		—N/a		
2026–27	League phase	(Azerbaijan) Sabah	—N/a			
2026–27	League phase	(Norway) Viking		—N/a		

=== European Cup Winners' Cup ===
Season	Round	Opponent	Home	Away	Aggregate	Reference
1962–63	Preliminary round	(Wales) Bangor City	3–1	0–2	5–4 (po 2–1)	
1962–63	First round	(Hungary) Újpest	1–1	1–1	5–3 (po 3–1)	
1962–63	Second round	(Socialist Federal Republic of Yugoslavia) OFK Beograd	3–1	0–2	4–6 (po 1–3)	
1976–77	First round	(Norway) Bodø/Glimt	1–0	2–0	3–0	
1976–77	Second round	(Cyprus) APOEL	2–0	1–1	3–1	
1976–77	Quarter-finals	(Poland) Śląsk Wrocław	2–0	0–0	2–0	
1976–77	Semi-finals	(Belgium) Anderlecht	1–0	0–2	1–2	

=== UEFA Cup / UEFA Europa League ===
Season	Round	Opponent	Home	Away	Aggregate	Reference
1971–72	First round	(Romania) Rapid București	1–0	0–2	1–2	
1974–75	First round	(Hungary) Videoton	2–0	1–1	3–1	
1974–75	Second round	(Portugal) Porto	1–0	1–0	2–0	
1974–75	Third round	(Czechoslovakia) Baník Ostrava	0–2	1–1	1–3	
1975–76	First round	(Soviet Union) Torpedo Moscow	1–1	1–4	2–5	
1978–79	First round	(Soviet Union) Dinamo Tbilisi	1–1	0–2	1–3	
1979–80	First round	(Greece) Olympiacos	2–0	0–1	2–1	
1979–80	Second round	(Belgium) Standard Liège	1–1	1–2	2–3	
1981–82	First round	(Socialist Federal Republic of Yugoslavia) Radnički Niš	2–2	0–0	2–2 (a)	
1982–83	First round	(Soviet Union) Dinamo Tbilisi	1–0	1–2	2–2 (a)	
1982–83	Second round	(West Germany) 1. FC Kaiserslautern	1–2	0–2	1–4	
1986–87	First round	(France) Toulouse	1–0	0–1 (a.e.t.)	1–1 (3–4 p)	
1988–89	First round	(Greece) PAOK	1–0	1–1	2–1	
1988–89	Second round	(East Germany) Lokomotive Leipzig	2–0	1–1	3–1	
1988–89	Third round	(France) Bordeaux	0–0	1–0	1–0	
1988–89	Quarter-finals	(Italy) Juventus	3–0 (a.e.t.)	0–2	3–2	
1988–89	Semi-finals	(West Germany) Bayern Munich	2–0	2–2	4–2	
1988–89	Final	(West Germany) VfB Stuttgart	2–1	3–3	5–4	
1989–90	First round	(Portugal) Sporting CP	0–0 (a.e.t.)	0–0	0–0 (4–3 p)	
1989–90	Second round	(Switzerland) Wettingen	2–1	0–0	2–1	
1989–90	Third round	(West Germany) Werder Bremen	2–3	1–5	3–8	
1992–93	First round	(Spain) Valencia	1–0	5–1	6–1	
1992–93	Second round	(France) Paris Saint-Germain	0–2	0–0	0–2	
1994–95	First round	(Latvia) Skonto	2–0	1–0	3–0	
1994–95	Second round	(Portugal) Boavista	2–1	1–1	3–2	
1994–95	Third round	(Germany) Eintracht Frankfurt	0–1	0–1	0–2	
2008–09	Second qualifying round	(Albania) Vllaznia	5–0	3–0	8–0	
2008–09	First round	(Portugal) Benfica	3–2	0–2	3–4	
2010–11	Play-off round	(Sweden) IF Elfsborg	1–0	2–0	3–0	
2010–11	Group stage	(Netherlands) Utrecht	0–0	3–3	2nd	
2010–11	Group stage	(Romania) Steaua București	1–0	3–3	2nd	
2010–11	Group stage	(England) Liverpool	0–0	1–3	2nd	
2010–11	Round of 32	(Spain) Villarreal	0–0	1–2	1–2	
2012–13	Group stage	(Sweden) AIK	4–0	2–1	2nd	
2012–13	Group stage	(Netherlands) PSV Eindhoven	1–3	0–3	2nd	
2012–13	Group stage	(Ukraine) Dnipro Dnipropetrovsk	4–2	1–3	2nd	
2012–13	Round of 32	(Czech Republic) Viktoria Plzeň	0–3	0–2	0–5	
2013–14	Round of 32	(Wales) Swansea City	3–1	0–0	3–1	
2013–14	Round of 16	(Portugal) Porto	2–2	0–1	2–3	
2014–15	Group stage	(Czech Republic) Sparta Prague	3–1	0–0	1st	
2014–15	Group stage	(Slovakia) Slovan Bratislava	3–0	2–0	1st	
2014–15	Group stage	(Switzerland) Young Boys	3–0	0–2	1st	
2014–15	Round of 32	(Turkey) Trabzonspor	1–0	4–0	5–0	
2014–15	Round of 16	(Russia) Dynamo Moscow	3–1	0–0	3–1	
2014–15	Quarter-finals	(Germany) VfL Wolfsburg	2–2	4–1	6–3	
2014–15	Semi-finals	(Ukraine) Dnipro Dnipropetrovsk	1–1	0–1	1–2	
2015–16	Group stage	(Belgium) Club Brugge	5–0	1–0	1st	
2015–16	Group stage	(Poland) Legia Warsaw	5–2	2–0	1st	
2015–16	Group stage	(Denmark) Midtjylland	5–0	4–1	1st	
2015–16	Round of 32	(Spain) Villarreal	1–1	0–1	1–2	
2017–18	Round of 32	(Germany) RB Leipzig	1–3	2–0	3–3 (a)	
2018–19	Round of 32	(Switzerland) Zürich	2–0	3–1	5–1	
2018–19	Round of 16	(Austria) Red Bull Salzburg	3–0	1–3	4–3	
2018–19	Quarter-finals	(England) Arsenal	0–1	0–2	0–3	
2020–21	Group stage	(Spain) Real Sociedad	1–1	1–0	1st	
2020–21	Group stage	(Netherlands) AZ	0–1	1–1	1st	
2020–21	Group stage	(Croatia) Rijeka	2–0	2–1	1st	
2020–21	Round of 32	(Spain) Granada	2–1	0–2	2–3	
2021–22	Group stage	(England) Leicester City	3–2	2–2	2nd	
2021–22	Group stage	(Russia) Spartak Moscow	2–3	1–2	2nd	
2021–22	Group stage	(Poland) Legia Warsaw	3–0	4–1	2nd	
2021–22	Knockout round play-offs	(Spain) Barcelona	2–4	1–1	3–5	

=== UEFA Intertoto Cup ===
Season	Round	Opponent	Home	Away	Aggregate	Reference
2008	Third Round	(Greece) Panionios	1–0	1–0	2–0	

== FIFA-only recognized seasonal competitions ==
=== Inter-Cities Fairs Cup ===
Season	Round	Opponent	Home	Away	Aggregate
1966–67	First round	(Austria) Wiener Sport-Club	3–1	2–1	5–2
1966–67	Second round	(Denmark) B 1909	2–1	4–1	6–2
1966–67	Third round	(England) Burnley	0–0	0–3	0–3
1967–68	First round	(West Germany) Hannover 96	4–0	1–1	5–1
1967–68	Second round	(Scotland) Hibernian	4–1	0–5	4–6
1968–69	First round	(Switzerland) Grasshopper	3–1	0–1	3–2
1968–69	Second round	(England) Leeds United	2–0 (a.e.t.)	0–2	2–2 (c)
1969–70	First round	(France) Metz	2–1	1–1	3–2
1969–70	Second round	(Germany) VfB Stuttgart	1–0	0–0	1–0
1969–70	Third round	(Netherlands) Ajax	1–0	0–4 (a.e.t.)	1–4

== Overall record ==
=== By competition ===
As of 20 October 2026

Competition	Pld	W	D	L	GF	GA	GD	Win%
European Cup / UEFA Champions League	81	35	20	26	132	108	+24	43.21
European Cup Winners' Cup	17	9	4	4	23	16	+7	52.94
UEFA Cup / UEFA Europa League	124	54	33	37	183	135	+48	43.55
UEFA Intertoto Cup	2	2	0	0	2	0	+2	100.00
Total	224	100	57	67	340	259	+81	44.64

Source: UEFA.com
Pld = Matches played; W = Matches won; D = Matches drawn; L = Matches lost; GF = Goals for; GA = Goals against; GD = Goal Difference.

=== By club ===
As of 20 October 2026
Key

Positive balance (more wins than losses)
Neutral balance (as many wins as losses)
Negative balance (more losses than wins)

Club	Pld	W	D	L	GF	GA	GD
(Spain) Real Madrid	6	0	1	5	7	16	−9
(Spain) Barcelona	6	0	4	3	9	12	–6
(Hungary) Újpest	5	2	2	1	8	5	+3
(England) Manchester City	5	1	1	3	6	10	−4
(Russia) Spartak Moscow	4	0	2	2	3	5	−2
(Spain) Villarreal	7	2	2	3	7	7	0
(Germany) Bayern Munich	4	1	2	1	7	6	+1
(England) Chelsea	3	1	0	2	6	8	−2
(Germany) Borussia Dortmund	2	1	0	1	3	4	−1
(England) Arsenal	5	1	0	4	2	6	−4
(France) Marseille	2	2	0	0	5	3	+2
(Austria) Red Bull Salzburg	4	2	1	1	8	6	+2
(Spain) Athletic Bilbao	2	0	1	1	2	4	−2
(Ukraine) Dynamo Kyiv	2	1	1	0	2	1	+1
(Portugal) Benfica	5	3	0	2	9	9	0
(Turkey) Beşiktaş	2	0	1	1	3	4	−1
(France) Nice	2	2	0	0	4	0	+4
(Ukraine) Shakhtar Donetsk	2	1	0	1	4	2	+2
(Netherlands) Feyenoord	2	1	0	1	4	3	+1
(Romania) Rapid București	2	1	0	1	1	2	−1
(Croatia) Rijeka	2	2	0	0	4	1	+3
(Hungary) Videoton	2	1	1	0	3	1	+2
(Portugal) Porto	4	2	1	1	4	3	+1
(Czech Republic) Baník Ostrava	2	0	1	1	1	3	−2
(Russia) Torpedo Moscow	2	0	1	1	2	5	−3
(Georgia (country)) Dinamo Tbilisi	4	1	1	2	3	5	−2
(Greece) Olympiacos	2	1	0	1	2	1	+1
(Belgium) Standard Liège	2	1	0	1	2	3	−1
(Belgium) Genk	2	1	1	0	4	0	+4
(Spain) Granada	2	1	0	1	2	3	−1
(Serbia) Radnički Niš	2	0	2	0	2	2	0
(Serbia) Red Star Belgrade	2	1	0	1	3	1	+2
(Germany) 1. FC Kaiserslautern	2	0	0	2	1	4	−3
(France) Toulouse	2	1	0	1	1	1	0
(Greece) PAOK	2	1	1	0	2	1	+1
(Germany) Lokomotive Leipzig	2	1	1	0	3	1	+2
(France) Bordeaux	2	1	1	0	1	0	+1
(Italy) Juventus	2	1	0	1	3	2	+1
(Germany) VfB Stuttgart	4	2	2	0	6	4	+2
(Portugal) Sporting CP	3	1	2	0	2	1	+1
(Switzerland) Wettingen	2	1	1	0	2	1	+1
(Germany) Werder Bremen	2	0	0	2	3	8	−5
(Spain) Valencia	2	2	0	0	6	1	+5
(France) Paris Saint-Germain	4	0	3	1	3	5	−2
(Latvia) Skonto	2	2	0	0	3	0	+3
(Portugal) Boavista	2	1	1	0	3	2	+1
(Germany) Eintracht Frankfurt	5	2	1	2	5	2	0
(Albania) Vllaznia	2	2	0	0	8	0	+8
(Sweden) Elfsborg	2	2	0	0	3	0	+3
(Netherlands) Utrecht	2	0	2	0	3	3	0
(Romania) Steaua București	2	1	1	0	4	3	+1
(England) Liverpool	8	3	2	3	9	8	+1
(Sweden) AIK	2	2	0	0	6	1	+5
(Netherlands) PSV Eindhoven	3	0	0	3	3	12	−9
(Ukraine) Dnipro	4	1	1	2	6	7	−1
(Czech Republic) Viktoria Plzeň	2	0	0	2	0	5	−5
(England) Swansea City	2	1	1	0	3	1	+2
(Czech Republic) Sparta Prague	2	1	1	0	3	1	+2
(Slovakia) Slovan Bratislava	2	2	0	0	5	0	+5
(Switzerland) Young Boys	2	1	0	1	3	2	+1
(Switzerland) Zürich	2	2	0	0	5	1	+4
(Turkey) Trabzonspor	2	2	0	0	5	0	+5
(Russia) Dynamo Moscow	2	1	1	0	3	1	+2
(Germany) VfL Wolfsburg	2	1	1	0	6	3	+3
(Belgium) Club Brugge	2	2	0	0	6	0	+6
(Poland) Legia Warsaw	4	4	0	0	14	3	+11
(Denmark) Midtjylland	2	2	0	0	9	1	+8
(Germany) RB Leipzig	2	1	0	1	3	3	0
(Wales) Bangor City	3	2	0	1	5	4	+1
(Serbia) OFK Beograd	3	1	0	2	4	6	−2
(Norway) Bodø/Glimt	3	3	0	0	7	3	+4
(Cyprus) APOEL	2	1	1	0	3	1	+2
(Poland) Śląsk Wrocław	2	1	1	0	2	0	+2
(Belgium) Anderlecht	2	1	0	1	1	2	−1
(Greece) Panionios	2	2	0	0	2	0	+2
(Austria) Wiener Sport-Club	2	2	0	0	5	2	+3
(Denmark) B 1909	2	2	0	0	6	2	+4
(England) Burnley	2	0	1	1	0	3	−3
(Germany) Hannover 96	2	1	1	0	5	1	+4
(Scotland) Hibernian	2	1	0	1	4	6	−2
(Switzerland) Grasshopper	2	1	0	1	3	2	+1
(England) Leeds United	2	1	0	1	2	2	0
(England) Leicester City	2	1	1	0	5	4	+1
(France) Metz	2	1	1	0	3	2	+1
(Netherlands) Ajax	4	3	0	1	11	7	+4
(Netherlands) AZ	2	0	1	1	1	2	−1
(Spain) Real Sociedad	2	1	2	0	2	1	+1
(Scotland) Rangers	2	2	0	0	6	0	+6
(Italy) Milan	2	0	1	1	1	2	−1
(Portugal) Braga	2	2	0	0	4	1	+3
(Germany) Union Berlin	2	1	1	0	2	1	+1
(Azerbaijan) Qarabağ	1	1	0	0	2	0	+2
(Denmark) Copenhagen	1	0	1	0	1	1	0
