= Simone Giacchetta =

Italian footballer

Personal information
- Date of birth: 28 July 1969 (age 57)
- Place of birth: Ancona, Italy
- Height: 1.83 m (6 ft 0 in)
- Position: Centre-back

Senior career*
Years	Team	Apps	(Gls)
1986–1988	Civitanovese	33	(8)
1988–1989	Napoli	3	(1)
1989–1991	Taranto	54	(3)
1991–2000	Reggina	266	(16)
2000–2003	Genoa	84	(2)
2003–2004	Reggina	8	(0)
2004–2005	Torino	12	(0)
Total		465	(30)
- * Club domestic league appearances and goals

Simone Giacchetta (born 28 July 1969), is an Italian former professional footballer who played as a centre-back.

== Career ==
Giacchetta began his career as a forward at Civitanovese in 1986, standing out and joining Napoli. He was part of the 1988–89 UEFA Cup winning squad as an option for Andrea Carnevale and Careca. He scored a single goal for the club, against Atalanta in the 1988–89 Serie A. He later played for Taranto and arrived at Reggina in 1991, where he became a defender and made more than 265 appearances for the club. Giacchetta also played for Genoa and Torino, where he retired at the end of the 2004–05 season.

== Post career ==
Giacchetta became a sporting director, working on traditional teams such as AlbinoLeffe and US Cremonese. In 2010 he was cured of bone cancer.

== Honours ==
Napoli

- UEFA Cup: 1988–89

Taranto

- Serie C1: 1989–90 (group B)

Reggina

- Serie C1: 1994–95 (group B)
