= Nils Schmäler =

German footballer

Personal information
- Date of birth: 10 November 1969 (age 56)
- Place of birth: Lüneburg, West Germany
- Position: Defender

Youth career
- 1976–1984: SC Victoria Braunschweig
- 1985–1987: Eintracht Braunschweig

Senior career*
Years	Team	Apps	(Gls)
1987–1988	Eintracht Braunschweig	27	(4)
1988–1992	VfB Stuttgart	64	(2)
1992–1994	Dynamo Dresden	25	(2)
- VfR Heilbronn
- SpVg Aurich
- * Club domestic league appearances and goals

Nils Schmäler (born 10 November 1969) is a German former professional footballer who played as a defender. He spent six seasons in the Bundesliga with VfB Stuttgart and Dynamo Dresden. His twin brother Olaf Schmäler also played professionally. As of 2008, he worked as a scout for Manchester United.

== Honours ==
VfB Stuttgart

- UEFA Cup finalist: 1988–89
- Bundesliga: 1991–92
