= Massimo Crippa =

Italian footballer (born 1965)

Personal information
- Date of birth: 17 May 1965 (age 61)
- Place of birth: Seregno, Italy
- Height: 1.78 m (5 ft 10 in)
- Position: Midfielder

Team information
- Current team: Renate (Sporting director)

Youth career
- Meda

Senior career*
Years	Team	Apps	(Gls)
1983–1985	A.S.D. Saronno 1910	28	(0)
1985–1986	Seregno	30	(1)
1986–1987	Pavia	31	(2)
1987–1988	Torino	29	(3)
1988–1993	Napoli	150	(9)
1993–1998	Parma	147	(9)
1998–2000	Torino	10	(1)
2000–2002	U.S. Canzese		
2003	Seregno		

International career
1996	Italy Olympic (O.P.)	3	(0)
1988–1996	Italy	17	(1)
- * Club domestic league appearances and goals

Massimo Crippa (Italian pronunciation: [ˈmassimo ˈkrippa]; born 17 May 1965) is an Italian former professional footballer, who played as a midfielder; he is the current sporting director of Renate. Crippa played for several Italian clubs throughout his career, winning several titles during his spells with Napoli and Parma. At international level, he represented the Italy national football team at the 1988 and the 1996 Summer Olympics.

== Club career ==
A determined and physically powerful player, Crippa began his playing career in the 1981–82 season with A.C. Meda Mobil in the Prima Categoria, where he spent two seasons in the first team. He later moved to FBC Saronno in the Eccellenza Lombardy, the sixth tier of Italian club football, where he played for two seasons before joining his hometown club, Seregno. His performances earned him a move to nearby Serie C2 club Pavia in the summer of 1986. After only one season with the club, he moved to Torino in Serie A. In the 1987–88 season he scored three goals for the Turin club in 29 league appearances.

Crippa left Torino in the summer of 1988 to join Napoli. Playing behind Diego Maradona, Crippa joined a midfield that also included Alemão, Fernando De Napoli and Francesco Romano. In his first season with the club, Crippa helped Napoli to finish second in Serie A and to win the UEFA Cup, beating VfB Stuttgart in the final. In the following season, he helped Napoli to fend off the challenge of A.C. Milan to win the Scudetto. He scored a goal as Napoli defeated Juventus 5–1 in the 1990 Supercoppa Italiana.

Crippa moved to Parma in the summer of 1993 and in his first season he was part of the team that won the UEFA Super Cup over two legs against A.C. Milan. Parma lost the first leg, played at the Stadio Ennio Tardini, 0–1, but won the second leg 2–0 with Crippa scoring the decisive goal in extra time. Crippa won his second UEFA Cup at the end of the 1994–95 season as Parma defeated Juventus 2–1 on aggregate. Parma had finished second behind Juventus in that season's Serie A, and would do so again in the 1995–96 season. Crippa was part of Parma's first Champions League campaign during the 1997–98 season.

In 1998, Crippa returned to Torino, who were playing in Serie B; the team were promoted in his first season back at the club. He returned to the Eccellenza Lombardy in 2000 with Canzese, where he played until 2002. He finished his career in 2003 playing for his hometown club, Seregno.

== International career ==
After playing for the under-21 team, Crippa went on to make 17 appearances for Italy between 1988 and 1996. He made his debut in a 2–0 home win over Scotland on 22 December 1988, and he scored his only international goal in a 3–1 friendly win against Turkey on 14 December 1994. Crippa also represented Italy at two Olympic Games: Seoul 1988, and Atlanta 1996 as an overage player under manager Cesare Maldini. He scored the decisive goal in the 2–1 quarter-final victory against Sweden at the 1988 Olympics, as Italy reached the semi-finals, eventually finishing the tournament in fourth place.

== Style of play ==
A hard-working and physically strong team player, Crippa was known for his dedication, power, tenacity and stamina on the pitch, which enabled him to excel as a ball-winner in midfield and support his more creative and offensive-minded teammates.

== Managerial career ==
Crippa was appointed the sporting director of Renate in Lega Pro Seconda Divisione in the summer of 2010, a position which he currently holds.

== Honours ==
Napoli

- Serie A: 1989–90
- Supercoppa Italiana: 1990
- UEFA Cup: 1988–89

Parma

- UEFA Cup: 1994–95
- UEFA Super Cup: 1993
