= Eberhard Trautner =

German footballer

Personal information
- Date of birth: 7 February 1967 (age 59)
- Place of birth: Stuttgart, West Germany
- Height: 1.84 m (6 ft 0 in)
- Position: Goalkeeper

Youth career
- FSV Oßweil
- SpVgg Ludwigsburg
- VfB Stuttgart

Senior career*
Years	Team	Apps	(Gls)
1986–2001	VfB Stuttgart	32	(0)
2000	VfB Stuttgart II	5	(0)
- * Club domestic league appearances and goals

Eberhard Trautner (born 7 February 1967 in Stuttgart) is a retired German footballer who is the currently goalkeeper coach of the 1. FC Köln under-21 team.

== Football career ==
During his career, Trautner played solely for hometown club VfB Stuttgart. However, he only amassed 32 first division appearances during 15 seasons: first he backed up legendary Eike Immel for nine years, then played second-choice to 19-year-old Marc Ziegler in 1995–96, retiring in 2001 after four years in the shadow of Franz Wohlfahrt.

One year after retiring, Trautner began coaching Stuttgart's goalkeepers. In 2011, he was replaced in the post by Andreas Menger. On 6 May 2016, he signed with RB Leipzig to be their goalkeeper coordinator.

Trautner joined the 1. FC Köln reserve team as goalkeeping coach in July 2023. In January 2023, following the departure of Steffen Baumgart as head coach and Uwe Gospodarek as goalkeeper coach, Trautner took over the coaching for the first team's goalkeepers.

== Honours ==
VfB Stuttgart

- Bundesliga: 1991–92
- DFB-Pokal: 1996–97
- DFB-Ligapokal: Runner-up 1997, 1998
- UEFA Cup: Runner-up 1988–89
- UEFA Cup Winners' Cup: Runner-up 1997–98

== See also ==
- List of one-club men
