= Antonio Aloisi =

Italian footballer and manager (born 1968)

Personal information
- Date of birth: 28 August 1968 (age 58)
- Place of birth: Ascoli Piceno, Italy
- Height: 1.87 m (6 ft 1 1/2 in)
- Position: Defender

Senior career*
Years	Team	Apps	(Gls)
1986–1992	Ascoli	124	(3)
1992–1993	Torino	9	(0)
1993–1994	Cagliari	8	(0)
1994–1997	Cesena	86	(3)
1997–1998	Reggina	22	(4)
1998–2001	Ascoli	70	(4)
2001–2003	Acireale	48	(1)
2003–2004	Cavese	30	(0)
2004–2006	Gubbio	51	(1)
2006–2007	Santegidiese		

Managerial career
- 2007: Santegidiese
- 2008–2010: Reggina
- 2010–2013: Ascoli (assistant)
- 2013: Avellino (assistant)
- 2014–2015: Savona
- * Club domestic league appearances and goals as of 23 April 2015

Antonio Aloisi (born 28 August 1968) is an Italian retired footballer and active manager. He played for most of his career for Ascoli in the Italian Serie A.
