= Careca =

Brazilian footballer (born 1960)

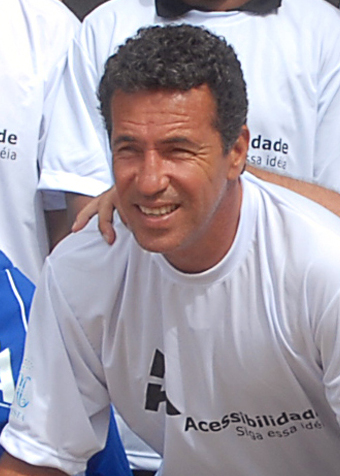
- Careca in 2008

Personal information
- Full name: Antônio de Oliveira Filho
- Date of birth: 5 October 1960 (age 66)
- Place of birth: Araraquara, Brazil
- Height: 1.83 m (6 ft 0 in)
- Position: Striker

Senior career*
Years	Team	Apps	(Gls)
1978–1982	Guarani	77	(46)
1983–1987	São Paulo	67	(54)
1987–1993	Napoli	164	(73)
1993–1996	Kashiwa Reysol	60	(31)
1997	Santos	9	(2)
1998	Campinas	10	(6)
1999	São José-RS	2	(0)
Total		389	(212)

International career
1982–1993	Brazil	64	(30)
- * Club domestic league appearances and goals

Antônio de Oliveira Filho (born 5 October 1960), better known as Careca (Portuguese pronunciation: [kaˈɾɛkɐ]), is a Brazilian former professional footballer who played as a forward. A prolific striker, he was noted for his finishing ability, movement and pace.

Careca began his career in Brazil and played for several clubs, most notably Guarani, São Paulo and Italian club Napoli. At Napoli, he formed part of the club's successful late-1980s side alongside Diego Maradona, helping the team win major domestic and European honours. At international level, he earned over 60 caps for the Brazil national team and represented Brazil at the 1986 and 1990 FIFA World Cups.

== Club career ==
Careca began his footballing career in his home state of São Paulo with local side Guarani in 1978. With his finishing ability and devastating pace quickly established himself as one of his country's best young strikers. With Guarani, he won the Brazilian Championship during his first season and the Brazilian Second Division in 1981.

By 1983, he had been signed by São Paulo, he continued to gather notoriety because of his impressive goals to games ratio and by 1986, Careca led São Paulo to the Brazilian Championship, beating his former club Guarani in the final. He was awarded Bola de Ouro the same year, which is the Brazilian equivalent of Footballer of the Year.

=== Move to Napoli ===
"You must get this guy"

— Diego Maradona, urging Napoli's owners to sign Careca.

In the summer of 1987, Careca moved to Italian Serie A champions Napoli. In his first season at the club, he was part of the "Ma-Gi-Ca" forward trio along with Diego Maradona and Bruno Giordano, and scored 18 goals across all competitions. The team, however, did not win any silverware, having been knocked out in the first round of the European Cup by Real Madrid and lost the Serie A race in the final games of the season, particularly the 2–3 loss at home against the eventual winners AC Milan.

However, his second season was far more successful. The team won the UEFA Cup, with Careca scoring a goal in each leg of the final, one a memorable lobbed goal, and finished second in Serie A, also reaching the Coppa Italia final that season. In 1990, Careca finally won the Scudetto with Napoli, following the success up with the first ever Supercoppa Italiana later that year. Careca spent a further three years with Napoli, establishing a partnership with Gianfranco Zola, during which Napoli failed to win any silverware.

=== Later stages of playing career ===
In 1993, Careca left Italy to play for a new Japanese J.League team Kashiwa Reysol. Careca spent three years with the team, during which time he helped them to promotion to the J1 league in 1994. He returned to Brazil in 1997, where he played Santos for one seasons, and for Cambinas for one season, before joining the lower-league team São José (RS) where he finished his career in 1999.

Careca retired having played 64 games for Brazil, and scoring 30 goals.

Garforth Town owner and manager, Simon Clifford, persuaded Careca to play the majority of a friendly game against Guiseley in the summer of 2005.

=== Footballing name ===
The word careca is Portuguese for 'bald'. It was a nickname given to Careca as a child because of his admiration for a famous Brazilian clown of the same name.

=== Other Carecas ===
Two contemporaries of Careca, who like him played for the Brazil national football team, were also called Careca and are thus sometimes confused with him: Careca II and Careca Bianchezi.

== International career ==
Careca first broke into the national side of Brazil during 1982, but was forced to miss the 1982 World Cup in Spain due to a thigh injury suffered in practice three days before Brazil's debut in that tournament. His place in the squad for that tournament was taken by Roberto Dinamite. He was also part of the Brazilian squad that came in second in the 1983 Copa América.

It was during the 1986 World Cup, in Mexico, that Careca really established himself in world football. He ended the tournament, during which Brazil were memorably eliminated on penalties by France at the quarter-final stage, with five goals, which placed him second in the Golden Boot rankings behind England's Gary Lineker. In 1990, Careca was part of the Brazilian team that was defeated by Argentina in the second round. He scored two goals in the tournament. His last cap was earned in August 1993.

== Style of play ==
"The player with whom I formed the best partnership was Careca"

— Diego Maradona, on his partnership with Careca.

Careca is regarded as one of the greatest strikers in the history of Brazilian football. He was a prolific, fast, opportunistic, and powerful striker, with excellent technique and great striking ability. Despite being right-footed, he was also capable of scoring with his left foot, and he was known for his ability to score goals off-balance from angled shots even when running with the ball. Careca was also good in the air, and he had an excellent positional sense, which along with his intelligence, sense of space, and attacking movement, made him known for frequently being in the right position at the right time in the penalty area. Although he was usually deployed as a striker, he was also capable of playing in deeper positions, as a creative forward, due to his ability to play off of his teammates and provide them with assists, as well as his tendency to make attacking runs starting from outside the area in order to create space for other players. After scoring a goal, Careca often celebrated by mimicking an aeroplane's wings with his arms outstretched.

== Career statistics ==
=== Club ===
Appearances and goals by club, season and competition
Club	Season	League			State league (Note: Includes Campeonato Paulista)		National cup (Note: Includes Coppa Italia, Emperor's Cup)		Continental		Other		Total	
Club	Season	Division	Apps	Goals	Apps	Goals	Apps	Goals	Apps	Goals	Apps	Goals	Apps	Goals
Guarani	1978	Série A	28	13	21	12			—		—		49	25
Guarani	1979	Série A	1	0	49	16			7 (Note: Appearances in Copa Libertadores)	0	—		57	16
Guarani	1980	Série A	17	7	38	16			—		—		55	23
Guarani	1981	Série A	14	8	34	13			—		—		48	21
Guarani	1982	Série A	17	18	28	11			—		—		45	29
Guarani	Total		77	46	170	68			7	0	—		254	114
São Paulo	1983	Série A	20	17	33	15			—		—		53	32
São Paulo	1984	Série A			37	14			—		—		37	14
São Paulo	1985	Série A	17	12	31	23			—		—		48	35
São Paulo	1986	Série A	30	25	13	7			—		—		43	32
São Paulo	1987	Série A							2	1	—		2	1
São Paulo	Total		67	54	114	59			2	1	—		183	114
Napoli	1987–88	Serie A	26	13	—		7	5	1 (Note: Appearances in European Cup)	0	—		34	18
Napoli	1988–89	Serie A	30	19	—		10	2	12 (Note: Appearances in UEFA Cup)	6	—		52	27
Napoli	1989–90	Serie A	22	10	—		1	0	6	2	—		29	12
Napoli	1990–91	Serie A	29	9	—		6	1	2	0	1 (Note: Appearance in Supercoppa Italiana)	2	38	12
Napoli	1991–92	Serie A	33	15	—		4	2	—		—		37	17
Napoli	1992–93	Serie A	24	7	—		3	3	—		—		27	10
Napoli	Total		164	73	—		31	13	21	8	1	2	217	96
Kashiwa Reysol	1993	Football League			—		6	4	—		—		6	4
Kashiwa Reysol	1994	Football League	25	19	—		1	1	—		—		26	20
Kashiwa Reysol	1995	J1 League	30	10	—				—		—		30	10
Kashiwa Reysol	1996	J1 League	5	2	—		6	3	—		—		11	5
Kashiwa Reysol	Total		60	31	—		13	8	—		—		73	39
Santos	1997	Série A												
Career total			368	204	284	127	44	21	30	9	1	2	727	363

=== International ===
Appearances and goals by national team and year
National team	Year	Apps	Goals
Brazil	1982	4	0
Brazil	1983	11	5
Brazil	1984	0	0
Brazil	1985	7	3
Brazil	1986	11	8
Brazil	1987	4	2
Brazil	1988	0	0
Brazil	1989	6	6
Brazil	1990	7	3
Brazil	1991	1	0
Brazil	1992	2	0
Brazil	1993	7	2
Total		60	29

Scores and results list Brazil's goal tally first, score column indicates score after each Careca goal.

List of international goals scored by Careca
No.	Date	Venue	Opponent	Score	Result	Competition	Ref.
1	28 April 1983	Maracanã Stadium, Rio de Janeiro, Brazil	Chile	–	3–2	Friendly	
2	8 June 1983	Estádio Cidade de Coimbra, Coimbra, Portugal	Portugal	1–0	4–0	Friendly	
3	8 June 1983	Estádio Cidade de Coimbra, Coimbra, Portugal	Portugal	3–0	4–0	Friendly	
4	17 June 1983	St. Jakob-Park, Basel, Switzerland	Switzerland	2–1	2–1	Friendly	
5	22 June 1983	Ullevi, Gothenburg, Sweden	Sweden	2–2	3–3	Friendly	
6	2 May 1985	Estádio do Arruda, Recife, Brazil	Uruguay	–	2–0	Friendly	
7	5 May 1985	Estádio Fonte Nova, Salvador, Brazil	Argentina	1–0	2–1	Friendly	
8	30 June 1985	Estádio do Morumbi, São Paulo, Brazil	Bolivia	–	1–1	1986 FIFA World Cup qualification	
9	1 April 1986	Castelão, São Luís, Brazil	Peru	4–0	4–0	Friendly	
10	8 April 1986	Estádio Serra Dourada, Goiânia, Brazil	East Germany	3–0	3–0	Friendly	
11	30 April 1986	Estádio do Arruda, Recife, Brazil	Yugoslavia	4–2	4–2	Friendly	
12	6 June 1986	Estadio Jalisco, Guadalajara, Mexico	Algeria	1–0	1–0	1986 FIFA World Cup	
13	12 June 1986	Estadio Jalisco, Guadalajara, Mexico	Northern Ireland	1–0	3–0	1986 FIFA World Cup	
14	12 June 1986	Estadio Jalisco, Guadalajara, Mexico	Northern Ireland	3–0	3–0	1986 FIFA World Cup	
15	16 June 1986	Estadio Jalisco, Guadalajara, Mexico	Poland	4–0	4–0	1986 FIFA World Cup	
16	21 June 1986	Estadio Jalisco, Guadalajara, Mexico	France	1–0	1–1	1986 FIFA World Cup	
17	21 June 1987	Estádio da Ressacada, Florianópolis, Brazil	Ecuador	–	4–1	Friendly	
18	28 June 1987	Estadio Córdoba, Córdoba, Argentina	Venezuela	3–0	5–0	1987 Copa América	
19	20 August 1989	Estádio do Morumbi, São Paulo, Brazil	Venezuela	1–0	6–0	1990 FIFA World Cup qualification	
20	20 August 1989	Estádio do Morumbi, São Paulo, Brazil	Venezuela	2–0	6–0	1990 FIFA World Cup qualification	
21	20 August 1989	Estádio do Morumbi, São Paulo, Brazil	Venezuela	5–0	6–0	1990 FIFA World Cup qualification	
22	20 August 1989	Estádio do Morumbi, São Paulo, Brazil	Venezuela	6–0	6–0	1990 FIFA World Cup qualification	
23	3 September 1989	Maracanã Stadium, Rio de Janeiro, Brazil	Chile	–	2–0	1990 FIFA World Cup qualification	
24	20 December 1989	De Kuip, Rotterdam, Netherlands	Netherlands	1–0	1–0	Friendly	
25	13 May 1990	Maracanã Stadium, Rio de Janeiro, Brazil	East Germany	2–1	3–3	Friendly	
26	10 June 1990	Juventus Stadium, Turin, Italy	Sweden	1–0	2–1	1990 FIFA World Cup	
27	10 June 1990	Juventus Stadium, Turin, Italy	Sweden	2–0	2–1	1990 FIFA World Cup	
28	6 June 1993	Yale Bowl, New Haven, United States	United States	1–0	2–0	1993 U.S. Cup	
29	10 June 1993	Robert F. Kennedy Memorial Stadium, Washington, United States	Germany	2–0	3–3	1993 U.S. Cup	

== Honours ==
Guarani

- Campeonato Brasileiro Série A: 1978

São Paulo

- Campeonato Brasileiro Série A: 1986
- Campeonato Paulista: 1985, 1987

Napoli

- Serie A: 1989–90
- Supercoppa Italiana: 1990
- UEFA Cup: 1988–89

Individual

- Bola de Prata: 1982, 1985, 1986
- Bola de Ouro: 1986
- Campeonato Paulista top scorer: 1985
- Campeonato Brasileiro Série A top scorer: 1986
- FIFA World Cup Silver Boot: 1986
- South American Team of the Year: 1986

== See also ==
- List of FIFA World Cup top goalscorers
