= Giuliano Giuliani =

Italian footballer

Personal information
- Date of birth: 29 September 1958
- Place of birth: Rome, Italy
- Date of death: 14 November 1996 (aged 38)
- Place of death: Bologna, Italy
- Height: 1.81 m (5 ft 11 1/2 in)
- Position: Goalkeeper

Senior career*
Years	Team	Apps	(Gls)
1976–1980	Arezzo	52	(0)
1980–1985	Como	135	(0)
1985–1988	Verona	86	(0)
1988–1990	Napoli	64	(0)
1990–1993	Udinese	76	(0)
Total		413	(0)
- * Club domestic league appearances and goals

Giuliano Giuliani (29 September 1958 – 14 November 1996) was an Italian professional football player who played as a goalkeeper.

== Club career ==
Giuliani developed in the Arezzo youth sector and later made his professional debut with the senior squad. He made his Serie A debut during the 1980–81 season with Como. In 1985, he moved to Verona and in 1988 he moved to Maradona's Napoli, where he achieved notable success and recognition due to his performances; with the club, he won an UEFA Cup (1988–89) and a Serie A title (1989–90). He later moved to Udinese in 1990, where he ended his career, retiring from professional football in 1993.

== International career ==
Giuliani represented Italy at the 1988 Summer Olympics, where the team finished in fourth place after reaching the semi-finals of the tournament.

== Style of play ==
Giuliani was known to be an efficient rather than spectacular goalkeeper, with a good all-round game and few weaknesses, being adept both in his shot-stopping between the posts and at rushing off his line, and often produced decisive saves throughout his career. Although he was known for his reserved character, he also excelled at organising his team's defensive line.

== Personal life ==
Giuliani was married to the Italian showgirl and television personality Raffaella Del Rosario. The couple met in 1987 and were wed in 1988; together they had a daughter, Gessica, born in 1989.

Giuliani believed that he contracted the HIV virus in 1989 in Buenos Aires during Diego Maradona's wedding party on 7 November. There he met a woman – possibly a prostitute – who he believed had infected him; in 1991, Giuliani confided to his wife that he had betrayed her only on that one occasion. The news of his illness was leaked by the media in 1992, and there were initially rumours in the press that his disease was related to drug use, which were later discredited however. He subsequently retired to Bologna in 1993, where he ran a clothing store and received treatment for the disease. Although Giuliani and Del Rosario had separated in 1991, she tended to him throughout his illness. Giuliani died from a pulmonary complications which arose as a result of AIDS on 14 November 1996, at the Policlinico Sant'Orsola-Malpighi in Bologna.

== Honours ==
=== Club ===
Napoli

- Serie A: 1989–90
- UEFA Cup: 1988–89
