= Olaf Schmäler =

German footballer

Personal information
- Date of birth: 10 November 1969 (age 56)
- Place of birth: Lüneburg, West Germany
- Position: Forward

Youth career
- 1976–1987: Victoria Braunschweig
- 1987–1988: Eintracht Braunschweig

Senior career*
| Years | Team | Apps | (Gls) |
| 1987–1988 | Eintracht Braunschweig | 33 | (13) |
| 1988–1992 | VfB Stuttgart | 29 | (5) |
| 1992–1993 | Waldhof Mannheim | 17 | (3) |
| 1995–1996 | VfR Heilbronn | 1 | (0) |
| Total | | 80 | (21) |

International career
| 1990 | Germany Olympic | 1 | (0) |
- * Club domestic league appearances and goals

Olaf Schmäler (born 10 November 1969) is a German former footballer who played as a forward. He is the twin brother of footballer Nils Schmäler.
