= Antonio Bucciarelli =

Italian footballer (born 1970)

Personal information
- Date of birth: 13 August 1970 (age 56)
- Place of birth: Naples, Italy
- Height: 1.75 m (5 ft 9 in)
- Position: Midfielder

Senior career*
Years	Team	Apps	(Gls)
1988–1990	Napoli	4	(0)
1990–1994	Giarre	76	(3)
1994–1995	Juve Stabia	17	(0)
1995–1997	Nocerina	45	(0)
1997–1998	Tricase	25	(0)
1998–1999	Trapani	11	(0)
1999–2000	Nardò	8	(0)
1999–2002	Palmese	85	(6)
2002–2003	Savoia	29	(0)
2003–2004	Vittoria	28	(1)
2004	Siracusa	12	(0)
2005	Giarre	11	(0)
2005–2006	Sangiuseppese	29	(0)
2006–2007	Aversa Normanna	14	(0)
- * Club domestic league appearances and goals

Antonio Bucciarelli (born 13 August 1970) is a retired Italian professional footballer who played as a midfielder. He played along with Maradona in the Napoli team that won the Serie A title in 1990.

== Honours ==
Napoli

- UEFA Cup winner: 1988–89 (did not play any games but was on the roster).
- Serie A champion: 1989–90.
