= 1988–89 Coppa Italia =

Tournament details
- Country: Italy
- Dates: 21 Aug 1988 – 28 June 1989
- Teams: 48

Final positions
- Champions: Sampdoria (3rd title)
- Runners-up: Napoli

Tournament statistics
- Matches played: 170
- Goals scored: 447 (2.63 per match)
- Top goal scorer: Gianluca Vialli (13 goals)

The 1988–89 Coppa Italia was the 42nd Coppa Italia, the major Italian domestic cup. The competition was won by Sampdoria, who defeated Napoli 4–1 on aggregate in a two-legged final played at Stadio San Paolo (Napoli's home venue) and Stadio Giovanni Zini (neutral venue due to unavailability of Sampdoria's Stadio Luigi Ferraris home venue).

== First round ==
=== Group 1 ===
| Pos | Team | Pld | W | D | L | GF | GA | GD | Pts |
|---|---|---|---|---|---|---|---|---|---|
| 1 | Ascoli | 5 | 2 | 3 | 0 | 9 | 5 | +4 | 7 |
| 2 | Internazionale | 5 | 3 | 1 | 1 | 6 | 3 | +3 | 7 |
| 3 | Brescia | 5 | 2 | 2 | 1 | 7 | 6 | +1 | 6 |
| 4 | Parma | 5 | 1 | 3 | 1 | 7 | 7 | 0 | 5 |
| 5 | Reggina | 5 | 2 | 1 | 2 | 5 | 6 | −1 | 5 |
| 6 | Monopoli | 5 | 0 | 0 | 5 | 3 | 10 | −7 | 0 |

=== Group 2 ===
| Pos | Team | Pld | W | D | L | GF | GA | GD | Pts |
|---|---|---|---|---|---|---|---|---|---|
| 1 | Torino | 5 | 4 | 1 | 0 | 8 | 4 | +4 | 9 |
| 2 | Udinese | 5 | 3 | 0 | 2 | 10 | 4 | +6 | 6 |
| 3 | Cesena | 5 | 2 | 1 | 2 | 5 | 4 | +1 | 5 |
| 4 | Foggia | 5 | 2 | 0 | 3 | 5 | 7 | −2 | 4 |
| 5 | Catanzaro | 5 | 0 | 3 | 2 | 3 | 7 | −4 | 3 |
| 6 | Triestina | 5 | 1 | 1 | 3 | 3 | 8 | −5 | 3 |

=== Group 3 ===
| Pos | Team | Pld | W | D | L | GF | GA | GD | Pts |
|---|---|---|---|---|---|---|---|---|---|
| 1 | Milan | 5 | 4 | 1 | 0 | 10 | 4 | +6 | 9 |
| 2 | Pescara | 5 | 4 | 0 | 1 | 11 | 7 | +4 | 8 |
| 3 | Lazio | 5 | 3 | 0 | 2 | 11 | 7 | +4 | 6 |
| 4 | Messina | 5 | 1 | 1 | 3 | 12 | 13 | −1 | 3 |
| 5 | Campobasso | 5 | 1 | 0 | 4 | 5 | 10 | −5 | 2 |
| 6 | Licata | 5 | 1 | 0 | 4 | 5 | 13 | −8 | 2 |

=== Group 4 ===
| Pos | Team | Pld | W | D | L | GF | GA | GD | Pts |
|---|---|---|---|---|---|---|---|---|---|
| 1 | Juventus | 5 | 2 | 3 | 0 | 12 | 6 | +6 | 7 |
| 2 | Hellas Verona | 5 | 3 | 1 | 1 | 11 | 5 | +6 | 7 |
| 3 | Atalanta | 5 | 3 | 1 | 1 | 8 | 4 | +4 | 7 |
| 4 | Cosenza | 5 | 2 | 1 | 2 | 8 | 8 | 0 | 5 |
| 5 | Vicenza | 5 | 1 | 1 | 3 | 5 | 11 | −6 | 3 |
| 6 | Taranto | 5 | 0 | 1 | 4 | 2 | 12 | −10 | 1 |

=== Group 5 ===
| Pos | Team | Pld | W | D | L | GF | GA | GD | Pts |
|---|---|---|---|---|---|---|---|---|---|
| 1 | Roma | 5 | 4 | 0 | 1 | 14 | 7 | +7 | 8 |
| 2 | Monza | 5 | 3 | 2 | 0 | 7 | 3 | +4 | 8 |
| 3 | Como | 5 | 2 | 2 | 1 | 3 | 3 | 0 | 6 |
| 4 | Piacenza | 5 | 2 | 2 | 1 | 6 | 7 | −1 | 6 |
| 5 | Empoli | 5 | 1 | 0 | 4 | 6 | 7 | −1 | 2 |
| 6 | Prato | 5 | 0 | 0 | 5 | 3 | 12 | −9 | 0 |

=== Group 6 ===
| Pos | Team | Pld | W | D | L | GF | GA | GD | Pts |
|---|---|---|---|---|---|---|---|---|---|
| 1 | Pisa | 5 | 2 | 3 | 0 | 9 | 6 | +3 | 7 |
| 2 | Fiorentina | 5 | 3 | 1 | 1 | 7 | 4 | +3 | 7 |
| 3 | Ancona | 5 | 2 | 1 | 2 | 4 | 3 | +1 | 5 |
| 4 | Genoa | 5 | 1 | 3 | 1 | 4 | 4 | 0 | 5 |
| 5 | Virtus Bergamo | 5 | 1 | 2 | 2 | 5 | 8 | −3 | 4 |
| 6 | Avellino | 5 | 0 | 2 | 3 | 2 | 6 | −4 | 2 |

=== Group 7 ===
| Pos | Team | Pld | W | D | L | GF | GA | GD | Pts |
|---|---|---|---|---|---|---|---|---|---|
| 1 | Napoli | 5 | 4 | 0 | 1 | 9 | 3 | +6 | 8 |
| 2 | Bari | 5 | 3 | 2 | 0 | 7 | 2 | +5 | 8 |
| 3 | Sambenedettese | 5 | 2 | 2 | 1 | 5 | 4 | +1 | 6 |
| 4 | Bologna | 5 | 2 | 0 | 3 | 10 | 5 | +5 | 4 |
| 5 | Barletta | 5 | 0 | 3 | 2 | 3 | 10 | −7 | 3 |
| 6 | Spezia | 5 | 0 | 1 | 4 | 3 | 13 | −10 | 1 |

=== Group 8 ===
| Pos | Team | Pld | W | D | L | GF | GA | GD | Pts |
|---|---|---|---|---|---|---|---|---|---|
| 1 | Sampdoria | 5 | 4 | 1 | 0 | 14 | 2 | +12 | 9 |
| 2 | Lecce | 5 | 2 | 2 | 1 | 3 | 2 | +1 | 6 |
| 3 | Modena | 5 | 3 | 0 | 2 | 7 | 7 | 0 | 6 |
| 4 | Cremonese | 5 | 3 | 0 | 2 | 5 | 6 | −1 | 6 |
| 5 | Padova | 5 | 0 | 2 | 3 | 3 | 9 | −6 | 2 |
| 6 | Arezzo | 5 | 0 | 1 | 4 | 2 | 8 | −6 | 1 |

== Second round ==
=== Group 1 ===
| Pos | Team | Pld | W | D | L | GF | GA | GD | Pts |
|---|---|---|---|---|---|---|---|---|---|
| 1 | Hellas Verona | 3 | 2 | 1 | 0 | 10 | 1 | +9 | 5 |
| 2 | Milan | 3 | 1 | 1 | 1 | 4 | 2 | +2 | 3 |
| 3 | Torino | 3 | 1 | 1 | 1 | 2 | 5 | −3 | 3 |
| 4 | Sambenedettese | 3 | 0 | 1 | 2 | 1 | 9 | −8 | 1 |

=== Group 2 ===
| Pos | Team | Pld | W | D | L | GF | GA | GD | Pts |
|---|---|---|---|---|---|---|---|---|---|
| 1 | Napoli | 3 | 2 | 1 | 0 | 7 | 1 | +6 | 5 |
| 2 | Lecce | 3 | 1 | 2 | 0 | 5 | 3 | +2 | 4 |
| 3 | Cesena | 3 | 1 | 1 | 1 | 5 | 4 | +1 | 3 |
| 4 | Modena | 3 | 0 | 0 | 3 | 2 | 11 | −9 | 0 |

=== Group 3 ===
| Pos | Team | Pld | W | D | L | GF | GA | GD | Pts |
|---|---|---|---|---|---|---|---|---|---|
| 1 | Pisa | 3 | 1 | 2 | 0 | 6 | 4 | +2 | 4 |
| 2 | Ancona | 3 | 1 | 2 | 0 | 3 | 2 | +1 | 4 |
| 3 | Roma | 3 | 1 | 0 | 2 | 5 | 5 | 0 | 2 |
| 4 | Pescara | 3 | 0 | 2 | 1 | 4 | 7 | −3 | 2 |

=== Group 4 ===
| Pos | Team | Pld | W | D | L | GF | GA | GD | Pts |
|---|---|---|---|---|---|---|---|---|---|
| 1 | Sampdoria | 3 | 2 | 1 | 0 | 5 | 1 | +4 | 5 |
| 2 | Atalanta | 3 | 2 | 0 | 1 | 5 | 3 | +2 | 4 |
| 3 | Bari | 3 | 1 | 1 | 1 | 5 | 6 | −1 | 3 |
| 4 | Monza | 3 | 0 | 0 | 3 | 3 | 8 | −5 | 0 |

=== Group 5 ===
| Pos | Team | Pld | W | D | L | GF | GA | GD | Pts |
|---|---|---|---|---|---|---|---|---|---|
| 1 | Lazio | 3 | 2 | 1 | 0 | 3 | 1 | +2 | 5 |
| 2 | Fiorentina | 3 | 2 | 0 | 1 | 7 | 4 | +3 | 4 |
| 3 | Internazionale | 3 | 0 | 2 | 1 | 5 | 6 | −1 | 2 |
| 4 | Udinese | 3 | 0 | 1 | 2 | 1 | 5 | −4 | 1 |

Atalanta and Fiorentina admitted to the quarter-finals as best second.

=== Group 6 ===
| Pos | Team | Pld | W | D | L | GF | GA | GD | Pts |
|---|---|---|---|---|---|---|---|---|---|
| 1 | Ascoli | 3 | 1 | 2 | 0 | 3 | 1 | +2 | 4 |
| 2 | Como | 3 | 1 | 2 | 0 | 2 | 1 | +1 | 4 |
| 3 | Juventus | 3 | 1 | 1 | 1 | 2 | 2 | 0 | 3 |
| 4 | Brescia | 3 | 0 | 1 | 2 | 0 | 3 | −3 | 1 |

== Quarter-finals ==
| Team 1 | Agg. | Team 2 | 1st leg | 2nd leg |
|---|---|---|---|---|
| Atalanta | 4-3 | Lazio | 2-0 | 2-3 |
| Napoli | 4-3 | Ascoli | 3-0 | 1-3 |
| Sampdoria | 4-1 | Fiorentina | 3-0 | 1-1 |
| Hellas Verona | 2-2 (a) | Pisa | 2-1 | 0-1 |

== Semi-finals ==
| Team 1 | Agg. | Team 2 | 1st leg | 2nd leg |
|---|---|---|---|---|
| Atalanta | 3-6 | Sampdoria | 2-3 | 1-3 |
| Pisa | 0-3 | Napoli | 0-2 | 0-1 |

== Final ==
=== First leg ===
7 June 1989
21:00

| Napoli | 1–0 | Sampdoria |
|---|---|---|
| Renica 55' |

Stadio San Paolo, Naples
Attendance: 70,300
Referee: Tullio Lanese

=== Second leg ===
28 June 1989
21:00

| Sampdoria | 4–0 | Napoli |
|---|---|---|
| Vialli 32'; Cerezo 38'; Vierchowod 47'; Mancini 59' (pen.) |

Stadio Giovanni Zini, Cremona
Attendance: 34,400
Referee: Rosario Lo Bello

Sampdoria won 4–1 on aggregate.

== Top goalscorers ==
| Rank | Player | Club | Goals |
|---|---|---|---|
| 1 | (Italy) Gianluca Vialli | Sampdoria | 13 |
| 2 | (Italy) Roberto Baggio | Fiorentina | 9 |
| 3 | (Italy) Alessandro Altobelli | Juventus | 7 |
| 3 | (Brazil) Tita | Pescara | 7 |
| 3 | (Italy) Paolo Monelli | Bari | 7 |
| 3 | (Argentina) Diego Maradona | Napoli | 7 |
| 3 | (Italy) Antonio De Vitis | Udinese | 7 |
| 8 | (Italy) Pasquale Traini | Cesena | 6 |
| 8 | (Argentina) Gustavo Dezotti | Lazio | 6 |
| 10 | (Italy) Roberto Mancini | Sampdoria | 5 |
| 10 | (Italy) Pietro Vierchowod | Sampdoria | 5 |
| 10 | (Netherlands) Mario Been | Pisa | 5 |
| 10 | (Belgium) Francis Severeyns | Pisa | 5 |
| 10 | (Italy) Giacomo Modica | Messina | 5 |
