= Alemão (footballer, born 1961) =

Brazilian footballer and manager (born 1961)

Personal information
- Full name: Ricardo Rogério de Brito
- Date of birth: November 22, 1961 (age 64)
- Place of birth: Lavras, Brazil
- Height: 1.80 m (5 ft 11 in)
- Position: Defensive midfielder

Senior career*
Years	Team	Apps	(Gls)
1980	Fabril		
1981–1987	Botafogo	62	(7)
1987–1988	Atlético Madrid	35	(6)
1988–1992	Napoli	93	(9)
1992–1994	Atalanta	40	(2)
1994–1996	São Paulo	31	(1)
1996	Volta Redonda		

International career^{‡}
1983–1990	Brazil	39	(6)

Managerial career
- 2007: Tupynambás
- 2008: América-MG
- 2010: Nacional-AM
- 2011: Central
- 2017: Rio Negro
- * Club domestic league appearances and goals as of August 29, 2008 ‡ National team caps and goals as of August 29, 2008

Ricardo Rogério de Brito (born 22 November 1961), better known by his nickname Alemão, is a Brazilian former professional footballer who played as a defensive midfielder.

== Nickname ==
The nickname "Alemão" was attributed to his blond hair and fair complexion, which made him resemble the appearance commonly associated with German Brazilians.

== Playing career ==
=== Club ===
Born in Lavras, Minas Gerais, Alemão started his career playing for a Minas Gerais' club called Fabril in 1980. In 1981, he moved to Botafogo, of Rio de Janeiro, where he stayed until 1987, winning the Bola de Prata award of Placar Magazine in 1985. In 1987, and in 1988, he played for Atlético Madrid, of Spain, scoring six goals in 35 games, and won the EFE Trophy as best South American player and the La Liga Foreign Player of the Year in 1988. Between 1988, and 1992, he played 93 games and scored nine goals for Napoli of Italy, playing alongside star offensive players like Diego Maradona and Careca as a defensive foil. With Napoli, he won the UEFA Cup in 1989, scoring a goal in the final, followed by the Serie A title and the Supercoppa Italiana in 1990. In 1992, he signed with Atalanta of Italy, scoring two goals in 40 games, until he left the club in 1994. In 1994, he returned to Brazil, playing 77 games and scoring two goals for São Paulo, winning two international titles with the club in 1994, the Copa CONMEBOL, and the Recopa Sudamericana; he remained with the club until 1996, when he moved to Volta Redonda and retired from football.

=== International ===
Alemão was capped 39 times for the Brazil national football team, between June 1983, and June 1990, scoring six goals, and he was part of the national team squad for the 1986 FIFA World Cup and the 1990 FIFA World Cup. He was also part of the Brazilian team that won the 1989 Copa América. He played his last game for the Brazil national team on June 24, 1990, when his team was defeated by Argentina in the second round of the 1990 FIFA World Cup.

== Style of play ==
'A tenacious and physical yet technical player, Alemão was a strong, consistent, hard-working, and versatile midfielder, who excelled in a holding role as either a defensive midfielder or deep-lying playmaker. His tactical intelligence, energy, tackling, and his ability to read the game, helped him initiate offensive plays after winning back possession.'

== Managerial career ==
Alemão started his managerial career in 2007, at Tupynambás, then in 2008, he was hired as manager of América Mineiro, which was, on that season, on second division of the Minas Gerais State League, but was promoted to the first level under his management.

== Honours ==
Napoli

- Serie A: 1989–90
- Supercoppa Italiana: 1990
- UEFA Cup: 1988–89

São Paulo

- Recopa Sudamericana: 1994
- Copa CONMEBOL: 1994

Brazil

- Copa América: 1989

Individual

- Bola de Prata: 1985
- EFE Trophy for Best South American Player of the Year: 1988
- La Liga Foreign Player of the Year: 1988
