= Giancarlo Corradini =

Italian footballer (born 1961)

Personal information
- Date of birth: 24 February 1961 (age 65)
- Place of birth: Sassuolo, Italy
- Height: 1.82 m (6 ft 0 in)
- Position: Centre-back

Senior career*
Years	Team	Apps	(Gls)
1977–1978	Sassuolo	21	(0)
1978–1980	Genoa	14	(0)
1980–1982	Reggiana	66	(2)
1982–1988	Torino	146	(6)
1988–1994	Napoli	173	(2)

Managerial career
- 1998–1999: Modena (youth)
- 1999–2001: Juventus (youth)
- 2001–2004: Juventus (fitness coach)
- 2004–2007: Juventus (assistant)
- 2007: Juventus (caretaker)
- 2007: Venezia
- 2008–2009: Cuneo
- 2012–2013: Watford (assistant)
- 2016: Reggiana (technical director)
- 2017: Castelvetro Calcio
- * Club domestic league appearances and goals

Giancarlo Corradini (Italian pronunciation: [dʒaŋˈkarlo korraˈdiːni]; born 24 February 1961) is an Italian football manager and former player. He played as a centre-back.

== Playing career ==
Corradini was born in Sassuolo, Province of Modena. He started his career in his native Sassuolo, before moving to Genoa in 1978 and Reggiana in 1980. From 1982 to 1988 he then played for Torino. In 1988, he left Torino to join Napoli, where he won a Serie A championship title in 1990, a UEFA Cup in 1989 and an Italian Super Cup in 1990. He retired from playing football in 1994.

== Coaching career ==
Following his retirement from playing football, Corradini became a youth team coach. He joined Juventus in 1999; in 2001, following the appointment of Marcello Lippi, he entered into the first team coaching staff, and in 2004 he was finally appointed as Fabio Capello's first assistant coach. Following the departure of Capello, he was confirmed beside new head coach Didier Deschamps for the Serie B debut season for the club. In May 2007, following disputes between Deschamps and the club management that convinced the Frenchman to resign from his post, Corradini was appointed caretaker coach of Juventus for the two final matches of the season, with Juventus already crowned as Serie B champions. In his first press conference, he introduced himself as a "little Mourinho" because he worked for and learnt from several top-rated football managers.

In his tenure as Juventus caretaker, Corradini did not achieve a single point, with Juventus losing to relegation-battling sides Bari and Spezia. The day before the final match, lost 3–2 at home to Spezia, he announced he was going to leave Juventus, citing his intention to find a full-time head coaching position. On 24 June 2007, he was successively announced as new head coach of Serie C1 club Venezia. He was sacked two months later on 30 August, after a 2–1 away loss to Cremonese in the second Serie C1 league matchday.

In November 2008, Corradini accepted to fill the vacant head coaching post at Serie D club Cuneo, which led to escape relegation at the end of the 2008–09 season. He left Cuneo in June 2009. In July 2012, Corradini was appointed assistant coach at Watford under their new manager Gianfranco Zola. He left in July 2013.
