= Maurizio Neri =

Italian footballer and coach

Personal information
- Date of birth: 21 March 1965 (age 61)
- Place of birth: Rimini, Italy
- Height: 1.82 m (5 ft 11 1/2 in)
- Position: Striker

Team information
- Current team: Sassuolo U17 coach

Senior career*
Years	Team	Apps	(Gls)
1984–1985	Bellaria Igea	29	(4)
1985–1987	Fano	58	(6)
1987–1988	Reggiana	34	(6)
1988	Ancona	7	(2)
1988–1989	Napoli	14	(2)
1989–1991	Pisa	64	(8)
1991–1993	Lazio	18	(0)
1993–1998	Brescia	169	(55)
1998–1999	Reggiana	24	(4)
1999–2002	Rimini	69	(26)
2002–2003	Forlì	13	(1)
2003–2004	Mirandolese		
2004–2005	Terme Monticelli		

Managerial career
- 2005–2008: Terme Monticelli
- 2008–2009: Bellaria Igea
- 2010: Real Rimini
- 2011–201?: Real Rimini
- * Club domestic league appearances and goals

Maurizio Neri (born 21 March 1965 in Rimini) is an Italian professional football coach and former player who played as a striker.

Already on the staff of Sassuolo, he was appointed under-17s coach in July 2023.

== Honours ==
Napoli

- UEFA Cup winner: 1988–89
