= Luca Fusi =

Italian footballer and manager

Personal information
- Date of birth: 7 June 1963 (age 63)
- Place of birth: Lecco, Italy
- Height: 1.75 m (5 ft 9 in)
- Positions: Midfielder; defender

Team information
- Current team: Castel Rigone

Youth career
- Como

Senior career*
Years	Team	Apps	(Gls)
1981–1986	Como	125	(5)
1986–1988	Sampdoria	60	(0)
1988–1990	Napoli	60	(2)
1990–1994	Torino	119	(1)
1994–1995	Juventus	10	(0)
1995–1997	Lugano	20	(0)
Total		394	(8)

International career
1988–1992	Italy	8	(0)

Managerial career
- 2007–2008: Bellaria Igea
- 2008–2009: Real Marcianise
- 2009–2010: Foligno
- 2013–: Castel Rigone
- * Club domestic league appearances and goals

Luca Fusi (Italian pronunciation: [ˈluːka ˈfuːzi; ˈfuːsi]; born 7 June 1963) is an Italian former professional footballer turned manager, who played as a midfielder or defender. He is the current head coach of Lega Pro Seconda Divisione team Castel Rigone.

During his club career he played for Como, Sampdoria, Napoli, Torino and Juventus. He earned 8 caps for the Italy national football team and took part in the 1988 UEFA European Football Championship. He was known as an intelligent, hardworking, tactically versatile, and correct player throughout his career, with good technique and determination, and could also play as a sweeper, a role in which he was frequently deployed in his later career, following his athletic decline, due to his playmaking ability.

== Club career ==
Fusi began his career with Como, then playing for Sampdoria from 1986 to 1988, and also winning a Coppa Italia with the Genoan side.

In 1988, he left Sampdoria to join Napoli, winning a UEFA Cup in 1989 and a Serie A championship type in 1990. In June 1990, he successively left Napoli to become part of the Torino midfield. Ironically for him, he scored his only Serie A goal for Torino away to Napoli on 16 February 1992, a left-footed strike from outside the area. Having won another Coppa Italia title in 1993, also reaching the 1992 UEFA Cup final, he moved to crosstown rivals Juventus, where he won another Serie A title and a personal third Coppa Italia in 1995, although he began to be deployed less frequently when Lippi switched to a zonal marking defensive system, which did not feature a sweeper, and collected only 10 appearances in the league in total, and 18 in all competitions throughout the season. He ended his career with Swiss side AC Lugano, where he played from 1996 to 1997.

== International career ==
Fusi made his Italy national team debut on 31 March 1988 in Split, against Yugoslavia, as a substitute for Luigi De Agostini. He was also called up for Italy at the UEFA Euro 1988 under manager Azeglio Vicini, but did not play in any of Italy's matches during the tournament as the team reached the semi-finals. In total, Fusi made 8 appearances for Italy between 1988 and 1992.

== Coaching career ==
After two seasons as assistant coach at Cesena, in 2007–08 season, Fusi served as head coach of Bellaria Igea of Serie C2 (fourth tier).

In June 2008, he signed for Real Marcianise of Lega Pro Prima Divisione (third tier), guiding them to a mid-table finish. He is currently serving as head coach of Foligno, another Lega Pro Prima Divisione team, for the 2009–10 season. He was removed from his managerial duties on 27 April 2010 due to poor results, with Foligno in 15th place, and replaced by Salvatore Matrecano.

On 23 October 2013, Fusi became coach of Castel Rigone.

== Honours ==
=== Club ===
Sampdoria

- Coppa Italia: 1987–88

Napoli

- Serie A: 1989–90
- UEFA Cup: 1988–89

Torino

- Mitropa Cup: 1991
- UEFA Cup: runner up 1991–92
- Coppa Italia: 1992–93

Juventus

- Serie A: 1994–95
- Coppa Italia: 1994–95
- Supercoppa Italiana: 1995
- UEFA Champions League: 1995–96

Individual

- Torino FC Hall of Fame: 2023
