= Tullio Lanese =

Italian football referee (1947–2025)

- Born: 10 January 1947; Messina, Italy
- Died: 1 March 2025 (aged 78); Messina, Italy
- Other occupation: Policeman

Domestic
Years	League	Role
1982–1992	Serie A	Referee

International
Years	League	Role
1985–1992	FIFA-listed	Referee

Tullio Lanese (10 January 1947 – 1 March 2025) was an Italian football referee and a president of the Italian Referees Association, the AIA.

== Referee ==
From 1987 to 1992, Lanese held the qualification of international FIFA referee, officiating in a total of 38 matches, including three matches of the final phase of the 1990 World Cup in Italy: Brazil-Sweden 2–1 in Turin, Uruguay-South Korea 1–0 in Udine, and the last 16 encounter Cameroon-Colombia (2–1 after extra time) in Naples. He also refereed the European Cup final in 1991, and the semi-final between Sweden and Germany at the 1992 European Championships. Domestically, he officiated the 1991 Supercoppa Italiana between Sampdoria and Roma, and two Coppa Italia final matches: the first leg of the 1986 edition of the final (Roma–Sampdoria), and the second leg of the 1989 edition of the final (Napoli–Sampdoria). In total, he officiated 159 Serie A matches in Italy.

== The Calciopoli scandal ==
As a result of the 2006 Italian football scandal, Lanese resigned as president of the AIA; at the end of the legal process he was sentenced by the Federal Court to prohibition for two years and six months, the sentence was reduced by the Chamber of Conciliation and Arbitration of CONI to one year, being replaced by Luigi Agnolin, as Extraordinary Commissioner.

The Naples prosecutor asked for the indictment of Lanese under the charge of criminal association aimed at sports fraud, and the trial was concluded at first instance with a sentence of two years of imprisonment.

On 5 December 2012, the fourth section of the Court of Appeal of Naples overturned the sentence of first instance acquitting him.

On 17 October 2012, the Court of Auditors sentenced Lanese, together with the referees involved in the scandal, to compensate the Italian Football Federation on charges of damage to their image. The former referee would have to pay €500,000.

On 24 March 2015, the prosecution's appeal against the plaintiff's acquittal was declared inadmissible in the Supreme Court.

== Outside of football ==
In 2008 he was nominated by the UDC for the regional elections in Sicily, but was not elected.

On 1 March 2025, Tullio died in Messina at the age of 78.

== Major matches refereed ==
Date	Match	Tournament	Venue	Result	Ref
29 May 1991	Red Star Belgrade vs. Marseille	1991 European Cup final	Stadio San Nicola, Bari	0–0 a.e.t (5–3 on penalties)	
