= 1989–90 Serie A =

88th season of top-tier Italian football

Serie A
- Season: 1989–90
- Dates: 27 August 1989 – 29 April 1990
- Champions: Napoli; 2nd title
- Relegated: Udinese; Hellas Verona; Cremonese; Ascoli
- European Cup: Napoli; Milan
- Cup Winners' Cup: Juventus; Sampdoria
- UEFA Cup: Internazionale; Roma; Atalanta; Bologna
- Matches: 306
- Goals: 684 (2.24 per match)
- Top goalscorer: Marco van Basten (19 goals)
- Longest winning run: 22 matches Milan
- Longest unbeaten run: 17 matches Milan
- Longest winless run: 4 matches Ascoli
- Longest losing run: 17 matches Ascoli

Serie A 1989-90 team distribution

The 1989–90 Serie A season was another successful year for Napoli, with Diego Maradona being among the leading goalscorers in Serie A (16 goals), behind Marco van Basten of Milan (19 goals) and Roberto Baggio of Fiorentina (17 goals). But while Baggio's Fiorentina narrowly avoided relegation, Maradona's Napoli won their second Serie A title in four seasons, while Van Basten helped Milan retain the European Cup as compensation for their failure to win the Serie A title, having finished two points behind Napoli. Demoted to Serie B for 1990–91 were Udinese, Hellas Verona, Cremonese and Ascoli. In Europe, Sampdoria won the Cup Winners Cup and Juventus the UEFA Cup, making this year the most successful in Italian football history.

== Teams ==
Genoa, Bari, Udinese and Cremonese had been promoted from Serie B.

== Personnel and sponsoring ==
Team	Head coach	Kit manufacturer	Shirt sponsor
Ascoli	(Italy) Aldo Agroppi	Adidas	Cocif
Atalanta	(Italy) Emiliano Mondonico	Ennerre	Tamoil
Bari	(Italy) Gaetano Salvemini	Adidas	Sud Leasing
Bologna	(Italy) Luigi Maifredi	Uhlsport	Mercatone Uno
Cesena	(Italy) Marcello Lippi	Adidas	Orogel
Cremonese	(Italy) Tarcisio Burgnich	Patrick	Majestic SpA
Fiorentina	(Italy) Francesco Graziani	ABM	La Nazione
Genoa	(Italy) Franco Scoglio	Erreà	Mita
Hellas Verona	(Italy) Osvaldo Bagnoli	Hummel	Tortellini Rana
Internazionale	(Italy) Giovanni Trapattoni	Uhlsport	Misura
Juventus	(Italy) Dino Zoff	Kappa	UPIM
Lazio	(Italy) Giuseppe Materazzi	Umbro	Cassa di Risparmio di Roma
Lecce	(Italy) Carlo Mazzone	Adidas	Ponti Aceto
Milan	(Italy) Arrigo Sacchi	Kappa	Mediolanum
Napoli	(Italy) Alberto Bigon	Ennerre	Mars
Roma	(Italy) Luigi Radice	Ennerre	Barilla
Sampdoria	(Socialist Federal Republic of Yugoslavia) Vujadin Boškov	Kappa	Erg
Udinese	(Italy) Rino Marchesi	ABM	Rex Elettrodomestici

== Final classification ==
Pos	Team	Pld	W	D	L	GF	GA	GD	Pts	Qualification or relegation
1	Napoli (C)	34	21	9	4	57	31	+26	51	Qualification to European Cup
2	Milan (Note: Milan qualified for the 1990–91 European Cup as defending champions.)	34	22	5	7	56	27	+29	49	Qualification to European Cup
3	Internazionale	34	17	10	7	55	32	+23	44	Qualification to UEFA Cup
4	Juventus	34	15	14	5	56	36	+20	44	Qualification to Cup Winners' Cup
5	Sampdoria (Note: Sampdoria qualified for the 1990–91 European Cup Winners' Cup as defending champions.)	34	16	11	7	46	26	+20	43	Qualification to Cup Winners' Cup
6	Roma	34	14	13	7	45	40	+5	41	Qualification to UEFA Cup
7	Atalanta	34	12	11	11	36	43	−7	35	Qualification to UEFA Cup
8	Bologna	34	9	16	9	29	36	−7	34	Qualification to UEFA Cup
9	Lazio	34	8	15	11	34	33	+1	31	
10	Bari	34	6	19	9	34	37	−3	31	
11	Genoa	34	6	17	11	27	31	−4	29	
12	Fiorentina	34	7	14	13	41	42	−1	28	
13	Cesena	34	6	16	12	26	36	−10	28	
14	Lecce	34	10	8	16	29	46	−17	28	
15	Udinese (R)	34	6	15	13	37	51	−14	27	Relegation to Serie B
16	Hellas Verona (R)	34	6	13	15	27	44	−17	25	Relegation to Serie B
17	Cremonese (R)	34	5	13	16	29	50	−21	23	Relegation to Serie B
18	Ascoli (R)	34	4	13	17	20	43	−23	21	Relegation to Serie B

Source: 1989–90 Serie A, RSSSF.com
Rules for classification: 1) Points; 2) Head-to-head points; 3) Head-to-head goal difference; 4) Goal difference; 5) Goals scored; 6) Draw.
(C) Champions; (R) Relegated

== Results ==
Home \ Away	ASC	ATA	BAR	BOL	CES	CRE	FIO	GEN	INT	JUV	LAZ	LEC	MIL	NAP	ROM	SAM	UDI	VER
Ascoli	—	1–1	1–1	1–1	0–0	0–1	2–1	0–0	0–1	1–2	0–0	0–2	1–0	0–1	1–1	2–1	1–0	1–1
Atalanta	1–0	—	0–0	0–0	1–0	2–0	0–0	1–0	2–1	1–2	4–0	2–1	0–1	0–2	3–0	2–2	1–0	1–0
Bari	2–2	4–0	—	0–0	2–0	2–0	1–1	0–0	0–0	1–1	0–0	0–1	0–1	1–1	1–2	0–2	3–1	2–1
Bologna	2–1	0–0	3–1	—	1–0	1–1	1–0	1–0	2–2	1–1	1–1	2–1	0–0	2–4	1–1	1–0	0–0	1–0
Cesena	1–0	0–0	2–2	0–0	—	1–1	1–1	1–1	2–3	1–1	0–0	4–0	0–3	0–0	0–0	1–2	1–1	1–0
Cremonese	2–1	1–1	0–2	2–1	1–2	—	1–2	0–1	0–1	2–2	2–1	1–1	1–0	1–1	0–1	0–3	2–2	1–1
Fiorentina	5–1	4–1	2–2	0–1	0–0	0–0	—	0–0	2–2	2–2	1–0	3–0	2–3	0–1	1–2	3–1	1–2	3–1
Genoa	2–0	2–2	0–0	0–0	2–3	1–0	1–1	—	0–0	2–3	2–2	1–0	1–1	1–1	0–2	1–2	0–0	0–1
Internazionale	0–0	7–2	1–1	3–0	1–1	2–1	2–0	1–0	—	2–1	3–0	2–1	0–3	3–1	3–0	2–0	2–0	0–0
Juventus	3–1	0–1	1–0	1–1	1–1	4–0	3–1	1–1	1–0	—	1–0	3–0	3–0	1–1	1–1	1–0	1–1	2–1
Lazio	3–0	1–2	2–2	3–0	4–0	1–1	1–1	0–0	2–1	1–1	—	3–0	1–3	3–0	0–1	0–2	0–0	0–0
Lecce	1–1	2–1	1–1	1–0	2–1	2–1	1–0	2–1	0–0	2–3	0–0	—	1–2	1–1	0–2	0–0	1–0	1–0
Milan	2–1	3–1	4–0 (Note: The match was played at Stadio Atleti Azzurri d'Italia.)	1–0	3–0	2–1	1–1	1–0	1–3	3–2	0–1	2–0	—	3–0	1–0	1–0	3–1	0–0
Napoli	1–0	3–1	3–0	2–0	1–0	3–0	3–2	2–1	2–0	3–1	1–0	3–2	3–0	—	3–1	1–1	1–0	2–0
Roma	0–0	4–1	1–0	2–2	1–0	3–2	0–0	0–1	1–1	1–0	1–1	2–1	0–4	1–1	—	1–1	3–1	5–2
Sampdoria	2–0	1–0	0–0	3–0	0–0	1–1	3–0	0–0	2–0	0–0	2–0	1–0	1–1	2–1	4–2	—	3–1	1–0
Udinese	2–0	0–0	2–2	1–1	1–0	1–1	1–1	2–4	4–3	2–2	0–2	3–1	0–2	2–2	1–1	3–3	—	2–1
Hellas Verona	0–0	1–1	1–1	3–2	0–2	1–1	1–0	1–1	0–3	1–4	1–1	0–0	2–1	1–2	2–2	1–0	2–0	—

Legend: Blue = home team win; Yellow = draw; Red = away team win.

== Top goalscorers ==
Rank	Player	Club	Goals
1	(Netherlands) Marco van Basten	Milan	19
2	(Italy) Roberto Baggio	Fiorentina	17
3	(Argentina) Diego Maradona	Napoli	16
4	(Italy) Salvatore Schillaci	Juventus	15
5	(Germany) Rudi Völler	Roma	14
6	(Italy) Massimo Agostini	Cesena	13
6	(Argentina) Gustavo Dezotti	Cremonese	13
6	(Germany) Jürgen Klinsmann	Internazionale	13
9	(Argentina) Abel Balbo	Udinese	11
9	(Italy) Roberto Mancini	Sampdoria	11
9	(Germany) Lothar Matthäus	Internazionale	11

== Season tickets ==
The season ticket sales as they were before the beginning of the season (Milan had the best record of sales):

Source: Statistiche Spettatori Serie A 1989-1990

Rank	Club	Tickets
1	Milan	41,570
2	Napoli	38,346
3	Inter	32.920
4	Sampdoria	16.535
5	Genoa	14.800
6	Udinese	13.905
7	Juventus	12.780
8	Bologna	12.620
9	Bari	10.855
10	Roma	10.071
11	Fiorentina	9.018
12	Verona	8.967
13	Atalanta	8.800
14	Lazio	8.716
15	Cesena	4.943
16	Lecce	4.922
17	Ascoli	4.814
18	Cremonese	3.712

== Attendances ==
No.	Club	Average Attendance	Change (%)
1	AC Milan	59,054	-18.3%
2	SSC Napoli	58,264	-5.7%
3	Internazionale	50,142	-13.8%
4	Juventus FC	29,627	-2.4%
5	Genoa CFC	26,789	54.9%
6	Bologna FC	26,391	16.7%
7	UC Sampdoria	26,120	45.4%
8	AS Bari	24,807	42.8%
9	Udinese Calcio	23,472	5.7%
10	AS Roma	22,067	-36.8%
11	Atalanta BC	21,966	-11.1%
12	Hellas Verona	21,429	-15.1%
13	US Lecce	20,816	-8.3%
14	SS Lazio	20,022	-37.7%
15	ACF Fiorentina	17,306	-29.5%
16	AC Cesena	16,583	-4.3%
17	US Cremonese	12,154	53.1%
18	Ascoli Picchio	11,392	-6.7%

== References and sources ==
- Almanacco Illustrato del Calcio - La Storia 1898-2004, Panini Edizioni, Modena, September 2005
