= 2023–24 Calcio Padova season =

Calcio Padova
2023–24 season
- Manager: Vincenzo Torrente
- Stadium: Stadio Euganeo
- Serie C: 2nd
- Coppa Italia Serie C: Final
- Top goalscorer: League: Michael Liguori (11); All: Michael Liguori (11)

The 2023–24 season is Calcio Padova's 114th season in existence and third consecutive season in the Serie C. They are also competing in the Coppa Italia Serie C.

== Players ==
=== First-team squad ===
As of 1 September 2023.

Note: Flags indicate national team as defined under FIFA eligibility rules; some limited exceptions apply. Players may hold more than one non-FIFA nationality.

No.	Pos.	Nation	Player
1	GK	ITA	Antonio Donnarumma
2	DF	ITA	Filippo Delli Carri
3	DF	ITA	Marco Perrotta
4	DF	ITA	Francesco Belli
5	DF	ITA	Giovanni Leoni
6	MF	ITA	Jacopo Bacci
7	MF	ECU	Kevin Varas
8	MF	ITA	Pietro Fusi
9	FW	ITA	Michael De Marchi
10	MF	ITA	Igor Radrezza
11	MF	ITA	Jacopo Dezi
12	GK	ITA	Riccardo Rossi
13	DF	ITA	Luca Crescenzi
14	DF	ITA	Luca Villa

No.	Pos.	Nation	Player
15	MF	ITA	Nicolò Bianchi
17	MF	ITA	Alessandro Capelli
19	FW	ITA	Simone Palombi
20	FW	ITA	Mattia Bortolussi
21	FW	ITA	Michael Liguori
22	GK	ITA	Pablo Mangiaracina
25	DF	ITA	Bernardo Calabrese
26	DF	NZL	Niko Kirwan
30	DF	ITA	Giulio Favale
58	MF	ITA	Carmine Cretella
77	FW	ITA	Simone Russini
96	DF	ITA	Antonio Granata
99	GK	ITA	Alessandro Zanellati

=== Out on loan ===
Note: Flags indicate national team as defined under FIFA eligibility rules; some limited exceptions apply. Players may hold more than one non-FIFA nationality.

No.	Pos.	Nation	Player
—	GK	ITA	Mattia Fortin (at Legnago until 30 June 2024)
—	MF	ITA	Simone Franchini (at Pescara until 30 June 2024)

No.	Pos.	Nation	Player
—	FW	ITA	Luca Gagliano (at Potenza until 30 June 2024)
—	FW	ITA	Tommaso Ghirardello (at Genoa U19 until 30 June 2024)

== Transfers ==
=== In ===
Pos.	Player	Transferred from	Fee	Date	Source

=== Out ===
Pos.	Player	Transferred to	Fee	Date	Source

== Pre-season and friendlies ==
Win Draw Loss Fixtures

26 July 2023 Friendly	Lecce (Italy)	4–0	(Italy) Padova	Folgaria
17:00 CEST (UTC+2)	Rafia 3'; Banda 9'; Strefezza 17'; Corfitzen 84'			Stadium: Centro Sportivo Folgaria; Referee: Marco Piccinni

28 July 2023 Friendly	Padova (Italy)	1–0	(Italy) Torres
17:00 CEST (UTC+2)

2 August 2023 Friendly	Brescia (Italy)	1–1	(Italy) Padova
17:30 CEST (UTC+2)

5 August 2023 Friendly	Mestre (Italy)	1–2	(Italy) Padova
18:00 CEST (UTC+2)

13 August 2023 Friendly	Padova (Italy)	1–3	(Italy) Campodarsego
18:00 CEST (UTC+2)

25 March 2024 Friendly	Udinese (Italy)	2–3	(Italy) Padova
15:00 UTC+1

== Competitions ==
=== Overall record ===
Competition	First match	Last match	Starting round	Record							
Competition	First match	Last match	Starting round	Pld	W	D	L	GF	GA	GD	Win %
Serie C	4 September 2023	28 April 2024	Matchday 1	33	18	12	3	46	23	+23	54.55
Coppa Italia Serie C	3 October 2023		First round	7	6	0	1	14	4	+10	85.71
Total				40	24	12	4	60	27	+33	60.00

Last updated: 24 March 2024
Source: Soccerway

=== Serie C ===
==== League table ====
Pos	Team	Pld	W	D	L	GF	GA	GD	Pts	Qualification
1	Mantova (P)	38	24	8	6	72	31	+41	80	Promotion to Serie B and Supercoppa di Serie C
2	Padova	38	21	14	3	55	28	+27	77	National play-offs 2nd round
3	Vicenza	38	20	11	7	52	30	+22	71	National play-offs 1st round
4	Triestina	38	19	7	12	61	44	+17	64	Group play-offs 2nd round
5	Atalanta U23	38	16	11	11	43	36	+7	59	Group play-offs 1st round

Updated to match(es) played on 28 April 2024. Source: Lega Pro, Soccerway (in English)
Rules for classification: 1) Points; 2) Head-to-head points; 3) Head-to-head goal difference; 4) Goal difference; 5) Goals scored; 6) Lower goals against; 7) Wins; 8) Lower losses; 9) Away wins; 10) Lower home losses.
(Note: Head-to-head record is used only after all the matches between the teams in question have been played)
(P) Promoted

==== Results summary ====
Overall								Home						Away					
Pld	W	D	L	GF	GA	GD	Pts	W	D	L	GF	GA	GD	W	D	L	GF	GA	GD
33	18	12	3	46	23	+23	66	9	6	1	25	12	+13	9	6	2	21	11	+10

Last updated: 24 March 2024.
Source: Worldfootball

==== Results by round ====
Round	1	2	3	4	5	6	7	8	9	10	11
Ground	A	H	A	H	H	A	H	A	A	H	A
Result	D	W	W	W	W	W	D	D	W	D	
Position	8	4	5	3	2	1	1				

Updated to match(es) played on 24 October 2023. Source: Worldfootball
A = Away; H = Home; W = Win; D = Draw; L = Loss

==== Matches ====
The league fixtures were unveiled on 7 August 2023.

24 October 2023	Padova	0–0	Renate
20:45 CET (UTC+1)

29 October 2023	Vicenza	1–1	Padova
14:00 CET (UTC+1)

4 November 2023	Padova	3–1	Giana Erminio
18:30 CET (UTC+1)

11 November 2023	AlbinoLeffe	0–1	Padova
20:45 CET (UTC+1)

19 November 2023	Padova	3–2	Pro Vercelli
14:00 CET (UTC+1)

27 November 2023	Pergolettese	1–1	Padova
20:45 CET (UTC+1)

3 December 2023	Padova	1–1	Lumezzane
18:30 CET (UTC+1)

=== Coppa Italia Serie C ===
3 October 2023 First round	Legnago Salus	2–4	Padova	Legnago
18:30 CET (UTC+1)				Stadium: Stadio Mario Sandrini; Referee: Andrea Ancora

7 November 2023 Second round	Padova	3–0	Giana Erminio	Padua
18:30 CET (UTC+1)				Stadium: Stadio Euganeo

30 November 2023 Round of 16	Padova	2–0	Lumezzane	Padua
18:00 CET (UTC+1)				Stadium: Stadio Euganeo

12 December 2023 Quarter-finals	Pontedera	0–1	Padova	Pontedera
18:00 CET (UTC+1)				Stadium: Stadio Ettore Mannucci

24 January 2024 Semi-final; First leg	Lucchese	1–0	Padova	Lucca
18:30 CET (UTC+1)

28 February 2024 Semi-final; Second leg	Padova	2–0 (2–1 agg.)	Lucchese	Padua
19:00 CET (UTC+1)				Stadium: Stadio Euganeo

19 March 2024 Final; First leg	Padova	2–1	Catania	Padua
20:00 CET (UTC+1)				Stadium: Stadio Euganeo

2 April 2024 Final; Second leg	Catania	v (– agg.)	Padova	Catania
20:30 CEST (UTC+2)
