= 2002–03 Serie B =

Italian football league season

Serie B TIM
- Season: 2002–03
- Promoted: Siena (1st title); Sampdoria; Lecce; Ancona
- Relegated: Cosenza (bankruptcy)
- Matches: 380
- Goals: 961 (2.53 per match)
- Top goalscorer: (Italy) Igor Protti (23 goals)
- Longest winning run: Vicenza; 7 matches
- Longest unbeaten run: Vicenza; 14 matches

Serie B 2002-03 team distribution

The 2002–03 Serie B was the 71st season since its establishment in 1929. It is the second highest football league in Italy.

== Teams ==
Livorno, Ascoli, Triestina and Catania had been promoted from Serie C, while Hellas Verona, Lecce, and Venezia had been relegated from Serie A and Fiorentina had lost their national professional licence.

=== Personnel and sponsoring ===
Team	Manager	Kit manufacturer	Shirt sponsor
Ancona	(Italy) Luigi Simoni	Devis	Banca Marche
Ascoli	(Italy) Giuseppe Pillon	Uhlsport	Carisap
Bari	(Italy) Marco Tardelli	Lotto	asbari.com
Cagliari	(Italy) Gian Piero Ventura	A-Line	Terra Sarda
Catania	(Italy) Vincenzo Guerini	Galex	SP Energia Siciliana
Cosenza	(Italy) Antonio Sala	Sport Point	Provincia di Cosenza
Genoa	(Italy) Rino Lavezzini and (Italy) Vincenzo Torrente	Erreà	Costa Cruises
Hellas Verona	(Italy) Alberto Malesani	Lotto	Clerman
Lecce	(Italy) Delio Rossi	Asics	Salento d'amare
Livorno	(Italy) Roberto Donadoni	Asics	CR Livorno
Messina	(Italy) Bruno Bolchi	Asics	Jonax Group
Napoli	(Italy) Franco Colomba	Diadora	Peroni
Palermo	(Italy) Nedo Sonetti	Lotto	Provincia di Palermo
Salernitana	(Italy) Franco Varrella	Garman	Zip Jeans & Casual
Sampdoria	(Italy) Walter Novellino	Asics	Erg
Siena	(Italy) Giuseppe Papadopulo	Lotto	Monte Paschi Vita
Ternana	(Italy) Mario Beretta	Erreà	None
Triestina	(Italy) Ezio Rossi	Asics	Acegas
Venezia	(Italy) Gianfranco Bellotto	Sportika	Emmezeta
Vicenza	(Italy) Andrea Mandorlini	Biemme	Caffè Vero

== Final classification ==
In June 2003, Catania was at the centre of a controversy that led to the enlargement of Serie B from 20 to 24 teams, known as Caso Catania. The club claimed that Siena fielded an ineligible player in a 1–1 tie, a result which saw Catania relegated, whereas the two extra points from a victory would have kept them safe. They were awarded a 2–0 victory before the result was reverted because the guilty player was a substitute which did not play the match, then Catania appealed to the judges of the Autonomous Region of Sicily who re-awarded the victory again. In August, the FIGC decided to let Catania, along with Genoa and Salernitana, stay in Serie B; the newly reborn Fiorentina were also added for the 2003–04 season. The ruling led to protests and boycotts by the other Serie B clubs that delayed the start of the season, until the intervention of the Italian government.

Pos	Team	Pld	W	D	L	GF	GA	GD	Pts	Promotion or relegation
1	Siena (P, C)	38	17	16	5	46	26	+20	67	Promotion to Serie A
2	Sampdoria (P)	38	17	16	5	53	31	+22	67	Promotion to Serie A
3	Lecce (P)	38	15	18	5	46	33	+13	63	Promotion to Serie A
4	Ancona (P)	38	16	13	9	53	40	+13	61	Promotion to Serie A
5	Triestina	38	16	10	12	54	46	+8	58	
6	Palermo	38	15	13	10	45	42	+3	58	
7	Ternana	38	14	13	11	45	37	+8	55	
8	Cagliari	38	14	12	12	47	46	+1	54	
9	Vicenza	38	13	15	10	55	50	+5	54	
10	Livorno	38	12	13	13	48	43	+5	49	
11	Bari	38	10	19	9	38	37	+1	49	
12	Venezia	38	12	12	14	41	47	−6	48	
13	Ascoli	38	13	9	16	46	52	−6	48	
14	Hellas Verona	38	10	16	12	42	42	0	46	
15	Messina	38	10	16	12	51	54	−3	46	
16	Napoli	38	10	15	13	42	49	−7	45	
17	Catania (T)	38	12	7	19	45	60	−15	43	Readmitted (Note: Relegated and later readmitted to Serie B after Caso Catania.)
18	Genoa (T)	38	9	12	17	47	51	−4	39	Readmitted
19	Cosenza (R, E, R)	38	10	6	22	29	52	−23	36	Relegation to Serie D (Note: Lost professional licence for bankruptcy and joined 2003–04 Serie D with a new club.)
20	Salernitana (T)	38	4	11	23	28	63	−35	23	Readmitted

Source: Almanacco Illustrato del Calcio - La Storia 1898-2004, Panini Edizioni, Modena, September 2005
Rules for classification: 1) points; 2) head-to-head points; 3) head-to-head goal difference; 4) head-to-head goals scored; 5) goal difference; 6) number of goals scored.
(C) Champions; (E) Eliminated; (P) Promoted; (R) Relegated; (T) Qualified, but not yet for the particular phase indicated

== Results ==
Home \ Away	ANC	ASC	BAR	CAG	CTN	COS	GEN	LCE	LIV	MES	NAP	PAL	SAL	SAM	SIE	TER	TRI	VEN	HEL	VIC
Ancona	—	1–1	1–2	2–1	2–0	1–0	1–0	1–3	1–0	2–1	3–2	4–2	3–1	1–1	1–1	1–1	3–0	2–1	1–1	3–1
Ascoli	1–0	—	3–2	1–1	2–1	3–0	1–1	1–0	2–1	1–0	4–0	1–2	3–0	0–0	2–1	2–0	2–2	1–2	0–0	1–4
Bari	0–0	2–0	—	0–0	2–1	1–0	2–1	1–1	0–3	1–0	0–1	0–1	1–1	1–1	0–0	2–1	0–0	0–1	1–1	1–1
Cagliari	2–1	1–0	1–0	—	1–2	3–0	1–0	1–1	1–1	0–2	2–2	2–2	2–0	1–0	2–3	1–1	2–0	1–0	2–1	3–0
Catania	0–0	1–1	1–0	2–1	—	0–2	3–2	2–1	3–2	1–1	0–2	2–0	2–1	0–0	2–0	3–1	1–2	0–2	2–1	2–1
Cosenza	0–0	1–0	0–2	1–1	3–1	—	2–1	1–2	0–2	3–3	1–0	1–2	0–0	1–3	0–0	0–3	1–0	1–2	0–1	2–1
Genoa	4–2	1–2	0–0	1–3	2–0	3–0	—	0–0	3–1	1–1	3–1	1–1	3–0	0–2	1–3	1–0	2–2	0–0	2–2	0–2
Lecce	2–1	2–1	1–0	1–1	1–0	0–0	2–1	—	1–0	1–1	1–1	3–0	2–1	1–0	1–1	0–0	1–1	3–1	1–1	1–1
Livorno	1–1	2–0	2–2	1–0	2–1	4–2	2–0	1–2	—	4–1	1–1	2–2	0–0	1–1	1–1	1–2	2–0	2–1	1–1	2–2
Messina	1–1	3–2	2–2	2–2	3–3	1–0	2–1	0–2	2–1	—	1–1	2–1	2–0	3–3	0–0	2–2	2–2	1–1	2–1	3–1
Napoli	1–1	2–0	1–1	2–0	1–0	1–2	2–2	1–1	0–1	1–0	—	0–0	2–1	1–1	1–2	1–0	2–1	1–1	0–0	2–1
Palermo	0–1	2–2	2–2	1–1	3–3	1–0	0–0	2–0	1–0	2–1	2–1	—	1–1	0–0	1–0	2–1	1–0	0–2	2–0	1–0
Salernitana	0–2	1–2	1–2	1–2	0–0	1–2	2–2	2–1	2–1	0–0	2–0	3–1	—	0–1	1–1	0–3	2–2	1–1	1–3	0–1
Sampdoria	2–1	3–0	1–1	3–1	1–0	2–1	2–1	4–2	2–0	1–1	2–0	1–0	1–0	—	0–0	1–2	1–1	4–0	3–2	0–0
Siena	0–0	4–0	1–1	1–0	4–3	1–0	2–1	0–0	2–0	1–0	2–0	2–1	3–0	1–0	—	0–1	1–0	0–0	0–0	0–0
Ternana	1–0	2–1	2–1	0–1	3–1	1–0	1–3	0–0	1–1	1–0	1–1	0–0	4–0	1–1	1–1	—	1–2	1–1	1–0	1–1
Triestina	3–2	3–1	1–2	3–0	4–0	1–0	1–0	0–1	1–0	2–1	2–1	2–1	2–0	2–2	2–1	4–3	—	1–2	3–1	1–1
Venezia	2–4	1–1	1–1	3–0	2–1	0–2	0–1	2–2	1–1	0–2	2–1	0–2	1–0	3–1	1–3	0–0	1–0	—	1–1	1–2
Hellas Verona	0–1	1–0	1–1	1–1	2–0	1–0	2–2	1–1	0–1	4–1	2–2	0–0	2–0	0–0	1–2	0–1	1–0	1–0	—	4–2
Vicenza	1–1	2–1	1–1	4–2	2–1	3–0	1–0	1–1	0–0	2–1	3–3	1–3	2–2	1–2	1–1	1–0	1–1	2–1	4–1	—

Source: Almanacco Illustrato del Calcio - La Storia 1898-2004, Panini Edizioni, Modena, September 2005
Legend: Blue = home team win; Yellow = draw; Red = away team win.

== Attendances ==
#	Club	Average
1	Napoli	28,599
2	Sampdoria	21,802
3	Palermo	16,282
4	Genoa	12,371
5	Catania	11,849
6	Hellas	11,163
7	Lecce	11,055
8	Livorno	10,886
9	Triestina	10,444
10	Ternana	8,872
11	Ancona	8,536
12	Salernitana	8,501
13	Ascoli	8,391
14	Cagliari	7,354
15	Messina	7,054
16	Vicenza	6,399
17	Siena	6,301
18	Bari	5,613
19	Cosenza	3,541
20	Venezia	2,889
