= Vincenzo Montefusco =

Italian footballer and manager

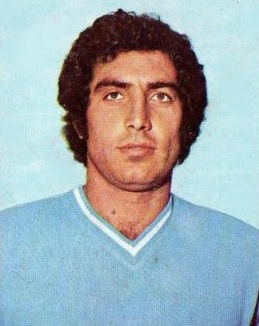

Personal information
- Date of birth: 26 April 1945 (age 81)
- Place of birth: Naples, Italy
- Position: Defensive midfielder

Youth career
- ?–1959: Società Meridionale Elettrica
- 1959–1960: Fiamma Sangiovannese
- 1960–1962: Napoli

Senior career*
Years	Team	Apps	(Gls)
1962–1977	Napoli	156	(7)
1970–1971	→ Foggia (loan)	?	(2)
1972–1973	→ Vicenza (loan)	26	(1)
1974–1975	→ Taranto (loan)	16	(2)

International career
1968	Italy	1	(0)

Managerial career
- 1977–1978: Nuovo Posillipo Napoli
- 1978–1979: Cassino
- 1979–1981: Paganese
- 1981–1982: Campobasso
- 1982–1983: Casertana
- 1983–1984: Campania
- 1984–1986: Cosenza
- 1986–1987: Juve Stabia
- 1987–1988: Nocerina
- 1988–1989: Casertana
- 1989–1991: Empoli
- 1991–1992: Baracca Lugo
- 1992–1993: Pisa
- 1997: Napoli
- 1998: Napoli
- 1999: Napoli
- * Club domestic league appearances and goals

Vincenzo "Enzo" Montefusco (born 26 April 1945 in Naples) is an Italian former football player and manager, who played as a midfielder. He is most noted for his association with his hometown side Napoli, where he played for over a decade as a player. He also had several managerial spells in Serie B and Serie C, with teams such as Cosenza and Pisa, before joining Napoli's coaching staff in the role of the team's youth coach. During the late 1990s he also served three times as the club's caretaker manager, replacing Luigi Simoni, Giovanni Galeone and Renzo Ulivieri respectively. He was ultimately sacked by Napoli following the club's promotion to Serie A at the end of the 1999–2000 season. In 2008, he became director of football of Real Marcianise in Lega Pro.
