= Alessandro Zanellati =

Italian footballer (born 1999)

Personal information
- Date of birth: 23 September 1999 (age 27)
- Place of birth: Moncalieri, Italy
- Height: 1.93 m (6 ft 4 in)
- Position: Goalkeeper

Team information
- Current team: Cittadella
- Number: 69

Youth career
- –2018: Torino

Senior career*
Years	Team	Apps	(Gls)
2018–2020	Torino	0	(0)
2018–2019	→ AC Rezzato (loan)	34	(0)
2019–2020	→ Gubbio (loan)	3	(0)
2020–2022	Giana Erminio	51	(0)
2022–2024	Padova	5	(0)
2024–2025	Casertana	29	(0)
2025–	Cittadella	18	(0)
- * Club domestic league appearances and goals as of 29 April 2026

Alessandro Zanellati (born 23 September 1999) is an Italian football player who plays for Serie C Group A club Cittadella.

== Club career ==
=== Torino ===
He was raised in the Torino youth teams and started playing for their Under-19 squad in the 2017–18 season. He has not been called up to the senior squad.

==== Loan to Rezzato ====
For 2018–19 season, he joined Serie D club AC Rezzato on loan.

==== Loan to Gubbio ====
In July 2019 he joined Gubbio in Serie C on loan.

He made his professional Serie C debut for Gubbio on 1 September 2019 in a game against Virtus Verona.

=== Giana Erminio ===
On 10 September 2020 he signed a 2-year contract with Giana Erminio.

=== Padova ===
On 6 July 2022, Zanelatti moved to Padova.

=== Casertana ===
On 11 July 2024, Zanelatti joined Casertana.
