= Aldo Sensibile =

Italian footballer and coach (born 1947)

Personal information
- Date of birth: 18 December 1947 (age 78)
- Place of birth: Lecce, Italy
- Height: 1.72 m (5 ft 7 1/2 in)
- Position: Defender

Senior career*
Years	Team	Apps	(Gls)
1964–1965	Lecce	12	(0)
1965–1967	Roma	30	(0)
1967–1969	Lecco	43	(1)
1969–1975	Brindisi	179	(4)

Managerial career
- 1983–1984: Rende
- 1985–1987: Ascoli
- 1987–1989: Monopoli
- Siena (youth)
- Lecce (youth)
- 1991: Lecce
- 1995–1996: Napoli (assistant)
- * Club domestic league appearances and goals

Aldo Sensibile (born 18 December 1947) is an Italian professional football coach and a former player.

He played for two seasons (30 games, no goals) in the Serie A for A.S. Roma.

As a coach, he managed Ascoli Calcio 1898 in the Serie A in the 1986/87 season (they were promoted to the Serie A under his management in the previous season). He also coached U.S. Lecce for six games before being replaced by Italian football manager Alberto Bigon.
