= Tommaso Ghirardello =

Italian footballer (born 2005)

Personal information
- Date of birth: 19 October 2005 (age 21)
- Place of birth: Rovigo, Italy
- Height: 1.86 m (6 ft 1 in)
- Position: Winger

Team information
- Current team: Gubbio
- Number: 73

Youth career
- 2010–2015: GS Duomo
- 2015–2025: Padova
- → SPAL (loan)
- 2021–2022: → Juventus (loan)
- 2023–2025: → Genoa (loan)

Senior career*
Years	Team	Apps	(Gls)
2022–2024	Padova	4	(0)
2025–	Gubbio	30	(3)
- * Club domestic league appearances and goals as of 30 April 2026

Tommaso Ghirardello (born 19 October 2005) is an Italian professional footballer who plays as a winger for Serie C Group B club Gubbio.

== Club career ==
Born in Rovigo and raised in Lendinara, Ghirardello started playing football at the local grassroots club GS Duomo, before joining Padova in 2015. Here, he spent most of his youth career, except for two loan spells, respectively, at S.P.A.L. and Juventus.

Having come back to Padova in the summer of 2022, Ghirardello was subsequently promoted to the first team by the club's new manager, Bruno Caneo. He subsequently made his professional debut on 1 August 2022, at 16 years and 10 months, coming in as a substitute for Simone Russini at the 67th minute of a 3-0 defeat against Bari, a match that was part of the preliminary round of the Coppa Italia. On 3 September, he made his Serie C debut, replacing Fabio Ceravolo in the second half of the league match against Pro Vercelli, which ended in a 1-0 loss.

On 31 July 2023, Ghirardello officially joined Serie A club Genoa, being initially assigned to the under-19 squad.

== Style of play ==
Ghirardello mainly acts as a winger, and has been regarded mainly for his pace, his physical strength and his technical abilities with both feet, which allow him to find numerous chances for goals or assists.

== Career statistics ==
As of match played 22 April 2023

Appearances and goals by club, season and competition
Club	Season	League			National Cup		Continental		Total	
Club	Season	Division	Apps	Goals	Apps	Goals	Apps	Goals	Apps	Goals
Padova	2022–23	Serie C	4	0	1	0	–		5	0
Career total			4	0	1	0	0	0	5	0
