= SSC Napoli =

Association football club in Italy

Napoli
- Full name: Società Sportiva Calcio Napoli S.p.A.
- Nicknames: Gli Azzurri (The Blues); I Partenopei (The Parthenopeans); I Ciucciarelli (The Little Donkeys)
- Founded: 25 August 1926; 100 years ago, as Associazione Calcio Napoli; 6 September 2004; 22 years ago, as Napoli Soccer then SSC Napoli
- Stadium: Stadio Diego Armando Maradona
- Capacity: 54,732
- Owner: Filmauro S.r.l.
- President: Aurelio De Laurentiis
- Head coach: Massimiliano Allegri
- League: Serie A
- 2025–26: Serie A, 2nd of 20
- Website: sscnapoli.it
Home colours	Away colours	Third colours

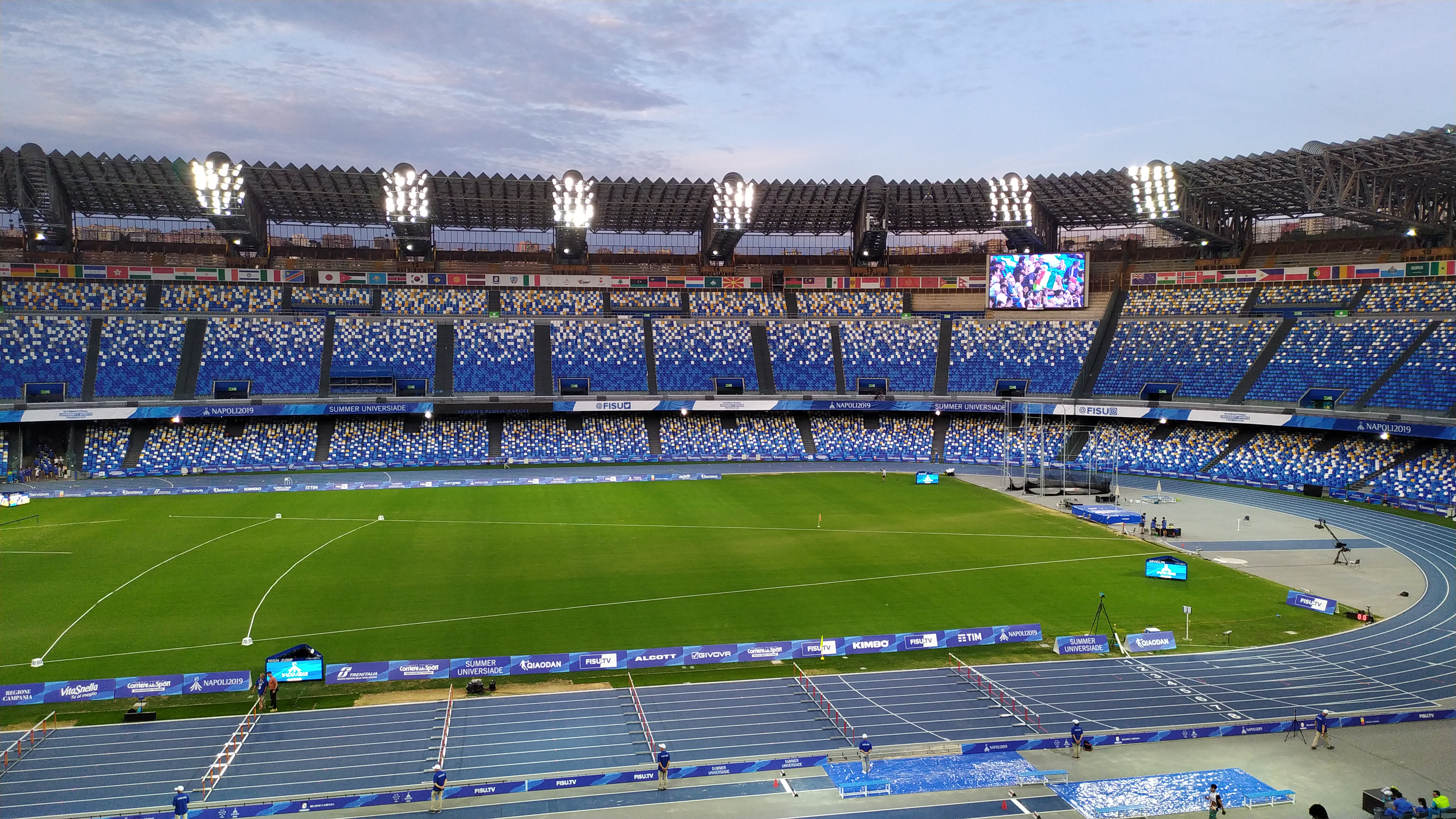
The stadium after its most-recent renovations, during the XXX Summer Universiade.

Società Sportiva Calcio Napoli (pronounced [sotʃeˈta sporˈtiːva ˈkaltʃo ˈnaːpoli]), commonly known as SSC Napoli or simply Napoli, is an Italian professional football club based in Naples, Campania, that plays in Serie A, the top league of Italian football. They are among the most successful clubs in the nation, with four league titles, six Coppe Italia, three Supercoppe Italiane, and one UEFA Cup.

The club was formed in 1926 as Associazione Calcio Napoli following the merger of US Internazionale Napoli and Naples Foot-Ball Club. Napoli saw relatively little success in their early years, not winning their first major trophy until the 1962 Coppa Italia. The club enjoyed increased success in the 1970s and 1980s, winning the 1976 Coppa Italia and reaching new heights following the arrival of Diego Maradona in 1984. During his time with Napoli, the club won their first two league titles, in 1987 and 1990. His seven seasons in Naples also saw them win the 1987 Coppa Italia, the 1990 Supercoppa Italiana, and the 1989 UEFA Cup—their only European trophy. Following Maradona's departure in 1991 however, Napoli struggled financially, and endured relegations and a bankruptcy prior to being re-founded in 2004 by film producer Aurelio De Laurentiis. Napoli returned to Serie A three years later, and have been among the top clubs in Italian football since, winning three Coppa Italia (2012, 2014, and 2020), two Supercoppa Italiana (2014 and 2025–26), and two Serie A titles (2023 and 2025).

By attendance, Napoli has the fourth-largest fan base in Italy, and was ranked as the fifth-highest-earning football club in Serie A, with $182 million in revenue during the 2017–18 season. In 2018, Forbes estimated Napoli to be worth $379 million, making them the fifth most-valuable club in Italy. Napoli are also one of the associate members of the European Club Association.

Since 1959, the club has played its home games at the Stadio San Paolo, which was renamed Stadio Diego Armando Maradona following his death in 2020. Napoli traditionally wear sky blue shirts, white shorts, and sky blue socks at home and white shirts, white or sky blue shorts, and white or sky blue socks away; this is derived from the shirts of Naples FBC and the shorts of Internazionale Napoli after the clubs merged to form Napoli's predecessor Internaples in 1922. Napoli have rivalries with Juventus, Roma (Derby del Sole), Internazionale, AC Milan and Salernitana (Derby of Campania). The club's anthem is "Napoli", one of the major hits of the Neapolitan singer Nino D'Angelo.

== History ==
=== Origins (1905-1922) ===
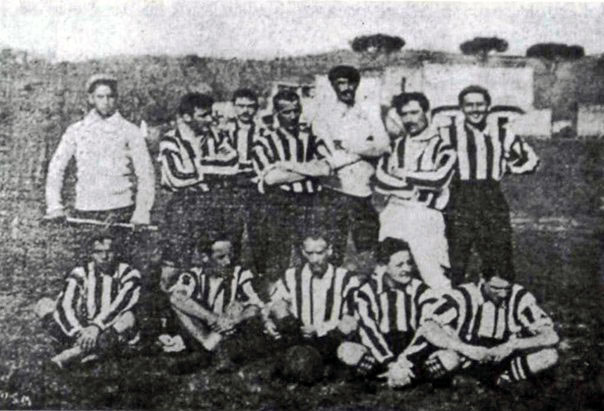
Team of "Naples F.C.", predecessor of current club, in 1906

Although the club was officially founded in 1926, Napoli traces its roots to the first relevant Neapolitan club, founded as Naples Foot-Ball & Cricket Club (Note: Some sources say the name was spelled Naples Foot-Ball and Croquet Club.) in 1905 by English sailor William Poths and his associate Hector M. Bayon. Neapolitans such as Conforti, Catterina and Amedeo Salsi were also involved; Salsi was named the club's first president. The original kit of the club was a sky blue and navy blue striped shirt, with black shorts. Naples' first match was a 3–2 win against the English crew of the boat Arabik with goals from William MacPherson, Michele Scafoglio and Léon Chaudoir.

Early into its existence, the Italian Football Championship was limited to just northern clubs, so southern clubs competed against sailors or in cups such as Thomas Lipton's Lipton Challenge Cup. In the cup competed between Naples FBC and Palermo FBC Naples won three finals. The foreign contingent at the club broke off in 1911 to form Internazionale Napoli, who wore blue shirts with white shorts, in time for both club's debut in the Italian Championship of 1912–13. Each of the teams won a Prima Categoria southern Italian titles and therefore competed in the national semi-finals, Naples doing so in 1912–13 and Internazionale Napoli in 1913–14. They were set to face each other for the southern titles again in 1914–15 but it was cancelled due to World War I.

=== FBC Internaples (1922-1926) ===
Due to financial pressure, the two rival clubs merged as the "Foot-Ball Club Internazionale-Naples", abbreviated as "FBC Internaples" in October 1922. Internaples', and later Napoli's kits are derived from those of Naples FBC and Internazionale Napoli; adopting the sky blue from Naples' shirts and the white shorts from Internazionale Napoli.

The merged club was seen by some media and fans to be a continuation of Internazionale Napoli rather than a new club; it played its games at Internazionale Napoli's Terme di Agnano rather than Naples FBC's Campo del Poligono and kept Internazionale Napoli's nickname of Gli Azzurri (The Blues) rather than I Blucelesti (The Navy Blue and Sky Blues) used by Naples. Internaples were also given the nickname I Puledri (the foals), as the horse is a symbol of Naples.

Internaples were immediately enrolled in the top-flight Prima Divisione Lega Sud championship, as both Internazionale Napoli and Naples competed in that division pre-merger. Since the end of World War I both clubs had lost dominance of the region to the likes of Puteolana and Savoia. Even with the combined strength of Internaples, Savoia still proved to be the top team in southern Italy. Internaples reached the interregional semi-finals of Lega Sud in each of its first two seasons, and reached the Lega Sud finals in 1925–26. This secured the club a spot in the new Divisione Nazionale for the following season.

=== The birth of Associazione Calcio Napoli (1926-1945) ===
Under the presidency of Giorgio Ascarelli, and likely under pressure from the new fascist government to "Italianize" the club, Internaples changed its name to Associazione Calcio Napoli on 25 August 1926. The newly renamed team also moved from the Terme di Agnano to a new stadium, the Stadio Militare dell'Arenaccia. After a poor start, with a sole point in an entire championship, Napoli was re-admitted to Serie A's forerunner, the Divisione Nazionale, by the Italian Football Federation ("FIGC"), and began to improve thanks in part to Paraguayan-born Attila Sallustro, who was the first fully fledged hero to the fans. He was a capable goal-scorer and eventually set the all-time goal-scoring record for Napoli, which was later surpassed by players like Diego Maradona and Marek Hamšík.

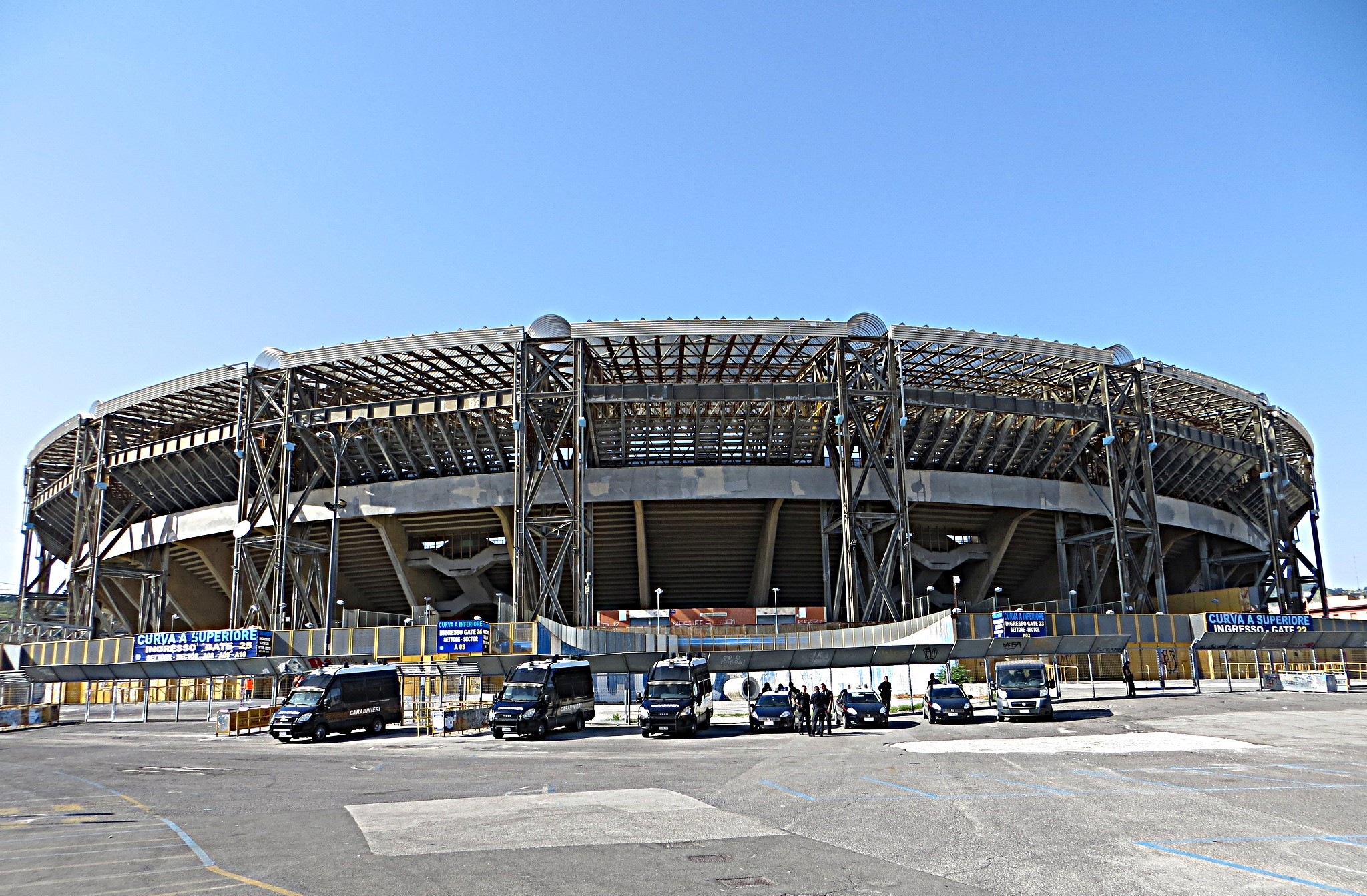
Napoli moved to the new Stadio San Paolo in 1959, where they have played since.

Napoli entered the Serie A era under the management of William Garbutt. During Garbutt's six-year stint, the club would be dramatically transformed, frequently finishing in the top half of the table. This included two third-place finishes during the 1932–33 and 1933–34 seasons, with added notables such as Antonio Vojak, Arnaldo Sentimenti and Carlo Buscaglia. However, in the years leading up to World War II, Napoli went into decline, only surviving relegation in 1939–40 by goal average.

Napoli lost a closely contested relegation battle at the end of 1942 and were relegated to Serie B. They moved from the Stadio Giorgio Ascarelli to the Stadio Arturo Collana and remained in Serie B until after the war.

=== Post-war era and first trophies (1945-1964) ===
Play restarted in 1945 with two divisions: one consisting of Serie A teams from the north and one combined division of Serie A and Serie B teams from the central and south, with the top four of each division advancing to the national round that followed. Napoli won the Centro-Sud Serie A-B to secure a place in the Divisione Nazionale (where they placed fifth) and automatic promotion to the next season's Serie A. They were relegated after two seasons for a bribery scandal. The club won the Serie B titles that season to ensure top flight football at the start of the 1950s. Napoli moved to their new home ground Stadio San Paolo in 1959.

Despite erratic league form with highs and lows during this period, including multiple relegations and promotions, Napoli won their first major trophy when they beat SPAL to lift the Coppa Italia in 1962, with goals from Gianni Corelli and Pierluigi Ronzon. The victory made Napoli the first team to win the Coppa while in Serie B, and they were promoted to Serie A that season. Their fourth relegation cut celebrations short the following season.

=== Name change and success (1964-1984) ===
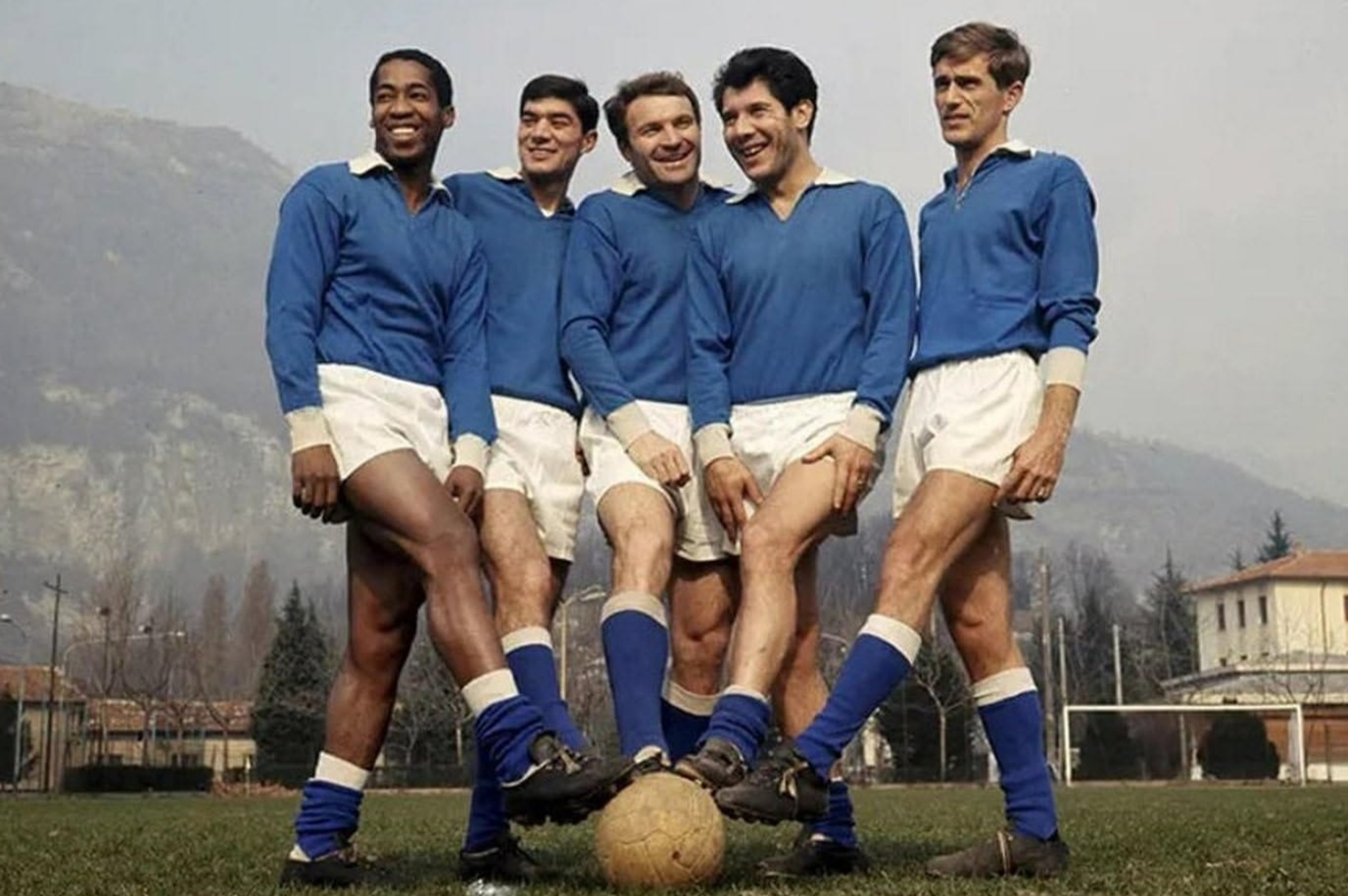
SSC Napoli retreat in Canzo, March 1966

As the club changed their name to Società Sportiva Calcio Napoli on 25 June 1964 they began to rise up again, gaining promotion in 1964–65. Under the management of former player Bruno Pesaola, they won the Coppa delle Alpi and were back among the elite in Serie A, with consistent top-five finishes. Napoli came very close to winning the league in 1967–68, finishing just behind Milan in second place. Some of the most popular players from this period were Dino Zoff, José Altafini, Omar Sívori and hometown midfielder Antonio Juliano. Juliano would eventually break the appearance records, which still stands today.

Napoli at the start of the 1970s with Dino Zoff, José Altafini, and others

The trend of Napoli performing well in the league continued into the 1970s, with third place spots in 1970–71 and 1973–74. Under the coaching of former player Luís Vinício, this gained them entry into the early UEFA Cup competitions. In 1974–75, they reached the third round knocking out Porto 2–0 en route. During the same season, Napoli finished second in Serie A, just two points behind champions Juventus. Solid performances from locally born players such as Giuseppe Bruscolotti, Antonio Juliano and Salvatore Esposito were relied upon during this period, coupled with goals from Giuseppe Savoldi.

The club won their second Coppa Italia trophy in 1975–76, eliminating Milan and Fiorentina en route, before beating rivals Hellas Verona 4–0 in the finals. That season, they also defeated Southampton 4–1 on aggregate to lift the 1976 Anglo-Italian League Cup. Napoli were entered into the UEFA Cup Winners' Cup for 1976–77, where they reached the semi-finals, losing 2–1 on aggregate to Anderlecht. In the Italian league, Napoli were still very much a consistent top six side for much of the late 1970s. Even into the earliest two seasons of the 1980s, the club were performing respectably with a third-place finish in 1980–81. Napoli's Primavera squad was also doing well at the time, winning the Torneo di Viareggio Cup in 1975 and their only Campionato Nazionale Primavera title in 1979. However, by 1983, they had slipped dramatically and were involved in relegation battles.

=== Maradona era (1984-1992) ===
Napoli broke the world transfer record fee after acquiring Diego Maradona in a €12 million deal from Barcelona on 30 June 1984. The squad was gradually re-built, with the likes of Ciro Ferrara, Salvatore Bagni and Fernando De Napoli filling the ranks. The rise up the tables was gradual, by 1985–86, they had a third-place finish under their belts, but better was yet to come. With the attacking trio of Maradona, Bruno Giordano, and Careca (nicknamed MaGiCa), the 1986–87 season was the landmark in Napoli's history, becoming just the third Italian team to win the double after securing the Serie A title by three points and then beating Atalanta 4–0 to lift the Coppa Italia.

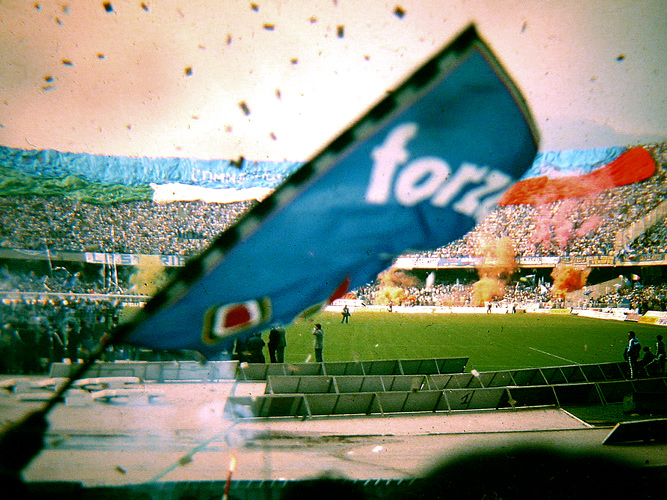
Napoli supporters celebrating the team's first scudetto in May 1987

Because a mainland Southern Italian team had never won the league before, this turned Maradona into a cultural, social and borderline religious icon for Neapolitans, which stretched beyond the realms of just football.

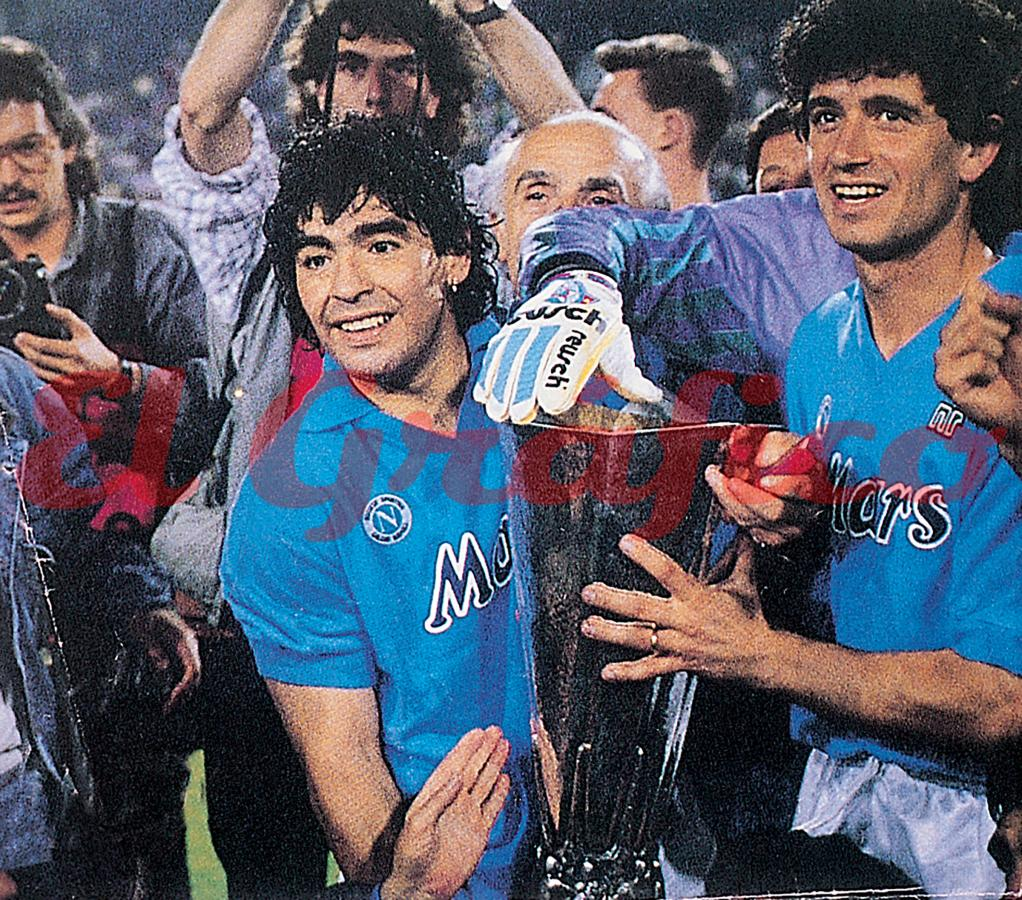
Diego Maradona celebrating with the UEFA Cup trophy after beating VfB Stuttgart, May 1989

The club were unsuccessful in the European Cup in the following season and finished runners-up in Serie A. However, Napoli were entered into the UEFA Cup for 1988–89 and won their first major European title. Juventus, Bayern Munich and PAOK were defeated en route to the final, where Napoli beat VfB Stuttgart 5–4 on aggregate, with two goals from Careca and one each from Maradona, Ferrara and Alemão.

Napoli added their second Serie A title in 1989–90, defeating Milan by two points in the title race. However, this was surrounded by less auspicious circumstances as Napoli were awarded two points for a game, when in Bergamo, an Atalanta fan threw a 100 lira coin at Alemão's head.

A controversial set of events set off at the 1990 World Cup, when Maradona made comments pertaining to North–South inequality in the country and the risorgimento, asking Neapolitans to root for Argentina in the semi-finals against Italy in Naples.

I don't like the fact that now everybody is asking Neapolitans to be Italian and to support their national team. Naples has always been marginalised by the rest of Italy. It is a city that suffers the most unfair racism.

— Diego Maradona, July 1990

The Stadio San Paolo was the only stadium during the competition where the Argentine National Anthem was not jeered, Maradona bowed to the Napoli fans at the end and his country went on to reach the finals. However, after the finals, the Italian Football Federation (FIGC) forced Maradona to take a doping test, which he failed testing positive for cocaine; both Maradona and Napoli staff later claimed it was a revenge plot for events at the World Cup. Maradona was banned for 15 months and would never play for the club again. The club still won the Supercoppa Italiana that year, with a record 5–1 victory against Juventus, but it would be their last major trophy for 22 years. In the European Cup, they were eliminated in the second round.

=== Decline and bankruptcy (1992-2005) ===
Though the club finished fourth during the 1991–92 season, Napoli gradually went into decline after that season, both financially and on the field. Players such as Gianfranco Zola, Daniel Fonseca, Ciro Ferrara and Careca had all departed by 1994. Nonetheless, Napoli qualified for the 1994–95 UEFA Cup, reaching the third round and in 1996–97, Napoli appeared at the Coppa Italia finals, but lost 3–1 to Vicenza; Napoli's primavera squad won the Coppa Italia Primavera that season. Napoli's league form had dropped lower, and relegation to Serie B came at the end of 1997–98 when they won only two matches all season.

The club returned to Serie A after gaining promotion in the 1999–2000 season, though after a closely contested relegation battle, they were relegated immediately back down the following season. By August 2004, Napoli was declared bankrupt. To secure football in the city, film producer Aurelio De Laurentiis re-founded the club under the name Napoli Soccer, as they were not allowed to use their old name until the next season. FIGC placed Napoli in Serie C1, where they missed out on promotion after losing 2–1 in play-offs to local rivals Avellino in 2004–05.

Despite the fact Napoli were playing in a low division, they retained higher average attendances than most of the Serie A clubs, breaking the Serie C attendance record with 51,000 at one match.

=== Resurgence (2005-2011) ===
The following season, manager Edoardo Reja was hired. Under his leadership they secured promotion to Serie B and De Laurentiis brought back the club's history, restoring its name to Società Sportiva Calcio Napoli in May 2006. After just one season in Serie B, they were promoted to the top division, along with Juventus and other fellow "sleeping giants" Genoa. For the 2007-08 season, Napoli spent much (€44.6 million in total) and acquired players in the millions, such as Daniele Mannini and Ezequiel Lavezzi. Also, Marek Hamšík was signed that summer. Despite losing the opening game to Cagliari Calcio, the team could place itself in the middle of the table. Up to the last matchday, the club fought for the UEFA Intertoto Cup berth, with their biggest rival being again promotees Genoa. Despite Napoli losing to Lazio on the final matchday, Europe was secured thanks to Genoa's 2-0 loss to Atalanta. After winning in the Intertoto Cup against Panionios F.C. from Greece, the team successfully entered the 2008–09 UEFA Cup and qualified after thrashing Albanian KF Vllaznia 8-0 on aggregate, only to be eliminated in the first round by a last-minute winner by Benfica. However, the club fared better in Serie A: The club was as high as second place in the table by matchday 5 and was fifth for the first half of the season, but squandering valuable points, including a winless streak of 15 games, meant 12th place by the end. After Reja was replaced by Walter Mazzarri, Napoli finished in sixth place in the 2009-10 season to qualify for a 2010–11 UEFA Europa League spot. Napoli finished third in the 2010–11 season, qualifying directly for the group stage of the 2011–12 UEFA Champions League.

=== Regular in european football and further success (2011-2022) ===
In the 2011–12 season, Napoli ended in fifth place in Serie A, but defeated unbeaten champions Juventus at the Stadio Olimpico to win the Coppa Italia for the fourth time in the club's history, 25 years after their last cup win. The team finished second in its group of the 2011–12 UEFA Champions League, progressing to the round of 16, where they were eliminated by eventual winners Chelsea. In 2012–13, Napoli finished in second place in Serie A, the club's best performance since winning the 1989–90 Scudetto. Edinson Cavani finished as top scorer in the division with 29 goals, which resulted in him being sold to Paris Saint-Germain for a club-record fee of €64 million.

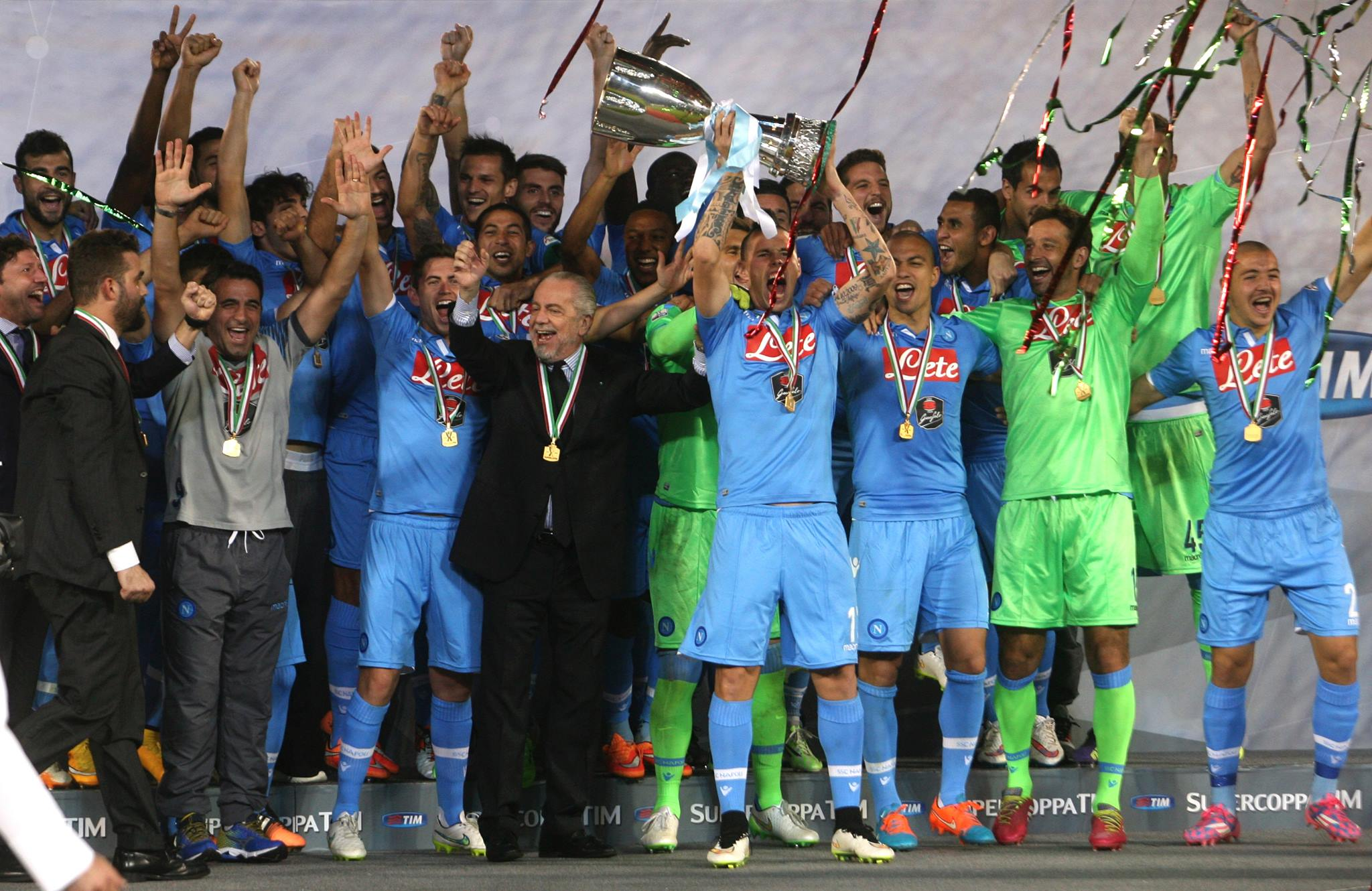
Napoli celebrating their 2014 Supercoppa Italiana win

In the 2013 close-season, Mazzarri left Napoli and Rafael Benítez became the club's manager. They finished the 2013–14 season by winning the 2014 Coppa Italia finals, their fifth title in the tournament, with a 3–1 win against Fiorentina, as well as qualifying for the Champions League, but missed out on the group stage as they lost to Athletic Bilbao in the play-off round. Their subsequent run in the Europa League ended when they lost 2–1 on aggregate to Dnipro in the semi-finals. They finished the 2014–15 season in fifth, with Benítez then leaving for Real Madrid and being replaced by Maurizio Sarri.

In Sarri's first season in charge in the 2015–16 season, Napoli finished in second place with 82 points, and were knocked out of the Europa League in the round of 32 against Villarreal. In the following season, Napoli finished in third place on 86 points and but lost in Champions League round of 16 against Real Madrid. This year saw the breakout season for Dries Mertens who scored 34 goals in all competitions after he was moved from the left-wing to centre-forward following Arkadiusz Milik's torn Anterior cruciate ligament.

In the 2017–18 season, Napoli challenged for the title for the entire season, and finished with a club record of 91 points. However, the title ultimately went to Juventus in the penultimate round of matches. On 23 December 2017, Marek Hamšík overtook Diego Maradona as Napoli's all-time leading scorer after scoring his 115th goal. At the end of the season, Sarri left for Chelsea, succeeded by Carlo Ancelotti in May 2018. He managed the club to another second-place finish, but was sacked on 10 December 2019, following a poor run of results in the 2019–20 season which left them seventh in the table. Gennaro Gattuso was named head coach the next day. On 14 June 2020, Dries Mertens became Napoli's all-time top scorer after scoring his 122nd goal in a Coppa Italia semi-finals match against Inter. Napoli went on to win the 2019–20 Coppa Italia in a penalty shoot-out against Juventus in the finals.

In December 2020, Napoli renamed Stadio San Paolo after club icon Diego Maradona, following his passing. Napoli finished fifth in Serie A that season after a draw on the finals day, missing a Champions League berth by one point.

In the 2021–22 season, Luciano Spalletti replaced Gennaro Gattuso as head coach and led the team to the third place in Serie A, securing a Champions League spot for the azzurri after a two-years absence.

=== Scudetto return (2022-present) ===
In the 2022–23 season, Napoli clinched the Serie A title for the first time since the 1989–90 season, and their third title overall, following a 1–1 draw against Udinese on 4 May 2023, their first time as titleholders since the days of Diego Maradona. Meanwhile, in the Champions League, Spalletti led them to the quarter-finals for the first time in their European history, where they were beaten 2–1 (1–0 away and 1–1 at home) by fellow Serie A side Milan.

The 2023–24 season proved to be extremely difficult for the club, as they went through three different coaches – Rudi Garcia, a returning Walter Mazzarri, and Francesco Calzona; this managerial instability, as well as the new hires largely not performing to the club's expectations, led the Azzurri to finish 10th in the league, 41 points behind eventual champions Inter. In Europe, the club passed the group stage of the 2023–24 UEFA Champions League in a group with Real Madrid, Union Berlin and Braga, but were ultimately eliminated by Barcelona in the round of 16. The club also faced criticism in 2023 for a TikTok video featuring Victor Osimhen that used audio with the lyric “I’m a coconut.”

For the 2024–25 season, the club signed Antonio Conte in a bid to contest the title again. Their season started out with a 3–0 away loss against Hellas Verona, but the Azzurri quickly bounced back with five wins and one draw in the following six matches. The team also signed Scott McTominay and Romelu Lukaku late during summer, both players turning out to be very important for the title campaign. Napoli maintained strong form throughout the campaign and entered the final matchday one point ahead of Inter Milan, and won the title by winning 2–0 over Cagliari on 23 May, winning their fourth title, the second in a three-year span, cementing Napoli as a consistent contender in the Serie A.

Napoli continued to see success during the 2025-26 season. Although they were unable to retain their Scudetto title, with Inter Milan winning it instead, Napoli finished as runners up (2nd in the table) with 76 points (11 behind Inter), following a 1–0 win against Udinese on the last matchday, thus representing a significantly improved title defence compared to the difficult 2023-24 season. In addition, Napoli won the 2025–26 Supercoppa Italiana by defeating Bologna 2–0 at the King Saud University Stadium in Riyadh. Despite this, Napoli's 2025–26 UEFA Champions League campaign was less successful, only managing two wins (against Sporting CP and Qarabag FK, both at home) in the league phase, with the club ultimately being knocked out of the competition following a 2–3 home loss to Chelsea on the 28th of January 2026. The 2025–26 season marked the final season for Antonio Conte, who left the club by mutual consent at the end of this year. Therefore, Conte departed Napoli having won two trophies across his two seasons in charge: the 2024–25 Scudetto and the 2025 Supercoppa Italiana.

Following Conte's departure from Napoli by mutual consent, the club signed Massimiliano Allegri as the new manager for the current 2026-27 seaseon.

== Club staff ==
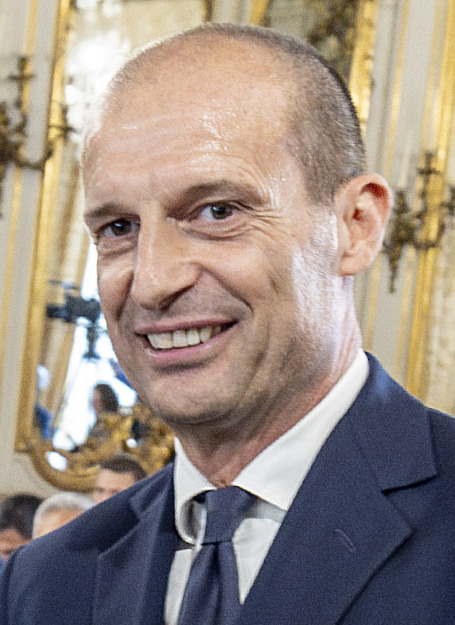
Massimiliano Allegri is the head coach of the club

Position	Staff
Head coach	(Italy) Massimiliano Allegri
Assistant coach	(Italy) Marco Landucci
Technical coach	(Italy) Elvis Abbruscato (Italy) Francesco Magnanelli (Italy) Gianluca Maran
Match analyst	(Italy) Giuseppe Maiuri
Athletic trainer	(Italy) Simone Folletti
Assistant athletic trainer	(Italy) Francesco Cacciapuoti (Italy) Giuseppe Trepiccione
Goalkeeping coach	(Italy) Daniele Borri
Head of medical staff	(Italy) Raffaele Canonico
Club doctor	(Italy) Vincenzo Corrado (Italy) Gennaro De Luca
Social physician	(Italy) Beniamino Casillo
Medical consultant	(Italy) Raffaele Landolfi
Medical reviewer, orthopaedist, and physiatris	(Italy) Angelo Cavallo
Cardiologist and cardiology consultant	(Italy) Antonio Russo
Food technologist and nutritionist	(Italy) Marco Rufolo
Physiotherapist	(Italy) Marco Di Lullo (Italy) Vincenzo Longobardo (Italy) Vittorio Mennella (Italy) Marco Romano (Italy) Paolo Tartaglione (Italy) Nicola Zazzaro

=== Presidents ===
Below is the official presidential history of Napoli, from when Giorgio Ascarelli took over at the club in 1926, until the present day.

Name	Years
Giorgio Ascarelli	1926–1927
Gustavo Zinzaro	1927–1928
Giovanni Maresca	1928–1929
Giorgio Ascarelli	1929–1930
Giovanni Maresca; Eugenio Coppola	1930–1932
Vincenzo Savarese	1932–1936
Achille Lauro	1936–1940
Gaetano Del Pezzo	1941
Tommaso Leonetti	1942–1943
Luigi Piscitelli	1941–1943
Annibale Fienga	1943–1945
Vincenzo Savarese	1945–1946

Name	Years
Pasquale Russo	1946–1948
Egidio Musollino	1948–1951
Alfonso Cuomo	1951–1952
Achille Lauro	1952–1954
Alfonso Cuomo	1954–1963
Luigi Scuotto	1963–1964
Roberto Fiore	1964–1967
Gioacchino Lauro	1967–1968
Antonio Corcione	1968–1969
Corrado Ferlaino	1969–1971
Ettore Sacchi	1971–1972
Corrado Ferlaino	1972–1983
Marino Brancaccio	1983

Name	Years
Corrado Ferlaino	1983–1993
Ellenio F. Gallo	1993–1995
Vincenzo Schiano di Colella (honorary president)	1995–1996
Gian Marco Innocenti (honorary president)	1997–1998
Federico Scalingi (honorary president)	1999–2000
Giorgio Corbelli	2000–2002
Salvatore Naldi	2002–2004
Aurelio De Laurentiis	2004–

=== Managers ===
Napoli has had many managers and trainers, co-managers in some seasons, since 1926.

Name	Nationality	Years
Antonio Kreutzer	(Austria)	1926–1927
Bino Skasa	(Austria)	1927
Technical Commission; Rolf Steiger; Giovanni Terrile; Ferenc Molnár	(Austria) (Italy) (Kingdom of Hungary)	1927–1928
Otto Fischer	(Austria)	1928
Giovanni Terrile	(Italy)	1928–1929
William Garbutt	(England)	1929–1935
Károly Csapkay	(Kingdom of Hungary)	1935–1936
Angelo Mattea	(Italy)	1936–1938
Eugen Payer	(Kingdom of Hungary)	1938–1939
Technical Commission; Amedeo D'Albora; Paolo Jodice; Luigi Castello; Achille Piccini; Nereo Rocco	(Italy)	1939
Adolfo Baloncieri	(Italy)	1939–1940
Antonio Vojak	(Italy)	1940–1943
Paulo Innocenti	(Italy)	1943
Raffaele Sansone	(Italy)	1945–1947
Giovanni Vecchina	(Italy)	1947–1948
Arnaldo Sentimenti	(Italy)	1948
Felice Placido Borel	(Italy)	1948–1949
Luigi De Manes	(Italy)	1949
Vittorio Mosele	(Italy)	1949
Eraldo Monzeglio	(Italy)	1949–1956
Amedeo Amadei	(Italy)	1956–1959
Annibale Frossi	(Italy)	1959
Amedeo Amadei	(Italy)	1959–1961
Amedeo Amadei	(Italy)	1961
Renato Cesarini	(Italy)	1961
Attila Sallustro	(Italy)	1961
Fioravante Baldi	(Italy)	1961–1962
Bruno Pesaola	(Italy)	1962
Bruno Pesaola	(Italy)	1962–1963
Eraldo Monzeglio	(Italy)	1962–1963
Roberto Lerici	(Italy)	1963–1964
Giovanni Molino	(Italy)	1964
Bruno Pesaola	(Italy)	1964–1968
Giuseppe Chiappella	(Italy)	1968–1969
Egidio Di Costanzo	(Italy)	1969
Giuseppe Chiappella	(Italy)	1969–1973
Luís Vinício	(Brazil)	1973–1976
Alberto Delfrati	(Italy)	1976
Rosario Rivellino	(Italy)	1976
Bruno Pesaola	(Italy)	1976–1977
Rosario Rivellino	(Italy)	1977
Gianni Di Marzio	(Italy)	1977–1978
Luís Vinício	(Brazil)	1978–1980
Angelo Sormani	(Italy)	1980
Rino Marchesi	(Italy)	1980–1982
Massimo Giacomini	(Italy)	1982
Bruno Pesaola	(Italy)	1982–1983
Pietro Santin	(Italy)	1983–1984
Rino Marchesi	(Italy)	1984–1985

Name	Nationality	Years
Ottavio Bianchi	(Italy)	1 July 1986 – 30 June 1989
Alberto Bigon	(Italy)	1989–1991
Claudio Ranieri	(Italy)	1 July 1991 – 30 June 1993
Ottavio Bianchi	(Italy)	1 November 1992 – 30 June 1993
Marcello Lippi	(Italy)	1 July 1993 – 30 June 1994
Vincenzo Guerini	(Italy)	1 July 1994 – 17 October 1994
Vujadin Boškov; Cané (Jarbas Faustinho)	(Federal Republic of Yugoslavia) (Brazil)	18 October 1994 – 1995
Vujadin Boškov; Aldo Sensibile	(Federal Republic of Yugoslavia) (Italy)	1995 – 30 June 1996
Luigi Simoni	(Italy)	1996–1997
Vincenzo Montefusco	(Italy)	1997
Bortolo Mutti	(Italy)	1 July 1997 – 6 October 1997
Carlo Mazzone	(Italy)	19 October 1997 – 24 November 1997
Giovanni Galeone	(Italy)	1997–1998
Vincenzo Montefusco	(Italy)	1998
Renzo Ulivieri	(Italy)	1998–1999
Vincenzo Montefusco	(Italy)	1999
Walter Novellino	(Italy)	1999–2000
Zdeněk Zeman	(Czech Republic)	1 July 2000 – 12 November 2000
Emiliano Mondonico	(Italy)	13 November 2000 – 30 June 2001
Luigi De Canio	(Italy)	1 July 2001 – 30 June 2002
Franco Colomba	(Italy)	1 July 2002 – 16 December 2002
Sergio Buso	(Italy)	2002
Franco Scoglio	(Italy)	18 December 2002 – 30 June 2003
Franco Colomba	(Italy)	2003
Andrea Agostinelli	(Italy)	19 June 2003 – 9 November 2003
Luigi Simoni	(Italy)	10 November 2003 – 30 June 2004
Gian Piero Ventura	(Italy)	1 July 2004 – 25 January 2005
Edoardo Reja	(Italy)	3 January 2005 – 10 March 2009
Roberto Donadoni	(Italy)	10 March 2009 – 5 October 2009
Walter Mazzarri	(Italy)	6 October 2009 – 20 May 2013
Rafael Benítez	(Spain)	27 May 2013 – 31 May 2015
Maurizio Sarri	(Italy)	11 June 2015 – 23 May 2018
Carlo Ancelotti	(Italy)	23 May 2018 – 10 December 2019
Gennaro Gattuso	(Italy)	11 December 2019 – 23 May 2021
Luciano Spalletti	(Italy)	29 May 2021 – 14 June 2023
Rudi Garcia	(France)	15 June 2023 – 14 November 2023
Walter Mazzarri	(Italy)	14 November 2023 – 19 February 2024
Francesco Calzona	(Italy)	19 February 2024 – 5 June 2024
Antonio Conte	(Italy)	5 June 2024 – 24 May 2026

== Players ==
=== Current squad ===
As of 2 September 2026

Note: Flags indicate national team as defined under FIFA eligibility rules; some limited exceptions apply. Players may hold more than one non-FIFA nationality.

No.	Pos.	Nation	Player
1	GK	ITA	Alex Meret
2	DF	ITA	Costantino Favasuli (on loan from Catanzaro)
4	DF	ITA	Alessandro Buongiorno
5	DF	FRA	Benoît Badiashile (on loan from Chelsea)
6	MF	SCO	Billy Gilmour
7	FW	BRA	David Neres
8	MF	SCO	Scott McTominay
11	MF	BEL	Kevin De Bruyne
12	GK	ITA	Claudio Pugliese
13	DF	KOS	Amir Rrahmani
14	GK	UKR	Nikita Contini
16	DF	ESP	Rafa Marín
17	DF	URU	Mathías Olivera
19	FW	DEN	Rasmus Højlund

No.	Pos.	Nation	Player
20	FW	ITA	Lorenzo Lucca
21	FW	ITA	Matteo Politano
22	DF	ITA	Giovanni Di Lorenzo (captain)
23	FW	BRA	Giovane
26	MF	ITA	Antonio Vergara
27	FW	BRA	Alisson Santos
31	DF	NED	Sam Beukema
32	GK	SRB	Vanja Milinković-Savić
35	DF	ITA	Luca Marianucci
37	DF	ITA	Leonardo Spinazzola
68	MF	SVK	Stanislav Lobotka
70	FW	NED	Noa Lang
99	MF	CMR	Frank Anguissa

=== Napoli Primavera ===
As of 1 November 2026

Note: Flags indicate national team as defined under FIFA eligibility rules; some limited exceptions apply. Players may hold more than one non-FIFA nationality.

No.	Pos.	Nation	Player
18	MF	ARG	Francisco Baridó
36	FW	ARG	Milton Pereyra
38	MF	ITA	Andrea Chiummariello

No.	Pos.	Nation	Player
39	DF	UKR	Mykyta Melnyk
40	DF	ITA	Claudio Lieto
41	GK	ITA	David Spinelli

=== Out on loan ===
As of 1 September 2026

Note: Flags indicate national team as defined under FIFA eligibility rules; some limited exceptions apply. Players may hold more than one non-FIFA nationality.

No.	Pos.	Nation	Player
—	GK	ITA	Mathias Ferrante (at Ospitaletto until 30 June 2027)
—	GK	ITA	Claudio Turi (at Pineto until 30 June 2027)
—	DF	ITA	Luigi D'Avino (at Giugliano until 30 June 2027)
—	DF	ITA	Christian Garofalo (at Dolomiti Bellunesi until 30 June 2027)
—	DF	ITA	Pasquale Mazzocchi (at Venezia until 30 June 2027)
—	DF	ITA	Nosa Edward Obaretin (at Lorient until 30 June 2027)
—	MF	SWE	Jens Cajuste (at Málaga until 30 June 2027)
—	MF	ITA	Michael Folorunsho (at Monza until 30 June 2027)
—	MF	ITA	Lorenzo Russo (at Crotone until 30 June 2027)

No.	Pos.	Nation	Player
—	FW	ITA	Giuseppe Ambrosino (at Modena until 30 June 2027)
—	FW	ITA	Mattia Esposito (at Bari until 30 June 2027)
—	FW	DEN	Jesper Lindstrøm (at Red Bull Salzburg until 30 June 2027)
—	FW	BEL	Cyril Ngonge (at Monza until 30 June 2027)
—	FW	ITA	Emanuele Rao (at Pisa until 30 June 2027)
—	FW	POR	Dinis Rodrigues (at Eldense until 30 June 2027)
—	FW	ITA	Lorenzo Sgarbi (at Sambenedettese until 30 June 2027)
—	FW	ITA	Gianluca Vigliotti (at Pineto until 30 June 2027)

=== Retired numbers ===
Jersey number 10, retired in 2000 as a tribute to Diego Maradona

Note: Flags indicate national team as defined under FIFA eligibility rules; some limited exceptions apply. Players may hold more than one non-FIFA nationality.

No.	Pos.	Nation	Player
10	FW	ARG	Diego Maradona (1984–1991)

In the summer of 2000, Napoli retired the jersey number 10 belonging to former club legend Diego Maradona, who played for the club from 1984 to 1991. Since the adoption of persistent squad numbers with players names printed on the jersey, the last players to wear the number 10 were Fausto Pizzi (in 1995–1996), Beto (in 1996–1997), Igor Protti (in 1997–1998) who was the last player to play and score a goal with the number 10 shirt in Serie A and Claudio Bellucci (from 1998 to 2000 in Serie B).

However, for regulatory reasons, the number was reissued from 2004 to 2006 in Serie C1, as at the time Italy's third level tournament still used the old numbering from 1 to 11, without printed names. The last player to wear and score goals with this shirt in an official match was Mariano Bogliacino in the home match of 18 May 2006 against Spezia, valid for the finals leg of the Supercoppa di Lega Serie C1; primacy belongs to him also for last appearance in the championship, 12 May 2006 at the home match against Lanciano. As regards exclusively the championship, however, the honour goes to the Argentine footballer Roberto Sosa, the distinction of being the last to wear the 10 at the San Paolo and at the same time to score in the match against Frosinone on 30 April 2006.

== Culture ==
=== Colours, badge and nicknames ===
As Naples is a coastal city, the colours of the club have always been derived from the blue waters of the Gulf of Naples. Originally, while using the name Naples FBC, the colours of the club implemented two shades of blue. However, since the 1920s, a singular blue tone has been used in the form of azure. Thus, Napoli share the nickname "Azzurri" with the Italy national team. The shade of blue has been sky blue in many instances.

Former badge used between 2007 and 2024

Napoli typically wear azure shirts with white shorts at home and white shirts with either white or blue shorts away, though in recent years the away kits have often deviated from this tradition.

One of the nicknames of Napoli is "I ciucci", which means "the donkeys" in the Neapolitan language. Napoli were given this name after a particularly poor performance during the 1926–27 season. It was originally meant to be derogatory, as the Neapolitan symbol is a rampant black horse, but the club adopted the donkey as a mascot named "'O Ciuccio".

Napoli's first badge featured a rampant horse on top of a football with the letters "ACN" around it. The current club badge features a large "N" placed within a circle. This crest can be traced back to Internazionale Napoli, which used a similar design on their shirts. Since the club officially adopted the "N badge" as its representative, Napoli have altered it slightly at various times; sometimes it features the club's name around it, sometimes it does not. The main difference between each badge is the shade of blue used. Usually the "N" is white, although it has occasionally been gold (especially prior to 1980).

"Partenopei" is a popular nickname for the club and people from the city of Naples in general. It is derived from Greek mythology where the siren Parthenope tried to enchant Odysseus from his ship to Capri. In the story, Odysseus had his men tie him to the ship's mast so he was able to resist the song of the siren. Consequently, Parthenope, unable to live with the rejection of her love, drowned herself and her body was washed up upon the shore of Naples.

== Supporters and rivalries ==
=== Support ===
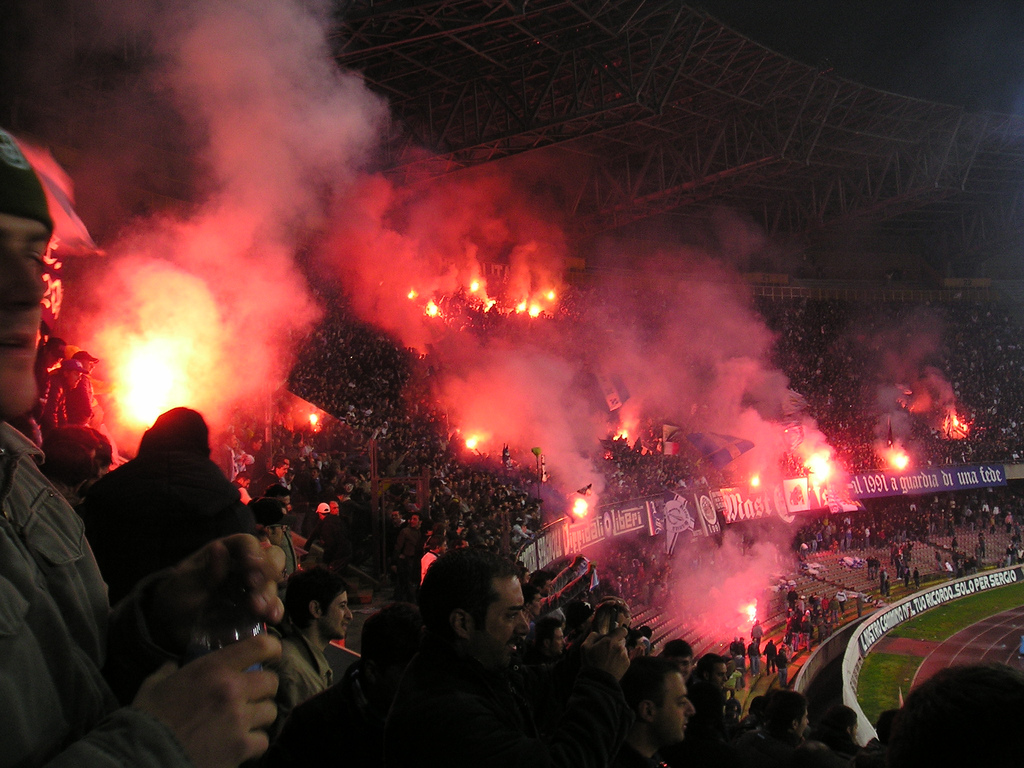
Napoli ultras at Stadio San Paolo

Napoli is the fourth most supported football club in Italy with around 13% of Italian football fans supporting the club. Like other top clubs in the country, Napoli's fanbase goes beyond the Italian border; in 2018, the society announced that the team had over 35 million supporters worldwide and 120 million people who liked to watch Napoli matches.

The main ultra groups of Napoli are Fedayn EAM 1979, Ultras Napoli, Fossato Flegreo, Secco Vive, Mastiffs, Brigata Carolina, Teste Matte, Sud1996, Nuova Guardia, Vecchi Lions and Masseria.

Napoli fans have occasionally cheered loud enough to register as earthquakes on seismographs at University of Naples Federico II.

In the morning we went to the San Paolo to warm up, Carlos (Tevez) was telling me about this stadium, but I've played for Barça so I said to myself, it can't be that big of a deal! Yet when I set foot on that pitch I felt something magical, different. In the evening, when there was the anthem of the Champions League, hearing 80,000 people whistling us I realized what a mess we were in! I did play some important matches in my career, but when I heard that cry for the first time my legs were shaking! Well, it was there that I realized that for those people this is not just a team, it is a visceral love, like the one between a mother and a son! It was the only time I remained on the pitch after losing a match, just to enjoy the show.

=== Rivalries ===
Unlike other Italian cities such as Genoa, Milan, Rome and Turin, Napoli is the only major football club in the city, and therefore there is no derby in the strict sense of the term. The now-infrequent derby with Savoia, the next largest club in Naples, was played for the first time on 24 December 1939, during the knockout phase of the 1939–40 Coppa Italia, the score was 1–3 in favour of Napoli. The last meeting between the clubs was in the Serie B in 2000, won 0–1 by Napoli.

Napoli's most hated rivals are Juventus. There is also a strong rivalry with Roma. Even though there used to be an official friendship between Napoli and AS Roma fans, particularly strong in the 70s and 80s and known as the Derby del Sole (Derby of the Sun), the friendship ended in 1987 and became a rivalry which got worse around 2001, and reached its peak after the 2014 Coppa Italia final, when a Roma fan shot and killed a Napoli fan named Ciro Esposito near the Stadio Olimpico. As Napoli is one of the most important clubs in Southern Italy, they share many rivalries with clubs in the north, like Milan, Internazionale, Fiorentina, Atalanta and Hellas Verona. Napoli fans also have a fierce rivalry with the other Roman club Lazio, and contest the Derby del Mezzogiorno (Midday Derby/Derby of Southern Italy) against Bari and Derby Bourbon (referencing the family that ruled the Kingdom of the Two Sicilies) against Foggia.

The Derby del Sud Italia (Derby of Southern Italy) against Catanzaro was considered one of the most important rivalries in Italy during the 1970s.

The fans of Napoli recognise two additional regional derbies: Derby della Campania generally refers to a rivalry with regional clubs, mainly Avellino and Salernitana.

=== Friendships ===
A "friendly rivalry" with Palermo is contested, known as the Derby delle Due Sicilie (Derby of the Two Sicilies), in reference to the historical link of the former Kingdom of Two Sicilies. Another friendly rivalry exists with Catania known as the Derby del Vulcano (Volcano Derby), referencing Mount Vesuvius near Naples and Mount Etna near Catania. A friendship also exists with Juve Stabia.

Friendships with teams outside Italy exist with Borussia Dortmund, Celtic, Lokomotiv Plovdiv, Paris Saint-Germain, and Red Star Belgrade. The club's fans also has a fondness for the Oltean club Universitatea Craiova, due to the regional similarities of the supporters.

Napoli formerly had a long-standing friendship with the fans of Genoa, but the friendship ended in 2019. Napoli also once had a friendship with Roma.

== Finances ==
SSC Napoli was expelled from the professional league in 2004. Thanks to Article 52 of NOIF, the sports title was transferred to Napoli Soccer (later the "new" Napoli) in the same year, while the corporate entity which administered the "old" Napoli was liquidated. In the second last season before bankruptcy, the club was partially saved by the non-standard accounting practice of amortization after Silvio Berlusconi, owner of Milan and Prime Minister of Italy, introduced Italian Law 91/1981, Article 18B.

Since re-foundation in 2004, the club's large numbers of supporters provided the main source of income, particularly through gate revenues and TV rights. Napoli made an aggregate profit in 2006–07 Serie B. They have continued to be profitable since returning to Serie A. Napoli equity in 2005 was a negative €261,466, having started from €3 million capital. By 2010 the equity was at €25,107,223 and Napoli achieved self-sustainability.

S.S.C. Napoli S.p.A.separate financial statements
Year	Turnover	Result	Total Assets	Net Assets	Re-capitalization
S.S.C. Napoli S.p.A. (P.I. 03486600632) exchange rate €1 = L1936.27
1999–2000 Serie B	€25,120,308*#	€203,378*	€111,556,811*	€5,952,921*	
2000–01 Serie A	▲€54,966,464*#	▼ (€2,036,451)*	▲€154,624,699*	▼€3,896,132*	€0
2001–02 Serie B	▼€21,183,736*#	▼ (€28,856,093)*	▼€92,721,662*	▼ (€2,166,997)*	▲ ~€22.8 million
2002–03 Serie B	▼€20,428,522*#	▲ (€13,754,506)*¶	▼€67,994,171*¶	▲ (€966,735)*¶	▼ ~€15 million
2003–04 Serie B	Not available due to bankruptcy				
S.S.C. Napoli S.p.A. (P.I. 04855461218) startup capital: €3 million**
2004–05 Serie C1	€11,174,000	(€7,061,463)	▲€37,117,126	▼ (€261,466)	€3,800,000
2005–06 Serie C1	▲€12,068,630	▼ (€9,088,780)	▲€37,299,498	▲€211,220	▲€9,561,466
2006–07 Serie B	▲€41,411,837	▲€1,419,976	▲€47,917,274	▲€1,916,975	▼€288,780
2007–08 Serie A	▲€88,428,490	▲€11,911,041	▲€86,244,038	▲€13,829,015	▼€1,000
2008–09 Serie A	▲€108,211,134	▼€10,934,520	▼€81,199,725	▲€24,763,537	▼€0
2009–10 Serie A	▲€110,849,458	▼€343,686	▲€117,237,581	▲€25,107,223	€0
2010–11 Serie A	▲€131,476,940	▲€4,197,829	▼€110,053,332	▲€29,305,052	€0
2011–12 Serie A	▲€155,929,550	▲€14,720,757	▲€138,168,981	▲€44,025,810	€0
2012–13 Serie A	▼€151,922,436	▼€8,073,447	▼€136,748,114	▲€52,099,258	€0
2013–14 Serie A	▲€237,034,664	▲€20,217,304	▲€215,764,185	▲€72,316,563	€0
2014–15 Serie A		▼ (€13.1m)			
2015–16 Serie A		▲ (€3.2m)			
2016–17 Serie A		▲€66.6m			
2017–18 Serie A		▼ (€6.4m)			
2018–19 Serie A	€216.6m	▲€29.2m			
2019–20 Serie A	▼€178.9m	▼ (€19.0m)			
2020–21 Serie A	▲€179.4m	▼ (€58.9m)			
2021–22 Serie A	▼€165.2m	▲ (€52.0m)			
2022–23 Serie A	▲€359.2m	▲€79.7m			
2023–24 Serie A	▼€328.2m	▼€63.0m			

=== Kit suppliers and shirt sponsors ===
Period	Kit manufacturer	Front sponsor(s)	Back sponsor	Sleeve sponsor	Notes
1926–78	In-house	None	None	None	
1978–80	Puma	None	None	None	
1980–81	NR (Ennerre)	None	None	None	
1981–82	NR (Ennerre)	Snaidero	None	None	
1982–83	NR (Ennerre)	Cirio	None	None	
1983–84	NR (Ennerre)	Latte Berna	None	None	
1984–85	Linea Time	Cirio	None	None	
1985–88	NR (Ennerre)	Buitoni	None	None	
1988–91	NR (Ennerre)	Mars	None	None	
1991–94	Umbro	Voiello	None	None	
1994–96	Lotto	Record Cucine	None	None	
1996–97	Lotto	Centrale del Latte di Napoli	None	None	
1997–99	Nike	Polenghi	None	None	
1999–2000	Nike	Peroni	None	None	
2000–03	Diadora	Peroni	None	None	
2003–04	Legea	Russo Cicciano	None	None	
2004–05	Kappa	None (matches 1–7) / various Filmauro films (matches 8–23) (Note: Sky Captain (matches 8–11) / Christmas in Love (matches 12–19) / Manuale d'amore (matches 19–23)) / Mandi (match 24 – end of season)	None	None	
2005–06	Kappa	Lete	None	None	
2006–09	Diadora	Lete	None	None	
2009–11	Macron	Lete	None	None	
2011–14	Macron	Lete / MSC Cruises	None	None	European competitions Lete only
2014–16	Macron	Lete / Pasta Garofalo	None	None	European competitions Lete only
2016–19	Kappa	Lete / Pasta Garofalo	Kimbo	None	European competitions Lete only
2019–21	Kappa	Lete / MSC Cruises	Kimbo	None	European competitions Lete only
2021–23	EA7	Lete / MSC Cruises	Floki Inu	Amazon	European competitions Lete and Amazon only
2023–24	EA7	MSC Cruises	Upbit	eBay	European competitions MSC Cruises and eBay only
2024–present	EA7	MSC Cruises	Sorgesana	None	

== Stature and statistics ==
=== League history ===
- 1926–1929 Divisione Nazionale (1st tier)
- 1929–1942 Serie A (1st tier)
- 1942–1943 Serie B (2nd tier)
- 1943–1946 No contests (World War II)
- 1946–1948 Serie A (1st tier)
- 1948–1950 Serie B (2nd tier) – Champions: 1950
- 1950–1961 Serie A (1st tier)
- 1961–1962 Serie B (2nd tier)
- 1962–1963 Serie A (1st tier)
- 1963–1965 Serie B (2nd tier)
- 1965–1998 Serie A (1st tier) – Champions: 1987, 1990
- 1998–2000 Serie B (2nd tier)
- 2000–2001 Serie A (1st tier)
- 2001–2004 Serie B (2nd tier)
- 2004–2006 Serie C1 (3rd tier) – Champions: 2006
- 2006–2007 Serie B (2nd tier)
- 2007–present Serie A (1st tier) – Champions: 2023, 2025

== Honours ==
Type	Competition	Titles	Seasons
Domestic	Serie A	4	1986–87, 1989–90, 2022–23, 2024–25
Domestic	Coppa Italia	6	1961–62, 1975–76, 1986–87, 2011–12, 2013–14, 2019–20
Domestic	Supercoppa Italiana	3	1990, 2014, 2025–26
Continental	UEFA Cup	1	1988–89

=== Other titles ===
- Coppa delle Alpi
  - Winners: 1966
- Anglo-Italian League Cup
  - Winners: 1976
- Central and Southern Italy Serie A-B Championship
  - Winners: 1945–46
- Serie B
  - Winners: 1949–50
- Serie C1
  - Winners: 2005–06 (Group B)

== UEFA club coefficient ranking ==
As of 11 January 2026

Rank	Team	Points
28	(France) Lille	64.000
29	(Spain) Real Betis	62.250
30	(Italy) Napoli	62.000
31	(Germany) RB Leipzig	61.000
32	(Spain) Villarreal	59.000

== Records and statistics ==
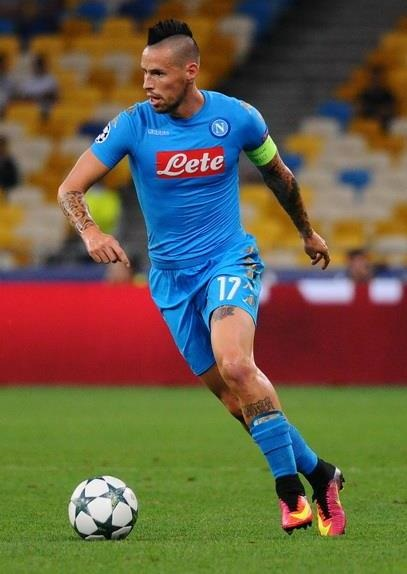
Marek Hamšík is Napoli's record appearance holder.

Marek Hamšík holds Napoli's official appearance record, having made 520. He also holds the record for league appearances with 408 over the course of 12 years from 2007 to 2019.

The all-time leading goal scorer for Napoli is Dries Mertens, with 148 goals. He also holds the record for league goals with 113.

Diego Maradona finished the season of Serie A as the league's top scorer, known in Italy as the Capocannoniere, in the 1987–88 season with 15 goals. This achievement was matched by Edinson Cavani in 2012–13, Gonzalo Higuaín in 2015–16, and Victor Osimhen in 2022–23.

The record for most goals in a single league season belongs to Gonzalo Higuaín, with 36 in the 2015–16 Serie A.

The biggest ever victory recorded by Napoli was 8–1 against Pro Patria, in the 1955–56 season of Serie A. Napoli's heaviest championship defeat came during the 1927–28 season when eventual champions Torino beat them 11–0.

On 26 July 2016, Gonzalo Higuaín became the third-highest football transfer of all-time and highest ever transfer for an Italian club when he joined Juventus for €90 million.

On 31 July 2020, Napoli confirmed the signing of Victor Osimhen from Lille for a transfer fee of €70 million, making him Napoli's most expensive signing of its history.

== See also ==
- European Club Association
- Napoli (futsal)
- SSD Napoli Femminile
