= AS Gubbio 1910 =

Italian football club

Gubbio
- Full name: Associazione Sportiva Gubbio 1910 Srl
- Nicknames: Lupi (Wolves); Rossoblù (Red-Blue)
- Founded: 1910
- Ground: Stadio Pietro Barbetti, Gubbio, Italy
- Capacity: 5,300
- Chairman: Sauro Notari
- Head coach: Piero Braglia
- League: Serie C Group B
- 2025–26: Serie C Group B, 8th of 20
- Website: http://www.asgubbio1910.net/
Home colours	Away colours

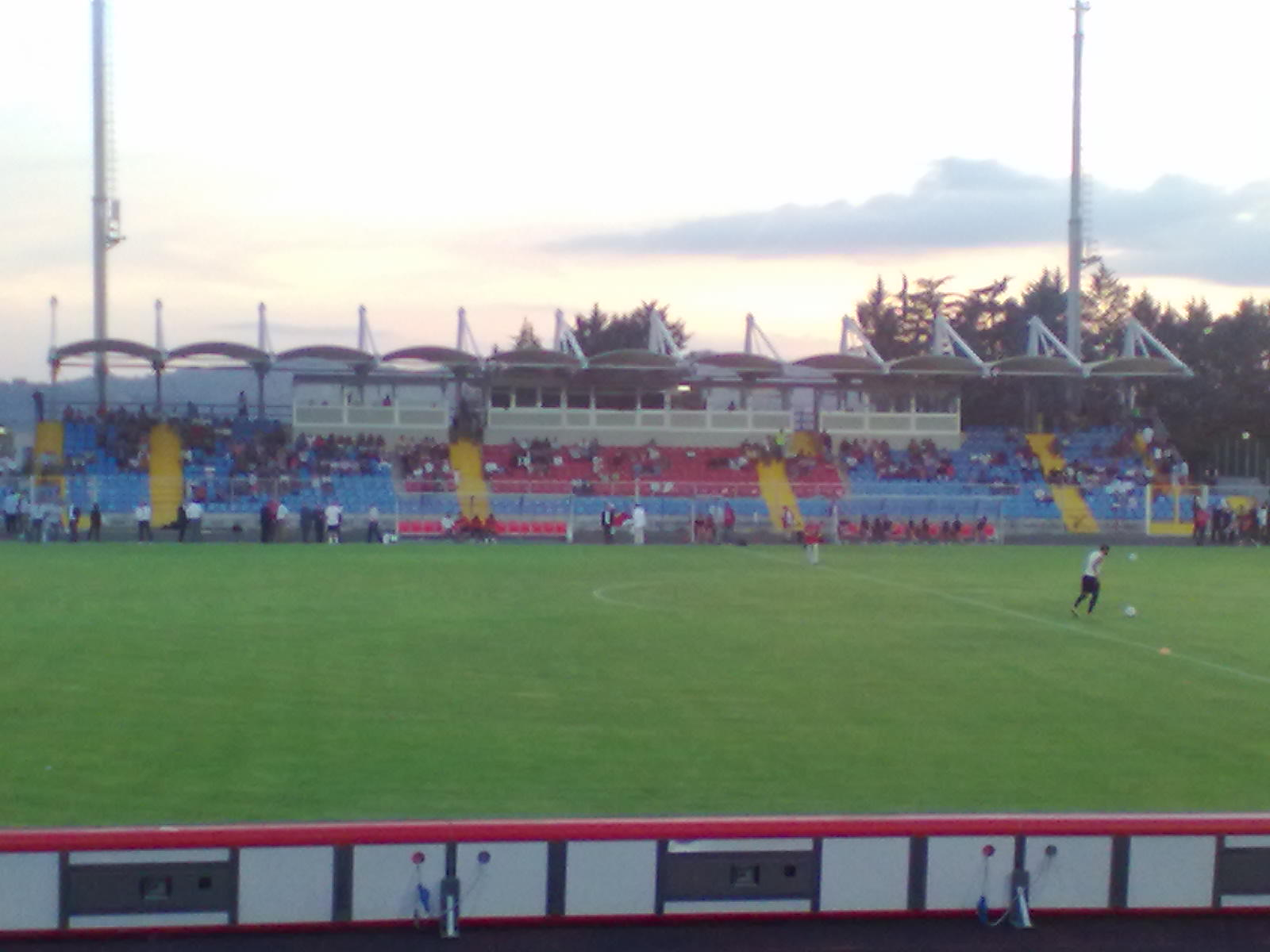
Stadio Pietro Barbetti, home venue of AS Gubbio 1910

Associazione Sportiva Gubbio 1910 is an Italian association football club, based in Gubbio, Umbria. The club play in Serie C, the third tier of Italian football.

== History ==
The multi-sport club SPES Gubbio was founded in 1908. In 1910 SPES Gubbio began its football activity, and the official football sector was established on 25 March 1913.

In February 2009, the club made national headlines by hiring 70-year-old UEFA Cup-winning coach Luigi Simoni as technical director (due to age limits), with former under-19 team boss Riccardo Tumiatti being promoted as first team coach. In the season 2010–11 Lega Pro Prima Divisione season the club won promotion to Serie B after 63 years, under the guidance of Vincenzo Torrente (as appointed by Simoni himself). However, Gubbio's stay in the second tier of Italian football lasted only one season as they were immediately relegated back to Lega Pro Prima Divisione.

== Colours and stadium ==
The team's colours are dark blue and red.

Their home field is the Stadio Pietro Barbetti, a 5,300 capacity all-seater stadium.

== Current squad ==
As of 10 September 2026

Note: Flags indicate national team as defined under FIFA eligibility rules; some limited exceptions apply. Players may hold more than one non-FIFA nationality.

No.	Pos.	Nation	Player
1	GK	ITA	Nicola Bagnolini (on loan from Bologna)
3	DF	ITA	Edoardo Meconi (on loan from Genoa)
4	DF	ITA	Leonardo Baroncelli
6	DF	FRA	Oumar Barry
7	FW	ITA	Marco Spina
8	MF	ITA	Giacomo Rosaia
9	FW	ITA	Manuel Cesari
10	FW	ITA	Andrea La Mantia
11	MF	ITA	Marco Pinato
12	GK	ITA	Luca Barbanera
14	MF	ITA	Alessandro Cardascio
15	DF	ITA	Andrea Signorini
17	DF	ITA	Nicolò Fazzi
21	DF	ITA	Bruno Zorzetto

No.	Pos.	Nation	Player
22	GK	ITA	Leonardo Marson
24	MF	ITA	Lorenzo Piomboni
26	FW	ITA	Klaudio Toska
27	DF	ITA	Lorenzo Podda
33	DF	ITA	Matteo Santamaria
34	DF	ITA	Francesco Zallu
47	MF	ITA	Giovanni Di Noia
67	MF	ITA	Federico Carraro
70	DF	ITA	Manuel Ferrini
73	FW	ITA	Tommaso Ghirardello
76	DF	ITA	Luca Barani (on loan from Sassuolo)
77	FW	GHA	Amoako Minta (on loan from Sassuolo)
81	FW	ITA	Giacomo Beretta
92	MF	ITA	Enrico Baldini

=== Out on loan ===
Note: Flags indicate national team as defined under FIFA eligibility rules; some limited exceptions apply. Players may hold more than one non-FIFA nationality.

No.	Pos.	Nation	Player
—	FW	ITA	Nicholas Becciolotti (at Tavernelle until 30 June 2027)
