= Vincenzo Torrente =

Italian footballer and manager

Personal information
- Date of birth: 12 February 1966 (age 60)
- Place of birth: Cetara, Salerno, Italy
- Position: Centre-back

Senior career*
Years	Team	Apps	(Gls)
1982–1985	Nocerina	9	(0)
1985–2000	Genoa	412	(5)
2000–2001	Alessandria	21	(0)

Managerial career
- 2002: Genoa (caretaker)
- 2009–2011: Gubbio
- 2011–2013: Bari
- 2013–2014: Cremonese
- 2015–2016: Salernitana
- 2017: Vicenza
- 2018–2019: Sicula Leonzio
- 2019–2022: Gubbio
- 2022–2024: Padova
- 2025: Trapani
- * Club domestic league appearances and goals

Vincenzo Torrente (born 12 February 1966) is an Italian football coach and former player.

== Playing career ==
After starting his career at minor league club Nocerina, Torrente joined Genoa at the age of 19. A centre-back, he quickly became a mainstay for the club, spending 15 consecutive seasons with the Rossoblu at both Serie A and Serie B levels, also playing at the European level during the Osvaldo Bagnoli period in the early 1990s. He left Genoa in 2000 after collecting more than 400 games with the club to join Alessandria, where he ended his career in 2011 at the age of 35.

== Coaching career ==
After retirement, Torrente became a coach and promptly returned to Genoa, heading the Allievi Nazionali (under-17 youth squad). Later in 2002, he was appointed as caretaker coach together with Rino Lavezzini in what turned out to be a troublesome season that ultimately ended in relegation (then annulled due to the so-called Caso Catania) for the club. He then returned to working as a youth coach for Genoa until 2009, when his former boss Luigi Simoni offered him a head coaching post at Lega Pro Seconda Divisione club Gubbio. Under his two-year tenure, Gubbio achieved a surprising feat of two consecutive promotions, thus reaching Serie B in June 2011 as league champions. In June 2011, he left Gubbio to become the new head coach at Bari, again at the Serie B level.

On 13 December 2018, he signed with Serie C club Sicula Leonzio. He left Sicula Leonzio at the end of the 2018–19 season.

On 16 October 2019, he returned to the club he had the most success with, Gubbio, now in the Serie C. After three positive seasons in charge of Gubbio, on 17 June 2022 the club terminated Torrente's contract.

On 13 December 2022, Torrente was hired as the new head coach of Serie C club Padova. He was dismissed on 8 April 2024 after failing to win automatic promotion with his club for two consecutive seasons, with Massimo Oddo being appointed to replace him for the playoff phase.

On 30 January 2025, Torrente was hired as the new head coach of Serie C club Trapani. He was dismissed two months later, on 30 March 2025, following a string of six consecutive losses.
