= Simone Russini =

Italian footballer

Simeone Russini
Personal information
- Date of birth: 20 March 1996 (age 30)
- Place of birth: Naples, Italy
- Height: 1.70 m (5 ft 7 in)
- Position: Forward

Youth career
- Amici di Mugnano
- 2011–2013: Ternana
- 2013–2015: Juventus
- 2013–2015: → Ternana (loan)

Senior career*
Years	Team	Apps	(Gls)
2015	Juventus	0	(0)
2015	→ Paganese (loan)	10	(1)
2015–2016	Ternana	0	(0)
2015–2016	→ Lumezzane (loan)	23	(3)
2016–2018	Alessandria	22	(1)
2016–2017	→ Lumezzane (loan)	29	(0)
2018–2019	Siracusa	18	(0)
2019–2021	Cesena	51	(7)
2021–2022	Catania	30	(7)
2022–2026	Padova	60	(7)
- * Club domestic league appearances and goals as of 8 May 2026

Simone Russini (born 20 March 1996) is an Italian footballer who plays as a left winger.

== Club career ==
Born in Naples, Campania, Russini started his career at Amici di Mugnano youth academy.

=== Ternana ===
Russini joined Umbrian side Ternana in 2011, along with Antonio Palumbo. Russini was the top-scorer for their under-17 team in 2012–13 season, despite few goals behind the league topscorer. The team finished as the fifth of Group C, failing to qualify to the playoffs.

=== Juventus ===
On 10 July 2013 half of the registration rights of Russini was signed by Serie A giant Juventus for €650,000, as part of Alberto Masi's deal to Ternana, for €2 million. Russini signed a three-year contract. He was immediately loaned back to Ternana, which was extended in 2014–15 season. Russini left Juventus on 25 June 2015 without any appearance.

=== Ternana (loan) ===
Despite a player for their under-19 team, Russini also received no.27 shirt from the first team of Ternana Calcio. Russini was a player for the first team in 2013 pre-season friendly. In June 2014 the co-ownerships of Masi and Russini were renewed. Russini also returned to Ternana for 2014–15 Serie B season.

=== Paganese (loan) ===
On 2 February 2015 Russini joined Lega Pro club Paganese on a temporary deal.

=== Ternana return ===
In June 2015 Juventus sold Russini back to Ternana for €150,000 (reduced €500,000). Ternana also acquired Masi outright for €1.5 million (also discounted €500,000) on 2 February, using the transfer fee from selling Alberto Brignoli to Juventus for €1.75 million on the same day.

On 31 August 2015 Russini was signed by the third-tier side Lumezzane on a temporary deal.

=== Alessandria ===
On 31 August 2016 Russini was signed by Alessandria on a 3-year contract. He was immediately farmed to fellow Lega Pro club Lumezzane. Russini returned to Alessandria and was assigned number 20 shirt on 1 September 2017.

=== Siracusa ===
On 1 November 2018, he signed with Siracusa.

=== Cesena ===
On 7 July 2019, he joined Cesena on a two-year contract.

=== Catania ===
On 21 July 2021, he signed with Catania on a two-year contract.

On 9 April 2022, he was released together with all of his Catania teammates following the club's exclusion from Italian football due to its inability to overcome a number of financial issues.

=== Padova ===
On 5 July 2022, Russini joined Padova on a two-year contract.

== Personal life ==
On 29 January 2021 he tested positive for COVID-19.
