= Rino Lavezzini =

Italian footballer

Personal information
- Date of birth: 20 February 1952 (age 74)
- Place of birth: Fidenza, Italy

Managerial career
- Years: Team
- 1985–1986: Badia Polesine
- 1986–1987: Soragna
- 1989–1988: Fiorenzuola (youth)
- 1988–1989: Fidenza (youth)
- 1989–1991: Parma (youth)
- 1991–1993: Montevarchi
- 1993–1994: Carrarese
- 1995: Giorgione
- 1995–1996: Pontedera
- 1996–Mar 1997: Catanzaro
- May–Jun 1997: Catanzaro
- 1997–1998: Massese
- 1998–2000: Mantova
- 2000: Viareggio
- 2001: Viareggio
- 2001–2002: Poggese
- 2002–2003: Genoa
- 2003–2004: Genoa (youth)
- 2005: Sūduva
- 2005: Lavagnese
- 2006: Petrolul Ploiești
- 2007–2008: Livorno (youth)
- 2008–2009: Carrarese (director of sports)
- Jan–Jun 2009: Carrarese
- Nov 2009–2010: Carrarese
- 2010–2011: Vicenza (youth)
- 2015–2016: Padova (assistant)
- 2019: Albissola

Rino Lavezzini (born 20 February 1952) is an Italian football manager. He notably managed Genoa C.F.C. and also had spells in Lithuania and Romania.
