= Luigi Simoni =

Italian footballer, manager, and official (1939–2020)

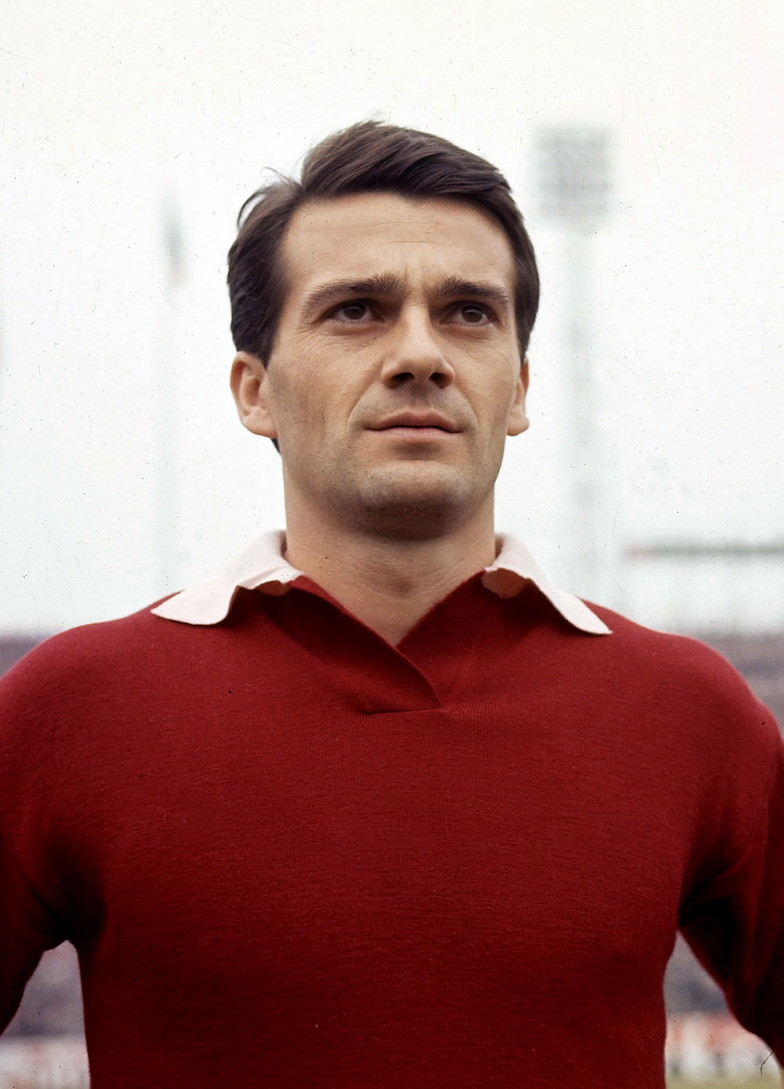
- Simoni with Torino in the mid-1960s

Personal information
- Date of birth: 22 January 1939
- Place of birth: Crevalcore, Italy
- Date of death: 22 May 2020 (aged 81)
- Place of death: Pisa, Italy
- Height: 1.73 m (5 ft 8 in)
- Position: Attacking midfielder

Youth career
- Fiorentina

Senior career*
Years	Team	Apps	(Gls)
1959–1961	Mantova	47	(10)
1961–1962	Napoli	11	(1)
1962–1964	Mantova	48	(8)
1964–1967	Torino	81	(18)
1967–1968	Juventus	11	(0)
1968–1971	Brescia	100	(12)
1971–1974	Genoa	88	(13)
Total		386	(62)

Managerial career
- 1974–1978: Genoa
- 1978–1980: Brescia
- 1980–1984: Genoa
- 1984–1985: Pisa
- 1985–1986: Lazio
- 1986–1987: Pisa
- 1987–1988: Genoa
- 1988–1989: Empoli
- 1989–1990: Cosenza
- 1990–1992: Carrarese
- 1992–1996: Cremonese
- 1996–1997: Napoli
- 1997–1998: Inter Milan
- 1999–2000: Piacenza
- 2000–2001: Torino
- 2001–2002: CSKA Sofia
- 2002–2003: Ancona
- 2003–2004: Napoli
- 2004–2005: Siena
- 2005–2006: Lucchese
- 2011–2012: Gubbio (caretaker)
- * Club domestic league appearances and goals

Luigi "Gigi" Simoni (22 January 1939 – 22 May 2020) was an Italian football official, player and manager. A skilled tactician, as a coach Simoni enjoyed notable success in earning promotion from Serie B to Serie A with the teams he managed, a feat he achieved seven times with five different clubs.

He is best-known, however, for his brief but important stint as manager of Inter Milan (1997–98), where he won the UEFA Cup in 1998 and came close to conquering the scudetto, losing out to Juventus; this was the only time where Ronaldo was fully fit during his Inter spell, with Simoni making full use of the Brazilian's abilities.

== Early life ==
Luigi Simoni was born in Crevalcore, Emilia-Romagna, in Italy.

== Career ==
Simoni played as an attacking midfielder for Mantova, Napoli, Torino, Juventus, Brescia and Genoa. He won the Coppa Italia in 1961–62 with Napoli.

He started his managerial career with Genoa, in the 1974–75 season. The next year, he was able to bring the rossoblu back to Serie A.

After a long series of promotions, with Pisa, Brescia and Cremonese among them, and good results with outsider teams (Cremonese again, and Napoli), Simoni was called by Massimo Moratti to coach Inter Milan in 1997. With an in-form Ronaldo on his side, Simoni won the UEFA Cup over Lazio in 1998, and managed a second-place finish in Serie A, behind Juventus.

The following season, Simoni was fired by Inter Milan on 30 November 1998, although he was still appreciated and well-remembered by the team's fans.

After a few other experiences, including Piacenza, Torino, and a brief disappointing spell in Bulgaria with CSKA Sofia, Gigi Simoni led Ancona Calcio to Serie A in 2003, but was surprisingly fired before the start of the new season. His Serie A comeback, in 2004, with Siena, was not a particularly good one, however, as he was fired once again during the course of the season. In late 2005, Simoni took the head coaching role of Serie C1 team Lucchese, but with little success.

In February 2009, at the age of 70, Simoni accepted a job at Lega Pro Seconda Divisione's Gubbio, where he would serve as technical director until the end of the season. He was later confirmed to his role also for the 2009–10 season, with former Genoa defender Vincenzo Torrente acting as "on-pitch" head coach. Under the guidance of Simoni and Torrente, Gubbio ensured a historic promotion to Serie B that year; after Torrente decided to accept an offer from Bari, Simoni and Gubbio agreed to appoint Fabio Pecchia as new head coach.
Pecchia's term as Gubbio boss turned out however unsuccessful, and on 18 October 2011 Simoni agreed to serve as caretaker head coach for a Serie B game against his former club, league toppers Torino. The game ended in a surprising 1–0 win for his side, and led the club to keep Simoni in charge as long as a valid replacement coach would be found. The following two games led Gubbio to win four more points, a draw and a win. He guided the team until 20 March 2012, when he handed over his first team duties to assistant coach Marco Alessandrini, and moving back to his previous role of technical director at Gubbio.

== Illness and death ==
On 22 June 2019, Simoni suffered a stroke at his home, being in critical condition until his death on 22 May 2020, at the age of 81.

== Honours ==
=== Player ===
Napoli

- Coppa Italia: 1961–62

=== Manager ===
Cremonese

- Anglo-Italian Cup: 1992–93

Inter

- UEFA Cup: 1997–98

=== Individual ===
- Panchina d'Oro: 1997–98
- Italian Football Hall of Fame: 2021

== See also ==
- List of UEFA Cup winning managers
