= Nausauket, Rhode Island =

Neighborhood in Warwick, RI

Coordinates: 41°41′37″N 71°26′24″W

Nausauket, Rhode Island is a coastal neighborhood located in Warwick, Rhode Island, in the United States. Nausauket is bounded to the south by Greenwich Bay and to the west by Apponaug Cove. It is delimited by Buttonwoods to the east and Rhode Island Route 117 to the north. Nausauket is known for its waterfront recreation, calm and shallow shoreline, and abundant shellfish beds.

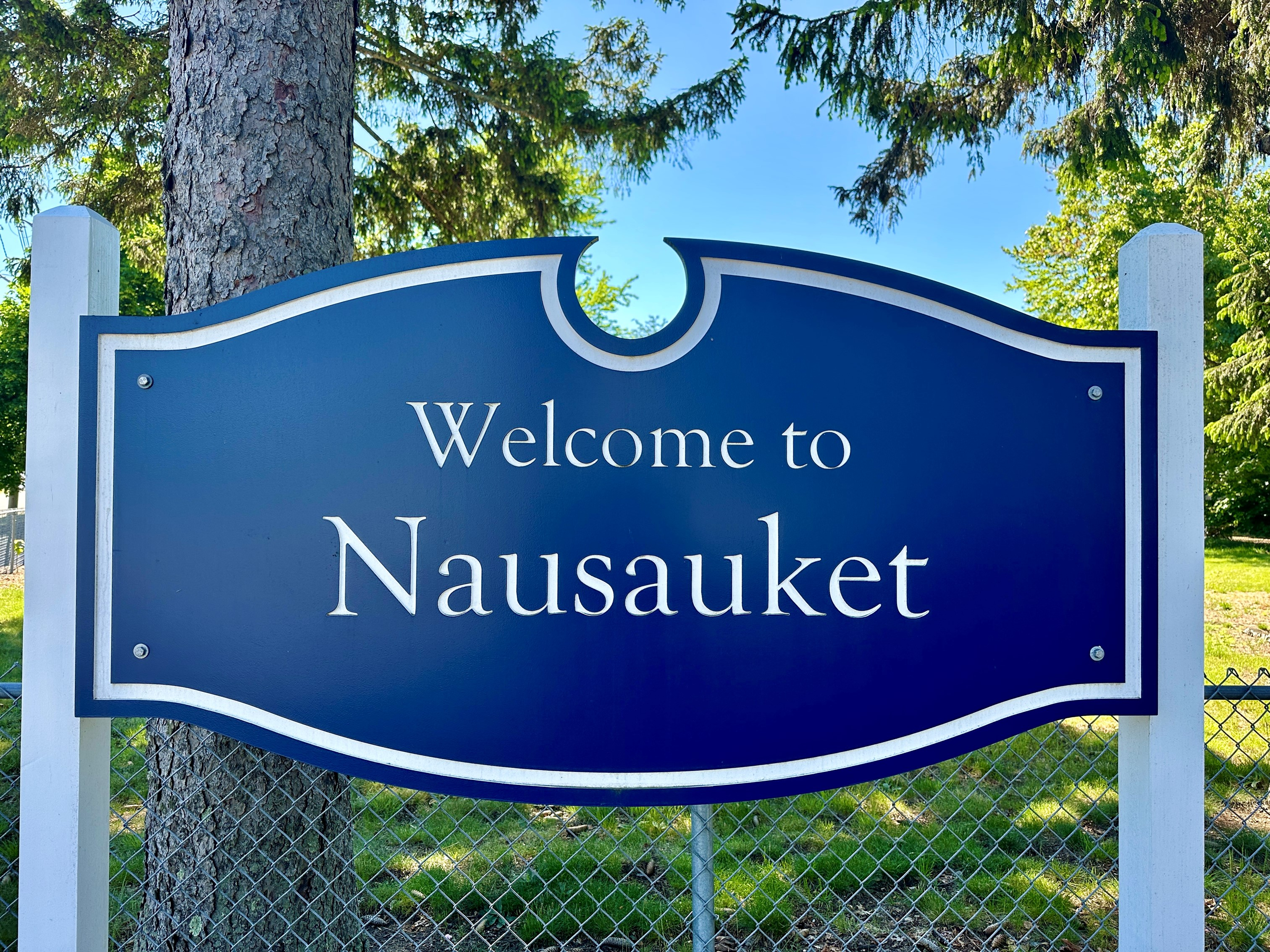
Nausauket Welcome Sign May 2025

== History ==
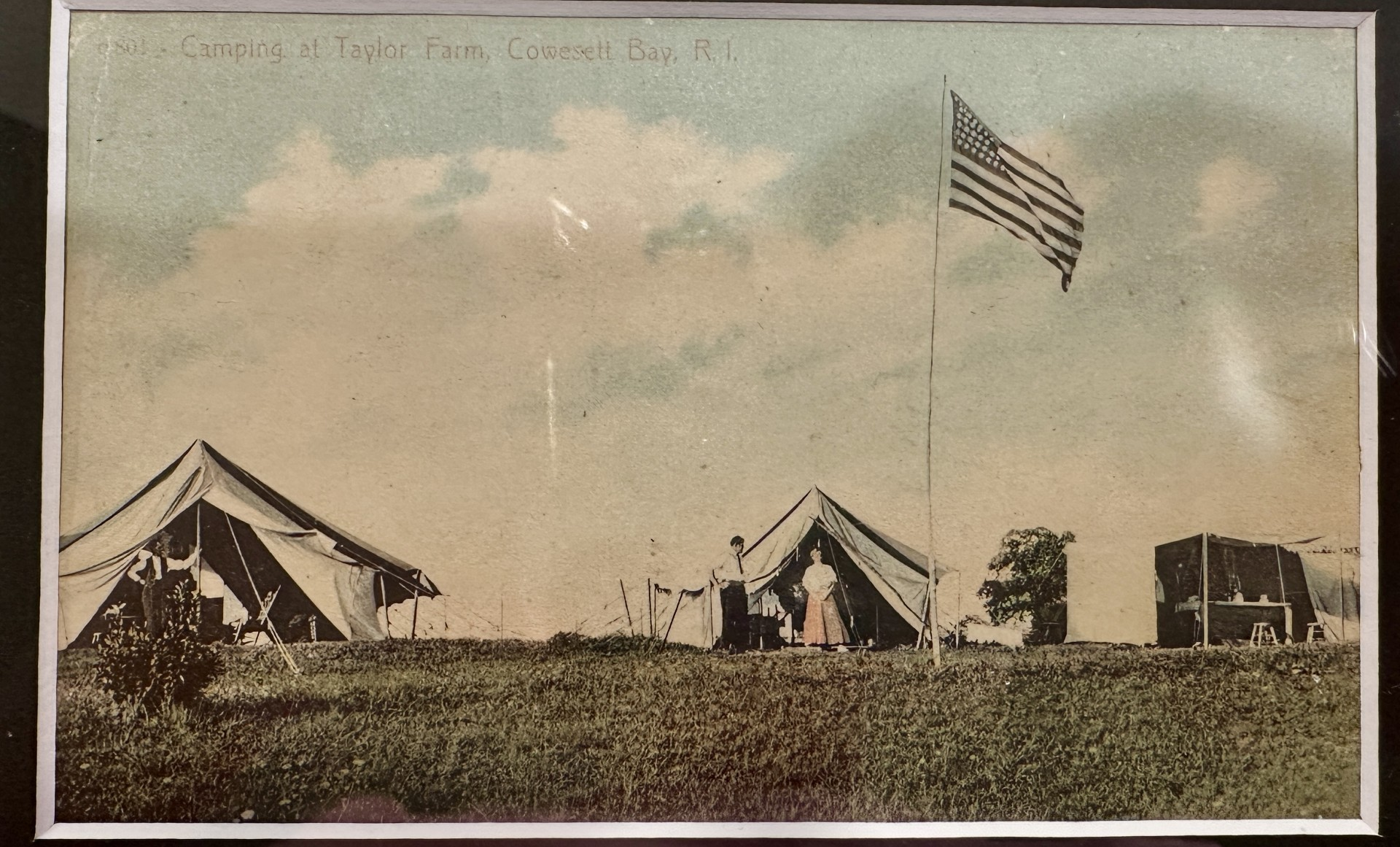
Camping at Taylor Farm postcard from 1911

The Nausauket area was originally settled by the sub-tribes of the Narragansett Indian Nation. The name "Nausauket" means "at the second outlet" or "between outlets" in the Narragansett language of the Narragansett people. The rich shellfish beds of Greenwich Bay and Apponaug Cove provided the earliest inhabitants with a plentiful food source of soft shell clams, quahogs and oysters.

In 1642, the area was purchased from the Narragansetts by a group of Englishmen (including Samuel Gorton). The sale encompassed 90 square miles of land in central Rhode Island and was known as the "Shawomet Purchase."

By the end of the 17th century, the land in Nausauket had been cultivated into farmland by European settlers. Taylor Farm, located on the south-western section of Nausauket, was one of the farms located there. On what was once Taylor Farm, just off present day Tiernan street, lies the Ambrose Taylor historical cemetery lot #106, which has 21 graves ranging from 1823 to 1907. Ambrose Taylor, for whom the cemetery is named, was one of the original members of the Pawtuxet Rangers. The farms in Nausauket were likely tenant farms, as most farms in Rhode Island operated in this manner. Given its close proximity to the ocean, the sandy soil was not ideal for growing crops. For additional sustenance, the settlers raised cattle and other livestock. The salt marsh grasses surrounding Baker Creek (originally known as Weeweonk or Waw-weonke creek) were used extensively as livestock feed during the harsh winters.

Around 1870, the area transitioned from farmland into a popular summer campground that existed until the 1910s. The campground provided spaces for families to pitch tents, with many using surplus army tents from the Civil War. Visitors to Nausauket came by steamboat or via horse-drawn station wagon from the Apponaug train station (formerly located at 3666 West Shore Road/Station Street). In 1885 a store was constructed at 478 Nausauket Rd to service the campground. It operated as Lewis Store in the 1920s, Smith's Grocery in the 1930s and 40's, then Green's Variety in the 1950s, followed by a news distributors office, eventually becoming a private residence, which still exists today.

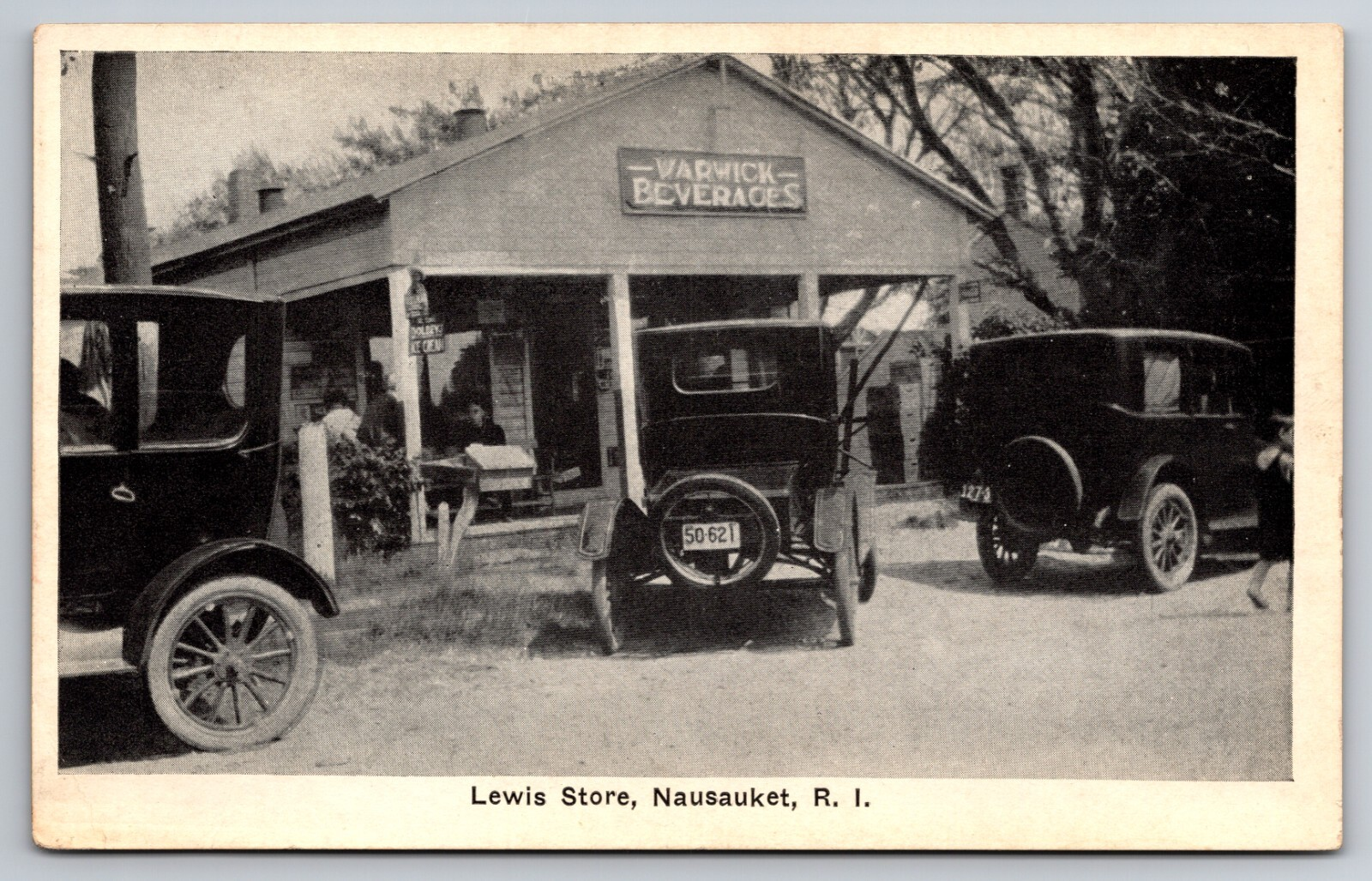
Lewis Store, Nausauket RI postcard from 1920

In addition to the campground, the farm house at Nausauket Farm (located across from Taylor farm, between Nausauket Road and Baker Creek, owned by Oliver Johnson) became a small hotel, Nausauket House, where guests could stay.

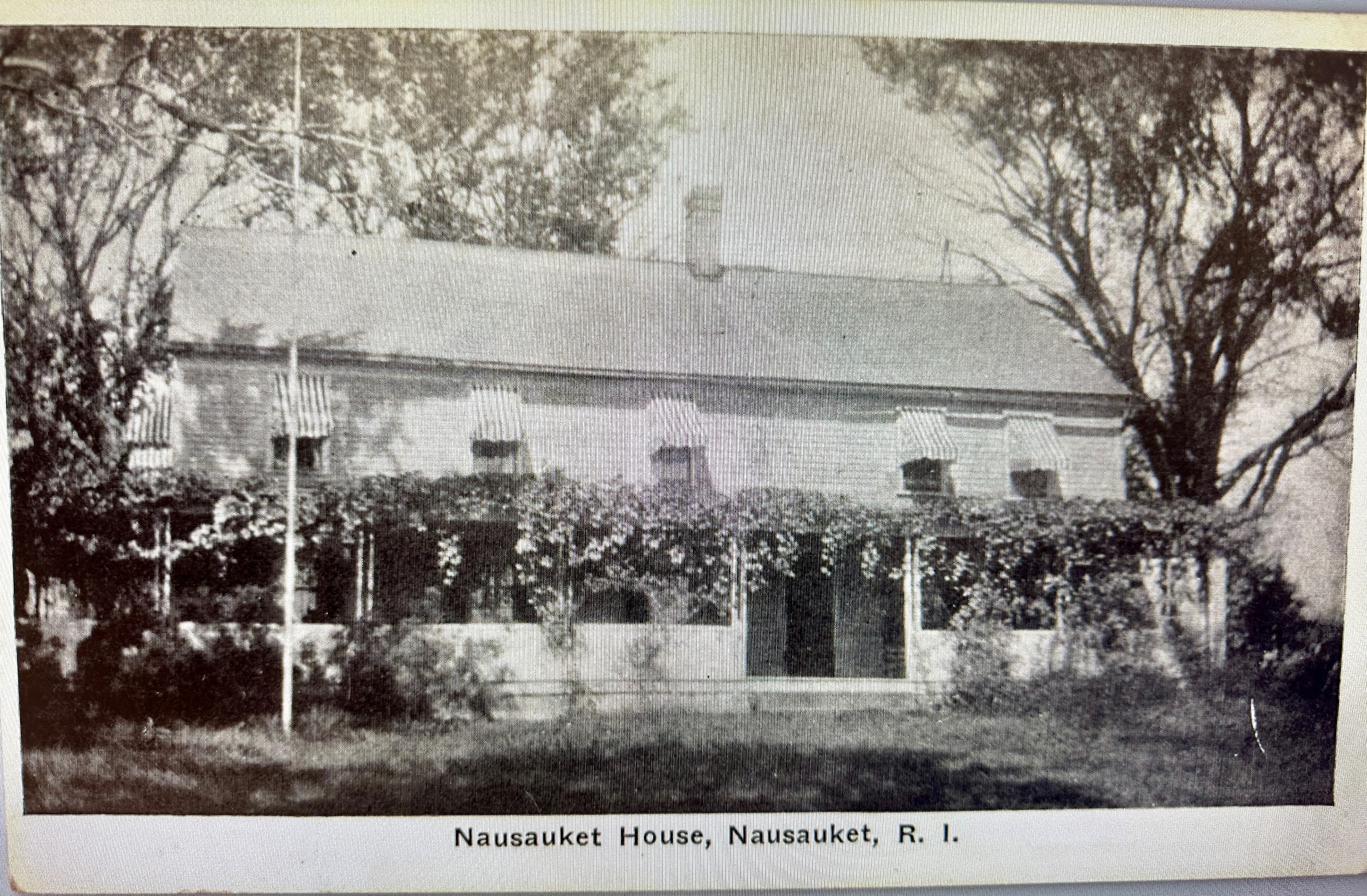
Nausauket House Inn postcard from 1910

Beginning in the early 1910s, the land was subdivided, sold and further developed. Many summer beach cottages were built during that time period. A map of Nausauket from 1922, from the Sanborn Fire Insurance shows some of the early street names.

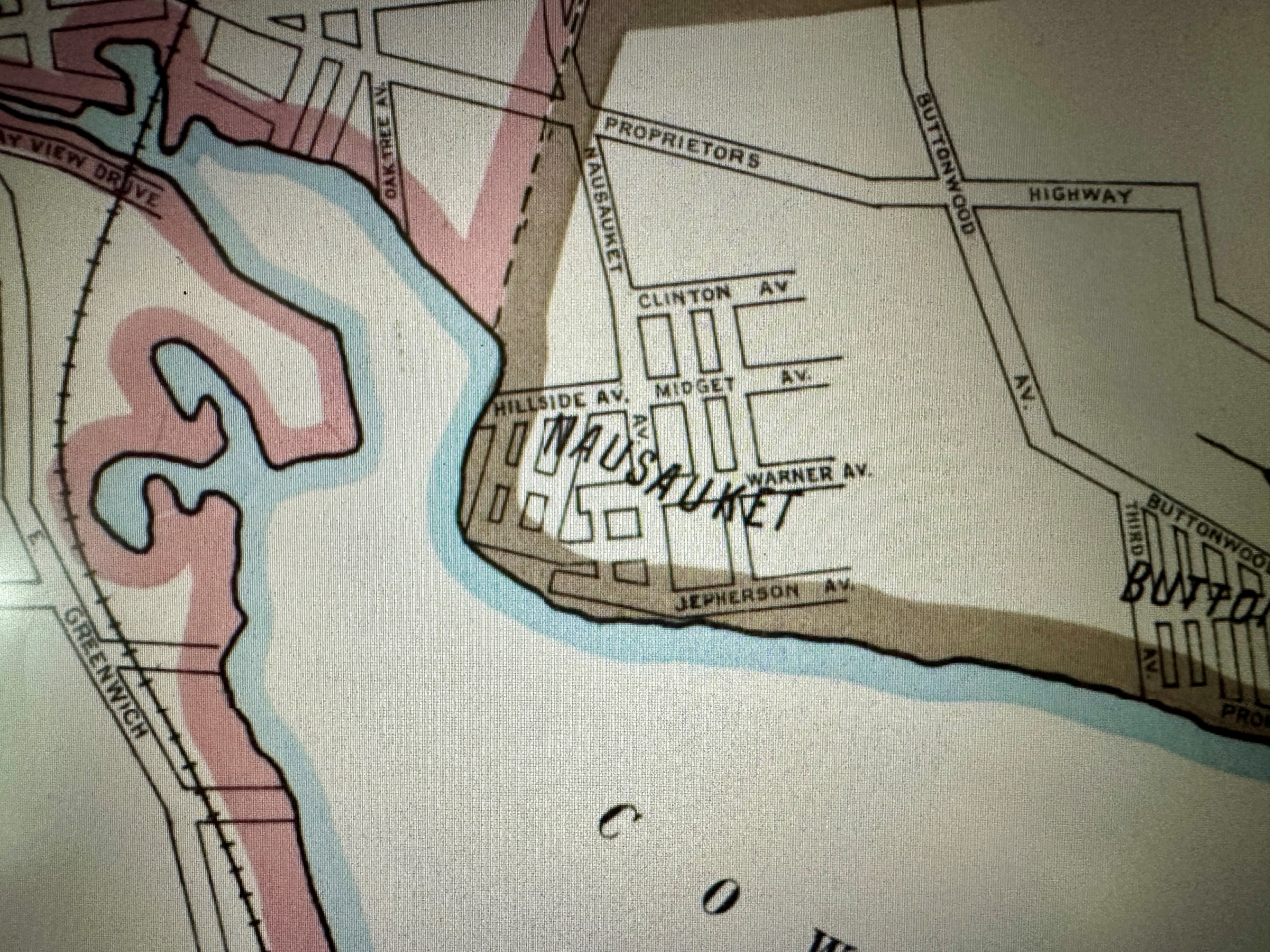
Sanborn Fire Insurance Map, 1922 (public domain)

Even though most of Nausauket is not located within a flood zone The Hurricane of 1938 and Hurricane Carol (1954) still had a significant impact on the community. In 1938, the 14–18 foot storm surge washed away many homes that were never rebuilt. Most of the City of Warwick was left without power and telephone service for over 100 days. Timber jetties and drainage channels were built after the hurricane to protect the coastline from future storms. These jetties did protect the beach from being swept away during Hurricane Carol, however numerous cottages were still destroyed in the storm surge. Even now, rising waters and changing currents cause issues in Nausauket. In 2017, a low-lying section of Edgewater Drive along Apponaug Cove was permanently closed to vehicular traffic due to coastal erosion.

During the 1970s and 1980s the neighborhood experienced some decline but has since seen a dramatic resurgence in popularity, due to its tranquil beach, charming houses and its close proximity to Rhode Island T. F. Green International Airport, Warwick City Park, many of Warwick's 18 marinas and other local attractions. Nausauket offers a mix of housing, from luxury waterfront properties to more affordable options. In March 2020, a home in Nausauket was featured on the HGTV series "Beach Hunters" episode "Ocean State Forever Home" (Season 8, Episode 1).

== Nausauket Beach ==
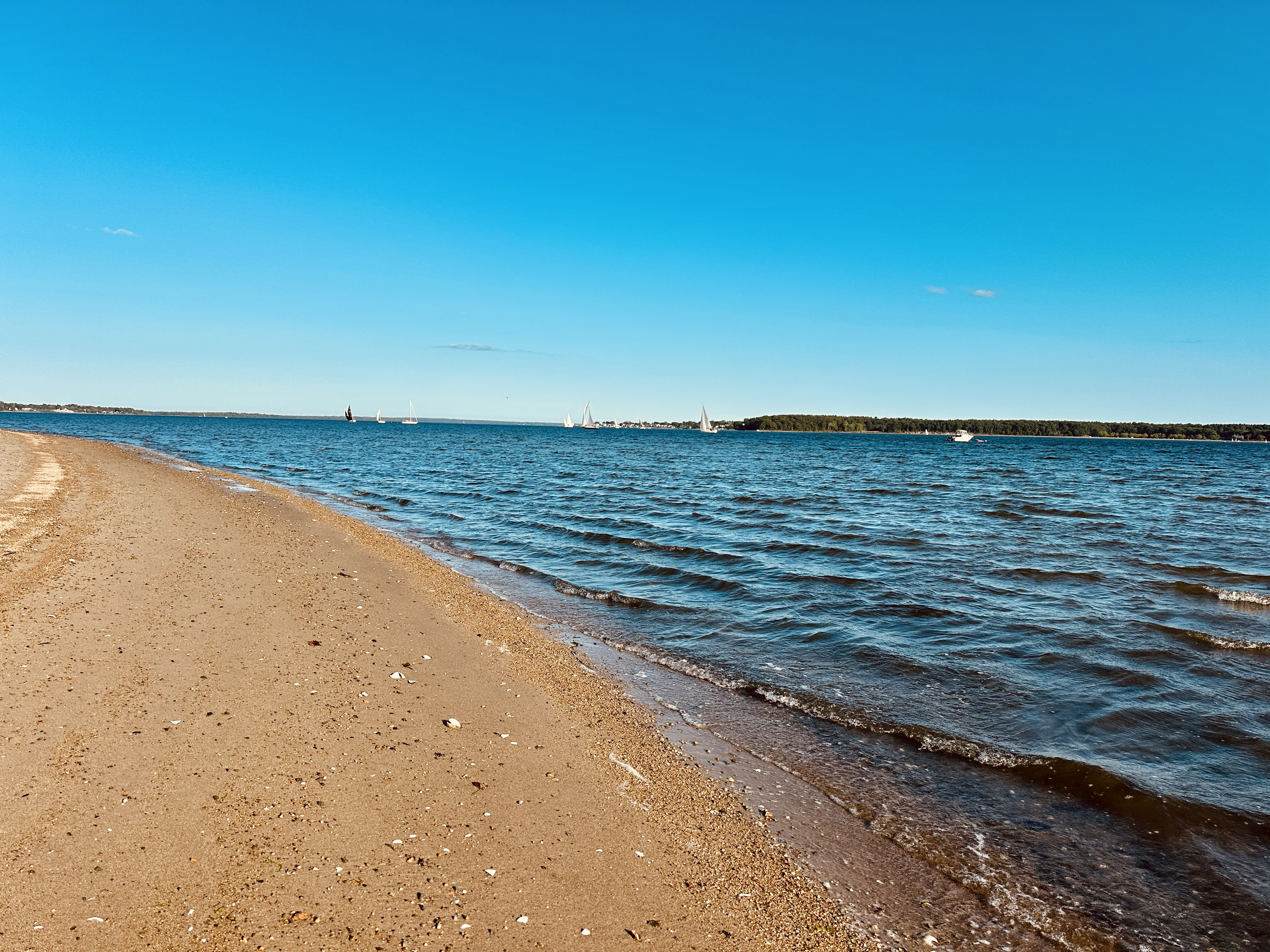
Nausauket Beach June 2025

Nausauket beach is a small beach located at the end of Nausauket Road at a public access point to the shore. The beach is natural and unmaintained, without restrooms, trash receptacles, a parking area or lifeguards. Often called a "hidden gem," it was named 1 of the 12 best beaches in Warwick, RI by TouristSecrets.com in 2024. Due to improved water quality, the waters along the Nausauket shoreline were conditionally reopened to shellfish harvesting in September 2022, for the first time in 20 years.

== Cedar Tree Point ==
Cedar Tree point is a sandy point located at the entrance to Apponaug Cove. It was the site of an ancient Native American settlement. In 1924 the Cedar Tree Point Neighborhood Association was founded to promote a sense of community.

== Schools and colleges ==
The neighborhood has one public school within its borders. The E.G. Robertson School, known as Nausauket School until the 1970s, was built in 1947. The school is historically significant because it was the City of Warwick's first post-World War II modern school and served as a prototype for other schools across the country. It was featured in the January, 1947 issue of The Nation's Schools magazine and was recognized as a historically important municipal building by the City of Warwick in 1996.

== See also ==
- Apponaug, Rhode Island
- Buttonwoods Beach Historic District
- Greenwich Bay (Rhode Island)
