= Potowomut, Rhode Island =

Neighborhood in Warwick, Rhode Island, United States

Coordinates: 41°39′50″N 71°25′19″W

Potowomut (pot-uh-WAHM-ut) is an isolated neighborhood and a peninsula in Warwick, Rhode Island. It is bordered by the Town of East Greenwich to the northwest, and by North Kingstown to the southeast. Greenwich Bay surrounds all other sides.

Potowomut's name translates to "land of fires", the Narragansett Indian name for the neck of land.

== History ==
It was originally a village in the Warwick Township of Kent County. It can be called an exclave, since there is no overland connection to the rest of the city of Warwick. Potowomut is often mistakenly thought to be part of the Town of East Greenwich because it shares the same ZIP code, 02818, as all of East Greenwich and because East Greenwich is the preferred place name for postal purposes. Nathanael Greene, a general in the American Revolutionary War was born here on Forge Farm in 1742. When Warwick was settled, in the seventeenth century, travel by sea was often more convenient than travel over land. Thus, Potowomut's location would have allowed relatively easy travel across Greenwich Bay to Warwick Neck or Buttonwoods.

In the 1680s, the first white settlers arrived with James Greene at what came to be known as Greene's River. Here, his son, James, built a dam and a mill, later; his descendants established an anchor forge, now located at the foot of Old Forge Road. The Greene family mainly used the land to raise cattle and harvest hay, which was then shipped across Greenwich Bay to the wharf in Apponaug, Rhode Island. Upon James' death, the property passed to his son Richard. A fondness for lavish hospitality and fancy living plunged Richard Greene into deep debt.

== Geography ==
To visit Potowomut by land, one must leave the City of Warwick. The most common route follows US Route 1 (Post Rd.), and leaving East Greenwich, follows Forge Road to the east.

== Emergency services ==
Potowomut's Fire Fighting services were for a long time provided by the town of East Greenwich for a yearly fee. In December 2015, the City of Warwick opened a new fire station and the Warwick Fire Department assumed responsibility for providing Fire and EMS protection to the area. WFD Fire Station 10 houses Engine Co. 10. The station is affectionately known as "The Outpost" due to its seclusion from the other stations of the department. Police Services are provided by the Warwick Police Department.

== Features and attractions ==
Today, Potowomut is a reminder of Warwick's past. The peninsula's eastern tip gives a view of Greenwich Bay. The narrow streets have a mix of older and newer houses. Some were originally beach houses, closed in the winter months, now converted to full-time residences.

Unique to Potowomut is Goddard Memorial State Park. Goddard Park attracts thousands of visitors each year as Rhode Island's most popular metropolitan park. Its facilities include a 9-hole golf course designed by Donald Ross, a horse barn where the public can rent and ride horses, a beach with bathhouse, sprawling open fields, and a carousel building for functions. Located next to the park is Potowomut Golf Club, a private club.

Potowomut is a peninsula on Narragansett Bay which can only be accessed via East Greenwich and/or the town of North Kingstown, only East Greenwich has municipal sewer lines (North Kingstown is in the process of putting them in along Post Road and part of Camp Avenue only). Potowomut cannot be accessed regarding a municipal sewer line due to geography. The city has attempted numerous times to reach a viable agreement with both towns which would enable it to access either of both municipal sewer lines, upon a viable agreement. Potowomut, located on the Narragansett Bay, consists of multiple residential neighborhoods resulting in a catalyst of sewage over-spill into Narragansett Bay. There is no solution at this time.
