= Apponaug Historic District =

Historic district in Rhode Island, United States

- U.S. National Register of Historic Places
- U.S. Historic district
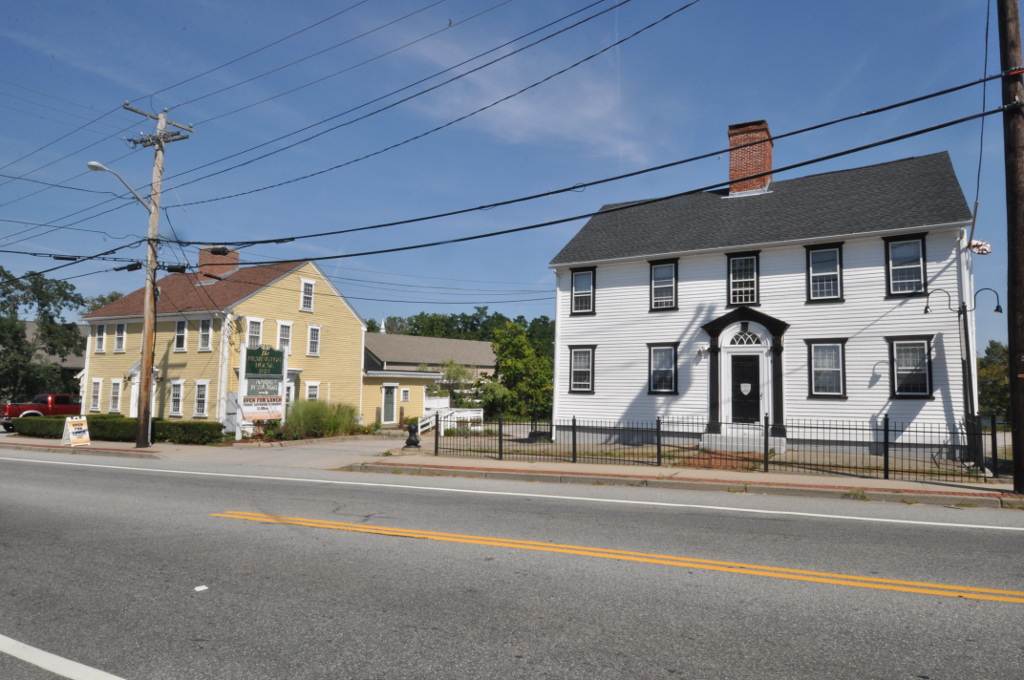
- 3376 and 3384 Post Road

- Location within Rhode Island Location within the United States
- Location: 3376, 3384, 3387, 3391, 3397-3399, and 3404 Post Rd., Warwick, Rhode Island
- Coordinates: 41°38′18″N 71°27′4″W
- Area: 2 acres (0.81 ha)
- Built: 1800
- Architectural style: Colonial, Federal
- MPS: Warwick MRA
- NRHP reference No.: 84001833
- Added to NRHP: February 23, 1984

The Apponaug Historic District is a 2-acre (0.81 ha) residential historic district in the central village of Warwick, Rhode Island, which is also known as Apponaug. It consists of five properties (numbered 3376, 3384, 3387, 3391, 3397–3399, and 3404 Post Rd.) dating to no later than the early 19th century. These houses are a remnant of what was once a much larger collection of period houses in Apponaug, many of which have succumbed to modern 20th-century development of the area.

The district was listed on the National Register of Historic Places in 1984. Since the listing, the odd-numbered houses have all been demolished.

== See also ==
- National Register of Historic Places listings in Kent County, Rhode Island
