= Hoxsie, Rhode Island =

Section of Warwick, Rhode Island, U.S.

Coordinates: 41°43′59″N 71°24′39″W

Hoxsie is the largest section in the city of Warwick, Rhode Island. At the center of the city, bordered by Airport Road and Warwick Avenue, the area is adjacent to T. F. Green Airport, Rhode Island's primary airport.

Hoxsie Four Corners, at the junction of Warwick Avenue, Airport Road, and West Shore Road is a major intersection in Warwick.
