= T. F. Green Airport Connector Road =

Highway in Rhode Island, USA

Airport Connector Road
- Mary Brennan Parkway
- Length: 1.1 mi (1.8 km)
- West end: I-95 in Warwick
- Major junctions: US 1 in Warwick
- East end: T. F. Green Airport in Warwick

The Airport Connector Road, also known as the T. F. Green Airport Connector Road or simply the T. F. Green Airport Connector, is a short, unnumbered highway in the U.S. state of Rhode Island that connects Interstate 95 (I-95) with T. F. Green Airport. The route, which is 1.1 miles (1.8 km) long, is a limited-access freeway for its entire length. The road is situated entirely in the city of Warwick, and is accessible from Interstate 95 via exit 13. The Airport Connector Road has two eastbound interchanges with Jefferson Boulevard and Post Road (U.S. Route 1 or US 1) before terminating at the Bruce Sundlun Terminal of T. F. Green Airport.

A bill introduced to the Rhode Island General Assembly on March 12, 1998 aimed to rename the freeway the Mary Brennan Parkway, after Mary Brennan, a Cumberland resident who served as Director of Marketing for the Rhode Island Airport Corporation until 1995. Brennan, who was instrumental in promoting the airport's renovation project, died in 1996. The bill passed unanimously in the Rhode Island State Senate and the House of Representatives, officially renaming the road in 1999.

== Exit list ==
To conform with Federal highway standards, RIDOT is currently in the process of phasing in and renumbering the exit numbers of various State, US Routes and Interstates including the airport connector. The entire route is in Warwick, Kent County.

mi	km	Exit	Destinations	Notes
0.0	0.0	-	I-95 south – New York City	Westbound exit and eastbound entrance
0.1	0.16	-	I-95 north – Providence	Westbound exit and eastbound entrance
0.6	0.97	1A	Jefferson Boulevard	Eastbound exit and westbound entrance
0.8	1.3	1B	US 1 (Post Road)	Eastbound exit and westbound entrance
1.1	1.8		T. F. Green Airport (Bruce Sundlun Terminal)	
1.000 mi = 1.609 km; 1.000 km = 0.621 mi
