= T. F. Green Airport station =

Railway station in Warwick, Rhode Island

T. F. Green Airport/Warwick
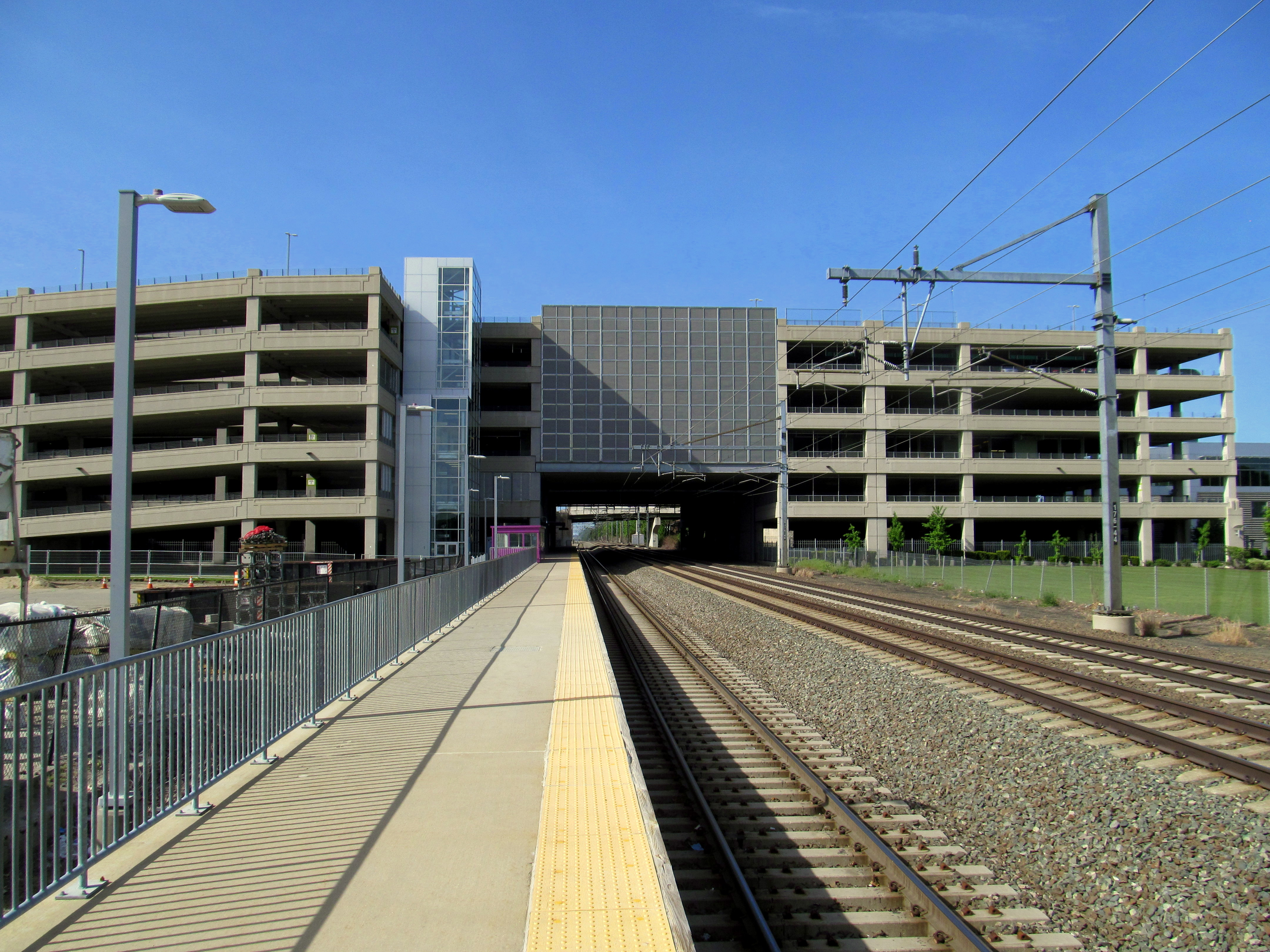
- T.F. Green Airport station and parking garage in 2017

General information
- Location: 700 Jefferson Boulevard; Warwick, Rhode Island
- Coordinates: 41°43′39″N 71°26′30″W
- Owner: State of Rhode Island
- Line: Amtrak Northeast Corridor
- Platforms: 1 side platform
- Tracks: 3
- Connections: RIPTA: 14

Construction
- Parking: 650 spaces, paid
- Cycle facilities: Racks
- Accessible: Yes

Other information
- Fare zone: 9

History
- Opened: December 6, 2010

Passengers
- 2024: 124 (weekday average daily boardings)

Services
Preceding station	MBTA	Following station
Wickford Junction Terminus	Providence/Stoughton Line	Providence toward South Station
Former and proposed services
Preceding station	Amtrak	Following station
Kingston toward Norfolk, Newport News or Roanoke	Northeast Regional (proposed stop)	Providence toward Boston South
Preceding station	MBTA	Following station
Terminus	Foxboro event service 2012–2018	Providence toward Foxboro
Location

T. F. Green Airport station (signed as T. F. Green Airport/Warwick) is a train station and intermodal facility in Warwick, Rhode Island, on the Northeast Corridor, adjacent to T. F. Green Airport. It extends the MBTA Commuter Rail Providence/Stoughton Line from Boston, which previously only went as far as the Providence train station. The station was completed in October 2010 and MBTA service began on December 6, 2010. On November 14, 2011, service expanded to 10 weekday trains in each direction. Trips to and from Boston's South Station take 75 to 90 minutes.

The station's primary purpose is to serve local commuters to Providence and Boston, but it also carries passengers and employees to and from the airport. The station also makes it possible to move between T.F. Green and Logan International Airport in about two hours via subway and commuter rail. Amtrak trains cannot and do not serve the station because the track that serves the single side platform is not electrified. Funding was not provided for the necessary track and electrical work, although long-range plans call for this infrastructure to be provided.

== History ==
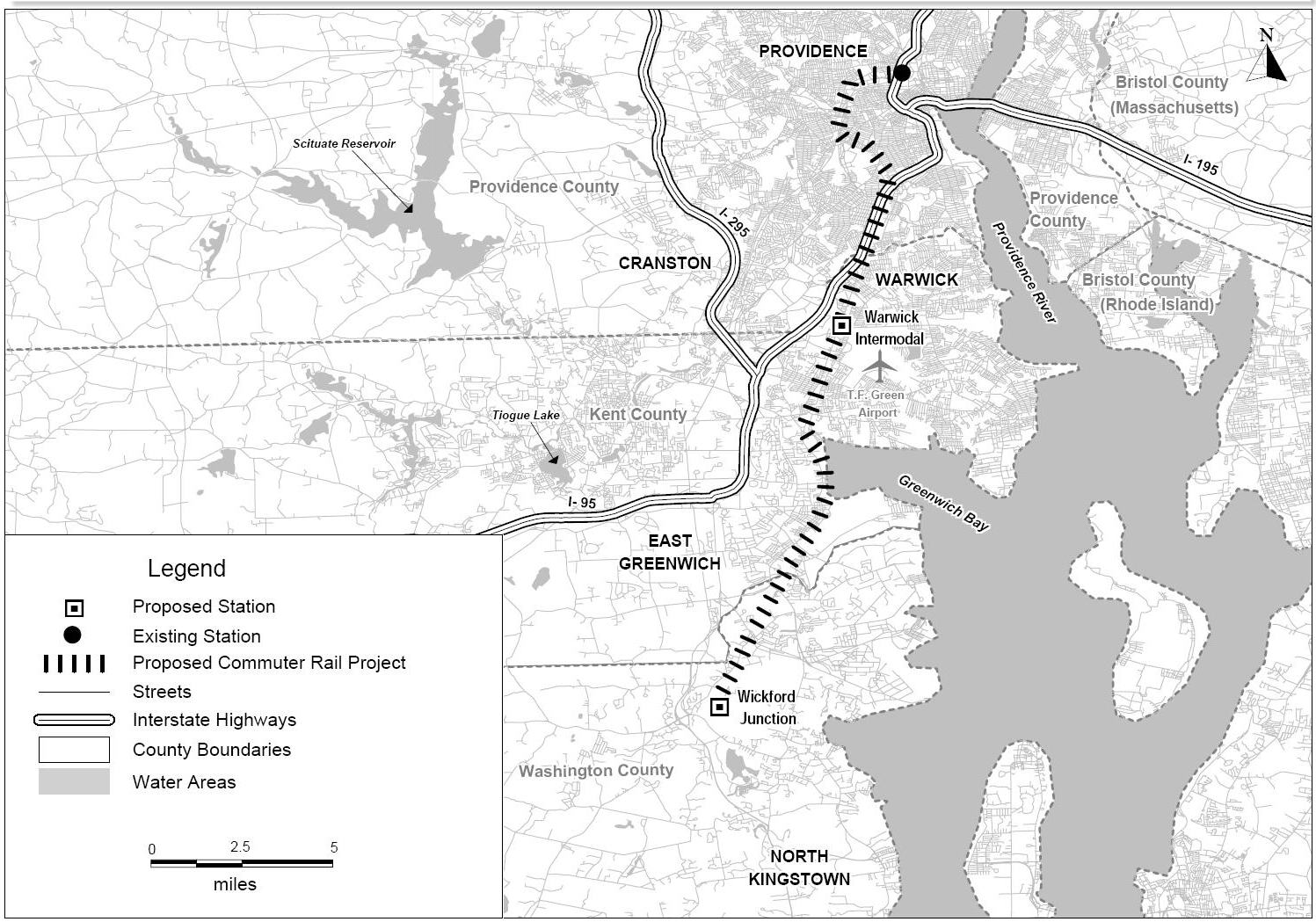
2007 map of South County Commuter Rail service to T.F. Green Airport and Wickford Junction

A state study of rail corridors was completed in 1994 and the Northeast Corridor was designated as the highest-priority line for commuter service to Providence. An addendum in 1995 projected daily ridership from a Warwick station to be 454 in 2000 and 529 in 2020. An operations plan was released in 2001, and environmental assessment was completed in 2003.

The station's ceremonial groundbreaking took place on July 17, 2006, but construction was delayed by negotiations with Amtrak over the agreement to allow the MBTA to run commuter trains on Amtrak-owned tracks. Site preparation began in September 2007 and construction began in late 2008 or early 2009. The station was originally scheduled to open in late 2010, and construction was completed on schedule, with the opening ceremony taking place on October 27, 2010.

On October 13, 2010, the MBTA and the Rhode Island Department of Transportation signed an agreement enabling MBTA operations to the station to begin on December 6, 2010, initially with 6 inbound and 5 outbound trains each weekday. This service consisted of three peak-hour trains in each direction between T.F. Green and South Station, plus several off-peak shuttles to/from Providence. This was despite earlier concerns that service could be delayed pending completion of the Wickford Junction station and the siding there used to allow trains to reverse directions. However, the siding at T.F. Green was deemed sufficient for operations. In November 2011, service was increased significantly, with mid-day service and more rush hour trains. The line was extended 10 miles past T.F. Green with the opening of Wickford Junction station in April 2012.

Normal service to T.F. Green Airport is weekday-only, with no regular weekend trains. Beginning on September 16, 2012, special Sunday trains serving New England Patriots games were extended from Providence to T.F. Green Airport. These trains run on game days only to Foxboro, which was not served by regular daily MBTA service. Game-day service was cut back to Providence in the 2019 season.

=== Ridership ===
Daily boardings were projected to reach 529 in 2020 by the 1995 analysis; this was halved to 245 in the 2003 Environmental Assessment.

In the first quarter of 2012, inbound ridership from the station averaged 149 riders per day, lower than state officials hoped. By July 2012, the count increased to more than 200 daily, even as passenger traffic at the airport decreased.

By early 2017, total ridership (boardings plus alightings) was 414. For the second half of 2017, the state offered free intrastate rides, primarily in an attempt to promote the under-utilized Wickford Junction station. The six-month promotion was expected to cost about $102,000. However, a 2018 count had just 227 daily boardings – barely increased from 2012.

== Funding, facilities and cost ==
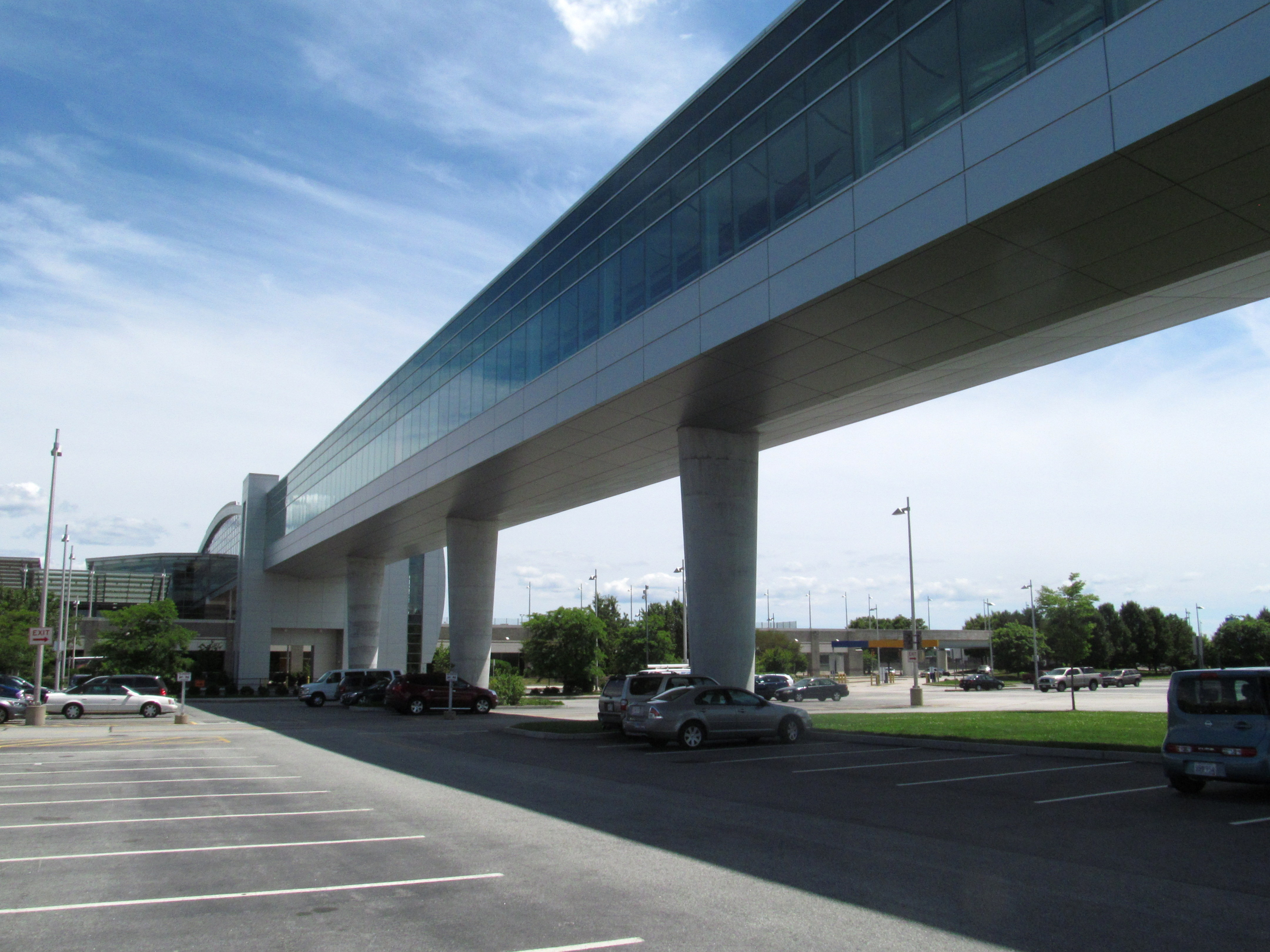
Interlink skywalk as seen from an airport parking lot

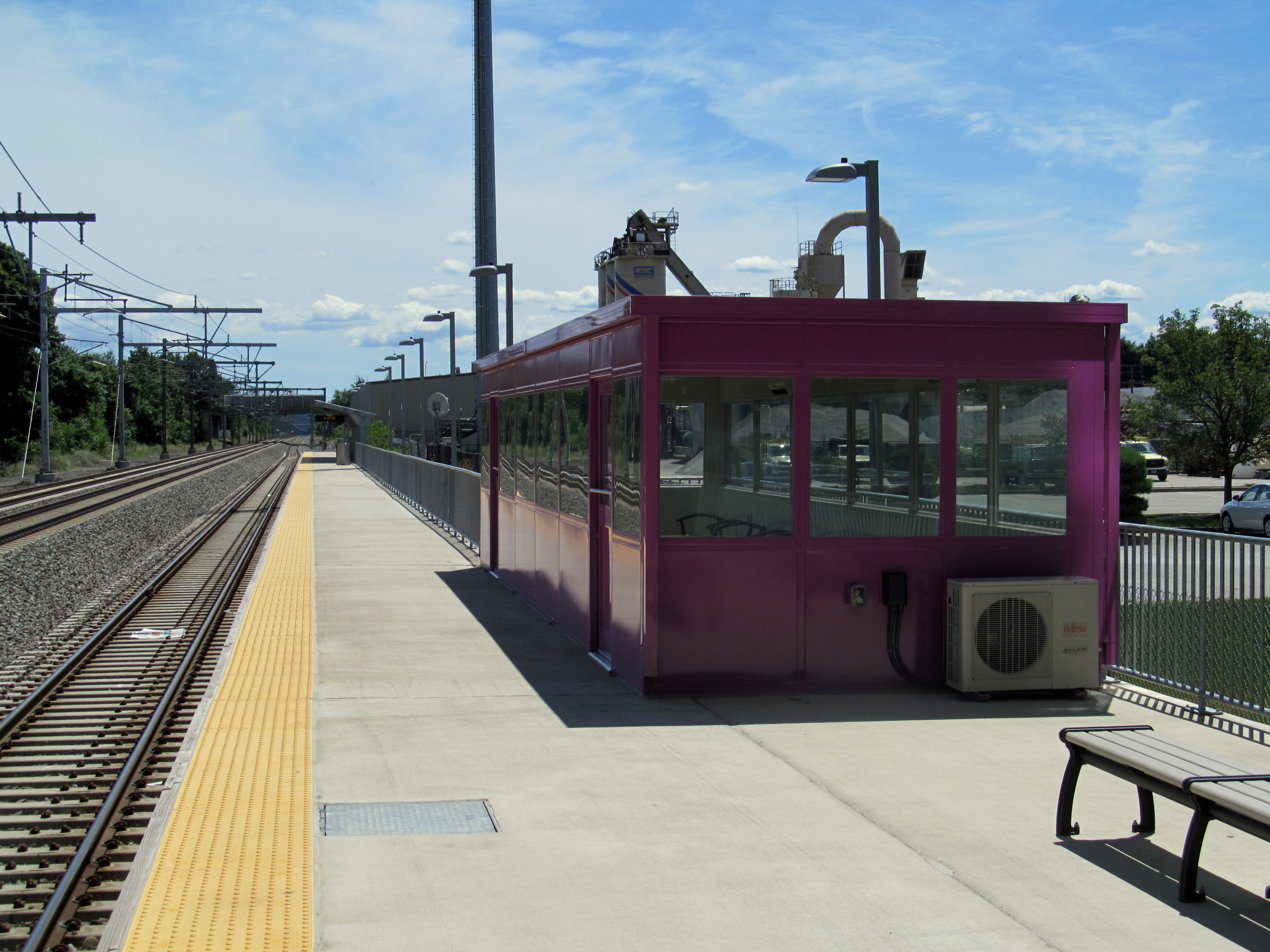
A new passenger shelter was installed on the platform in 2012

The station includes a four-level, 3,500-space garage with facilities for airport car rental companies and park and ride commuters. The station is connected to the airport via an elevated 1,250-foot (380-meter) skywalk with moving sidewalks, known as the Interlink. Costs included:

- $28.1M — commuter parking garage
- $46.9M — rental car garage
- $40.2M — rental car desk and service areas
- $22.9M — commuter rail platform
- $43.5M — skywalk
- $14.1M — connection from airport terminal to skywalk

The total cost of the T.F. Green amenities, plus an additional station at Wickford Junction was $336 million. The project sponsor was the Rhode Island Department of Transportation, which assembled funding consisting of:

- $29M already collected from a $4.25 car rental fee
- $22.2M grant from Rhode Island
- $88.9M grant from federal highway funds
- $42M loan from the federal government under the Transportation Finance and Infrastructure Act
- $39.6M bond from Rhode Island Economic Development Corporation (of which the Airport Corporation is a subsidiary)

$20M of federal funding was earmarked by former Rhode Island senator Lincoln Chafee in the 2005 SAFETEA transportation bill.

As part of the 1989 Pilgrim Partnership Agreement, Rhode Island provides capital funding (including some of its federal formula funds) for MBTA expansion in the state. (Rhode Island also gave the MBTA $11 million to cover capital costs for the T.F. Green project.) Massachusetts (through the MBTA) provides the operating subsidy for MBTA Commuter Rail service in return. Rhode Island also pays Amtrak to allow the MBTA to use its tracks.

The Rhode Island Airport Corporation, which runs T.F. Green Airport, will be responsible for repaying the bonds using revenues from car rental and commuter parking facilities.

== Amtrak ==
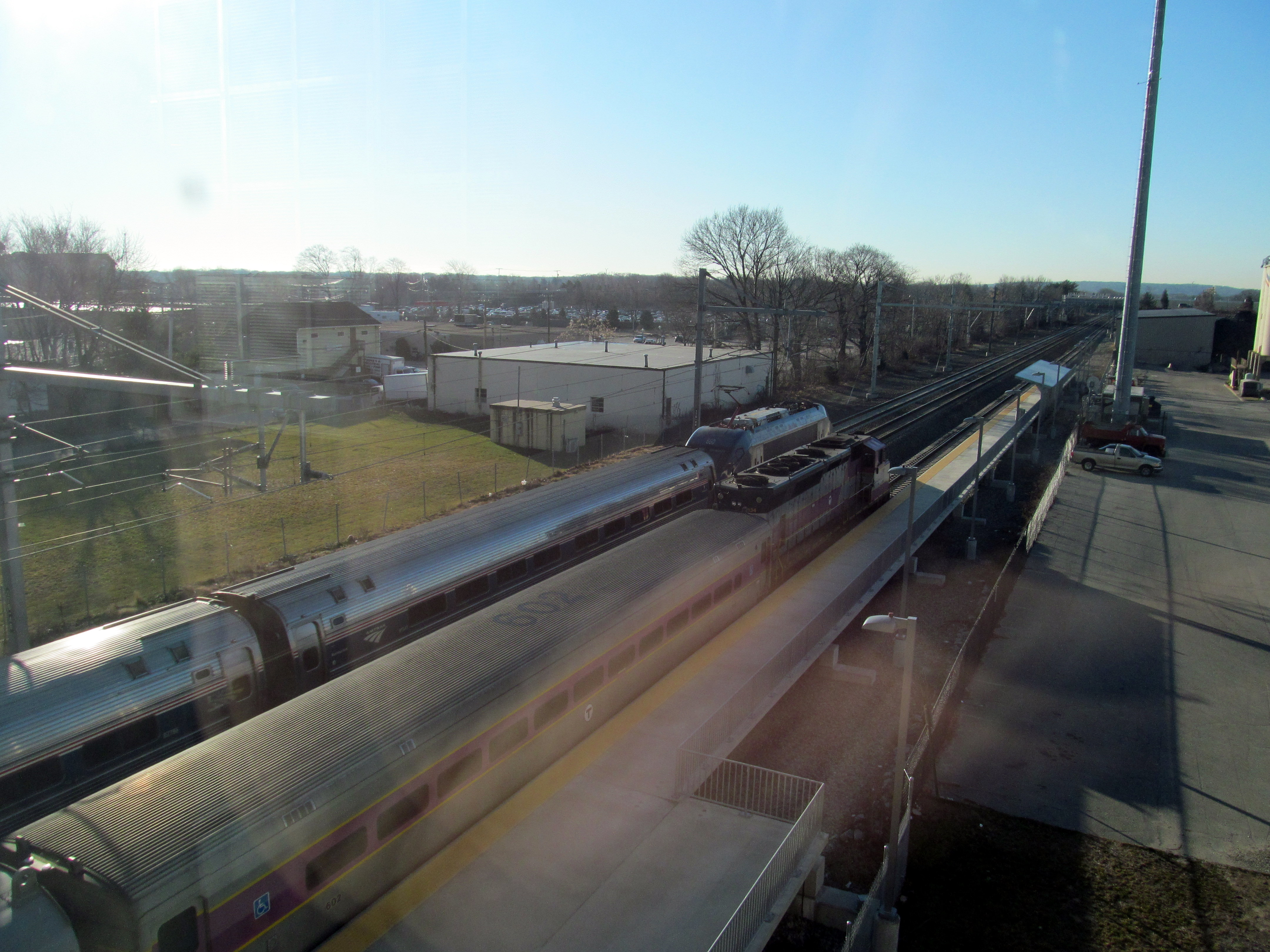
An Amtrak train passing a stopped commuter train at T.F. Green

Although Amtrak owns the tracks through the station, T.F. Green Airport is not a stop on Amtrak's Northeast Regional or Acela Express trains. The station is on a third track built west of the existing two-track Northeast Corridor line, however the new track was not electrified due to lack of funding. All Amtrak trains currently operating on the Northeast Corridor require overhead electric power. Amtrak had requested a separate track for its trains, which was not built, and has also cited a lack of sufficient ridership for the stop to be economically sustainable. Long-term Amtrak plans released in 2010 called for a fourth track (as a second passing siding) with a second platform at the station for intrastate commuter service as well as possible future Amtrak use. The new siding and the current siding would need to have catenary wire extended over them in order for Amtrak trains to stop.

A 2017 Amtrak/RIDOT study analyzed several potential scenarios for intercity service to the station: addition of Amtrak service with a new platform, extension of Shore Line East service to Providence, additional Westerly–Boston local service, and new intercity line between Boston and T.F. Green, Westerly, or New London. In June 2019, a $2.8 million federal grant was awarded to fund preliminary engineering and environmental review work to allow Northeast Regional trains to stop at the station.
