= Apponaug, Rhode Island =

Neighborhood in Warwick, Rhode Island, United States

Coordinates: 41°42′01″N 71°27′35″W

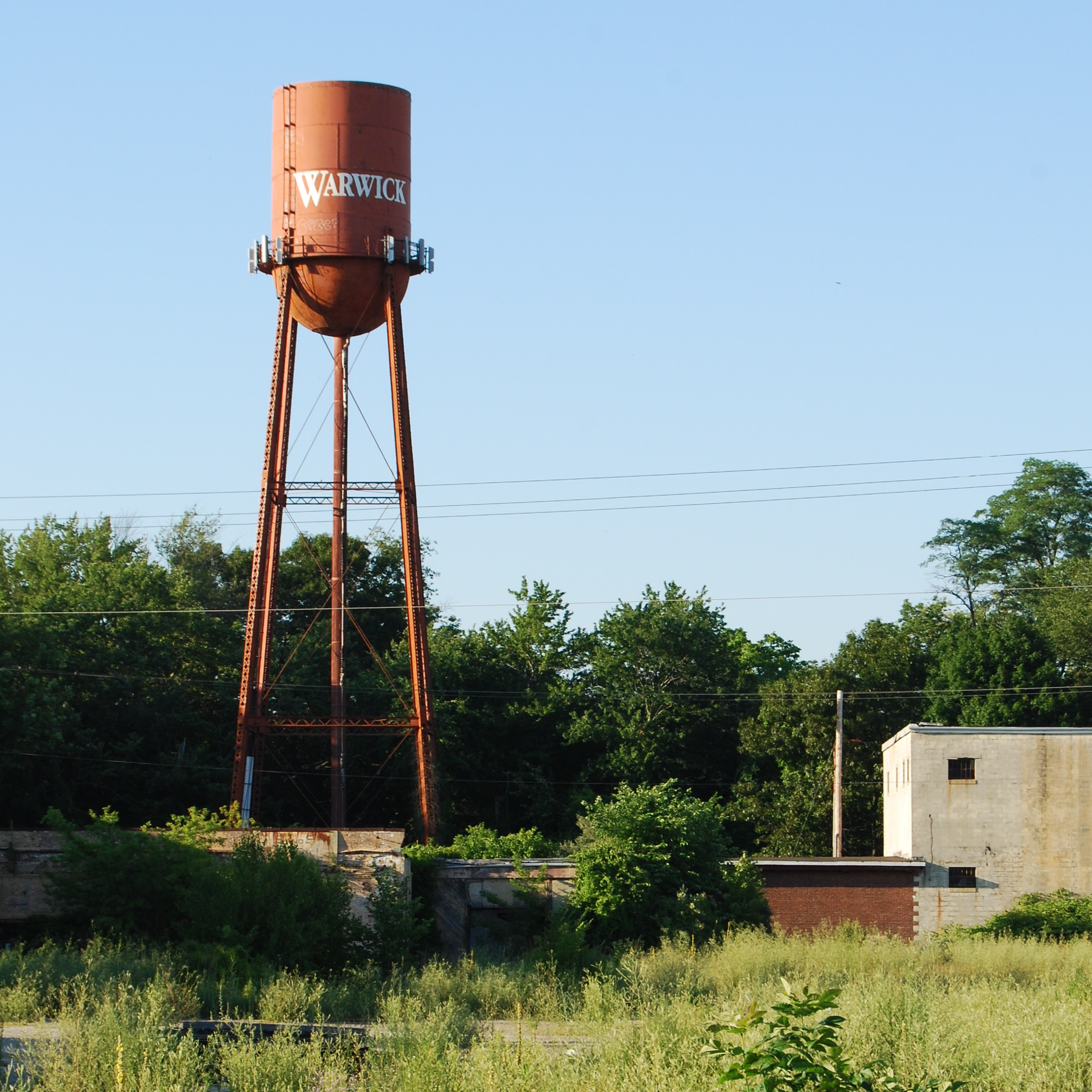
1902 steel water tower in Apponaug Village, Warwick, Rhode Island. Built by Chicago Bridge & Iron Company. The original conical top is missing. The water tower was demolished in 2015.

Apponaug is a neighborhood in central Warwick, Rhode Island, United States, situated on Apponaug Cove, a tributary to Greenwich Bay and nearby Narragansett Bay. The name Apponaug is a derivation of the Narragansett Indian word for "place of oysters". Indeed, Apponaug Cove holds one of the richest shellfish beds in the United States and was densely populated by the Narragansett people for many centuries prior to the arrival of European settlers.

Apponaug consists of what is effectively a large rotary. In the 1960s, the Rhode Island Department of Transportation was in need of a faster way to feed the increasing number of cars through Apponaug that were en route to West Shore Road and other locations. Traffic patterns were rerouted in what was supposed to be a temporary solution, creating a one-way hub in the center of the village.

Apponaug is located at the intersection of three of Warwick's primary streets: Post Road (U.S. Route 1), Greenwich Avenue (R.I. Route 5), and Centerville Road (R.I. Route 117). It is considered downtown or central Warwick, as Warwick City Hall is located here, plus police and fire headquarters, the Apponaug branch of the Warwick Public Library, a museum, and the post office. The cluster of municipal buildings in the center of Apponaug is designated as the Warwick Civic Center Historic District, while a cluster of stately homes in the southern part of the neighborhood is designated as the Apponaug Historic District.

== See also ==
- 1922 New England Textile Strike

== Notable Person ==
Apponaug is the birthplace of George S. Greene, Union Army general and noted engineer.
