= Warwick, Rhode Island =

City in Rhode Island, United States

- City
- City of Warwick
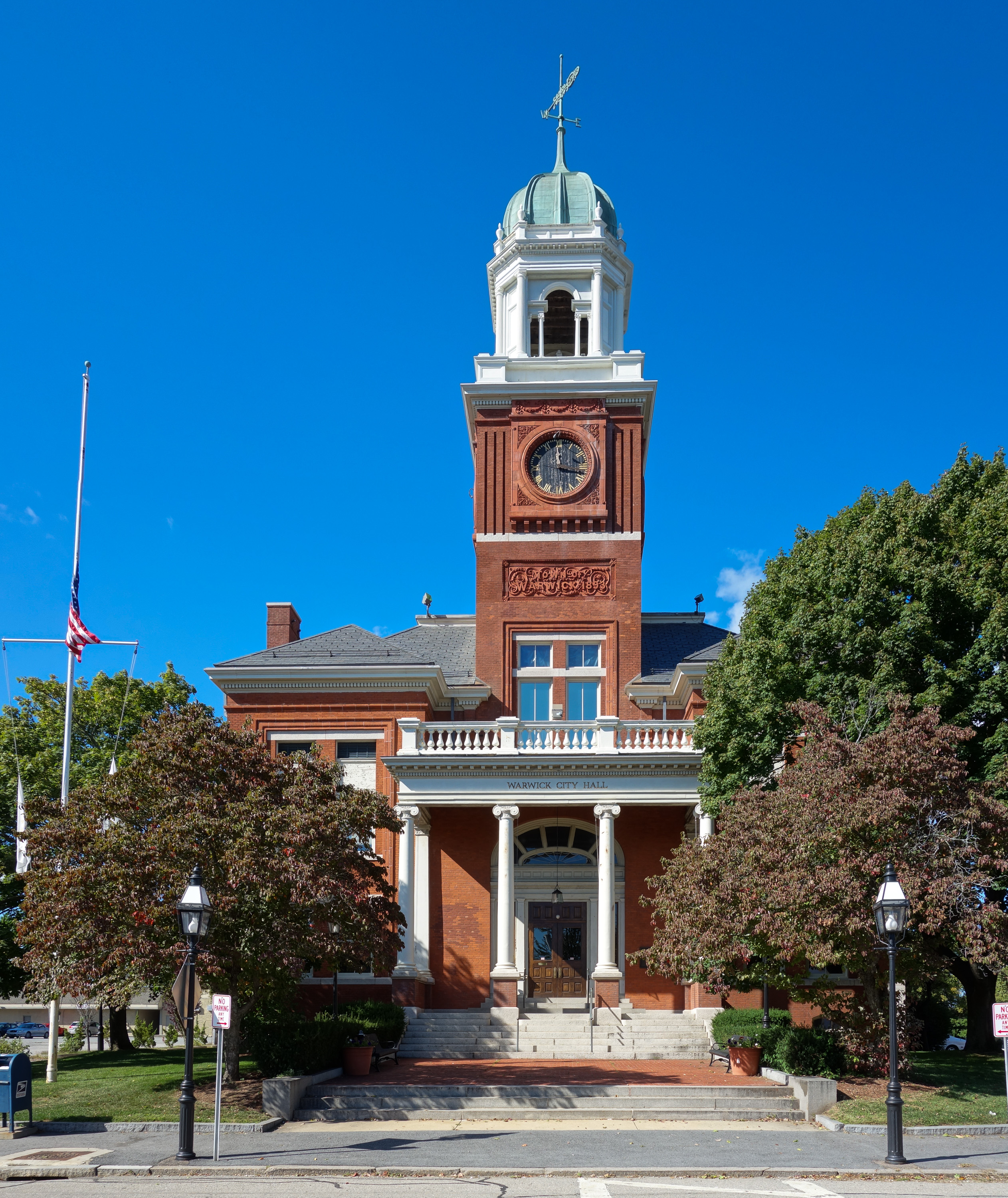
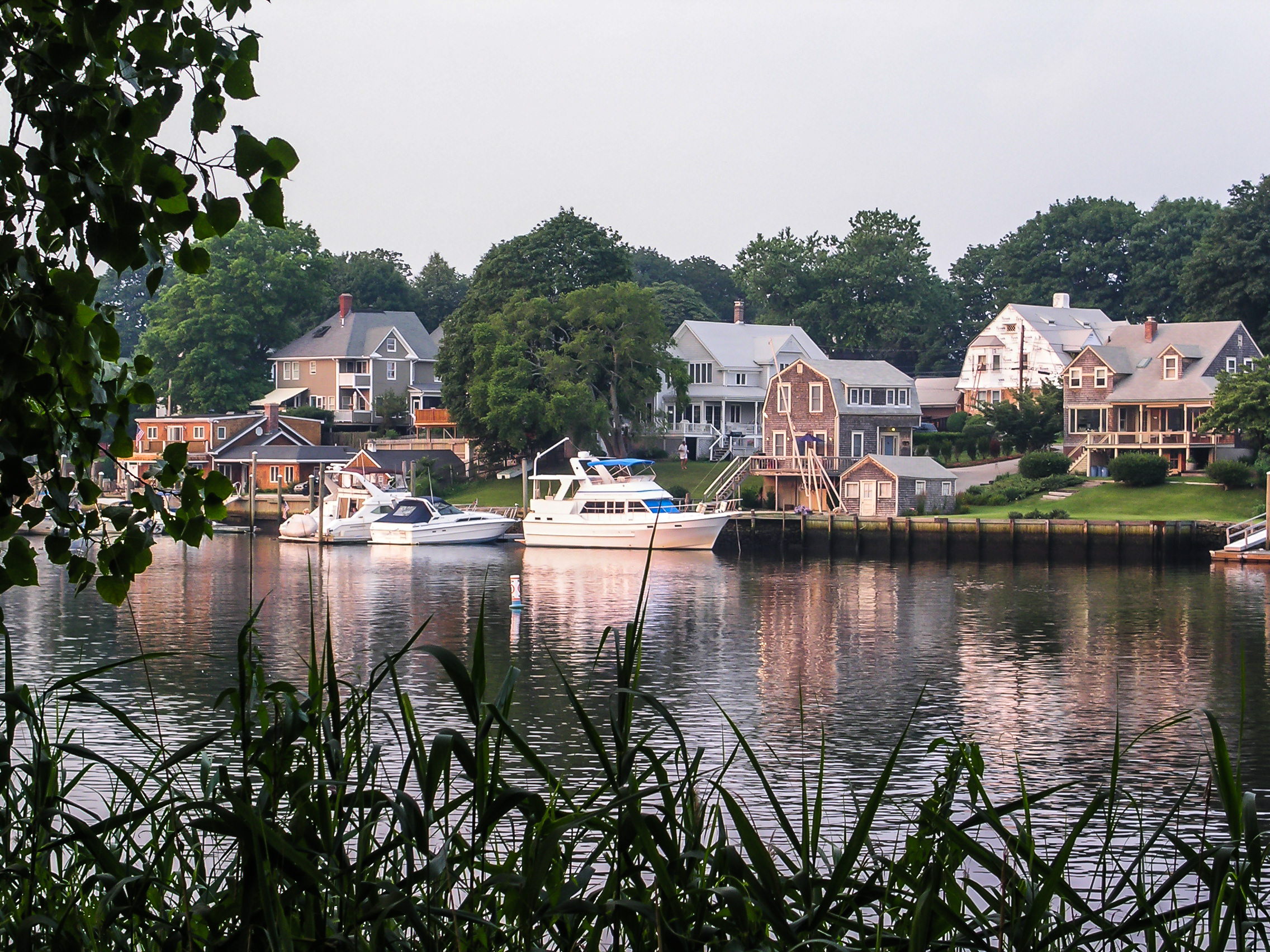
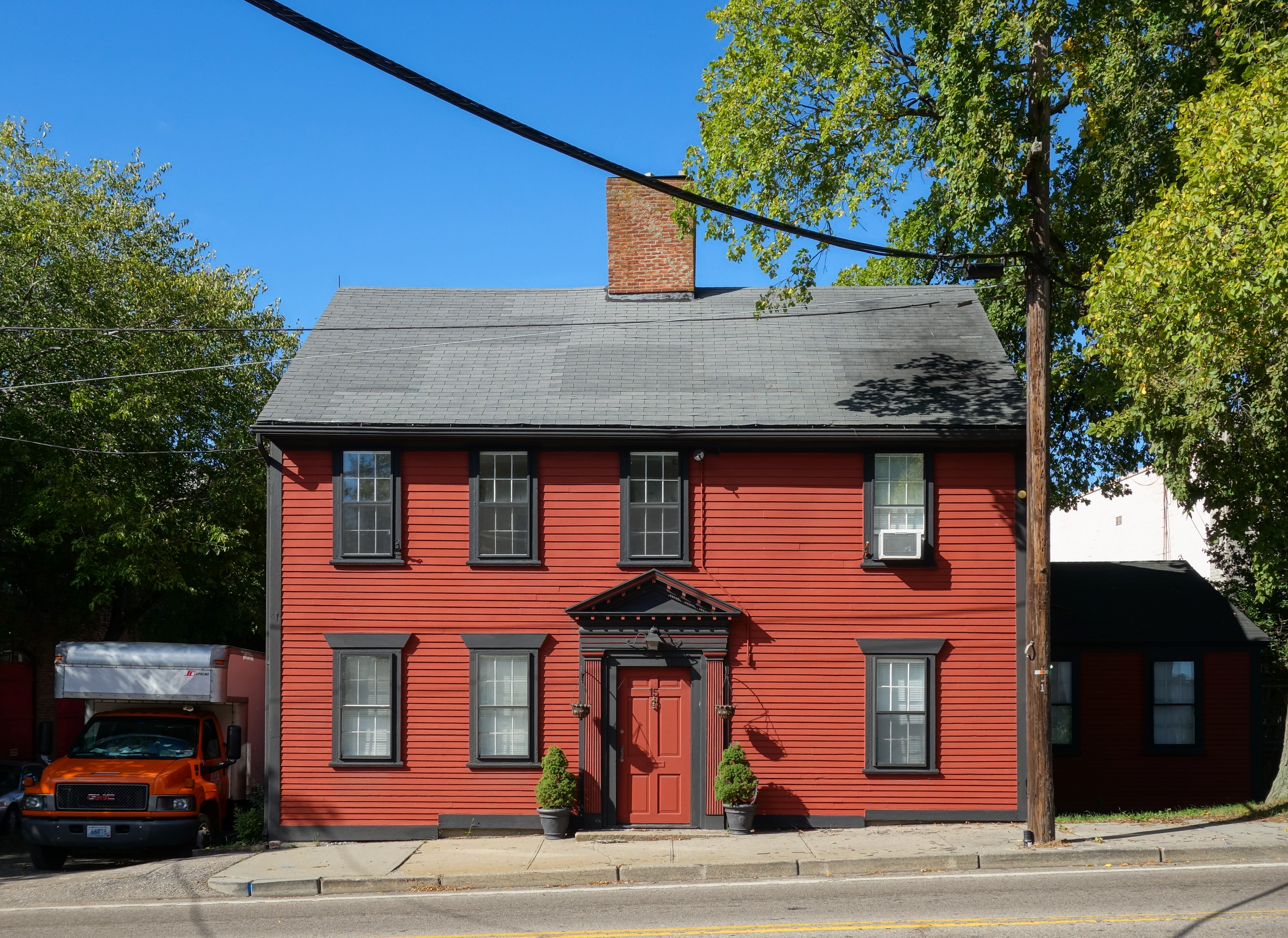
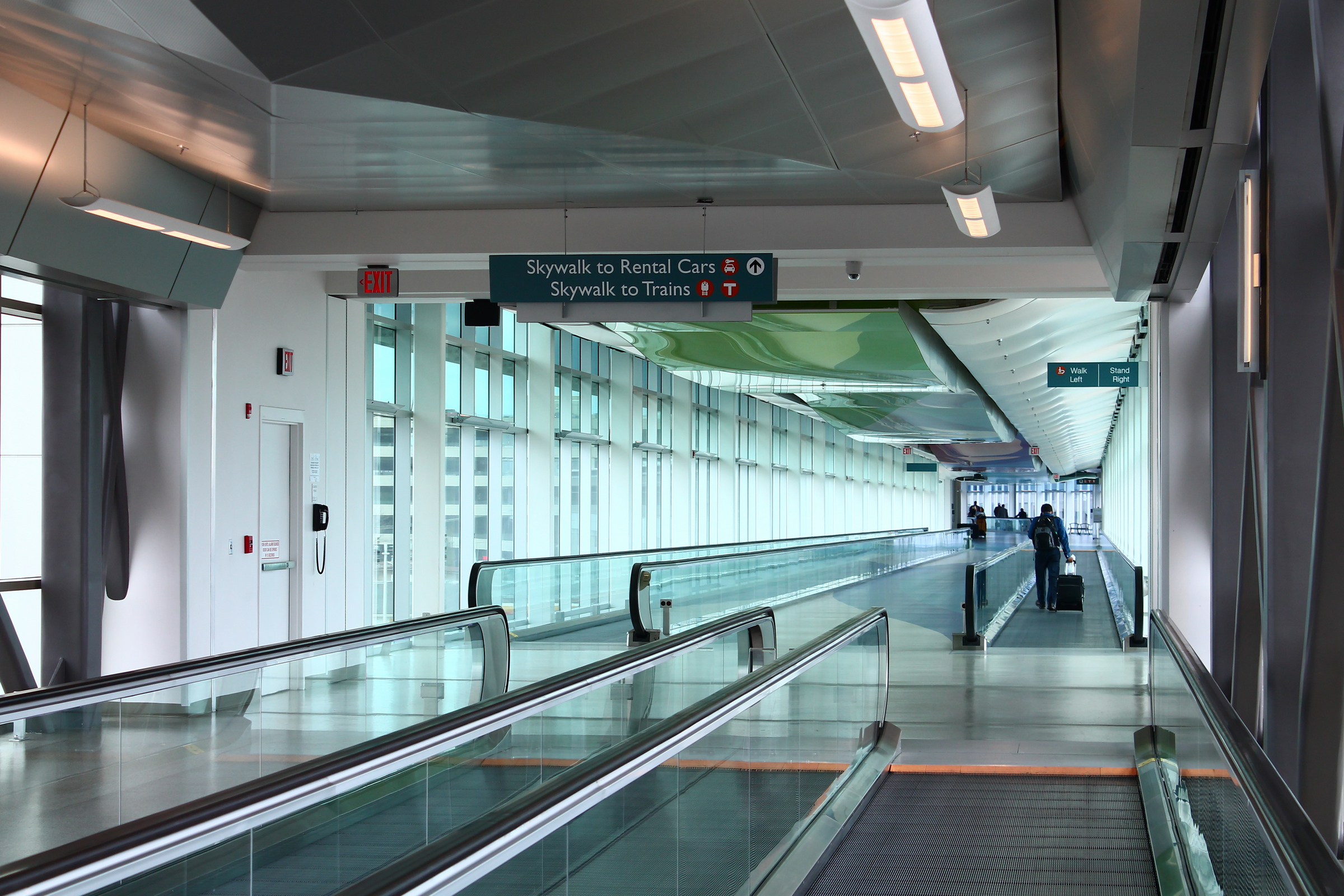
- Warwick City Hall, Brush Neck Cove, the Caleb Greene House, and T. F. Green Airport

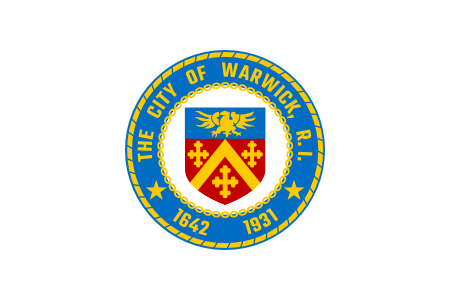
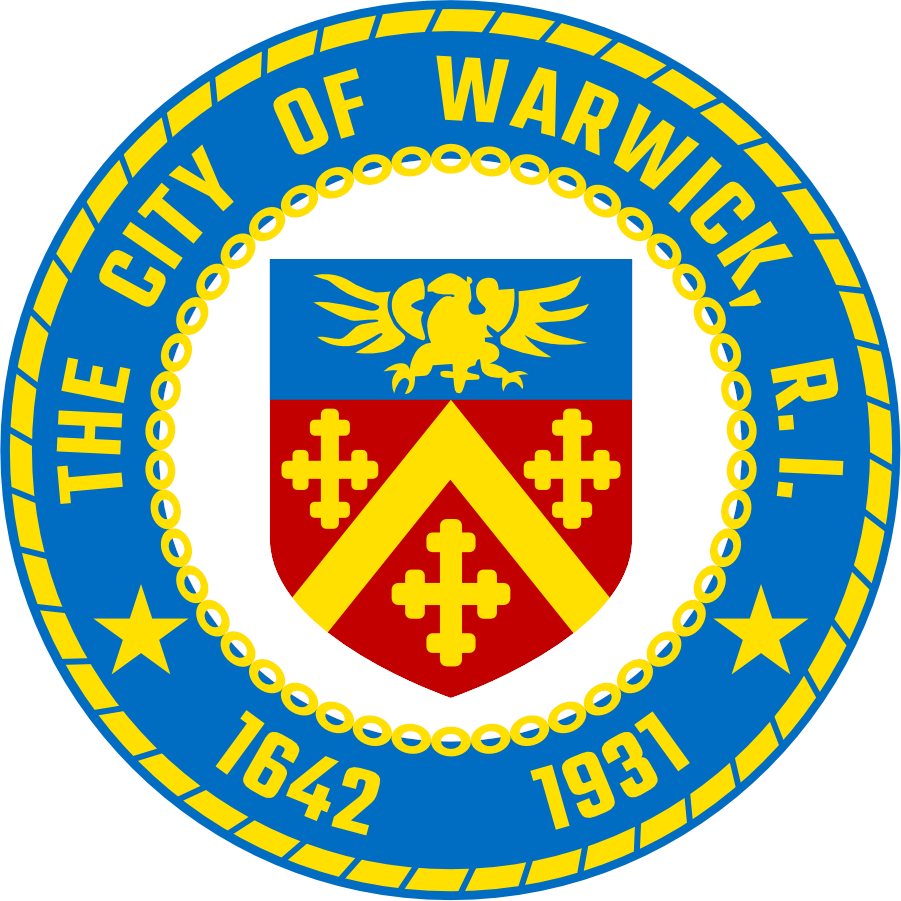
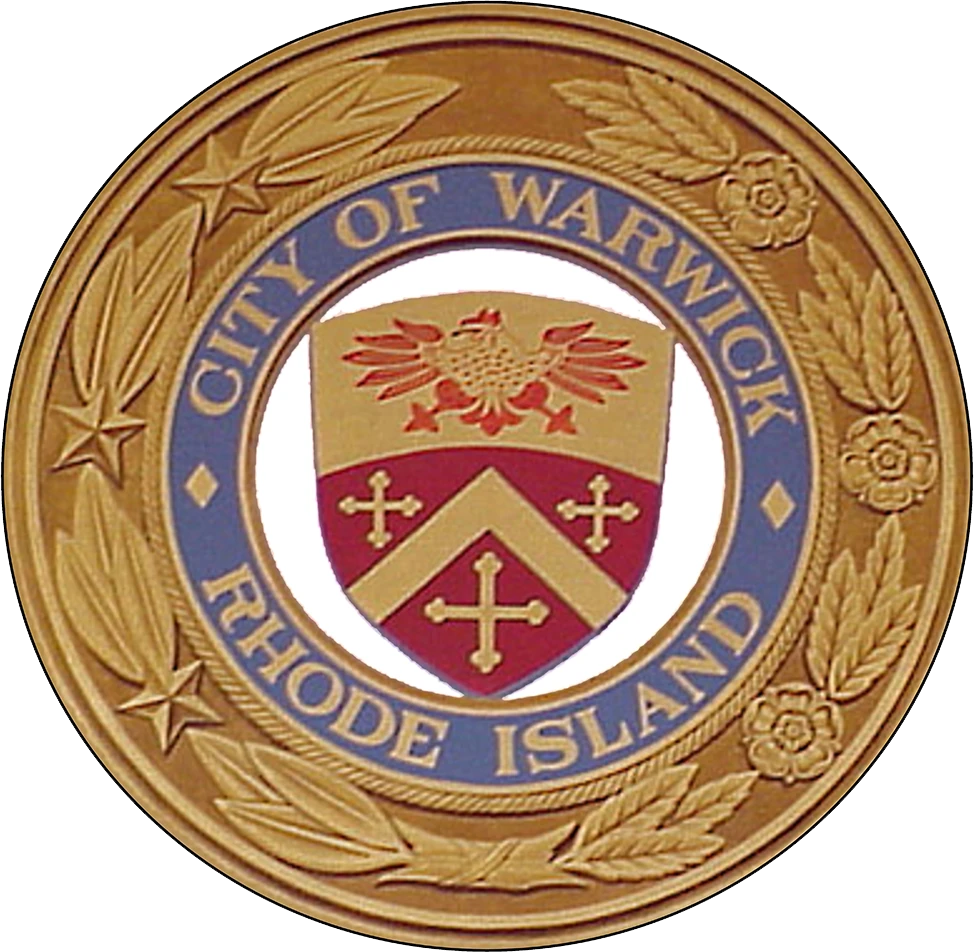
- Flag Seal Coat of arms

- Location in Kent County, Rhode Island
- Coordinates: 41°43′N 71°25′W
- Country: United States
- State: Rhode Island
- County: Kent
- Founded: 1642
- Incorporated (town): August 8, 1647
- Incorporated (city): April 21, 1931
- Named for: Robert Rich, 2nd Earl of Warwick

Government
  - Type: Mayor-council
  - Mayor: Frank Picozzi (I)
  - City Council: William Foley (D); Jeremy M. Rix (D); Bryan Nappa (D); Salvatore DeLuise (D); Edgar N. Ladouceur (D); William Muto (D); John Kirby (D); Anthony Sinapi (D); Vincent Gebhart (D)

Area
  - Total: 49.75 sq mi (128.85 km^{2})
  - Land: 35.00 sq mi (90.65 km^{2})
  - Water: 14.75 sq mi (38.20 km^{2})
- Elevation: 20 ft (6.1 m)

Population (2020)
  - Total: 82,823
  - Density: 2,366.3/sq mi (913.64/km^{2})
- Time zone: UTC−5 (Eastern)
  - Summer (DST): UTC−4 (Eastern)
- ZIP Codes: 02886, 02888–02889
- Area code: 401
- FIPS code: 44-74300
- GNIS feature ID: 1220018
- Website: warwickri.gov

Warwick (/ˈwɒrɪk/ WORR-ik or /ˈwɔːrwɪk/ WOR-wik) is a city in Kent County, Rhode Island, United States, and is the third-largest city in the state, with a population of 82,823 at the 2020 census. Warwick is located approximately 12 miles (19 km) south of downtown Providence, Rhode Island, 63 miles (101 km) southwest of Boston, Massachusetts, and 171 miles (275 km) northeast of New York City.

Warwick was founded by Samuel Gorton in 1642 and has witnessed major events in American history. It was decimated during King Philip's War (1675–1676) and was the site of the Gaspee Affair, the first act of armed resistance against the British, preceding even the Boston Tea Party, and a significant prelude to the American Revolution. Warwick was also the home of Revolutionary War General Nathanael Greene, George Washington's second-in-command, and Civil War General George S. Greene, a hero of the Battle of Gettysburg.

Today, it is home to Rhode Island's main airport, T. F. Green Airport, which serves the Providence area and also functions as a reliever for Logan International Airport in Boston, Massachusetts. Warwick was also home to Rocky Point, which closed in 1995 and is now a state park.

== Early history ==
Warwick was settled by Samuel Gorton in 1642. Narragansett Sachem Miantonomi sold him the Shawhomett Purchase for 144 fathoms of wampum. This included the towns of Coventry and West Warwick, Rhode Island. However, Sachems Sacononoco and Pumham claimed that Miantonomi had sold the land without asking for their approval. They took their case to Boston, where they placed their lands under Massachusetts rule. In 1643, Massachusetts Bay Colony sent a militia force to Shawomett to arrest Gorton and his followers. After a tense standoff, all but three of the Gortonists surrendered to the Massachusetts forces. Gorton then sailed back to England and sought a charter from the King. He was greatly assisted in gaining it by Robert Rich, 2nd Earl of Warwick, so Gorton and his fellow settlers changed the name of their colony from Shawumet to Warwick.

The ongoing harassment from Massachusetts Bay Colony, however, caused the other three colonies on Narragansett Bay (Providence Plantations, Portsmouth, and Newport) to unite with Warwick and get a British royal charter allowing them to form the Colony of Rhode Island and Providence Plantations.

In 1772, Warwick was the scene of the first violent act against the British Crown in the Gaspee Affair. Local patriots boarded the Gaspee, a revenue cutter that enforced the Stamp Act 1765 and Townshend Acts in Narragansett Bay. It was here that the first blood was spilled in the American Revolution when Gaspee's commanding officer Lt. Dudingston was shot and seriously wounded during the struggle for the ship. The Gaspee was stripped of all cannons and arms, then burned.

During the Revolution, Warwick militiamen participated in the battles of Montreal, Quebec, Saratoga, Monmouth, and Trenton, and they were present for the British surrender at Yorktown in 1781.

== Transportation ==
Major traversing highways include:

- Interstate 95
- Interstate 295
- Route 37
- T. F. Green Airport Connector Road

Interstate 95 is the major thoroughfare of Rhode Island, with the first southbound exit in Warwick at Jefferson Boulevard, and ending with the Route 117 interchange, near the Apponaug rotaries. Interstate 295 connects to the main highway at exit 27, providing direct travel to Woonsocket and Massachusetts. Smaller routes include Route 37 (Lincoln Avenue Freeway) connecting 295 to U.S. Route 1, and the Airport Connector Road.

The Rhode Island T. F. Green International Airport is the main airport serving Rhode Island, and is located in Warwick. The name was changed from T.F. Green Airport in 2021. T. F. Green Airport is a station on the Providence/Stoughton Commuter Rail Line, providing weekday service to Providence Station and Boston's South Station. Being the location of Rhode Island's sole commercial airport, the City of Warwick is colloquially referred to as "Airport City", though this moniker is highly localized and is seldom heard in other parts of the state further from the airport.

== Climate ==
Climate data for Providence, Rhode Island (T. F. Green Airport), 1991–2020 normals, (Note: Mean monthly maxima and minima (i.e. the expected highest and lowest temperature readings at any point during the year or given month) calculated based on data at said location from 1991 to 2020.) extremes 1904–present (Note: Official records for Providence kept at downtown from November 1904 to May 1932 and at T. F. Green Airport since June 1932.)
Month	Jan	Feb	Mar	Apr	May	Jun	Jul	Aug	Sep	Oct	Nov	Dec	Year
Record high °F (°C)	70 (21)	72 (22)	90 (32)	98 (37)	96 (36)	100 (38)	102 (39)	104 (40)	100 (38)	88 (31)	81 (27)	77 (25)	104 (40)
Mean maximum °F (°C)	58.7 (14.8)	57.9 (14.4)	67.1 (19.5)	79.3 (26.3)	87.2 (30.7)	91.5 (33.1)	94.8 (34.9)	92.7 (33.7)	87.6 (30.9)	78.9 (26.1)	70.1 (21.2)	61.5 (16.4)	96.6 (35.9)
Mean daily maximum °F (°C)	38.3 (3.5)	40.5 (4.7)	47.7 (8.7)	58.9 (14.9)	68.9 (20.5)	77.7 (25.4)	83.6 (28.7)	82.2 (27.9)	74.8 (23.8)	63.8 (17.7)	53.2 (11.8)	43.4 (6.3)	61.1 (16.2)
Daily mean °F (°C)	30.2 (−1.0)	32.0 (0.0)	38.9 (3.8)	49.3 (9.6)	59.1 (15.1)	68.2 (20.1)	74.4 (23.6)	73.0 (22.8)	65.6 (18.7)	54.4 (12.4)	44.5 (6.9)	35.5 (1.9)	52.1 (11.2)
Mean daily minimum °F (°C)	22.1 (−5.5)	23.5 (−4.7)	30.2 (−1.0)	39.6 (4.2)	49.2 (9.6)	58.8 (14.9)	65.2 (18.4)	63.9 (17.7)	56.5 (13.6)	45.1 (7.3)	35.8 (2.1)	27.6 (−2.4)	43.1 (6.2)
Mean minimum °F (°C)	4.1 (−15.5)	7.4 (−13.7)	15.1 (−9.4)	28.5 (−1.9)	38.1 (3.4)	47.2 (8.4)	56.2 (13.4)	54.3 (12.4)	43.1 (6.2)	31.7 (−0.2)	21.8 (−5.7)	12.3 (−10.9)	2.0 (−16.7)
Record low °F (°C)	−13 (−25)	−17 (−27)	1 (−17)	11 (−12)	29 (−2)	39 (4)	48 (9)	40 (4)	32 (0)	20 (−7)	6 (−14)	−12 (−24)	−17 (−27)
Average precipitation inches (mm)	3.96 (101)	3.44 (87)	4.90 (124)	4.29 (109)	3.37 (86)	3.81 (97)	2.91 (74)	3.59 (91)	4.17 (106)	4.18 (106)	4.27 (108)	4.65 (118)	47.54 (1,208)
Average snowfall inches (cm)	10.3 (26)	10.5 (27)	6.4 (16)	0.6 (1.5)	0.0 (0.0)	0.0 (0.0)	0.0 (0.0)	0.0 (0.0)	0.0 (0.0)	0.2 (0.51)	1.0 (2.5)	7.6 (19)	36.6 (93)
Average precipitation days (≥ 0.01 in)	11.2	10.3	11.6	11.7	12.2	10.8	9.3	9.1	9.1	10.2	9.6	11.9	127.0
Average snowy days (≥ 0.1 in)	5.7	5.4	3.7	0.4	0.0	0.0	0.0	0.0	0.0	0.1	0.6	3.4	19.3
Average relative humidity (%)	63.9	63.0	62.9	61.4	66.6	70.1	71.0	72.5	73.0	70.2	68.9	67.0	67.5
Average dew point °F (°C)	16.3 (−8.7)	17.4 (−8.1)	25.0 (−3.9)	33.1 (0.6)	45.0 (7.2)	55.6 (13.1)	61.5 (16.4)	61.0 (16.1)	53.8 (12.1)	42.6 (5.9)	33.3 (0.7)	22.1 (−5.5)	38.9 (3.8)
Mean monthly sunshine hours	171.7	172.6	215.6	225.1	254.9	274.1	290.6	262.8	233.0	208.7	148.0	148.6	2,605.7
Percentage possible sunshine	58	58	58	56	57	60	63	61	62	61	50	52	58
Average ultraviolet index	1	2	4	6	7	8	8	8	6	4	2	1	5
Source 1: NOAA (relative humidity, dew point, and sun 1961–1990)
Source 2: Weather Atlas

Climate data for Providence
Month	Jan	Feb	Mar	Apr	May	Jun	Jul	Aug	Sep	Oct	Nov	Dec	Year
Average sea temperature °F (°C)	41.4 (5.2)	38.1 (3.4)	38.7 (3.8)	44.1 (6.7)	50.9 (10.5)	59.6 (15.3)	67.0 (19.4)	69.3 (20.7)	66.7 (19.3)	61.6 (16.4)	54.2 (12.3)	47.7 (8.8)	53.3 (11.8)
Source: Weather Atlas

== Geography ==
Warwick is located at 41°43′N 71°25′W (41.7181, −71.4152).

According to the United States Census Bureau, the city has a total area of 49.6 square miles (128 km^{2}), of which 35.5 square miles (92 km^{2}) is land and 14.1 square miles (37 km^{2}) (28.46%) is water. Warwick's entire eastern edge is waterfront, starting with the Providence River at its northern border with Cranston. Conimicut Point marks the end of the river and the beginning of Narragansett Bay, which extends beyond the city's southern limit on its way to the Atlantic Ocean; two southern Warwick peninsulas, Warwick Neck and Potowomut, enclose the water to form Greenwich Bay.

Warwick is bordered by Cranston to the north, West Warwick to the west, and East Greenwich to the south. The city's southernmost neighborhood, Potowomut, is a semi-exclave, reachable by land only by passing through East Greenwich; through Potowomut, Warwick also shares a border with North Kingstown. Because of the North Kingstown border, Warwick borders two Rhode Island counties: Providence County and Washington County.

The following villages are located in Warwick:

- Apponaug
- Arnold's Neck
- Brush Neck Cove
- Buttonwoods
- Cedar Tree Point
- Chepiwanoxet
- Coles
- Conimicut
- Cowesett
- Duby Grove
- East Natick
- Gaspee Point
- Greenwood
- Governor Francis Farms
- Hillsgrove
- Hoxsie
- Lakewood
- Lincoln Park
- Nausauket
- Natick
- Norwood
- Oakland Beach
- Old Buttonwoods
- Pawtuxet Village (also in Cranston)
- Pocasset
- Pontiac (also in Cranston)
- Potowomut
- Riverview
- Shawomet
- Warwick Neck
- Wildes Corner

== Demographics ==
Historical population
Census	Pop.	Note	%±
1830	5,529		—
1840	6,726		21.6%
1850	7,740		15.1%
1860	8,916		15.2%
1870	10,453		17.2%
1880	12,164		16.4%
1890	17,761		46.0%
1900	21,316		20.0%
1910	26,629		24.9%
1920	13,481		−49.4%
1930	23,196		72.1%
1940	28,757		24.0%
1950	43,028		49.6%
1960	68,504		59.2%
1970	83,694		22.2%
1980	87,123		4.1%
1990	85,427		−1.9%
2000	85,808		0.4%
2010	82,672		−3.7%
2020	82,823		0.2%
U.S. Decennial Census

=== 2020 census ===
As of the 2020 census, Warwick had a population of 82,823, 36,555 households, and 21,150 families. The population density was 2,366.3 inhabitants per square mile (913.6/km^{2}). There were 38,625 housing units at an average density of 1,103.5 per square mile (426.1/km^{2}); 5.4% of those units were vacant, with a homeowner vacancy rate of 1.2% and a rental vacancy rate of 5.2%. There were 36,555 households, of which 22.5% had children under the age of 18 living in them; 42.6% were married-couple households, 18.6% were households with a male householder and no spouse or partner present, and 30.5% were households with a female householder and no spouse or partner present. About 33.8% of all households were made up of individuals and 16.2% had someone living alone who was 65 years of age or older. The average household size was 2.3 and the average family size was 2.9. The percent of those with a bachelor's degree or higher was estimated to be 25.3% of the population. 16.9% of the population was under the age of 18, 6.7% from 18 to 24, 25.1% from 25 to 44, 29.4% from 45 to 64, and 21.9% who were 65 years of age or older. The median age was 46.0 years. For every 100 females there were 92.0 males, and for every 100 females age 18 and over there were 89.0 males. 99.7% of residents lived in urban areas, while 0.3% lived in rural areas. The 2016–2020 five-year American Community Survey estimates show that the median household income was $73,285 (with a margin of error of +/- $2,534) and the median family income was $90,027 (+/- $4,102). Males had a median income of $51,057 (+/- $1,899) versus $39,959 (+/- $1,627) for females. Approximately, 3.8% of families and 7.2% of the population were below the poverty line, including 7.0% of those under the age of 18 and 9.2% of those ages 65 or over.

Racial composition as of the 2020 census
Race	Number	Percent
White	70,967	85.7%
Black or African American	1,751	2.1%
American Indian and Alaska Native	252	0.3%
Asian	2,575	3.1%
Native Hawaiian and Other Pacific Islander	13	0.0%
Some other race	2,138	2.6%
Two or more races	5,127	6.2%
Hispanic or Latino (of any race)	5,019	6.1%

=== 2010 census ===
Warwick is officially a part of the Providence metropolitan area, which has a population of 1,600,852 in the 2010 census.

== Government ==
Warwick town vote by party in presidential elections
Year	GOP	DEM	Others
2024	44.80% 20,602	52.60% 24,186	2.60% 1,196
2020	42.20% 19,578	55.70% 25,845	2.19% 1,018
2016	44.25% 18,338	48.35% 20,038	7.39% 3,064
2012	37.21% 15,027	60.54% 24,448	2.24% 905
2008	38.37% 16,541	59.85% 25,802	1.79% 770
2004	41.02% 16,640	57.10% 23,164	1.87% 760
2000	32.37% 12,741	60.85% 23,948	6.78% 2,669
1996	26.83% 10,414	59.64% 23,152	13.53% 5,254
1992	29.88% 13,348	45.90% 20,504	24.22% 10,822
1988	45.29% 18,052	54.34% 21,662	0.37% 149

Warwick is split into three districts in the Rhode Island Senate which are currently held by Democrats Michael McCaffrey (District 29), Jeanine Calkin (District 30), and Kendra Anderson (District 31). The town is a part of Rhode Island's 2nd congressional district, which is currently represented by Democrat Seth Magaziner. It is traditionally Democratic in presidential elections; no Republican has carried it in over three decades.

== Economy ==
It is considered part of the Pawtuxet River Valley. Before its dissolution, Eckerd Corporation had its headquarters in Warwick.

The ten largest employers in Warwick are Kent Memorial Hospital, Citizens Bank- Warwick Call Center, UPS, MetLife, City of Warwick, Leviton Manufacturing, Wal-Mart, Community College of Rhode Island, J.C. Penney, Kenney Manufacturing, and Inskip Automall.

== Notable people ==
- Bill Almon, MLB player who attended Warwick Veterans Memorial High School
- Rocco Baldelli, MLB player and Minnesota Twins manager who attended Bishop Hendricken High School
- John Belluso, playwright
- Brenda Bennett, musician and former member of Vanity 6, born in Warwick
- Clarence Otis Bigelow, pharmacist and banker
- John Brown, American merchant and participant in the Gaspee Affair; Brown University is named for him
- Vanessa Carlton, musician
- Marnee Carpenter, actress
- Liam Coen, American football coach, head coach of the Jacksonville Jaguars
- Kate Fagan, sports journalist
- Ray Harrington, comedian
- Thomas Holden, American general and Rhode Island Supreme Court justice
- John Hynes, Head coach of the NHL Nashville Predators; born in Warwick
- Thomas P. Knox (1818–1889), physician, abolitionist; born in Warwick
- Michaela McManus, actor, best known for roles on One Tree Hill and Law & Order: Special Victims Unit, attended Toll Gate High School
- John McNiff, public historian
- Martha McSally, Senator from Arizona (2019–2020), born and raised in Warwick
- Walt Mossberg, personal technology journalist and editor, born and raised in Warwick who attended Pilgrim High School
- Nolan North, voice actor who attended Bishop Hendricken High School
- Nicholas O'Neill (1985–2003), writer, actor, and musician best known as the youngest victim of The Station nightclub fire.
- David Petrarca, notable director of TV, film and theatre including Game of Thrones.
- Dave Shalansky, actor, attended Toll Gate High School
- Joe Shekarchi, Rhode Island Speaker of the House
- Kyle Smith, Vice president of player personnel of the Atlanta Falcons
- Chris Terreri, NHL goalie attended Pilgrim High School
- Dan Wheeler, MLB pitcher attended Pilgrim High School
- Fred Whittingham, NFL player and coach, attended Warwick Veterans Memorial High School
- James Woods, actor, attended Pilgrim High School in 1965

== Education ==
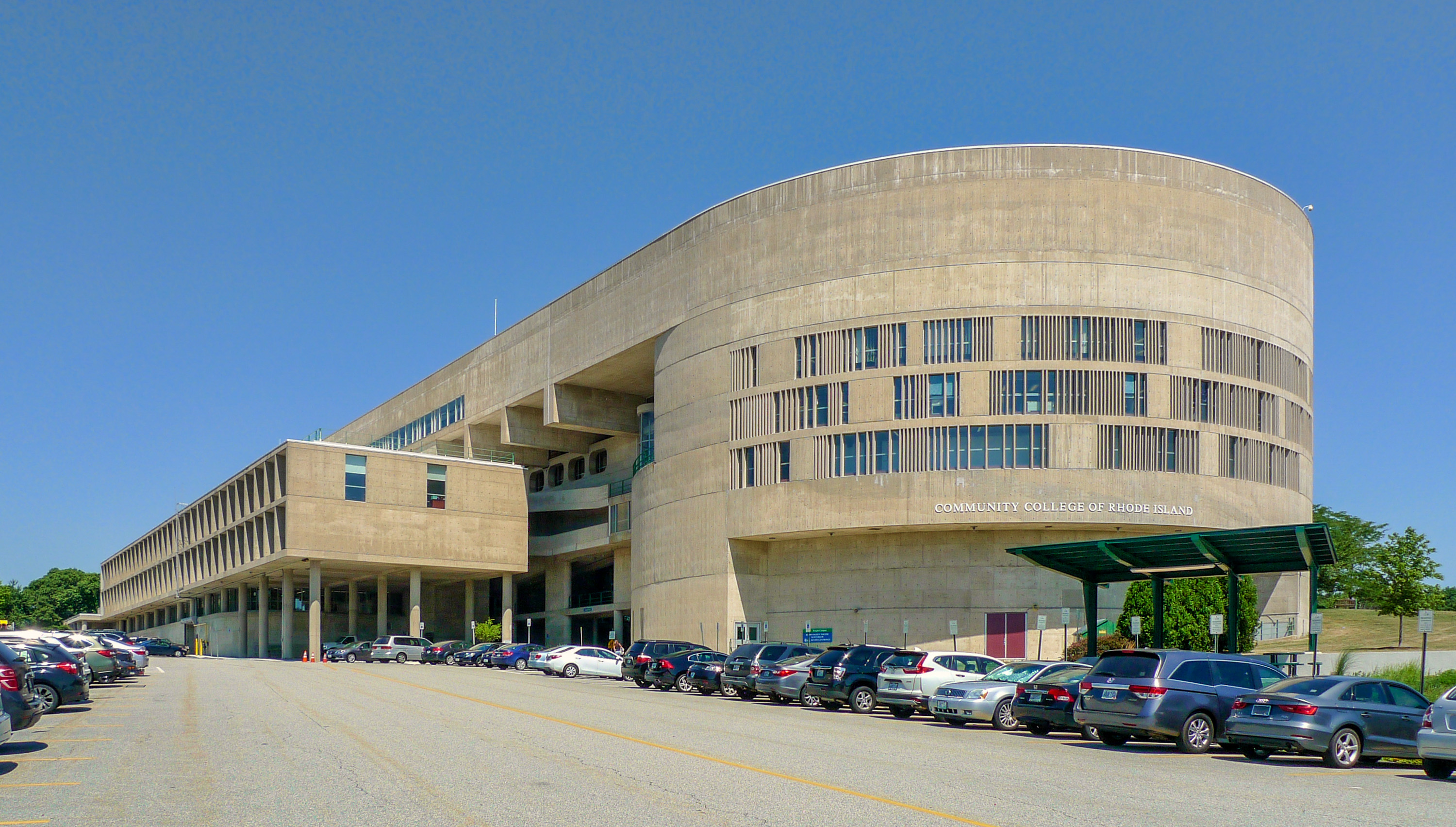
The Knight Campus building of the Community College of Rhode Island

Local public schools are operated by Warwick Public Schools. Toll Gate High School and Pilgrim High School are the two comprehensive public high schools located in Warwick. The high schools are set for renovations in March 2025, a year after the city council issued a $350 million bond to rebuild them. The two public middle schools are Winman Junior High School and Warwick Veterans Junior High School. Aldrich Junior High School and Gorton Junior High School closed in 2016 as part of the school consolidation project. The school department is headed by superintendent Lynn Dambruch.

Bishop Hendricken High School is an all-male college preparatory Catholic high school located in Warwick. Rocky Hill School is a Pre-K–12 co-ed secular country day school located on Warwick's isolated Potowomut peninsula. The school lists an East Greenwich address, despite being geographically included as part of the city of Warwick.

The Community College of Rhode Island Knight Campus is also located in Warwick on the former Knight Estate.
