= Rhode Island T. F. Green International Airport =

Airport serving Providence, Rhode Island, United States

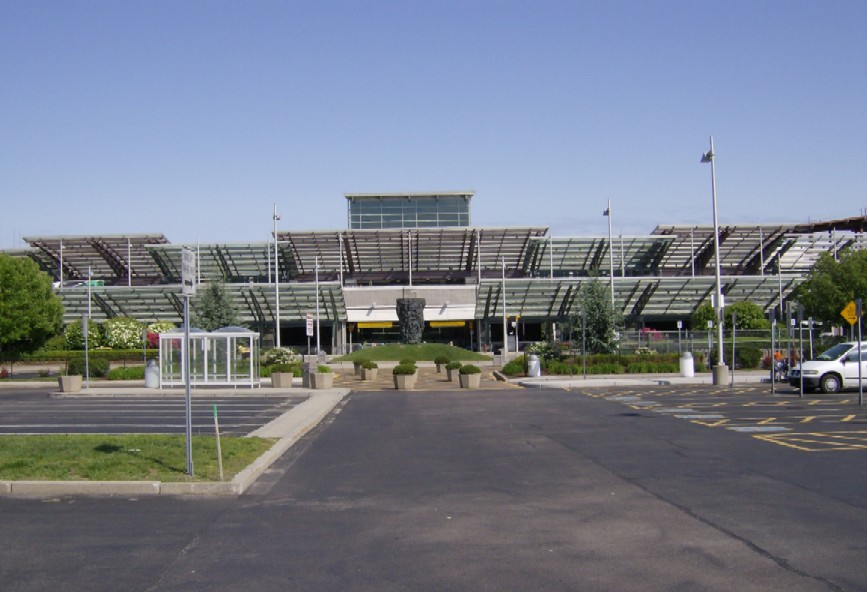
- IATA: PVD; ICAO: KPVD; FAA LID: PVD; WMO: 72507

Summary
- Airport type: Public
- Owner: State of Rhode Island
- Operator: Rhode Island Airport Corporation
- Serves: State of Rhode Island, Southern Greater Boston
- Location: 2000 Post Road; Warwick, Rhode Island; U.S.
- Opened: September 27, 1931; 95 years ago
- Hub for: Wiggins Airways
- Operating base for: Breeze Airways
- Occupants: United States Army Air Forces (1942–1945)
- Time zone: EST (UTC−05:00:00)
  - Summer (DST): EDT (UTC−04:00:00)
- Elevation AMSL: 55 ft (17 m)
- Coordinates: 41.724°N 71.429°W
- Public transit access: T. F. Green Airport/Warwick via Interlink
- Website: flyri.com

Maps
- FAA diagram
- Interactive map of Rhode Island T. F. Green International Airport

Runways
Direction	Length		Surface
Direction	ft	m	Surface
5/23	8,700	2,652	Asphalt
16/34	6,081	1,853	Asphalt

Statistics (2025)
- Aircraft operations: 41,740
- Total passengers: 4,281,388 ▲6.7%
- Source: Federal Aviation Administration, U.S. Department of Transportation

Rhode Island T. F. Green International Airport (IATA: PVD, ICAO: KPVD, FAA LID: PVD) is a public international airport in Warwick, Rhode Island, United States, 6 miles (5.2 nmi; 9.7 km) south of the state's capital and largest city of Providence. Opened in 1931, the airport was named for former Rhode Island governor and longtime senator Theodore Francis Green. Rebuilt in 1996, the renovated main terminal was named for former Rhode Island governor Bruce Sundlun. It is the first state-owned airport in the United States.

The Federal Aviation Administration (FAA) National Plan of Integrated Airport Systems for 2023–2027 categorized it as a small-hub primary commercial service facility.

PVD covers an area of 1,111 acres (450 ha) and has two runways. The airport is the largest and most active airport among the six operated by the Rhode Island Airport Corporation (RIAC). It is estimated the T.F. Green aerodrome has a potential serviceable market of some 7.5 million persons living within roughly 90-minutes of the airport.

== History ==
T. F. Green Airport was dedicated on September 27, 1931, as Hillsgrove State Airport, drawing what was at that time the largest crowd to attend a public function in the country. In 1933, the Rhode Island State Airport Terminal was built on Airport Road, then called Occupasstuxet Road. In 1938, the airport was renamed in honor of Green, who had just been elected to the Senate two years earlier. At the time it had three 3,000 ft (910 m) concrete runways. The Army Air Force took control from 1942 to 1945, using it for flight training. The 435th Army Air Force Base Unit was located at the airfield.

A September 1946 diagram shows runways 5, 10 and 16 all 4,000 ft (1,200 m) long; in April 1951 runway 5 was 5,000 ft (1,500 m) and 5R/23L was under construction. A few years later 5R/23L was 5,466 ft (1,666 m), which it remained until extended to 6,466 ft (1,971 m) around 1967. The April 1957 OAG shows 26 weekday departures: 11 Eastern, 10 American, four United, and one National. Nonstops did not reach beyond Boston and Newark until 1959 when Eastern started a DC-7B nonstop to Washington, which was the longest until United started Cleveland in 1968 and Chicago in 1970 and Eastern started Miami in 1969 and Atlanta in 1970. The first jets were Mohawk BAC-111s in 1966.

President Richard Nixon made a campaign stop at the airport on the night of Friday, November 3, 1972. A crowd of 10,000 watched as Nixon, standing on the steps of Air Force One, urged voters to support Republican candidates Herbert F. DeSimone for Governor and John Chafee for U.S. Senator. (Both lost, though Chafee later won the office in 1976.) Air Force One again touched down at T. F. Green on August 30, 1975, this time carrying President Gerald Ford, en route to a fundraiser in Newport. He was greeted by a crowd of about 1,500 supporters, as well as local politicians including Governor Philip W. Noel, Senator John O. Pastore, and Providence Mayor Buddy Cianci.

=== From the 1960s ===
To enhance itself as the lone airport for a metro area of over 1.6 million people, a new terminal was built on Post Road in 1964, replacing the old 1933 terminal along Airport Road. In 1996 this terminal was replaced, expanding to 18 gates, and adding a lower arrival level and an upper departure level. In 1997 four gates were added. Airlines added flights to T. F. Green Airport, including Air Canada, Southwest, SATA International (which operated flights to the Azores using an A310-300), and Spirit Airlines.

After the September 11 attacks in 2001, T. F. Green Airport, like most airports in the United States, faced a temporary decrease in passengers and fewer flights from American Airlines (which once flew to Chicago O'Hare and Dallas/Fort Worth Airport), Spirit, and SATA. The decrease in service was especially severe to Chicago O'Hare as between both United and American decreased the number of one-way daily seats from nearly a combined 1,400 to today's 225 daily one-way seats. Nine flights of 727, 737, 757 and MD-80 service downgraded to today's regional jet use. Since the HNTB-designed Bruce Sundlun Terminal opened in 1996, T. F. Green became more congested due to increased traffic and post-9/11 security changes. Renovations followed, including expansion of baggage rooms to accommodate a new In-Line Explosive Detection System (EDS) Baggage Handling System, expanded security screening checkpoints, more concessions and ticket counters, and expansion of RIAC offices on the second and third floors.

As part of a 2001 Master Plan, the FAA's Runway runway incursion action team (visiting in 2000) made a few recommendations including the closing of runway 5L/23R and converting it into a taxiway.

Traffic increased to a high of 5.7 million passengers in 2005, while at the same time Boston Logan was handling 25 million passengers. After 2005, airlines started consolidating service at larger airports by withdrawing service and reducing frequencies at mid-sized hubs and small-sized hubs. Airports such as T. F. Green, Jacksonville, Bradley, etc. were affected. The recession and Boston Logan's proximity to the Providence metro area also took its toll on T. F. Green as numbers decreased to 3.5 million in 2015. In 2017 passenger figures grew to just shy of 4 million passengers. With the addition of Amazon Air, which includes its own Prime Jets plus DHL and Atlas Air Jets, cargo numbers increased to nearly 44 million pounds. Amazon moved their cargo service from T. F. Green to Bradley International Airport on August 1, 2018.

T. F. Green was visited by Air Force One on October 25, 2010, a Concorde operated by British Airways on June 13, 1988, and an Airbus A340 flown by Iberia Airlines on June 1, 2011, which transported the Men's Spanish national soccer team for their match against the U.S. National Team on June 4, 2011, at Gillette Stadium in Foxborough, Massachusetts. T. F. Green was visited by Air Force One again on October 31, 2014, carrying President Barack Obama.

From 1998 until 2013, T. F. Green had regular service to Toronto Pearson International Airport first via Air Jazz and then by Air Georgian after 9/11; both did business as express carriers for Air Canada. In the early 1990s Leisure Air provided twice weekly seasonal service to Bermuda. Charters such as North American Air and Buffalo Air handled scheduled charter service to the Azores from the mid-1980s to the early 1990s. SATA International, now known as Azores Airlines, has recently resumed seasonal service to the Azores, having previously offered service until 2010. In 2015, service was announced to Frankfurt, Germany by Condor and Praia, in the Cape Verde islands, by TACV. The Condor service to Frankfurt marked the first non-stop route to mainland Europe from Providence; however, the flight was later suspended for unspecified reasons. February 6, 2017, USA Today announced that Norwegian Air had selected Providence's T. F. Green Airport as its base for flights to Europe. Norwegian Air Shuttle operated from Providence using new Boeing 737 MAX planes for its service to cities in Western Europe, however as of now the service is cut due to the groundings of the aircraft related to its MCAS system. The official announcements were made February 23, 2017, with flights starting to Belfast, Cork, Dublin, Edinburgh and Shannon. Later, flights were added to Bergen in Norway, Pointe-à-Pitre in Guadeloupe, and Fort-de-France in Martinique. These routes were gradually dropped due to poor load factors, and the Boeing 737 MAX grounding. Norwegian's last flight from Providence operated on September 15, 2019.

On October 1, 2017, T. F. Green's runway 5/23 was officially opened for use at its new expanded length of 8,700 feet. Planning on the project began in the 1990s, and work on the expansion began in 2013. The project included demolition of an existing neighborhood, removal of nearby utility poles and trees to clear approach lanes, and moving city park from one side of the airport to the other. Officials were hopeful that a longer runway would attract more longer-range nonstop flights, such as the international routes that Norwegian Air began flying in 2017, as well as enhance safety for short-distance flights, giving pilots more runway to use in the case of poor weather conditions. The runway expansion was desired because, as the Rhode Island Airport Corporation (RIAC) wrote in 2001, the master plan completed in 1997 failed to envision the "tremendous growth" that T. F. Green experienced. The report identified the lack of runway length as a hindrance to "range and diversity of service", in particular emphasizing ability to reach non-hub cities, the west coast, and international locations. Challenges for T. F. Green in expanding the runway were the residential and commercial developments around it. Many residents opposed the expansion.

In 2017, T. F. Green was named the official airport of the New England Patriots. In 2017 the airport had 74,561 aircraft operations, average 204 per day: 50% scheduled commercial, 14% air taxi, 35% general aviation and <1% military. Thirty-three aircraft were then based at this airport: 55% single-engine, 9% multi-engine, 30% jet and 6% helicopter. In 2017 T. F. Green handled about 3.937 million passengers. The mainline airline with the largest presence at T. F. Green is Southwest, which carried 45.07% of all passengers in 2017, followed by American with 13.65%. T. F. Green also handled over 43,500,000 pounds (19,700,000 kg) of cargo and mail in 2017.

=== Name change ===
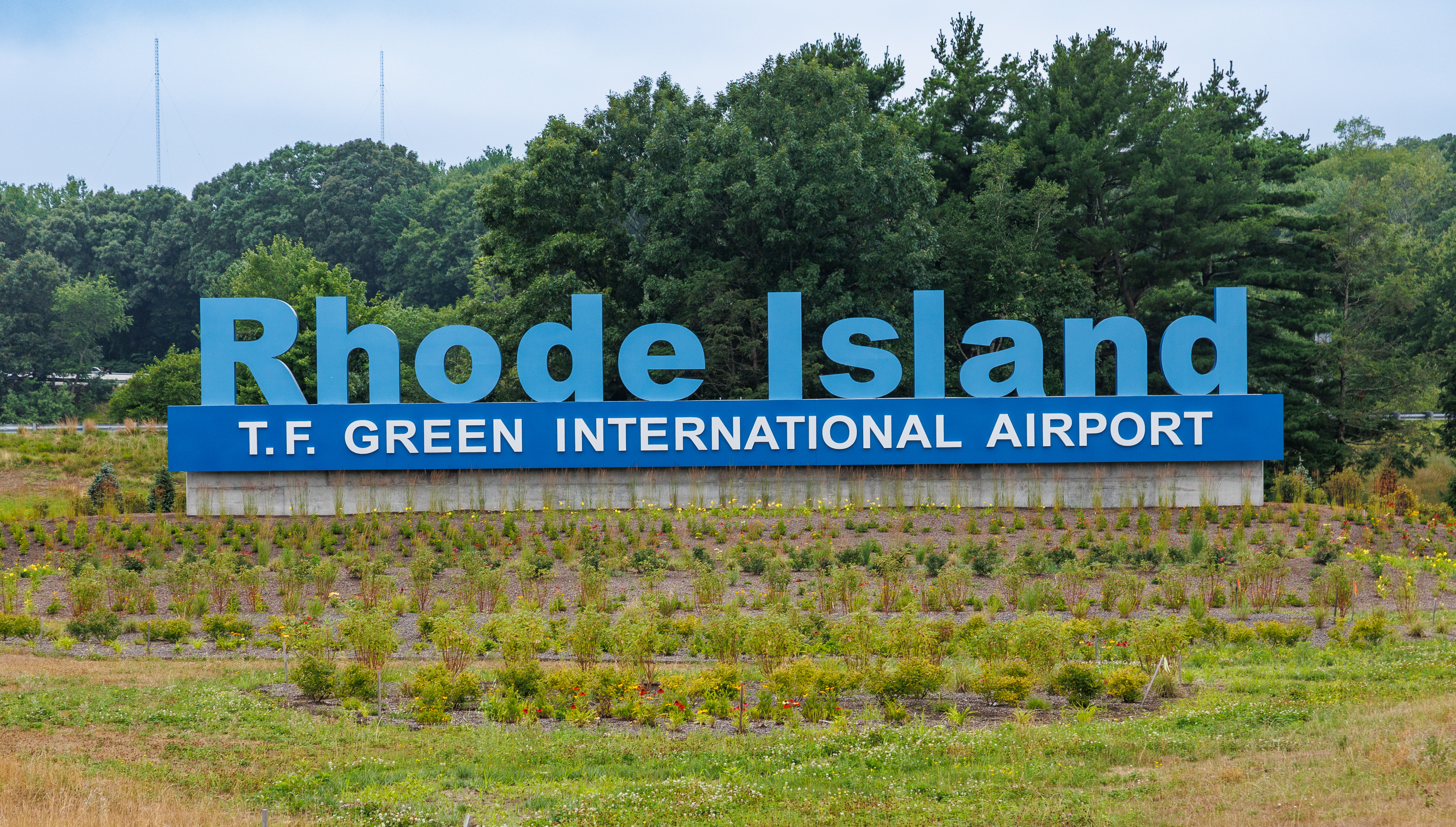
One of two 10-foot-tall signs erected in 2024

In February 2018, the Rhode Island Airport Corporation (RIAC) formally petitioned the state legislature to change the name of the airport to "Rhode Island International Airport". RIAC believed the name change would both reflect the airport's international flight presence and better describe the location it serves. A bill introduced that month, H7673A, was not adopted.

In 2021, revised proposal H6051, which would change the airport's name to "Rhode Island T.F. Green International Airport", was passed by the Rhode Island House of Representatives on May 11. The proposal was approved by the Rhode Island Senate the following month. In June 2021, the airport's name was officially changed. In April 2024, two ten-foot tall signs were installed along Interstate 95 with the new name.

== Facilities ==
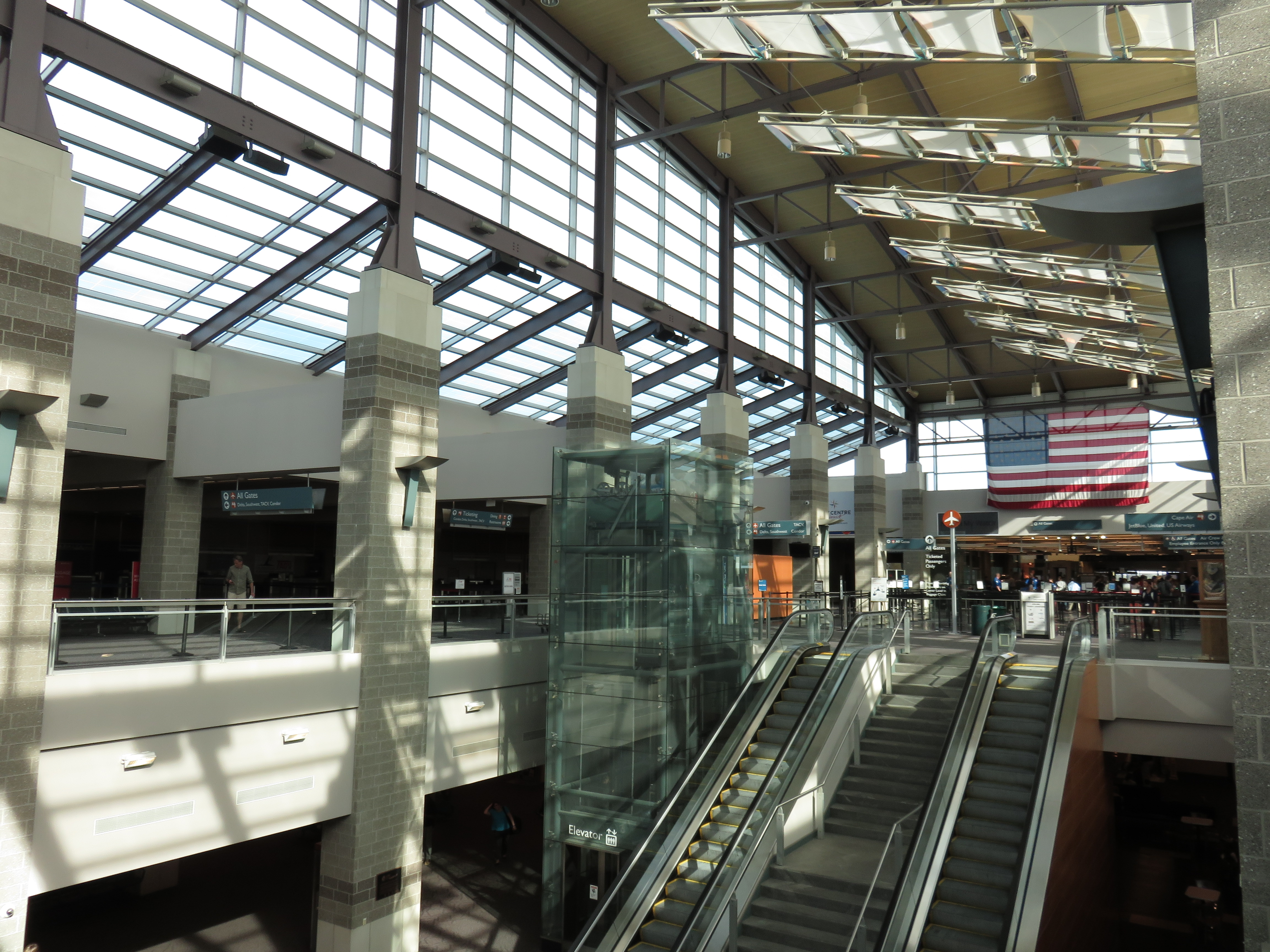
Terminal lobby

Table I.5-3, Runway Data, T.F. Green Airport.
Runway	Length (ft)	Width (ft)	Approach Aids	Approach Lighting	Lighting	Marking
5R-23L	7166	150			HIRL	Precision
5L-23R	4432	75	(VASI)			Visual
16-34	6081	150				Precision

=== Terminal ===
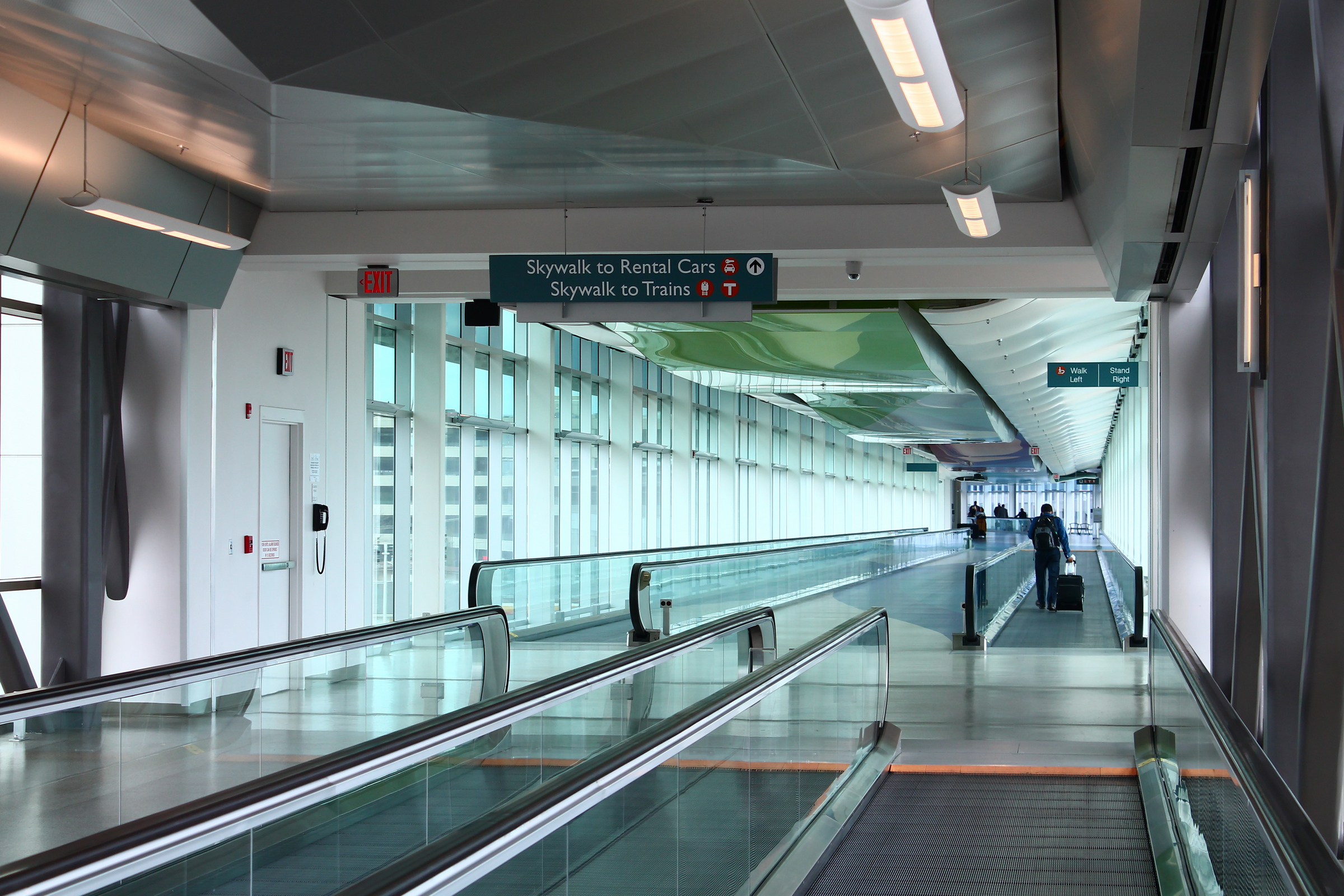
Skywalk

The airport's terminal, named for former Rhode Island governor Bruce Sundlun, has two concourses, North and South. The South Concourse has eight gates and the North Concourse has 14 gates. Seven and Eight are designed for international arrivals and are directly connected to customs, which is on the lower level of the concourse. The terminal contains stores, restaurants, and a central food court.

=== Ground transportation ===
The airport is located directly adjacent to the Northeast Corridor and is connected to T. F. Green Airport station served by the MBTA on the Providence/Stoughton Line. The station was constructed in October 2010 and opened in November 2011, and includes an elevated walkway to the terminal, a rental car garage, and a large parking area. Upon opening in December 2010, the station saw limited service to Providence and Boston. In 2011, train service was expanded to 10 daily round trips, and in 2012 service was extended south when Wickford Junction opened. Travel time to South Station in Boston is about 85 minutes, while the travel times to both Providence and to Wickford Junction are about 15 minutes. Amtrak does not stop at the station; however, the state has long-studied the feasibility of a stop and is currently conducting a preliminary engineering study.

T. F. Green Airport has direct access to I-95 via the T. F. Green Airport Connector Road, a 1.1-mile (1.8 km) freeway. The airport is served by major car rental companies as well as by local taxi and limousine services.

The Rhode Island Public Transit Authority (RIPTA) offers public bus transportation to and from the cities of Providence (Kennedy Plaza in downtown Providence) and Newport.

== Airlines and destinations ==
=== Passenger ===
Airlines	Destinations
Allegiant Air	Nashville, Punta Gorda (FL); Seasonal: Cincinnati, Fort Lauderdale (begins February 13, 2027), Orlando/Sanford (begins February 13, 2027), Sarasota (begins February 13, 2027)
American Airlines	Charlotte; Seasonal: Chicago–O'Hare, Philadelphia, Washington–National
American Eagle	Charlotte, Chicago–O'Hare, Philadelphia, Washington–National
Breeze Airways	Charleston (SC), Daytona Beach, Fort Myers, Greenville/Spartanburg, Jacksonville (FL), Myrtle Beach, Norfolk, Orlando, Pittsburgh, Raleigh/Durham, Richmond, Sarasota, Savannah, Tampa, Vero Beach, Wilmington (NC); Seasonal: Cincinnati, Denver, Los Angeles
Cabo Verde Airlines	Praia, Sal
Delta Air Lines	Atlanta; Seasonal: Minneapolis/St. Paul
Delta Connection	Detroit
JetBlue	Fort Lauderdale, New York–JFK, Orlando, West Palm Beach; Seasonal: San Juan
Southwest Airlines	Baltimore, Chicago–Midway, Nashville, Orlando, Tampa, Washington–National; Seasonal: Dallas–Love, Denver, Fort Lauderdale, Fort Myers, West Palm Beach
United Airlines	Chicago–O'Hare
United Express	Chicago–O'Hare, Washington–Dulles

Destinations map
Destinations from T. F. Green Airport (PVD)
Red = Year-round destination
Green = Seasonal destination
Blue = Future destination

International & Puerto Rican destinations map
Rhode Island T. F. Green International Airport (North America)

=== Cargo ===
Airlines	Destinations
FedEx Express	Fort Wayne, Memphis
FedEx Feeder	Martha's Vineyard, Nantucket, Newark
UPS Airlines	Louisville, Philadelphia

== Statistics ==
=== Top destinations ===
Busiest domestic routes from PVD (June 2025 – May 2026)
Rank	Airport	Passengers	Carriers
1	Orlando, Florida	259,030	Breeze, JetBlue, Southwest
2	Baltimore, Maryland	218,090	Southwest
3	Charlotte, North Carolina	180,030	American
4	Washington-National, D.C.	166,580	American, Southwest
5	Atlanta, Georgia	139,920	Delta
6	Chicago–O'Hare, Illinois	121,540	American, United
7	Chicago-Midway, Illinois	89,040	Southwest
8	Philadelphia, Pennsylvania	82,630	American
9	Tampa, Florida	81,600	Breeze, Southwest
10	Fort Lauderdale, Florida	73,410	JetBlue, Southwest

=== Top airlines ===
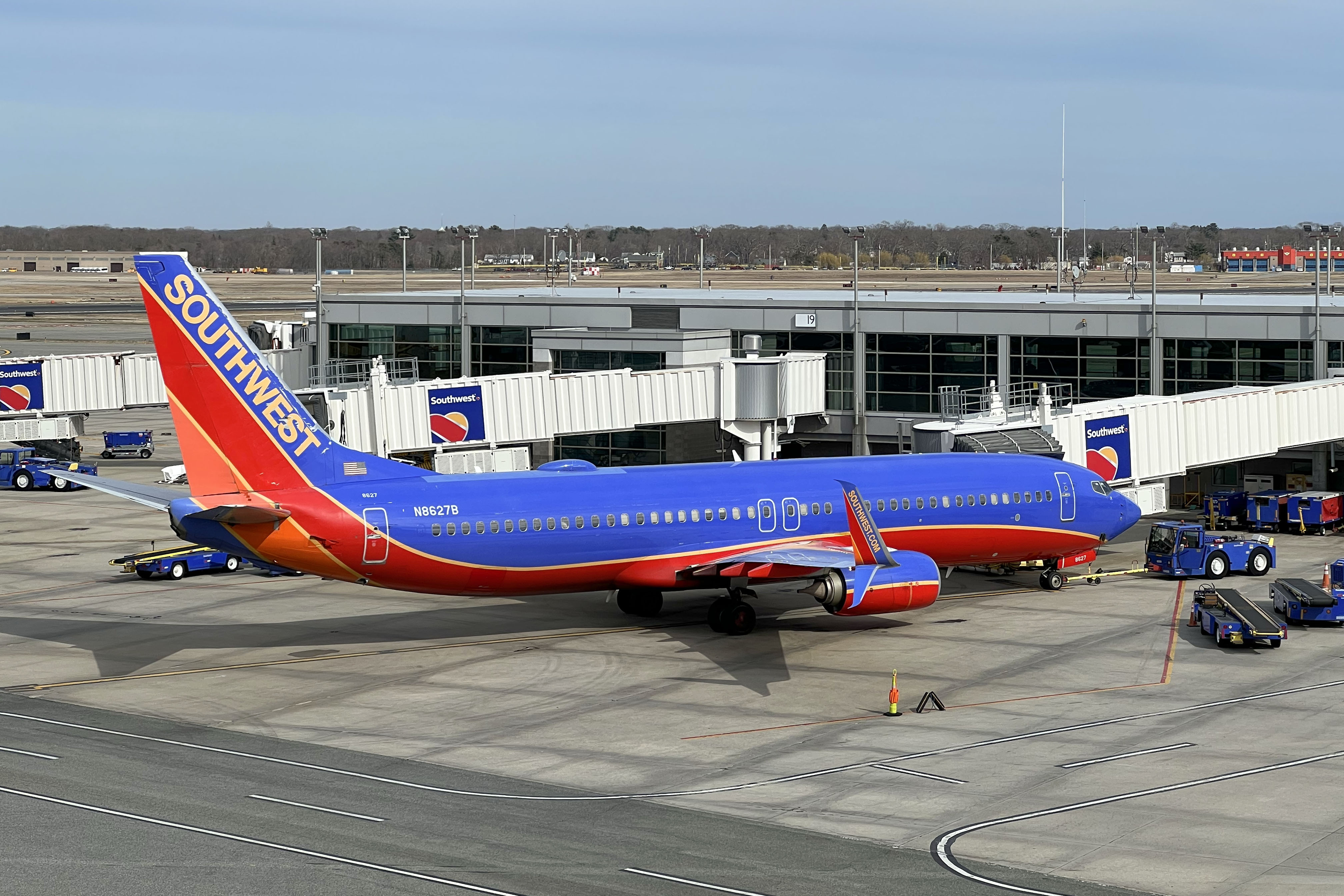
A Southwest Airlines Boeing 737-800 at T. F. Green International Airport

Largest airlines at PVD (June 2025 – May 2026)
Rank	Airline	Passengers	Share
1	Southwest Airlines	1,231,000	29.76%
2	Breeze Airways	695,000	16.79%
3	JetBlue	647,000	15.63%
4	American Airlines	570,000	13.78%
5	Delta Air Lines	321,000	7.75%
-	Other	674,000	16.30%

=== Annual traffic ===
Annual passenger traffic at PVD 2002–present
Year	Passengers	Year	Passengers	Year	Passengers
2002	5,393,574	2012	3,650,737	2022	3,171,929
2003	5,176,271	2013	3,803,586	2023	3,515,549
2004	5,509,186	2014	3,566,769	2024	4,011,681
2005	5,730,557	2015	3,566,105	2025	4,281,388
2006	5,204,191	2016	3,653,029	2026	
2007	5,019,342	2017	3,937,947	2027	
2008	4,692,974	2018	4,298,345	2028	
2009	4,328,741	2019	3,989,925	2029	
2010	3,936,423	2020	1,311,597	2030	
2011	3,883,548	2021	2,334,295	2031	

== Accidents and incidents ==
=== 1999 runway incursion ===
On December 6, 1999, at approximately 20:35 (-05:00), a runway incursion occurred involving United Airlines Flight 1448 (a Boeing 757) and FedEx Express Flight 1662 (a Boeing 727) on Runway 5R/23L. Shortly after landing on Runway 5R, United 1448 was instructed by the air traffic control tower to taxi to the gate, part of the instructions including crossing Runway 16. Due to the low-visibility conditions that night, the pilots became disoriented and turned down the wrong taxiway, which led them back towards the active runway they had just arrived on. The tower controller, unaware of United's mistake, cleared FedEx 1662 for takeoff on Runway 5R. United 1448 then confirmed with the controller that they should cross the runway in front of them. Neither party was aware that they were actually at the intersection of Runway 16 and 5R/23L instead of Runway 16 and 5L/23R. The aircraft proceeded to move towards Runway 5R/23L.

United 1448, sounding confused, then radioed that they were near taxiway Kilo, and as they re-entered Runway 5R/23L, reported that "somebody just took off" overhead, referring to FedEx 1662 that had indeed just become airborne in very close proximity to the United aircraft. However, the controller appeared not to take this seriously, stating, "you shouldn't be anywhere near Kilo", and advised the United 1448 crew to hold position. United 1448 informed the tower that they were now on an active runway, which they mistakenly believed to be 23R/5L (inactive at the time). A moment later the pilot corrected himself, stating that they were on 5R/23L. United 1448's crew was told again to stand by, so the aircraft remained idle at the intersection of the active runway, while the controller cleared MetroJet 2998 for takeoff on the same runway. The United 1448 pilot immediately interjected to insist that the plane was on the active runway, which the controller denied, saying it was not an active runway. Meanwhile, the MetroJet pilot, having heard the exchange, realized there was confusion over the whereabouts of United 1448 and refused the takeoff clearance, stating, "We're staying clear of all runways until we figure this out."

Despite all this confusion, the controller again cleared MetroJet 2998 for takeoff on Runway 5R. They again refused to accept the clearance for take-off until the United 1448 was confirmed to have arrived at the gate. Once United 1448 was confirmed to be at the gate, MetroJet 2998 finally departed on Runway 5R.

The US Airways crew operating MetroJet Flight 2998 were praised by a US Air spokesperson for their actions of avoiding a disaster. An investigation by the National Transportation Safety Board followed and while no fault was assigned to the controller, she was required to undergo retraining before returning to service. The pilots were debriefed by United, received additional training and were returned to service.

Part of the confusion was due to United 1448's inability to correctly identify the runway they were on. During the radio exchanges, United 1448 refers to 23L/5R as 23R/5L and vice versa. Runway 23R/5L has been closed since this incident and is now taxiway Victor.

=== 2007 CRJ accident ===
On December 16, 2007, Air Wisconsin (US Airways Express) flight 3758, a CRJ-200 arriving from Philadelphia, departed the left side of runway 5 after a hard landing by an unstabilized approach. Although the aircraft sustained substantial damage, none of the 31 passengers and crew aboard were injured. The aircraft was repaired and placed back into service.

== Awards ==
In 2022, a USA Today 10Best Readers’ Choice Travel Award poll ranked T.F. Green airport as third in the United States in the category of small airports.

== See also ==
- List of Class C airports in the United States
