= Greenwich Bay (Rhode Island) =

Bay in Rhode Island, United States

Coordinates: 41°40′28″N 71°24′50″W

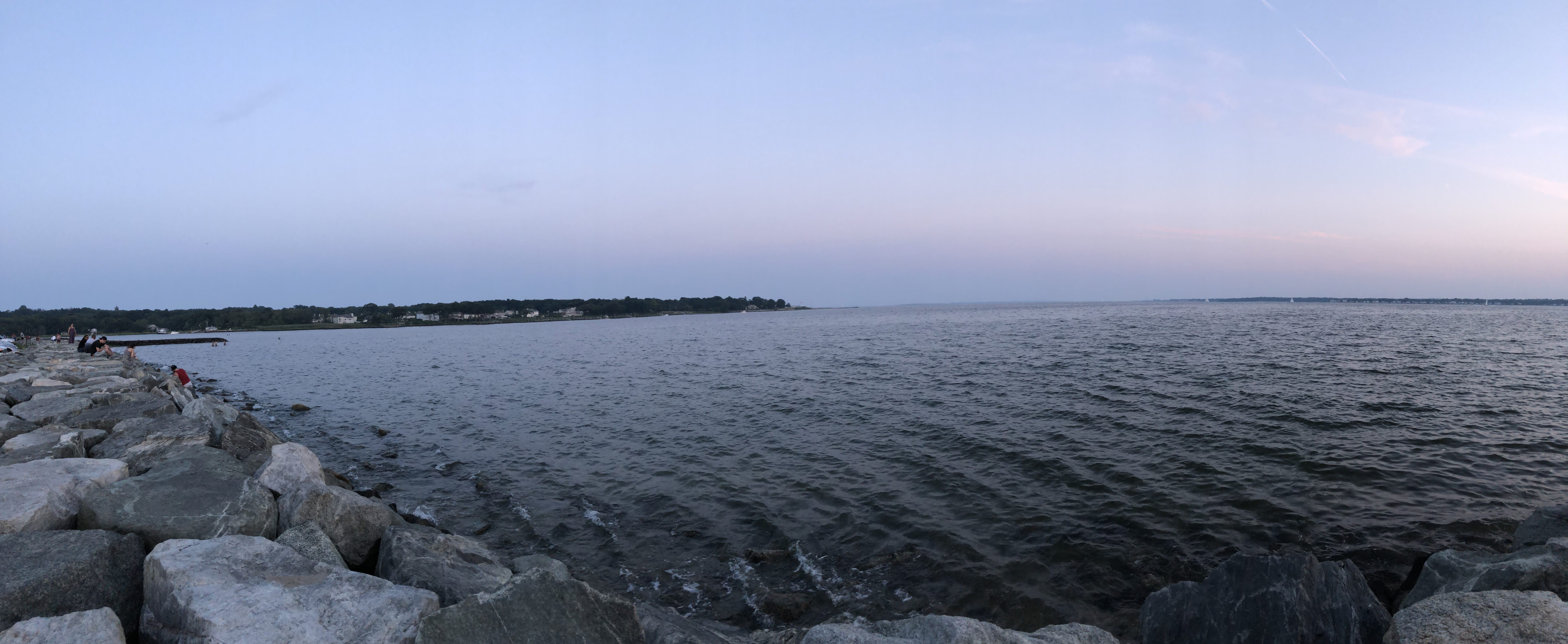
A view of Greenwich Bay from Oakland Beach.

Greenwich Bay, formerly known as "Cowesett Bay," is a bay on the coast of Rhode Island in the United States near Warwick, RI and East Greenwich, Rhode Island off of Narragansett Bay.

The United States Navy seaplane tender USS Greenwich Bay, in commission from 1945 to 1966, was named for the bay.
