= Pilgrim High School =

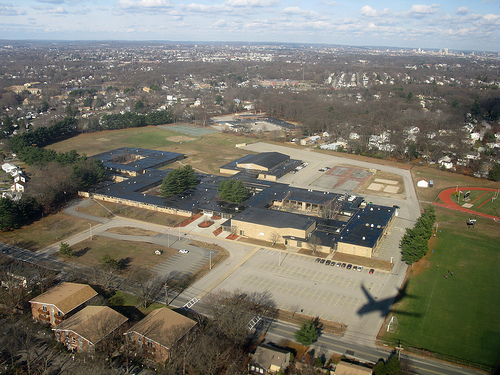
- An aerial view of the school in 2008

Location
- 111 Pilgrim Parkway; Warwick, Rhode Island 02888; United States; 41.746755°N 71.411997°W

Information
- Type: Public
- Established: December 30, 1962
- School district: Warwick Public Schools
- Principal: Toby Gibbons
- Staff: 108.00 (FTE)
- Grades: 9–12
- Enrollment: 1,165 (2023-2024)
- Student to teacher ratio: 10.79
- Color
- Mascot: The Pilgrim Patriot
- Teams: Patriots
- Website: Website

Pilgrim High School (also known as Pilgrim, or PHS) is a suburban high school in the Pilgrim Park neighborhood of Warwick, Rhode Island. It is a part of Warwick Public Schools. The school is single-storied and features multiple hallways for specific subjects. Multiple renovations occurred in the school, most recently in 2016, before the consolidation process began. The school logo is the shape of an American Revolution soldier head formed by the words "Pilgrim High School Patriots", although the letter "P" in the official colors is used for most athletic teams.

It opened during the middle of the 1963 school year to address overcrowding at Warwick Veterans High School, which taught almost four thousand students at the time of opening. Nevertheless, the new establishment eventually became notorious for the double session schedule to alleviate its own excess capacity problem by the late 1960s. Today, Pilgrim has an enrollment of 1,400 students thanks to a consolidation effort by the school department, after years of declining student population.

Pilgrim was historically well-known for sports, most notably the baseball team as they won multiple state championships all through a dynastic period. Most of the school's championships were won throughout the 1970s. In 2010s, the school's athletics entered a renaissance. Although the baseball team's last championship was in 1990, the boys' basketball, unified basketball, competition cheerleading, field hockey, football, gymnastics boys' ice hockey, boys' and girls' lacrosse, boys' and girls' soccer, girls' indoor and outdoor track running, and unified volleyball teams won division championships in the 2010s and 2020s. The football team, after posting only three winning seasons between 1995 and 2018, finally appeared (but lost) in the state's Division III Super Bowl since their latest appearance in 1995.

== History ==
=== Background and opening era (1960s) ===
In the early 1960s, the early baby boom population began entering high school, and the population of Warwick skyrocketed to almost 70,000 residents during the post-war era with the popularity of the suburb. To accommodate the sudden growth of families, in 1955, the city consolidated all of its then-operating high schools at the time into one building, Warwick Veterans High School. The former establishments, Aldrich, Gorton, and Lockwood, were converted into junior high schools. All of them have since closed, with Gorton becoming Warwick Public Schools' main offices in 2016, and Lockwood shuttering in June, 1979, now redeveloped into condominiums.

Overcrowding was still a problem only years after Vets opened, despite serving only three grades. It experimented with staggered schedules for the tenth graders, leading towards a double session schedule shortly after. The overpopulated student body led to the construction of a new high school in the city. It is unknown how the school got its name, but it presumably originates from where the neighborhood the school is located, Pilgrim Park. On December 30, 1962, the school was officially dedicated, and Michael A. Morry was named the first principal. A month later, on January 29, the school opened without delay during a cold winter morning. The big move was efficiently managed, with the Vets secretary going as far as scheduling students in the same classes they had in their previous school. The courtyards full of landscaping were described by one student as "just beautiful", and the cafeteria (once known as the "dining hall") was used to hold delightful dances. Sports teams were already formed, and the gymnasium was prepared to hold its first basketball game.

Still, Pilgrim's student population kept increasing. Morry implemented the double session schedule to avoid cramped conditions at the new school.

=== The golden era (1970–early 90s) ===
Despite the population peaking in the early 1970s, the number of students attending Pilgrim contributed to athletics, and they are responsible for the success of sports teams throughout the decade. In 1968, the boys' cross country team gave the school its first division championship, ushering an era of Pilgrim's dominance in athletics. The following year, the cross country team gave Pilgrim its first state title.

The baseball team was still consistent when they first played in 1963, and in 1970, they won their first championship, the first of five in the decade. In the 1970s, Pilgrim's baseball team had a 110–34 record (a 76.4% win percentage), six division titles, and five state titles starting in 1970, a threepeat from 1972 to 1974, and 1978. Pilgrim lost the championship in 1979, but their power continued until 1984, when the team finished off with a losing record. Although the baseball team in the 1980s was inconsistent with their records, they managed to win the 1980 and 1990 championships. and competed for the 1992 title.

Pilgrim also won championships with other sports teams as well. Boys' cross country continued to win titles through 1987. Ice hockey won three straight division championships from 1974 to 1976, and another in 1990. Football, wrestling, field hockey, boys' indoor track, girls' soccer, girls' tennis, and girls' volleyball were teams also associated with the "golden era".

The famed Morry had the Pilgrim football field dedicated to him. After he retired in 1983, Morry was succeeded by incumbent vice principal Ralph J. Hoffman. However, the latter was named as the school department's hearing officer, and in 1987, he left the school. Edmund B. "Smiley"Miley served as the principal of Pilgrim after Hoffman, a tenure that would last until 2002. He was derisively nicknamed "Smiley" by students due to his serious demeanor.

=== Post-golden era (early 90s–2014) ===
After years of instability, some teams began to emerge from an era where they lacked championships. The baseball team continued to appear in the playoffs, while the girls' cross country team won their first division title. The football team made two appearances in the division championship in 1992 and 1995. Boys' soccer, boys' swimming, girls' basketball, girls' cross country, girls' indoor track, softball, and wrestling are some of the notable teams that won titles in the 1990s to the early 2000s. The school's second track was installed in 1995 to replace the original cinder track, and was used frequently that it showed decrepit conditions twenty years later.

When Miley retired from office, Victor Mercurio (now superintendent of East Greenwich schools) took over duties of overseeing the students of Pilgrim, until he was appointed as the school department's director of secondary education in 2004. Dennis Mullen became the first teacher in the school named principal at Pilgrim, and he won the Outstanding New Principal award by the Rhode Island Association of School Principals. He also earned Principal of the Year in 2010 by the same organization. His tenure ended in 2012 similarly to his predecessor, taking over the job as director of secondary education. Marie Cote (née Johnson) became the school's first female principal, a position she would hold until 2015.

One notable lowlight during Pilgrim's post-golden era included a traffic accident during the 2009 school year. In April that year, fifteen-year old sophomore Kimberly Pisaturo was crossing the street while wearing headphones and looking at her phone, when a school bus transporting students to Providence struck her near the school. The driver, Rebecca Toolin, was unaware of the situation until she pulled over. The victim's family requested privacy due to the tragedy, but a YouTube video was uploaded in memory of her.

Students' disinterest in metalwork helped convert one room from a shop classroom and storage area to a media studio for audiovisual courses as a result of a $95,600 grant by The Champlin Foundations late in 2013. The plan was conceived the previous year when the faculty created a movie and screened it as a fundraising event by the Pilgrim Film Society club. Principal Cote, along with two English teachers, a music teacher, and a technology education teacher, were involved with filling out the application required to acquire the grant. With the money, the budget allowed eight iMac desktops with preloaded applications for appropriate classes, audio and camera equipment, lighting fixtures, microphones, and the like.

==== 1989 acid incident ====
Around that time, drug use was rampant in the lavatories, that an incident involving numerous students occurred on April 6, 1989. The preceding evening, a student, identified as "Student Doe", met with Student A and talked about purchasing LSD. The conversation occurred at Student B's house, though the latter had no knowledge such conversation occurred, but knew Student A was going to get drugs. The next morning, Doe entered the building thirty minutes after the first bell. It was said that Doe visited the lavatory every time before classes, and has no idea why he does so. Meanwhile, Student B witnessed Student A accompanying another student. All three were spooked by a teacher approaching. The student with Student A entered first prior to Doe, and took out a cigarette. Doe went inside the bathroom after, before Students A and B entered. When two other unnamed individuals went inside, the trade commenced. It took approximately five to ten minutes to complete the deal, but out of nowhere, Principal Miley was conducting searches for students hiding in lavatories, and happened to find everyone loitering inside. They were all told to report to the office immediately. After denying that a transaction occurred in the lavatory, Doe received a suspension for tardiness.

Soon after, the student walked to a nearby Mister Donut. One of the students that were with him in the lavatory offered him some acid. The group of students involved then moved on to the McDonald's located in the former Warwick Plaza (now a Walmart), where Doe obtained thirty hits of acid after following instructions of a student that purchased the drug from another person (Student A) that was part of the group in the lavatory. Doe hid the acid in his cigarette pack. Later that day, Doe returned to "B"'s house, where they found out from a classmate that "somebody flipped out at school", and "A"'s father was attempting to find the students involved or his own son. As the father knew "B" was included as part of the group, Doe fled out of the house in fear of uncertain harm.

After an investigation that found several students feeling sick from using drugs that day, Miley recommended the suspension to be extended until April 6, 1990, though the principal had no personal knowledge of Doe's involvement in the drug trade. He stated that it was the first time the student was disciplined for violating school policy on the sale, use, and/or possession of drugs. The incident was reviewed by the Rhode Island Department of Education as John M. Doe v. Warwick School Committee. The findings concluded that a drug transaction did occur in the lavatory, and that Doe lied about not witnessing it. The student was not found as a participant in a conspiracy to sell LSD that day, and was not responsible for Student A's distribution of drugs. On November 8, 1989, the case was decided to have the school expunge Student Doe's disciplinary records relating to the suspension, and to let him return to class.

=== Consolidation era and sports renaissance (2011–present) ===
In late 2011, talks about consolidating Warwick's secondary schools surfaced. The committee reviewed options for the fates of the affected schools, and what strategies the department would apply to benefit unifying them. Some alternatives included closing two junior highs and sending all students to an old senior high, converting to a 7–12 model, or closing only one school. The school department already once considered 7–12 schools in the early 1980s according to a report by local television station WJAR, but faded into insignificance as times passed. The plans were put on hold until 2013, when the department's Long Term Facilities Planning Committee developed scenarios for a five-year plan on the futures of the secondary schools. Pilgrim's student population was one-third than it had in the late 1960s, as 1,021 were attending during the 2014 school year.

The following year, the school committee decided to close Aldrich and Gorton junior high schools and convert Vets into one middle school by the 2017 school year, officially known as "Alternative 5". The 7–12 plan for Pilgrim and Vets returned as well, but it was voted off prior the decision. The Long Term Facilities Planning Committee hired an independent consultant, Symmes Maini & McKee Associates, to study the entire district and develop plans, for $238,243. In October, the new feeder plan was established, where ten elementary schools are to attend the new Vets Middle School, and Pilgrim when the students reach ninth grade. Throughout the 2016 school year, Vets students and parents were given an inside look of what Pilgrim would resemble after the consolidation. Then-Vets principal Gerald Habershaw presented a PowerPoint for concerned parents, and was named principal once the two schools merged, replacing interim principal Pamela Bernardi.

On the first day of the "new" Pilgrim, traffic stopped in the middle of Warwick Avenue, and the street leading towards drop-off roads and back parking lots were congested and unorganized. Vets students found themselves unable to find their buses, and even police officers attempted to guide motorists, but with no success. Habershaw described the traffic jam as a "perfect storm". Some parents found alternate routes by dropping their children off at the nearby Holliman Elementary, which prompted administrators to consider opening a drop-off route there, but no developments occurred.

Today, the students of Pilgrim experienced what many consider a renaissance. The establishment of more clubs occurred as the teachers' union successfully negotiated a contract effective November 2017. A political involvement club, established by a 2019 graduate of the school and an English teacher, attracts diverse numbers of students on learning debates, gaining confidence, and meeting actual politicians to help keep the club running and discuss certain topics involving the government. However, the club saw no activity after 2018.

The baseball team continues to finish off most seasons with winning records, but not close to the potent 1970s teams. The football team, with the support of new coaching staff and a 4–3 record, reached the playoffs to compete in a rematch against Central Falls for the division title in 2018, but only to lose 14–10 at the conclusion of the game. Cheerleading, field hockey, unified basketball, boys' basketball, boys' ice hockey, boys' soccer, girls' ice hockey, girls' lacrosse, girls' soccer, girls' indoor and outdoor track teams were known for winning titles during the sports revival era.

==== Homecoming Dance Controversy ====
On November 6, 2021, a time when COVID-19 cases were rising in the state, a video surfaced on the internet showing principal Gerald Habershaw without a mask alongside students at Pilgrim's annual homecoming dance. Soon after, Pilgrim saw a rise in COVID-19 cases, reporting 59 new student cases and 6 new faculty cases soon after the homecoming dance. As a result, the school moved to distance learning, which ended on November 29.

On November 22, Habershaw was placed on paid leave until further investigation, with assistant principal Pam Bernardi becoming acting principal until further notice. However, on November 27, Habershaw unexpectedly died from a heart attack at the age of 57. Later that day, his brother revealed that Habershaw tested positive for COVID-19 a few days after the homecoming dance but was recovering. Habershaw had been fully vaccinated and was not hospitalized leading up to his death.

On November 28, a memorial service was held at the high school, with hundreds attending.

=== 2022 Election Demolition and Replacement Ballot Measure ===
During the 2022 Midterm Elections, the City of Warwick introduced a local ballot measure that would have the city put aside $350 Million in bonds to demolish Pilgrim and Toll Gate High School and replace them with newer, more modern high school buildings. The ballot measure passed by a margin of 58.8% to 41.2% New facilities will be built at both school locations, including new athletic fields, a 750-seat auditorium, plus practice rooms and art studios. The new Pilgrim High School building is scheduled to be ready for the start of the 2027-2028 school year.

=== Principal history ===
Principal	Tenure
Michael A. Morry	1962 – 1983
Ralph J. Hoffman	1983 – 1987
Edmund P. Miley	1987 – 2002
Victor A. Mercurio	2002 – 2004
Dennis Mullen	2004 – 2012
Marie Cote	2012 – 2015
Pam Bernardi	2015 – 2016
Gerald Habershaw	2016 – 2021
Pam Bernardi (acting)	2021 – 2022
Toby Gibbons	2022 –

== Demographics ==
Racial and special need demographic data as of the 2017–18 school year:

Race	Students	Percentage
White	1,173	82.66%
Hispanic (all races)	141	9.94%
Multiracial	43	3.03%
African-American	30	2.11%
Asian	22	1.55%
Native American	~10	0.71%

Special need	Students	Percentage
Economically disadvantaged	479	33.76%
With disabilities	212	14.94%

== Extracurriculars and other activities ==
=== Clubs ===
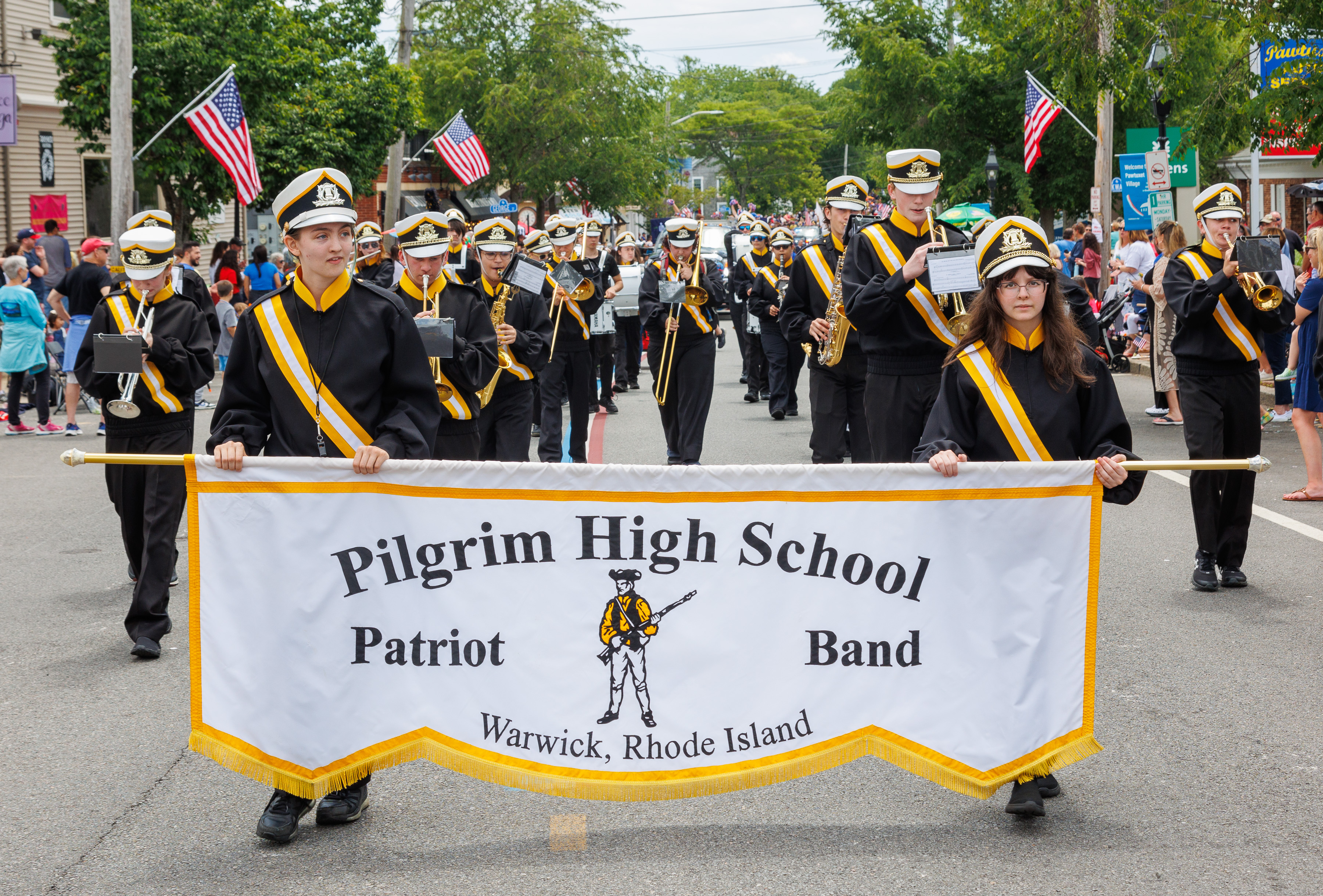
Pilgrim's Patriot Band marches in the Gaspee Days parade

Pilgrim offers various clubs that serve the hobbies of growing population of diverse students. Students, with the assistance of a teacher, can help form a club. In many cases, some organizations might form, only to die out in little time. Because of the infrequent updating of the official website, the following list might be inaccurate.

- Academic decathlon
- Art
- Chess
- Cheerleading (formerly known as the "Patri-Ettes")
- Chorale
- Class executive committees
- Concert band
- Drama (The Pilgrim Players)
- Dungeons & Dragons
- Environmental
- Guitar
- Lifesaver
- Lifesaver CTE
- Mock trial
- Model legislature (mock government)
- National Honor Society
- Newspaper
- Peer mentoring
- Photography
- Pilgrim Film Society
- Ping-pong
- Robotics
- Unified Pilgrim Project
- Studio 107 CTE
- Sailing
- Yearbook

In the past, Pilgrim once had an anime club, a bowling team, a diversity club, a gay-straight alliance, language clubs, a "life smarts" club, and Students Against Destructive Decisions, in the late 2000s. The arts, automotive, backgammon, career, dance, gaming, fine art, flag corps, history, judo, metalwork, microcomputer, project "close-up/in-site", and skiing clubs were active in the 1980s, and even a rifle club in the early 1970s.

=== Activities and events ===
Throughout the year, Pilgrim hosts events to attract students, alumni, and residents alike. Most of the proceeds go to funding various after-school events and clubs. Fundraisers are periodically held to raise money for the clubs and senior projects. Both the junior and senior proms are held, always one week apart from each other. The senior After-Prom Extravaganza (commonly referred to as APE) was first celebrated in 2008 after two graduates of Pilgrim died in an accident involving a drunk driver. Pilgrim Idol is the official musical talent show of the school, with contestants judged by staff members and local radio station DJs. Another talent show, locally known as the Follies, is a showcase of comedic, musical, and other performing arts talent. Near the beginning of the final exam week, seniors decorate the sidewalks with chalk. The tradition originated at Vets, but was quickly adopted by Pilgrim in 2016.

== Sports ==
As a member of the Rhode Island Interscholastic League, the Pilgrim Patriots was known in the 1970s for earning multiple division and state championships. By the end of the 1990s thru the 2010s, however, the Patriots suffered a period of time winning only a small number of championships. Since then, the Patriots found themselves successful again by the late 2010s. Athletic participation requires good academic standing. Students are taught that they represent the school as a whole while playing in sports.

=== Sports offered ===
Pilgrim offers sixteen sports for their students to have an opportunity to play in:

- Baseball (boys only)
- Basketball
- Cheerleading
- Cross country
- Field hockey (girls only)
- Golf (co-ed)
- Gymnastics (girls only, in cooperation with Toll Gate)
- Football (boys only)
- Ice hockey
- Lacrosse
- Soccer
- Softball (girls only)
- Swimming
- Tennis
- Track and field (indoor and outdoor)
- Volleyball
- Wrestling (co-ed)

Unified basketball and volleyball are also offered, and its teams compete in the RIIL tournament. Rugby union is also offered, but it is not an official RIIL sport. Pilgrim is the first and so far the only public high school in the state to compete in rugby matches.

=== Sports championship history ===
Most of Pilgrim's championships were won in the 1970s and 2010s. Please note that this table may be incomplete. Perfect football season 12-0 2019

Sport	Division championships	State championships	Runner-up appearances
Baseball	1970, 1972, 1973, 1974, 1978, 1980, 1990	1970, 1972, 1973, 1974, 1978, 1980, 1990	1979, 1989, 1992, 2002
Boys' basketball	1990, 2015	none	1979, 1990, 1998
Girls' basketball	1996	none	2019
Unified basketball	2014	none	none
Cheerleading	2019	none	none
Boys' cross country ^{A}	1968, 1969, 1970, 1971, 1972, 1973, 1975, 1987	1969, 1970, 1971, 1972, 1973, 1975, 1987	none
Girls' cross country	1995, 1996, 1998	none	none
Field hockey	1979, 1981, 2017	1979, 1981	1985, 1995
Football	1975,2019	1975,2019	1992, 1995, 2018
Boys' ice hockey	1974, 1975, 1976, 1990, 2018, 2019	none	1982, 2017
Girls' ice hockey	2014, 2015	2014	none
Boys' lacrosse	none	none	2017
Girls' lacrosse	2016	none	2013, 2014
Boys' soccer	1998, 2000	2018	1996, 2002, 2007
Girls' soccer	1989, 2000, 2014	2000	2018
Softball	1988, 2003	1988, 2003	none
Swimming	2001	none	none
Girls' tennis	1986	none	none
Boys' indoor track	1974, 1981, 1983	1974, 1981	none
Girls' indoor track	1995, 1996, 1997, 2014, 2016	1996	none
Girls' outdoor track	2014, 2016	none	none
Boys' volleyball	2012	2012	none
Girls' volleyball	1974, 1975, 1978	1974, 1975, 1978	2014
Wrestling	1970, 1973, 1993	1970, 1973	2015
1960s–1970s totals	23	19	2
1980s totals	8	3	3
1990s totals	11	2	7
2000s totals	4	2	3
2010s totals	15	1	9
Total championships	61	27	24

== Notable alumni ==
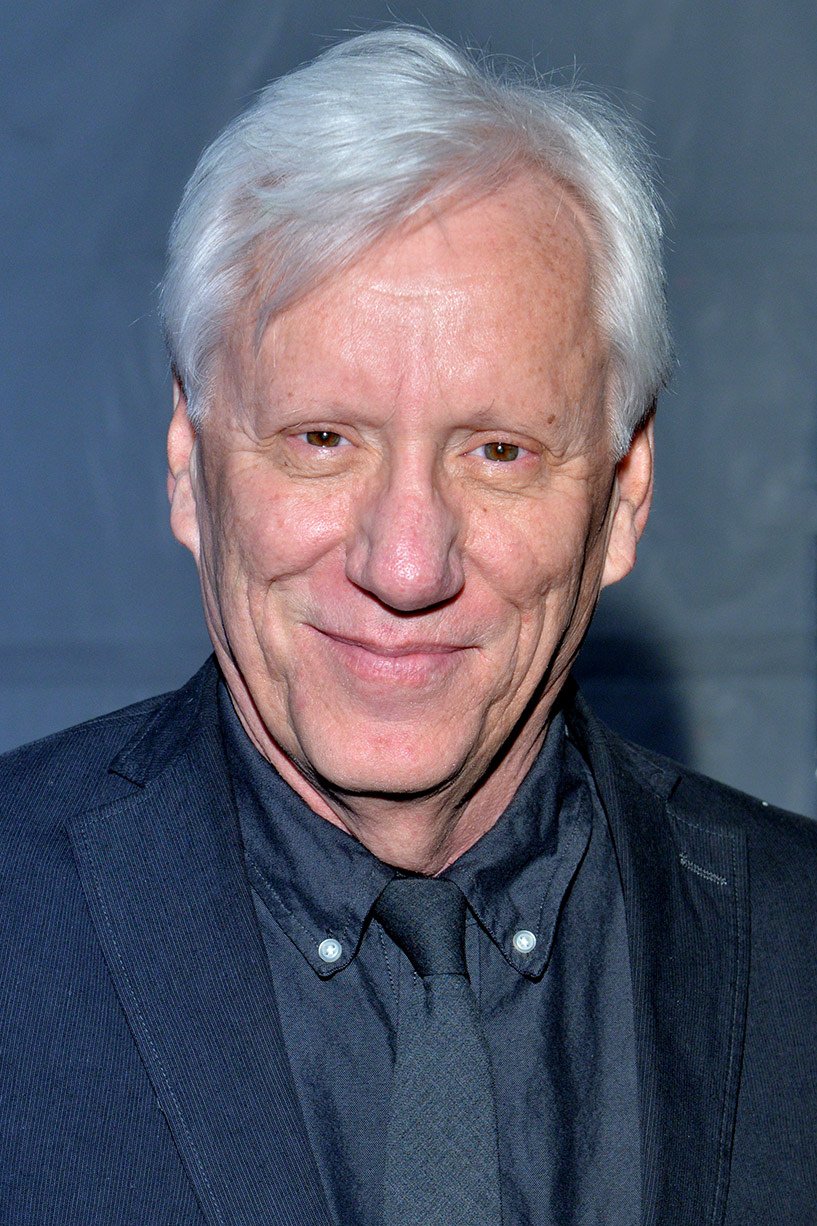
James Woods attended Pilgrim during its infamous double session era

For over fifty years, Pilgrim has taught over thousands of students, some of them gaining notability later in their lives, both locally and nationally. Noted alumni of the school include:

- Scott Avedisian, former mayor of Warwick (1983)
- Patrick Sheehan, PGA professional golfer (1987)
- Chris Terreri, college All-American, Olympian, and two-time Stanley Cup champion (1982)
- Dan Wheeler, professional baseball pitcher (1995)
- James Woods, actor, Primetime Emmy Award winner, and Mike Toreno of Grand Theft Auto: San Andreas (1965)
- Pete Gaynor, former Administrator of the Federal Emergency Management Agency and former Acting United States Secretary of Homeland Security

== Notes ==
A.The boys' track teams from 1971–1973, and 1975, were named New England regional champions.
