= Juventus FC and the Italy national football team =

Juventus is the club that has contributed the most players to the Italy national team in history. They are the only Italian club that has contributed players to every Italy national teams since its first appearance at the 1934 FIFA World Cup. Juventus have contributed numerous players to Italy's World Cup campaigns.

Two Juventus players have won the golden boot and the golden ball award at the World Cup with Italy; Paolo Rossi in 1982 and Salvatore Schillaci in 1990. As well as contributing to Italy's World Cup winning sides, Alfredo Foni and Pietro Rava represented Italy in the gold medal winning squad at the 1936 Summer Olympics, and Sandro Salvadore, Ernesto Castano and Giancarlo Bercellino made Italy's 1968 European Championship squad. In 2021, four Juventus players (captain Giorgio Chiellini, Federico Bernardeschi, Leonardo Bonucci and Federico Chiesa) won the UEFA Euro 2020.

== List of call-ups of Juventus players to the Italy national team ==
Below is a list of all Juventus players to have played for the senior national team (or Nazionale A in Italian) in official matches during their Juventus career, starting when Giuseppe Giaccone became the first Juventus player to appear for the national team on 28 March 1920.

- Christian Abbiati
- Luigi Allemandi
- Amauri*
- Ugo Amoretti
- Pietro Anastasi
- Roberto Anzolin
- Alberto Aquilani
- Dino Baggio
- Roberto Baggio
- Andrea Barzagli
- Romeo Benetti
- Giancarlo Bercellino I (EC)
- Federico Bernardeschi (EC)
- Luigi Bertolini (WC) (CEIC)
- Alberto Bertuccelli
- Roberto Bettega
- Carlo Bigatto I
- Alessandro Birindelli
- Manuele Blasi
- Giampiero Boniperti
- Leonardo Bonucci (EC)
- Felice Borel II (WC) (CEIC)
- Matteo Brighi
- Antonio Bruna
- Gianluigi Buffon (WC)
- Antonio Cabrini (WC)
- Umberto Caligaris (WC) (CEIC)
- Andrea Cambiaso
- Mauro Camoranesi* (WC)
- Fabio Cannavaro (WC)
- Fabio Capello
- Massimo Carrera
- Pierluigi Casiraghi
- Ernesto Castano (EC)
- Franco Causio
- Sergio Cervato
- Renato Cesarini* (CEIC)
- Luigi Cevenini III (CEIC)
- Giorgio Chiellini (EC)
- Federico Chiesa (EC)
- Umberto Colombo
- Gianpiero Combi (WC) (CEIC)
- Antonio Conte
- Giuseppe Corradi
- Antonello Cuccureddu
- Giuseppe Damiani
- Luigi De Agostini
- Virginio De Paoli
- Mattia De Sciglio
- Alessandro Del Piero (WC)
- Teobaldo Depetrini
- Angelo Di Livio
- Marco Di Vaio
- Flavio Emoli
- Nicolò Fagioli
- Ciro Ferrara
- Giovanni Ferrari (WC) (CEIC)
- Rino Ferrario
- Pio Ferraris
- Alfredo Foni (O) (WC)
- Andrea Fortunato
- Giuseppe Furino
- Roberto Galìa
- Bruno Garzena
- Federico Gatti
- Claudio Gentile (WC)
- Emanuele Giaccherini
- Giuseppe Giaccone
- Sebastian Giovinco
- Adolfo Gori
- Giuseppe Grabbi
- Fabio Grosso
- Vincenzo Iaquinta
- Filippo Inzaghi
- Mark Iuliano
- Moise Kean
- Nicola Legrottaglie
- Gianfranco Leoncini
- Manuel Locatelli
- Attilio Lombardo
- Sergio Manente
- Gian Pietro Marchetti
- Marco Marchionni
- Claudio Marchisio
- Giacomo Mari
- Giancarlo Marocchi
- Domenico Marocchino
- Rinaldo Martino
- Alessandro Matri
- Giampaolo Menichelli
- Fabrizio Miccoli
- Fabio Miretti
- Luis Monti* (WC) (CEIC)
- Antonio Montico
- Bruno Mora
- Francesco Morini
- Marco Motta
- Ermes Muccinelli
- Federico Munerati (CEIC)
- Bruno Nicolè
- Antonio Nocerino
- Angelo Ogbonna
- Raimundo Orsi* (WC) (CEIC)
- Dani Osvaldo*
- Michele Padovano
- Raffaele Palladino
- Carlo Parola
- Federico Peluso
- Simone Pepe
- Mattia Perin
- Angelo Peruzzi
- Gianluca Pessotto
- Alberto Piccinini
- Silvio Piola
- Andrea Pirlo
- Fabio Quagliarella
- Pietro Rava (O) (WC)
- Fabrizio Ravanelli
- Eduardo Ricagni *
- Virginio Rosetta (WC) (CEIC)
- Paolo Rossi (WC)
- Daniele Rugani
- Sandro Salvadore (EC)
- Benito Sarti
- Salvatore Schillaci
- Gaetano Scirea (WC)
- Lucidio Sentimenti IV
- Aldo Serena
- Omar Sívori *
- Leonardo Spinazzola
- Luciano Spinosi
- Pietro Serantoni
- Gino Stacchini
- Stefano Sturaro
- Alessio Tacchinardi
- Stefano Tacconi
- Marco Tardelli (WC)
- Moreno Torricelli
- Roberto Tricella
- Giovanni Varglien II
- Mario Varglien I (WC)
- Giuseppe Vavassori
- Giovanni Vecchina
- Gianluca Vialli
- Christian Vieri
- Giovanni Viola
- Pasquale Vivolo
- Gianluca Zambrotta (WC)
- Simone Zaza
- Gianfranco Zigoni
- Dino Zoff (WC)

Source: (in Italian)
Legend:

- (WC) = FIFA World Cup winners during their careers at Juventus
- (EC) = UEFA European Championship winners during their careers at Juventus
- (O) Olympic football tournament winners during their careers at Juventus
- (CEIC) = Central European International Cup winners during their careers at Juventus
- (*) Oriundi footballers.

As of 11 July 2021.

== Top 10 national team appearances for Juventus players ==
Not all appearances made for the national team by the players were made while they were under contract with Juventus. Updated on 15 June 2023.

Rank	Player	Appearances	Goals	First cap	Last cap
1	Gianluigi Buffon	176	0	1997	2018
2	Fabio Cannavaro	136	2	1997	2010
3	Leonardo Bonucci	121	8	2010	2023
4	Giorgio Chiellini	117	8	2004	2022
5	Andrea Pirlo	116	13	2002	2015
6	Dino Zoff	112	0	1968	1983
7	Gianluca Zambrotta	98	2	1999	2010
8	Alessandro Del Piero	91	27	1995	2008
9	Marco Tardelli	81	6	1976	1985
10	Gaetano Scirea	78	2	1975	1986

== See also ==
- Blocco-Juve
- Nazio-Juve

== Bibliography ==
- Giacone, Gianni (1993). Juve Azzurri - I bianconeri che hanno fatto grande la Nazionale (in Italian). Hurrà Juventus – Fabbri Editori.
- Tavella, Renato (2001). Dizionario della grande Juventus. Dalle origini ai nostri giorni (in Italian). Newton Compton. ISBN 88-8289-639-0.
