= Warwick Public Schools =

Warwick Public Schools may refer to:

- Warwick Public Schools (North Dakota)
- Warwick Public Schools (Rhode Island)

== See also ==
- Warwick School District
