= Sports dynasty =

Team or individual that dominates their sport for an extended length of time

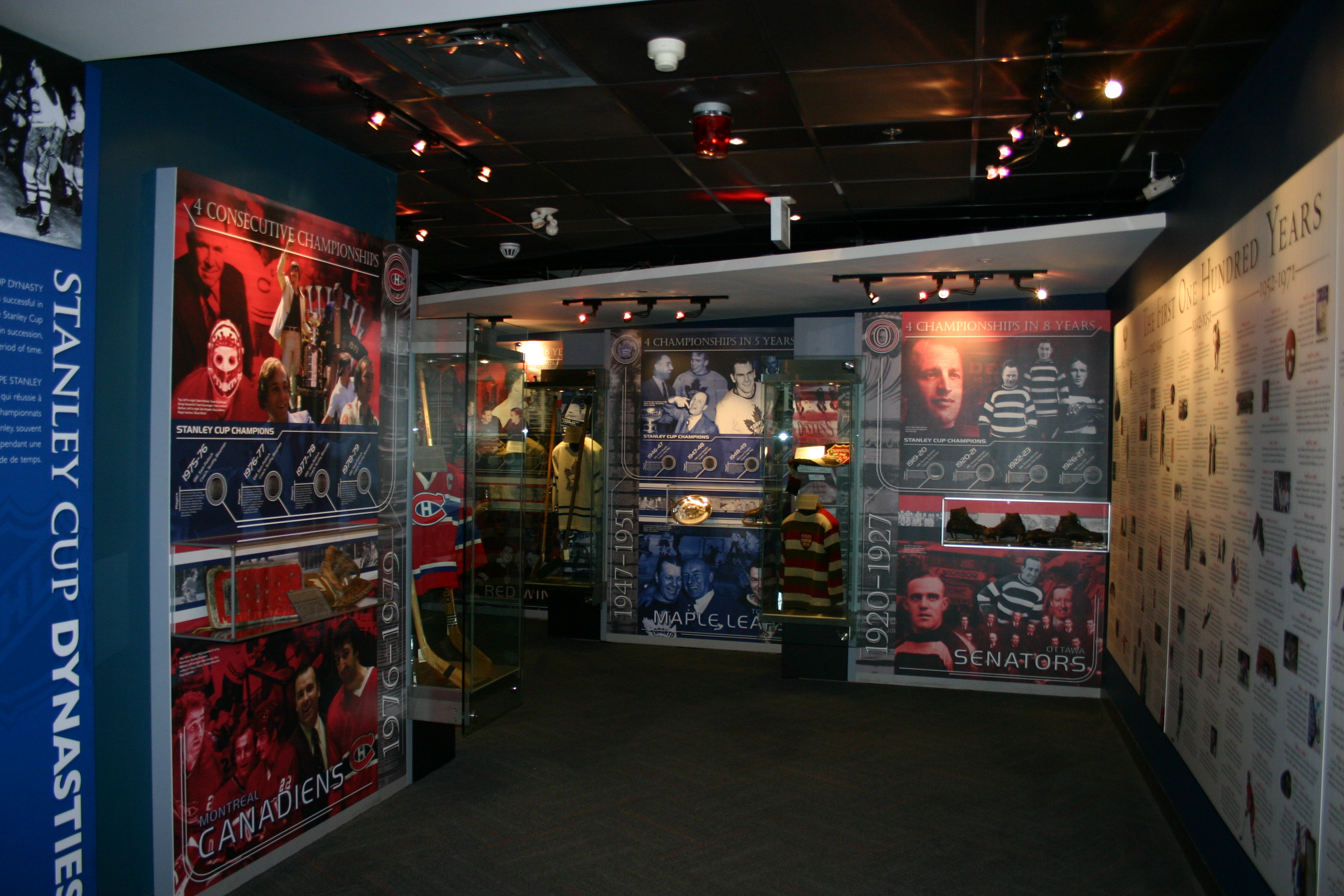
Exhibits on various Stanley Cup dynasties at the Hockey Hall of Fame

In sports, a dynasty is a team or individual that dominates their sport or league for an extended length of time. Some leagues usually maintain official lists of dynasties, often as part of a hall of fame, but in many cases, whether a team or individual has achieved a dynasty is subjective. This can result in frequent topic of debate among sports fans due to lack of consensus and agreement in the many different variables and criteria that fans may use to define a sports dynasty. Merriam-Webster describes a dynasty as a "sports franchise which has a prolonged run of successful seasons". Within the same sport, or even the same league, dynasties may be concurrent with each other. This is a list of teams that have been called a dynasty after periods of success. The use of the term to characterize such prolonged success emerged in the early 20th century.

== Association football ==
=== Club ===
==== American Major League Soccer ====
- D.C. United, 1996 to 1999 (three MLS championships in four years and two Supporters' Shields). In addition to the MLS Championships D.C. United won other American and regional titles during this time. In 1996, D.C. United won the Lamar Hunt US Open Cup and in 1998 D.C. United won the CONCACAF Champions Cup as the best team in North America and later in the same year won the InterAmerican Cup against the champions of South America.
- LA Galaxy, 2009 to 2015 (three MLS championships in four years and two Supporters' Shields). Additionally, the team has four Western Conference titles and has had great players such as David Beckham, Landon Donovan and Robbie Keane.

==== Argentine Primera División ====
- Boca Juniors, 1999 to 2012. In their "Golden Era", the Xeneizes, led by Riquelme, Palermo, Tevez, among others, won seven domestic championships (five Torneo Apertura and two Torneo Clausura), four Copa Libertadores (2000, 2001, 2003 and 2007), two Copa Sudamericana (2004 and 2005), three Recopa Sudamericana (2005, 2006 and 2008), and two Intercontinental Cup (2000 and 2003).

==== Belarus Highest League ====
- BATE Borisov won 13 consecutive national championships from 2006 to 2018 and became first and only Belarusian club that participated in the UEFA Champions League group stage (2008/09, 2011/12, 2012/13, 2014/15, 2015/16).

==== Canadian Premier League ====
- Forge FC, 2019 to 2024. Led by head coach and sporting director Bobby Smyrniotis, Forge FC went to six league finals in six years, winning four Canadian Premier League championships.

==== English First Division and Premier League ====
- Arsenal between 1930 and 1938. In this time, the club won five English league titles, including three in a row, plus the FA Cup in 1930 and 1936. On top of this, they won the FA Charity Shield on five occasions.
- Liverpool between 1972 and 1990. During those eighteen years, the club became English champions on eleven occasions, under the successive guidance of Bill Shankly, Bob Paisley, Joe Fagan and Kenny Dalglish. Other domestic honours won during the period were the FA Cups in 1974, 1986 and 1989 and the League Cups, won on four consecutive occasions from 1981 to 1984. This dominance was extended to the European stage, beginning in 1972–73 when the club won the second-tier UEFA Cup. Further success in this competition arrived in 1975–76, before Liverpool embarked on a run of four top-tier European Cup wins between 1976–77 and 1983–84. No other English club has achieved such success in the premier European club competition since then. Liverpool reached their finest hour in the 1983–84 season when, with Joe Fagan at the helm, they became English champions while also winning the League Cup and the European Cup final against Roma.
- Manchester United created one of the biggest dynasties that lasted from the start of the Premier League in 1992–93 to 2012–13. After six seasons of Sir Alex Ferguson rebuilding the club, the team won the first-ever Premier League title, which was also their eighth top-tier league title. This victory was only the beginning of dominance, as the club won the league title twelve more times, setting a new English record of 20 top-tier titles. Manchester United also lifted the FA Cup during this period with victories in 1993–94, 1995–96, 1998–99 and 2003–04. Furthermore, United became the Champions of Europe twice during that time span, as well as reaching a further two finals. They won the Champions League in 1998–99 (completing the treble of league title, FA Cup and European Cup) and 2007–08. During this time, the club finished no lower than third in each Premier League season.
- Manchester City succeeded their rivals as the pre-eminent team in the Premier League, having won eight titles since 2011–12 Premier League. Additionally, they have won two FA Cups and six league cups in that time span. City's dominion of the league strengthened since Pep Guardiola took charge of the team in 2016; they won six of the last seven titles as of 2024, including a four-in-a-row sequence. Guardiola also guided them to the treble, winning the league, FA Cup and their maiden Champions League, also becoming just the second English team to accomplish the feat.

==== French Ligue 1 ====
- Paris Saint-Germain from 2012 to present in Ligue 1. PSG won twelve Ligue 1 championships in fourteen seasons (2013, 2014, 2015, 2016, 2018, 2019, 2020, 2022, 2023, 2024, 2025). They also won eight Coupe de France titles, including four straight from 2015 to 2018, as well as 5 straight Coupe de la Ligue titles from 2014 to 2018, with another in 2020. In Europe, PSG won back-to-back Champions Leagues in 2025 and 2026, only one of two sides in the Champions League era to do so. So far, PSG have achieved domestic treble four times and continental treble once, when they took their first European crown in 2025.

==== German Bundesliga ====
- Bayern Munich from 1968 to present. Since the foundation of Bundesliga in 1963, Bayern have won the league a record 33 times, more than every other German clubs combined. Bayern also won the European Cup three times in a row from 1974 to 1976, and won the Champions League subsequently in 2001, 2013, and 2020. Bayern became the first German club to win the quadruple in the 2012–13 season, winning the Bundesliga, DFB-Pokal, Champions League and DFL-Supercup. They won eleven consecutive league titles, from 2013 to 2023, until their winning streak was broken by Bayer Leverkusen in the 2023–24 season.

==== Greek Super League ====
- Olympiacos are the most successful club in Greek football history, with 47 Greek League titles and 28 Greek Cups.

==== Italian Football Championship and Serie A league ====
- Genoa from 1898 to 1904 in Italian football having won six Italian championship titles in seven years (in a double three peat sequence) using the Cambridge's Pyramid.
- Pro Vercelli from 1908 to 1913 in Italian football having won five Italian championship titles in six years. Also, the Vercelli's club players during that period constituted the backbone of the nascent national team.
- Juventus from 1930–31 to 1934–35 seasons in Italian football. During Edoardo Agnelli presidency and with the technical guidance of Carlo Carcano, who implemented in the team the Metodo tactic scheme; the club dominated the 1930s winning five consecutive national championships – at the time the sole top flight competition in the country – a national record that stood for the next 82 years and allowed the Turinese side to form the core of the Italy national team during the Vittorio Pozzo's era, including the 1933–1935 Central European International Cup winner team and the 1934 world champion squad.

From the 1971–72 to the 1985–86, during Giampiero Boniperti presidency and under the successive management of former footballers Čestmír Vycpálek, Carlo Parola and Giovanni Trapattoni, became Italian champions nine times and won the Italian Cup twice, establishing the most enduring dynasty in Italian association football history. During the second half of the 1970s, Trapattoni successfully implemented in the team the Zona mista tactic scheme. Such triumphs allowed i Bianconeri to form the backbone of the Italy national team during Enzo Bearzot's era, including the 1978 FIFA World Cup semifinalist and 1982 world champion squads, achieving with the latter its first title in the competition in 44 years. The club's dominance was extended to the international spotlight starting in 1977 when the club won the UEFA Cup without foreign footballers, an unprecedented achievement for any country's team. Subsequently, the club lifted the Cup Winners' Cup and the European Champions Cup becoming the first club in the history of European football to have won all three seasonal confederation competitions. Finally, after their triumph in the 1984 UEFA Super Cup and the 1985 Intercontinental Cup, the first title for a European side since the restructuring of the tournament occurred five years beforehand; the club also became the first in football history – and world's only one until 2022 – to have won all possible official continental tournaments and the world title, leading the UEFA rankings for the first time in the decade's ending.
A further triumphs era for the club was established in the late 1990s and early 2000s when Juventus, under the coaching of Marcello Lippi, won five Serie A titles in nine years from 1995 to 2003. In that period, the Torinese club also won one Italian Cup, four Supercoppa Italiana, one Intercontinental Cup, one Champions League, one UEFA Super Cup and one UEFA Intertoto Cup, leading also the confederation classify in the ending 1990s.
A renewed successful period begins from 2011–12 to 2019–20 seasons, during Andrea Agnelli presidency and with the successive coaching of former player Antonio Conte, Massimiliano Allegri and Maurizio Sarri; where the club won nine straight Serie A titles and four Italian Cups in a row (2015–2018), establishing new all-time record of successive triumphs in both competitions. Also, in the league championship, the club was the first in 20 years and the first in a championship with 20 teams contestants to have won a title unbeaten (2011–12) and has established the historic record of points made in the competition (102 in 2013–14) as well as the records of most wins in a single season (33 in 2013–14) and most consecutive wins during a single season (25 in 2015–16). During this time, Juventus reached a record of four national doubles in a row since 2015 to 2018 and one Italian treble (2016),^{c} won also four national super cups and also appeared in two Champions League finals.

- Torino during the 1940s in Italian football due to their success in the league championships in 1942–43 and from 1945–46^{d} to 1948–49. This team notably won a historic five consecutive league titles and were given the moniker Grande Torino by the press.
- A.C. Milan experienced several successful periods during their history. In the 1950s, having won four league titles and two Latin Cups, which was considered a predecessor of club tournaments in Europe, namely the European Cup. From the 1987–88 to the 1995–96 season, Milan won five Serie A titles. Also, they were able to secure four Supercoppa Italiana in 1988, 1992, 1993 and 1994. Internationally, Milan honours included three UEFA Champions Leagues in 1988–89, 1989–90 and 1993–94 seasons, three UEFA Super Cup titles (1989, 1990 and 1994) and two Intercontinental Cups (1989 and 1990). In this period, the game philosophy of then manager Arrigo Sacchi is considered to have revolutionized football in Italy, where the game was previously based on a defensive approach (in some extreme cases referred to as Catenaccio), switching the focus towards a highly fluid and organized game, zonal marking and intense pressing in the midfield line. He did so while at the same time securing one of the strongest defending packages of all time, thanks to individuals such as Franco Baresi and Paolo Maldini. In the 2000s, namely between the 2002–03 and 2006–07 seasons, Milan achieved important successes, having won one Serie A title, one Coppa Italia, one Supercoppa Italiana, two UEFA Champions Leagues, two UEFA Super Cups and one FIFA Club World Cup.
- Inter Milan experienced two golden eras. During the Grande Inter era of the mid-1960s, Inter, managed by Helenio Herrera, won three Serie A titles, 1962–63, 1964–65 and 1965–66, as well as back-to-back European Cups (1963–64 and 1964–65) and Intercontinental Cups (1964 & 1965).

A second golden era was from 2004–05 to 2010–11, getting a record of five consecutive national championships titles won, four Coppa Italia (2004–05, 2005–06, 2009–10, 2010–11), four Supercoppa Italiana (2005, 2006, 2008 and 2010) and one UEFA Champions League (2009–2010) and one FIFA Club World Cup (2010). Inter was managed by Roberto Mancini (2004–08), José Mourinho (2008–10), Rafael Benítez (2010) and Leonardo Araújo (2010–2011) with a squad led by Javier Zanetti, Diego Milito, Samuel Eto'o, Maicon, and Zlatan Ibrahimović.

==== Spanish La Liga ====
- Real Madrid won 12 La Liga titles in 16 seasons (from 1953–54 to 1968–69, including a five-in-a-row sequence in 1961–65), as well as reaching eight European Cup finals in 11 seasons (from 1955–56 to 1965–66; won six, including five in a row in 1956–60). They also won five consecutive league titles in 1986–90. The club's most recent dynasty formed as part of their gálactico transfer policy, with the team reaching eight consecutive Champions League semi-finals from 2010–11 to 2017–18 and winning six titles between 2014 and 2024, including a three-in-a-row sequence.
- Barcelona from the 2004–05 season to 2019–20. They won ten La Liga championships and four Champions League titles, including an unprecedented six major trophies in 2009, and became the first Spanish team to win the Sextuple. They also became the first team to win the treble twice in European football in the 2014–15 season.

=== Collegiate ===
- Saint Louis Billikens men's soccer, 1959–1974. Led by head coaches Bob Guelker and Harry Keough, SLU won 10 titles in the first 15 seasons of the NCAA Division I men's soccer tournament, as well as making the championship game six consecutive times from 1969 to 1974 and the College Cup all years except for 1964 and 1966.
- North Carolina Tar Heels women's soccer, 1979–2012 (22 national championships in 34 years, 21 of those are NCAA Tournament Championships). This also includes 9 consecutive NCAA Tournament Championships from 1986 to 1994, and 15 consecutive ACC Tournament Championships from 1989 to 2003. Also, they boast a 90% win rate, having won 704 games and lost or tied only 78 games, with a 101-game winning streak, 19 undefeated seasons, and 5 perfect seasons.

== Australian rules football ==
=== VFL/AFL ===
- Carlton 1904–1910, winning a three-peat in 1906–1908, reaching the grand final 3 more times.
- Collingwood 1925–1930, winning four-peat in 1927–1930, reaching the grand final 2 more times.
- Melbourne 1939–1941, winning a three-peat.
- Essendon 1941–1951, winning in 1942, 1946, 1949 and 1950, reaching the grand final 5 more times.
- Melbourne 1954–1964, winning three-peat in 1955–1957, then 1959, 1960 and 1964, reaching the grand final 2 more times.
- Carlton 1965–1973, winning in 1965, 1968, 1970 and 1972, reaching the grand final 2 more times.
- Richmond 1967–1974, winning in 1967, 1969, 1973 and 1974, reaching the grand final once more.
- Carlton 1979–1982, winning in 1979, 1981 and 1982.
- Hawthorn 1983–1991, winning in 1983, 1986, 1988, 1989 and 1991, reaching the grand final 3 more times.
- Brisbane Lions 1. 2001–2004, winning a three-peat in 2001–2003, reaching the grand final once more. 2. 2023 – 2026 winning another three-peat in 2024 – 2026.
- Geelong 2007–2011, winning in 2007, 2009 and 2011, reaching the grand final once more.
- Hawthorn 2008–2015, winning in 2008 and three-peat in 2013–2015, reaching the grand final once more.
- Richmond 2017–2020, winning in 2017, 2019 and 2020.

=== SANFL ===
- Norwood 1878–1885, winning six-peat, finishing second 2 more times.
- South Adelaide 1892–1900, winning in 1892, 1893, 1895, 1896, 1898 and 1899, finishing second 3 more times.
- West Adelaide 1908–1912, winning in 1908, 1909, 1911 and 1912.
- Port Adelaide 1909–1915, winning in 1910, 1913 and 1914, reaching the grand final 4 more times.
- Norwood 1922–1925, winning in 1922, 1923 and 1925.
- Port Adelaide 1936–1939, winning in 1936, 1937 and 1939, reaching the grand final once more.
- Norwood 1946–1950, winning in 1946, 1948 and 1950, reaching the grand final once more.
- Port Adelaide 1951–1965, winning in 1951, six-peat in 1954–1959, 1962 and 1965, reaching the grand final 2 more times.
- Sturt 1965–1970, winning five-peat in 1966–1970, reaching the grand final once more.
- Port Adelaide 1977–1981, winning in 1977, 1979, 1980 and 1981.
- Port Adelaide 1988–1999, winning three-peat in 1988–1990, 1992 three-peat in 1994–1996, 1998 and 1999, reaching the grand final once more.
- Central District 2000–2011, winning in 2000, 2001, three-peat in 2003–2005, four-peat in 2007–2010, reaching the grand final 3 more times.
- Norwood 2010–2014, winning a three-peat in 2012–2014, reaching the grand final once more.

=== WAFL ===
- Unions/Fremantle (II) 1886–1892, winning four-peat in 1887–1890, five-peat in 1892–1896 and 1898.
- East Fremantle 1899–1914, winning in 1900, three-peat in 1902–1904, 1906, three-peat in 1908–1910 and 1914, finishing second 5 more times.
- Subiaco 1912–1915, winning in 1912, 1913 and 1915.
- East Perth 1918–1923, winning five-peat in 1919–1923, reaching the grand final once more.
- East Fremantle 1928–1933, winning four-peat in 1928–1931 and 1933.
- West Perth 1932–1935, winning in 1932, 1934 and 1935.
- Claremont 1936–1940, winning a three-peat in 1938–1940, reaching the grand final 2 more times.
- East Fremantle 1943–1946, winning in 1943, 1945 and 1946, reaching the grand final once more.
- South Fremantle 1947–1956, winning in 1947, 1948, 1950, three-peat in 1952–1954, reaching the grand final 2 more times.
- East Perth 1956–1961, winning in 1956, 1958 and 1959, reaching the grand final 2 more times.
- Swan Districts 1961–1965, winning a three-peat in 1961–1963, reaching the grand final once more.
- Perth 1966–1968, winning a three-peat in 1966–1968, reaching the grand final once more.
- Swan Districts 1980–1984, winning a three-peat in 1982–1984, reaching the grand final once more.
- Claremont 1987–1996, winning in 1987, 1989, 1991, 1993 and 1996, reaching the grand final 3 more times.
- East Perth 2000–2002, winning three-peat.
- Subiaco 2003–2011, winning in 2004, three-peat in 2006–2008, reaching the grand final 3 more times.
- Subiaco 2014–2021, winning in 2014, 2015, 2018, 2019 and 2021, reaching the grand final 2 more times.

== Baseball ==
=== Major League Baseball ===
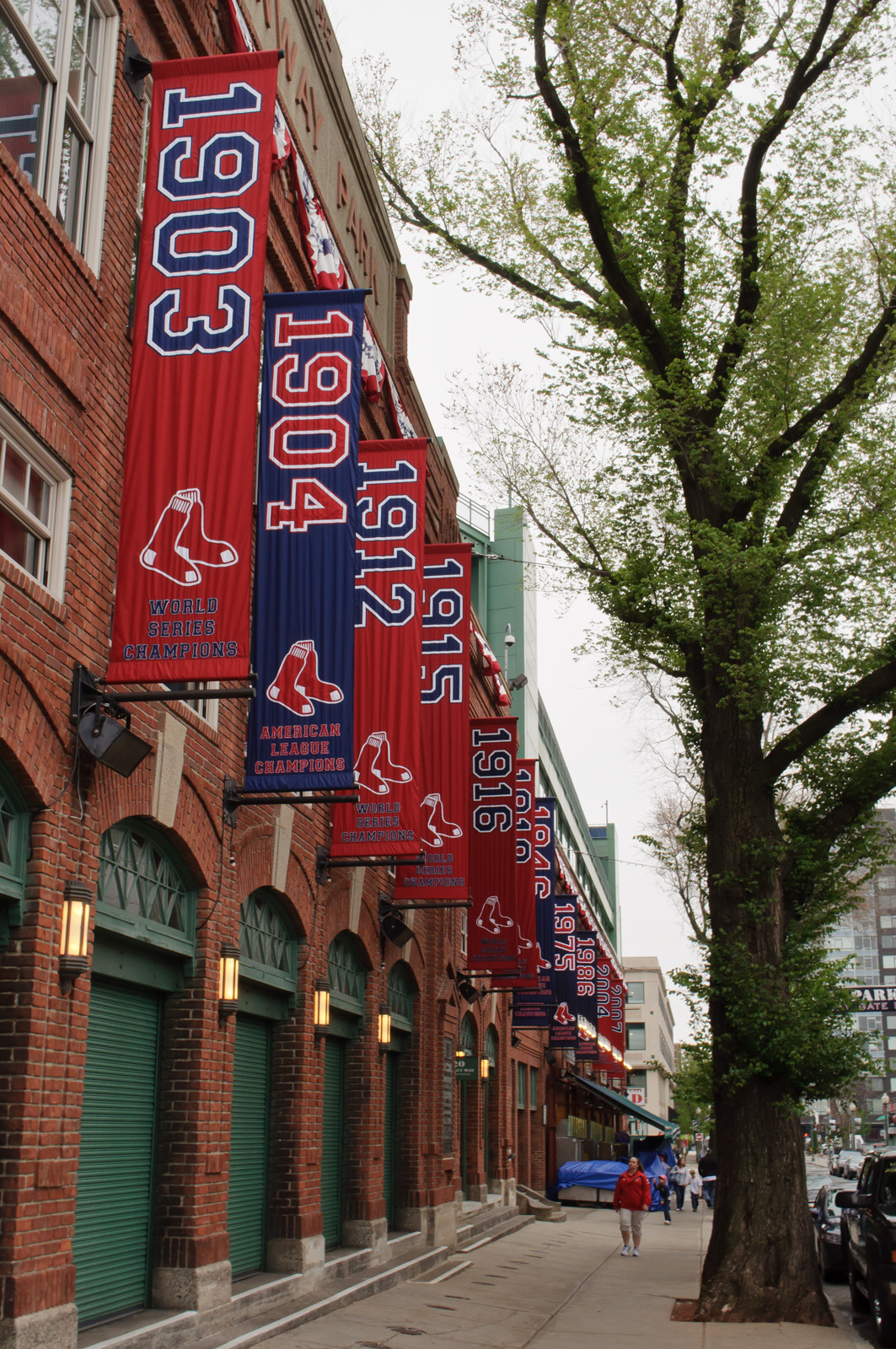
The Boston Red Sox's championship banners at Fenway Park, with banners from the team's dynastic years at the foreground

- Boston Red Sox: From 1903 to 1918. Enjoyed two stretches of greatness over sixteen seasons during the "dead-ball era".
  - In 1903 and 1904, the Red Sox won two straight pennants and the 1903 World Series. There was no 1904 World Series, as the National League's New York Giants refused to play the Red Sox. These teams were led by Cy Young and Jimmy Collins.
  - From 1912 to 1918, the Red Sox won four World Series titles in seven seasons. These teams were led by the Tris Speaker-Harry Hooper-Duffy Lewis outfield and pitchers Smoky Joe Wood and Babe Ruth.
- Philadelphia Athletics: From 1910 to 1914. The Athletics won 3 World Series titles in 4 years in 1910, 1911, and 1913. The Athletics also won a pennant in 1914. They were known for their "$100,000 Infield" (Stuffy McInnis, Eddie Collins, Jack Barry, and Home Run Baker) and their pitching staff, including Eddie Plank, Chief Bender, and Rube Waddell.
- New York Yankees: From 1921 to 1964. The Yankees played in 29 of the 44 World Series, winning 20 of them. During this 44-year period, the Yankees had three dominant stretches:
  - From 1921 to 1928 the Yankees won six AL pennants and three World Series (1923, 1927, 1928) in eight seasons, led by manager Miller Huggins, superstars Babe Ruth and Lou Gehring, center fielder Earle Combs, second baseman Tony Lazzeri, also bolstered by aces Herb Pennock and Waite Hoyt. Their 1927 team known as "Murderers Row" is widely considered as one of the greatest teams in MLB history.
  - From 1936 to 1943 the Yankees dominated baseball for eight years, capturing seven American League pennants and six World Series Championships, including four World Series in a row from 1936 to 1939.
  - From 1947 to 1964 the Yankees won 15 of 18 AL pennants and 10 World Series, including five in a row from 1949 to 1953. This is the MLB record for most consecutive championships.
- St. Louis Cardinals: From 1942 to 1946. The Cardinals won three World Series titles (1942, 1944, 1946) and four NL pennants in five years. They were led by Stan Musial, Red Schoendienst, and Enos Slaughter.
- Brooklyn/Los Angeles Dodgers: From 1947 to 1966. Over a twenty-year span, the Dodgers won four World Series titles (1955, 1959, 1963, 1965) and ten NL pennants. Manager Walter Alston and owner Walter O'Malley presided over all four championships.
  - In Brooklyn, general manager and co-owner Branch Rickey broke the baseball color line and tapped a deep well of underutilized Negro League talent, including superstars Jackie Robinson, Roy Campanella, and Don Newcombe. The team was captained by shortstop Pee Wee Reese, and also featured Gil Hodges, Duke Snider, and Johnny Podres. After losing four World Series to the Yankees, the Dodgers finally broke through by beating the Yankees in the 1955 World Series.
  - O'Malley bought out Rickey in 1950 and moved the Dodgers to Los Angeles in 1958 after a failed attempt of building a new domed stadium in Brooklyn. With the Brooklyn core aging, the team slumped to 7th place in 1958. However, the remaining core of Hodges, Snider, and Podres was bolstered by aces Sandy Koufax and Don Drysdale and shortstop Maury Wills. The team won three more World Series titles in seven years.
- Cincinnati Reds: From 1970 to 1976. Known as The Big Red Machine, they dominated the sport for 7 years (5 National League West Division titles, four National League pennants in 1970, 1972, 1975 and 1976, and two World Series titles in 1975 and 1976. The team's combined record from 1970 to 1976 was 683 wins and 443 losses, an average of nearly 98 wins per season).
- Oakland Athletics: From 1971 to 1975, known as the Swingin' A's and The Mustache Gang, won the World Series in 1972, 1973, and 1974.
- New York Yankees: From 1996 to 2004. The Yankees won four World Series in five years (1996, 1998, 1999, 2000), six AL pennants in eight years, and 9 out of 10 AL East titles from 1996 to 2006. These teams were led by manager Joe Torre and the Core Four (Derek Jeter, Jorge Posada, Mariano Rivera, and Andy Pettite), with contribution from notable players such as Paul O'Neill, Tino Martinez, Orlando Hernández, Roger Clemens, David Cone, Mike Mussina, and Bernie Williams. (Joe Girardi and the Core Four also led the team to the 2009 World Series title.)
- San Francisco Giants: From 2010 to 2014. The Giants won three World Series titles in five years (2010, 2012, 2014). They were led by manager Bruce Bochy; captain Buster Posey; pitchers Tim Lincecum, Madison Bumgarner, Matt Cain, and Sergio Romo; infielders Brandon Crawford, Brandon Belt, and Pablo Sandoval; and outfielder Hunter Pence. The last time a National League team won 3 titles in a 5-year span was in the 1940s with the St. Louis Cardinals.
- Los Angeles Dodgers: From 2017 to present. The Dodgers won three World Series titles in six years (2020, 2024, and 2025), two additional NL pennants in 2017 and 2018, and 13 NL West titles in 14 seasons (2013–2020, 2022–2026). Although two broad groups of players have contributed, manager Dave Roberts, executives Andrew Friedman and Stan Kasten, and owners Guggenheim Baseball Management have been present for all five World Series appearances.
  - The Dodgers' first World Series core (c. 2017–2021) began with aces Clayton Kershaw, closer Kenley Jansen, and batters Corey Seager, Cody Bellinger, Justin Turner, Max Muncy, Chris Taylor, and Joc Pederson. They lost the World Series in 2017 (controversially) and 2018. After 2019, the team traded for Mookie Betts, and prospects Walker Buehler, Julio Urías, and Will Smith became key contributors. They broke through by winning the 2020 World Series.
  - The Dodgers' second World Series core (2024–present) formed when the Dodgers rebuilt their starting rotation after early exits in the 2022 and 2023 postseasons despite winning over 100+ regular season games in both seasons. In 2024 and 2025, they added two-way star Shohei Ohtani and starting pitchers Yoshinobu Yamamoto, Blake Snell, and Tyler Glasnow. They also added Teoscar Hernández to their batting core of Betts, Muncy, Smith, and Freddie Freeman. The Dodgers won back-to-back World Series titles in 2024 and 2025.

=== Negro leagues ===
- Homestead Grays, 1937–1945. Eight Negro National League titles in nine seasons. Two Negro World Series titles in 1942 and 1943.

=== Nippon Professional Baseball ===
The following are dynasties from Nippon Professional Baseball.

- Yomiuri Giants, 1965—1973. Led by the greatest duo in Japanese baseball history, Sadaharu Oh and Shigeo Nagashima, the Giants went on to win nine consecutive Japan Series championships, the most in NPB history. Nicknamed the "V9 Dynasty".
- Seibu Lions, 1982—1994. Nicknamed "Invincible Seibu", the recently relocated Lions won 11 Pacific League pennants in 13 seasons, with 8 Japan Series championships in that span.
- Fukuoka SoftBank Hawks, 2011—present. Won eight Japan Series championships in a 15-year span, including four in a row from 2017 to 2020 and six out of seven from 2014 to 2020.

== Basketball ==
=== Professional ===
==== American Basketball Association ====
- Indiana Pacers from 1969 to 1975 led by star players such as Freddie Lewis, Roger Brown, Mel Daniels, and George McGinnis. The Pacers won 5 ABA Conference Championships in 1969, 1970, 1972, 1973, and 1975 and won the ABA Championship in 1970, 1972, and 1973. Other noteworthy accomplishments include 3 consecutive ABA division titles in 1969, 1970, and 1971, their playoff berths in every year of the ABA's existence, as well as their place as the winningest franchise in ABA history.

==== National Basketball Association ====
- Minneapolis Lakers from 1949 to 1954 led by George Mikan and head coach John Kundla. The Lakers officially won 5 NBA championships (in 1949, 1950, 1952, 1953, and 1954) in six years between the 1948–49 BAA season and 1953–54 NBA season. Minneapolis also achieved the NBA's first set of three consecutive championships winning the 1952 NBA Finals, the 1953 NBA Finals, and the 1954 NBA Finals. Minneapolis also won the 1948 NBL Championship, which is not recognized by the NBA. When including the 1948 NBL title, the championship count rises to a spectacular six championships in seven years and also gives the Lakers another three-peat as they won the 1948 NBL Title, the 1949 BAA Championship, and the 1950 NBA Championship.
- Boston Celtics from 1957 to 1976 led by superstar Bill Russell and John Havlicek and head coach Red Auerbach. In these 20 seasons, Boston won 13 NBA championships (1957, 1959, 1960, 1961, 1962, 1963, 1964, 1965, 1966, 1968, 1969, 1974, 1976). Boston won an unprecedented eight consecutive championships from 1959 to 1966. Boston also has the distinction of having played in 10 straight NBA Finals from 1957–1966.

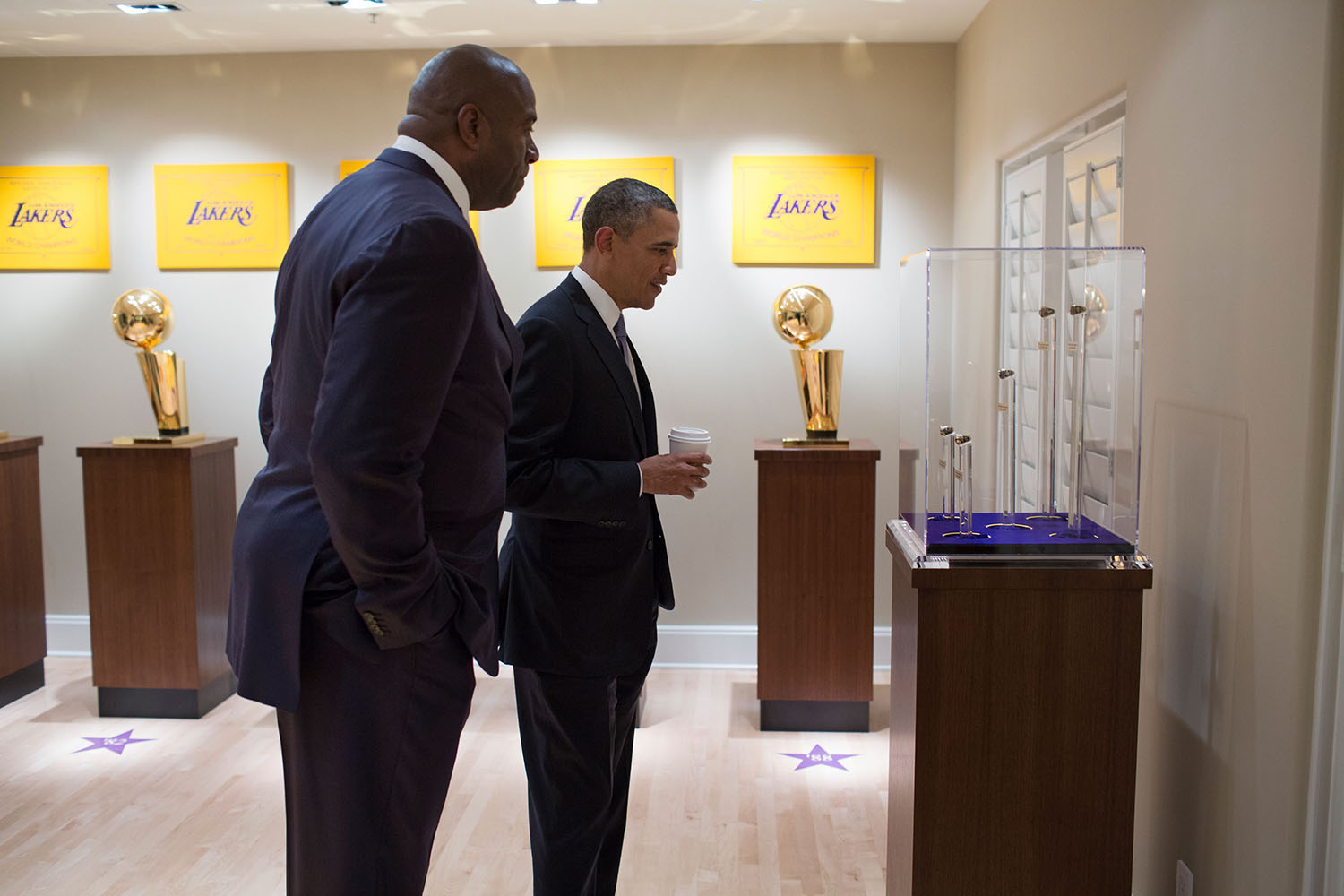
Magic Johnson's trophy room, featuring several Larry O'Brien Championship trophies in the background

- Los Angeles Lakers of 1979 to 1991 led by Magic Johnson, Kareem Abdul-Jabbar (1975–1989), James Worthy (1982–1994), Jamaal Wilkes (1977–1985), Michael Cooper (1978–1990), Bob McAdoo (1981–1985) and head coach Pat Riley. They were known as Showtime Lakers for the highly entertaining flashy brand of basketball they played. In these 12 seasons, Los Angeles won 5 NBA championships (1980, 1982, 1985, 1987, and 1988) in 9 years, 10 Division titles, and advanced to the NBA Finals 9 times between 1980 and 1991 including 4 straight appearances from 1982–1985. In the 1988 NBA Finals the Lakers became the first team since the Boston Celtics of the 1960s to win back-to-back NBA titles, having beaten the Celtics the previous year.
- Boston Celtics of 1979–1988 led by head coach K.C. Jones and players Larry Bird, Kevin McHale, and Robert Parish. Boston played in 5 finals, winning 3 championships (1981, 1984, and 1986) in a 9-year period. They were known for their roughness, toughness, and trash talking. The 1986 team is considered one of the greatest teams in NBA history with a record 40–1 home record.
- Chicago Bulls of 1990 to 1998 led by Michael Jordan, Scottie Pippen, Horace Grant (1987–1994), Dennis Rodman (1995–1998) and head coach Phil Jackson. In these 8 seasons, Chicago won 6 NBA championships, with 2 sets of three consecutive championships, winning championships in 1991, 1992, and 1993, then subsequently winning the 1996, 1997, and 1998 titles. Chicago also won 6 Eastern Conference titles and 6 division titles in 8 seasons. The Bulls set the best combined regular and postseason record in NBA history (87–13, .870) during the 1995–96 season.
- San Antonio Spurs of 1999 to 2017 led by Tim Duncan (1997–2016), David Robinson (1989–2003), Tony Parker (2001–2018), Bruce Bowen (2001–2009), Manu Ginóbili (2002–2018), Kawhi Leonard (2011–2018), and head coach Gregg Popovich. In these 19 seasons, San Antonio won 5 NBA championships (1999, 2003, 2005, 2007, and 2014), 6 Western Conference titles, and 13 division titles, plus 22 consecutive playoff appearances from 1998 to 2019. The Spurs were able to sustain a high level of consistency during Duncan's tenure with the team. The Spurs won 50+ games every season from 1997–98 through 2015–16 (except the lockout-shortened 1998–99 season), as well as a .707 win percentage during that span, the highest in any of the four major American sports).
- Los Angeles Lakers of 2000 to 2004 led by Kobe Bryant, Shaquille O'Neal, and head coach Phil Jackson. In these 5 seasons, Los Angeles won 4 Western Conference titles in 2000, 2001, 2002 and 2004, accomplishing a three-peat in the process by winning championships from 2000 to 2002. The 2001 team went 15–1 in the playoffs, setting the record for the highest win percentage in single playoffs (later broken).
- Golden State Warriors of 2015 to 2022 led by Stephen Curry, Klay Thompson, Draymond Green, Andre Iguodala, Kevin Durant (2016–2019) and head coach Steve Kerr. In these eight seasons, Golden State won four NBA championships (2015, 2017, 2018, and 2022) and six Western Conference titles (five consecutively from 2015 to 2019 and one more in 2022). Throughout this dynasty, the Warriors set many NBA records, most notably the best regular season record (73–9 in 2015–16) and the best postseason record (16–1 record in 2017) in NBA history, and had won at least 67 games in three consecutive regular seasons from 2014–15 to 2016–17.

==== Women's National Basketball Association ====
- Houston Comets from 1997 to 2000 (4 consecutive WNBA championships)
- Detroit Shock from 2003 to 2008 (3 WNBA championships in 6 years)
- Minnesota Lynx from 2011 to 2017 (4 WNBA championships in 7 years)
- Las Vegas Aces from 2022 to 2025 (3 WNBA Championships in 4 years)

=== Collegiate ===
==== NCAA Division I Men ====
- Kentucky Wildcats men's basketball from 1948 to 1958 under Adolph Rupp (4 national championships in 11 seasons; 1948, 1949, 1951, 1958. They also would make 6 Finals Fours between 1942 til 1966.
- UCLA Bruins men's basketball from 1964 to 1975 under John Wooden (10 national championships in 12 seasons; 1964, 1965, 1967, 1968, 1969, 1970, 1971, 1972, 1973, and 1975. They would also win 7 consecutive championships from 1967 to 1973, four undefeated seasons, and an NCAA record 88 consecutive wins).
- Connecticut Huskies men's basketball under Jim Calhoun, Kevin Ollie, and Dan Hurley (6 national championships from 1999 to 2024; 1999, 2004, 2011, 2014, 2023, and 2024. They would also make 7 Final Fours in this same time period.)

==== NCAA Division I Women ====
- University of Tennessee Lady Volunteers basketball under Pat Summitt from 1987 to 1998 (six national championships in 12 seasons), including three consecutive championships from 1996 to 1998 (the first women's team to do so), one undefeated season setting the most wins ever with 39, and an overall record of 314–38 (.877).
- University of Connecticut under Geno Auriemma since 1995 (12 championships in 30 seasons, including three consecutive championships from 2002 to 2004 and four consecutive from 2013 to 2016; five undefeated seasons in 2002, 2009, 2010, 2014 and 2016. The Huskies set a record with a 90-game winning streak from November 2008 to December 2010, and would later break that record with a 111-game winning streak from November 2014 to March 2017. Additionally, the Huskies have made 23 Final Four appearances in this span, including 14 consecutive appearances from 2008 to 2022.

==== Canadian university basketball ====
- Laurentian University Voyageurs women's basketball under head coach Norm Vickery won five consecutive CIAU national championships from 1975 through 1979.
- University of Victoria Vikes men's basketball under head coach Ken Shields won seven consecutive CIAU national championships from 1980 through 1986.
- University of Windsor Lancers women's basketball under head coach Chantal Vallée won five consecutive CIS national championships from 2011 through 2015.
- Carleton University Ravens men's basketball won five consecutive CIS/USports national championships from 2003 to 2007, seven consecutive national championships from 2011 to 2017, and 18 titles in 23 seasons between 2003 and 2026, 13 of the championship wins under head coach Dave Smart, 4 of the championship wins under head coach Taffe Charles.

== Cross-country and track ==
- United States Men's Olympic 4 × 100 meter team, 1916–1992
- Kenyan distance runners, 1968–1999

== Cricket ==
=== International ===
==== Test Cricket ====
- Australian national cricket team from 1945 through 1953.
- England cricket team in the 1950s.
- The West Indian cricket team dominated Test cricket through the 1980s and early 1990s. The West Indian team was not beaten in a test series between March 1980 and May 1995, a fifteen-year span including twenty series wins and nine drawn series.

==== One Day International Cricket ====
- The West Indies cricket team ruled the inaugural era of the One Day International (ODI) World Cup, winning the first two tournaments in 1975 and 1979. Under the fierce, dominant leadership of Clive Lloyd, they were an unstoppable force whose combination of intimidating fast bowlers and aggressive batting changed the sport.
- Australian national cricket team from 1987 through 2023. They are the only team to win the World Cup three consecutive times (1999, 2003, 2007) and they remained undefeated since their last defeat in group stages in 1999 World Cup against Pakistan. Their first loss in World Cup came in the 2011 World Cup group stage against Pakistan. Australia have won 5 out of the last 7 Men's World Cups (1999–2023) and their greatest victory was arguably versus India, in India, in 2023. This was their 6th World Cup title.

==== Twenty 20 International Cricket ====
- India national cricket team is the first team to win three T20 World Cups and clinch consecutive titles (2024, 2026). India's T20 supremacy is a throwback to the time when the West Indies of the mid-1970s to 80s and the Australians in the first decade of this millennium called the shots, winning a bagful of global titles and series across the world.

=== T20 Leagues ===
==== Indian Premier League ====
- Chennai Super Kings (2010–2023). Established in 2008 and famously known for the "Thala" era led by MS Dhoni and powered by an iconic core of legends that includes Suresh Raina, Ravindra Jadeja, and Dwayne Bravo. They are tied for the most tournament victories in Indian Premier League history with five championships (2010, 2011, 2018, 2021, 2023). They have qualified for the playoffs in 12 of their IPL seasons, a league record. They have reached the IPL final a staggering 10 times. Under head coach Stephen Fleming, the franchise became synonymous with calmness, analytical team selection, and unwavering loyalty to their core group of players.
- Mumbai Indians (2013–2020). Under the captaincy of Rohit Sharma, driven by a core group of players that included Lasith Malinga, Kieron Pollard, Hardik Pandya, and Jasprit Bumrah, MI completely ruled the league in the 2010s, winning all five of their titles (2013, 2015, 2017, 2019, 2020) within an 8-year span, becoming the first franchise in IPL history to win five championships. MI is renowned for identifying and grooming raw domestic talents, developing players like Jasprit Bumrah and Hardik Pandya.

==== Big Bash League ====
- Perth Scorchers (2013–2026) are the undisputed dynasty of the Big Bash League, sitting alone atop the competition with a record-breaking six championships (BBL|03, BBL|04, BBL|06, BBL|11, BBL|12, BBL|15). Out of the 15 completed seasons, the Scorchers have reached an astonishing nine grand finals. What separates Perth from the rest of the league is their highly disciplined team management under head coaches Justin Langer and Adam Voges. Unlike some franchises that rely heavily on marquee overseas players to carry the team, Perth builds around a strong foundation of local Western Australian talent, including Ashton Turner, Mitch Marsh, Jhye Richardson, and Josh Inglis.

==== Caribbean Premier League ====
- Trinbago Knight Riders established one of the greatest dynasties in franchise cricket, dominating the Caribbean Premier League during an era spanning 2015 to 2025. The franchise was acquired in 2016 by the Knight Riders Group making it the first CPL team with IPL ownership roots. This highly decorated era yielded a record shattering five CPL championships (2015, 2017, 2018, 2020, and 2025), driven by tactical stability under three iconic captains: Dwayne Bravo, Kieron Pollard, Nicholas Pooran. The dynasty was propelled by a legendary core of key players, including global T20 icons Sunil Narine and Andre Russell, alongside CPL mainstays like Darren Bravo.

==== SA20 ====
- Sunrisers Eastern Cape (2023–2026) has established the premier dynasty in the SA20, capturing an astonishing three championships in just four seasons (2023, 2024, 2026). Built on stability, tactical brilliance, and a knack for nurturing local talent, the "Orange Army" is backed by the Indian SUN Group and guided by Coach Adrian Birrell. By prioritizing continuity over wholesale changes and seamlessly transitioning leadership from Aiden Markram to Tristan Stubbs, the Gqeberha based franchise continues to set the benchmark in South African T20 cricket.

=== 100-ball Cricket ===
==== The Hundred ====
- Oval Invincibles men's team won three consecutive titles (2023, 2024, and 2025). Following the England and Wales Cricket Board's sale of equity stakes in The Hundred, India's Reliance Industries (owners of the Mumbai Indians) acquired a 49% stake in the franchise. Consequently, the Invincibles were officially rebranded as MI London starting with the 2026 Season.

== Curling ==
=== International ===
- Niklas Edin 2018–present. With lead Christoffer Sundgren, second Rasmus Wranå, and third Oskar Eriksson. Won five World Championships out of six championships in seven years.

=== National ===
- Brad Gushue 2017–present. With lead Geoff Walker; seconds Brett Gallant, EJ Harnden, and Brendan Bottcher; and third Mark Nichols. Won six Briers in eight years.
- Kerri Einarson 2020–2023. With lead Briane Harris, second Shannon Birchard, and third Val Sweeting. Won four consecutive Scotties Tournament of Hearts.

== Esports ==
=== Counter-Strike: Global Offensive ===
- Astralis, 2017–2019. The Danish esports organization won 4 major championships, with 3 being back-to-back-to-back titles in the span of 3 years, winning ELEAGUE Major 2017, FACEIT Major: London 2018, IEM Katowice Major 2019 and StarLadder Major: Berlin 2019.

=== League of Legends ===
- T1, 2023–2025. The South Korean esports organization won the League of Legends World Championship in 2023, 2024, and 2025, which is the first time any team has won back-to-back-to-back titles in World Championship history.

== Handball ==
=== Club ===
- The HC Spartak Kyiv, Kiev women's handball team, won thirteen out of 18 Champions' league titles from 1970 to 1988 (72% of titles) including two lines of four titles in a row.
- FC Barcelona Handbol, the men's Barcelona professional handball team, won an all-time best five consecutive Champions' League from 1995 to 2000.
- Croatia's most successful men's handball club PPD RK Zagreb has an unprecedented title streak. They won all 31 Croatian championships out of 31.

== Gridiron football ==
=== American football ===
==== National Football League ====
- Green Bay Packers (1929–1944), led by head coach Curly Lambeau. The Packers won six NFL championships in 16 years (1929, 1930, 1931, 1936, 1939, 1944) along with two runner-up finishes (1932, 1938).
- Chicago Bears (1940–1946), led by head coach George Halas. The Bears, which were dubbed The Monsters of the Midway, won four NFL championship games throughout the decade (1940, 1941, 1943, 1946).
- Cleveland Browns (1950–1955), led by head coach Paul Brown and quarterback Otto Graham, the Browns played in six consecutive NFL championship games, winning three in 1950, 1954, and 1955.
- Detroit Lions (1952–1957), led by head coach Buddy Parker, and with players such as Bobby Layne, Doak Walker, Joe Schmidt, and Jim Doran, the Lions won three NFL championship games throughout the decade (1952, 1953, 1957).
- Green Bay Packers (1960–1967), led by head coach Vince Lombardi, and quarterback Bart Starr. The Packers won five NFL championships in seven years (including Super Bowls I and II): 1961, 1962, 1965, 1966, 1967; and were championship finalists in 1960.
- Pittsburgh Steelers (1972–1980), led by Hall of Fame head coach Chuck Noll and players Terry Bradshaw, Franco Harris, Lynn Swann, John Stallworth and the Steel Curtain defense. Wide Receiver Franco Harris's "Immaculate Reception" catch against the Raiders in the Playoffs provided the team's first-ever playoff win and served as a turning point, signaling the end of the team's "cellar dweller" status. The Steelers would go on to win four Super Bowl titles in six years (1974, 1975, 1978, 1979), becoming the first and to date only team in NFL history to do so. In this time frame, Pittsburgh was able to achieve eight straight playoff appearances, seven division titles, 6 AFC Championship Game appearances (1972, 1974–1980), and a .763 win percentage from 1972 to 1980.
- San Francisco 49ers (1981–1998), led by Joe Montana, Jerry Rice, Steve Young, Ronnie Lott and head coaches Bill Walsh and George Seifert. This dynasty is usually considered to cover 1981 through 1998, a period in which the team won five Super Bowl championships (1981, 1984, 1988, 1989, and 1994) and 8 division titles (1981, 1983–1989), The next decade of success included another 5 playoff appearances, and division titles (1990–1998).
- Dallas Cowboys (1991–1996), led by head coaches Jimmy Johnson, and Barry Switzer and players Emmitt Smith, Troy Aikman, and Michael Irvin (The Triplets), also aided by of one of the greatest offensive lines in NFL history led by Mark Tuinei, Erik Williams, Mark Stepnoski, Nate Newton, John Gesek and Kevin Gogan, and defensive players Charles Haley, Ken Norton Jr., and Darren Woodson. First team to win three Super Bowls in four years (1992, 1993, 1995). Also won 3 conference championships in 4 straight appearances and 5 straight division titles.
- New England Patriots (2001–2019), led by Tom Brady and head coach Bill Belichick. Six Super Bowl titles in 19 years (2001, 2003, 2004, 2014, 2016, 2018) including becoming only the second team to win three Super Bowls in four years, three other Super Bowl appearances (2007, 2011, 2017), 13 AFC Championship Game appearances (2001, 2003, 2004, 2006, 2007, 2011–2018), and 17 AFC East Division titles (2001, 2003–2007, and 2009–2019). The 2007 season also saw the Patriots become only the second team in NFL history to record a perfect regular season and the first to do so in a 16-game season. During this time, the Patriots recorded the NFL's two longest winning streaks; 21 from 2003 to 2004, and 18 from 2007 to 2008. From 2001 to 2017 the Patriots averaged over 12 wins per season and a .766 win percentage, the highest in any of the four major American sports. They also hold the distinction of being labeled "The Team of the 2000s" and "The Team of the 2010s" respectively.
- Kansas City Chiefs (2018–present), led by Patrick Mahomes, Travis Kelce, Chris Jones, and head coach Andy Reid. The Chiefs appeared in five out of seven Super Bowl games during this span (winning in 2019, 2022, and 2023 games), seven consecutive AFC Championship Games, and won nine straight AFC West division titles from 2016 to 2024.

==== American Football League ====
- Houston Oilers, 3 straight AFL Championship game appearances and two titles from 1960 to 1961.
- Buffalo Bills of the mid-1960s, three straight AFL Championship game appearances and two titles from 1964 to 1965.
- Dallas Texans/Kansas City Chiefs of the 1960s, being the most successful AFL team in the league before the merger of the AFL and NFL, and also having the highest win-loss ratio of any of team in the league before the merger took place, the Chiefs appeared in three AFL Championships and won (1962, 1966, 1969), made two Super Bowl appearances (1966 & 1969) and won one Super Bowl (1969) thanks to coach Hank Stram.

==== All-America Football Conference ====
- Cleveland Browns of the late 1940s. Won the AAFC championship in all four years of the league's existence (1946–49) including an undefeated season in 1948.

==== NCAA Football ====
===== Football Bowl Subdivision (formerly I-A) =====
The problems inherent in identifying sports dynasties are exacerbated in NCAA Football Bowl Subdivision, where the national champion is determined, at least in part, by poll rather than through a tournament. These polls, however, are largely based on win–loss records, thereby relying on minimal subjectivity. When fans of a sport cannot agree on which team within a league or other organization should be considered as holding that organization's championship, discussing whether a team has become a dynasty is more difficult. Because of these problems, teams that consistently win their conference championship and are frequently in contention for national championships are termed dynasties more often than a similarly performing team in another sport or division might.

- Yale – nineteen championships between 1874 and 1909
- Notre Dame, 1919–1930. Led by head coach Knute Rockne. He won three national championships in 1924, 1929, and 1930 and an .892 winning percentage over 12 years.
- Minnesota, 1934–1941. Led by head coach Bernie Bierman. He led Minnesota to five championships in eight seasons (1934, 1935, 1936, 1940, 1941).
- Army, 1944–46
- Notre Dame 1941–1953. Led by head coach Frank Leahy. He led Notre Dame to four national championships 1943, 1946, 1947, and 1949.
- Oklahoma, 1948–1958. Led by head coach Bud Wilkinson. The Sooners won three national championships in 1950, 1955, and 1956. The centerpiece of this run was his 47-game win streak (NCAA Record) from 1953 to 1957.
- Ohio State, 1954–1970. Under legendary coach Woody Hayes, the Buckeyes claimed five national championships in 1954, 1957, 1961, 1968, and 1970. Buckeyes were able to secure seven Big Ten conference titles, and had a record of 119–21–4.
- Alabama, 1961–66 Led by Bear Bryant, Joe Namath, and Ken Stabler– three national championships. In 1961, 1964, and 1965 and going unbeaten in 1966, and had a record of 60–5–1 over the six-year span.
- Nebraska, 1969–72 . Led by head coach Bob Devaney and capturing consecutive national titles in 1970 and 1971. Nebraska's 1971 team remains the only champion ever to defeat the teams that finished second, third, and fourth (Oklahoma, Colorado, Alabama) in the final rankings.
- Oklahoma, 1971–75. Led by Barry Switzer winning back to back championships in 1974 and 1975.
- Alabama, 1973–80 Led by Bear Bryant winning national titles in 1973, 1978, and 1979.
- Miami, 1983–94 – Led by head coaches Howard Schnellenberger, Jimmy Johnson, and Dennis Erickson. In 12 seasons, Miami won four national championships (1983, 1987, 1989, 1991), played for seven national championships (1983, 1986, 1987, 1989, 1991, 1992, 1994), finished in the top three of the AP Poll for seven consecutive seasons (1986–92), and set an NCAA-record with 58 straight home victories. They also had two Heisman Trophy winners in Vinny Testaverde in 1986 and Gino Torretta in 1992.
- Florida State, 1987–2000 – At the height of Bobby Bowden's dominance, the Florida State Seminoles went 152–19–1, won nine ACC championships (1992–2000), two national championships (1993 and 1999), three national runner-up finishes (1996, 1998 and 2000), never lost the #1 AP ranking during 1999, produced 20 1st round NFL draft picks (including the 1997 offensive and defensive rookies of the year), won at least 10 games every year, and never finished a season ranked lower than fourth in the AP poll. Quarterbacks Charlie Ward and Chris Weinke won Heisman Trophies.
- Nebraska, 1993–97 – Led by head coach Tom Osborne, defensive coordinator Charlie McBride, and players Tommie Frazier, Scott Frost, Ahman Green, Grant Wistrom and Jason Peter and the Blackshirts. They played for four national championships in '93, '94, '95, and '97. They won three national championships in four years (1994, 1995, 1997), 60–3 cumulative record and went unbeaten in the three national championship seasons. They won 26 straight games from 1994 to 1996.
- USC, 2002–2008. The Trojans led by Pete Carroll, was a dominant era marked by consecutive national championships (2003, 2004), seven consecutive Pac-12 titles, and BCS Bowl appearances. The Trojans under Carroll saw three Heisman Trophy winners: with Quarterbacks Carson Palmer 2002 and Matt Lienart 2004, along with running back Reggie Bush in 2005. 2005 saw USC accomplish a 34-game winning streak which Texas ended in the 2006 Rose Bowl, along with their quest for a 3-peat in national championships. However, in 2011, USC's title in 2004 was vacated by the NCAA due to infractions involving former player Reggie Bush.
- Alabama, 2008–2023. Led by head coach Nick Saban, Alabama won six national championships in twelve years (2009, 2011, 2012, 2015, 2017, 2020) and three national runner-up finishes (2016, 2018, 2021). Alabama appeared in the first five College Football Playoffs from 2014 to 2018 and returned to the CFP in 2020, 2021, and again in 2023. Since the 2008 season, Alabama has averaged 12 wins per season and have a record of 176–19 (.903). Alabama under Nick Saban had four Heisman Trophy winners in running backs Mark Ingram II and Derrick Henry in 2009 and 2015, wide receiver DeVonta Smith in 2020, and quarterback Bryce Young in 2021, respectively.

===== Football Championship Subdivision =====
- Youngstown State, 1991–1997, led by head coach Jim Tressel, the penguins secured four national championships in seven seasons (1991, 1993, 1994, 1997).
- North Dakota State, 2011–2025, 10 national titles in 11 championship game appearances over 14 years, including five straight from 2011 to 2015, under four different head coaches. A 51–5 playoff record during this span, as well as both a 39 and 33 game win streak, the top two longest in FCS history. The Bison have won 12 conference championships since 2011. The team had moved up to the FBS level in 2026

===== Division II =====
- Northwest Missouri State, from 1998 to 2016. Led by head coaches Mel Tjeerdsma (1994–2010) and Adam Dorrel (2011–2016). Northwest Missouri played in 10 DII National Championship Games (98, 99, 05, 06, 07, 08, 09, 13, 15 and 16), winning six National Championships (98, 99, 09, 13, 15, and 16) which is the most in DII Football history.
- Grand Valley State University, 2001–2009, led by coaches Brian Kelly and Chuck Martin; champions in 2002, 2003, 2005, 2006, runners up in 2001 and 2009, 102–8 record over this span.

===== Division III =====
- Augustana (IL), 1983–1986 – Augustana won 4 consecutive titles from 1983 to 1986
- Mount Union, 1993–2017 – Mount Union won 110 consecutive regular-season games between 1994 and 2005, posted 14 undefeated regular seasons, won 16 Ohio Athletic Conference Championships, and had the best overall record in the 1990s (120–7–1 .941). They won Division III championships in 1993, 1996, 1997, 1998, 2000, 2001, 2002, 2005, 2006, 2008, 2012, 2015 and 2017 and have appeared in 19 national championship games since 1993.
- Wisconsin–Whitewater, 2005–2014 – Led by coach Lance Leipold, UW–Whitewater appeared in seven consecutive Division III championship games between 2005 and 2011. They won Division III championships in 2007, 2009, 2010 2011, 2013, and 2014.

==== NAIA Football ====
- Carroll College (Montana) – 6 NAIA National Football Championships in 9 years, 2002–2010; winning it in 2002, 2003, 2004, 2005, 2007, 2010. Along with 8 straight Frontier Conference Championships (2000–2007), and 6 straight national semi-final appearances (2000–2005).
- Texas A&I (now Texas A&M–Kingsville) – 7 NAIA National Championships in 11 years, 1968–1979. 3 consecutive and 5 in the decade of the 1970s: 1970, 1974, 1975, 1976, 1979. Lost only 1 NAIA Playoff Game (1968 National Championship Game—to Boise State, now a Bowl Subdivision team.
- Carson–Newman – 5 NAIA National Championships in 7 years, 1983–89. Winning it in 1983, 1986, 1988, 1989 outright and tied the 1984 title with Central Arkansas.
- Linfield – 3 NAIA National Championships in 6 years, 1982–86; winning it in 1982, 1984, 1986.
- Westminster College (Pennsylvania) – 3 NAIA National Championships in 8 years, 1970–78; winning it in 1970, 1977, 1978. Along with 3 NAIA National Championships in 6 years, 1988–94; winning it in 1988, 1989, 1994.

=== Canadian football ===
==== Grey Cup ====
- University of Toronto Varsity Blues from 1909 to 1911 (three championships in three years)
- Queen's University from 1920 to 1922 (three championships in three years)
- Toronto Argonauts from 1945 to 1952 (five championships in eight years)
- Edmonton Eskimos from 1954 to 1956 (three championships in three years)
- Winnipeg Blue Bombers from 1958 to 1962 (four championships in five years)
- Edmonton Eskimos from 1975 to 1982 (six championships in eight years, including five consecutive)

==== Vanier Cup ====
- Laval Rouge et Or from 2003 to 2018 (nine championships in 16 years, including eleven finals appearances)

=== Indoor American football ===
- Detroit Drive from 1988 to 1993 (four championships and six ArenaBowl appearances in six seasons)
- Sioux Falls Storm from 2004 to 2017 (10 championships and 13 championship game appearances in 14 seasons)
- Arizona Rattlers from 2011 to 2017 (three ArenaBowl championships, five ArenaBowl appearances and one United Bowl championship in seven seasons)

== Horseshoes ==
- Alan Francis, 1993–present; won 14 out of 17 world championships, only player to pitch over 90%

== Horse racing ==
- Calumet Farm, 1941–1958. Bred and raced two Triple Crown winners and five other Kentucky Derby winners.

== Ice hockey ==
=== Club ===
==== National Hockey League ====
The National Hockey League and the Hockey Hall of Fame officially recognize nine dynasty teams:

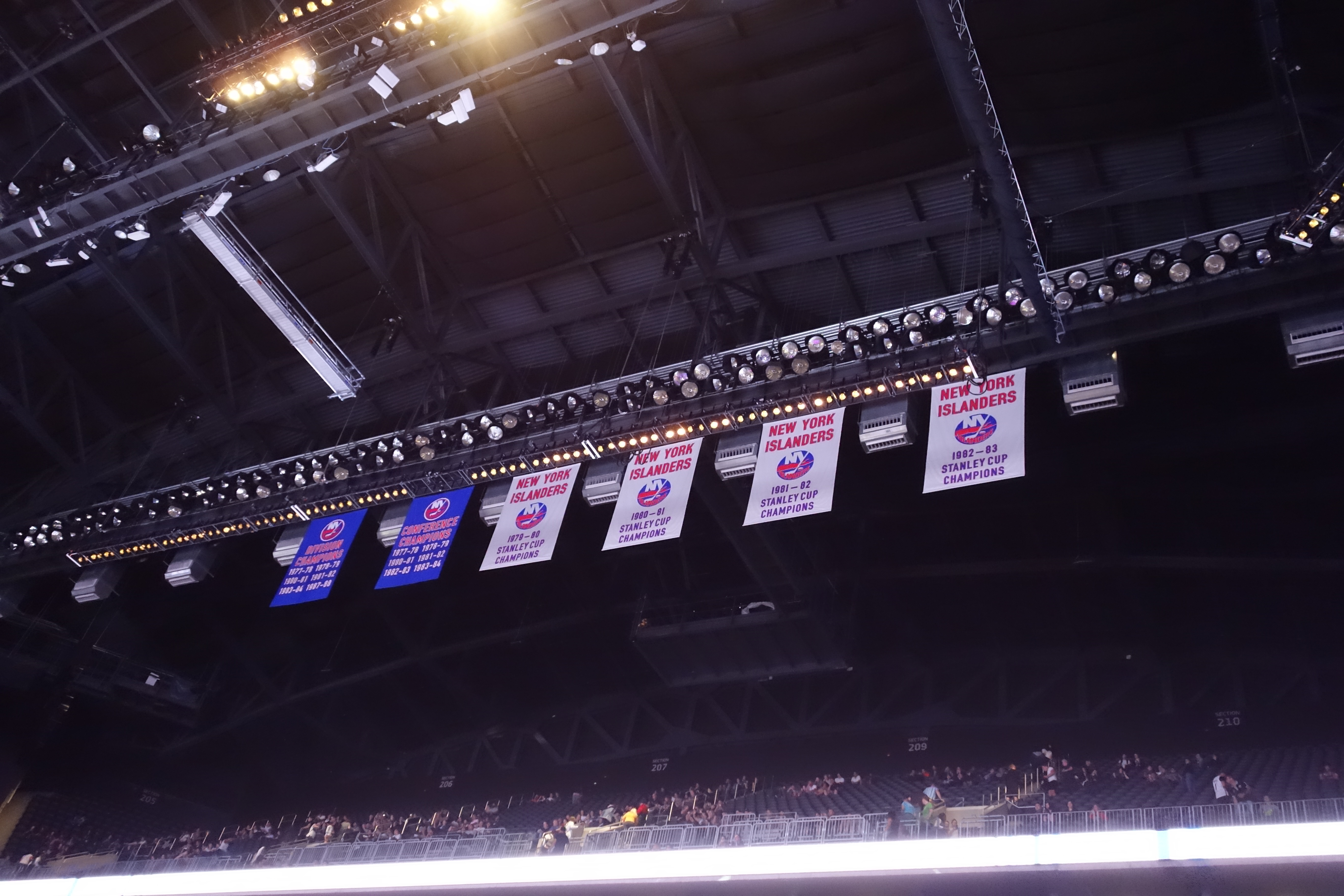
The New York Islanders championship banners from their 1980 to 1984 dynasty

- Ottawa Senators of 1919–1927 (4 Stanley Cups in 7 years) 1920–1921, 1923, 1927
- Toronto Maple Leafs of 1946–1951 (4 Stanley Cups in 5 years) 1947–1949, 1951
- Detroit Red Wings of 1949–1955 (4 Stanley Cups in 6 years and 7 consecutive first-place finishes) 1950, 1952, 1954, 1955
- Montreal Canadiens from 1955 to 1960 (5 consecutive Stanley Cups) 1956–1960
- Toronto Maple Leafs from 1962 to 1967 (4 Stanley Cups in 6 years) 1962–1964, 1967
- Montreal Canadiens from 1964 to 1969 (4 Stanley Cups in 5 years) 1965, 1966, 1968, 1969
- Montreal Canadiens from 1975 to 1979 (4 consecutive Stanley Cups) 1976–1979
- New York Islanders from 1980 to 1984, led by hall of famers Mike Bossy, Bryan Trottier, Billy Smith, Denis Potvin, Clark Gillies, and head coach Al Arbour, alongside star player Butch Goring. Throughout this time, the Islanders won 4 consecutive Stanley Cups and went to five consecutive Stanley Cup Finals, while simultaneously winning 19 consecutive postseason series.
- Edmonton Oilers from 1983 to 1990, led by hall of famers Wayne Gretzky (until 1988), Mark Messier, Jari Kurri, Glenn Anderson, Paul Coffey (until 1987), Grant Fuhr, Kevin Lowe, and head coach until 1989/general manager Glen Sather. Throughout this time, the Oilers won 5 Stanley Cups in 7 years (1984, 1985, 1987, 1988, and 1990) and a Finals appearance in 1983, they also won 2 President Trophies in (1986, 1987), and 6 consecutive Division titles (1982, 1983, 1984, 1985, 1986, 1987).

=== International ===
==== Men's Ice Hockey World Championships ====
- Finland: 2019–2022, the Finnish team won three gold medals and one silver in four consecutive major tournaments (2019 IIHF World Championship gold, 2021 IIHF World Championship silver, 2022 Winter Olympics gold, 2022 IIHF World Championship gold). This dynasty stretch includes winning the Olympic tournament and World Championship in the same year, the latter at home – both extremely rare achievements. During the stretch Finland won 31 games out of 36, losing only once in regular time (winning 86.11% of all games and 91.67% of playoff round games), allowing just 51 goals on total (GAA 1.416). The streak ended at the 2023 IIHF World Championship.

==== Olympics ====
- Soviet Union men's national ice hockey team/Russia men's national ice hockey team: 1954–1993, in a 39-year span the Russian men's hockey team claimed eight Olympic gold medals, including four in a row in 1964, 1968, 1972 and 1976, and 23 World Championships titles. Their dominance is controversial because they circumvented amateur rules that were in place at the time and used full-time professional athletes.
- Canada women's national ice hockey team: 2002–2014, four consecutive Olympic gold medals in 2002, 2006, 2010 and 2014.

== Figure skating ==
- Soviet and Russian pairs skaters, 1965–2010

== Lacrosse ==
=== Collegiate ===
==== NCAA men's ====
- Hobart Statesmen won thirteen national titles from 1980 to 1993, including twelve straight titles from 1980 to 1991.

==== NCAA women's ====
- Maryland Terrapins won eight national titles from 1992 to 2001, capturing seven consecutive titles from 1995 to 2001 and completing four undefeated seasons.

== Motorsports ==
=== Formula One ===
- (United Kingdom) McLaren, 1984–1991. During this eight-year period powered by TAG and Honda, the team won six World Constructors' Championships (1984–1985, 1988–1991) and seven World Drivers' Championships (1984–1986, 1988–1991; one by Niki Lauda, three by Alain Prost, and three by Ayrton Senna).
  - Key personnel: Ron Dennis, John Barnard, Steve Nichols, Gordon Murray, Osamu Goto, Neil Oatley
- (United Kingdom) Williams, 1992–1997. During this six-year period powered by Renault, the team won five Constructors' Championships (1992–1994, 1996–1997) and four Drivers' Championships (1992–1993, 1996–1997; one each by Nigel Mansell, Alain Prost, Damon Hill, and Jacques Villeneuve).
  - Key personnel: Frank Williams, Patrick Head, Adrian Newey
- (Italy) Ferrari, 1999–2004. During this six-year period, the team won all Constructors' Championships and five consecutive Drivers' Championships (2000–2004, all by Michael Schumacher).
  - Key personnel: Jean Todt, Ross Brawn, Rory Byrne, Paolo Martinelli, Luca di Montezemolo
- (Austria) Red Bull, 2010–2013, 2021–2024.
  - 2010–2013. During this four-year period powered by Renault, the team won all Constructors' and Drivers' Championships (all by Sebastian Vettel).
    - Key personnel: Christian Horner, Adrian Newey, Rob Marshall, Peter Prodromou, Paul Monaghan
  - 2021–2024. During this four-year period powered by Honda, the team won two consecutive Constructors' Championships (2022–2023) and all Drivers' Championships (all by Max Verstappen).
    - Key personnel: Christian Horner, Adrian Newey, Pierre Waché, Rob Marshall, Dan Fallows, Paul Monaghan, Jonathan Wheatley
- (Germany) Mercedes, 2014–2021. During this eight-year period, the team won all Constructors' Championships and seven consecutive Drivers' Championships (2014–2020; six by Lewis Hamilton and one by Nico Rosberg).
  - Key personnel: Toto Wolff, Niki Lauda, Bob Bell, Aldo Costa, Andy Cowell, Mike Elliott, Paddy Lowe, James Allison, John Owen, Loïc Serra

=== NASCAR ===
- Hendrick Motorsports has had two streaks of four or more consecutive championships (1995 to 1998, three won by Jeff Gordon and one by Terry Labonte, and 2006 to 2010, all won by Jimmie Johnson) and has 15 NASCAR championships overall. The combined operations of the works and satellite teams have won six consecutive championships since 2006.

=== INDYCAR ===
- Dario Franchitti 2007–2012 4 INDYCAR Championships (2007, 2009, 2010, and 2011) 3 Indy 500 wins (2007, 2010, and 2012).
- Josef Newgarden 2017–present 2 INDYCAR Championships (2017, and 2019) 2 Indy 500 wins (2023, 2024)
- Alex Palou 2021–present 4 INDYCAR Championships (2021, 2023, 2024, and 2025) and the 2025 winner of the Indy 500.

== Rugby league ==
=== NRL ===
- St. George Dragons, 1956–1966. 11 Consecutive NRL titles

(1956/1957/1958/1959/1960/1961/1962/1963/1964/1965/1966), 11 Consecutive NRL Grand Finals

- Penrith Panthers, 2020–2024. 4 Consecutive NRL titles

(2021/2022/2023/2024), 5 Consecutive NRL Grand Finals (2020/2021/2022/2023/2024).

=== International ===
- Australia national rugby league team, 1972–2005. Rugby League World Cup champions in 7 consecutive tournaments from 1975 to 2000, never lost a test series for 33 consecutive years.

== Rugby union ==
=== Clubs ===
- Stade Toulousain (1994–2001; 2019–present), won four consecutive French championships from 1994 to 1997 and the inaugural Heineken Cup in 1996. Since 2019, Toulouse have won six French championships, including four consecutive titles from 2023 to 2026, and European Champions Cups in 2021 and 2024, completing domestic–European doubles in both years.
- Crusaders 1998–2008 2017–Present, they reached 17 Super Rugby finals, of which they won 13 (Including two COVID-19 effected domestic titles in 2020 and 2021).
- Toulon (2013–2015), first club ever to win three consecutive European club championships—the last two Heineken Cups in 2013 and 2014, and the inaugural European Rugby Champions Cup in 2015.
- Saracens arguably had a dynasty of their own from 2015 until 2019, winning the English Premiership in 2015, 2016, 2018 and 2019, the European Rugby Champions Cup in 2016, 2017 and 2019, and the Anglo-Welsh Cup in 2015.

== Swimming ==
=== Collegiate ===
- Auburn University earned 13 total NCAA championships in swimming and diving, eight by the men's team and five by the women's team during a 13-year period from 1997 to 2009. During that stretch, the Auburn Tigers men won five consecutive national championships and the women won three consecutive national championships. In the Southeastern Conference (SEC), Auburn men earned 16 consecutive team titles between 1997 and 2012 while the women took five non-consecutive SEC championships. Auburn swimmers won 18 medals at the 2008 Summer Olympics, more than some countries.

=== High school ===
- Carmel High School (Carmel, Indiana): The girls' swim team has won a national record 39 state team titles, beginning with one in 1982, and continuing with 38 straight state team titles from 1985 to 2024, making them the all-time best high school sports program in the country. Their 2015 win broke the tie with the Honolulu Punahou boys' swimming team, who had won 29 straight from 1958 to 1986.
- Mount Anthony Union High School in Bennington, Vermont has won the Vermont state championship for 34 consecutive years.

== Tennis ==
=== Individual ===
- Big Three, 2005–2023. During this 19-year period—from the 2005 French Open to the 2023 US Open—Roger Federer, Rafael Nadal, and Novak Djokovic won 63 of 74 men's singles Grand Slams and two Olympic gold medals.
  - Big Four, 2011–2016. Andy Murray became regarded as the fourth member of the Big Three in the early-to-mid 2010s, adding three Grand Slams and two Olympic gold medals.
- Sincaraz, 2024–present. During this three-year period, Carlos Alcaraz and Jannik Sinner have won nine of 10 men's singles Grand Slams—as of the 2026 French Open—and met in three Grand Slam finals.

=== Team ===
- Australian Davis Cup team, 1950–1967. During this 18-year period, Australia won the Davis Cup 15 times.
- Williams sisters, 1999–2016. During this 18-year period, Serena and Venus Williams won 14 women's doubles Grand Slams and three Olympic gold medals. Serena won 23 singles titles and Venus won seven, both winning one Olympic gold medal.
- Bryan brothers, 2003–2017. During this 15-year period, Bob and Mike Bryan won 16 men's doubles Grand Slams and one Olympic gold medal, spending a record 438 weeks at world No. 1.

== Volleyball ==
- The Concordia University (Saint Paul) women's volleyball team have captured NCAA Division II Championships in seven consecutive seasons – the only NCAA volleyball program to accomplish the feat at the Division I or II levels. Their seven total volleyball titles is more than any program as well, with the sport dating back to 1980, at the women's Division II level. Their head coach, Brady Starkey, boasts a 306–26 overall record (.926) making him the winningest active NCAA volleyball coach in any division by overall percentage. They have also mounted 9 consecutive conference Northern Sun Intercollegiate Conference championships (from 2003 to 2011) including 6-undefeated conference campaigns.
- The NCAA Division III Washington University in St. Louis women's volleyball team were the first volleyball team to win six consecutive national championships, from 1991 to 1996. They have won a total of 10 NCAA championships, including 26 consecutive appearances in the championship tournament dating back to 1987, the most of any program at any level.

== Wrestling ==
- University of Iowa Hawkeyes have 24 total NCAA championships. The dynasty runs are from 1975 to 1986 (11 NCAA championships in 12 years), from 1991 to 2000 (9 NCAA championships in 10 years) and three consecutive national championships from 2008 to 2010. Iowa also had a dynasty run of 25 straight Big Ten conference tournament championships from 1974 to 1998.
- Penn State University Nittany Lions won four consecutive NCAA team championships from 2011 to 2014, four consecutive again from 2016 to 2019, and have won another four consecutive championships since 2022. Led by head coach Cael Sanderson, three-time champion Ed Ruth, and two-time champion plus two-time Dan Hodge Trophy winner David Taylor, the program has won 12 titles in the past 15 seasons.

== Dynasties in question ==
Most disputes about dynasties relate to teams that dominated within a conference or division, but either failed to win championships or infrequently won championships. This is exacerbated in NCAA Football Bowl Subdivision (formerly Division I-A), where the national champion is determined, at least in part, by poll rather than through a tournament.

- Boise State Broncos football from 1998 to 2008. At 113–26, their 81.29% win rate was the highest in the nation. Won ten of twelve conference championships from 1999 to 2009, undefeated in conference play in 2002, 2003, 2004, 2006, 2008, and 2009, perfect seasons in 2006 and 2009, but were never selected to play in a BCS National Championship Game.
- Detroit Red Wings from 1995 to 2009. Although not officially listed by the NHL as a dynasty, the Red Wings won four Stanley Cups in eleven seasons (1997, 1998, 2002, 2008) and went to the Stanley Cup Final six times in fourteen seasons (1995, 1997, 1998, 2002, 2008, and 2009). The Red Wings had the best team record during both the 1990s and 2000s, accumulating the most points of any franchise during each decade. Detroit also won the Presidents' Trophy for the best regular season record in the NHL in 1995, 1996, 2002, 2004, 2006 and 2008, in all winning their division thirteen times during this span. The Red Wings qualified for the playoffs in 25 consecutive seasons from 1991 through 2016.
- Chicago Blackhawks from 2009 to 2015 are also not officially listed by the NHL as a dynasty, but won three Stanley Cups in six seasons (2010, 2013, and 2015), as well as a Presidents Trophy in 2013 and acknowledgment by the NHL as their "Franchise of the Decade" for the 2010s. When they were presented with their third Stanley Cup in 2015, NHL Commissioner Gary Bettman colloquially referred to the team as a "dynasty" as well.
- England national rugby union team 1991–2003, 7 Five/Six Nations Championships, four Grand Slams, 2003 World Cup. While England was the form team in Europe in the 1990s, they were unable to break through and win the World Cup until 2003, losing to Australia in the final of 1991 and failing to match the same performance in 1995 and 1999. Additionally, England struggled to beat the leading southern hemisphere sides, the Springboks and the New Zealand All Blacks until 2000 and 2002 respectively, with the team peaking from 2002 to early 2004, under the leadership of Clive Woodward, before a slow, long decline, foreshadowing the North–South divide in rugby that was to become the norm from the mid-2000s.
- San Francisco Giants: From 2010 to 2014. Led by manager Bruce Bochy, Buster Posey, Madison Bumgarner, Pablo Sandoval and Hunter Pence. The Giants won three World Series championships in a 5-year span (2010, 2012, and 2014). They are only the second NL team ever, since the 1940s St. Louis Cardinals, to do so. However, despite winning three championships, some do not consider the Giants a dynasty because they did not win consecutive titles nor did they even make the playoffs in the years between (2011 and 2013, the latter of which had them post a losing record). At the same time, official MLB material since 2022 has classified them as a dynasty with multiple outlets in years since 2014 calling them a dynasty.
- University of Southern California football, 2002–2005 – two consecutive AP national championships (2003 and 2004), appearance in the 2005 National Championship Game, seven straight Pac-10 titles, six major bowl wins in seven years (Rose: 2003 and 2007–2009, Orange: 2004 and 2005), and maintained a 34-game winning streak from 2003 to 2005. However, USC was forced to vacate two wins from the 2004 season including the Orange Bowl win and BCS national Championship, all wins from the 2005 season, and the Pac-10 titles from both of those seasons as the result of rules violations involving star running back Reggie Bush.
- Washington Redskins from 1982 to 1991, led by head coach Joe Gibbs and with running back John Riggins and the Hogs, the Redskins made seven playoff appearances and won three of their four Super Bowl appearances over the course of a decade. However, once Gibbs retired, the Redskins never returned to a Super Bowl with their last appearance being Super Bowl XXVI and the most plausible reason why they weren't considered a dynasty at the time was due to the fact that they were overshadowed by the 49ers dynasty.
- Houston Astros: From 2017 to 2023. Under the ownership of Jim Crane and led by players such as Jose Altuve, Justin Verlander, and Alex Bregman, the Astros have won six AL West titles in seven seasons, played in the ALCS a record seven consecutive years, and won four AL pennants and two World Series titles. Although their high consistency within the American League has been noted, many baseball fans debate whether this team is a dynasty due to the Houston Astros sign stealing scandal, the team only having won two World Series titles separated by five seasons, and because only five players were on both championship teams.
- Oakland/Los Angeles Raiders: 1967–85. No NFL team enjoyed more consistent success than the Raiders during this span. During this 17-year run, the Raiders won 11 division titles, earned 15 playoff berths, captured one AFL title and three Super Bowls. The '76 Raiders captured the franchise's first Super Bowl after going 13–1 during the regular season. They then dismantled the defending two-time champion Steelers in the AFC title game before routing the Vikings in Super Bowl XI. Four years later, coach Tom Flores and quarterback Jim Plunkett helped the Raiders become the first franchise to win the Super Bowl as a wild-card team. The '83 Raiders, on the strength of running back Marcus Allen and cornerbacks Lester Hayes and Mike Haynes, held Washington's record-setting offense to just one touchdown in the Raiders' 38–9 win in Super Bowl XVIII.

== Notes ==
^{a} The 1916 and 1917 VFA seasons were cancelled due to World War I
^{b} The Football League suspended operations between 1939–40 and 1945–46 inclusive due to World War II and planning difficulties in its aftermath.
^{c} Also called Tripletta Tricolore, Italian Football Federation (FIGC) regards the national supercup legally as a seasonal competition in its own official matches calendar.
^{d} The Allied conquest of Italy caused normal Serie A football to be suspended between 1943 and 1944 and 1945–46, though the 1946 scudetto is considered official.
