= Mary Burke (disambiguation) =

Mary Burke (born 1959) is an American businesswoman.

Mary Burke may also refer to:

- Mary Burke (basketball) (born 1965), American women's college basketball coach
- Marylouise Burke, American actress
- Mary Burke Washington (1926–2014), American economist
- Mary Griggs Burke (1916–2012), American art collector
- Mary Murray-Burke, Irish member of Crystal Swing
- Billie Burke (Mary William Ethelbert Appleton Burke, 1884–1970), American actress
- Mary Burke (consort) (c. 1560–c. 1627), Irish noblewoman and consort of Brian O'Rourke
