= Damian Costantino =

American baseball player

Damian Costantino (born c. 1978) is an American baseball player who set the record for the longest hitting streak in National Collegiate Athletic Association baseball history, with a 60-game streak that ran through the 2001, 2002 and 2003 seasons playing for the Division III Salve Regina Seahawks and broke the mark set in 1987 by Robin Ventura with 58.

Costantino attended Warwick Veterans High School. He had seriously considered playing for a Division I school but chose to enlist in the United States Army after graduating from high school. He became a reservist at the end of his active duty military service and portions of his company in the 443rd Civil Affairs Battalion had been deployed to the Persian Gulf.

After two years in the Army, Costantino enrolled at Salve Regina University in Newport, Rhode Island, where he majored in administration of justice. He joined the baseball team as a freshman and began his streak on April 1, 2001, in a game against Rhode Island College, and hit in 22 consecutive games through the end of the 2001 season, then got hits in all 35 games the team played in the 2002 season. During the 2002 season, he broke the previous Division III record with a hit against Johnson & Wales University in his 47th consecutive game.

Salve Regina kicked off the 2003 season with a spring sequence of games in Florida. He made it to 57 with a double in his last at bat of their first game of the season and tied the record in the second game of the doubleheader against Wesley College. He then broke Robin Ventura's NCAA record with a single in a game against Mount Union College, in a game that Mount Union won 13–2. He got hits in the next two games, extending the streak to 60 games, but ended his streak with no hits in three at bats in a game against Baldwin–Wallace College. In the streak-ending game, Costantino grounded out, hit a sacrifice fly, and flied out.

He hoped to have the opportunity to play professional baseball saying "I know I'm older but baseball is my passion. I hope to play until I physically can't play any more and if not, I'll coach. I'll always want to be around the game."

As of 2010, Costantino, ranked second in Salve Regina history with a .412 batting average, second in career hits with 200, second in total bases with 293 and third in runs batted in with 127.
