= Nazio-Juve =

Nazio-Juve (Italian pronunciation: [ˌnattsjoˈjuːve], lit. 'National-Juventus') was the nickname of the group of Juventus FC players called up to have been the backbone to the Italy national football team managed by Vittorio Pozzo to have won the 1934 FIFA World Cup and two editions of the Central European International Cup (1927–30 and 1933–35).

With this group, the side managed by Carlo Carcano had dominated the Italian football, and had one of the best teams in Europe during the first half of the 1930s, winning amongst others, a record of five national championships in a row, and reached the Central European Club Cup's semifinals from 1932 to 1935, and included the formidable defensive trio Combi-Rosetta-Caligaris, Giovanni Ferrari, Felice Borel II and the oriundi Luis Monti, Raimundo Orsi, and Renato Cesarini.

== Players ==
Italy's line-up with five Juventus F.C. players in 1934 FIFA World Cup Final against Czechoslovakia. Rome, 10 June 1934.

Italy players that won the 1934 FIFA World Cup and/or the 1927–30 and 1933–35 Central European International Cup.

- Luigi Bertolini
- Carlo Bigatto I
- Felice Placido Borel II
- Umberto Caligaris
- Luigi Cevenini III
- Renato Cesarini
- Gianpiero Combi
- Giovanni Ferrari
- Luis Monti
- Federico Munerati
- Raimundo Orsi
- Virginio Rosetta
- Mario Varglien I
- Giovanni Varglien II
- Giovanni Vecchina

== See also ==
- Blocco-Juve
- Italy national football team
- Juventus F.C. and the Italy national football team

== Bibliography ==
- Giacone, Gianni (1993). Juve Azzurri – I bianconeri che hanno fatto grande la Nazionale (in Italian). Hurrà Juventus – Fabbri Editori.
- Tavella, Renato (2001). Dizionario della grande Juventus. Dalle origini ai nostri giorni (in Italian). Newton Compton. ISBN 88-8289-639-0.
