= Warwick Veterans High School =

Location
- 2401 West Shore Road; Warwick, Rhode Island 02889
- Coordinates: 41.70482°N 71.40924°W

Information
- Founded: 1956
- Closed: 2016
- School district: Warwick Public Schools
- Principal: Gerald Habershaw
- Grades: 9–12
- Language: English
- Colors: Blue, Gold, & White
- Team name: Hurricanes
- Website: https://web.archive.org/web/20160619061827/http://www.warwickschools.org/vets/

Warwick Veterans High School was a secondary school in Warwick, Rhode Island. It was a part of Warwick Public Schools.

The school building is two stories high and features eight wings of classrooms. The logo for all Vets "Hurricane" teams was a reverse-rotating hurricane symbol. School colors were blue, gold, and white. The school held grades 9–12 until 2016, when it closed due to declining enrollment and the building was converted to a junior high school. The school had an enrollment of over one thousand students, and its principal when it was converted was Gerald Habershaw.

The school was opened in 1956 as a response to a growing Warwick population — the previous high schools (which came to be known as Samuel Gorton Junior High and Aldrich Junior High and also Lockwood Junior High which has been converted to condos) were too small for the large number of incoming students. In the late 1960s, the 900 wing extension was added to the school. Two additional high schools were constructed to answer Warwick's population increase, Pilgrim High School in 1962 and Toll Gate High School in 1972.

== Athletics ==
The girls' field hockey team was the 2005 division and state champions. Additionally, the boys' outdoor track team were city champions for thirteen straight years and division B champions for four years. The freshman football team reached the championship game in two consecutive years (2004–05 & 2005–06) but lost both games to crosstown rivals Pilgrim High School and William E. Tolman High School of Pawtucket.

The Warwick Vets Cheerleading program was very active until 2016. The Varsity team took 1st place in the RI State competition from 1998–2007.

In 2007, the boys basketball team had its first thousand-point scorer in several years. In 2008, the girls soccer team made it to the Division 1 state semi-finals.

In 2010, the basketball team won their first game in over 23 years. In 2011, the school joined in the 2nd phase of RI Unified Basketball, a collaboration with RI Special Olympics and the RI Interscholastic League. This program is a national model that promotes a Varsity level co-ed team to have students with disabilities play with non-disabled peers on the same team. In their first regular season, the team was undefeated. They went on to the playoffs as a Division I team and were defeated in the final championship round by 1 point at the buzzer and placed 2nd in the State out of 18 teams.

== Other activities ==
Until its conversion as a junior high school, the school featured active chapters of FBLA, DECA, Student Council, Math League, Academic Decathlon, SADD (Students Against Destructive Decisions), STAND: A Student Anti-Genocide Coalition, and other clubs.

Warwick Veterans also had a concert band that performed several concerts a year, a marching band that played at parades on Veterans Day and Gaspee Day, and a jazz band and concert orchestra that usually performed with the concert band.

== Notable alumni ==
- Bill Almon, baseball player
- Damian Costantino, NCAA record holder with hits in 60 consecutive games.
- Anthony DeLuca II, Rhode Island Senator
- Fred Whittingham, NFL player and coach
- James Woods, (freshman & sophomore, before Pilgrim High built) American actor, voice actor, and producer
