= Ugo Amoretti =

Italian footballer and manager

Personal information
- Date of birth: 6 February 1909
- Place of birth: Sampierdarena, Italy
- Date of death: 1977
- Height: 1.73 m (5 ft 8 in)
- Position: Goalkeeper

Senior career*
Years	Team	Apps	(Gls)
1927–1928	La Dominante	2	(0)
1928–1929	Sestrese	18	(0)
1929–1930	Brescia	11	(0)
1930–1932	Sestrese		
1932–1933	Padova	28	(0)
1933–1934	Genova 1893	29	(0)
1934–1936	Fiorentina	58	(0)
1936–1940	Juventus	63	(0)
1940–1941	Albenga	30	(0)
1941–1942	Liguria	4	(0)
1942–1943	Palermo	4	(0)
1945–1947	Imperia		
1947–1948	Alassio		

International career
1936	Italy	1	(0)

Managerial career
- 1956–1957: Sampdoria
- ?: Sambenedettese
- * Club domestic league appearances and goals

Ugo Amoretti (Italian pronunciation: [ˈuːɡo amoˈretti]; 6 February 1909 – 1977) was an Italian footballer and coach who played as a goalkeeper.
