= Warwick Public Schools (Rhode Island) =

School district in Rhode Island, United States

Warwick Public Schools (WPS) is the public school district of Warwick, Rhode Island.

== History ==
In October 2015, Philip Thornton became the superintendent of the school district; he was previously the superintendent of the Cumberland School Department.

Circa 2016 there was a plan to close and repurpose elementary schools that was to affect 600 students. The Warwick Teachers Union opposed the plan.

In 2019, the district announced that students which had families with school lunch fee debts would only be permitted to have sandwiches filled with jelly and nut butter. In response, the company Chobani paid fees of the students, and Hamdi Ulukaya, the head of the company, criticized the policy. The school district ended the sandwich rule.

In 2021 Thornton became the Cumberland superintendent again. Lynn Dambruch replaced him as Warwick superintendent until her retirement in June of 2025, at which time William McCaffrey was appointed as the new and current superintendent.

== Schools ==
High schools

- Pilgrim High School
- Toll Gate High School

Middle schools

- Veterans Middle School
  - The building was used as Warwick Veterans Memorial High School prior to fall 2016. The district spent $3,250,000 to renovate the building prior to its use as a junior high school.
- Winman Middle School

Elementary schools

- Cedar Hill Elementary School
- Greenwood Elementary School
- Holliman Elementary School
- Hoxsie Elementary School
- Lippitt Elementary School
- Norwood Elementary School
- Oakland Beach Elementary School
- Park Elementary School
- Robertson Elementary School
- Scott Elementary School
- Sherman Elementary School
- Warwick Neck Elementary School
- E.T. Wyman Elementary School

Preschool

- Warwick Early Learning Center at John Brown Francis
  - It was formerly an elementary school, but in 2016 there were plans to turn it into a preschool. From circa 1996 to 2018 Francis Elementary had a drama program.

Other facilities

- Warwick Area Career & Technical Center

Former schools

- Warwick Veterans Memorial High School - In 2015 there was a proposal to turn it into a middle school.
- Aldrich Junior High School - In 2015 there was a proposal to close it.
- Gorton Junior High School - In 2015 there was a proposal to close it.
- Randall Holden Elementary School - In 2016, there was a proposal to close it.
- John Wickes Elementary School - In 2016, there was a proposal to close it.
