= Mary Burke (basketball) =

American women's basketball coach

Biographical details
- Born: c. 1965; Warwick, Rhode Island

Playing career
- 1983–1987: Providence

Coaching career (HC unless noted)
- 1987–1991: Bryant (ass't)
- 1991–2023: Bryant

Head coaching record
- Overall: 399–396 (.502)
- Tournaments: 1–7 (NCAA DII)

Mary L. Burke (born c. 1965) is an American basketball coach who served as the head women's basketball coach at Bryant University. She held the position from 1991 until stepping down in 2023. Prior to coaching at Bryant, she served as an assistant coach for four years under Ralph Tomasso at Bryant.

== Playing career ==
While attending Toll Gate High School in Warwick, Rhode Island in the early 1980s, Burke played both volleyball and basketball. She earned All-State recognition in both sports, three times in basketball and twice in volleyball. She was named Rhode Island's Schoolgirl Athlete of the Year in 1983.

While enrolled at Providence College, Burke helped lead the 1985–86 Friars to the Big East Championship Game and a bid in the NCAA tournament and also secure her team's entry into the 1986–87 NWIT. She was named a District I All-American as a senior. In 1987, she was named Rhode Island's Female Athlete of the Year.

== Coaching career ==
Burke took an assistant coaching job with Bryant University after graduating college in 1987. She was promoted to head coach on August 1, 1991, becoming only the fourth women's head basketball coach in Bulldogs history.

In the 2003–04 season, the Bulldogs finished the year ranked in the top 25 of the USA Today Division II Coaches Poll and advanced to the NCAA DII regional final, where they lost.

Burke's Bulldogs in the 2007–08 season were picked to finish ninth in the preseason coaches' poll. They went on to defeat three nationally ranked teams en route to a sixth-place conference finish and seventh-seed NCAA DII Regional Tournament ranking. It was Bryant's seventh NCAA tourney appearance and the team's last season in Division II.

In 2012–13, Burke helped her Bulldogs to their first-ever trip to the Northeast Conference tournament. Bryant won eight of its final 13 games to clinch the eighth and final spot. Burke also earned her 300th career victory on January 26, 2013.

The following season, the Bulldogs, coached by Burke, reached the NEC Tourney semifinals and earned a berth to the Women's Basketball Invitational.

In 2014–15, Burke led the Bulldogs to their best Division I season to date in which they earned a share of the NEC regular-season title. The first conference championship of her career, Burke had a record-setting season featuring a tie for the most wins in program history (22), most NEC wins in a season (14), and the highest finish in the NEC standings (tied for first). Again, the Bulldogs advanced to the NEC Tourney semifinals.

Burke took her Bulldogs back to the NEC Tourney in the 2015–16 season, notching 14–4 conference mark, including a 10–0 start in league play, and becoming one of only seven teams to reach the 10–0 tally in NEC history (29 years). Burke recorded 10-plus conference wins in 14 seasons, including eight-straight years with double-digit league victories (2000–08). The Bulldogs advanced for the third-straight year to the league semifinals.

In 2016–17, Burke led the Bulldogs to their best-ever NEC finish, reaching the conference finals, after earning the No. 4 seed in the league tournament.

=== Head coaching record ===
Record table
| Season | Team | Overall | Conference | Standing | Postseason |
|---|---|---|---|---|---|
Bryant Indians / Bulldogs (NE10) (1991–2008)
| 1991–92 | Bryant | 11–17 | 6–12 | | |
| 1992–93 | Bryant | 12–15 | 7–11 | | |
| 1993–94 | Bryant | 12–15 | 7–11 | | |
| 1994–95 | Bryant | 18–9 | 10–8 | | |
| 1995–96 | Bryant | 19–10 | 11–5 | | NCAA first round |
| 1996–97 | Bryant | 7–19 | 5–13 | | |
| 1998–99 | Bryant | 10–17 | 7–13 | | |
| 1999–2000 | Bryant | 11–16 | 5–13 | | |
| 2000–01 | Bryant | 13–14 | 10–12 | | |
| 2001–02 | Bryant | 16–13 | 11–11 | | ECAC Second Round |
| 2002–03 | Bryant | 19–12 | 12–10 | | ECAC Second Round |
| 2003–04 | Bryant | 22–9 | 17–5 | | NCAA Sweet Sixteen |
| 2004–05 | Bryant | 18–12 | 12–10 | | NCAA first round |
| 2005–06 | Bryant | 13–14 | 8–14 | | |
| 2006–07 | Bryant | 19–10 | 14–7 | | |
| 2007–08 | Bryant | 20–12 | 12–10 | | NCAA first round |
| Bryant: | | 250–230 (.521) | 154–165 (.483) | | |
Bryant Bulldogs (Northeast) (2008–2022)
| 2008–09 | Bryant | 11–18 | – | | |
| 2009–10 | Bryant | 13–16 | 10–8 | | |
| 2010–11 | Bryant | 10–19 | 7–11 | | |
| 2011–12 | Bryant | 14–15 | 7–11 | | |
| 2012–13 | Bryant | 13–18 | 8–10 | | |
| 2013–14 | Bryant | 17–15 | 11–7 | | WBI first round |
| 2014–15 | Bryant | 22–9 | 14–4 | | |
| 2015–16 | Bryant | 18–13 | 14–4 | | |
| 2016–17 | Bryant | 18–14 | 11–7 | | |
| 2017–18 | Bryant | 9–21 | 8–10 | | |
| 2018–19 | Bryant | 11–19 | 9–9 | | |
| 2019–20 | Bryant | 10–20 | 8–10 | | |
| 2020–21 | Bryant | 7–14 | 5–12 | | |
| 2021–22 | Bryant | 10–22 | 6–12 | | |
Bryant Bulldogs (America East) (2022–present)
| 2022–23 | Bryant | 5-8 | 0-1 | | |
| Bryant: | | 188–233 (.447) | 118–116 (.504) | | |
| Total: | | 438–463 (.486) | | | |
