= Giuseppe Giaccone =

Italian footballer

Giuseppe Giacone
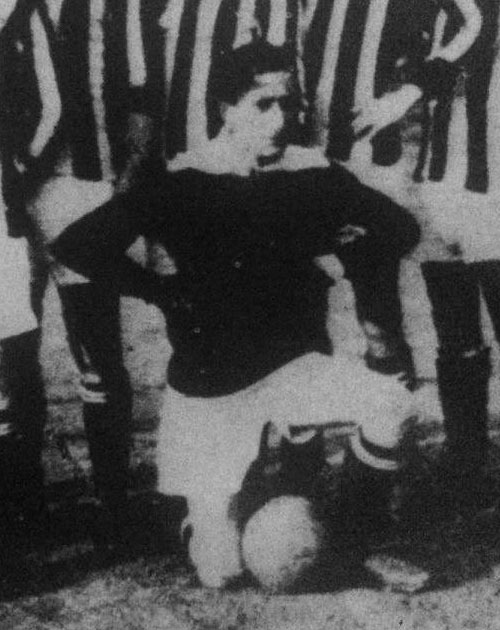

Personal information
- Full name: Giuseppe Giacone
- Date of birth: 9 September 1900
- Place of birth: Turin, Italy
- Date of death: 6 May 1986 (aged 85)
- Position: Goalkeeper

Senior career*
Years	Team	Apps	(Gls)
1919–1921	Juventus	30	(0)
1923–1924	US Torinese	26	(0)
1923–1924	Torino	5	(0)
1924–1925	F.C. Pastore	?	(?)

International career
1920	Italy	4	(0)
- * Club domestic league appearances and goals

Giuseppe Giacone (Italian pronunciation: [dʒuˈzɛppe dʒaˈkoːne]; 9 September 1900 – 6 May 1986) was an Italian footballer who played as a goalkeeper. He competed in the men's tournament at the 1920 Summer Olympics. He was the first Juventus player to play for the Italy national team when he played on 28 March 1920 in a friendly match; a 3–0 away loss against Switzerland.
