= Blocco-Juve =

Group of Juventus F.C. players

Blocco-Juve (Italian pronunciation: [ˌblɔkkoˈjuːve], Juve Block), also known as Blocco Juventus, (pronounced [ˈblɔkko juˈvɛntus], Juventus Block) was the nickname of the group of Juventus FC players called up to have been the backbone to the Italy national football team managed by Enzo Bearzot to win the 1982 FIFA World Cup Final and reached the semifinals of the 1978 FIFA World Cup and in the 1980 European Championship.

With this group the side managed by Giovanni Trapattoni dominated the Italian football and had one of the best teams in Europe and the world since the second half of the 1970s to the first half of the 1980s, winning amongst others six national championships, two Italian Cups and all international club competitions (world record), and included Dino Zoff, Claudio Gentile, Gaetano Scirea, Antonio Cabrini, Marco Tardelli, Roberto Bettega and Paolo Rossi.

== Players ==
Notable Italy players during their careers at Juventus in this time period.

- Pietro Anastasi
- Romeo Benetti
- Roberto Bettega
- Antonio Cabrini
- Franco Causio
- Antonello Cuccureddu
- Giuseppe Furino
- Claudio Gentile
- Francesco Morini
- Paolo Rossi
- Gaetano Scirea
- Luciano Spinosi
- Marco Tardelli
- Dino Zoff

== See also ==
- Italy national football team
- Juventus F.C. and the Italy national football team
- Juventus F.C. in European football
- Nazio-Juve
- List of players to have won all UEFA international club competitions
- List of players to have won the three main UEFA club competitions

== Bibliography ==
- Giacone, Gianni (1993). Juve Azzurri - I bianconeri che hanno fatto grande la Nazionale (in Italian). Hurrà Juventus - Fabbri Editori.
- Tavella, Renato (2001). Dizionario della grande Juventus. Dalle origini ai nostri giorni (in Italian). Newton Compton. ISBN 88-8289-639-0.
