= Toll Gate High School =

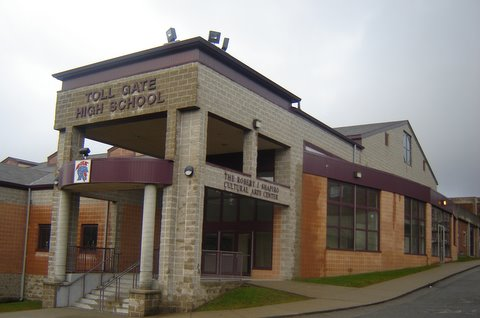
- The Robert J. Shapiro Arts Center at TGHS

Location
- 575 Centerville Rd; Warwick, Rhode Island 02886; United States; 41.697879°N 71.479504°W

Information
- Type: Public high school
- Established: 1972
- School district: Warwick Public Schools
- NCES District ID: 4401110
- School number: State school ID: 35138
- CEEB code: 400237
- NCES School ID: 440111000307
- Principal: Candace Caluori
- Faculty: 92.00 (on full-time equivalent (FTE) basis)
- Grades: 9-12
- Enrollment: 1,149 (2023-2024)
- Student to teacher ratio: 12.49
- Campus size: Medium
- Colors: Red, White, Navy
- Athletics: (FALL) Football, Cross Country, Soccer(Girls), Soccer(Boys), Tennis(Girls), Volleyball(Girls), Field Hockey, Unified Volleyball (WINTER)Basketball(Boys), Basketball(Girls), Wrestling, Indoor Track, Swimming, Gymnastics, Hockey(Boys), Hockey(Girls), Competition Cheerleading, (SPRING)Baseball, Softball, Lacrosse(Boys), Lacrosse(Girls), Tennis(Boys), Volleyball(Boys), Golf, Outdoor Track, Unified Basketball
- Mascot: Titan
- Accreditation: NEASC
- Newspaper: Titan Tribune
- Feeder schools: Winman Junior High School
- Website: https://tghs.warwickschools.org/o/tghs

Toll Gate High School is a public high school in Warwick, Rhode Island, United States, on Centerville Road. It serves education to grades 9-12 and has approximately 1100 students and 97 teachers. It is a part of Warwick Public Schools.

== History ==
The school opened in 1972 with Robert J. Shapiro as the first principal, who later became the superintendent for Warwick Schools (retiring from this position in 2007). The school's cultural arts center was dedicated in Shapiro's name in 1999.

== Extracurricular activities ==
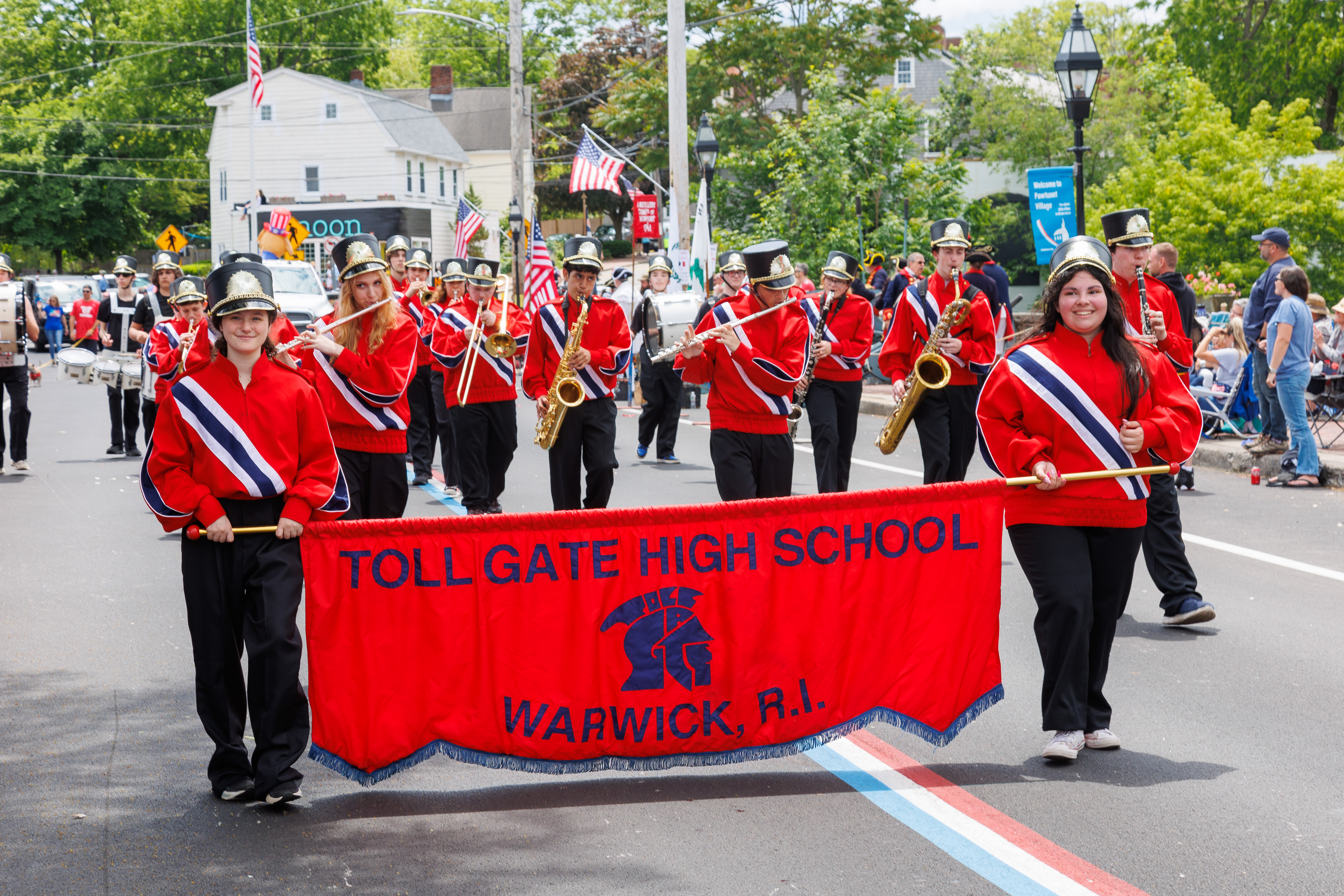
Marching band at Gaspee Days Parade

=== Athletics/Other Teams ===
The Toll Gate Varsity Ice Hockey team won the 2004 Rhode Island State Championship, ending the 26-year run of Mount Saint Charles Academy. Their victory is documented in the 2006 documentary film Ice Kings.

State championship titles:

- Baseball: 1991 (Class A), 2001 (Class A)
- Basketball (Girls'): 1973 (Class A), 1982 (Class A)
- Cross Country (Boys'): 1972 (State), 1974 (Class A, State and New England), 1999 (Class B)
- Golf: 1981 (State)
- Ice Hockey: 1988 (Met B-1 Small), 2004 (State), 2005 (State), 2024 (Div II State)
- Ice Hockey (Girls): 2006, 2014 (Division I-State), 2015 (DeCosta Division-State)
- Indoor Track (Boys'): 2005 (Class B)
- Indoor Track (Girls'): 2001 (Large Schools) 2015(Class - Medium Schools)
- Soccer (Boys'): 1990 (I-B), 2014 (Division II-State)
- Softball (fast-pitch): 2005-2006 (Division II)
- Tennis (Boys'): 1979-1981 (Class A), 2007-2008 (Division II)
- Tennis (Girls'): 1977 (Class A), 1985 (Class A), 1991 (Class A)
- Unified Basketball: 2014 (State)
- Unified Volleyball: 2015 (State)
- Volleyball (Boys'): 1988 (Division I)
- Volleyball (Girls'): 1979-1983 (Class A), 1985-1988 (Class A), 1990 (Class A), 1994 (Class A), 1997 (Class A), 1999 (Class A), 2001 (Class A)
- Mock Trial Team : Rhode Island State Champions 2007, 2010, 2011, 2013
- Wrestling: 2018-2019 (Division II B), 2019-2020 (Division II B)

== Notable alumni ==
- Mary Burke, Bryant Bulldogs women's basketball head coach (1991–present)
- Sara DeCosta, Olympic hockey player
- John Hynes, head coach of the Nashville Predators
- David Jessen, Olympic gymnast
- Erin Lynch Prata, Associate Justice on the Rhode Island Supreme Court
- Michaela McManus, actress
- David Petrarca, director
- Dave Shalansky, actor
- Evan Shanley, attorney and politician
- Brian Shanley, president of Providence College
