= Kennedy Plaza =

Public square

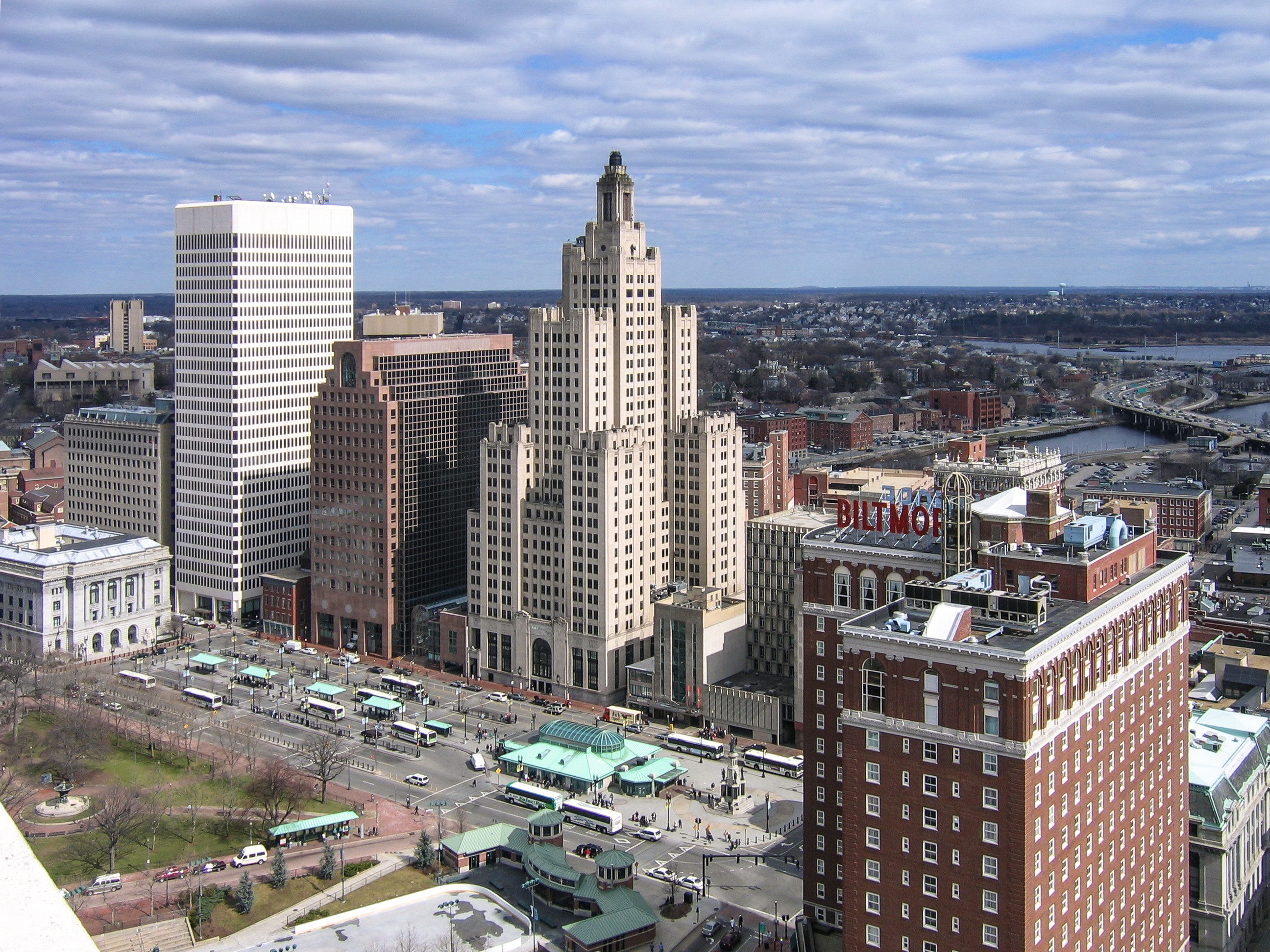
- Interactive map of Kennedy Plaza
- Former name: Exchange Place
- Area: 2.5 acres (1.0 ha)
- Location: Downtown Providence
- Coordinates: 41.82494°N 71.41161°W

Kennedy Plaza, formerly Exchange Place, Exchange Terrace, or City Hall Park, is a rectangular public square that occupies a central portion of Downtown Providence, Rhode Island. Since the mid 19th century, the plaza has served as a civic and transportation hub.

Today, Kennedy Plaza is bounded by Exchange Street to the northeast, Fulton Street to the southeast, Dorrance Street to the southwest, and Washington Street to the northwest. The plaza's northeastern and southwestern extremities are capped by three civic structures: City Hall, the Federal Building, and the John O. Pastore Federal Building. To the southeast of the plaza is a row of skyscrapers which comprise the central structures of the city's skyline. Northeast of the plaza are Burnside Park and Union Station.

In 2003, Kennedy Plaza was described by architectural historian Wm. McKenzie Woodward as "[T]he city's most constantly reworked space ... [which] is now virtually a large al fresco bus station. ... Ultimately transcending its flaws, Kennedy Plaza is a compelling open space enhanced by and enhancing some of the city's best buildings."

== History ==
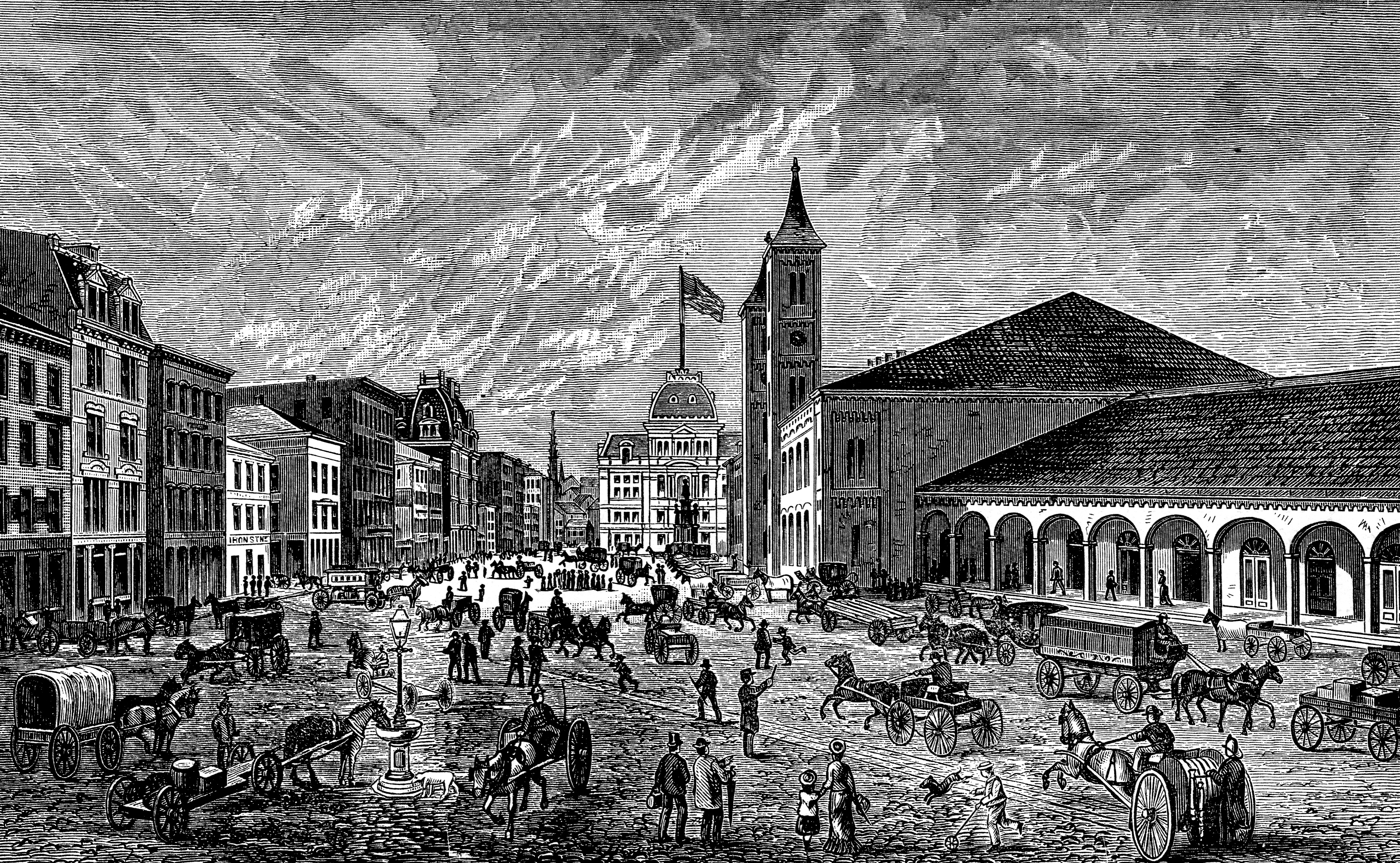
An engraving depicting Exchange Place in 1886

Kennedy Plaza has seen numerous transformations over the 19th and 20th centuries. According to architectural historian William McKenzie Woodword, the site is Providence's "most constantly reworked space, and fully interpreting its history would fill a book that could be a landmark in understanding American urbanism."

=== 19th Century ===
In the 18th century, the area that is now Kennedy Plaza was part of the Great Salt Cove—an estuary formed by the confluence of the Moshassuck and Woonasquatucket Rivers. In the early 19th century, Providence's manufacturing economy experienced rapid growth, outpacing the infrastructure needed to distribute these goods to domestic markets. To address this problem, companies like the Boston and Providence Railroad and Providence and Worcester Railroad constructed rail lines connecting Providence with other regional markets. While the Boston and Providence Railroad located its Rhode Island terminus in the peripheral Fox Point neighborhood, the Providence and Worcester Railroad fought considerably to establish a rail terminal in Providence's commercial center. In 1846, the city granted the company permission to fill in a portion of the Great Salt Cove and erect a rail yard and terminal facing Exchange Street. Over the following two years, the Providence and Worcester Railroad erected Providence's first Union Station – a Lombard Romanesque building defined by two towering spires. The construction of the station created the area – termed Exchange Place – as the nucleus of rail transport in the city.

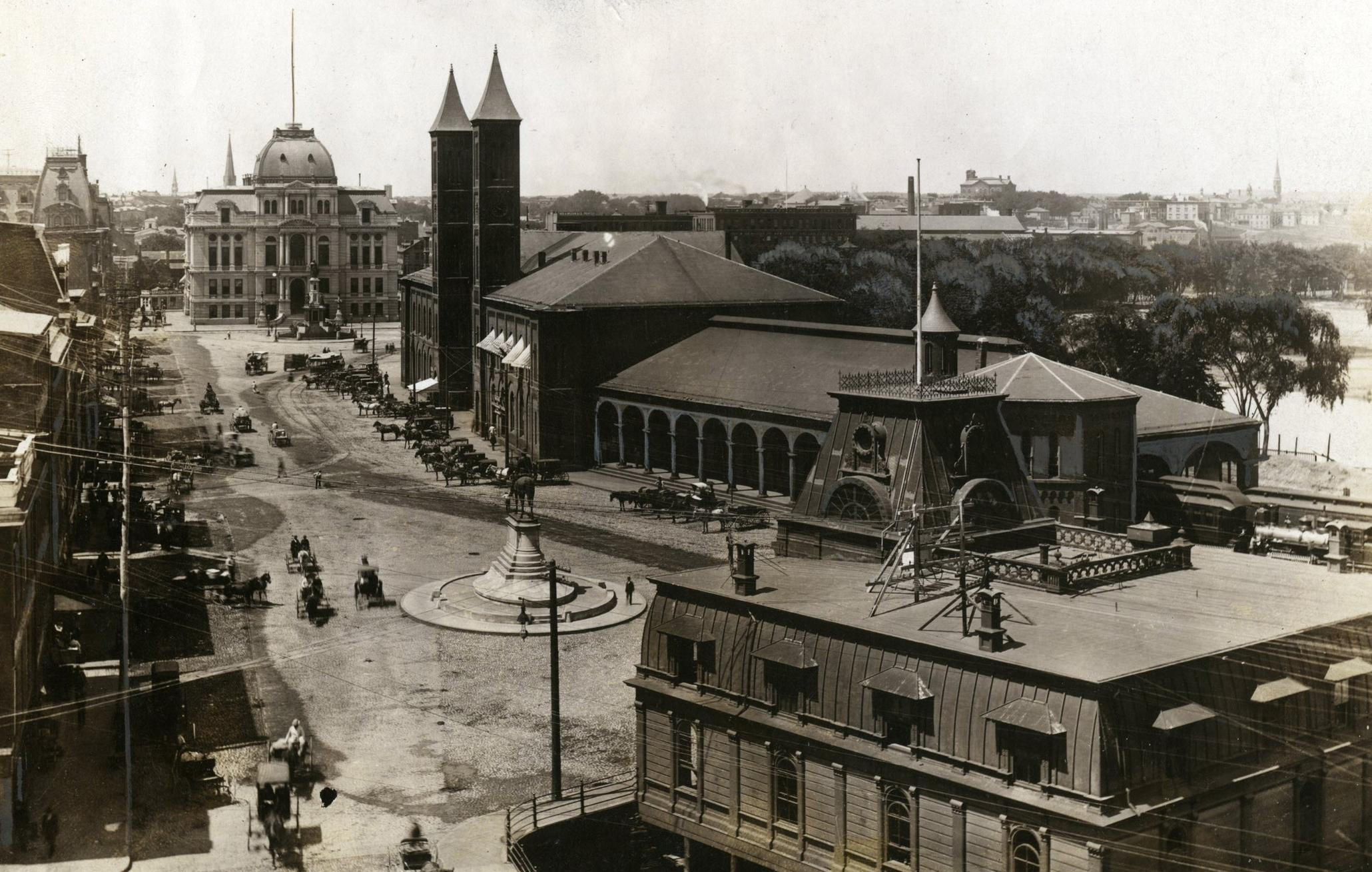
Exchange Place, ca. 1890. City Hall at center; to its right is the First Union Station, where Burnside park currently exists.

Between 1875 and 1878, the city of Providence constructed City Hall to the immediate southwest of the station. The municipality contemporaneously erected a fire station at the opposite extremity of the plaza.

In 1896 Union Station suffered a catastrophic fire. At the time of its destruction, work had already begun on the construction of a new, significantly larger Union Station to its immediate north; this station opened in 1898. The area formerly occupied by the original station was landscaped and opened as City Hall Park.

=== 20th Century ===
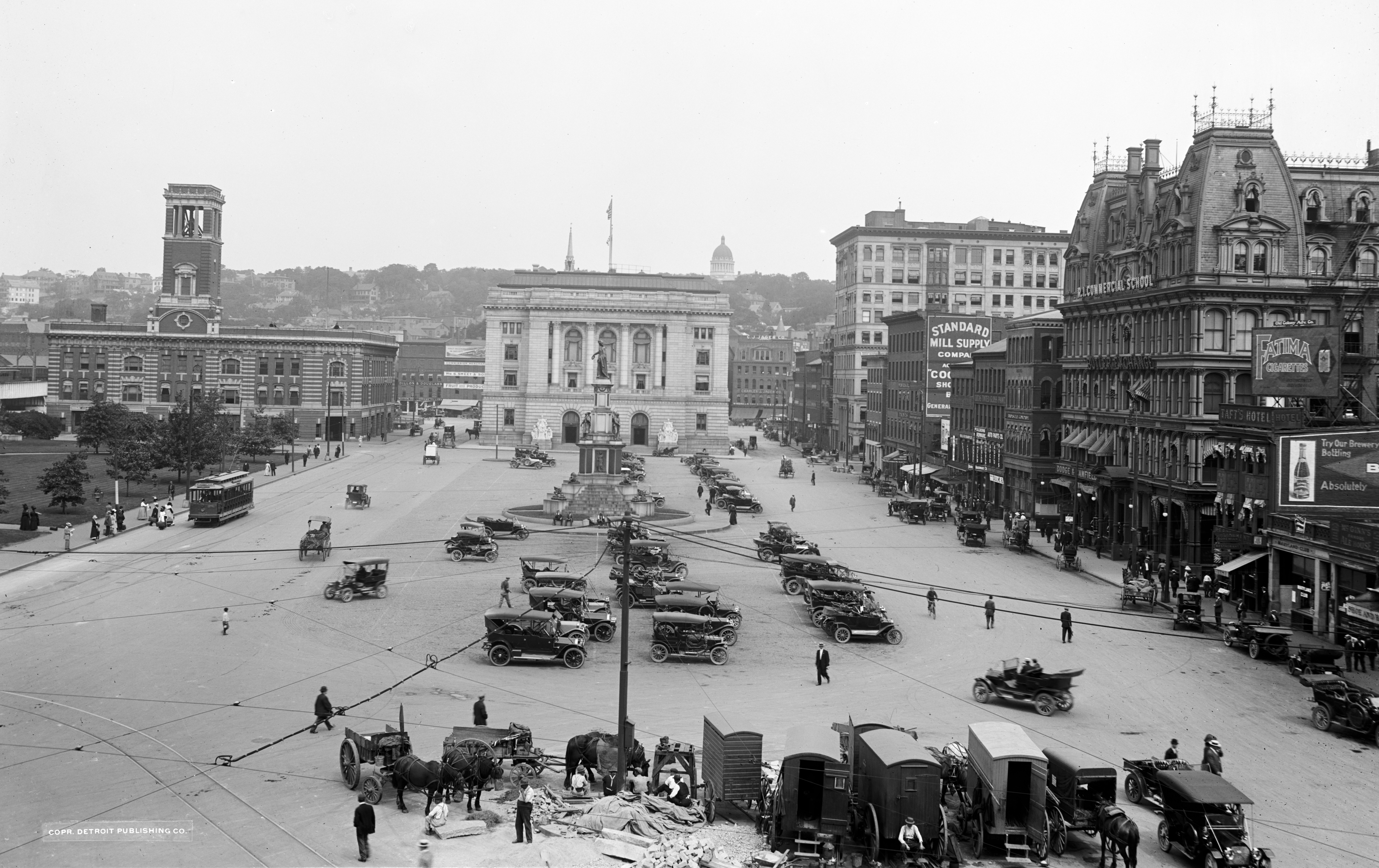
Exchange Place c. 1910, facing the then-new Federal Building

In 1903, the Federal Building was constructed facing City Hall. From 1920 to 1948, the plaza was circled by trolley tracks.

During WWII, the United Electric Railway and The Narragansett Electric company (owned by Marsden J. Perry) put "trackless trolleys" into service by installing electric buses in 1943. Employing what was then known as a “WAIT” station in the form of a loop, U.E.R buses served North Main St to Pawtucket and through the East Side tunnel to Thayer, Waterman, Angell, Hope, and Elmgrove Streets. As federal funds became available in the late 1970s for automobile-free zones, all local bus-waiting areas were consolidated to Kennedy Plaza.

By the 1950s, the plaza became less central to city transportation needs, as the automobile became the dominant mode of transportation.

==== 1938 Hurricane ====
The Category 3 1938 New England Hurricane flooded the entire expanse of Exchange Place when it made landfall on September 20. The storm surge hit just at the end of the workday; the water level rose from a few inches to waist deep, then to over 13 feet, with strong currents sweeping people off their feet.

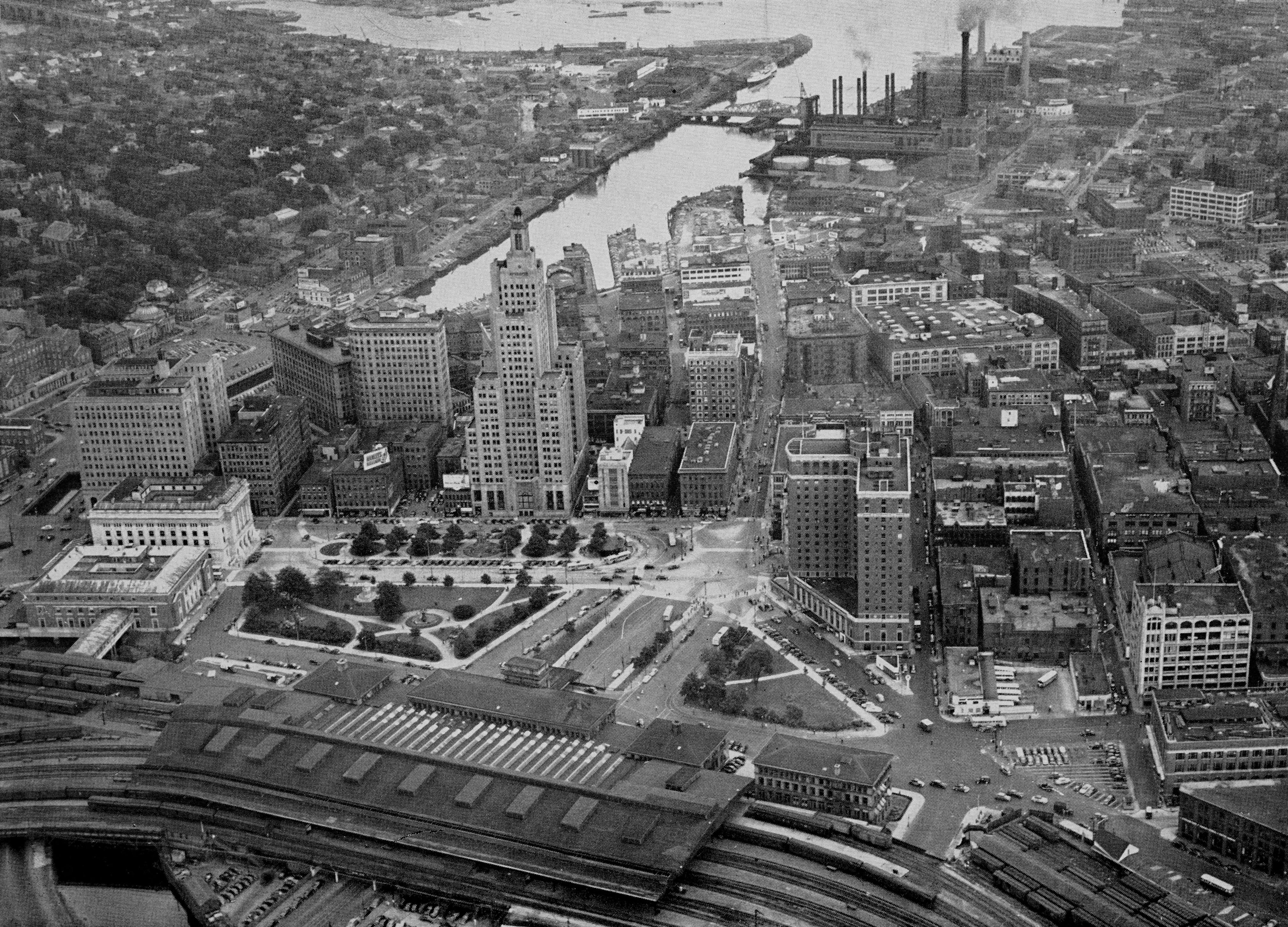
A 1951 aerial view of Downtown Providence. Kennedy Plaza is visible in the center left.

==== 1964: Kennedy Plaza ====
Massachusetts senator John F. Kennedy spoke from the front steps of City Hall on Monday November 7, 1960, the day before he was elected president. Kennedy spoke for 13 minutes to a crowd of about 40,000 to 50,000 people in the plaza. Kennedy's speech was a campaign attack against Republican candidate Richard Nixon. Emotions in the crowd were reportedly high, with many people screaming and chanting. In 1964, after Kennedy's assassination the plaza was renamed Kennedy Plaza in honor of the late US President.

In 1983, mayor Vincent Cianci had the plaza redesigned as a central bus depot. City bus stops on Washington, Westminster, and Weybosset streets were consolidated at Kennedy Plaza in hope of reducing congestion and air pollution.

Inspired by Rockefeller Center in Manhattan, a skating rink was added to the plaza in 1998. It was designed by William D. Warner Architects & Planners.

In 2002, the Intermodal Transportation Center, a $12 million bus station, was built in the center of the plaza.

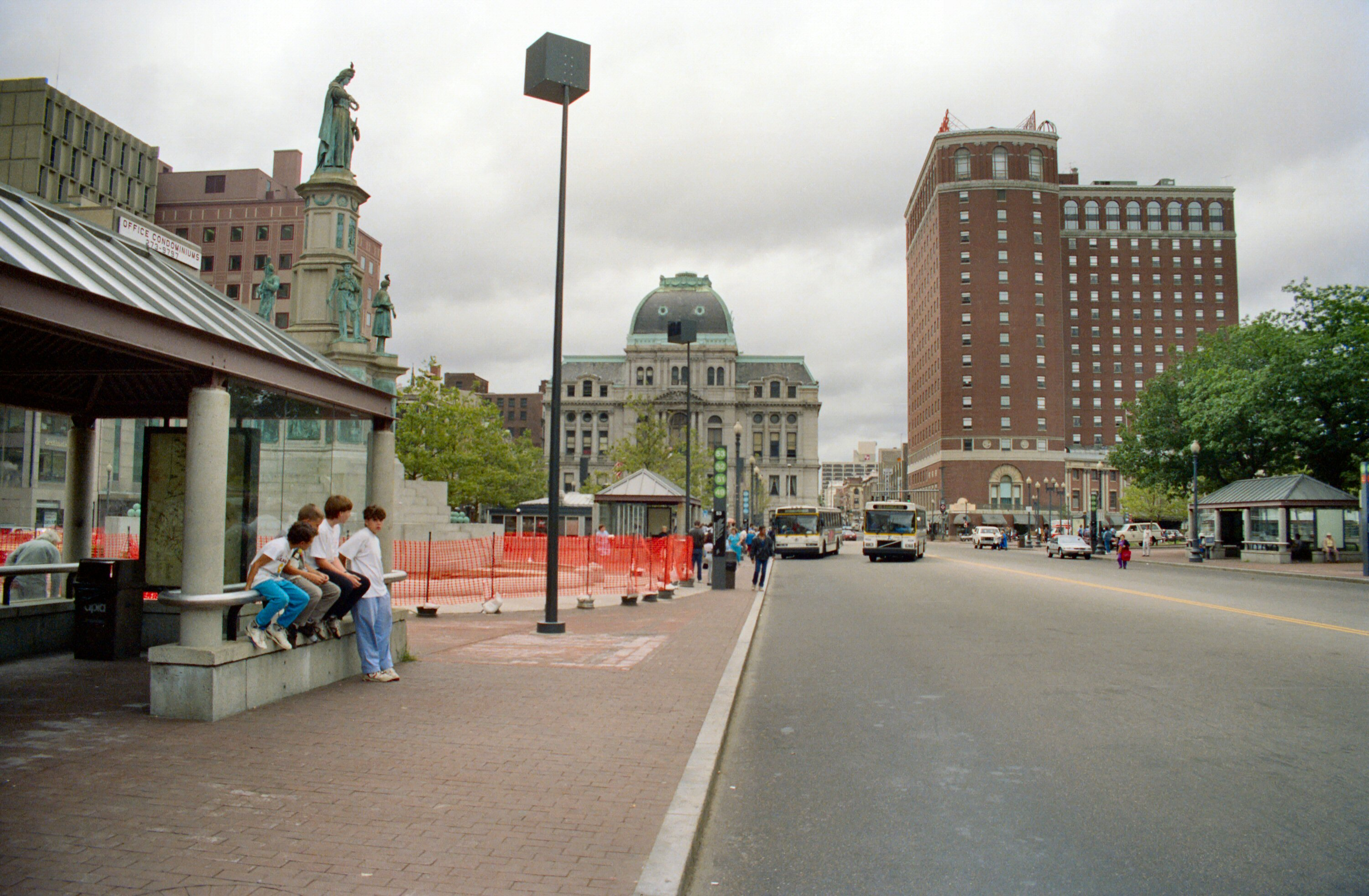
Kennedy Plaza in 1990, after it was redesigned to function as a central bus depot

=== 21st Century ===
==== 2014 RIPTA hub rehabilitation project ====
In Summer 2014, RIPTA began a redesign effort that changed the configuration of Kennedy Plaza, and included the relocation of current bus stop terminus points formerly located at the Plaza. The overall plan transformed the Plaza into a pedestrian oriented environment, where bus terminal locations were moved to the periphery of the Plaza and adjacent Burnside Park. RIPTA has noted an 11% increase in ridership of the Statewide system.

In anticipation of the July 15, 2014 groundbreaking for the rehabilitation project, on July 12 going forward, Bus terminus locations were found along Exchange Street near One Financial Tower, North Fountain Street, Exchange Terrace along the Rhode Island Foundation Building, and on Sabin Street along the Rhode Island Convention Center, beneath the Omni Hotel Towers. RIPTA announced on December 9, 2014, that the Hub would reopen January 17, 2015.

In 2016, to combat a growing reputation as a haven for drug dealing, vandalism, and prostitution, RIPTA hired a squad of unarmed private security guards to patrol Kennedy Plaza.

Through 2017, Kennedy Plaza served as the modern nexus of the state's public conventional-bus and trolley-replica bus transit services operated by Rhode Island Public Transit Authority (RIPTA), as well as a departure point for Peter Pan and Greyhound bus lines.

==== Civic redesign proposals ====
In August 2017, Mayor Jorge Elorza announced plans to transform Kennedy Plaza from its traditional role as a transportation hub into a public space which would serve as a "true civic heart" of the city, along the lines of New York's Bryant Park. The plans include new traffic patterns, fewer bus stops, and new buildings with food service and bathrooms. Kennedy Plaza will remain retain bus stops, but much of the bus traffic will be dispersed among new "hubs" at Providence Station and in the Jewelry District. The $17-million project was expected to begin in summer 2021. The plan was criticized for its expected effects on municipal transport. In March 2021, City Hall and city planners announced an expanded $140 million plan, spread out over multiple phases over several years. The newest version of the plan includes relocating the ice rink and expanding use into the summer as a splash park wading pool.

Mayor Elorza's Providence Unified Vision public space project was announced in July 2021. The plan includes redesigns of Kennedy Plaza and the riverfront. Included in the plan are public rest rooms, walkways, riverfront improvements, green landscaping, a cafe, and performance space.

== Notable speeches, parades, and gatherings ==
On April 20, 1861, at 10:30AM the sidewalks were filled with cheering throngs, who greeted volunteers, of the first division of the First Regiment of Detached Rhode Island Militia leaving for Washington, D.C.. Colonel Ambrose Burnside, in command, had ordered the men of the first division to assemble upon Exchange Place. A second detachment left from the plaza on April 25, 1861.

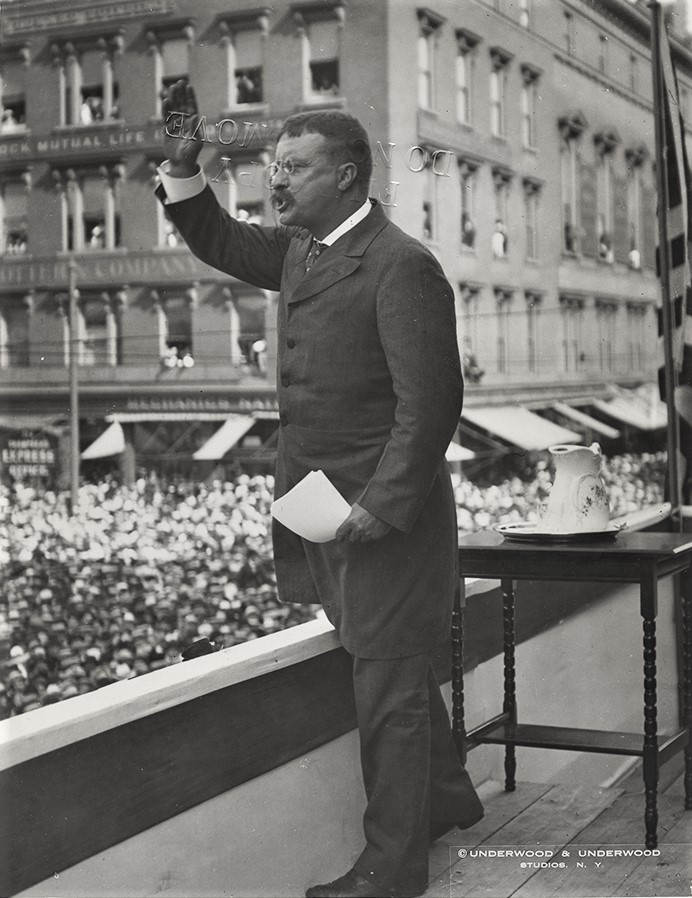
President Theodore Roosevelt delivers a speech in Exchange Place, August 23, 1902

Crowds gathered at the Plaza when President Teddy Roosevelt spoke on the City Hall steps on August 23, 1902:

One of the features of the tremendous industrial development of the last generation has been the very great increase in private, and especially in corporate, fortunes. ... It is not true that the poor have grown poorer; but some of the rich have grown so very much richer that, where multitudes of men are herded together in a limited space, the contrast strikes the onlooker as more violent than formerly.
On the whole, our people earn more and live better than ever before, and the progress of which we are so proud could not have taken place had it not been for the up building of industrial centers, such as this in which I am speaking. But together with the good there has come a measure of evil.… Under present-day conditions it is as necessary to have corporations in the business world as it is to have organizations, unions, among wage-workers. We have a right to ask in each case only this: that good, and not harm, shall follow.

- Theodore Roosevelt (Republican President) "Trust" speech from steps of Providence City Hall toward crowd assembled on Kennedy Plaza - 23 August 1902.

On March 7, 1914, Harry Houdini brought his show to American audiences and to Exchange Place due to the closure of European performance spaces during the World War. Over 20,000 people filled the plaza, to watch him perform his new act in "a straitjacket escape made while dangling high in the air, upside down" hanging from the fourth floor of the "Evening News" Building formerly sited at 50 Kennedy Plaza. The crowd filled the plaza expanse following Fulton Street. In 1917, Houdini returned to Kennedy Plaza to perform his escape act a second time, as "80,000 fedora-hatted folks who thronged the streets".

On June 3, 1916, President Woodrow Wilson called for the nation to ready itself for war in Europe. In response, Providence hosted a 6 1/2-hour World War I Preparedness Parade in response to president Woodrow Wilson's "call for preparedness."A review stand in front of City Hall and a gigantic human mosaic formed a "living flag" on scaffolding above the front steps, lined on each side with Civil War veterans. Over 52,000 people attended.

On May 11, 1919, a World War I Victory Parade was held on Washington Street and Kennedy Plaza, which marched through what was a Victory Arch in the center of the plaza. On top of the arch was a reproduction of the Hellenistic sculpture "Winged Victory of Samothrace." The inscription on the Victory Arch read: "TO THE MEMORY OF THOSE WHO WENT FORTH AND RETURNED NOT WHOSE SOULS ARE MARCHING ON."

John F. Kennedy spoke on November 7, 1960, the day before he was elected president:

On other occasions, in other years, this country has elected Republican Presidents and Democratic Presidents. They do it when they make a decision that that party and that candidate will serve a great national purpose. In my judgment and the responsibility ultimately is yours, in my judgment the United States will be best served by a candidate and a party who recognizes the basic issues of our time, and that is that this country has to go back to work again.

- John F. Kennedy (Democratic candidate for President) speech from steps of Providence City Hall toward crowd assembled on Kennedy Plaza - 7 November 1960, Senate Speech file of the John F. Kennedy Pre-Presidential Papers, John F. Kennedy Library.

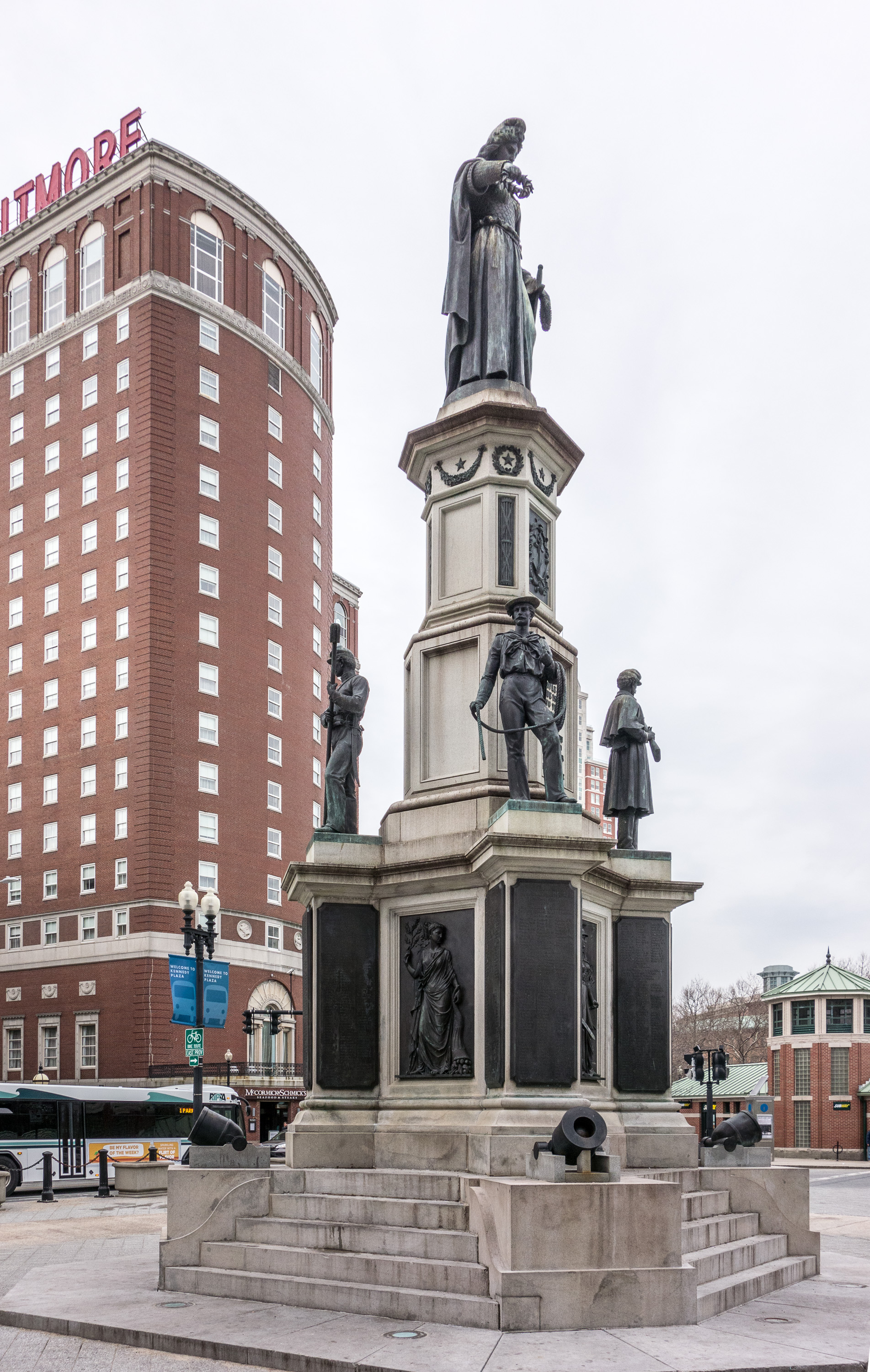
Soldiers’ and Sailors’ Monument (1871) by Randolph Rogers and Alfred Stone

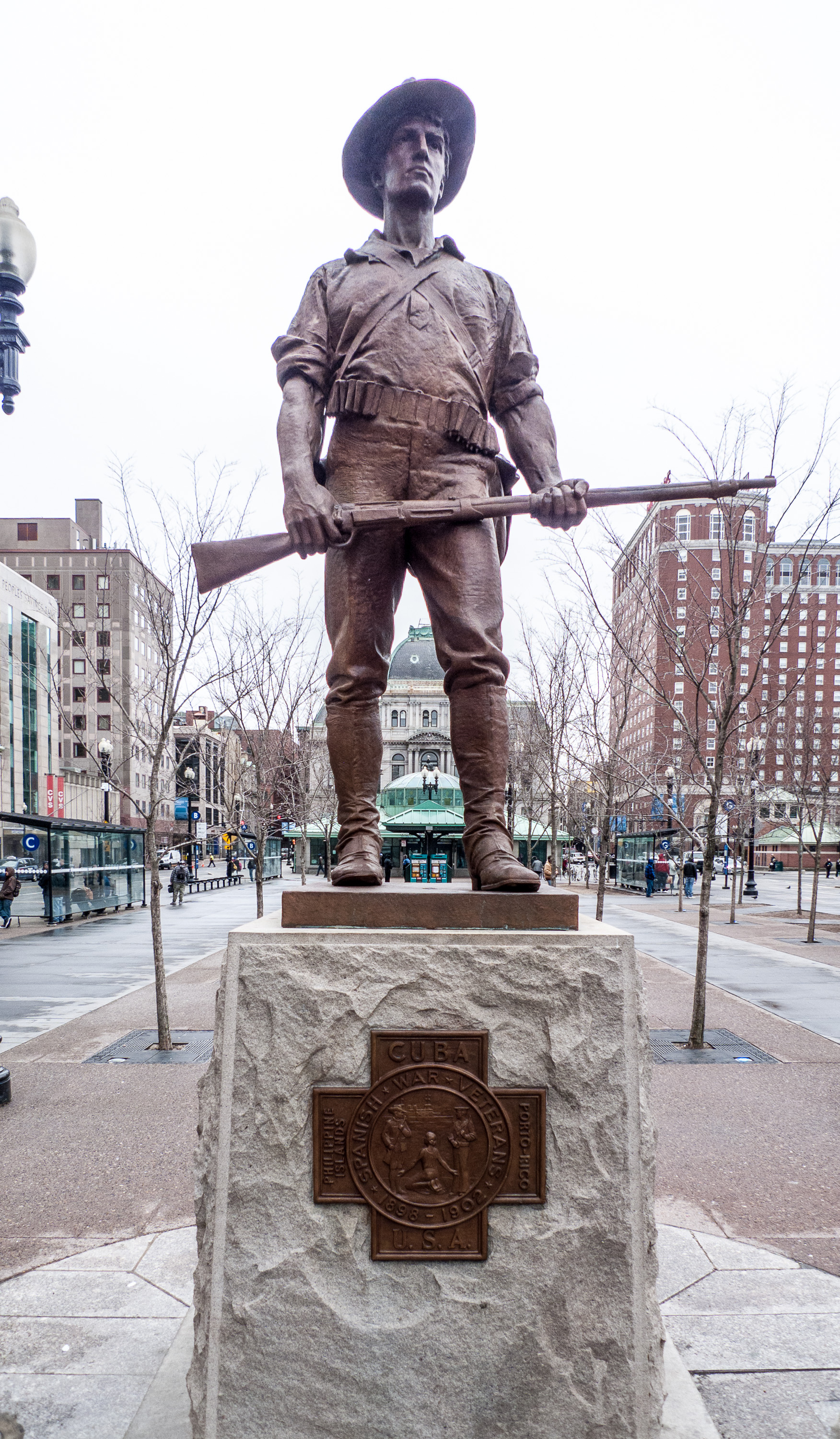
The Hiker (1911) by Theo Alice Ruggles Kitson

== Sculpture ==
Kennedy Plaza is home to three public art works. The most prominent is the 1871 Soldiers’ and Sailors’ Monument which occupies space directly in front of Providence City Hall. Dedicated originally in 1871, it was sculpted by Randolph Rogers with the pedestal designed by architect Alfred Stone. The monument was moved during the City Hall Park/ Exchange Place transformation in 1913 to the center of the plaza, and returned to its present location in 1997. Large bronze plaques on the monument’s base list residents killed in the war. Another plaque honors Rhode Island's African-American veterans. A dedication on a northeastern plaque reads ”Rhode Island pays tribute to the memory of the brave men who died that their country might live.” In late 2016, the Downtown Parks Conservancy of Providence started a fundraising effort to restore the monument and the infrastructure immediately around it.

A clock occupies space in front of the main doors of the RIPTA Intermodal Transportation Center.

A 1911 copy of The Hiker by Theo Alice Ruggles Kitson stands in the center island of the RIPTA facility berths, and commemorates the American soldiers who fought in the Spanish–American War, the Boxer Rebellion and the Philippine–American War. The original 1906 sculpture is located at the University of Minnesota.

Other sculptures in the Plaza include an 1887 equestrian statue of Ambrose Burnside by Launt Thompson, the Bajnotti Fountain (1899) by Enid Yandell, and, in City Hall Park, The Scout (1911) by Henri Schonhardt.

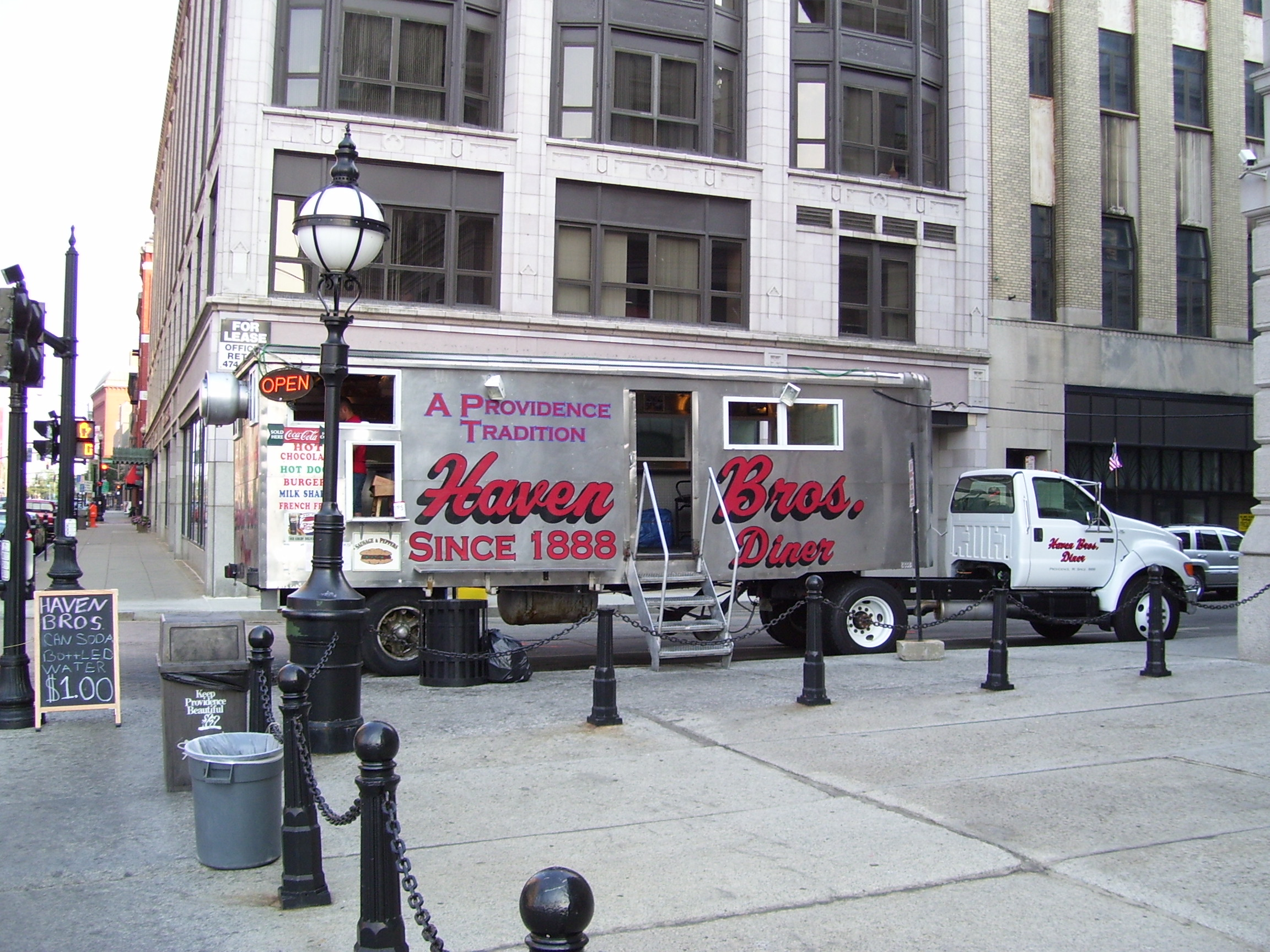
Haven Brothers in 2008

== First food truck ==
Haven Brothers Diner (located next to City Hall during the evenings hours), founded in 1888, is one of the oldest restaurants on wheels in America when it was launched as a horse drawn lunch wagon.

== Neighboring buildings and spaces ==
Clockwise, from the northeast:

- Federal Building (Providence, Rhode Island)
- One Financial Plaza
- 100 Westminster (connected to 30 Kennedy Plaza)
- 50 Kennedy Plaza
- Industrial National Bank Building
- 66–68 Kennedy Plaza
- 70 Kennedy Plaza(People's Savings Bank)
- The Westminster Square Building (10 Dorrance Street)
- Haven Brothers Diner
- Providence City Hall
- Providence Biltmore (11 Dorrance St)
- Bank of America Skating Center (2 Kennedy Plaza)
- Burnside Park, Providence, Rhode Island
- Annex Finance Station Post Office, 2 Exchange Terrace

=== Rehabilitation and historic tax credit projects ===
- In 1975 the Providence Biltmore closed and remained out of use until a group of local businesses implemented Federal tax credits to rehabilitate the building, reopening it in 1979.
- High Rock Development proposed a plan to convert the shell at 111 Westminster Street into mostly luxury apartments, involving $80 million in tax credits from the State. This plan was rejected. The State has applied to move some of their Health and Human Services offices into the now vacant property. High Rock Development has since offered a four-year plan that would invest $40 million of new funding for the rehabilitation of the tower into a dense urban mix of uses that include retail, business and 285 residential units. The former and new financing proposals were met with mixed reaction.
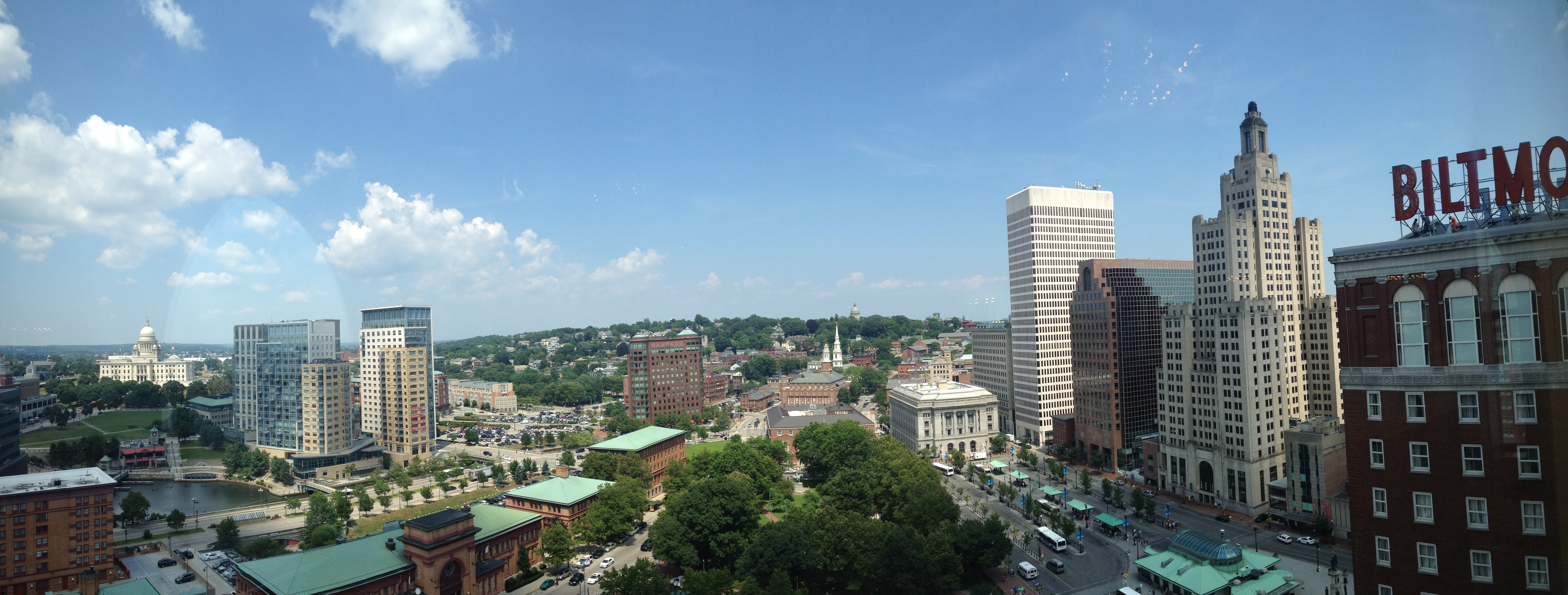
Panoramic view from 18th floor of the Biltmore Hotel
