= Equestrian statue of Ambrose Burnside =

Equestrian statue in Providence, US

Major General Ambrose E. Burnside
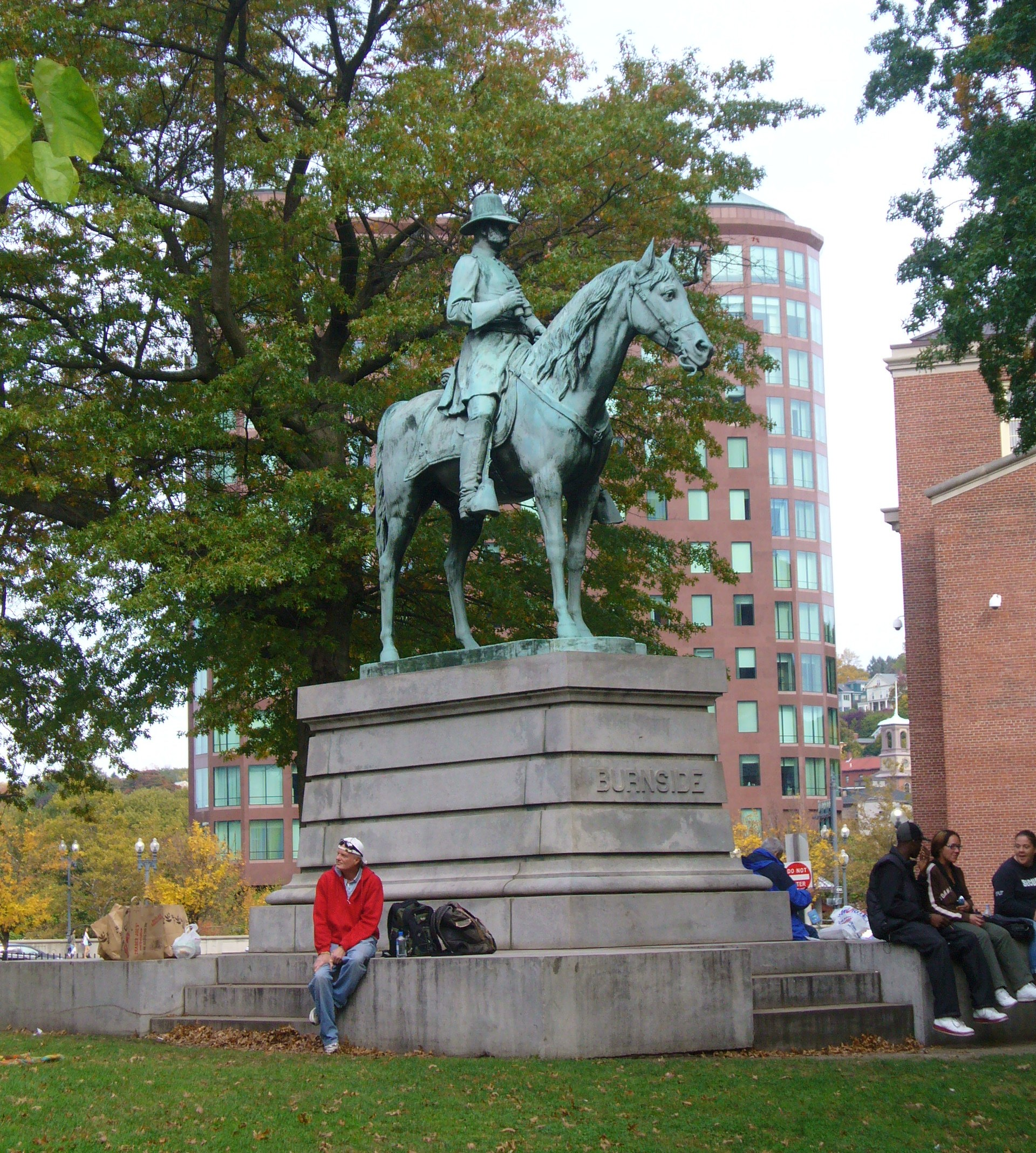
- The statue in 2013
- Location: Burnside Park, Providence, Rhode Island, United States
- Coordinates: 41°49′33″N 71°24′42″W
- Designer: Launt Thompson (statue); William R. Walker (pedestal)
- Fabricator: The Henry-Bonnard Bronze Company (foundry); Henry O. Avery (architect)
- Material: Bronze; Granite
- Length: 18 feet (5.5 m)
- Width: 8 feet (2.4 m)
- Height: Statue: 13.5 feet (4.1 m); Pedestal: 112.5 inches (2.86 m)
- Dedicated date: July 4, 1887
- Dedicated to: Ambrose Burnside

Major General Ambrose E. Burnside, also known as the Ambrose Burnside Monument, is a monumental equestrian statue in Providence, Rhode Island, United States. The statue, located in the city's Burnside Park, was designed by sculptor Launt Thompson and depicts Ambrose Burnside, an officer in the Union Army during the American Civil War who later served as the governor of Rhode Island. Ambrose had died in 1881 and the project to erect a statue in his honor began shortly afterwards. It was dedicated on July 4, 1887 in a large ceremony that included several notable guests of honor, such as General William Tecumseh Sherman, Colonel Robert Hale Ives Goddard, and the governors of both Connecticut and Rhode Island. The monument was originally located in Exchange Place (now known as Kennedy Plaza), but it was moved to its current location in the early 1900s. As part of the move, the pedestal was replaced with one designed by William R. Walker.

== History ==
=== Background ===
Ambrose Burnside was a military officer who served in the United States Army during the mid-1800s. After graduating from the United States Military Academy in 1847, he participated in the Mexican–American War. At the outbreak of the American Civil War, he led the 1st Rhode Island Infantry Regiment of the Union Army and was later promoted to commanding the Army of the Potomac. In the later parts of the war, Burnside was moved to commanding positions in other departments, including the Department of the Ohio and the IX Corps. Following the war, he was elected to several terms as governor of Rhode Island, and afterwards was elected to the U.S. Senate. He died on September 13, 1881. Following this, he lay in state in Providence City Hall.

=== Creation ===
The day after Burnside's death, Colonel Isaac M. Potter suggested erecting a statue in his honor, and less than a week after his funeral, a group of soldiers gathered at the Grand Army of the Republic's Prescott Post Hall in Providence at Potter's request. The result of this meeting was the formation of a General Committee to oversee the monument project, with General Horatio Rogers Jr. as its chairman. This committee then began fundraising, and by January 1883, enough money had been raised that a meeting was held on January 20 where a Building Committee was appointed to select an artist and location in Providence for the monument, which would be an equestrian statue. In May 1883, the Building Committee commissioned sculptor Launt Thompson of New York City to design the monument, which was to be created by May 20, 1886. Thompson would be paid $30,000 for the work, with half to be received at the submission of a plaster model to a bronze foundry and the other half to be received when the statue was placed on a pedestal, which was to be designed by Thompson and provided by the committee. At the time, Thompson was working on another commission, a statue of Admiral Samuel Francis Du Pont in Washington, D.C.

In designing the statue, Thompson bought several horses to use as models and make several changes until a final design was determined. The Burnside monument was Thompson's last major work, as well as the only equestrian statue in his career. According to a preservationist with the Rhode Island Historical Preservation and Heritage Commission, the statue was commissioned during a time they referred to as the "Bronze Age"—the period from the 1870s to the 1920s when many bronze Civil War statues were erected across the country. Work on the Burnside project took longer than expected, and it was not until July 1885 that a sketch of the statue was submitted by Thompson and approved by the committee, and it took until August 1886 that a plaster model was submitted for casting at the Henry-Bonnard Bronze Company in New York City.

Meanwhile, Thompson's pedestal design was accepted by the committee, with some slight modifications from the committee's consulting architect William R. Walker, and created by architect Henry O. Avery of New York City, (Note: The Smithsonian Institution Research Information System states that the pedestal "was designed by Henry O. Avery", while an 1887 program for the dedication ceremony states that the designs were made by Thompson and executed by Avery.) with the location for the monument selected to be Exchange Place (later renamed Kennedy Plaza). Specifically, the statue would be on the eastern end of the plaza. Additional contracting work was done by George Gerhard of East Providence, Rhode Island and Franklin L. Mason of Providence, while the city government added a curbed sidewalk to hinder the possibility of auto accidents with the monument. The marble for the pedestal was acquired from Frederick L. Mathewson's quarry in Burrillville, Rhode Island and was cut and prepared by Providence citizen Isaac M. Sweet. The total cost of the monument (not including the sidewalk installation) was about $40,000, with the government of Rhode Island contributing $10,854.69 of this amount, the city contributing an additional $5,000, and the remainder raised through private donations. By April 1887, it was determined that the monument would be ready for unveiling on July 4 (Independence Day). In preparation for this, the Rhode Island General Assembly appropriated $4,000 towards the dedication ceremony, in addition to $1,000 for transporting veterans to the event and $2,500 for the governor to call upon the militia for the event. This was all in addition to $2,000 set aside by the city council for Independence Day festivities. All veterans living in Rhode Island were invited to attend, with free transportation and food provided. The statue itself was cast and shipped to Providence in June 1887.

=== Dedication ===
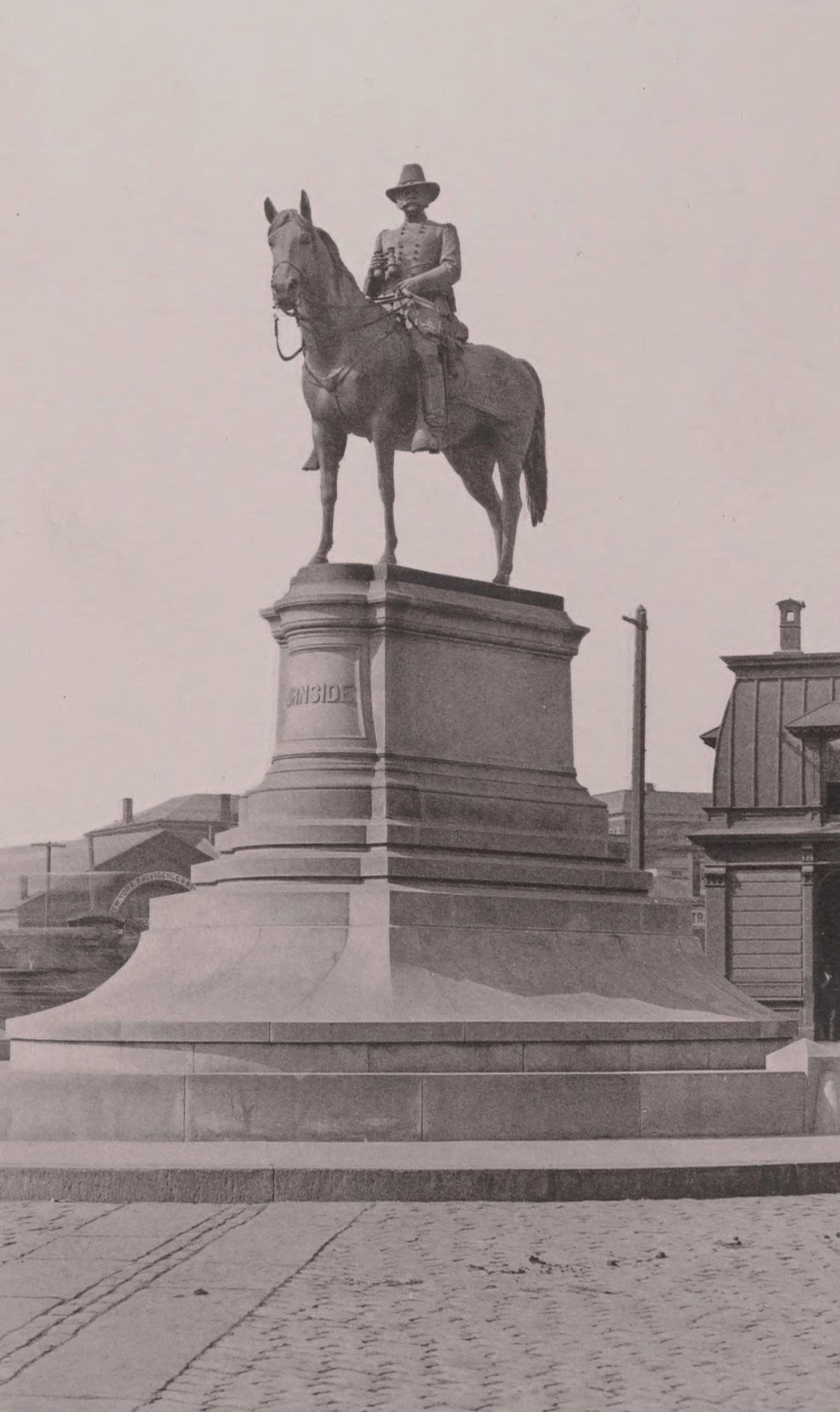
The monument in 1891

The statue was dedicated on July 4, 1887, in a ceremony that began with a procession at 10:30 a.m. The procession included mounted police, the marshals for the event (of which Potter was the chief marshal), the Rhode Island Militia, and many veterans, including members of the Grand Army of the Republic. In total, about 5,000 people marched in the procession, which lasted over an hour. At the end of the procession was a carriage holding Rhode Island Governor John W. Davis and other guests of honor, including General William Tecumseh Sherman and the governor of Connecticut, Phineas C. Lounsbury. "Marching Through Georgia", a Civil War march, was played during the parade to cheers from spectators.

The parade marched through Providence and ended at the monument, where the American Band played an overture before Governor Davis was introduced to the crowd by Henry Rodman Barker. Davis then gave a brief speech before an invocation was given by the Reverend Joseph J. Woolley. General Lewis Richmond then gave a short speech before unveiling the statue, which was accompanied by the American Band playing "The Star-Spangled Banner" as the crowd cheered. General Rogers was then introduced as the ceremony's orator and proceeded to give a lengthy oration in praise of Burnside, recounting some of his experiences in the Civil War and testifying to his character. At the end, Governor Davis introduced Thompson to the crowd and thanked him for his work on the statue, with Thompson giving a one-sentence reply to the crowd that he was proud to have been selected to create the monument and that he hoped it would be satisfactory to the people of Providence and Rhode Island. After this, Colonel Robert Hale Ives Goddard spoke on behalf of the Monument Committee and offered the monument to the city of Providence, with Providence Mayor Gilbert F. Robbins accepting. The ceremony ended with the Reverend Christopher Hughes giving a benediction and the band playing the "American Hymn". Following the close, a large reception was held for the guests of honor and veterans. Additionally, other Independence Day-related festivities occurred throughout Providence for the rest of the day.

=== Later history ===
In December 1902, the Rhode Island General Assembly passed an act to relocate some monuments in Providence, including the Burnside statue. As part of the act, the General Assembly would pay for both the statue's relocation and the creation of a new pedestal. In 1906, (Note: This is the year given by the Smithsonian Institution Research Information System, though a 1957 book on the history of Providence gives the year as 1905.) the statue was moved from Exchange Plaza to the northeast corner of nearby City Hall Park, which would later be known as Burnside Park. The statue was placed on a new pedestal designed by Walker. In 1993, the statue was surveyed as part of the Save Outdoor Sculpture! project. In July 2015, the city of Providence spent $13,500 in hiring Buccacio Sculpture Studios LLC of Natick, Massachusetts to restore the statue as part of a larger renovation of the Kennedy Plaza area.

== Design ==
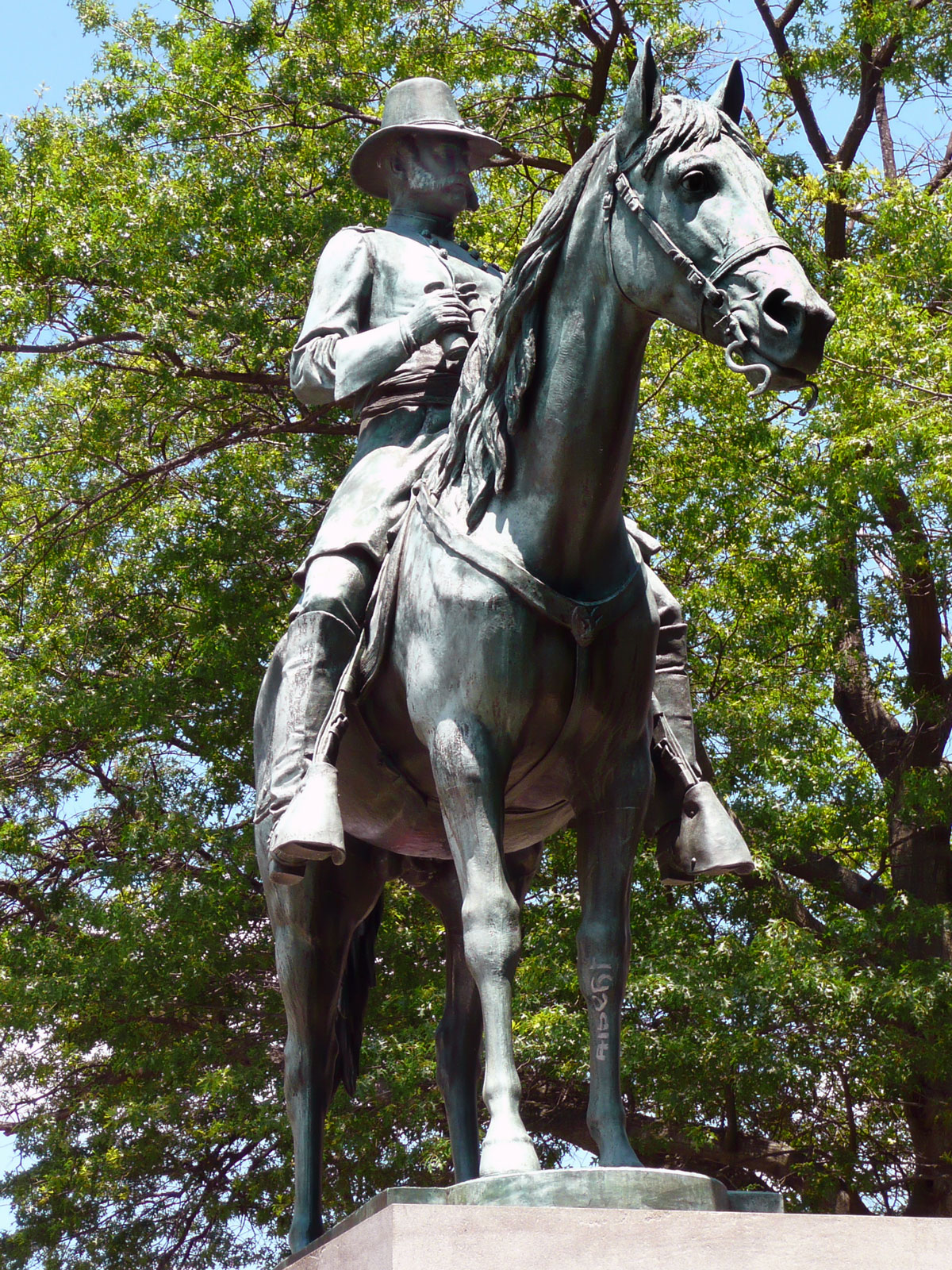
Closeup of the statue

The monument consists of a bronze equestrian statue of Burnside atop a granite pedestal. The statue depicts Burnside overlooking a battlefield, with binoculars in his right hand and the horse's reins in his left. The horse is depicted with all four feet planted on the ground and also staring directly ahead. Burnside is dressed in his Civil War military attire. The statue itself is approximately 13.5 feet (4.1 m) tall, with the horse measuring approximately 8 feet (2.4 m) from the ground to its withers. The total statue is approximately 1.5 times life-size, with Burnside depicted as an approximately 9-foot (2.7 m) tall man. The pedestal is divided into two parts, with the upper portion measuring 86 inches (2.2 m) tall and the lower portion measuring 26.5 inches (0.67 m). The upper pedestal covers a rectangular area of 89 inches (2.3 m) by 14 feet (4.3 m), while the lower part has side measurements of 8 feet (2.4 m) and 18 feet (5.5 m). By comparison, the original pedestal measured roughly 15 feet (4.6 m) or 16 feet (4.9 m) tall, making the total original height of the monument about 31 feet (9.4 m). Today, the total height is roughly 20 feet (6.1 m). The base of the statue bears markings from both the sculptor (Launt Thompson 1887 Sculptor) and the foundry (The Henry-Bonnard Bronze Co. 1887.), while the front of the pedestal bears the inscription "BURNSIDE".

=== Analysis ===
In an 1887 encyclopedia of art, Samuel Greene Wheeler Benjamin stated that the statue was "a work of considerable merit" and compares it favorably to other equestrian statues in the United States, such as Thomas Ball's statue of George Washington in Boston, John Quincy Adams Ward's statue of George Henry Thomas in Washington D.C., and Henry Kirke Brown's statues of Winfield Scott and George Washington in Washington, D.C., and New York City, respectively. However, in the same review, Benjamin stated that while all of those statues were "meritorious works", "none are of the first rank". Meanwhile, an 1891 article in The American Architect & Building News gave the following review: "Considering the character of the sculptor's previous work, this, his only piece of equestrian sculpture, is surprisingly good. It is sober, dignified, well-composed and, though the modelling is commonplace and hardly bears examination, the whole monument is deserving of a much better site than has been accorded it, for it is pushed aside to one end of an irregular-shaped square near the railroad station, where it is hemmed about by cars, carriages and wagons; but the squalor and bustle of its surroundings do but enhance and make conspicuous the virtues of a quiescent pose in a public statue." A 1965 catalogue from the Metropolitan Museum of Art states that many of Thompson's Civil War-related statuary, including the Burnside statue, were designed "in the heavy-handed, cast-iron, realistic style that prevailed between 1865 and 1895."

== See also ==
- List of equestrian statues in the United States
- List of Union Civil War monuments and memorials

== Sources ==
- "Statues of President Garfield and General Burnside". The American Architect and Building News. XIV (395). Boston: James R. Osgood & Co.: 26. July 21, 1883.
- "Equestrian Monuments – XLIII". The American Architect and Building News. XXXIV (827). Boston: Ticknor & Company: 65–70. October 31, 1891.
- Beath, Robert B. (1889). History of the Grand Army of the Republic. With an Introduction by General Lucius Fairchild. New York City: Bryan, Taylor & Co. ISBN 978-1-2975-8076-5.
- Benjamin, S. G. W. (1887). "Part III. Modern Art". The Iconographic Encyclopedia. Vol. III. Based on the German of Dr. Moritz Carrière. Philadelphia: Iconographic Publishing Co. pp. 133–286. OCLC 365716150.
- Cady, John Hutchins (1957). The Civic and Architectural Development of Providence. Providence, Rhode Island: Akerman Standard Press. ISBN 978-0-8328-7030-9.
- Dedication of the Equestrian Statue of Major-General Ambrose E. Burnside, in the City of Providence, July 4, 1887, with the Oration of General Horatio Rogers. Providence, Rhode Island: E. L. Freeman & Son. 1887. OCLC 12239565.
- Gardner, Albert Ten Eyck (1965). American Sculpture: A Catalogue of the Collection of the Metropolitan Museum of Art. New York City: Metropolitan Museum of Art. ISBN 978-0-3001-9297-1.
- Heintze, James R. (2007). The Fourth of July Encyclopedia. Jefferson, North Carolina: McFarland & Company. ISBN 978-1-4766-0855-6.
- Hill, John (August 3, 2015). "Refurbished statue of Gen. Burnside is ready for inspection in Providence". The Providence Journal. GateHouse Media. Archived from the original on December 30, 2019.
- "The Burnside Statue Project". The New York Times. January 21, 1883. ISSN 0362-4331. Archived from the original on October 25, 2021.
- "The Burnside Statue". The New York Times. June 26, 1887. ISSN 0362-4331. Archived from the original on October 25, 2021.
- Public Laws of the State of Rhode Island and Providence Plantations, Passed at the Sessions of the General Assembly, 1904 and 1905. Office of the Secretary of State. Providence, Rhode Island: E. L. Freeman & Sons. 1905.
- Quinby, Florence Cole (1913). The Equestrian Monuments of the World. New York City. ISBN 978-1-1650-7987-2.
- "Major General Ambrose E. Burnside, (sculpture)". Smithsonian Institution Research Information System. Archived from the original on October 25, 2021.
- Southworth, Alvan S. (February 1888). "The Sculptors of New York". Frank Leslie's Popular Monthly. XXV (2): 132–143.
