= Occupy Providence =

- Part of the "Occupy" protests
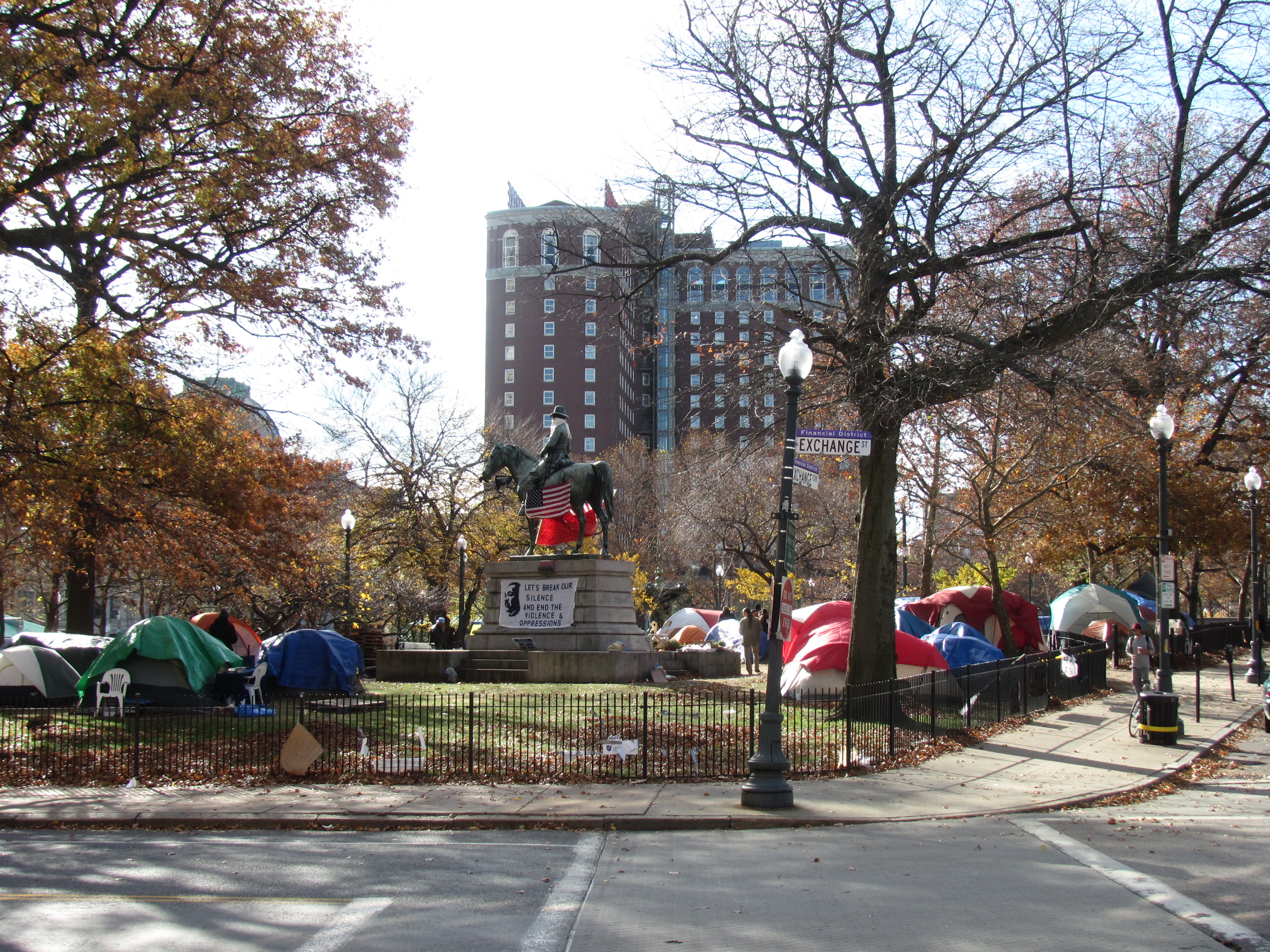
- Demonstrators camping at Burnside Park, 19 November 2011
- Date: 15 October 2011 – 24 January 2012
- Location: Providence, Rhode Island, United States
- Caused by: Economic inequality, corporate influence over government, inter alia.
- Methods: Demonstration, occupation, protest, street protesters
- Status: Ended Jan, 2012

Arrests and injuries
- Injuries: 4 (Fights)

Occupy Providence began on Saturday October 15, 2011. According to the Boston Globe, well over 1,000 demonstrators, including children and adults of various ages, peacefully marched through the capital city before setting up camp at Burnside Park in downtown Providence, RI and turning the park into a 24 hour protest. The march made its way through the streets of downtown Providence, pausing outside such institutions as Bank of America, Providence Place Mall, and the Rhode Island State House.

Finally, in January 2012, Occupy Providence agreed to suspend its 24-hour-a-day protest.

Occupy Providence participants continued to engage in organized meetings, events and actions in Burnside Park in 2012, 2015, and 2016, although many fewer people attended these than the original Occupy Providence events.

== Background and aims ==
Occupy Providence is one of over 4000 "Occupy" protests across the globe to be inspired by Occupy Wall Street (which began in New York City on September 17, 2011). According to the official Statement of Purpose as published on the Occupy Providence website on October 24, 2011, participants seek socioeconomic change "by means of a truly democratic General Assembly." The "Occupy" protests are concerned with furnishing an alternative to corporate and lobbyist-driven politics and with building "a society by, for, and of the people." Occupy Providence is "non-violent, non-destructive, non-discriminatory and harassment-free" and prohibits all drugs and alcohol from the site of the occupation.

== Cooperation with City officials ==
Though a group of protestors met with Providence's Public Safety Commissioner Steven Pare and other city officials on Thursday October 13, 2011, they decided to decline a city permit to inhabit Burnside Park. More than 100 tents were erected within the first week of Occupy Providence, despite some verbal pressure from city officials for a definitive exit timeline.

At the outset of the demonstration, city officials showed cooperation with the Occupy participants as police cleared traffic for the October 15th march and General Assembly. No arrests or acts of violence have been reported to date.

On October 24, 2011 Occupy Providence activists staged a public reading of a letter to Providence Mayor Angel Taveras. The letter, made audible using the human microphone system, thanked the Mayor for his cooperation thus far and requested that the protest be allowed to carry on in Burnside Park.

Many Occupy Providence participants that were interviewed by the press stated no intention of leaving the park, while others considered moving to another location. On October 26, 2011 The Boston Globe reported Steven Pare's announcement that the city will consider taking legal action if protestors refuse to end the encampment. Pare cited concern for public health and safety and an ordinance prohibiting use of public parks past 9 PM as grounds for action.

== See also ==
Occupy articles

- List of global Occupy protest locations
- Occupy movement
- Timeline of Occupy Wall Street
- We are the 99%

Related articles

- Arab Spring
- Economic inequality
- Grassroots movement
- Income inequality in the United States
- Plutocracy
- Tea Party protests
- Wealth inequality in the United States
