= Samuel Greene Wheeler Benjamin =

American artist and diplomat (1837-1914

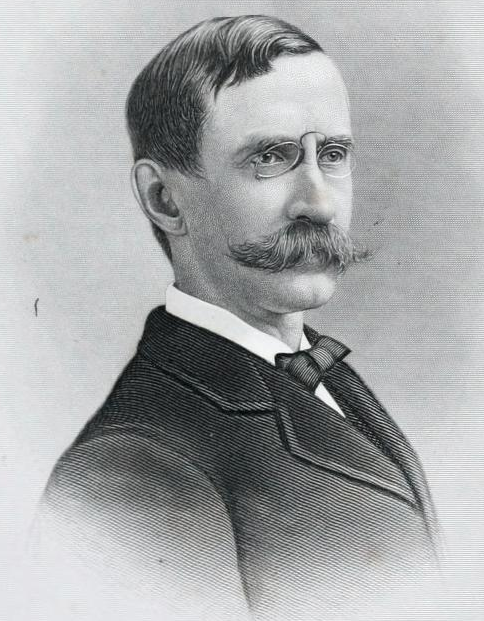
Portrait of S.G.W. Benjamin, 1887

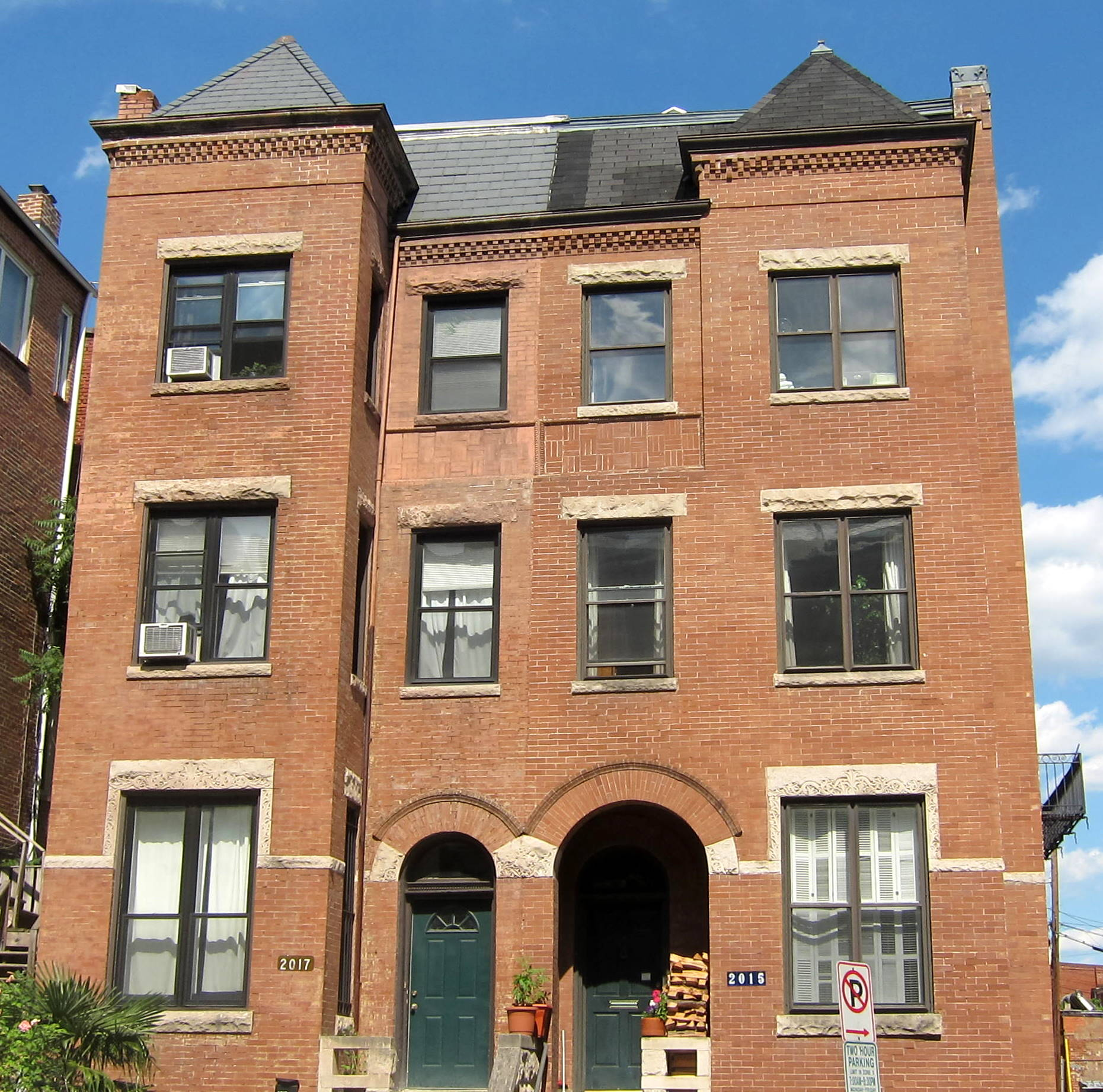
Benjamin's former residence (right) in Washington, D.C.

Samuel Greene Wheeler "S.G.W." Benjamin (February 13, 1837 – July 19, 1914) was an American journalist, author, artist, and diplomat.

He was born in Argos, Greece, one of five children of Reverend Nathan Benjamin and Mary Glading Wheeler Benjamin, American missionaries in Greece. Benjamin was educated in the United States, receiving an A.B. from Williams College in 1859.

== American Minister to Persia ==
Prior to his ascendancy to ministership, Benjamin had been appointed as the Chargé d'Affaires to Persia but did not proceed to this post. In 1883, he was appointed as the first American Minister to Persia (modern-day Iran). Arriving at the port city of Rasht, cannon fire, elegant banquets, and many gifts were presented to Benjamin and his family. However, while at the palace of the provincial governor, Benjamin received a message that the Shah would be departing Tehran for the summer holiday and that no foreign envoys were allowed into Tehran without the Shah's presence. Traveling two hundred miles in only two days, Benjamin arrived at Tehran's gates with the escort of nearly a thousand royal guards. Having finally his audience with the Persian monarch, Benjamin read a speech penned by the American president Chester A Arthur.

Despite being in the capital city, Benjamin remained houseless. In the year prior, 1882, The State Department had only approved a $5000 salary with an additional $3000 for travel related expenses. On top of the meager salary the State Department did not purchase office space for the new American legation. The inadequacy of what was provided to him vexed Benjamin whose irascible and bombastic personality often made diplomacy a matter of competition between him and other European diplomats. In fact, within his first day of arriving in Tehran Benjamin purchased a hundred-foot flagpole so as to most proudly fly the American flag.

Despite his contentious relationships with the German, British, Russian diplomatic ranks, Benjamin cared for and deeply respected his Persian hosts, culture, and religion. His unfettered commitment to an amicable U.S. – Persian relationship were also partially motivated by acting to counterbalance European control in Persia.

Benjamin witnessed the success of European investment in Persia and encouraged American investment as well, but with an isolationist foreign policy, American businesses would have to take all the risk without their government's support. In 1885, with the election of Grover Cleveland, a Democrat, Benjamin left his post in Tehran. In 1886, he wrote a popular book called Persia and the Persians, the first widely circulated book on Persian culture for the greater American audience. It was he who first drafted the diplomatic code used by the American legation in Persia.

== Later life ==
As a journalist, Benjamin served as American art editor for the Magazine of Art and covered the Crimean War with the London Illustrated News. He was also a marine painter and illustrator.

Benjamin wrote poetry and books on Persia, Greece, Turkey, and American and European art. In his autobiography, "The Life and Adventures of a Free Lance," Benjamin commented on his friendships with artists in New York including William Holbrook Beard, Frederic Edwin Church, Sanford R. Gifford, and Launt Thompson. Benjamin died in Burlington, Vermont in 1914, aged 77.

== See also ==
- US-Iran relations

== Sources ==
- Lorentz, J.: Historical Dictionary of Iran, 1995; ISBN 0-8108-2994-0
- Olsen, T.: S. G. W. Benjamin, Thomson-Gale 2005/06. Accessed 2007-02-20.
- Benjamin, Samuel Greene Wheeler, politicalgraveyard.com. Accessed 2007-02-20.
