= Haven Brothers Diner =

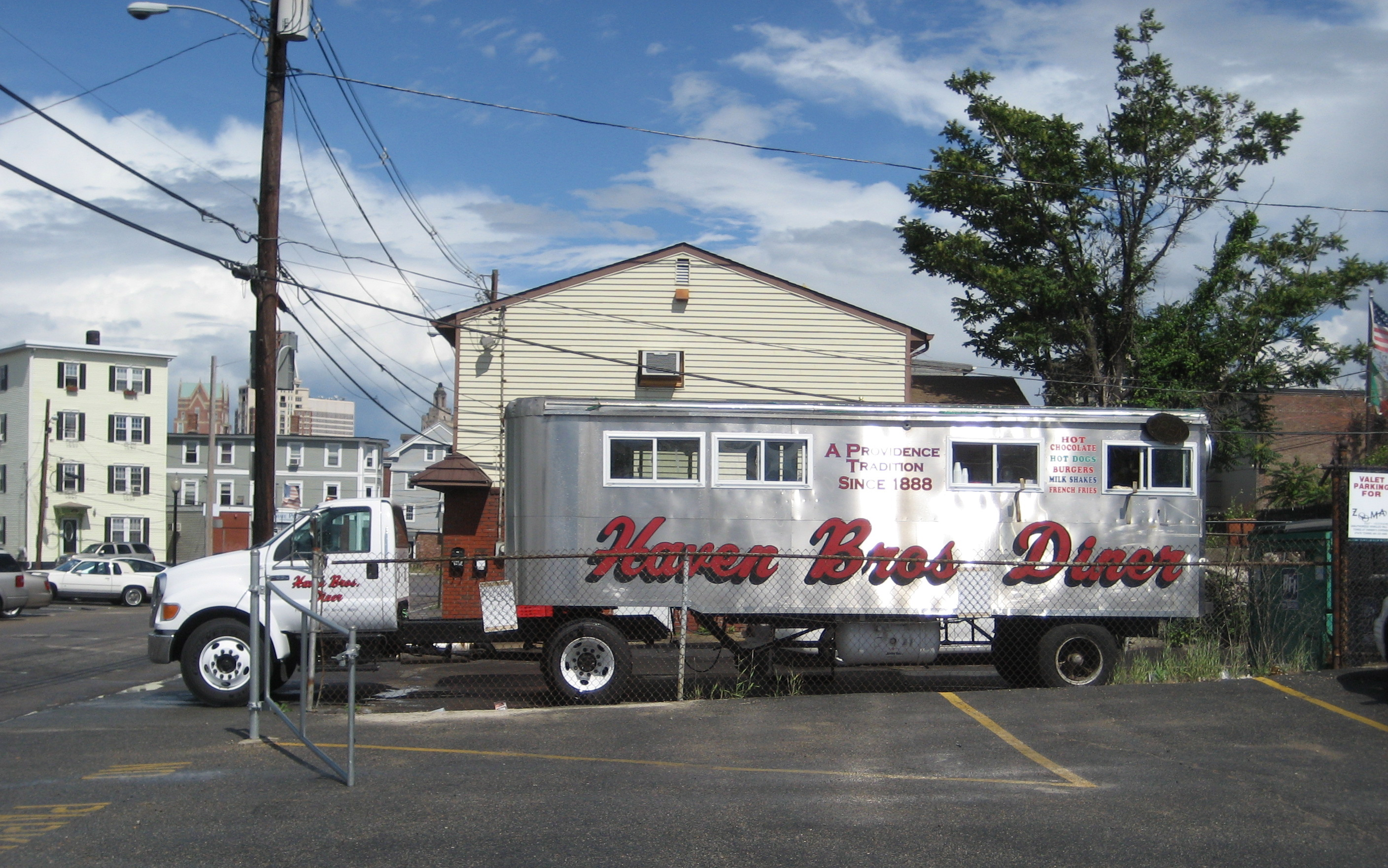
Haven Brothers in Federal Hill

Haven Brothers Diner in Providence, Rhode Island is one of the oldest restaurants on wheels in America and was founded in 1893 as a horse-drawn lunch wagon.

== History ==
In 1888, Widowed immigrant Anne Philomena Haven (1842—1912) founded the diner business with the proceeds from her husband Patrick's life insurance policy. The "lunch cart" (as the family called it) was purchased in Worcester, Massachusetts, originally a horse-drawn wagon. Her daughter Catherine Gannon and Catherine's husband Dennis Gannon continued to run the diner with the help of their young sons William and John. Dennis continued to run the business until he sold it to his daughters Catherine, Anne, Tibertus, and Marian. The Haven family finally sold the business in 1953 to the Mollicone family, and later owners included Jack Ferry, and the Giusti family. Every evening at 4:30, the proprietor wheels the 1949 Fred W. Morse diner car (the third wagon in the diner's history) to the corner of Dorrance and Fulton streets next to the Providence City Hall and Kennedy Plaza. After it closes, the diner is wheeled away to Federal Hill.

Once in its history, Haven Brothers set up shop in a location far from Providence. On April 9, 2008, the diner was brought to Mid-town Manhattan and parked outside the NBC Studios at 30 Rockefeller Plaza for the Today Show. Hosts Meredith Vieira and Matt Lauer had both worked at the NBC 10 studios in Providence, two blocks from Haven Brothers time-honored location beside Providence City Hall; each had chosen it as their favorite old-time diner.

In 2011, the diner was featured on the Travel Channel's Man v. Food Nation, hosted by Adam Richman.
