= Burnside Park (Providence, Rhode Island) =

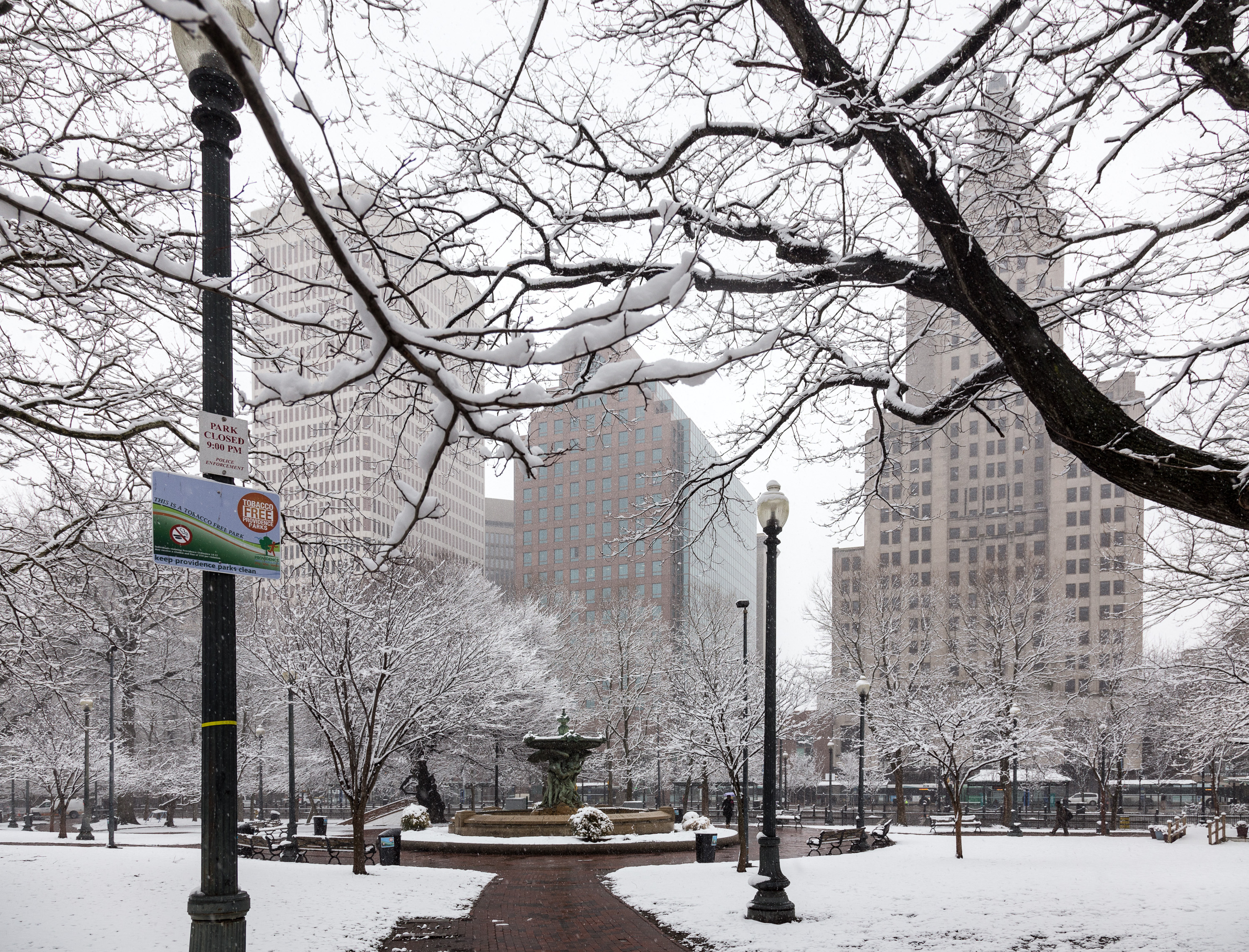
- Burnside park on a snowy day
- Interactive map of Burnside Park
- Location: Providence, Rhode Island
- Coordinates: 41.8248224°N 71.4111676°W

Burnside Park is a small park situated in Downtown Providence, Rhode Island, adjacent to Kennedy Plaza. The park is named for Ambrose Burnside, a general in the American Civil War from Rhode Island. An equestrian statue of Ambrose Burnside was erected in the late 19th century and sits in the center of the park.

== History ==
"Burnside Park" was originally known as City Hall Park. Some of the current park is located on the land that was formerly part of the Cove Basin. The rest was purchased from the Old Colony Railroad Company and the New York and New England Railroad Companies. The park was dedicated in 1892 and landscaped following the completion of Union Station in 1898. Monumental sculpture was added in the first decade of the 20th century, including the resetting of the equestrian portrait of General Ambrose E. Burnside (1887, Launt Thompson, sculptor) from Exchange Place in 1906.

Burnside Park was the location of the camp of the Occupy Providence Movement (patterned after the Occupy Wall Street movement in New York City) during the Fall of 2011.

== Artworks ==
=== Bajnotti Fountain ===
The centerpiece of the park is the Bajnotti Fountain, sculpted in 1902 by Enid Yandell. At the time of its erection, it was referred to as the Carrie Brown Memorial Fountain. The fountain was a gift to the City of Providence by Italian Diplomat Signor Paul Bajnotti. It was commissioned as a memorial to Bajnotti's wife, Carrie Mathilde Brown, daughter of Nicholas Brown III, for whom the Carrie Tower is also named.

=== Burnside Statue ===
A 20-foot tall bronze statue by Irish-American sculptor Launt Thompson depicts Rhode Island Governor, Senator, and Civil War general Ambrose Burnside on horseback. A public campaign raised $30,000 to build a statue in Burnside's honor. The statue was unveiled July 4, 1887. It was restored in early 2015, as part of an overall upgrade to the downtown Kennedy Plaza area.

== Gallery ==
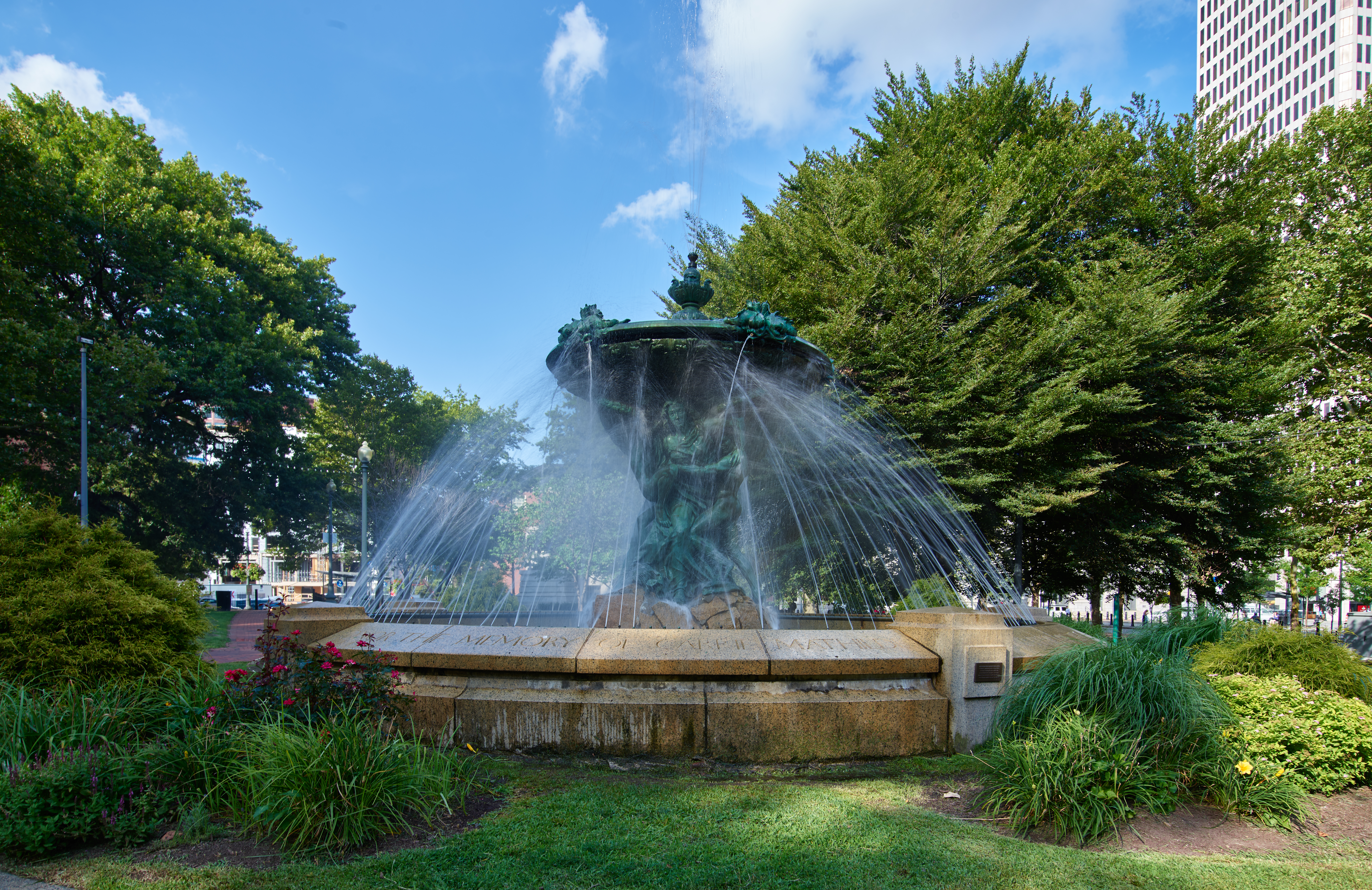
Bajnotti Fountain (1902), Enid Yandell

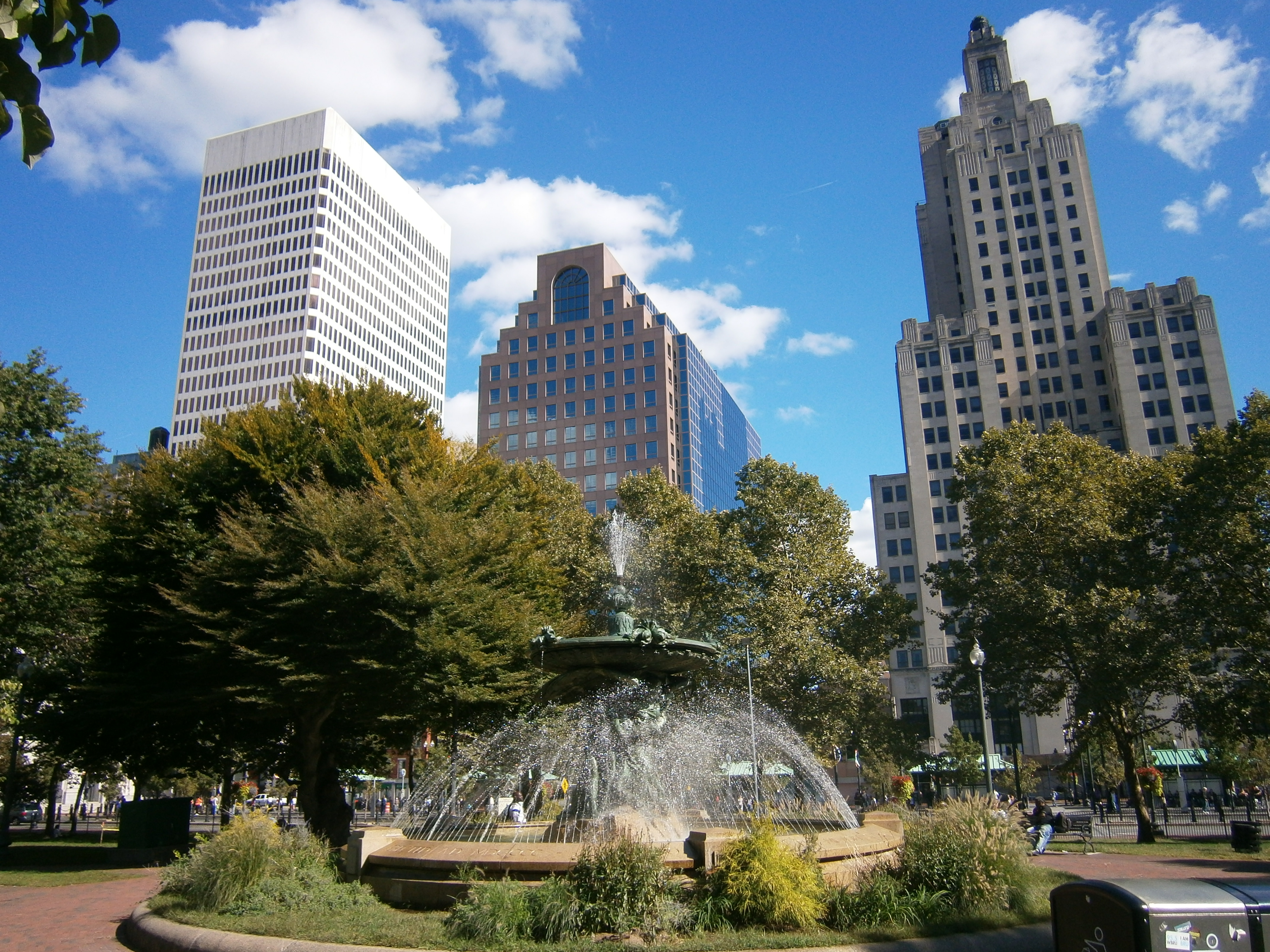
View of the Providence skyline from the park.

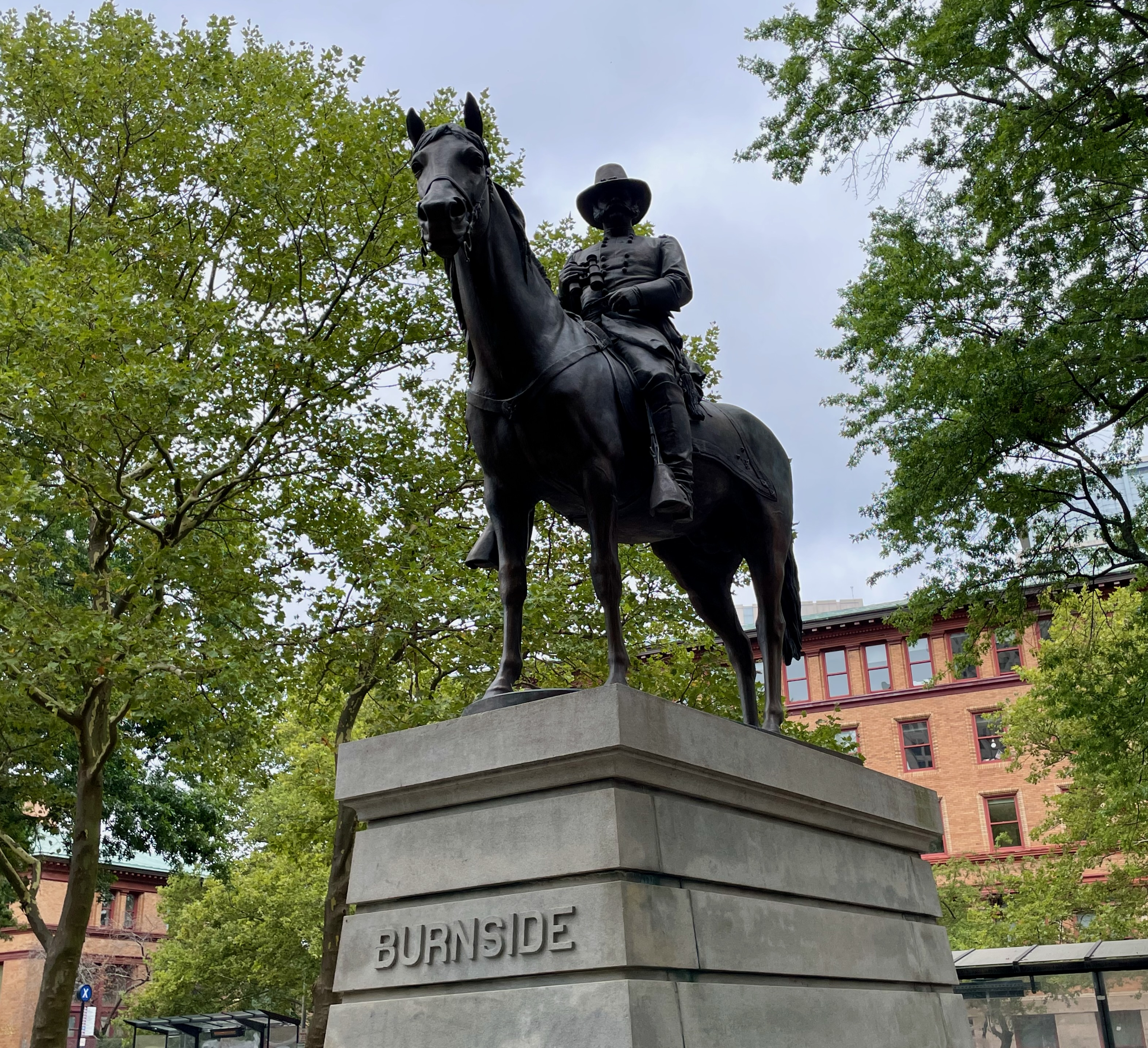
Burnside Statue (1887), Launt Thompson
