= Launt Thompson =

American sculptor (1833–1894)

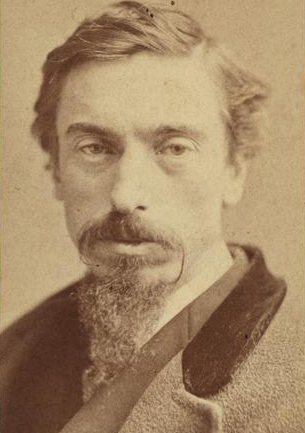
- Born: February 8, 1833; Abbeyleix, Ireland
- Died: September 26, 1894 (aged 61)
- Known for: sculpture

Launt Thompson (February 8, 1833 – September 26, 1894) was an American sculptor.

== Biography ==
He was born in Abbeyleix, Ireland. Due to the Great Famine occurring in Ireland at the time, he emigrated to the United States in 1847 with his widowed mother, and they settled in Albany, New York. There, he found work as a handyman.

After studying anatomy in the office of a physician, Dr. James H. Armsby, he spent nine years as the studio boy of the sculptor, E. D. Palmer. In 1858 he moved to New York City where he opened a studio. There he shared an apartment with James Pinchot. In 1862 he was elected academician at the National Academy due to his work Rocky Mountain Trapper, a marble portrait of James "Grizzly" Adams. He visited Rome in 1868–1869, and married Maria Louisa Potter (1839–1916), daughter of Alonzo Potter, Episcopal Bishop of Pennsylvania. From 1875 to 1887 he was again in Italy, living for most of the time at Florence. He died at the State Mental Asylum at Middletown, New York.

== Selected works ==
- Rocky Mountain Trapper (1862), unlocated.
- Napoleon the First (1866), Smithsonian American Art Museum, Washington, D.C.
- Portrait bust of William Cullen Bryant (1867), Metropolitan Museum of Art, New York City.
- General John Sedgwick Monument (1868), United States Military Academy, West Point, New York.
- Portrait bust of Charles Loring Elliott (1870), Metropolitan Museum of Art, New York City.
- Portrait bust of Sanford Gifford (1871), Metropolitan Museum of Art, New York City.
- Civil War Memorial (1872), Park Square, Pittsfield, Massachusetts.
- General Winfield Scott (1873), Soldiers' Home, Washington, D.C.
- Abraham Pierson, First President of Yale College (1874), Yale University, New Haven, Connecticut. A replica is in Clinton, Connecticut.
- Unconsciousness (1881), Marble nude. Roswell P. Flower Memorial Library, Watertown, N.Y.
- United States Regulars Monument (1882), Stones River National Battlefield, Murfreesboro, Tennessee.
- Admiral Samuel Francis Du Pont (1884), Rockford Park, Wilmington, Delaware. Originally installed at DuPont Circle in Washington D.C.; moved to Wilmington, 1920.
- Equestrian statue of Ambrose Burnside (1887), Burnside Park, Providence, Rhode Island. This was Thompson's only equestrian statue and last major work.
- Medallion portrait of General John A. Dix.
- Portrait bust of James Gordon Bennett.
- Portrait bust of Samuel F. B. Morse, National Academy of Design, New York City.
- Portrait bust of Edwin Booth as Hamlet.
- Portrait bust of Stephen H. Tyng
- Portrait bust of Robert B. Minturn.
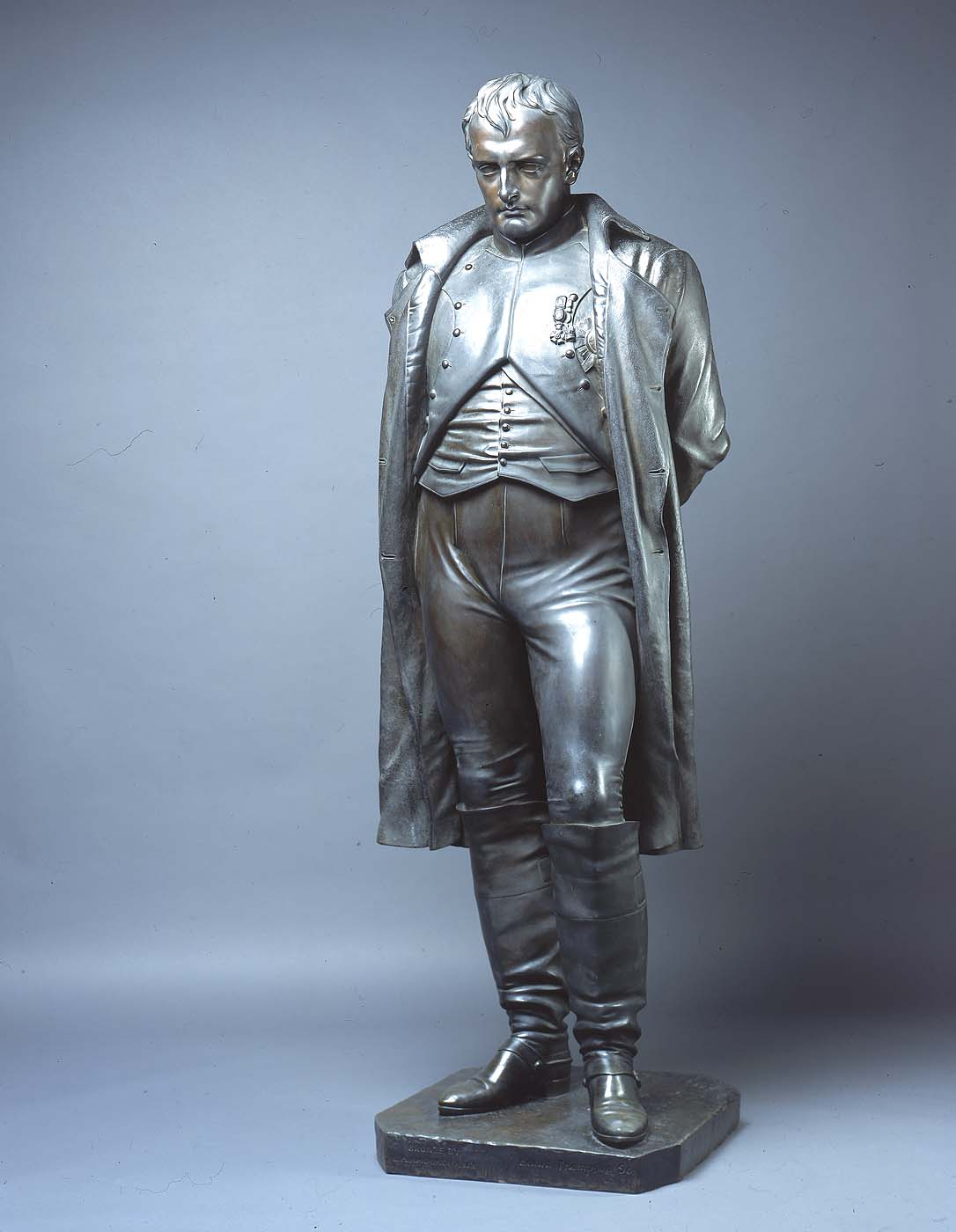
Napoleon I (1866), Smithsonian American Art Museum, Washington, D.C.

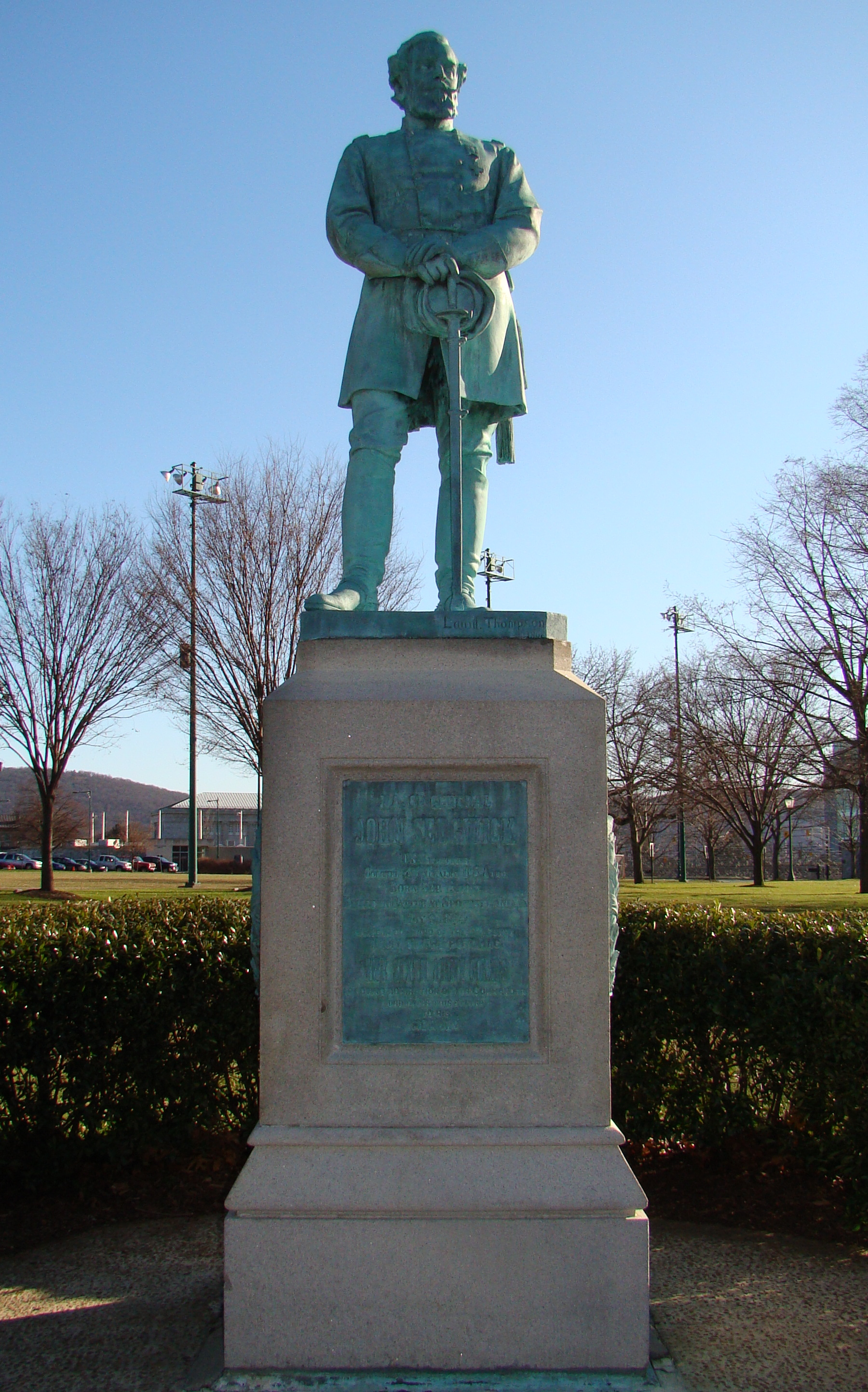
John Sedgwick Monument (1868), United States Military Academy, West Point, New York.

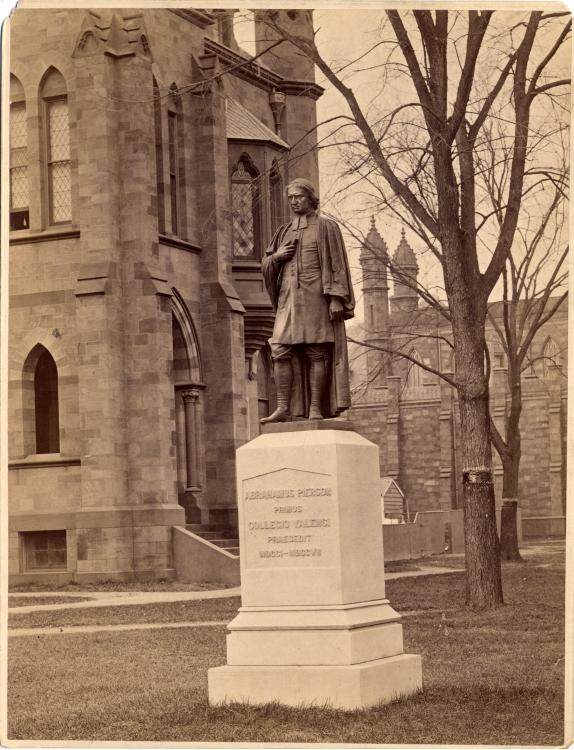
Abraham Pierson (1874), Yale University, New Haven, Connecticut.

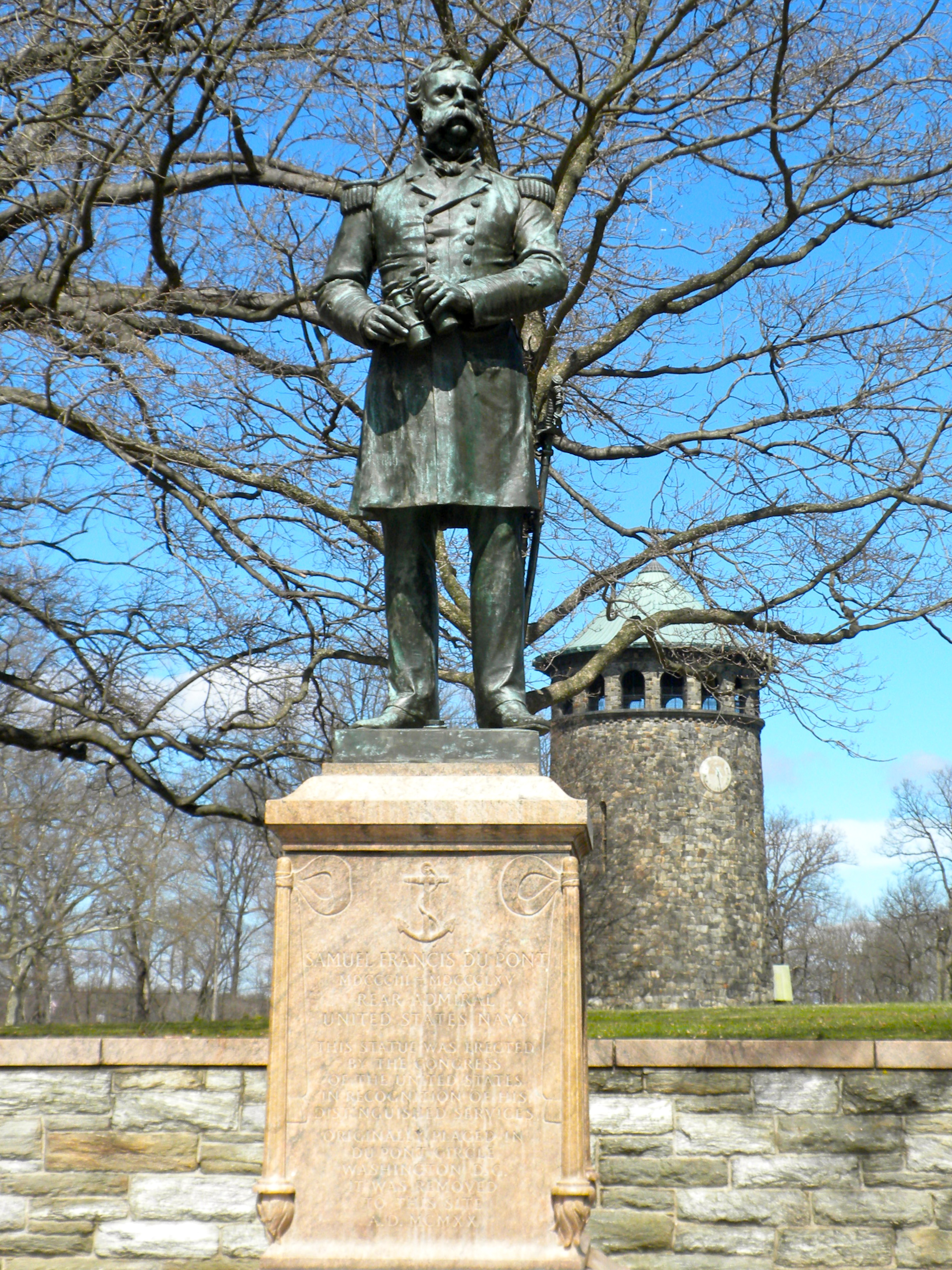
Admiral Samuel Francis Du Pont (1884), Rockford Park, Wilmington, Delaware.

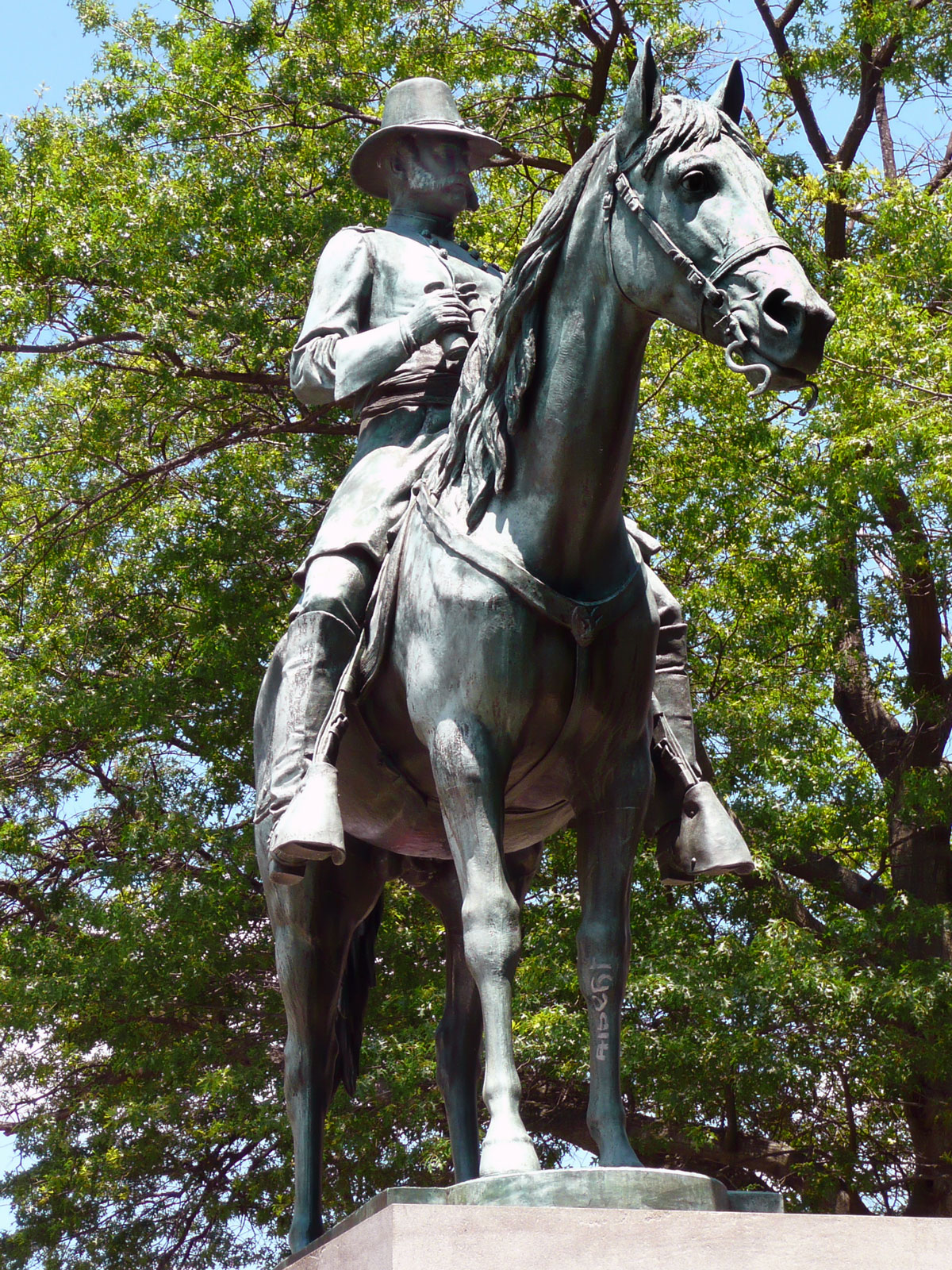
Major-General Ambrose E. Burnside (1887), Burnside Park, Providence, Rhode Island.
