= Jackson, Robertson & Adams =

American architectural firm based in Rhode Island, USA

Practice information
- Partners: F. Ellis Jackson; Wayland T. Robertson; J. Howard Adams; George Fraser; Raymond J. Henthorne
- Founders: F. Ellis Jackson; Wayland T. Robertson; J. Howard Adams
- Founded: 1912
- Dissolved: 1956
- Location: Providence, Rhode Island

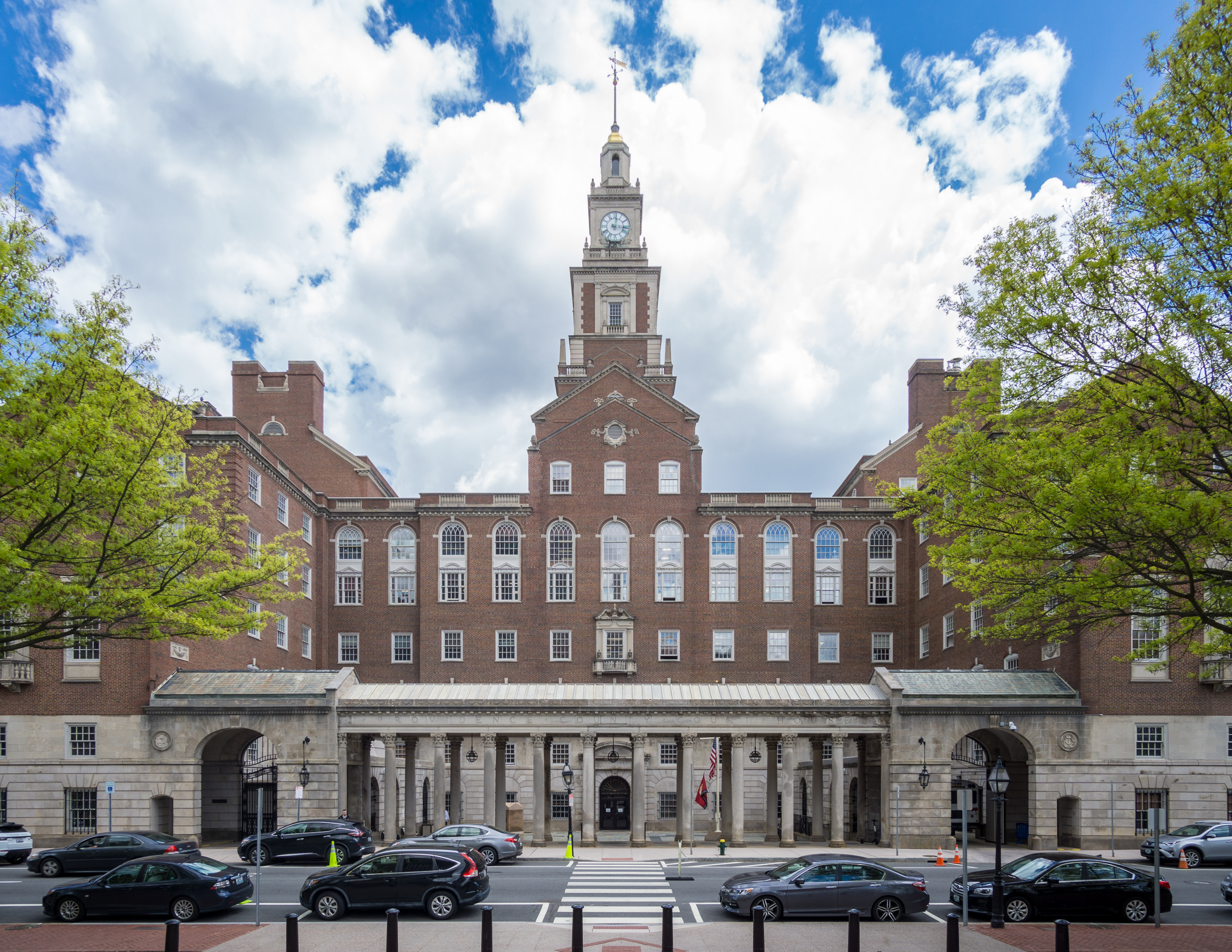
The Providence County Courthouse in Providence, Rhode Island, designed by Jackson, Robertson & Adams in 1924 and completed in 1933.

Jackson, Robertson & Adams was an architectural firm out of Providence, Rhode Island. Established in 1912, it was originally made up of architects F. Ellis Jackson (1879–1950), Wayland T. Robertson (1873–1935), and J. Howard Adams (1876–1924).

== Firm history ==
Prior to founding this firm, Jackson worked with Providence architect Howard K. Hilton. He was promoted to partner in 1902, renaming the firm Hilton & Jackson. Between 1902 and 1905, Hilton and Jackson designed and oversaw the construction of numerous distinguished Colonial Revival homes in Providence that drew upon early Rhode Island architecture while introducing new concepts and styles sweeping the architectural and artistic worlds. Jackson took a leave of absence in 1905 to study at the École Nationale Supérieure des Beaux-Arts in the atelier of Eugene Joseph Armand Duquesne who won the prestigious French scholarship the Grand Prix de Rome in 1897. Jackson returned to the United States in 1909 with his diploma. Hilton died less than a month after Jackson's return. Jackson continued on alone under the Hilton & Jackson name. In 1911, Jackson formed the firm of Jackson & Robertson with Wayland T. Robertson. The next year, they added J. Howard Adams to make Jackson, Robertson & Adams. Both Robertson and Adams had had private practice prior to becoming members of the firm.

The firm designed numerous Colonial Revival buildings around the state which still rank among Rhode Island's best architecture. Under F. Ellis Jackson's leadership, the firm continued its commitment to designing distinct residences but was remarkably prolific in contributing to Rhode Island's civic and commercial architecture legacy. Beginning in the 1930s, Jackson, Robertson & Adams became one of the few architects in the state to work in the Art Deco style.

F. Ellis Jackson died abruptly on February 9, 1950. The Jackson, Robertson & Adams name was retained until 1956, when the then two partners, George Fraser and Raymond J. Henthorne, renamed it Fraser & Henthorne. This firm was dissolved in 1961.

== Works of Jackson, Robertson & Adams ==
Civic and Commercial Buildings in Providence, Rhode Island:

- Franklin Street Fire Station, 33 Franklin St., Providence, RI (1914) - Demolished.
- Remodeling, Providence City Hall, 25 Dorrance St., Providence, RI (1914)
- Central Baptist Church, 372 Wayland Ave., Providence, RI (1915) - Now the Community Church of Providence.
- Gloria Dei Evangelical Lutheran Church, 15 Hayes St., Providence, RI (1916) - Replaced by a new church by Martin Hedmark in 1925.
- Murray S. Danforth Medical Office, 402 Angell St., Providence, RI (1916)
- General Fire Extinguisher Co. Office Building, 260 W. Exchange St., Providence, RI (1919)
- Victory Arch, Kennedy Plaza., Providence, RI (1919) - A temporary structure built to celebrate the end of World War I.
- Remodeling of Joseph Brown House for Counting House Corporation, 50 S. Main St., Providence, RI (1920) - Includes an extensive rear addition visible from Hopkins Street.
- 556 Westminster Street, 556 Westminster St., Providence, RI (1922) - An office building at Cathedral Square, now demolished.
- Providence County Courthouse, 250 Benefit St., Providence, RI (1924)
- Morris Plan Bank Building, 25 Canal St., Providence, RI (1926)
- Nurses' Home, Rhode Island Homeopathic Hospital, 825 Chalkstone Ave., Providence, RI (1927)
- Phenix National Bank Building, 89 Westminster St., Providence, RI (1927) - Among the buildings demolished for 50 Kennedy Plaza.
- Rhode Island State Office Building, 133 Smith St., Providence, RI (1927)
- Church School Wing, Stimson Ave., Central Congregational Church, Providence, RI (1931)
- Rhode Island Hospital Trust Co. Branch, 1 Olneyville Sq., Providence, RI (1931)
- College Building, 2 College St., Rhode Island School of Design, Providence, RI (1936)
- St. Paul's Evangelical Lutheran Church, 445 Elmwood Ave., Providence, RI (1938)
- U. S. Post Office Annex, 1 Exchange Ter., Providence, RI (1939)
- Henry Bowen Anthony Fountain, Lippitt Memorial Park, 1059 Hope St., Providence, RI (1940)
- Industrial Trust Co. Branch, 582 Elmwood Ave., Providence, RI (1947)
- Brook Street Fire Station, 223 Brook St., Providence, RI (1950)
- North Main Street Fire Station, 151 N. Main St., Providence, RI (1952)

Private Residences in Providence, Rhode Island

- Beresford-Nicholson House, 288 Blackstone Blvd., Providence, RI (1910–12, 1919)
- Alice W. Adams House, 57 Barnes St., Providence, RI (1912)
- Charles O. Read House, 123 Blackstone Blvd., Providence, RI (1914)
- John P. Farnsworth House, 104 Prospect St., Providence, RI (1914)
- Benjamin P. Moulton House, 50 Channing Ave., Providence, RI (1915)
- Charles Grossman House, 72 Barnes St., Providence, RI (1915)
- George H. Cahoone House, 360 Olney St., Providence, RI (1915)
- J. Howard Adams House, 64 E. Orchard Ave., Providence, RI (1916) - Home of the architect.
- James W. Thornley House, 2 Freeman Pkwy., Providence, RI (1916)
- John S. Holbrook House, 106 Prospect St., Providence, RI (1916)
- Mary L. Hartwell House, 16 Freeman Pkwy., Providence, RI (1917)
- David P. Moulton House, 75 E. Orchard Ave., Providence, RI (1922)
- Remodeling of the Nightingale-Brown House for John Nicholas Brown II, 357 Benefit St., Providence, RI (1922)
- Benjamin Brier House, 15 Upton Ave., Providence, RI (1924)
- Wayland W. Rice House, 15 Taber Ave., Providence, RI (1924-1925)
- Frederick W. Tillinghast House, 39 E. Orchard Ave., Providence, RI (1925)
- Jeanette B. Huntoon House, 63 Manning St., Providence, RI (1925)
- Lucy P. Kelley House, 25 Orchard Ave., Providence, RI (1925)
- Richard A. Hurley House, 103 Alumni Ave., Providence, RI (1916)
- James P. Murphy House, 57 Boylston Ave., Providence, RI (1917)
- Mary G. Chapin House, 170 Everett Ave., Providence, RI (1917)
- Carrie M. Sutcliffe House, 120 Laurel Ave., Providence, RI (1918)
- Shubael B. Howes House, 450 Wayland Ave., Providence, RI (1920) - Architect Wayland T. Robertson was the first occupant.
- Charles M. Smith III House, 295 Laurel Ave., Providence, RI (1933)

Civic, Commercial and Residential Buildings Elsewhere In Rhode Island:

- Hope Co. Houses, 1-3, 2-4 Brown St., 7-9, 11-13 Goddard St., Hope, RI (1916)
- Hope Co. Overseers' House, 66-68 Main St., Hope, RI (1917)
- Lonsdale Co. Houses, 12-14, 16-18, 20-22, 24-26 Blackstone St., Lonsdale, RI (1917)
- Stillwater Co. Houses, 23, 33 Burrill Rd., 11, 20, 36, 45, 50, 66, 80, 90 N. Hill Rd., 4, 22, 36, 50 Park Ave., 63, 75, 95, 107, 125, 145, 155 & 171 Steere Rd., Harrisville, RI (1918)
- Rhode Island Malleable Iron Works, 697 Jefferson Blvd., Hillsgrove, RI (1918) - All but the administration building has been demolished.
- Charles Brown House, 64 Ocean Ave., Pawtuxet, RI (1919)
- Industrial Trust Co. Branch, 39 Warren Ave., East Providence, RI (1920)
- Lonsdale Co. Houses, 152-154, 156-158 & 164-166 Lonsdale Main St., Lonsdale, RI (1920)
- Henry S. Newcombe House, 2950 Boston Neck Rd., Saunderstown, RI (1921)
- Industrial Trust Co. Branch, 1 Fountain Sq., Pascoag, RI (1922)
- Davisville Free Library, 481 Davisville Rd., Davisville, RI (1923)
- Pascoag Free Public Library, 57 Church St., Pascoag, RI (1923)
- South County Public Service Co. Building, 53-55 High St., Westerly, RI (1926)
- St. Mary's Home for Children, 420 Fruit Hill Ave., Fruit Hill, RI (1927)
- Dawson Brown Gates, Yawgoog Scout Reservation, 61 Camp Yawgoog Rd., Rockville, RI (1931)
- Rhode Island State Police Barracks, 54 Nooseneck Hill Rd., Wyoming, RI (1931)
- Rhode Island State Police Barracks, 1575 Old Louisquisset Pk., Lincoln, RI (1931)
- Administration Building, 572 Airport Rd., T. F. Green Airport, Warwick, RI (1932)
- Assembly Theatre, 26 East Ave., Harrisville, RI (1933)
- Bucklin Memorial Building, Yawgoog Scout Reservation, 61 Camp Yawgoog Rd., Rockville, RI (1933)
- Burrillville Town Building, 105 Harrisville Main St., Harrisville, RI (1933)
- Remodeling, First Universalist Church, 134 Harrisville Main St., Harrisville, RI (1933)
- Rhode Island State Police Barracks, 7875 Post Rd., Wickford, RI (1933)
- Ninth District Courthouse, 105 Harrisville Main St., Harrisville, RI (1934) - Now the Town Hall Annex.
- Rhode Island State Police Barracks, 838 E. Main Rd., Portsmouth, RI (1935)
- Burrillville High School, 75 Callahan School St., Harrisville, RI (1936) - Now the William L. Callahan School.
- Green Hall, 35 Campus Ave., University of Rhode Island, Kingston, RI (1936)
- Manager's House, Agawam Hunt Club, 15 Roger Williams Ave., Phillipsdale, RI (1936)
- Jesse M. Smith Memorial Library, 144 Harrisville Main St., Harrisville, RI (1937) - Now houses town offices.
- Passenger Terminal & Hangar No. 1, 660 Airport Rd., T. F. Green Airport, Hillsgrove, RI (1937) - Demolished in 2013.
- Jesse H. Metcalf Lodge, Yawgoog Scout Reservation, 61 Camp Yawgoog Rd., Rockville, RI (1939)
- Hangar No. 2, 554 Airport Rd., T. F. Green Airport, Hillsgrove, RI (1940)
- Industrial Trust Co. Branch, 3033 Post Rd., Apponaug, RI (1948)
- U. S. Post Office, 131 Harrisville Main St., Harrisville, RI (1952) - Built by and donated to the federal government by Austin L. Levy.
- Pontiac Free Library, 101 Greenwich Ave., Pontiac, RI (1956)
- Rhode Island State Police Barracks, 1116 Putnam Pk., Chepachet, RI (1956)

In Connecticut:

- John R. Gladding House, 236 Thompson Hill Rd., Thompson, CT (1917)
- Mystic Museum of Art, 9 Water St., Mystic, CT (1931)

In Massachusetts:

- Chester T. Reed House, 354 Salisbury St., Worcester, MA (1916)
- Blackstone Manufacturing Co. Boardinghouse, 8 Butler St., Blackstone, MA (1920)

In New York:

- Myron Taylor Hall, 524 College Ave., Cornell University, Ithaca, NY (1932)

== Works of Hilton and Jackson ==
- Howard K. Hilton House, 100 Brown St., Providence, RI (1902)
- Mabel and Emily Ellis House, 244 Irving Ave., Providence, RI (1903)
- Kinghorn-Webb House, 33 Cushing St., Providence, RI (1903)
- Albert Gerald House, 194 Arlington Ave., Providence, RI (1904)
- Sarah T. Harrison House, 103 Lloyd Ave., Providence, RI (1904)
- Rose C. Hilton House, 12 Olive St., Providence, RI (1909)

== Works of Jackson & Robertson and Fraser & Henthorne ==
As Jackson & Robertson:

- Potter Home for Nurses, Butler Hospital, 345 Blackstone Blvd., Providence, RI (1911)

As Fraser & Henthorne:

- Austin T. Levy School, 135 Harrisville Main St., Harrisville, RI (1959)
- Woodward Hall, 9 E. Alumni Ave., University of Rhode Island, Kingston, RI (1960)
- Butterfield Hall, 1 Butterfield Rd., University of Rhode Island, Kingston, RI (1961)

== Gallery of architectural works ==
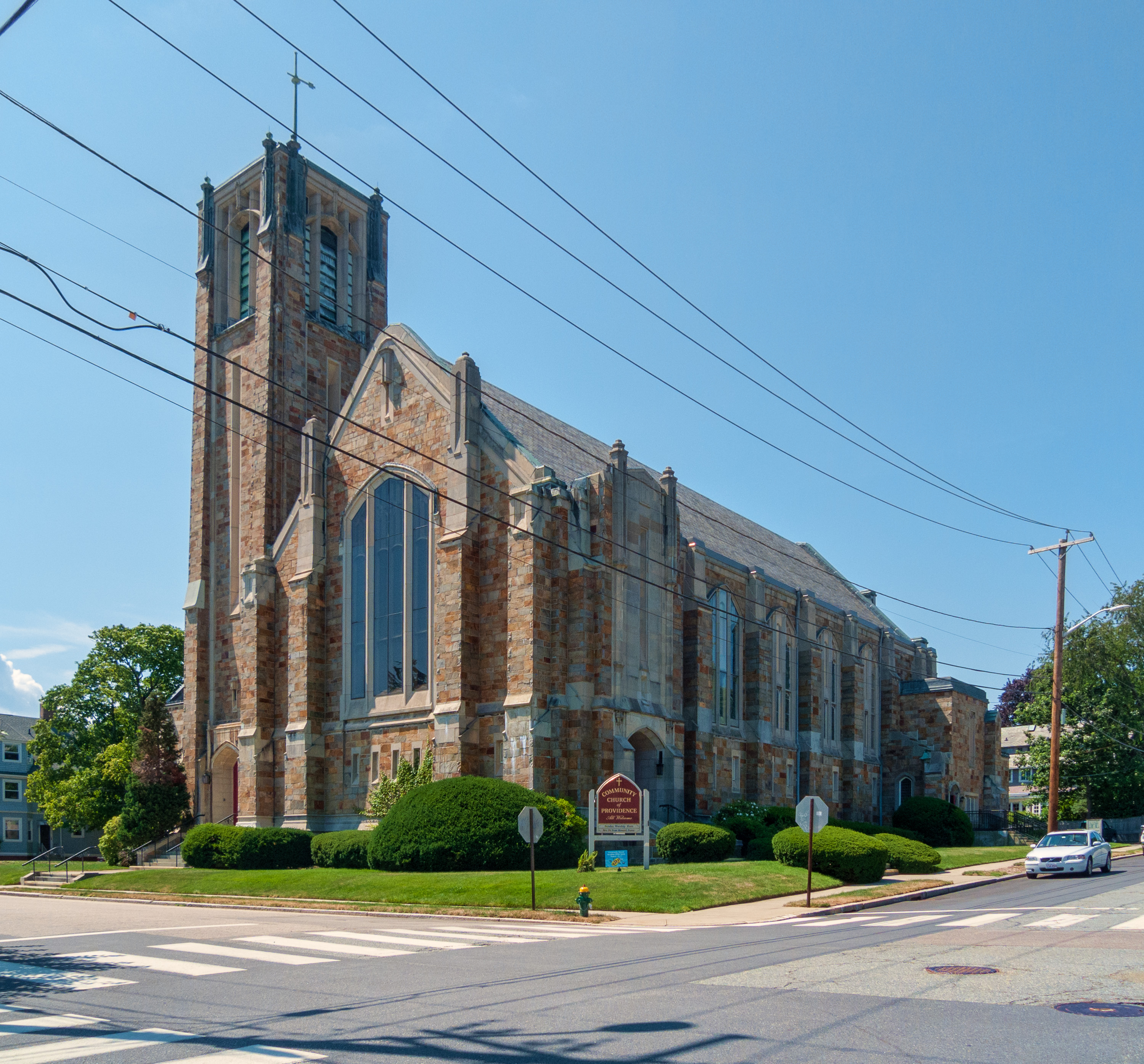
Central Baptist Church, Providence, Rhode Island, 1915.

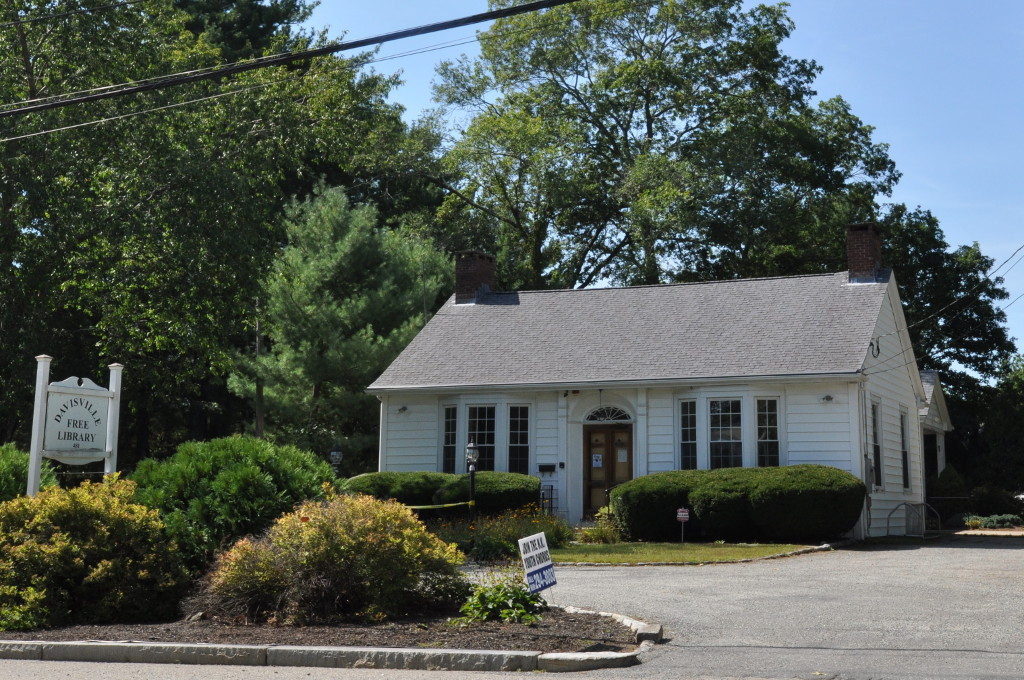
Davisville Free Library, Davisville, Rhode Island, 1923.

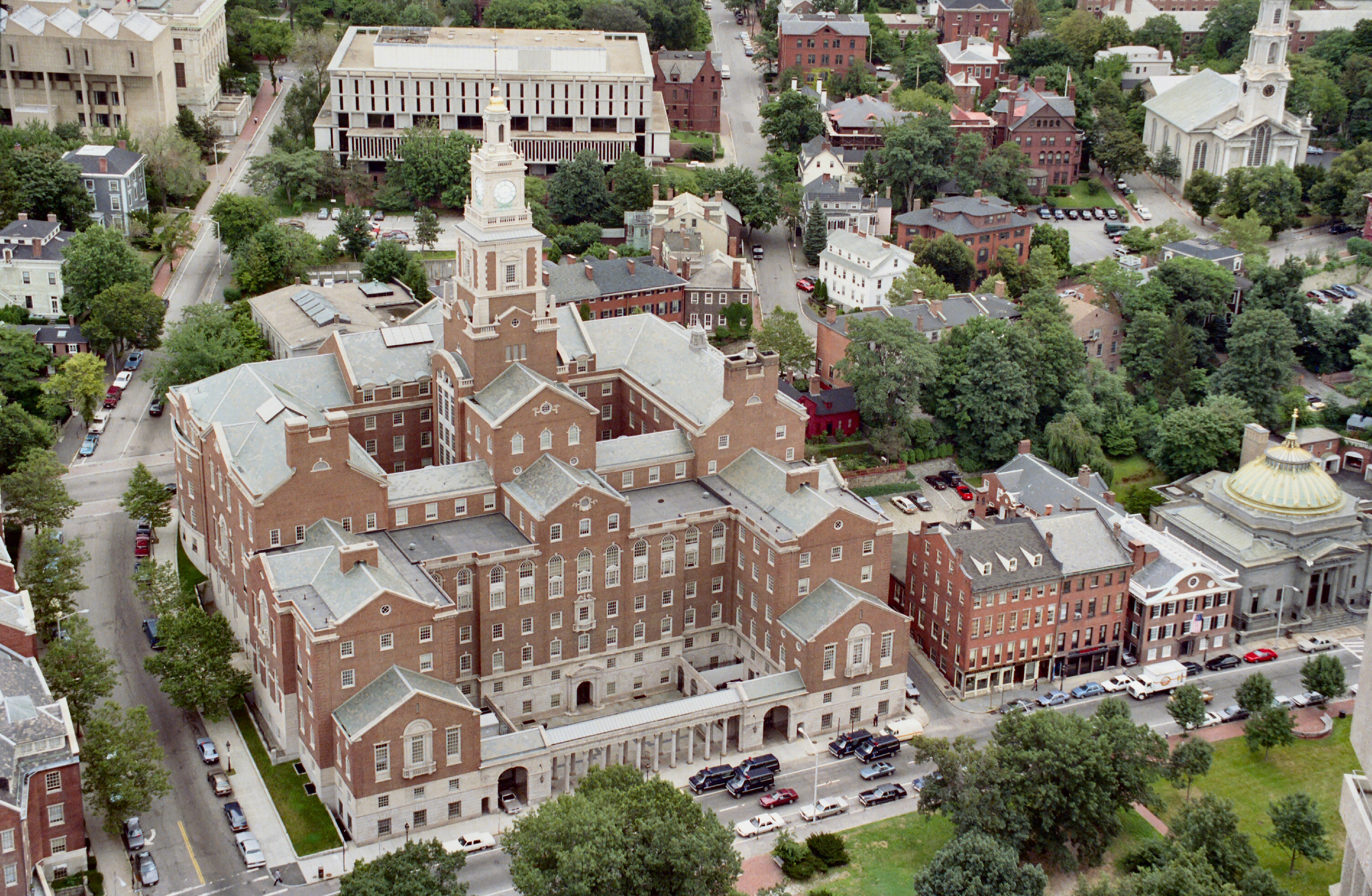
Aerial view of the Providence County Courthouse, 1924-33.

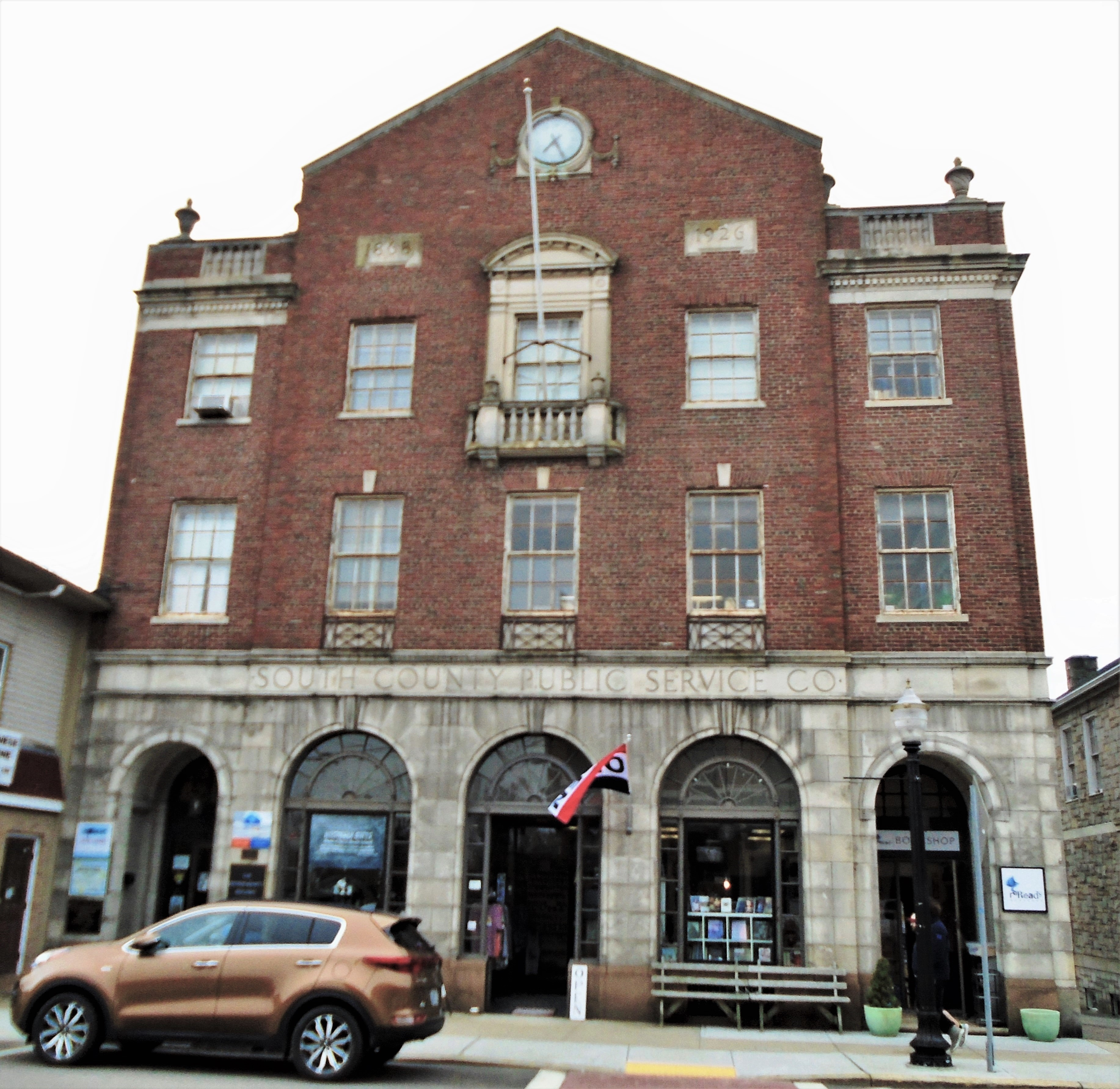
South County Public Service Company Building, Westerly, Rhode Island, 1926.

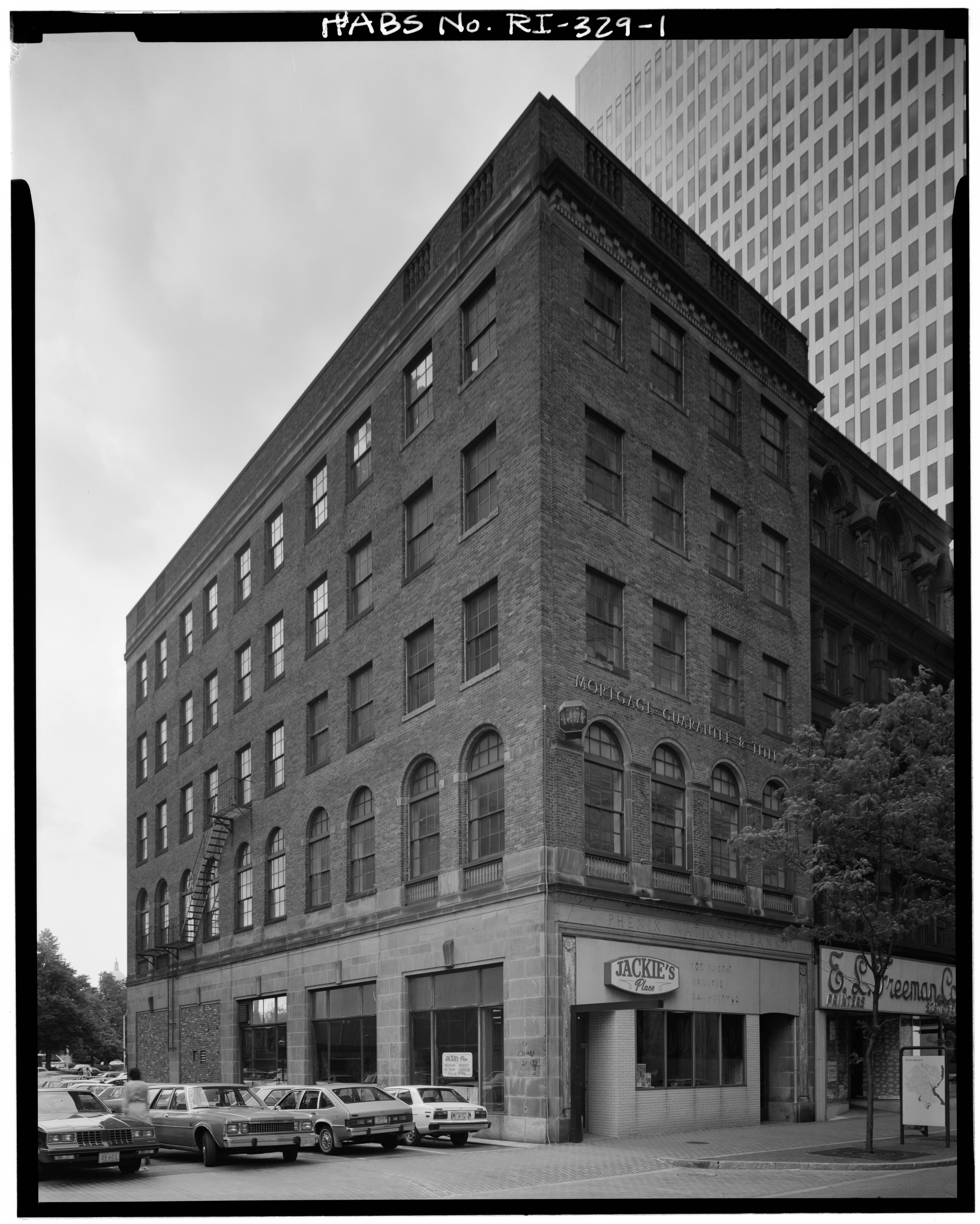
Phenix National Bank Building, Providence, Rhode Island, 1927.

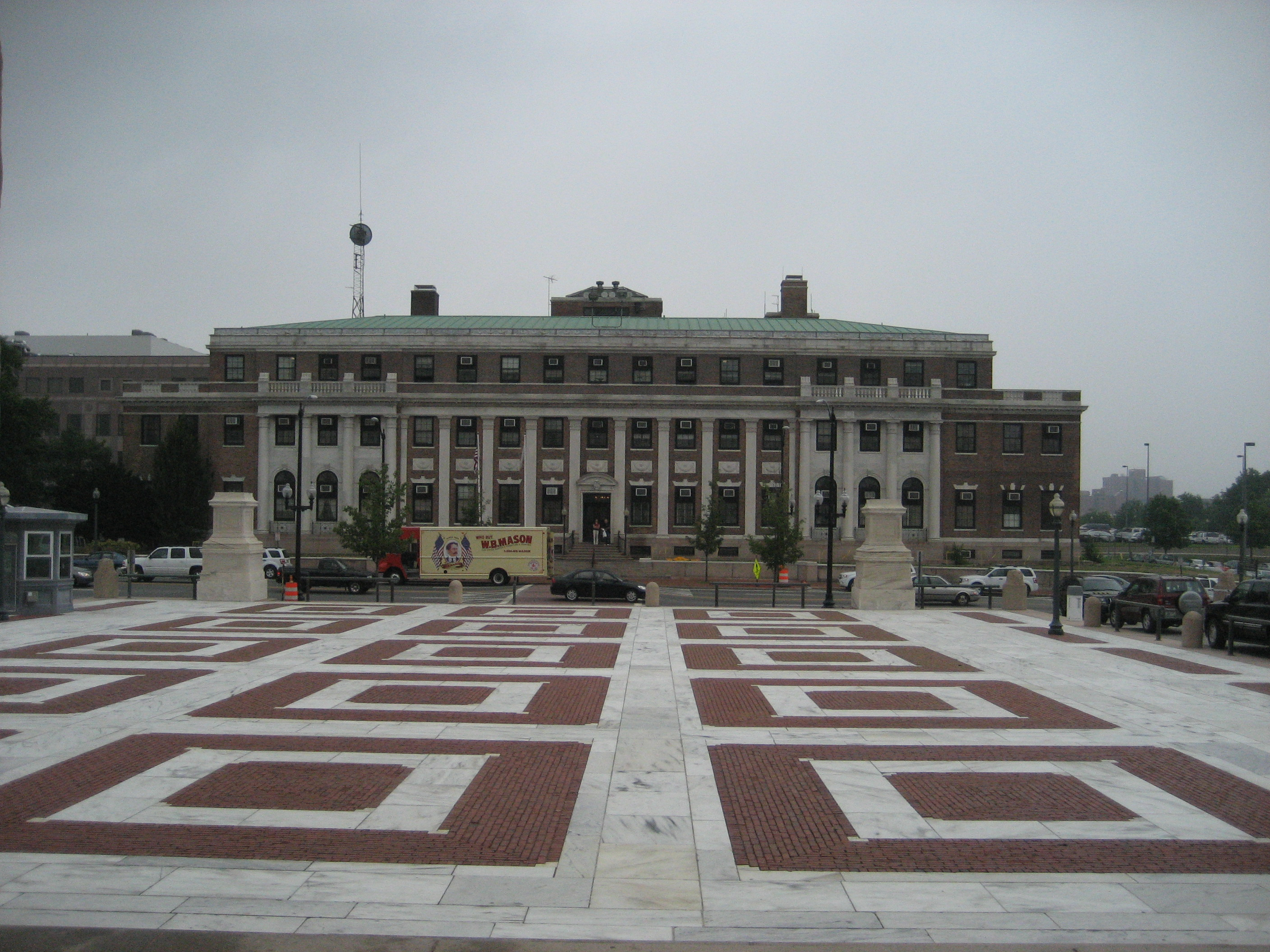
Rhode Island State Office Building, Providence, Rhode Island, 1927.

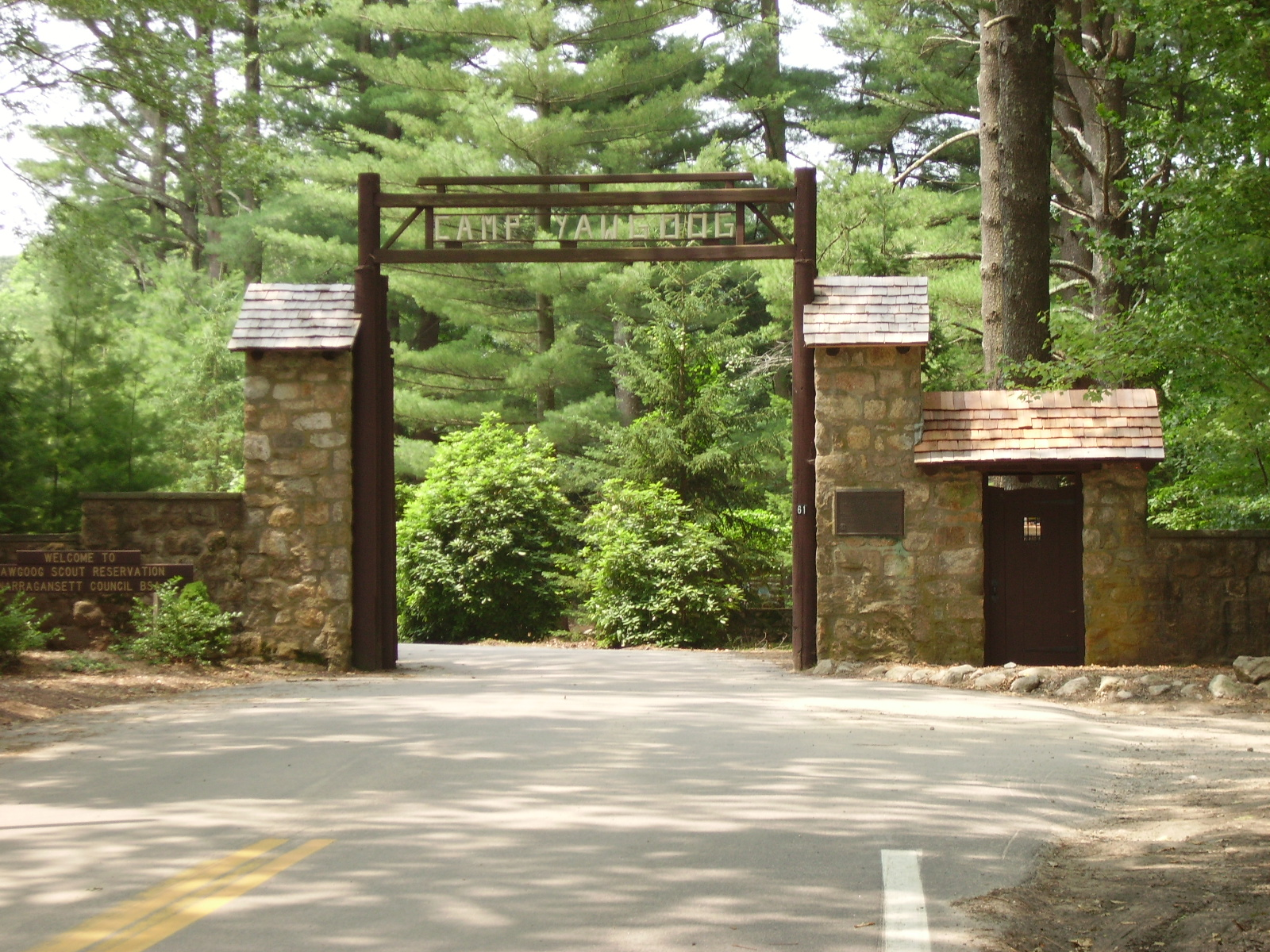
Dawson Brown Gate, Yawgoog Scout Reservation, Rockville, Rhode Island, 1931.

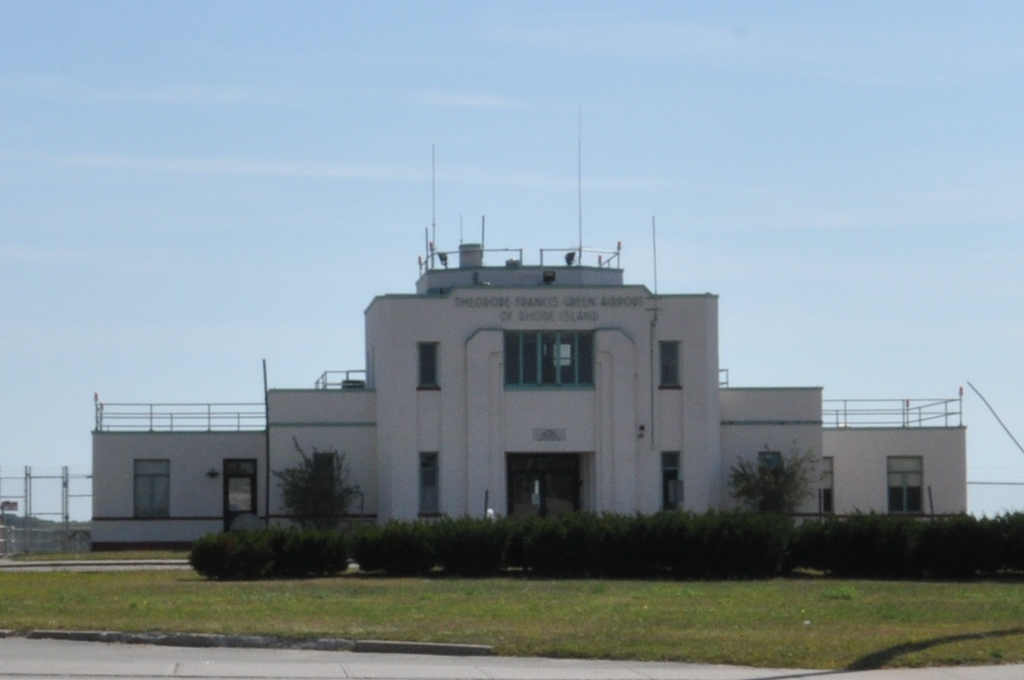
Administration Building, T. F. Green Airport, Warwick, Rhode Island, 1932.

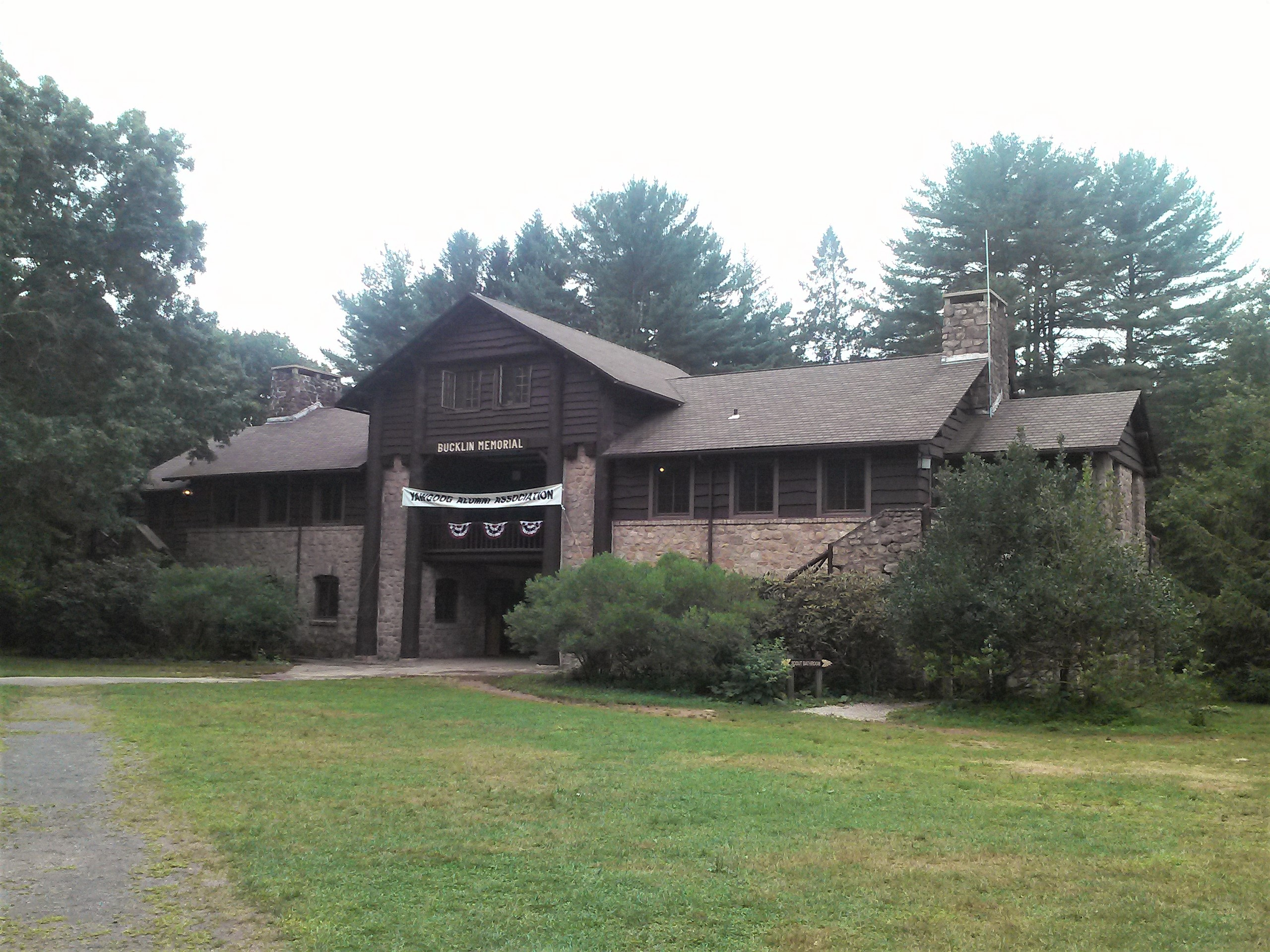
Bucklin Memorial Building, Yawgoog Scout Reservation, Rockville, Rhode Island, 1932.

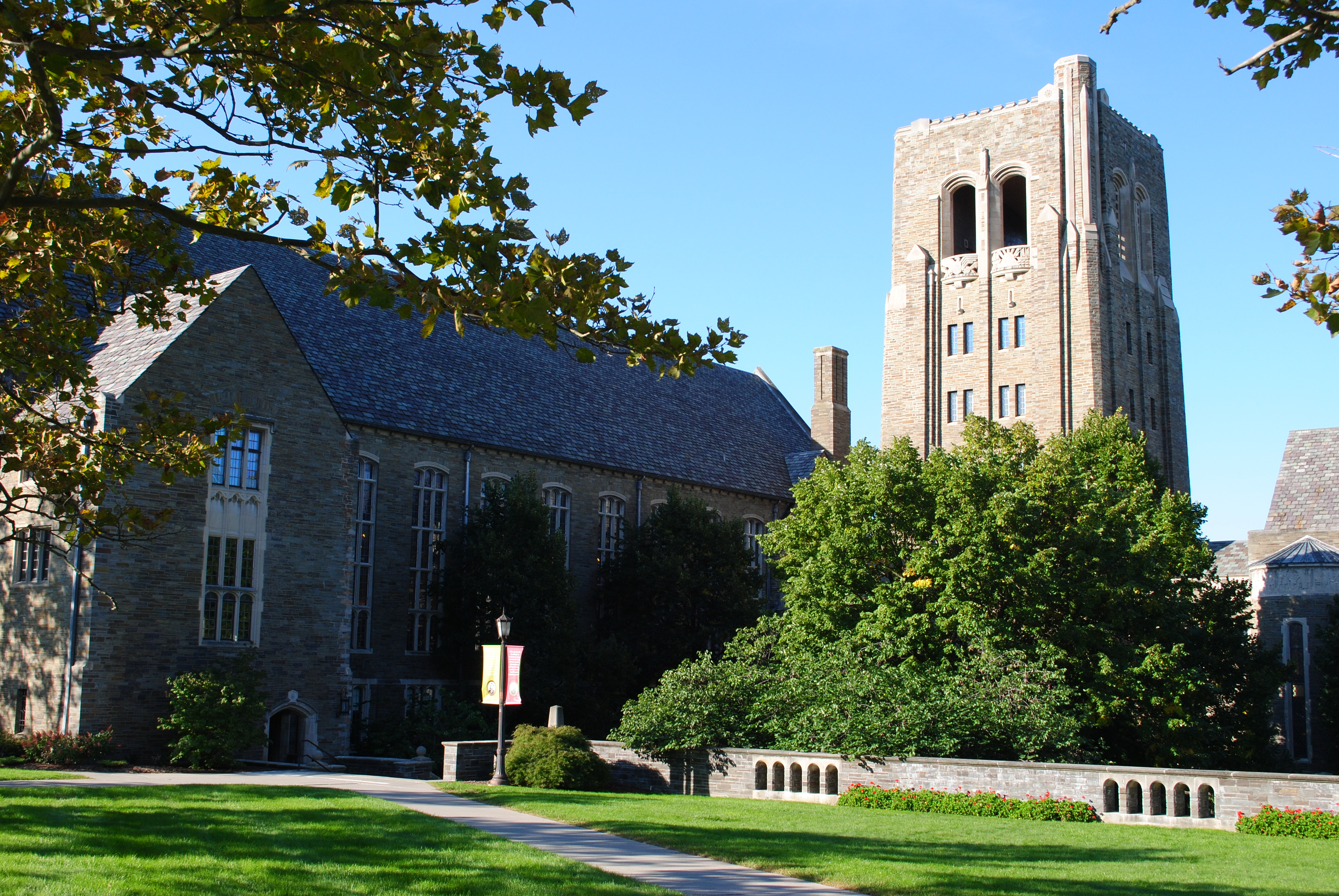
Myron Taylor Hall, Cornell University, Ithaca, New York, 1932.

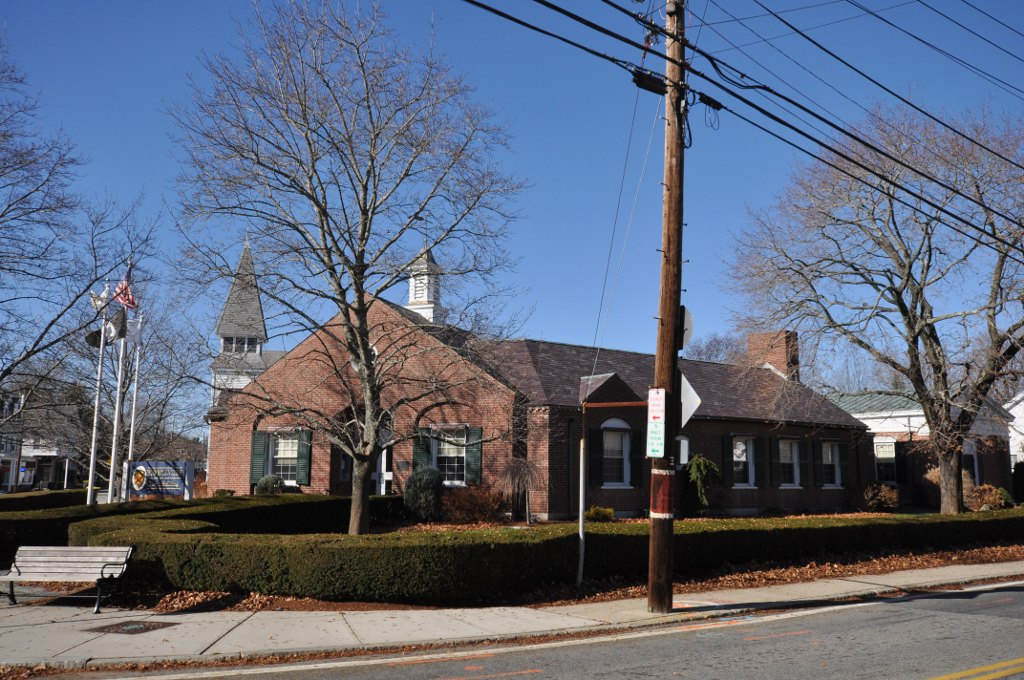
Burrillville Town Building, Harrisville, Rhode Island, 1933.

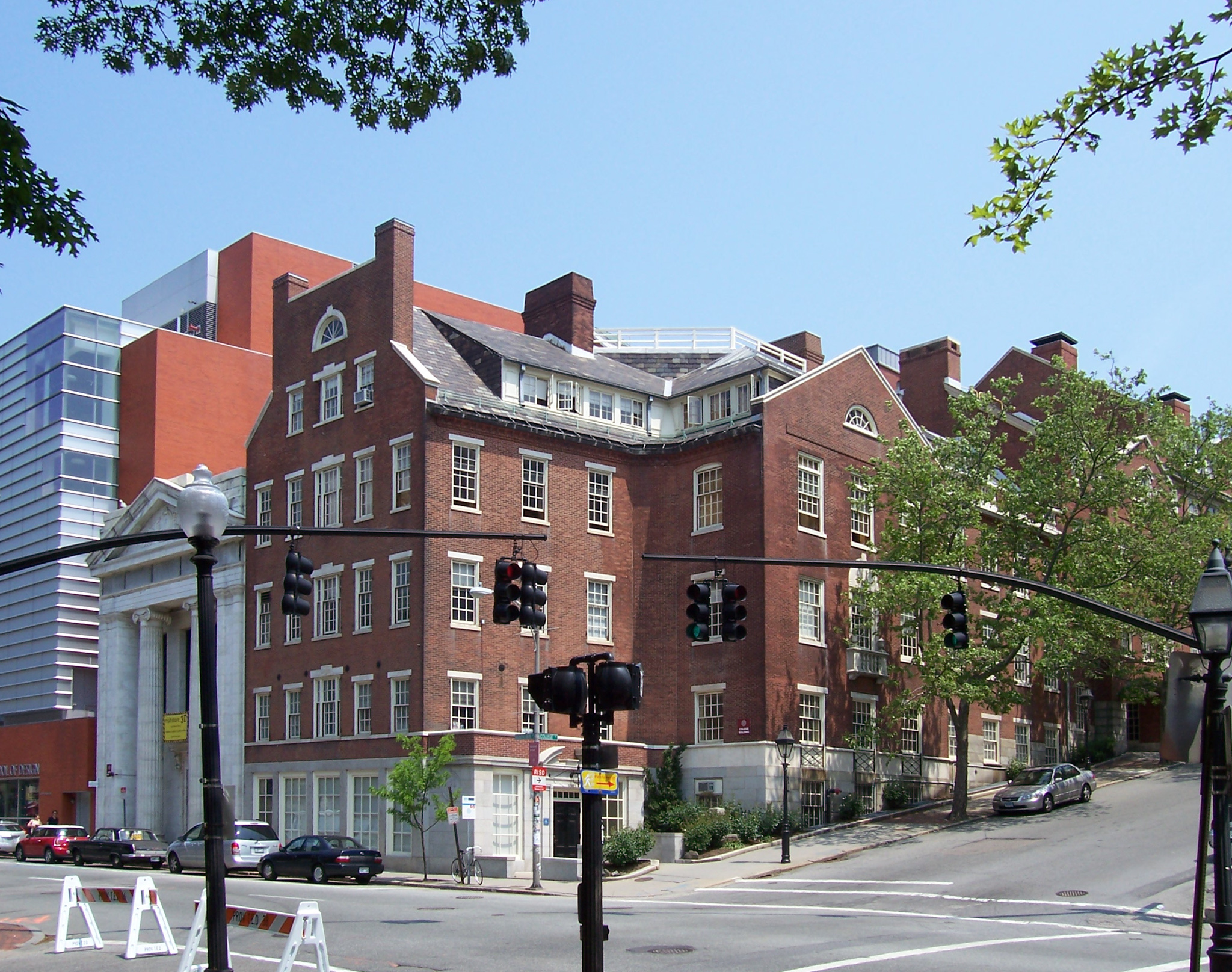
College Building, Rhode Island School of Design, Providence, Rhode Island, 1936.

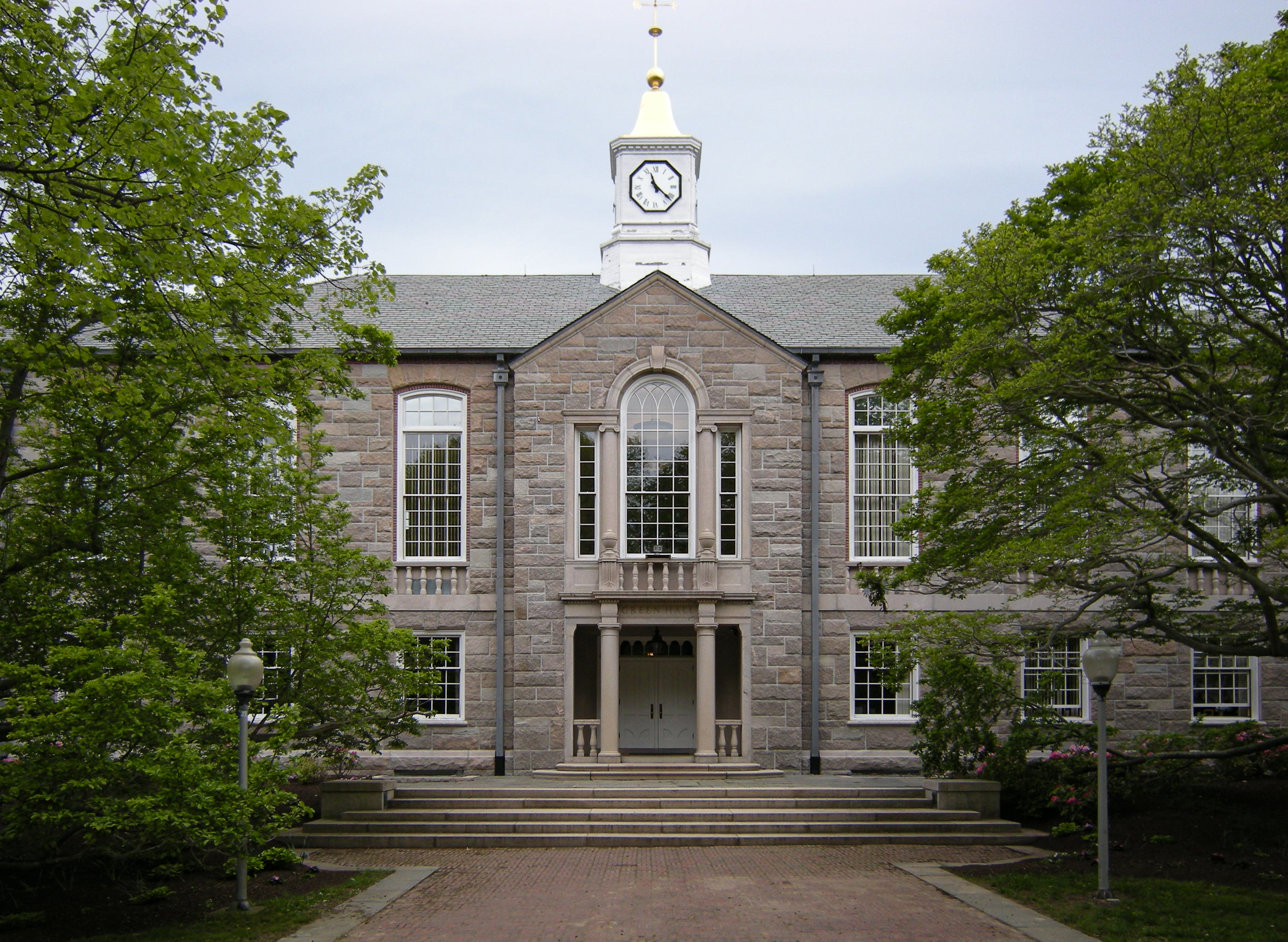
Green Hall, University of Rhode Island, Kingston, Rhode Island, 1936.

United States Post Office Annex, Providence, Rhode Island, 1939.

Interior view of the United States Post Office Annex, Providence, Rhode Island, 1939.
