= John O. Pastore Federal Building =

Building in Providence, Rhode Island, US

- Interactive map of the John O. Pastore Federal Building area

General information
- Coordinates: 41°49′34″N 71°24′39″W

The John O. Pastore Federal Building is a courthouse of the United States District Court for the District of Rhode Island located in Providence, Rhode Island. The building also houses a post office.

== Building history ==
Post offices in cities such as Providence initially occupied rented quarters in commercial buildings. As the United States became more populous and prosperous, designs for post office buildings were developed. Providence's first federal building and custom house, built in the Italianate style, was constructed 1855-1857. As the city grew, the need for more space became apparent. In 1908, a new courthouse, post office, and custom house building in the Beaux Arts style was erected at the northeast end of Exchange Place Mall (now Kennedy Plaza). Both of these buildings remain on their original sites and are listed in the National Register of Historic Places.

By the late 1920s, the need for additional space again became urgent. The city selected a site adjacent to the 1908 Federal Building and U.S. Courthouse. A local architectural firm, Jackson, Robertson & Adams, received the commission to design an annex to the Beaux Arts building. This firm also had designed the Providence County Courthouse, an addition to City Hall, the State Office Building, and the Rhode Island State Airport Terminal at Hillsgrove. Cornerstone laying ceremonies took place in September 1939. The post office annex, as it was then called, was completed by May 1940 at a cost of $896,000.

The U.S. General Services Administration acquired the building in 1961. Renamed in 1977 for former Governor and U.S. Senator John O. Pastore, the building was listed in the National Register in 1984 as a contributing building to the Downtown Providence Historic District, and individually in 2017.

== Architecture ==
Front, exterior detail

A product of the New Deal-era Works Progress Administration (WPA), the three-story Pastore Federal Building is an example of Stripped Classical architectural style, with Art Deco elements. The Stripped Classical style features classical design tenets, such as symmetry and historical references in ornamentation, but is simple in its execution. Art Deco is noted for low-relief geometrical designs, accents in terra cotta and glass, and exterior wall coverings such as concrete, smooth-faced stone, and metal.

The building's exterior materials are red brick and limestone, with a granite base. A two-story, five-bay limestone frontispiece graces the east facade. A granite balustrade extends between the two entries, while a concrete and granite ramp was added to the south entrance in 1983. Streamlined pilasters are centered between the bays of windows and doors. A simple cornice with square dentils extends along the top of the frontispiece, and is echoed by a streamlined band of limestone along the roof's edge. Bronze-clad double doors are at each entrance. Projecting, gabled brick pavilions are located at either end of the facade. Each has centered windows framed with a limestone surround.

Cast concrete sculptures on the facade were created by artist Raymond Barger, a Maryland native who studied at the Carnegie Institute and Yale. Completed in 1940, the carved sculptures were executed under the WPA's federal art program. The sculptures above the two main entrances depict stylized eagles. On the projecting pavilions, the sculptures consist of the head and torso of human figures, a sun or moon and stars, and illustrations of different means of delivering mail. A "Contact Room" on the west (rear) side connected the second-floor postal workroom to railroad tracks along the Woonasquatucket River. Metal-clad columns set in the river support the room. The sides and rear of the building feature a simplified design treatment, with a granite base, limestone string course between the second and third stories, and a limestone roof band. The windows are accented by decorative sills and plain stone lintels. Above the rear entrances, granite cladding surrounds the second-story windows.

Lobby interior

Inside, the first floor is divided into the postal lobbies and the large Postal Workroom, which encompasses approximately 90 percent of the floor area. The public spaces feature rose marble flooring and Tennessee Tarvernelle marble wainscoting. Elevator doors are sheathed in bronze and brass, and bronze trim frames the letter slots and service windows. An open screen of Greek key fretwork is above the service windows. Bulletin boards with bronze frames are alongside two classically detailed bronze writing tables, and a round writing table of similar design is near the service windows. Historic bronze light fixtures with octagonal frosted-glass pendants and eagle decorations adorn the lobby.

In 1971-1972, the building's first major renovation was completed at a cost of approximately $1 million. The Alrae Construction Company of Providence performed the renovation work. The project's main component involved conversion of the second-story workroom into office space for federal agencies. Most of the second floor's interior configuration and finishes date from this period.

The third floor has always housed a variety of offices, including that of U.S. Senator John O. Pastore, for whom the building was named. In the third-floor corridor, terrazzo flooring, marble baseboards, and molded metal doors and trim comprise the decorative finishes. Wood windows with patterned glazing in the interior walls let light from the perimeter offices into the corridor.

== History ==
- 1939-1940: Construction of federal building annex under the Works Progress Administration
- 1971-1972: Interior renovations completed
- 1977: Building renamed in honor of John O. Pastore
- 1984: Building listed in the National Register as part of Downtown Providence Historic District

== Building facts ==
- Location: 2 Exchange Terrace
- Architects: Jackson, Robertson & Adams
- Construction Dates: 1938-1940
- Architectural Style: Stripped Classical with Art Deco elements
- Landmark Status: Listed in the National Register of Historic Places as a contributing building to the Downtown Providence Historic District
- Primary Materials: Red brick and granite
- Prominent Features: Two-story limestone frontispiece; Cast concrete Art Deco reliefs; Original marble and bronze interior finishes
