= Hillsgrove, Rhode Island =

Village in Warwick, Rhode Island, U.S.

Coordinates: 41°43′34″N 71°26′21″W

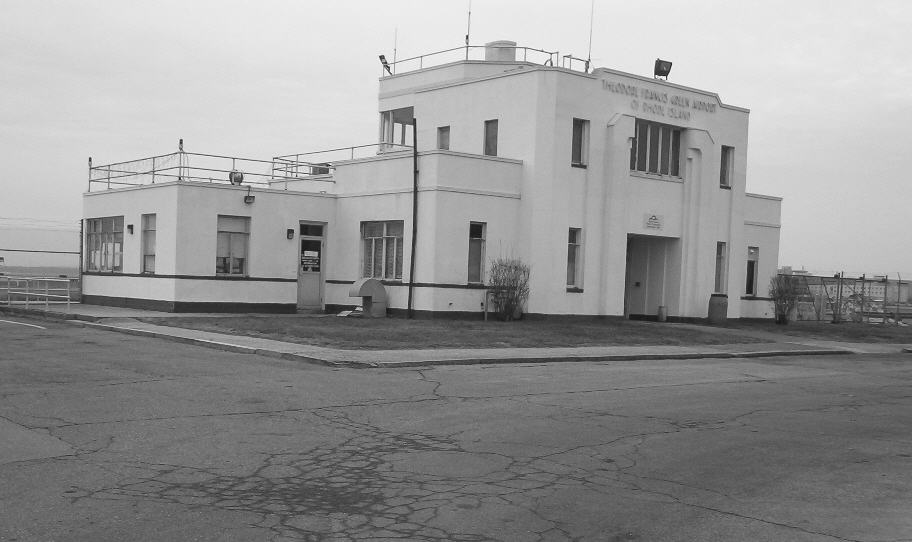
Hillsgrove State Airport Terminal, Warwick (1932)

Hillsgrove, originally Hill's Grove, is a village in western central Warwick, Rhode Island.

The village was established in 1867. It consists of the area of Warwick centered on the intersection of Kilvert Street and Jefferson Boulevard, on both sides of the railroad tracks. Directly north of the village proper is North Hillsgrove, a typical early to mid-twentieth century suburban neighborhood.

In 1867 industrialist Thomas Jefferson Hill built the Rhode Island Malleable Iron Works at what is today Jefferson Boulevard and Kilvert Street. In 1870, he built his house, now demolished, on Jefferson Boulevard. In 1875, Hill expanded his operations in the village with the Elizabeth Mill, named for his wife, Elizabeth C. Kenyon.

The Hillsgrove Methodist Episcopal Church was established in 1884. The lot at 35 Kilvert Street was donated by Hill, who also gave $3,000 for its construction in 1887. Though altered due to the airport's presence, the church still stands as the home of the Open Table of Christ. The village's other main church, St. Francis of Assisi Roman Catholic Church, was established in 1899 as a mission of St. Joseph's, Natick. The original church was built in 1900 at 610 Jefferson Boulevard. This building was torn down in 1960 for the parish's current school and church building. By 1915, the original Hillsgrove School had become too small, and was replaced by one designed by Thomas J. Hill Pierce of Providence. This school, a reserved Colonial Revival structure, has been demolished. In 1918, the original buildings of the Iron Works burned, and were replaced by a group designed by Jackson, Robertson & Adams of Providence. With the exception of the administration building, these buildings were demolished in 2002 for a hotel.

In 1929, Hillsgrove was selected as the site of Hillsgrove State Airport, now T. F. Green Airport, the largest and most important airport in the state. The airport's first terminal was built in 1932 on land purchased by the order of Frederick Stanhope Peck at 572 Airport Road, a year after the airport opened in 1931. Hangars No. 1 and No. 2 were built in 1937 and 1940, respectively. Hangar No. 1 was demolished for a runway extension in 2013. A new terminal was built in 1961 on Post Road across from Hillsgrove proper. This terminal was replaced in 1995. The most recent addition to the airport is the railway station and parking garage on Jefferson Boulevard, connected to the terminal by a quarter-mile skybridge.

Leviton Manufacturing formerly operated a large factory here, fabricating electronic components for many years. The Elizabeth Mill, which housed Leviton, was slated for redevelopment but was demolished in 2015.

The major thoroughfares in the village are Post Road, Jefferson Boulevard, and Coronado Road/Kilvert Street. Since the airport was opened, Hillsgrove south of Coronado Road has been gradually given over to industry, to the point where there are only 2 houses left. The northern end of Jefferson Boulevard has also become an industrial park. And the once predominantly residential Post Road has been given over to chain restaurants, hotels, car rental dealerships, and other businesses that feed off of the airport.
