= Providence County Courthouse =

Building in Providence, Rhode Island

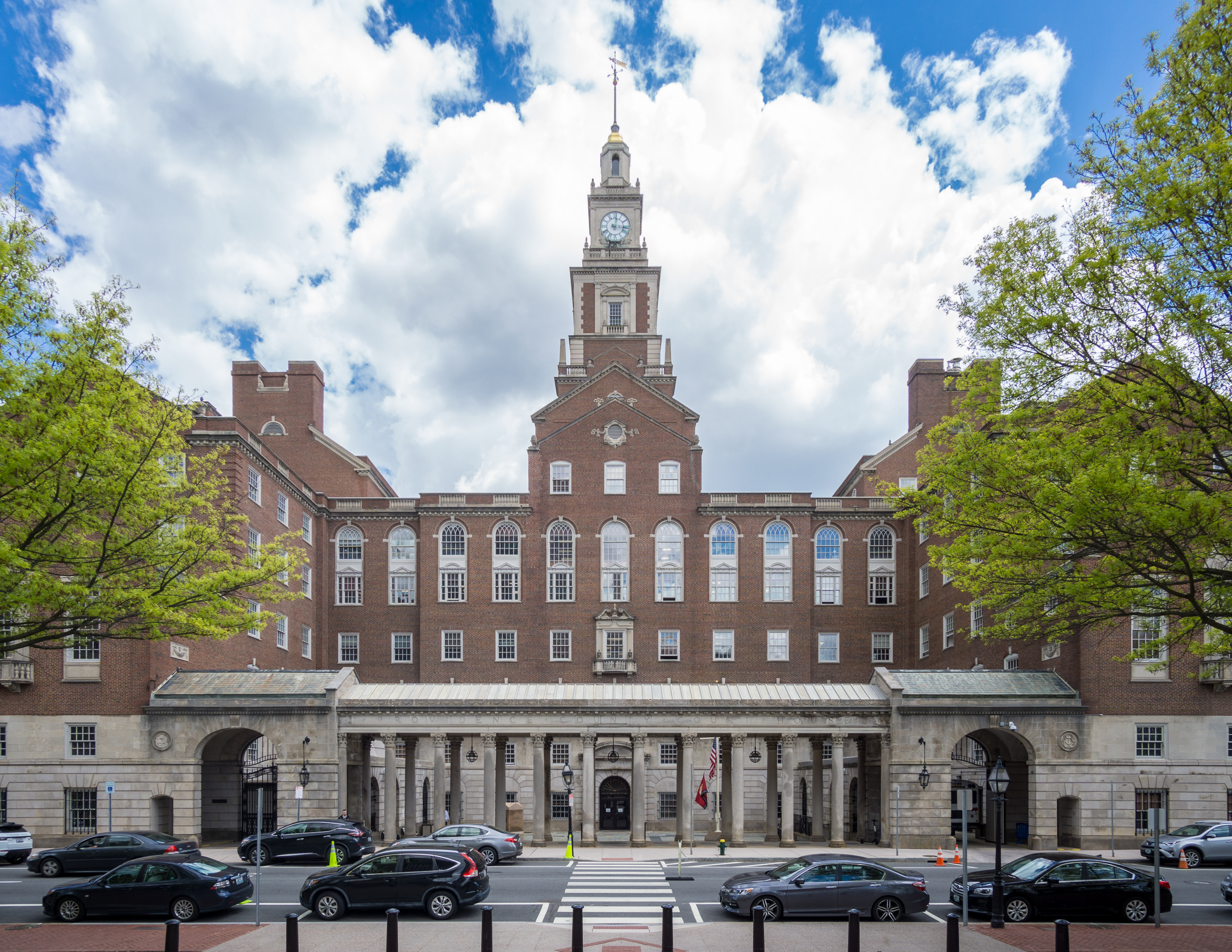

General information
- Type: Municipal
- Location: 250 Benefit Street, Providence, RI 02903, United States
- Coordinates: 41°49′31.76″N 71°24′24.84″W
- Construction started: 1926
- Completed: 1930

Height
- Roof: 216 ft (66 m)

Technical details
- Floor count: 7

Design and construction
- Architect: Jackson, Robertson & Adams

The Providence County Courthouse (also known as the Frank Licht Judicial Complex) is a Georgian Revival building in the College Hill neighborhood of Providence, Rhode Island. The building contains the state's court of last resort, the Rhode Island Supreme Court, and the local trial court, the Providence County Superior Court.

At a height of 216 ft (66 m), the courthouse is the 11th-tallest building in the city.

== History ==
=== Town house (1723–1875) ===
The lot currently occupied by the courthouse has been used for governmental and judicial purposes since the 18th century. In 1794, the city purchased a building at the southern corner of College and Benefit Streets originally built in 1723 by the First Congregational Society for use as a meeting house. Known as the "town house," this building hosted public meetings and was occasionally used as a courthouse.

=== First Providence County Courthouse (1877–1924) ===
In March 1875, the property was condemned and a city commission began work to construct a new public building at the site. The resulting courthouse, was designed by Stone & Carpenter in the High Victorian Gothic style. Work on the structure began in July 1875 and was completed in December 1877.

=== Second Providence County Courthouse (1924) ===
In 1923, a public commission began work to erect a new courthouse at the site. Among the reasons cited for the construction of a new building were the prior structure's inadequate space and lack of fireproofing.

The second and current courthouse was erected between 1924 and 1933 following a design by Jackson, Robertson & Adams.

As part of the construction process, the historic Stephen Hopkins House was moved from its original location on the lot to an adjacent property.

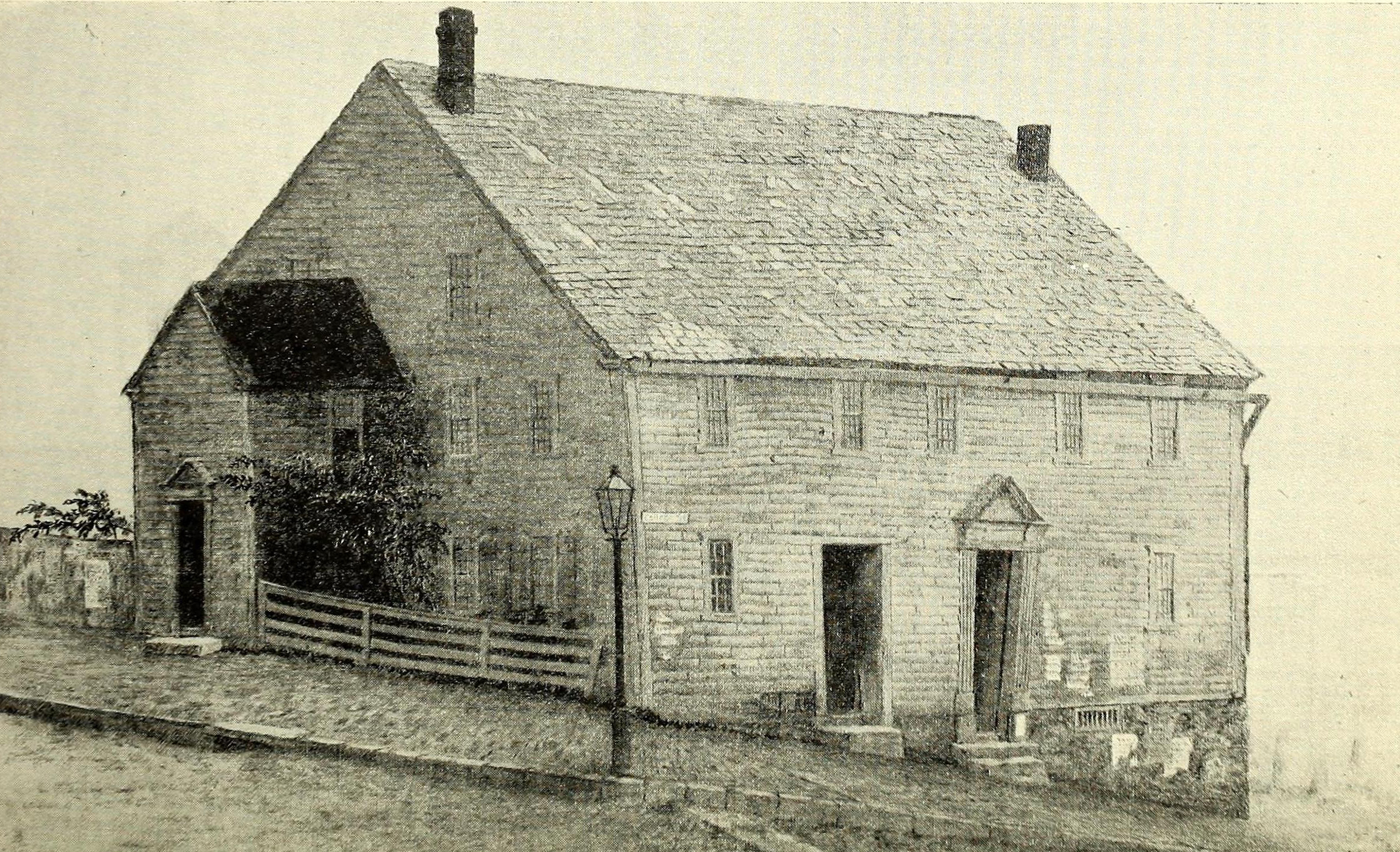
Old Town House (1723)

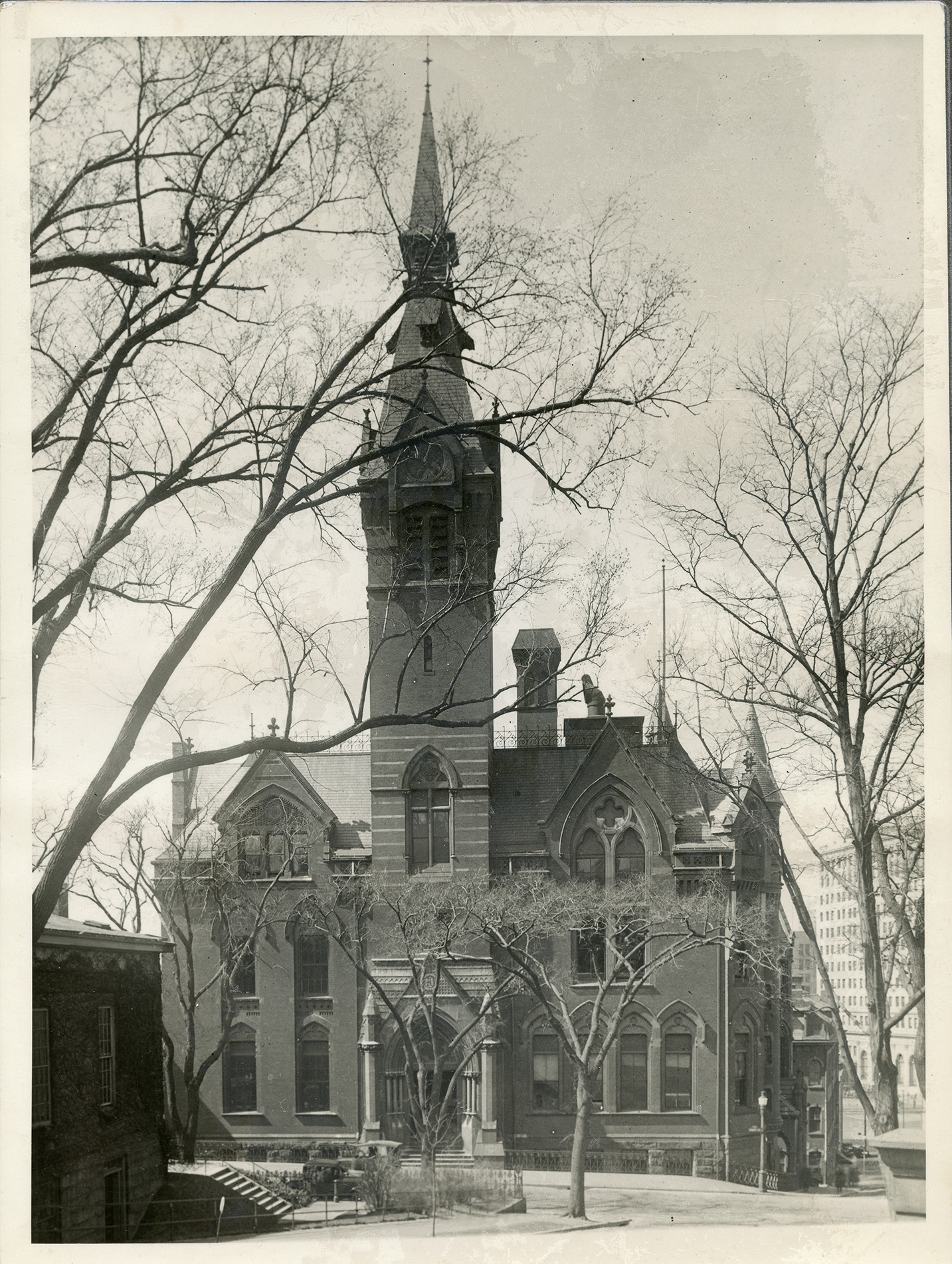
First courthouse (1875), designed by Stone & Carpenter

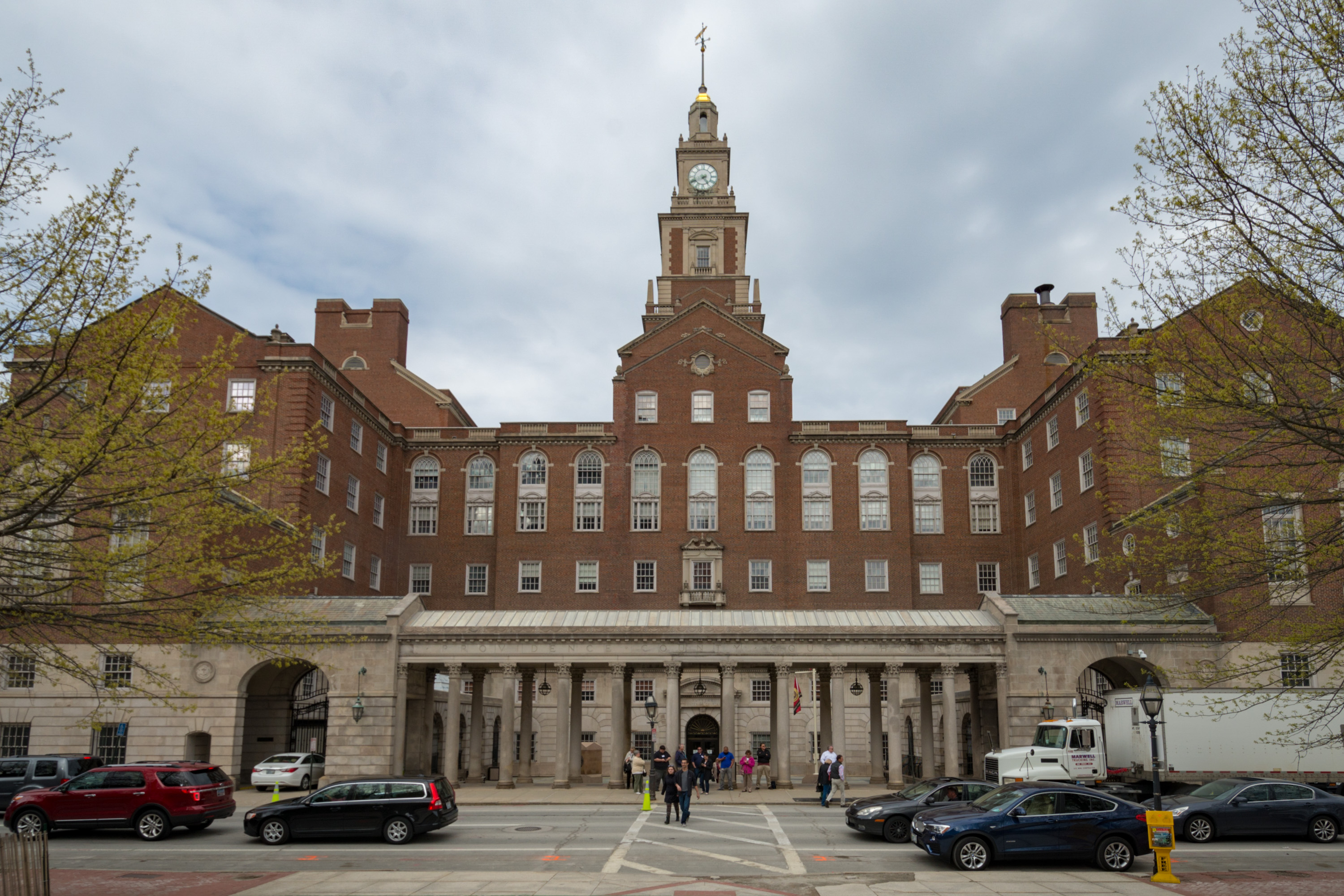
The current courthouse building, as it appears today.

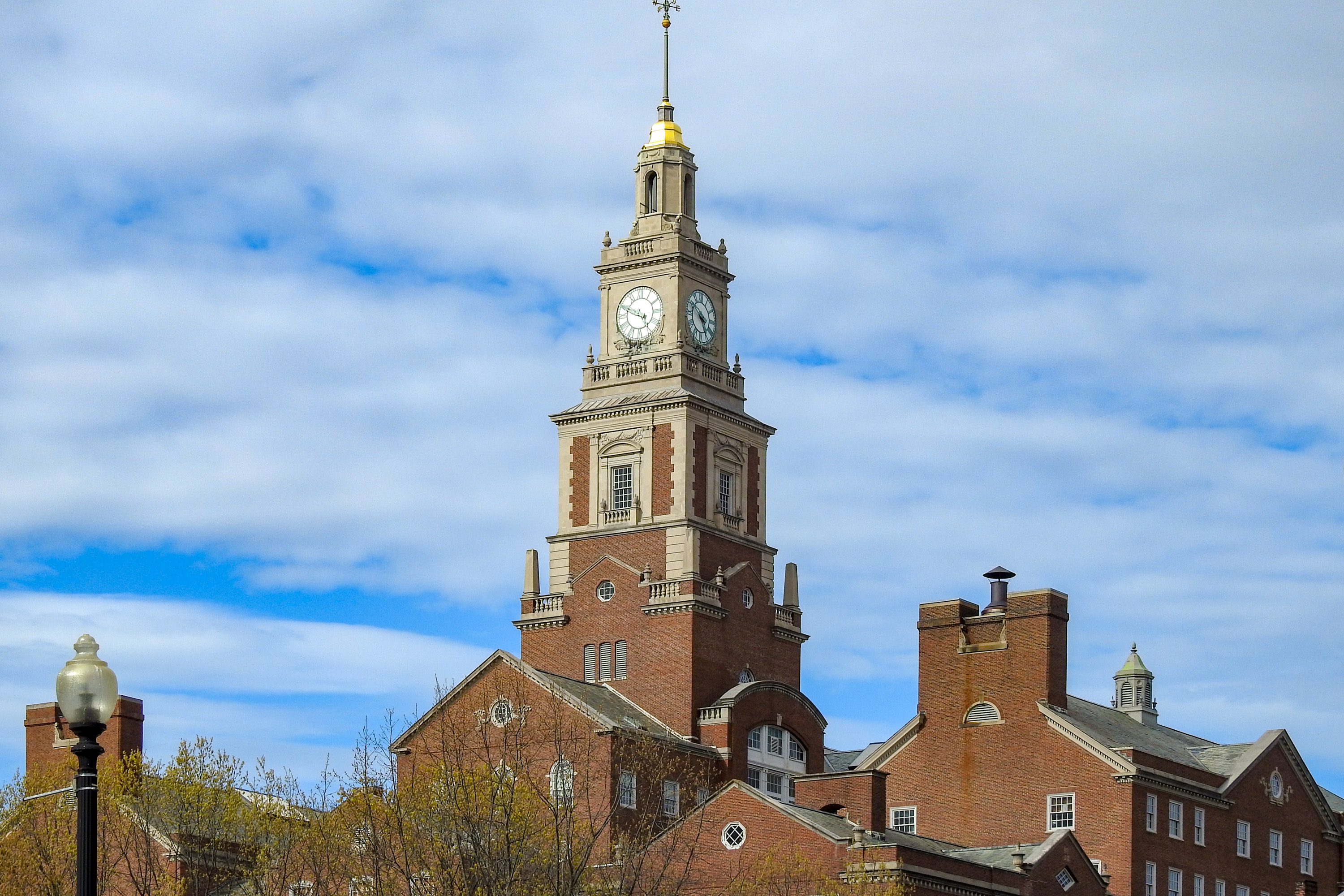
Spire of the current courthouse building

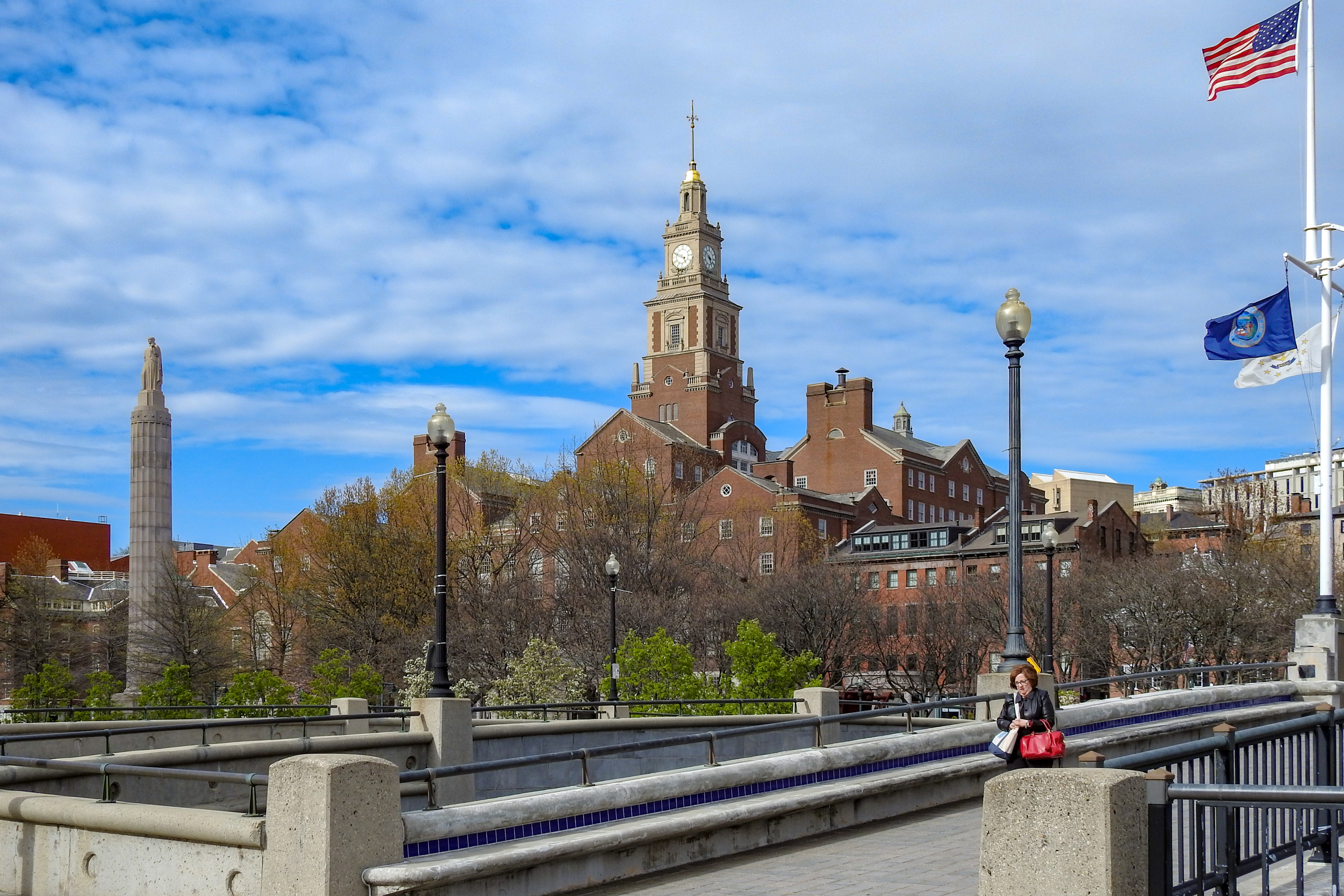
View of the courthouse from across the Providence River

== Architecture ==
The building is constructed from red brick with granite and limestone trim. The building's exterior is designed in the Georgian Revival style while the interior follows an iteration of the Federal style.

Architectural historian McKenzie Woodward lauds the building for its contextualism, which defers in its design to the buildings surrounding. Woodward also commends the fragmentation of the building's large mass into "visually digestible units".

== See also ==
- Yule marble
