= Gloria Dei Evangelical Lutheran Church =

Historic church in Rhode Island, United States

- U.S. National Register of Historic Places
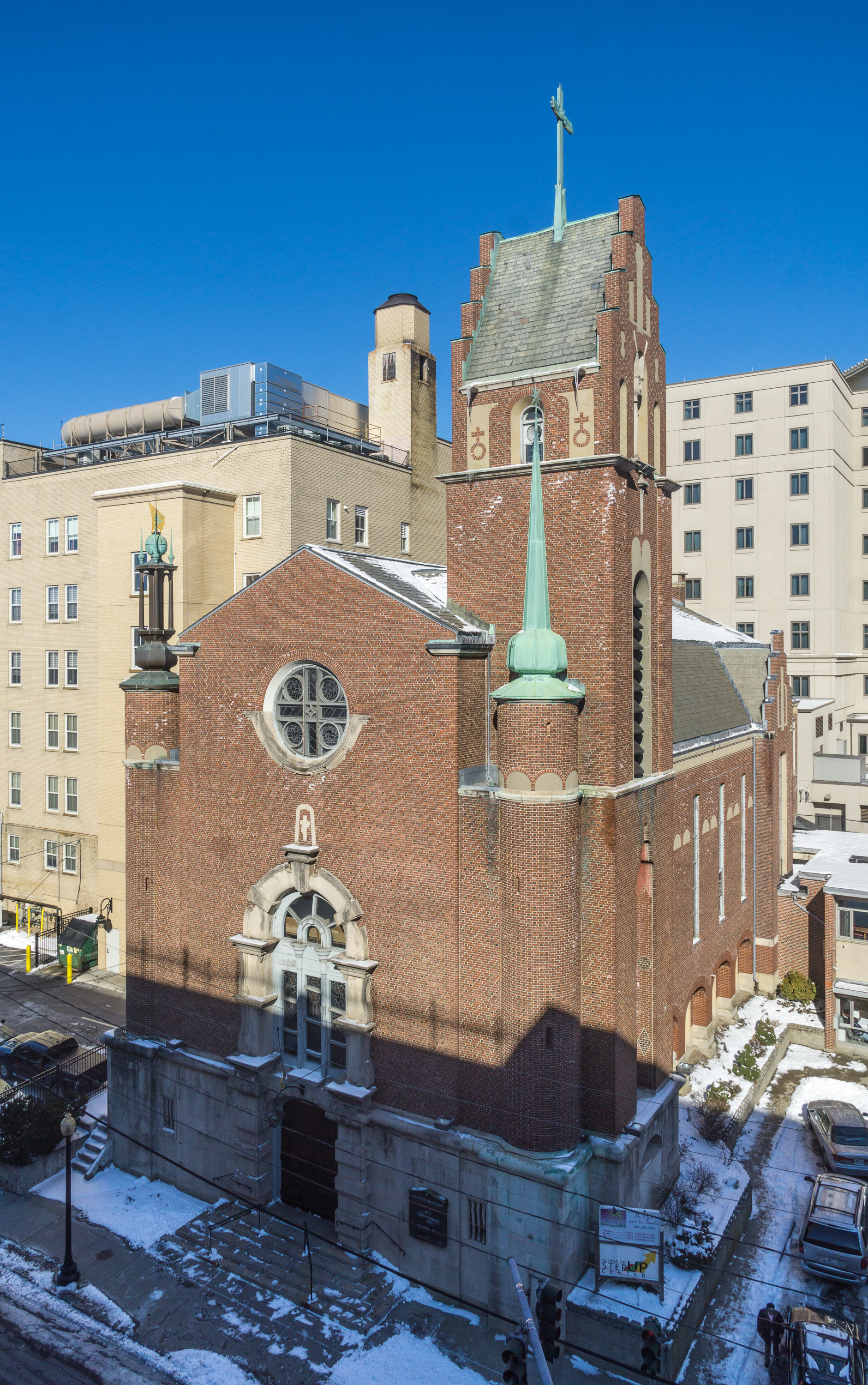

- Location within Rhode Island Location within the United States
- Location: Providence, Rhode Island
- Coordinates: 41°49′46″N 71°25′3″W
- Built: 1925
- Architect: Martin Hedmark
- NRHP reference No.: 84002006
- Added to NRHP: February 23, 1984

The Gloria Dei Evangelical Lutheran Church is an historic church at 15 Hayes Street in Providence, Rhode Island. The single-story brick structure was designed by Martin Hedmark, and built in 1925-28 for a predominantly Scandinavian congregation established in 1890. The brick is laid in patterns, and the tower features a stepped gable roof. The corners of the main facade have small turrets, one topped with a lantern spire, the other with a needle. The design includes vernacular elements of Swedish architecture, a feature not generally found in the area. Originally, the church was built for a Swedish congregation, but today accepts many other nationalities and cultures, including Angola, Liberia, Tanzania, Portugal, Germany, Haiti, Jamaica, Britain, Bolivia, Dominican Republic, Guatemala, Mexico, and numerous others.

The church was listed on the National Register of Historic Places in 1984.

== See also ==
- National Register of Historic Places listings in Providence, Rhode Island
