= Wayland Wilbur Rice =

American businessman and chemical engineer

Wayland Wilbur Rice (April 14, 1894 – July 5, 1975) was a businessman and chemical engineer, and the Vice President and Secretary of the Barreled Sunlight Paint Company in Providence, Rhode Island.

== Early life and education ==
Rice was born in Providence. Rice's father was Herbert Wayland Rice, a businessman. Rice's mother was Jennie Potter Wilbur.

Rice graduated from Brown University in 1917. He was a member of the Delta Phi fraternity.

== Career ==
Rice enlisted in the United States Army in 1917, he was a Sergeant in the Gas Defense Service in Cleveland, Ohio, and eventually rose to become a first lieutenant.

In 1919, Rice was the technical director and Vice President of the U.S. Gutta Percha Paint Co., which later became the Barreled Sunlight Company and of which he served as vice president and secretary.

He was a member of the American Society for Testing Materials. In 1926, he was granted a U.S. patent for packaging of his gutta-percha paints.

He was a Master Mason in 1936 at Adelphoi Lodge No. 33 in Riverside, Rhode Island. He was the president of the Squantum Association from 1944 to 1947. He was also a member of the Brown Club, the Rhode Island Country Club, The Turk's Head Club, and The Chemists' Club in New York. He was also a member of the Central Congregational Church.

== Personal life ==
Rice married Dorothy Barbara Gorton (1888-1934), and had two daughters, Dorothy and Nancy. They lived in Providence, Rhode Island, and summered in Buttonwoods. They are both buried at Swan Point Cemetery in Providence, Rhode Island
