= Martin Hedmark =

Swedish architect

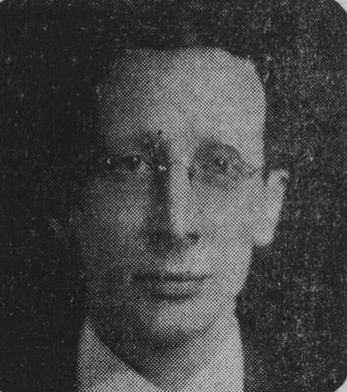
Martin Hedmark

Martin Gravely Hedmark (10 November 1896 — 13 September 1980) was a Swedish architect practicing in the United States. He was known for his designs for churches, inspired by modern Swedish architecture.

He was born in Sweden in 1896. He graduated from the Royal Institute of Technology in Stockholm in 1921. There he worked under Professor Lars Israel Wahlman, a noted architect. His education at the Institute taught him the architectural vocabulary that he used in his work. After a short practice in Sweden, he relocated to the United States. In later life he returned to Sweden, where he would die in 1980.

== Works ==
Hedmark's designs include:

- Boo Church, Boo Church Road, Boo, Sweden (1922–23)
- Gloria Dei Evangelical Lutheran Church, 15 Hayes St., Providence, RI (1925–28)
- First Lutheran Church, 65 Oakwood Ave., Kearny, NJ (1930)
- First Swedish Baptist Church, 250 E. 61st St., New York, NY (1930) - Now Trinity Baptist Church.
- Faith Chapel, Zion Lutheran Church, 41 Whitmarsh Ave., Worcester, MA (1948) - Located directly west of the main sanctuary.
  - Original building by Fuller & Delano Company of Worcester.
- Bethany Evangelical Lutheran Church, 2015 John F. Kennedy Blvd., Jersey City, NJ (1950)
- Additions to Trinity Lutheran Church, 1330 13th St., Moline, IL (1961)

== Gallery ==
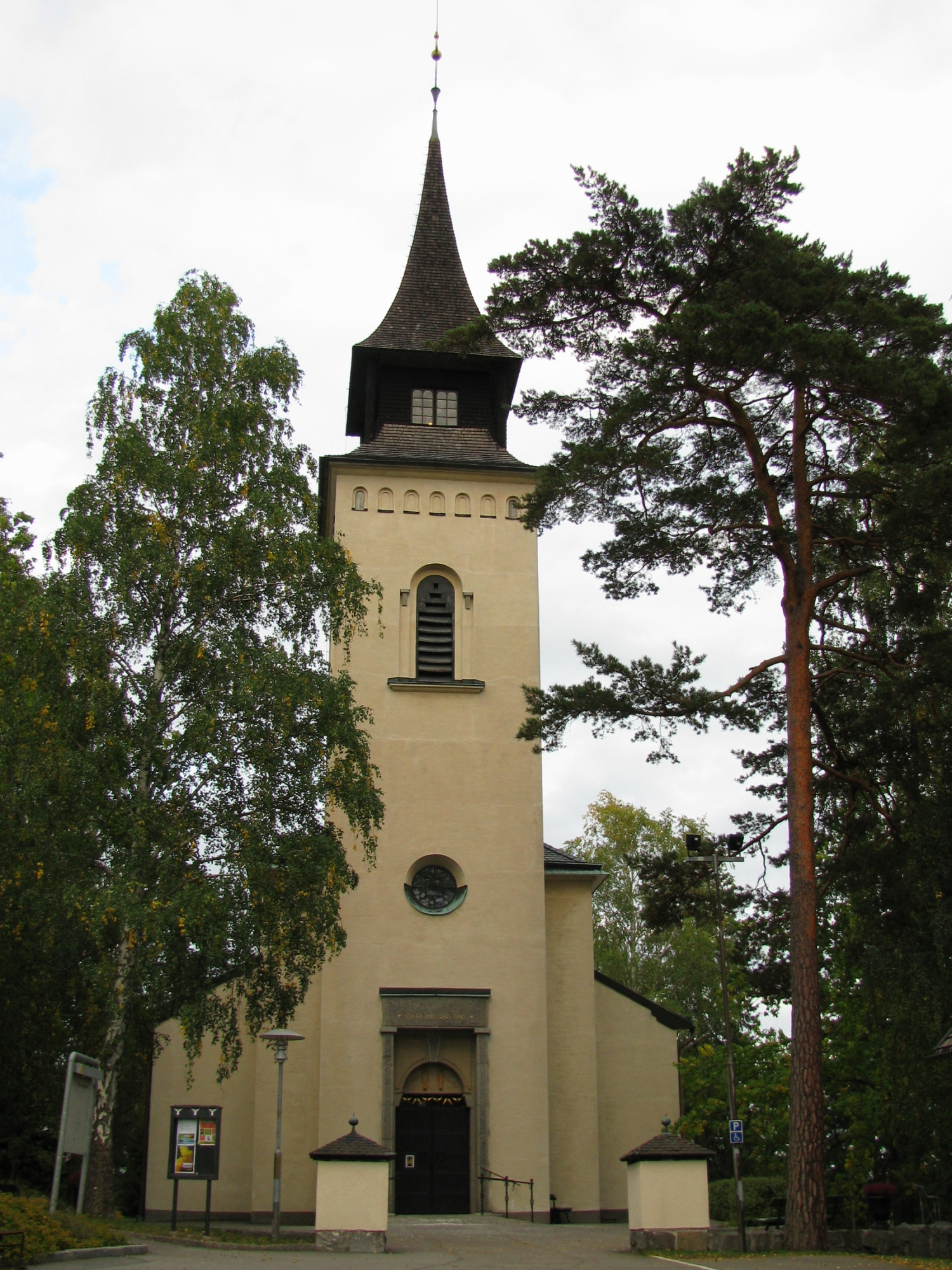
Boo Church, Boo (1922–23)

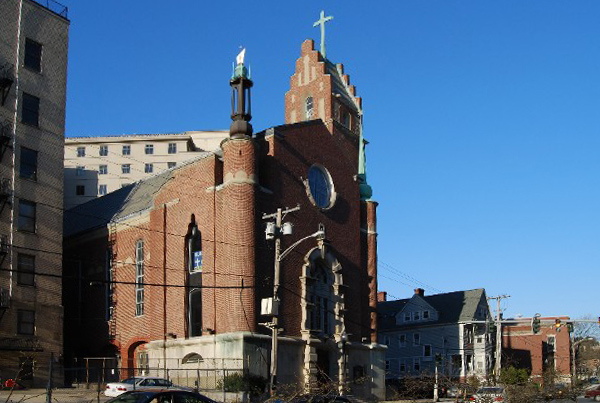
Gloria Dei Church, Providence (1925–28)

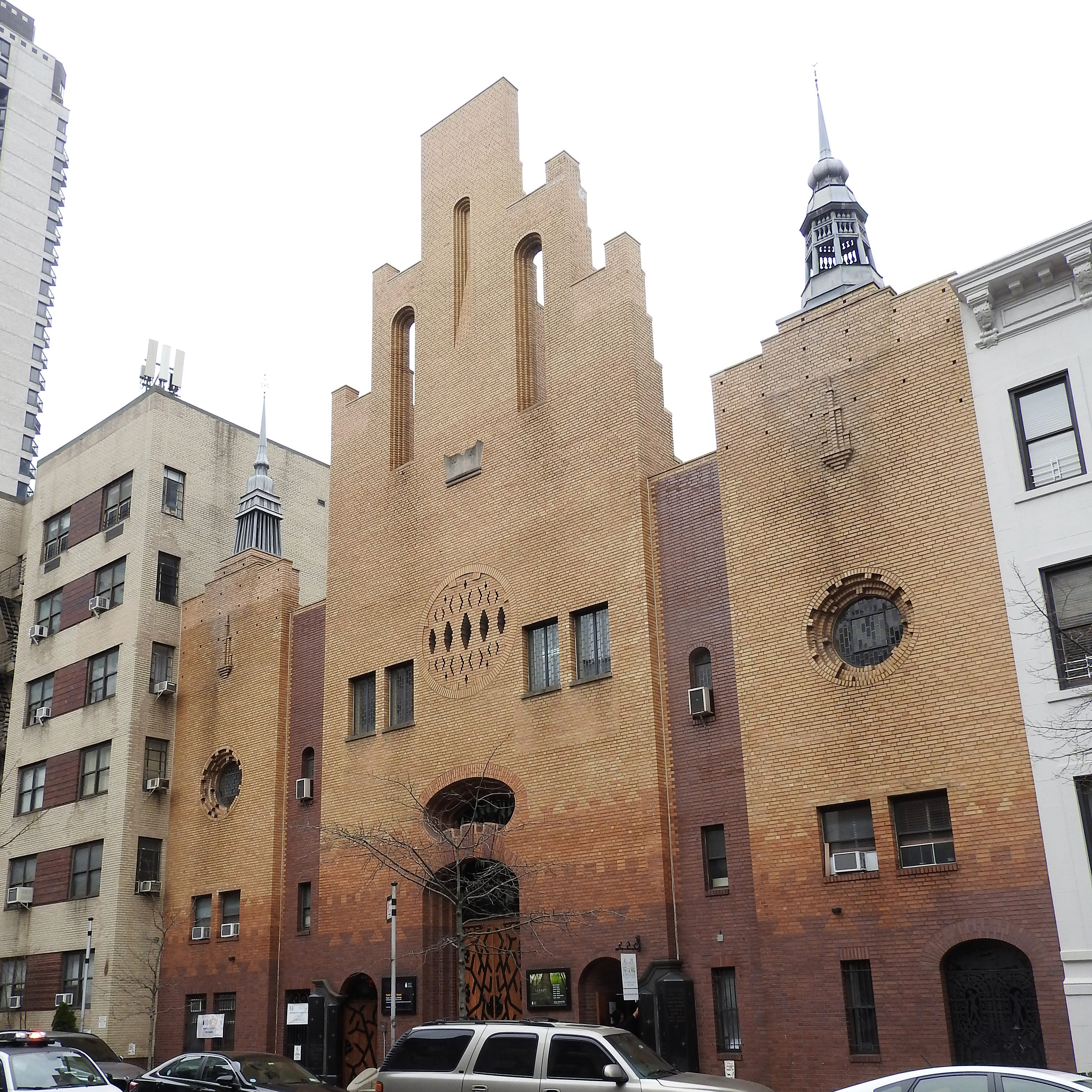
First Swedish Baptist Church (1930)
