= Rhode Island State Airport Terminal =

- U.S. National Register of Historic Places
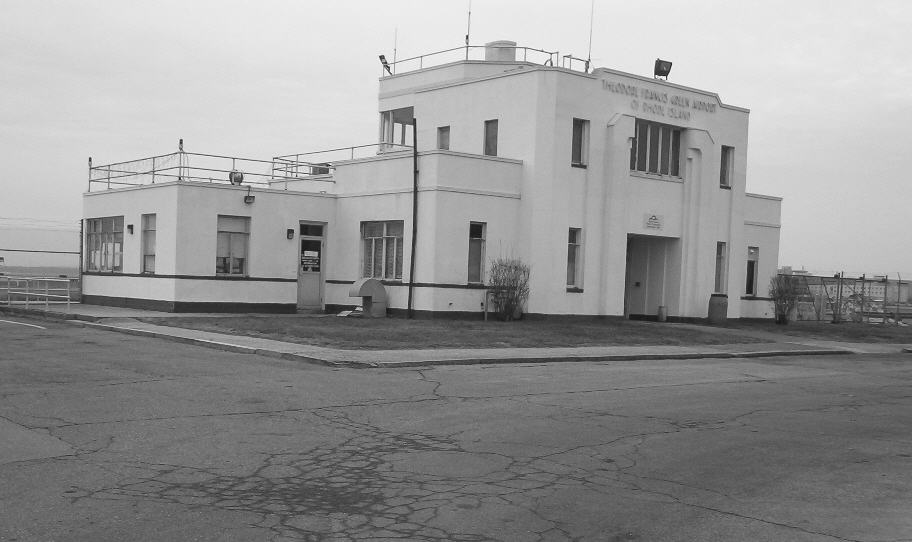

- Location within Rhode Island Location within the United States
- Location: 572 Occupasstuxet Rd. (now Airport Road), Warwick, Rhode Island
- Coordinates: 41°43′54″N 71°25′44″W
- Built: 1932
- Architect: Jackson, Robertson & Adams
- Architectural style: Modern Movement
- MPS: Warwick MRA
- NRHP reference No.: 83000175
- Added to NRHP: August 18, 1983

The Rhode Island State Airport Terminal is a historic airport terminal located on Airport Road in Warwick, Rhode Island, at what is now known as T. F. Green Airport. It was constructed in 1932, and added to the National Register of Historic Places on August 18, 1983.

== History ==
In July 1931, the State of Rhode Island opened Hillsgrove State Airport on 158 acres (0.64 km^{2}) in Warwick, the first state-owned and operated airfield in the United States.

The terminal building opened in January 1933. For many years, it was occupied by an office of the U.S. Weather Service. It currently houses the offices of the Airport Operations Department.

== See also ==
- National Register of Historic Places listings in Kent County, Rhode Island
